= Presidency of Javier Milei =

Argentine presidential administration since 2023

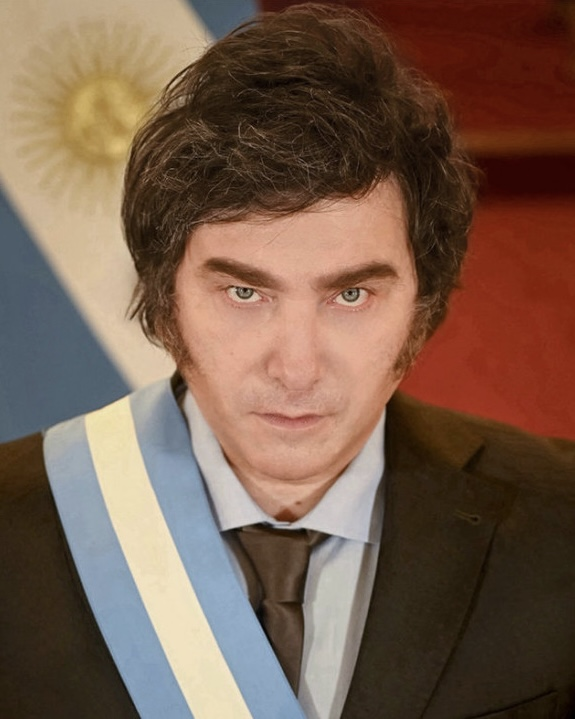
- Presidency of Javier Milei; 10 December 2023 – present
- President: Javier Milei
- Vice President: Victoria Villarruel
- Party: Libertarian Party (until 2024); La Libertad Avanza
- Election: 2023
- Seat: Casa Rosada; Quinta de Olivos
- Standard of the President

Javier Milei's tenure as the 59th president of Argentina began with his inauguration on 10 December 2023. Milei, a member of La Libertad Avanza, took office after defeating then-economy minister Sergio Massa in the 2023 general election. His administration began during deep economic turmoil as part of the ongoing Argentine monetary crisis, with annual inflation surpassing 100% in the months prior to his inauguration.

Described along right-wing populist and right-wing libertarian lines, Milei pursued deregulation policies to alleviate the national economic crisis. He eliminated several government ministries within his first months in office, achieving a budget surplus for the first time since 2011. On foreign affairs, the Milei administration distanced itself from governments such as those of Venezuela and Cuba, which it calls communist, favouring closer ties with Israel amid the Gaza war and Ukraine during the Russo–Ukrainian War.

== 2023 presidential campaign and election ==
On 11 April 2022, Milei announced his candidacy in an interview with Clarín. Milei chose Victoria Villarruel, a National Deputy for the conservative Democratic Party, as his running mate. Villarruel, a veteran's advocate and signer of the Madrid Charter, has been accused of historical revisionism in regards to the Dirty War in the form of Argentine state terrorism denial.

Over the election, Milei steadily rose in the polls for his right-wing libertarian and right-wing populist views, as inflation increased above 100%. During the August 2023 PASO primary, Milei emerged as the leading candidate with 29.86% of the vote. Milei then advanced to the first round where he achieved second place on 22 October against Sergio Massa, the Minister of Economy who represented the incumbent Union for the Homeland coalition, with both advancing to a second round on 19 November.

For the runoff, Milei was endorsed by former president Mauricio Macri and third-place candidate Patricia Bullrich, both members of the Juntos por el Cambio coalition. Milei remained technically tied in polls with Massa but emerged the victor on 19 November by 10 points in a rejection of the establishment Peronists. His victory was likened to that of Donald Trump in the United States and Jair Bolsonaro in Brazil.

== Transition period and inauguration ==
Soon after his victory, Milei began selecting the members of his cabinet. On 21 November 2023, he met with outgoing president Alberto Fernández at the Quinta de Olivos, beginning his presidential transition. On 25 November, he and Vice President-elect Villaruel received a rosary from Pope Francis. At the same time, he had phone calls with Hungarian Prime Minister Viktor Orbán, South Korean president Yoon Suk Yeol, and IMF director Kristalina Georgieva. Later that month, he travelled to the United States (together with members of his prospective cabinet, Nicolás Posse and Luis Caputo), where he visited the tomb of rabbi Menachem Mendel Schneerson and met with former US president Bill Clinton and former senator Chris Dodd. John Kirby, spokesperson for the United States National Security Council, stated that from the White House they "wanted to continue seeking ways to cooperate with Argentina".

On November 29, Javier Milei and Victoria Villarruel were proclaimed president and vice president by the National Congress, while the electoral results of November 19 were formally ratified.

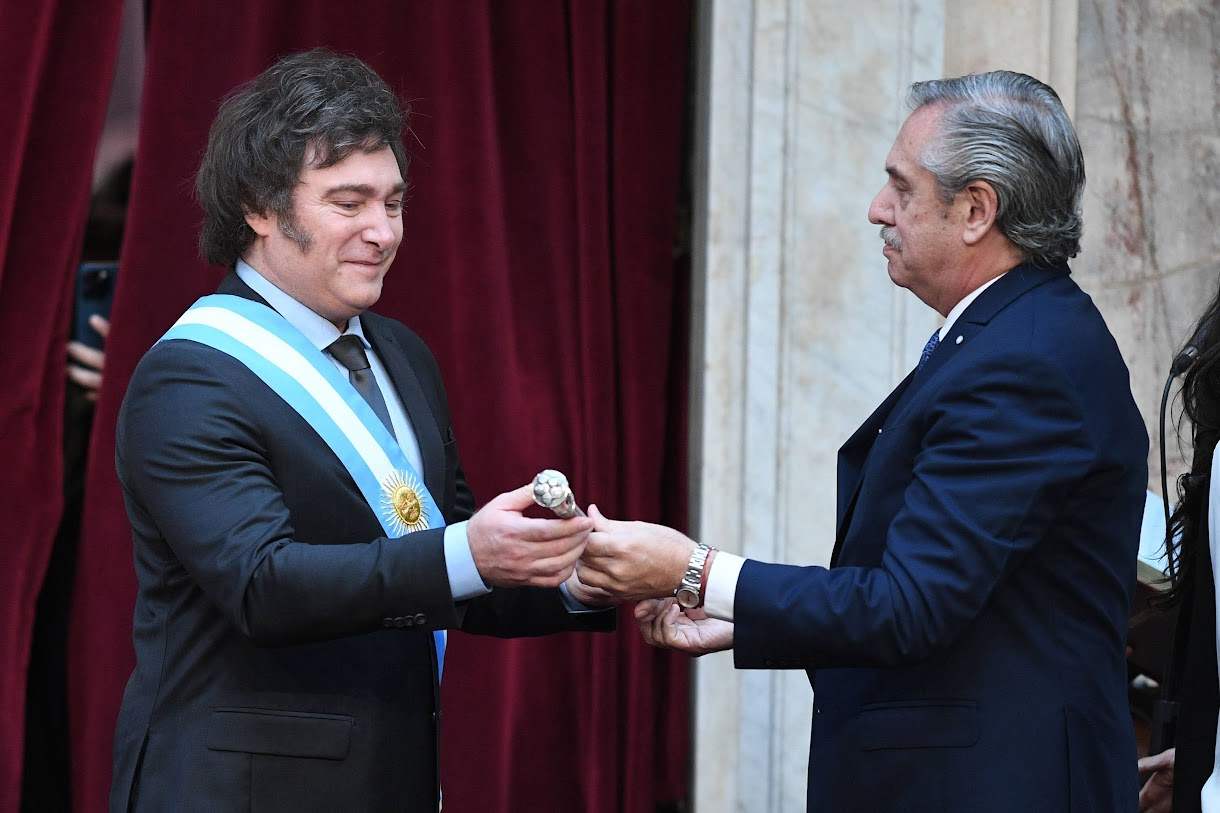
Milei receiving the presidential scepter from outgoing president Alberto Fernández.

Milei was inaugurated on 10 December 2023. He delivered a speech to the Argentine nation, warning of an economic shock, which has been described as shock therapy in economic terms, to be used as a means to fix Argentina's economic woes, with inflation rising to 200 percent. Following the inauguration, Milei saw his popularity increase in public opinion. After the first governmental and economic reforms taken by the president and his ministers, 53% of the Argentine people had a very good or good image of the new head of state according to a popularity poll made by Aresco on 15 December.

La Libertad Avanza sought to become an official party in preparation of the midterm 2025 Argentine legislative election. In October 2025, President Javier Milei's party, La Libertad Avanza], won a landslide victory in midterm elections, making it easier for Milei to push ahead with his programme of radical spending cuts and free-market reforms.

== Cabinet ==
Milei's cabinet took office on 10 December 2023. After the remaining officials from Alberto Fernández's presidency resigned, Milei began his nominations for those responsible for the existing portfolios. His cabinet mostly included ministers from La Libertad Avanza and Juntos por el Cambio.

Upon taking office as president, Milei signed various decrees related to his cabinet members and ministries. He successively named Nicolás Posse as Cabinet Chief, Guillermo Francos as Minister of the Interior, Diana Mondino as Minister of Foreign Affairs, International Trade and Worship, Luis Petri as Minister of Defence, Luis Caputo as Minister of the Economy, Patricia Bullrich as Minister of Security and Mario Russo as Minister of Health. On 10 December, with his 8th decree (the first as president of Argentina), he modified the law and reduced the existing 19 government ministries to nine. President Milei then nominated Mariano Cúneo Libarona as Minister of Justice. As planned in his presidential campaign, he created the ministries of Infrastructure and Human Capital and appointed Guillermo Ferraro and Sandra Pettovello to lead them. In order to name his sister Karina Milei as General Secretariat of the Presidency, he removed the impediment that former president Mauricio Macri signed that would have dictated to designate relatives in the state.

=== Dissolved ministries (dissolved on 10 December 2023) ===
- Ministry of Transport (merged into Ministry of Infrastructure, now part of Ministry of Economy as of 9 February 2024)
- Ministry of Social Development (merged into Ministry of Human Capital)
- Ministry of Education (merged into Ministry of Human Capital)
- Ministry of Public Works (merged into Ministry of Infrastructure, now part of Ministry of Economy as of 9 February 2024)
- Ministry of Women, Genders and Diversity (merged into Ministry of Human Capital)
- Ministry of Culture (merged into Ministry of Human Capital)
- Ministry of Science, Technology and Innovation (merged into Chief of the Cabinet of Ministers)
- Ministry of Labour, Employment and Social Security (merged into Ministry of Human Capital)
- Ministry of the Environment and Sustainable Development (merged into Ministry of Interior)
- Ministry of Tourism and Sports (merged into Ministry of Interior)
- Ministry of Territorial Development and Habitat (merged into Ministry of Infrastructure, now part of Ministry of Economy as of February 9, 2024)

=== Current ministries ===
Portfolio	Minister	Party	Coalition	Start	End
Cabinet Chief	Nicolás Posse	Independent	LLA	10 December 2023	27 May 2024
Cabinet Chief	Guillermo Francos	Independent	LLA	27 May 2024	1 Nov 2025
Cabinet Chief	Manuel Adorni	LLA	LLA	4 Nov 2025	—N/a
Minister of the Interior	Guillermo Francos	Independent	LLA	10 December 2023	27 May 2024
Minister of the Interior	Lisandro Catalán	LLA	LLA	14 Sep 2025	3 Nov 2025
Minister of the Interior	Diego Santilli	PRO	JxC	10 Nov 2025	—N/a
Minister of Foreign Affairs, International; Trade and Worship	Diana Mondino	Independent	LLA	10 December 2023	30 October 2024
Minister of Foreign Affairs, International; Trade and Worship	Gerardo Werthein	Independent	LLA	30 October 2024	27 October 2025
Minister of Foreign Affairs, International; Trade and Worship	Pablo Quirno	LLA	LLA	28 Oct 2025	—N/a
Minister of Deregulation and State Transformation	Federico Sturzenegger	PRO/LLA (Note: Member of La Libertad Avanza since 2024)	JxC/LLA	5 July 2024	—N/a
Minister of Defence	Luis Petri	UCR/LLA (Note: Member of La Libertad Avanza since 2025)	JxC/LLA	10 December 2023	9 December 2025
Minister of Defence	Carlos Presti			10 December 2025	—N/a
Minister of Economy	Luis Caputo	PRO/LLA (Note: Member of La Libertad Avanza since 2024)	JxC/LLA	10 December 2023	—N/a
Minister of Infrastructure	Guillermo Ferraro	Independent	LLA	10 December 2023 (ministry established)	9 February 2024 (ministry dissolved)
Minister of Justice	Mariano Cúneo Libarona	Independent		10 December 2023	—N/a
Minister of Security	Patricia Bullrich	PRO/LLA (Note: Member of La Libertad Avanza since 2025)	JxC/LLA	10 December 2023	2 December 2025
Minister of Security	Alejandra Monteoliva	Independent		2 December 2025	—N/a
Minister of Health	Mario Russo	Independent		10 December 2023	27 September 2024
Minister of Health	Mario Lugones	Independent		27 September 2024	—N/a
Minister of Human Capital	Sandra Pettovello	UCEDE/LLA (Note: Member of La Libertad Avanza since 2024)	LLA	10 December 2023 (ministry established)	—N/a

== Domestic policy ==
=== Overview ===
On 21 December 2023, Milei announced a large decree that became known in the media as "Megadecreto", a plan to modify a wide variety of economic regulations regarding the Argentine economy. In a statement saying that he aims to lay "the foundations for the reconstruction of the Argentine economy and restore freedom and autonomy to individuals, removing the State from their shoulders", more than 300 regulations were set aside, including significant rent and labour market regulations. The decree is subject to approval by Congress, which was called for an extraordinary session to be held in the first months of 2024.

The Milei government said it would not renew contracts for the more than 5000 public sector employees who were hired in 2023, while contracts for other government employees hired prior to 2023 will be reviewed. "The 2023 cutoff is apparently meant to target the practice of outgoing presidents padding the payrolls in their final year". Annual inflation stood at 211% when Milei took office in December 2023, and reached a peak of 289% in April 2024 before falling below 200% for the first time in a year in October 2024. Monthly inflation has come down from 25% in December 2023 to 8.8% in April 2024, more than expected, further dropping to 2.4% by February 2025, the lowest it had been in four years.

In December 2023, Milei announced a repeal of Argentina's rent-control laws, which had been in place to stabilize the rent market but had resulted in a 45% drop in housing supply. Since then, Buenos Aires has experienced a 170% rise in housing availability and a 40% drop in real estate prices. The mortgage market has also seen a surge since deregulation, with the number of mortgages signed nationwide tripling between 2023 and 2024.

On 10 January 2024, the IMF agreed to restart payouts to the Argentine treasury. Trade unions in Argentina have opposed Milei's policies, and the CGT called for a general strike on 24 January 2024. Milei has aimed to build up the central bank's foreign-exchange reserves by raising import and export taxes.

In an interview published on 31 March 2024, Milei emphasised his continued plans to dollarise the economy, but saying that the plans are delayed to after the 2025 Argentine legislative election.

During the first six months of his presidency, poverty rates increased from 41.7% to 52.9%, briefly peaking at 57.4% at the end of January 2024. By the end of 2024 the government estimated that poverty would be near 38.9%, below the 41.4% left by the government of Alberto Fernández. Conversely, the poverty rate in the third quarter was estimated at 49.9% by the Catholic University of Argentina, and 36.8% by the Torcuato Di Tella University. By the second semester of 2024, poverty levels fell sharply to 38%, the lowest since 2022.

After the rejection of various articles of the Bases bill by deputies answering to governors, Milei began to take a series of measures that defunded the provinces in retaliation. In February, he announced the elimination of the Compensatory Fund for Public Transport, through which public transport in the country's interior provinces had been subsidized by transfers from the National State. He also did not continue the National Teacher Incentive Fund (FONID), a fund financed by the Nation since 1998 that provided resources to the provinces to improve teachers' salaries. Among other measures, he requested the resignation of Secretary of Mining Flavia Royon, a person linked to the Governor of Salta, Gustavo Sáenz, and of the director of the ANSES, Osvaldo Giordano, linked to the Governor of Córdoba, Martín Llaryora.

In November 2024, the government created the Regime for the Extinction of Reciprocal Obligations, which seeks to resolve financial conflicts with the provinces through the renegotiation of debts between the National State and the provinces and the total or partial extinguishing of obligations. Just two months after its creation, Catamarca, Tucumán, La Pampa, Chaco, and Chubut had joined the regime.

In 2025, the job market emerged as the biggest concern regarding Milei's economic policies. Between November 2023 and March 2025, private sector jobs fell by 115,000 while state jobs were reduced by 50,000. Jobs in the informal economy, which have lower salaries and fewer benefits, rose by 224,000 between 2024 and 2025. Purchasing power was also negatively affected - between January and April 2025, salaries in the private sector rose by 9.6%, while inflation over that time amounted to 11.6%. Between 2024 and 2025, unemployment increased from 6.4 to 7.9%, becoming the highest unemployment rate in Argentina since 2021.

Milei's economic policies have been criticized for benefiting the wealthiest parts of Argentine society while disadvantaging the poorest. El País wrote: "A privileged minority is reliving the travel and shopping boom of the 1990s thanks to a strong peso and a cheap dollar; the middle and lower classes of society, on the other hand, are increasingly cutting back on spending to make ends meet." A July 2025 report from consulting firm Moiguer argued that the partial economic recovery did not reach everyone and deepened current inequalities, as those in upper income brackets are increasing their consumption while the salaries of middle and lower classes stagnated.

In October 2025, President Javier Milei's party, La Libertad Avanza, won a landslide victory in midterm elections, making it easier for Milei to push ahead with his programme of radical spending cuts and free-market reforms.

=== Economic policy ===
Javier Milei won the Argentine presidential elections of 2023, then he began conducting the most extensive liberalising reforms in since the 1990s. The reforms are still ongoing.

In his first inaugural speech as President of the Nation, on the steps of the Congress, he stated that "No government has received a worse inheritance than the one we are receiving" and that there were "twin deficits totaling 17 points of GDP". He also anticipated that the fiscal adjustment policies would generate a period of "stagflation", a term that combines the words stagnation (economic stagnation) and inflation (rising inflation). He claimed that the drastic cut in public spending and the economic "shock" would cause the situation to worsen in the short term, but lay the foundations for a future recovery and sustainable growth. He claimed "there is no alternative" to the reforms, saying they would negatively affect economic activity, employment, real wages, and poverty and indigence rates, but mostly impact the public sector and not on the private sector. On the other hand, year-on-year accumulated inflation for 2023 was 211.4%, with 25.5% monthly inflation in December 2023, according to data from the INDEC, while reports by La Nación and Clarín reported gross public-sector debt of US$419.291 billion, gross reserves at the BCRA of US$21.168 billion, debt in Liquidity Bills (Leliq) of AR$23 trillion, which generated "an issuance of more than AR$2 trillion a month in interest", monetary issuance equivalent to 20% of GDP, and suppressed utility rates, which "are paid at between 50% and 20% of their real value".

The economic team chosen by the president to implement the government's economic policy was made up mainly of former officials from the Ministry of Finance who had been part of the Mauricio Macri administration. Prominent among them were Luis Caputo as Minister of Economy, Santiago Bausili as president of the Central Bank of Argentina and Pablo Quirno as Secretary of Finance.

==== Early days ====
On 12 December 2023, Economy Minister Luis Caputo announced a package of "Emergency Economic Measures", with the aim of "neutralizing the crisis and stabilizing economic variables". Among them were the suspension of payment of the "official advertising budget" to media outlets for one year (in 2023, 34 billion pesos had been spent), the reduction to the minimum possible of transfers from the national state to the provinces, the suspension of bidding for public works and the cancellation of any projects that had not yet begun at that time (announcing that they would be carried out by the private sector), the reduction of subsidies to energy and transport rates, the liberalization of the dollar exchange rate (from 400 to 800), together with a temporary increase in the PAIS tax on imports and export duties on non-agricultural exports, and the replacement of the SIRA import system with a statistics system that was more flexible and freer. It was also announced that all export duties would subsequently be eliminated, on the grounds that they "hinder development".

The following day, the Central Bank, headed by Santiago Bausili, announced that it would keep the Leliq rate unchanged and that it would seek the possibility of requesting a "waiver" from the IMF, in view of the difficulty of meeting the December maturities. A loan of 913 million dollars was ultimately received from the CAF to pay the maturities. The elimination of SIRA beginning in January 2024 was confirmed, freeing the entry of imports by removing the need for prior authorization from the BCRA. In addition, 300 million dollars were purchased, mainly from agricultural and energy sectors, with the aim of obtaining reserves, thanks to the change in the exchange rate.

Following the measures, on the first day, the gap between the official dollar and the blue dollar fell to 30.4%, compared with a 104% devaluation of the official rate, to 830, and a 4% devaluation of the unofficial rate, to 1,070. After this, the BCRA reported that it would use a crawling peg policy, which consisted of a monthly devaluation of the official dollar value by 2%. Country risk also fell by 3.9% and the value of Argentine debt bonds rose. However, there was an average 37% increase in fuel prices.

On 18 December 2023, the Central Bank decided to "reduce benchmark interest rates in pesos for the market", lowering the passive repo rate to 100% annually, as had already been announced previously, and for time deposits from 133% to 110% annually ("the interest that banks were required to pay on deposits"). This was linked precisely to the goal of eliminating Leliqs, since, in the same statement, the BCRA announced that it had "decided to stop holding auctions to offer these securities". Days later it was confirmed that Leliq debt had been reduced from $20,000 million to $2,200 million within a week, and it was also announced that their formal disappearance was dated for 11 January 2024.

==== State reform ====
With the aim of reducing the fiscal deficit, an austerity policy was proposed centered on reducing the budgets of national public agencies, with the objective of cutting public spending by 5 points of GDP, which represented the national state's budget deficit. Javier Milei's first measure, upon arriving at the presidential office after his inauguration, was signing Decree 8/2023, which reduced the number of ministries from 18 to 9, secretariats from 106 to 54, and undersecretariats from 182 to 140. The next day he decreed a modification to the ban on officials appointing relatives in the national state (so that he could appoint his sister, Karina Milei, as General Secretary), and it was announced that public employees would be required to return to "100% in-person attendance", along with a review of the expenditures and contracts of all remaining ministries made in the previous year, with the aim of "finding irregular contracts". This measure also covered contracts in universities and other agencies of the national state.

On 15 December 2023, a budget cut valued by the government at US$3 billion annually in "operating expenses" was announced, which would include a reduction in the fleet of official cars, the sale of two aircraft belonging to YPF, a reduction of chauffeurs for public officials by 50%, and the elimination of insurance for the paintings at the official residence.

On 20 February 2024, the hierarchical structure of PAMI was reduced, representing "a 24.18% adjustment in hierarchical positions, a 75% cut in Secretariats and the Executive Directorate, a 33% reduction in the number of Managements and nearly 20% fewer Deputy Managements".

===== Reduction of public employment =====
One of the pillars of the austerity policy was the reduction of employees in public agencies, a process that began only two days after the start of his presidency with the announcement that state employment contracts with less than one year of duration would not be renewed and that employees who had entered during 2023 would be dismissed.

By the end of his first year in government, 34,000 workers (approximately 7% of the National State workforce) had been removed from the public sector through various means, generating savings of 3.82 billion dollars.

===== Agencies modified or eliminated =====
- Federal Administration of Public Revenues (AFIP): agency replaced by the creation of the Agencia de Recaudación y Control Aduanero (ARCA), which has an employee structure 34% smaller than that of the previous agency.
- Administración General de Puertos (AGP) and the Undersecretariat of Ports, Navigable Waterways and Merchant Marine: agencies unified following the creation of the Agencia Nacional de Puertos y Navegación (ANPYN).
- Télam: agency replaced by the creation of the State Advertising Agency (APESA). Of the 780 employees it had in December 2023, 352 signed voluntary departure agreements, 233 became part of the news agency of Radio y Televisión Argentina (RTA Noticias), and 200 became part of APESA.
- National Institute Against Discrimination, Xenophobia and Racism (INADI): dissolved through Decree 696/2024.
- National Water and Sanitation Works Entity (ENOHSA): dissolved through Decree 1020/2024.
- Trenes Argentinos Capital Humano (DECAHF): dissolved through Resolution 35/2024.
- National Gas Regulatory Entity (ENARGAS) and National Electricity Regulatory Entity (ENRE): agencies unified following the creation of the National Regulatory Entity for Gas and Electricity (ENRGE).
- National Seed Institute (INASE) and National Seed Commission: dissolved by Decree 462/2025 and functions absorbed by the Secretariat of Agriculture, Livestock, and Fisheries.
- National Institute of Family, Peasant and Indigenous Agriculture (INAFCI): dissolved through Decree 462/2025 and functions absorbed by the Secretariat of Agriculture, Livestock, and Fisheries.
- Regulatory Agency for Hemp and Medicinal Cannabis (ARICCAME): dissolved through Decree 462/2025 and functions absorbed by the National Administration of Drugs, Foods and Medical Devices (ANMAT).
- Institute of Cardiovascular Diseases (INEC): dissolved, it being alleged that it had never functioned despite having been created by law since 2015.
- National Cancer Institute (INC): absorbed by the Ministry of Health.
- National Institute of Tropical Medicine (INMET): integrated into the Malbrán Institute through Decree 458/2025.
- National Belgranian Institute, National Brownian Institute, National Newberian Institute, National Juan Domingo Perón Institute of Historical, Social and Political Studies and Research, and the National Permanent Commission for Tribute to Lieutenant General Juan Domingo Perón: institutes dissolved.
- Housing Construction for the Navy (COVIARA): absorbed by Playas Ferroviarias de Buenos Aires.
- ESMA Memory Site Museum and the National Memory Archive: integrated under the authority of the Centro Internacional para la Promoción de los Derechos Humanos (CIPDH).
- National Institute of Seismic Prevention: merged with the Argentine Geological Mining Service.

More than 200 ministry areas were dissolved by the Ministry of Deregulation and State Transformation.

==== Deregulation of the economy ====
===== Decree of necessity and urgency =====
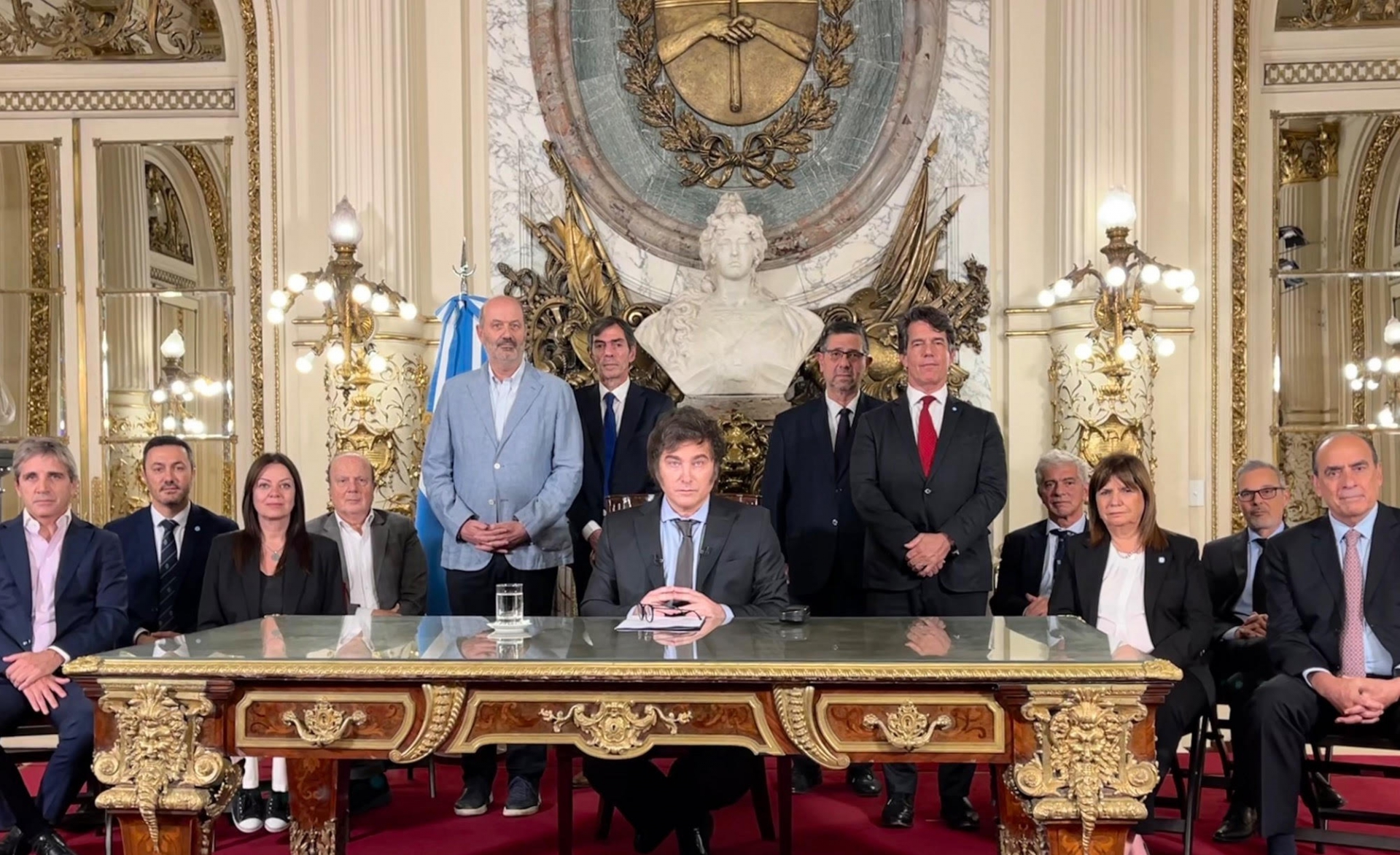
Milei announcing the decree alongside officials on 20 December 2023.

On 20 December 2023, Javier Milei gave a cadena nacional, together with the members of his cabinet and Federico Sturzenegger, in which he set out 30 (of more than 300) measures adopted by decree of necessity and urgency (DNU) 70/2023, entitled "Bases for the Reconstruction of the Argentine Economy". Milei argued that the objective of these measures was to definitively eliminate the fiscal deficit, as well as to fully deregulate the economy, "after decades of failure, impoverishment and anomalies". The DNU was planned and drafted primarily by Federico Sturzenegger, the former president of the Central Bank during the government of Mauricio Macri, as was the legislative package. Among the main measures mentioned were:

- The repeal of: the "Rental Law", the Supply Law, the Shelf Law, the "Buy National Law", the "Industrial Promotion Law", the "Commercial Promotion Law", the "Land Law", the observatory of prices of the Ministry of Economy, the regulations preventing the privatization of public enterprises, and the state company regime.
- The amendment of: the "Fire Management Law", the Civil and Commercial Code, the repeal of Decree No. 743/22 which had established a cap on increases by prepaid medical companies, and the "Companies Law".
- The "transformation of all public enterprises into public limited companies for their subsequent privatization".
- Labour reform: restrictions on the right to strike, extension of the probationary period, elimination of severance pay, restrictions on union financing, and priority of company-level collective agreements over sector-level agreements.
- Reform of the customs code and implementation of the open skies policy.

As soon as the national broadcast ended, protests were recorded in several parts of the country; in several neighborhoods of Buenos Aires there were cacerolazos and a large demonstration outside the National Congress. Experts in constitutional law considered that the decree did not meet the requirements demanded by the National Constitution. A large number of opposition political leaders declared that the DNU was unconstitutional. Civil associations and trade unions filed an amparo so that it would be declared null and void. For his part, the president defended the package of decreed rules, alleging that the DNU had been established in favor of the market, not of businesses, and that it sought to increase the population's well-being. In addition, he added that the people participating in the cacerolazos were "embracing and in love with the model that impoverishes them".

On 30 January 2024, the National Chamber of Labour Appeals declared the unconstitutionality of all of Title IV (labour rules) for being contrary to article 99, paragraph 3, of the National Constitution.

===== Bases Law and Starting Points for the Freedom of Argentines =====
Together with the announcement of the decree, Milei called extraordinary sessions of the National Congress, so that it would deal with a related legislative package between 26 December 2023 and 31 January 2024, calling for the chambers' collaboration in moving forward with, in his own words, "this process of change that society chose, in a context of crisis that requires immediate action". On 27 December, the bill titled "Bases and Starting Points for the Freedom of Argentines" (also called the Bases Law) was introduced; it consisted of an omnibus bill that, according to the government, sought to "restore the economic and social order based on the liberal doctrine embodied in the National Constitution of 1853". Throughout its 664 articles, it contained legislative delegations to the national executive power of public emergency powers in economic, financial, fiscal, social, pension, security, defense, tariff, energy, health and social matters for two years, until December 2025. In economic and fiscal matters, among other measures, it launched a capital amnesty, a tax debt moratorium, a reduction in tax burdens and an increase in export duties.

It also proposed the privatization of state companies and corporations, or those with majority state ownership, including Aerolineas Argentinas; ARSAT; AySA; Bank of the Argentine Nation; Banco de Inversión y Comercio Exterior; Casa de Moneda S.A., Correo Argentino; Enarsa; Ferrocarriles Argentinos; and Operadora Ferroviaria, among others.

On 6 February, despite being approved in general in the Chamber of Deputies, the government decided to send the bill back to committee after many of its articles were rejected in the article-by-article vote. The bill was ultimately taken up again on 30 April and was finally approved on 27 June. However, the approved bill underwent various changes, among which the elimination of the chapter ending the pension moratorium stood out; the industries covered by the Large Investment Incentive Regime (RIGI) were limited to only 5 (forestry industry, infrastructure, mining, energy and technology); and only the privatization of Enarsa, Intercargo, AySA, Belgrano Cargas y Logística, Operadora Ferroviaria and Corredores Viales was authorized, among other things.

==== Exchange-rate policy ====
During the government's first year, the BCRA maintained restrictions on the purchase of dollars and established a crawling peg policy, which consisted of a 2% monthly devaluation of the official dollar value. In January 2025, after a sharp drop in the nominal annual rate, they reduced the pace of the crawling peg to 1%. The following month, there was speculation about a possible new agreement with the IMF, which generated uncertainty that resulted in seven consecutive sessions in which the BCRA suffered reserve losses to contain the exchange-rate gap. On 8 April, the IMF finally agreed to provide financing of 20 billion dollars, and with this, three days later, Caputo and the president of the BCRA announced an end to currency controls with a managed floating exchange-rate regime, also called a "dirty float", with bands between 1,000 and 1,400 pesos per dollar, adjusted monthly by 1%. When the wholesale dollar quotation reached the upper band, the BCRA would sell dollars, and when it reached the lower band it would buy. Despite this, the BCRA could operate in the futures market to influence a drop in the quotation.

In the context of the legislative elections and the unwinding of Fiscal Liquidity Notes (LEFIs), the government tightened its monetary policy through intervention in the futures market and the constant raising of reserve requirements and interest rates with the aim of ensuring that the surplus of pesos would not lead to higher inflation, which contributed to a cooling of economic activity. On 9 September 2025, the government announced that it would intervene through Treasury foreign-currency sales to contain exchange-rate pressure, even if the dollar price did not pass the ceiling of the floating band. Days later, on 18 September, Caputo stated that the Central Bank would "sell up to the last dollar at the top of the band" in order to sustain the managed float policy. Between 17 and 19 September, the monetary authority sold 1.11 billion dollars in reserves, including 678 million in a single day, one of the ten largest daily interventions since 2003, and country risk reached 1,200 points. On 22 September, before markets opened, United States Secretary of the Treasury Scott Bessent published a statement declaring that the Treasury would be willing to do whatever was necessary to support Argentina, through swap lines or through the purchase of foreign currency or dollar-denominated government debt from the Exchange Stabilization Fund. The statement calmed the exchange-rate turbulence, with a fall in the dollar quotation to around 1,366 pesos and a reduction in country risk. Between the announcement and 26 October, the day of the legislative elections, the U.S. Treasury sold more than 2 billion dollars on the foreign-exchange market to defend the top of the band. The pesos obtained through its interventions were invested in local-currency notes issued by the BCRA at an undisclosed rate. On 5 November, the Treasury unwound its investment in notes, activating a 20 billion dollar tranche of the currency swap announced earlier.

==== Social impact ====
The devaluation in December and the set of shock measures included in the economic emergency package caused an increase in poverty of 10% (rising from 44.8% to 54.8%) and in extreme poverty of 6.4% in the first quarter of the year. In numbers, 24.9 million citizens were in poverty and of those, 7.8 million were in extreme poverty. Poverty among retirees grew by more than double, rising from 13.2% in the first half of 2023 to 30.8% in the first half of 2024, so that 1 in 3 retirees was poor and 542,000 of them fell into poverty.

==== Industrial impact ====
In the first quarter of 2024, Argentine industrial production fell to its lowest levels since the COVID-19 pandemic, to 53.4% of capacity. The sectors with the lowest use of installed capacity for production were construction materials (47.2%), plastics and rubber production (44.1%), the textile industry (38.5%), and metalworking (38%).

By July of that year, the Association of National Businesspeople for Argentine Development published a report stating that in the government's first six months, approximately 10,000 SMEs had closed due to the collapse in economic activity following the December devaluation, which caused an increase in inflation and a deterioration in the purchasing power of wages and pensions.

The fall in consumption in his first year in office caused a year-on-year decline in the Monthly Estimator of Economic Activity (EMAE), produced by INDEC. For the first 10 months in office, the contraction in economic activity was 2.7%. The sectors most affected were construction and manufacturing industry. One of the sectors that most mitigated the year-on-year decline in activity in the index was agriculture, which had gone through a drought in 2023 and reached increases of 98.4% in May and 80.1% in June.

According to an analysis by Misión Productiva, based on a report by the United Nations, Argentina had a 9.4% decline in industrial activity during 2024. The collapse in industrial activity had its counterpart in employment (-2.2% compared with the previous year).

At the beginning of 2025, economic activity showed a year-on-year improvement of 6.5% in January, 5.7% in February and 5.6% in March. Sectoral performance for March recorded a recovery compared with 2024, a year in which activity suffered a particularly low level following the initial effects of the government's adjustment policies. The standout sectors with growth were financial intermediation (29.3%), construction (9.9%), trade (9.3%), mining (5.7%) and industry (4.2%). Meanwhile, the hotel and restaurant sector and electricity, gas and water continued to decline (-4.3 and -3.6, respectively).

==== Loss of businesses ====
Between November 2023 and November 2025, a total of 21,938 companies were lost (a 4.3% drop in the total number of companies), marking the worst decline in the first 24 months of a government since the late 1990s. The most affected sectors were transport and storage services (down 13.3%), real estate (-10.4%), construction (-8%), professional and scientific services (-7.4%), and industry (-4.9%).

In the same period, 290,600 thousand jobs were lost (a drop of 3%).

=== Infrastructure policy ===
At the beginning of Javier Milei's administration, the infrastructure area had ministerial rank, with the creation of the Ministry of Infrastructure, headed by Guillermo Ferraro. On 26 February 2024, following Ferraro's resignation, the recently created ministry was abolished and its functions were transferred to the sphere of the Ministry of Economy. From the beginning of the Milei administration, the package of economic emergency measures announced the end of public works bidding by the national government. This, combined with the policy of reducing state employees, caused the suspension of works that had been underway until then and disinvestment in certain state-dependent sectors. One example of this is the drop in investment in the railway network by 98% and a 41% cut in operating expenses, a 100% reduction in road corridors and a 55.9% reduction in Enarsa. Regarding public works, in May 2024 the president of the Argentine Chamber of Construction (CAMARCO) estimated that between 3,500 and 4,000 public works projects were halted and that more than one hundred thousand jobs had been lost. Faced with this situation, some governors signed over certain public works projects, which until then had been under the national government's responsibility, so they could continue them with their own funds.

For 2025, the government created the Federal Concessions Network, a concession system for the operation and maintenance of stretches of road in the Federal Road Network, with the aim that the state-owned company Corredores Viales would cease operating them. On 15 January of that year, the first stage of the bidding process began, involving Road Corridor 18, which includes National Routes 12 and 14 and the Rosario-Victoria Bridge.

=== Energy policy ===
The energy area during the administration was under the Ministry of Economy. The first Secretary of Energy was Eduardo Chirillo, who remained in office until 17 October 2024, when he resigned for health reasons and was replaced by PRO economist María Tettamanti.

On 29 May 2024, during the autumn season, gas supply to certain industries and thermoelectric plants was suspended due to the delay in the purchase of this resource, worth five hundred million dollars, from the Brazilian company Petrobras. This purchase had been made as an emergency measure, due to increased demand and the inability of energy infrastructure to meet it in time. The government excused itself by stressing that it was a year with atypical temperatures and that demand had increased by nearly 55% year-on-year. The opposition accused the government of being responsible for this shortage because it had halted construction of the first stage of the Perito Francisco Pascasio Moreno Gas Pipeline (formerly known as the Néstor Kirchner Gas Pipeline), which consists of the construction of two compressor plants in Tratayén and Salliqueló and which would have supplied the country with the necessary infrastructure to avoid problems with gas supply. According to former Secretary of Energy Flavia Royon, the work in Tratayén was, as of December 2023, 82% complete and should have continued. The government's version is that the work was not halted and that when they took office they received the Salliqueló works 19% complete and three months behind schedule, and Tratayén 39% complete and five months behind schedule, and that they had inherited a debt from the previous government with the construction companies. Coinciding with this event, the government began implementing a new tariff regime to gradually reduce subsidies on gas and electricity. In June of that same year, construction of the first compressor plant of the gas pipeline in Tratayén was completed. In December 2024, the president of the Council of Advisors of the President, Demian Reidel, announced the implementation of an Argentine Nuclear Plan, consisting of the creation of an Argentine Nuclear Council that would carry out the arrangements for the construction, as a first stage, of a small modular reactor (SMR) at the Atucha Nuclear Complex and the development, as a second stage, of uranium reserves to cover domestic demand and export high value-added fuels.

During Javier Milei's administration, an accelerated cut in energy subsidies was carried out as part of a broader fiscal adjustment program. During 2024, the Government reduced energy subsidies by approximately US$2.7 billion in the first seven months and the adjustment continued in 2025. The strategy was associated with the declaration of emergency in the energy sector and the decision to move toward a scheme in which tariffs cover the real cost of the service, in line with fiscal goals and the macroeconomic commitments discussed with the IMF.

The cut had a strong impact on the tariffs paid by users. Significant increases in electricity and gas bills were documented, especially for middle-income users, who began to bear almost the full cost of the service. Reports in the press indicated that, in the Greater Buenos Aires area, tariffs registered cumulative increases of several hundred percentage points since the end of 2023.

=== Transport policy ===
==== Railways ====
On 13 June 2024, a 24-month public railway emergency was declared, assigning an additional budget of 1.3 trillion pesos for maintenance works and the purchase of rolling stock.

In December of that year, the government dissolved Trenes Argentinos Capital Humano (DECAHF), which had a budget for that year of 42 billion pesos, and dismissed its 1,388 employees. Through the Ley Bases, the government was authorized to privatize Trenes Argentinos Operaciones and Trenes Argentinos Cargas. In October 2024, the intention to privatize Trenes Argentinos Cargas was announced, and in November the process was announced to tender, in the first quarter of 2025, the 7 railway lines so that they would be operated by private companies, including those already operated by private entities such as the Urquiza Line (Metrovías) and the Belgrano Norte Line (Ferrovías).

==== Air transport ====
In July 2024, the government regulated the articles relating to the Aeronautical Code of DNU 70/2023, establishing an open skies policy, which eliminated the exclusivity of Aerolíneas Argentinas and eased the entry of foreign airlines. By the end of 2024, the country had already signed bilateral agreements to adopt the open skies policy with 11 countries.

In November of that year, the deregulation of ramp services at airports was announced, ending the monopoly of the state-owned company Intercargo, which is on the list of companies authorized to be privatized under the Ley Bases.

==== Bus transport ====
In February 2024, the government eliminated the Interior Compensation Fund, which, through transfers from the National State, subsidized public transport in provinces in the interior of the country. This fund, in 2023, had contributed about 102 000 million pesos in subsidies.

Following the policy of reducing subsidies, the annual variation in State spending on transport subsidies between 2023 and 2024 was -20.9%. The minimum bus fare rose from 76.92 pesos in January to 371.13 pesos in December. By December 2025 it was 494.83.

In September 2024, the national government transferred to the Government of the City of Buenos Aires the control and administration of the bus lines operating within CABA, also granting it the authority to set fares.

==== Road infrastructure ====
At the beginning of the term, the government drastically reduced investment in public road works, cutting allocations intended for maintenance and the execution of inherited projects and halting much of the work that was underway when it took office; capital resources linked to road infrastructure went from representing a relevant percentage of spending to falling by nearly 75% in real terms.

In 2025, the government ordered the dissolution of the National Highway Directorate, generating uncertainty about the continuity of the road network covering more than 40,000 kilometers, arguing that this measure would combat inefficient practices and reduce the State. However, the National Congress rejected several executive decrees that included the dissolution of the agency, leading the government to revoke the proposed modifications and restore the validity of National Highways.

=== Electoral policy ===
The designated Chief of the Cabinet was Guillermo Francos, who proposed the implementation of an electoral reform, which would include the elimination of the open, simultaneous, and compulsory primaries (PASO) and the implementation of a single ballot system, either paper or electronic, which had already been approved by the Chamber of Deputies since 2022.

On 1 October 2024, with the support of the UCR and the PRO, the law modifying the National Electoral Code was enacted, introducing the Single Paper Ballot (BUP) as the voting instrument in national elections.

In January 2025, the government called extraordinary sessions and placed among the bills to be discussed the Clean Record bill, which consists of an amendment to the Organic Law of Political Parties and the Law on Democratization of Political Representation, making people convicted on appeal for crimes linked to public administration ineligible to hold public office.

=== Defense policy ===
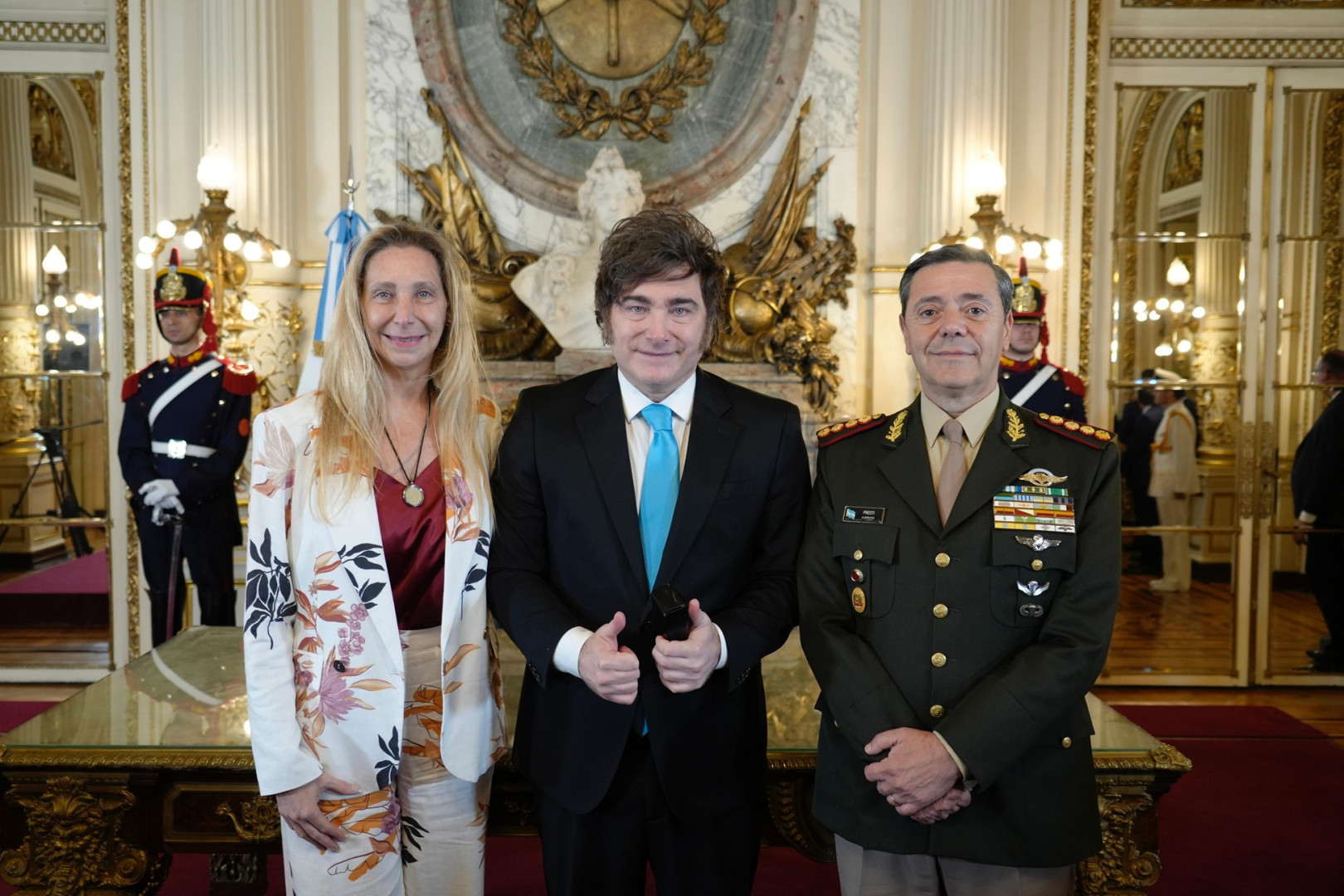
Karina and Javier Milei together with Defense Minister Carlos Presti, December 2025

At the beginning of the administration, former vice-presidential candidate Luis Petri took office at the Ministry of Defense. In a meeting with the Joint Chiefs of Staff, he announced that he would emphasize restoring the value of the Armed Forces, as well as "guaranteeing the territorial integrity of national sovereignty". The Joint Chiefs of Staff of the Armed Forces was one of the few areas that did not experience the effects of the "chainsaw" on its spending, with an 18.6% increase in its budget.

On December 16, Petri announced a ban on the use of "inclusive language" in the Armed Forces. The following day, in the context of the storms in Buenos Aires Province, which left 13 dead, he made the Armed Forces available to assist victims and control damage.

In January 2024, Xavier Julián Isaac of the Air Force was appointed chief of the Joint Chiefs of Staff of the Armed Forces, with the rank of brigadier general. Meanwhile, in the Army, Carlos Alberto Presti was appointed with the rank of general of division; in the Navy, Carlos María Allievi with the rank of vice admiral; and in the Air Force, Fernando Luis Mengo with the rank of brigadier general. He also forced 22 generals into retirement, while others became part of the Ministry of Defense. With these removals and appointments, commanders who had ties to the previous government were left out of the Army's leadership structure. On November 21 of that year, Petri decided to dismiss Fernando Luis Mengo for "improper use of aircraft" of the armed force. Thus, on December 4, 2024, he installed Brigadier Gustavo Javier Valverde as Chief of the General Staff of the Air Force (JEMGFA).

For the October 2025 legislative elections, Petri ran as a candidate for deputy of the Nation and was elected with 53.63% of the vote. To succeed him, the government appointed the then Chief of the General Staff of the Army, Lieutenant General Carlos Alberto Presti. The last military officer to hold that office had been rear admiral Norberto Couto, appointed during the de facto administration of Roberto Eduardo Viola in 1981. Following his appointment, Presti changed the entire top military command, appointing Marcelo Dalle Nogare as chief of the Joint Chiefs of Staff of the Armed Forces, with the rank of vice admiral; in the Army, Oscar Zarich with the rank of general of division; in the Navy, Juan Carlos Romay with the rank of vice admiral; and in the Air Force, Gustavo Valverde with the rank of brigadier major.

Although the tradition in Argentina's foreign policy had been the "principle of non-intervention", in June 2024 Argentina joined the Rammstein Contact Group, a group of countries working to coordinate logistical and military support for Ukraine following the Russian invasion of Ukraine.

During 2025, a sharp increase in voluntary departures from the Armed Forces was recorded. According to a report from the Chief of the Cabinet of Ministers presented in September of that year, since December 2023 more than 18,000 personnel had requested separation, consisting of 840 officers, 2,398 non-commissioned officers, and 15,421 volunteer soldiers. While the Defense Ministry maintained that the situation was not unprecedented and would be offset by new intakes and salary improvements, various media outlets stated that the departures were associated with factors such as low salaries, lack of equipment, deficiencies in military health care, and professional demotivation.

==== Acquisitions ====
In April 2024, a purchase agreement was signed with Denmark for the acquisition of twenty-four Lockheed Martin F-16 Fighting Falcon Block 15 MLU multirole fighters (sixteen single-seats and eight two-seaters), from the Royal Danish Air Force. With this acquisition, Argentina regained the supersonic interception capability lost in 2015 with the retirement of the Mirage IIIEA and M-V Dagger. That same month, the United States announced the awarding of Foreign Military Financing (FMF) worth forty million dollars to the country, with the aim of supporting the defense modernization process. Argentina had not received this funding since 2003.

In July 2024, the government spent $10 million to reactivate a purchase agreement with Norway for 4 Lockheed P-3 Orion aircraft (3 P-3C and one P-3N), for a total amount of $67 million. The operation was supposed to be finalized during Alberto Fernández's administration; however, it had remained inactive because payment deadlines had not been met. The first P-3 arrived in September of the same year. In December, the Argentine Army received 10 TAM tanks, modernized to the 2C-A2 version.

In July 2025, in Washington, Minister Luis Petri signed an agreement for the purchase of an unspecified number of Stryker armoured personnel carriers, some of them surplus from the United States Army, although most will be newly manufactured. A total of 156 armored vehicles is expected to be acquired. In August, the Argentine Air Force received an Embraer E-140 medium transport aircraft, strengthening its transport capabilities.

At the end of 2025, the Chief of the Army, Lieutenant General Carlos Alberto Presti, was appointed Minister of Defense effective December 10, 2025, replacing Petri, who would leave office to assume a seat in the Chamber of Deputies. The appointment marked a historic event in democratic Argentina, as he is the first active-duty military officer to occupy that post since the return of democracy in 1983.

=== Security policy ===
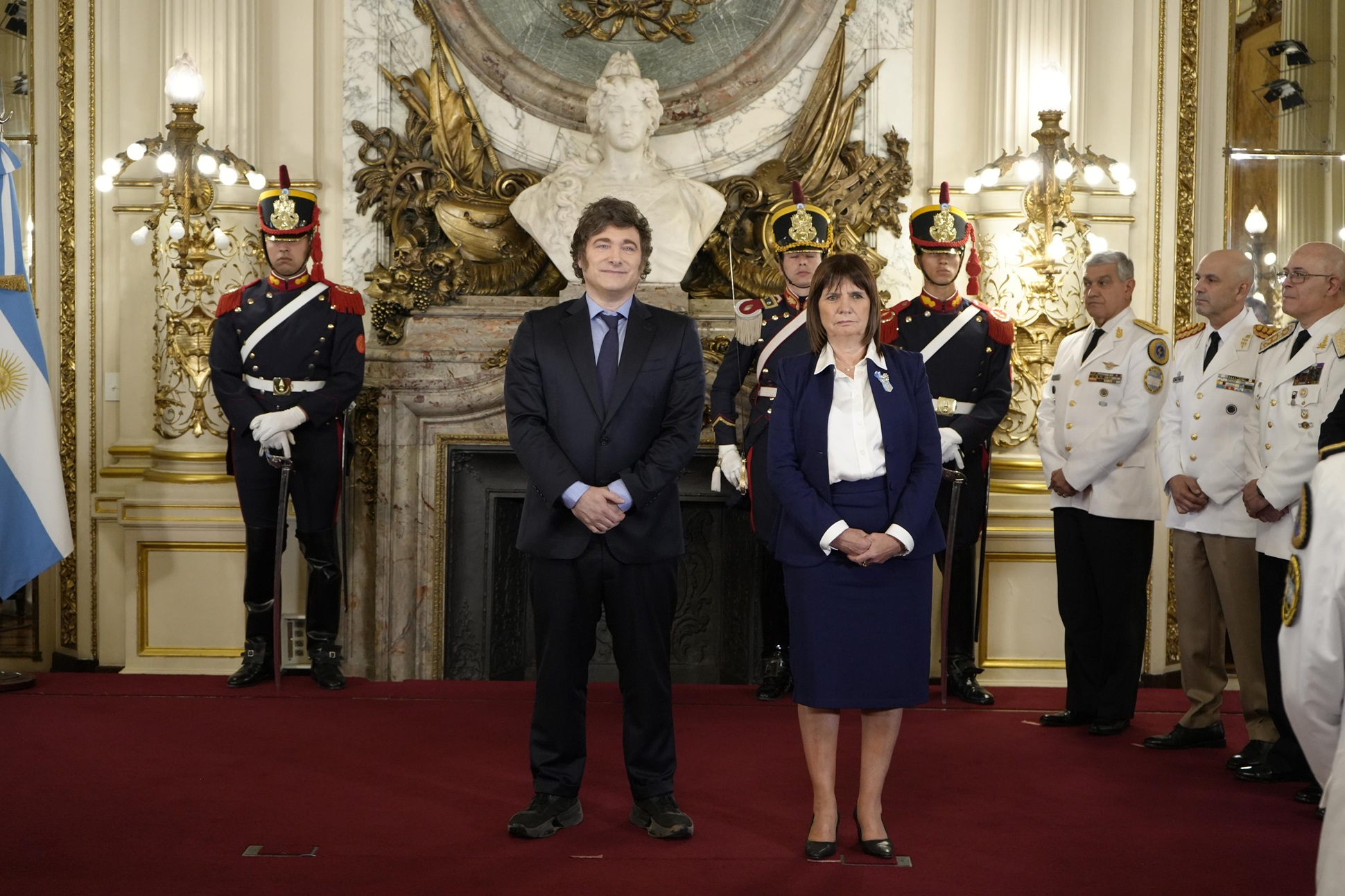
Milei with Minister of Security Patricia Bullrich

The appointed Minister of Security was Patricia Bullrich, who had already held the same office during the presidency of Mauricio Macri. Throughout the campaign, emphasis was placed on fighting crime, using the slogan "Those who do it will pay for it", and criticizing what he calls the "Zaffaroni doctrine". He proposed a reform of the law on internal security, national defense and intelligence, and a modification of the "prison system and the criminal procedure penal code". The security area was one of the few areas that did not experience a severe cut in spending in the face of the "chainsaw" policy in public spending.

On December 1, 2025, Minister Bullrich sent a letter to President Milei announcing her decision to formally resign from the post in order to take office as a national senator. In this context, on December 2, 2025, the appointment of Alejandra Monteoliva, who was then serving as Secretary of National Security, as the new minister was made official.

On December 10, 2024, the regulations for the acquisition and possession of firearms were modified, lowering the minimum age for obtaining the lawful-user credential from 21 to 18 years.

In 2024, the country's crime statistics fell to 3.8 cases per 100,000 inhabitants, the second-lowest rate in Latin America and an improvement over 2023, when it was 4.4 cases. In the Global Peace Index, the country maintained its position in the ranking, placing 47th.

==== Public Order Protocol ====
The issue of piquetes was a recurring topic during the election campaign. Milei always stated that he would guarantee citizens' right to free movement, impaired by street blockades, particularly in the City of Buenos Aires. In his inaugural speech, Milei stated that "Those who block will not get paid", implying that anyone participating in a piquete would be denied any form of state welfare.

On December 14, Minister Bullrich, at a press conference, presented the new nationwide "Public Order Protocol". Among the main points were:

- "The four federal forces plus the federal penitentiary service will intervene in the face of roadblocks, piquetes and blockades." "They may intervene in accordance with the current procedural codes. If there is a in flagrante delicto, they will be able to intervene." "They will use the minimum necessary and sufficient force. It will be graduated according to the resistance."
- "Action will be taken until the circulation space has been cleared."
- "The perpetrators, accomplices and instigators of this offense will be identified. So too will the vehicles and their drivers." "The data of the perpetrators, accomplices, participants, instigators and organizers will be sent to the corresponding enforcement authorities." "A registry will be created of the organizations that participate in this type of act."
- "We will work in train stations when we detect people in possession of material that should be seized."
- "In the case of foreigners with temporary residence, the information will be sent to the National Directorate for Migration."
- "A competent judge will be notified in the event of environmental damage during demonstrations."
- "In the case of the participation of children and adolescents, the competent child-protection authority will be notified and sanctions will be imposed."
- "For all costs associated with security operations, the bill will be sent to the responsible organizations or individuals."

==== Intelligence Secretariat ====
On December 13, through Decree 24/2023, Javier Milei intervened in the Federal Intelligence Agency (AFI), appointing Silvestre Sívori as its intervener. The intervention is expected to last two years, "during which staff reductions and other measures in the use of resources will be advanced". At the beginning of January 2024, in the context of an audit of contracts and spending, hundreds of employees of the agency connected to the previous administration were dismissed. At the same time, five retired military officers were appointed, incorporating sectors of military intelligence, although by law they cannot conduct domestic intelligence, only intelligence on external threats.

On July 23, 2024, the government made official the dissolution of the Federal Intelligence Agency and the return of the Secretariat of Intelligence (SIDE), to which it assigned 100 billion pesos and established that the funds would be "classified". Sergio Neiffert was appointed head of the secretariat without going through Congress, and SIDE was constituted as a presidential secretariat. The new modifications carried out in the Intelligence Law made it possible to conduct counterintelligence on any person or organization because of their "political opinion, or adherence or membership in party, social, or trade union organizations". On August 21 of that year, the opposition rejected the government decree assigning 100 billion pesos in classified funds to SIDE, with 156 votes in favor, 52 against, and 6 abstentions.

In September 2025, the bicameral committee of the National Congress rejected the National Intelligence Plan for the first time in its history, considering that it enabled SIDE to carry out illegal intelligence work against politicians, social organizations, and journalists.

==== Plan Bandera ====
The case of Rosario was a focal point of Javier Milei's electoral campaign, because violence caused by organized crime had made the city in Santa Fe the most unsafe in the country and the one with the highest homicide rate, particularly linked to criminal organizations dedicated to trafficking illegal drugs. In 2022, already under the mayoralty of Pablo Javkin, 288 homicides were recorded, the highest figure recorded up to that time, surpassing the previous record of 271 homicides in 2013. By 2022 more than 70% of intentional homicides in this city of Santa Fe were associated with criminal organizations, and nearly 75% were planned rather than spontaneous. In 2018, there was an intensification of violence linked to the crossfire of drug trafficking, mainly due to the presence of a criminal organization called "Los Monos", which has been involved in this business since the 1990s. The first warning signs appeared at the end of 2017, when the city experienced a resurgence of violence.

On December 18, 2023, the Minister of Security of the Nation, Patricia Bullrich, together with the Governor of Santa Fe, Maximiliano Pullaro, and the mayor of Rosario, Pablo Javkin, announced the "Plan Bandera" in an event held at the National Flag Memorial, intended to "strengthen security in Santa Fe Province".

At the beginning of March 2024, in a context of threats against authorities and murders of civilians, the Executive Branch formed an Operational Board together with local and provincial authorities. At the same time, the intervention of the city by the Federal Security Forces was announced, as well as the intention to deploy the Armed Forces to combat illicit organizations. According to the Government, this was aimed at coordinating both forces and ministries in the fight against drug trafficking, by providing greater equipment capacity, radar coverage, helicopters, drones, aircraft, etc. However, only the Gendarmerie, the Federal Police, the Prefecture, and the Airport Security Police were included in the resolution as part of the reinforcement. The transfer of military personnel to reinforce the entire northern border was also announced.

By August of that year, homicides in Rosario had been reduced by nearly 60%, while in areas and neighborhoods with a presence of the Federal Forces the drop reached 72%

==== Modification of the Juvenile Penal Regime ====
On June 28, 2024, during a press conference, Bullrich and the Minister of Justice, Mariano Cúneo Libarona, publicly presented a bill, jointly drafted by both ministries, which seeks to establish a new Juvenile Penal Regime by lowering the age of criminal responsibility to 13. Under Milei's slogan "adult crime, adult punishment", the new penal system for young people proposes, among other points, that adolescents between 13 and 18 years old be charged for an act defined as a crime in the Penal Code, being housed in special establishments separate from penitentiaries under the care of qualified personnel, where they will be subject to adaptation and social reintegration processes. Currently, the legislation in force sets the minimum age of criminal responsibility at 16, with those under 16 exempt from criminal responsibility. However, the Government considers that this regime established in 1980 must be updated.

==== Decree on concealment and laundering of assets of criminal origin ====
On June 5, Decree 496 was published, including a modification to RePET (the Public Registry of Persons and Entities Linked to Acts of Terrorism and its Financing, created in 2019 by Decree 489) that established a very broad margin for defining who can be incorporated into it. It established that "any natural person, legal person or entity regarding whom the Ministry of Security and the Ministry of Foreign Affairs, International Trade and Worship, within the framework of their functions, investigations or reports, had reasonable grounds to suspect is linked to a real or potential external threat to national security" could be added. This drew the attention of the Permanent Assembly for Human Rights for creating "a combination of legal instruments characteristic of an authoritarian state".

==== RNDG ====
On August 15, 2024, the Chamber of Deputies of the Nation approved, although with modifications, the preliminary passage of the bill establishing the expansion of the Registry of Genetic Data linked to Crimes against Sexual Integrity (RNDG) to investigate all types of crimes, proposed and promoted by Minister of Security Patricia Bullrich. The approval was celebrated in the chamber by the organization "Madres del Dolor", victims of femicide.

==== Reform of the Argentine Federal Police (PFA) ====
On June 17, 2025, Javier Milei together with Patricia Bullrich announced the structural reform of the Argentine Federal Police through Decree 383/2025, which led to the creation of the Departamento Federal de Investigaciones, a unit within the PFA specialized in intelligence and criminal investigation tasks.

=== Social policy ===
Sandra Pettovello was designated by Javier Milei to lead the Ministry of Human Capital, which encompasses the jurisdictions previously covered by the Ministry of Education, the Ministry of Social Development, and the Ministry of Labour, Employment and Social Security. During the election campaign, Milei announced that this ministry was the only one that "had an open wallet", since he understood that the economic reforms were going to harm social well-being in the short term, and that "social containment" would have to be provided especially to the lower classes. It is estimated that by the time of Javier Milei's inauguration, poverty stood at 44.7% and indigence at 9.6%, and in the case of children and adolescents it stood at 62%.

During the broadcast of the "Emergency Economic Measures" by Luis Caputo on December 12, the doubling of the budget of the Universal Child Allowance (AUH) and a 50% increase in the budget of the "tarjeta Alimentar" were also announced, with the aim of ensuring the social well-being of the lower classes during the economic reforms. The continuation of the "Potenciar Trabajo" bonus was also announced, but guaranteeing that it would be provided without intermediaries, as also with the AUH and the tarjeta Alimentar. (Note: Luis Caputo anunció las medidas económicas: dólar oficial a 800 pesos, liberan las importaciones y reducen subsidios a tarifas y transporte)

On December 26, 2023, "the audit of all Potenciar Trabajo social plans, which are well over a million, to detect irregularities" was announced, as well as the claim that "160,000 Potenciar Trabajo holders were receiving the benefit illegitimately". It was also confirmed that about 8,500 Potenciar Trabajo plans being received by public employees would be terminated.

On May 13, 2024, the Ministry of Human Capital filed a complaint for "breach of the duties of a public official" and "fraud against the Public Administration" because, according to an internal audit, approximately half of the soup kitchens and snack centers registered in the National Registry of Soup Kitchens (RENACOM) did not exist (either because they never existed or because they had stopped operating years earlier), and funds would have been transferred from the National State to bank accounts that did not belong either to soup kitchens or social centers. One particular case was verified of an allegedly nonexistent soup kitchen that "operated" in a gated community (country). However, it also became known that one of the soup kitchens denounced as nonexistent was operating Monday through Friday and had even received the audit officials.

==== Case over the refusal to distribute food ====
The Government did not distribute food packages from the inauguration on December 10, 2023. This fact, which had been denounced since February 2024 by political activist Juan Grabois, led to the Church, which had already protested in February, accusing the government on May 27 of holding back 5 million kilograms of food that were not being distributed among those most in need in the midst of a food emergency. In addition, Sandra Pettovello, responsible for food distribution as minister, was reported over the matter.

Faced with this situation, presidential spokesman Manuel Adorni acknowledged the existence of that quantity of food and clarified that "the food is going to be distributed and will reach the people it has to reach", and Patricia Bullrich excused herself by stating that "nothing is being kept, quite the opposite, what is being done is preventing food from being stolen". However, Pablo de la Torre, Secretary for Children and Family, stated that those foods were stored for use in a possible emergency and that, according to him, they were a reserve inventory.

Finally, on May 27, a court ruling required the Government to distribute the food through community soup kitchens within 72 hours, and the Government promised to explain the reasons why the food was not being distributed. The Government appealed this judicial decision, although it acknowledged that there were products close to expiring and assured that it would deliver them immediately with the Army. In turn, official Pablo de la Torre was dismissed for "poor performance".

The Organization of Ibero-American States, which in December signed an agreement with the Government "for the provision of temporary personnel services and the acquisition of food intended to improve the nutritional quality of vulnerable families", distanced itself from the Government's actions through a statement. The OEI thus stated that they carried "out the hiring of providers for various functions requested by that office", but that "the selection of profiles corresponds exclusively to the Secretariat and that they limit themselves to carrying out the decisions and procedures established by it".

In the face of the Government's passivity in distributing the food, different judges from different provinces, among them Sebastián Casanello, issued "orders to produce with search in default" to be carried out by the Gendarmerie in different warehouses during June 1.

On June 6, the food still had not been distributed, so a judge again ordered that it be distributed in less than 24 hours. Even so, on June 18 they had still not been distributed, and the judge again found the Government's plan insufficient and ordered it to distribute the food within 72 hours. On June 25, Pettovello again failed to comply with Casanello's judicial order, using as an excuse that it was the previous government's fault and that each province should distribute the goods (5,825,946 kilograms of food as of June 19).

Pettovello failed in her appeal when the Federal Chamber of Criminal Cassation confirmed the order to present a plan for the distribution of food intended for social soup kitchens. The ruling, handed down by 3 judges, underscored the Government's lack of forceful argumentation. On July 25, 2024, the Federal Administrative Litigation Court decided to dismiss the motion for reconsideration and the subsidiary appeal presented by the government against the measure obliging it to detail the plan for delivering food to social soup kitchens and gave it until Monday the 29th. On August 15, 2024, the Federal Chamber of Criminal Cassation rejected the extraordinary appeal filed by Sandra Pettovello and Rodolfo Barra by which they were attempting to take the case to the Supreme Court of Argentina, thus exhausting the possible avenues of judicial appeal for the Ministry of Human Capital, which would be obliged to deliver the food that had remained stored and undistributed.

==== Gender and diversity policy ====
After assuming the presidency of the Nation, Javier Milei by presidential decree eliminated the Ministry of Women, Genders and Diversity created by former president Alberto Fernández. The functions of the dissolved ministry were assigned to the Undersecretariat for Protection against Gender Violence, which was initially placed within the Ministry of Human Capital and was transferred on May 24, 2024, to the Ministry of Justice. Finally, on June 6, 2024, the undersecretariat was definitively closed.

Javier Milei's government cut the appropriations of the former ministry by 33 percent together with the Plan Nacional de Prevención del Embarazo No Intencional en la Adolescencia created during the administration of former president Mauricio Macri and continued by Alberto Fernández. In turn, by presidential decree, the use of inclusive language and everything related to the gender perspective in documents of the national public administration was prohibited.

The Latin American Team for Justice and Gender carried out monitoring of the implementation and budget execution of all policies intended to prevent and address gender violence issues, and those aimed at reducing gender inequality in the first semester. It showed a major year-on-year budgetary setback. ELA reported that 19 public policies against violence were being dismantled. The Undersecretariat that until a few weeks earlier had addressed gender issues suffered an 80% reduction in real budget execution compared with the first semester of 2023, and the year-on-year budget execution of line 144 was reduced by 38% in the first semester of the year.

In December 2024, the government announced that the murders of women for that year were reduced by more than 10%. This is corroborated by data published by Casa del Encuentro showing that there was an 11% reduction in 2024 compared with 2023. From January 1 to October 31, 2023, there were 275 victims and in 2024, for that same period, this was reduced to 243 victims. This was also confirmed by the report of the Lucía Pérez Observatory, which indicated an 11% reduction, from 324 femicides in 2023 to 291 in 2024.

For the femicides of 2025, the Lucía Pérez Observatory reported that there were 271 femicides.

==== Policy toward indigenous peoples ====
On December 28, 2023, organizations of indigenous peoples decided to lift the encampment they had maintained in Plaza de Mayo after being received by Patricia Bullrich and Waldo Wolff. This encampment had been maintained since February 2020, for four years, because they had never managed to be received by President Alberto Fernández, in protest over recognition of their ancestral territories, the Indigenous Community Land Ownership law, and a Plurinational and Plurilingual State.

In May 2024, 35 indigenous organizations of Argentina submitted a document to the UN Permanent Forum on Indigenous Issues denouncing the situation indigenous peoples were experiencing, how the existence of indigenous communities was being threatened, and how Milei's policies "deepen the process". At the same time, they expressed opposition to the proposal to repeal Law 26,160, which declared the indigenous territorial emergency and suspended the enforcement of evictions from lands occupied by indigenous peoples. On December 10, by means of Decree 1083/2024, the government repealed Law No. 26,160 and Decree No. 805 of November 17, 2021, which had extended the emergency in "indigenous lands"; in this way, it allowed the acceleration of eviction operations over territories that are disputed and in conflict with organizations representing indigenous peoples. In January 2025, the government carried out the first eviction after the repeal of the law, expelling the groups that had been occupying since 2020 the El Maitenal section in Los Alerces National Park, whom the government described as false Mapuches.

The arrival of Federico Sturzenegger at the Ministry of Deregulation and Transformation of the State and his announcement that he would eliminate the National Institute of Indigenous Affairs (INAI) provoked the rejection of Faustino Peloc, a cacique of the Qolla, who stated that the INAI was a fundamental tool for his peoples. "It helped us a lot; it was created through a law, and it is wrong for this government to want to eliminate it".

=== Educational policy ===
In July 2024, President Javier Milei launched the National Literacy Plan as a space for training, participation, and communication among representatives sent by the educational jurisdictions.

==== Educational vouchers for private schools ====
In March 2024, the launch of educational vouchers was announced, a campaign promise of President Javier Milei. It is a new system of state funding for private education, through which the national government created a subsidy for the legal guardians of students to send students to private schools. The voucher is for families who send their children to private institutions at the initial, primary, and secondary levels with a subsidy of 75% or more and a fee not exceeding $54,396. Initially, the amount of the voucher is 27,000 Argentine pesos (32 USD). As of 10 May, a total of 1 million Argentine students would be covered by the voucher, at a cost to the state of approximately 32 million dollars per month. In July, the duration of the educational program through December 2024 was announced.

==== University policy ====
During the previous administration, the creation of new universities was discussed in Congress, and the creation of the National University of Río Tercero, National University of Pilar, National University of the Delta, and National University of Ezeiza was approved. At the beginning of 2024, the Government halted the opening of the aforementioned institutions, citing budgetary problems and the impossibility of maintaining them, and what it said was to "avoid the duplication and overlap of hierarchical structures and ensure that the educational offer meets the required quality and relevance". On 16 May 2024, the Ministry of Human Capital announced the reactivation only of the creation of the National University of Río Tercero.

===== Budget conflict =====
Faced with the prospect of a general strike by university unions over the national Government's failure to update the budget for higher education after extending it at 2023 values for the year 2024, in March the budget for national universities was increased by 70% in a context of 250% year-on-year inflation. That same month, at a meeting of businesspeople from the energy sector, President Milei again spoke out against public education, both "privately managed" and "state-run", arguing in his speech that they "have done a great deal of harm by brainwashing people".

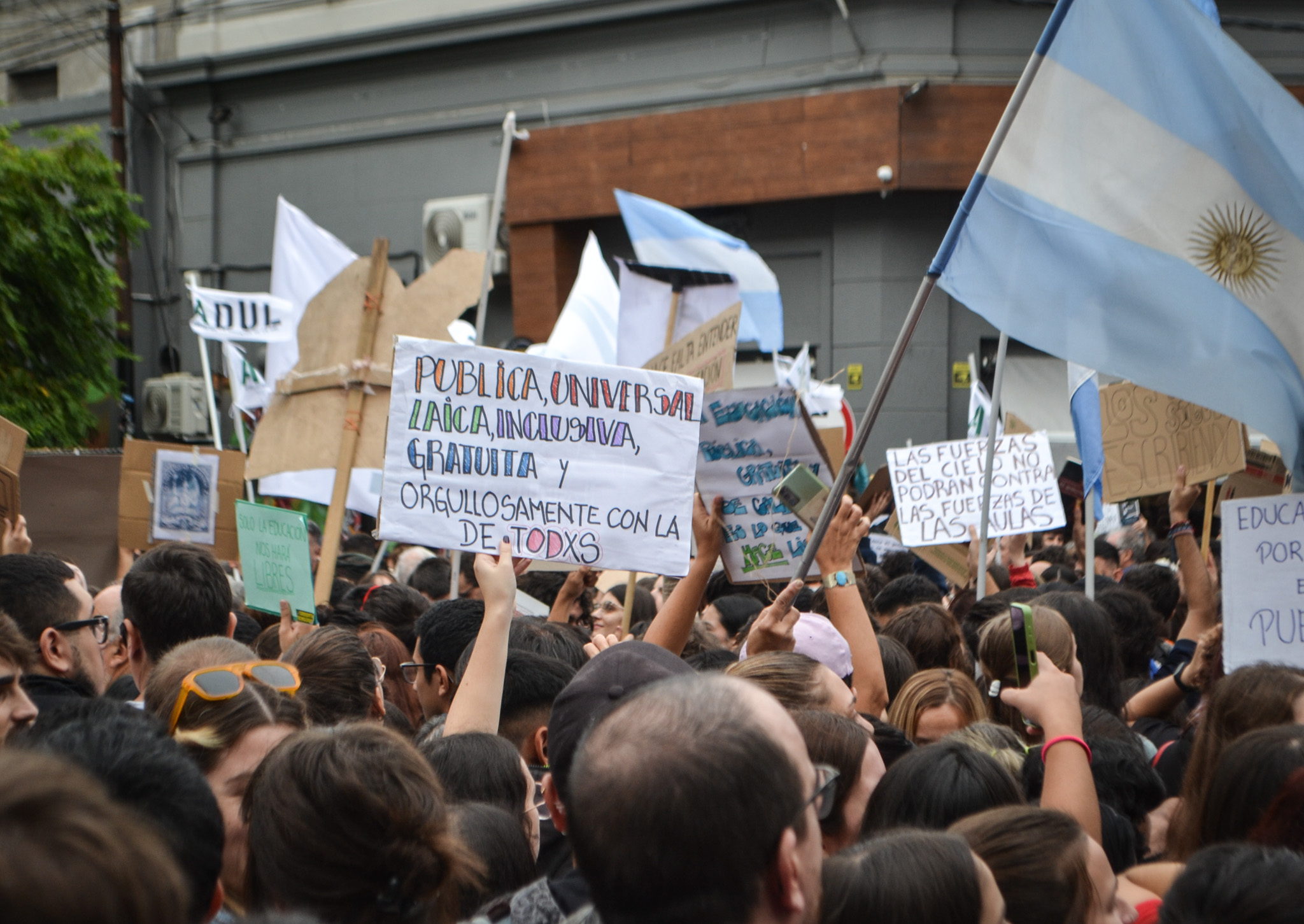
Federal University March, April 2024.

On 23 April 2024, a massive university march took place in Federal Capital, Córdoba, Rosario, Mar del Plata and the main cities of at least 14 provinces in response to the underfunding of the public university system by the Government of Javier Milei and the lack of a budget update for that year. This conflict has been intensifying due to disagreements over the budget allocated to the area and demands from the university sector. The main gathering was in front of the Argentine National Congress, followed by a demonstration in the Plaza de Mayo and a central event in front of the Casa Rosada, where a joint document was read. Various educational institutions, student, scientific, and human-rights organizations, as well as political and union representatives, took part in the march in defense of public and university education. From the Government, through the presidential spokesperson, they asserted that the budget discussion over universities "is settled" and that "the presence of different (political) organizations has turned it into a political march". On 15 May 2024, in an agreement between the Government and the University of Buenos Aires, it was decided to lift the state of budgetary emergency of that institution after agreeing to the transfer from the Ministry of Human Capital of two reinforcement appropriations (one of ARS 26 billion for operating expenses and the second of 35 billion for university hospitals), while at the same time the demand for wage recomposition for teachers and researchers remains. Because only the UBA received funding, that same day the National Interuniversity Council emphasized in a statement that the demand by the other 60 public universities continues and that they are still requesting the transfer of the funds necessary for their operation. The National Interuniversity Council stated that "the salary of university personnel registered a 45% drop in real terms, placing numerous workers below the poverty line, a situation that affects around 50% of the total staff". On 9 August, after a meeting of rectors and union representatives of university teaching and non-teaching staff with Alejandro Álvarez and María Rosana Reggi, undersecretary of University Policies and undersecretary of Development and Modernization of Public Employment respectively, the university unions called a three-day strike starting on 10 August because no agreement was reached on salaries. While the Argentine Government offered a wage increase of 3% for August and 2% for September, the teachers were demanding an increase of 40% to match inflation.

===== Veto of the National Universities Funding Law =====
Proposed by the UCR and Encuentro Federal, it provided for updating the university budget based on the previous year's inflation, and wage recomposition for teaching and non-teaching staff based on the CPI, but subsidiarily to collective bargaining. Despite being approved by both chambers, the government vetoed the law and managed to have the Chamber of Deputies uphold the veto.

===== Changes to the immigration regime =====
In December 2024, the government announced, through the presidential spokesperson, a measure seeking to impose fees on university education and medical services for foreigners not resident in the country. However, there are no foreign students, because one of the requirements to study at university is to have an Argentine DNI. The initiative, included in a broader reform, would entail amending the Higher Education Law (Law 24,521), under which higher education is free of charge, and would allow public universities what, according to the spokesperson, would represent "an alternative source of funding for institutions". Each university would have autonomy to decide whether to implement this fee.

==== Finocchiaro Law ====
On 15 August 2024, two educational bills were approved in the lower chamber of the National Congress. The first was the Finocchiaro Law, proposed and promoted by PRO deputy Alejandro Finocchiaro. The bill declares education to be a "Strategic Essential Service" at all levels and modalities covered by compulsory schooling, establishing that the National State and the provinces must guarantee the full exercise of the right to education throughout the school year on school days affected by strikes, while also regulating the right of teachers to strike. To this end, the initiative provides for a system of mandatory minimum staffing by teaching and non-teaching personnel to ensure the opening of educational establishments throughout the country. Among other points, it proposes that protests be carried out only when 30% of educational staff are available to provide the corresponding services during the first two days of a strike. If it lasts longer, the percentage will increase to 50%.

==== Technical education ====
Since the beginning of Javier Milei's term, the budget for technical and vocational education has maintained a downward trend in real and executed terms. According to reports based on the 2025 and 2026 budget bills, the National Fund for Technical and Vocational Education (FoNETP) has been collapsing: in 2023, close to 50.5% of what corresponded to it was executed; in 2024, 9.4%; and in 2025, 10.8% of the planned resources. Including projected reductions for 2026, this would imply a cumulative reduction of 93% compared with 2023.

=== Science and technology policy ===
The government abolished the Ministry of Science, Technology and Innovation and created the Secretariat of Innovation, Science and Technology. One of the sectors that suffered the most cuts was science, which experienced a 33% drop in its budget in 2024. The biggest drop since 1972, when the budget devoted to science began to be measured. In 2024, the doctoral scholarships of the National Scientific and Technical Research Council (CONICET), Argentina's main scientific research body, were 600, 700 fewer than in 2023. In addition, the body's budget for the year 2024 was not updated and remained identical to that of 2023, without taking into account inflation or the increase in costs between years. A hundred administrative workers of the body were also dismissed. Foreign scientists delivered to the president of Conicet, Daniel Salamone, more than 1,000 letters in support of their Argentine colleagues, among whom were 68 Nobel Prize laureates, warning of a possible fourth wave of "brain drain". (Note: There had been three previous Argentine "brain drains" before the Milei government: two during the military dictatorships of 1966 and 1976. The third was due to the budget cuts of the government of Carlos Menem.)

=== Health policy ===
The Argentine Health Union stated in June 2024 that more than 5,000 private health establishments were on the verge of bankruptcy after signing a wage recomposition for the months of May, June, and July that was approved by the Secretariat of Labor and that would be worsened by the closure of the Federal Administration of Public Revenue. The UAS called for support from the Executive, Legislative, and Judicial branches.

==== 2024 dengue epidemic ====
The dengue epidemic in Argentina during 2024 reached historic proportions, marked by an exponential increase in cases from the beginning of the season. This increase was attributed in part to climate change, which favored the reproduction of the Aedes aegypti mosquito, vector of the dengue virus, through abundant rainfall and high temperatures. In addition, the movement of people between neighboring countries affected by epidemic outbreaks also contributed to the spread of the disease in Argentina. Despite this scenario, the Government ruled out allocating funds for dengue awareness campaigns, as well as the inclusion of the vaccine against this disease in the mandatory vaccination schedule, arguing that it was unnecessary and blaming the previous administration. This situation was worsened by saturation in demand in the public and private health sector, as well as the high costs and lack of protective supplies and medical reagents to diagnose dengue, which generated delays in care and difficulties in controlling the outbreak. On the epidemic, the acting minister, Mario Russo, stated that the vaccine available for it was not useful, "it is not effective for mitigating an outbreak", and downplayed the shortage of repellents, a situation which he summarized as a problem between supply and demand. On 9 May 2024, the Government announced that it would offer the dengue vaccine, but only limited to endemic zones and areas with the highest prevalence of cases.

==== Cuts in PAMI ====
The policies followed by PAMI had been generating concern among pensioners because they were bringing about a reduction in the financing of their treatments, which under previous governments had been 100% for affiliates for some medications. Arguing that the reduction sought savings, in June 2024 a total of 1,200 medications experienced changes in their coverage, affecting essential products such as corticosteroids, antivirals, antibiotics, and anti-inflammatory drugs. From that month onward, medicines that had 100% coverage came to have a copayment percentage ranging from 40 to 80%. In August, 100 percent coverage was cut for 44 medication molecules present in the formulary, after a similar cut of 11 molecules in June of the same year. That translated into one third of the medicines present in the basket no longer being covered, reducing the scope from 3,000 to 2,000. In addition, the number of free boxes of medication that a pensioner can access per month was reduced, from six during the previous administration to five. At the same time, any PAMI affiliate who needs full medication coverage can apply for a "social subsidy", whose requirements are now more restrictive since it is requested that their net income be less than 1.5 minimum pension payments. The agency stated that the measure had "the objective of achieving efficient and planned management of resources in which budgetary sustainability is prioritized in order to safeguard the health of affiliates" and that in recent times molecules had been added for treatments linked to different types of cancer. In December 2024, the PAMI free medication program was eliminated, worsening the crisis in access to certain medicines. According to the words of the PAMI executive director appointed by Milei, only individuals who, after completing a special procedure, did not receive more than one and a half minimum pensions, did not have prepaid health insurance, did not own a car less than 10 years old, and had no more than one property in their name could access medication covered at 100%. It also announced measures to charge non-resident immigrants. This policy was aligned with measures applied in some provinces such as Mendoza, Jujuy and Salta, where specific fees have been established for the care of non-resident foreigners, with the aim of covering the costs of the public health system. The argument behind these proposals includes the lack of reciprocity in neighboring countries and the search for efficiency in the use of public resources.

==== Withdrawal from the WHO ====
In February 2025, the nation's withdrawal from the World Health Organization was announced, arguing a "lack of independence" and "profound differences". With this decision, greater independence was sought so that international organizations would not influence governmental decision-making regarding Argentina's health system. Despite the nation's withdrawal, the economic impact, 8 million dollars, did not affect the WHO.

=== Information and culture policy ===
In mid-March 2024, the government announced, through a resolution published in the Official Gazette, the termination of contracts expiring on March 31 with no possibility of renewal, and a series of cuts to the budget of the National Institute of Cinema and Audiovisual Arts (INCAA), under the Ministry of Human Capital. "In accordance with the measures adopted by the National Government, within the framework of the declared emergency, the highest authority of the Institute understands that it is necessary to take measures aimed at rationalizing and making the Agency more efficient," the text stated. Among other statements, Carlos Pirovano, director of the INCAA appointed by Milei, justified that "It is essential to act urgently and make all necessary efforts to avoid greater economic harm to the Agency." At the same time, the same occurred at Radio Nacional, where a similar situation was witnessed. On May 21, 2024, the temporary suspension of broadcasting from the information technology platforms and social networks of the state-owned communications companies was announced through a government statement, as it was a "reorganization process aimed at improving the production, realization and dissemination of the content that is generated" in order to "unify dissemination criteria (...) until work processes and content production are reorganized". The measure affected Televisión Pública, Radio Nacional, the provincial stations, Radio Nacional Clásica, Radio Nacional Rock, FM Folklórica, Pakapaka and Canal Encuentro, as well as non-state media because they could not place official government advertising. The Buenos Aires Press Union issued a statement on behalf of public media workers denouncing a "plan of destruction" by the Government and "this new display of censorship and intimidation that adds to the silencing of Télam". That same month, Mariela Belski, executive director of Amnesty International in the country, denounced before the Inter-American Commission on Human Rights "the deterioration and impact on freedom of expression and information" that Argentina is suffering. She also accused Milei and his cabinet of viciousness and aggression through social networks and other strategies. Finally, she accused the government of restricting access to press conferences and of the prior censorship suffered by journalists. In the statement, Amnesty International also warned about the Casa Rosada's announcement of issuing political guidelines for accreditation and that this could lead to selecting which journalists may ask questions, and it questioned "the arbitrariness with which the government decided to remove Silvia Mercado's accreditation".

==== Closure of Télam ====
In December 2023, through a necessity and urgency decree, the government transformed all companies belonging to the State into corporations, which included the state news agency Télam, which he branded a "Kirchnerist propaganda agency". On March 1, 2024, during his speech at the opening of the ordinary sessions of the Congress, Milei confirmed the intention to close Télam. The Argentine Journalism Forum warned about the situation and called for respect for freedom of expression. During the early hours of March 4, 2024, the website was taken down, the two buildings appeared fenced off, and employees reported that they began receiving telegrams notifying them that they were "relieved" from providing services for one week. Finally, on July 1, the government announced the transformation of Télam into a State propaganda company, renaming it Agencia de Publicidad del Estado Sociedad Anónima Unipersonal (APESA), whose objective is the production and distribution of national or international advertising material, within the country and abroad, operating from a commercial approach.

=== Human rights policy ===
Both Javier Milei and his administration have been accused by various opposition figures and political sectors of being denialists and historical revisionists because of their controversial critical positions toward the human rights violations that occurred during the last Argentine military dictatorship. At the end of March 2024, the Ministry of Defense led by Luis Petri announced the dismantling of the Survey and Analysis Teams. In addition, both Bullrich and Petri did not send the information required by the National Commission for the Right to Identity, the Executive Branch body serving as the channel for the search for children kidnapped during the dictatorship and from which 90% of the genetic data for testing comes. On August 15, 2024, the government eliminated by decree the Special Investigative Unit on the Disappearance of Children as a Consequence of the Actions of State Terrorism, under the National Commission for the Right to Identity. The Unit assisted in investigations related to the appropriation of minors by the last military dictatorship. In December of that year, the government closed the Haroldo Conti Cultural Center, which operated on the grounds of the former Navy Petty-Officers School (ESMA), and fired all the employees.

==== Criticism from international organizations ====
In February 2024, the Inter-American Commission on Human Rights and the IACHR Special Rapporteurship for Freedom of Expression expressed great concern over the disproportionate use of public force against Argentine protesters and journalists, urging the Milei government to respect the rights to freedom of expression, peaceful assembly, and journalistic work, and to guarantee safety. In June 2024, the human rights high commissioner of the United Nations objected to some of the policies adopted and urged him to "build a more inclusive society". Volker Türk considered in June that the months of the Milei government's administration represent a "setback" of rights in the nation and that the "proposed and adopted measures risk undermining the protection of human rights". In the list of measures he made were cuts to public spending, the closure of institutions dedicated to women's rights, access to justice, and the instruction to suspend Argentina's participation in events related to the 2030 Agenda. He also considered that the policies carried out "particularly affect the most marginalized", and therefore urged the authorities to place "human rights at the center of their policymaking, to build a more cohesive and inclusive society. This also means full respect for the right of peaceful assembly and freedom of expression". One month later, the Inter-American Commission on Human Rights and the SRFOE again drew the government's attention to its setbacks in the field of human rights and the limitations on the freedom of expression of the nation's citizens and on their right to protest as a vital and important tool in democracy for the conquest of other rights.

==== Visit to those convicted of crimes against humanity ====
On Thursday, July 11, six deputies from La Libertad Avanza, Beltrán Benedit, Lourdes Arrieta, Guillermo Montenegro, Rocío Bonacci, Alida Ferreyra and María Fernanda Araujo, made a visit organized by the Entre Ríos legislator Benedit and Montenegro, at Prison Unit No. 31 in Ezeiza, to several repressors detained for crimes against humanity, among them Alfredo Astiz, on whom two life sentences weigh for genocide, baby theft, rapes, and disappearances. At the meeting, those present received judicial advice from lawyers specializing in crimes against humanity. One day earlier, in the WhatsApp group where the libertarian legislators were present, Benedit wrote that the tour consisted of going "to visit the prisoners" and clarified that it would be "a humanitarian visit from politics", without specifying that it involved Astiz and company. The deputies found out in the middle of the trip, and a heated argument ensued. Benedit mounted a defense of the convicted men in the WhatsApp group, denying that they were repressors and instead calling them "ex-combatants against Marxist subversion". He also branded the trials a sham, threatened to denounce the judges, and advocated a pardon by President Milei despite the impossibility of doing so because they were sentenced to life imprisonment for crimes against humanity. Bonacci rebuked him in the chat, writing: "I was reproached that I always handled legislative procedure without previously reaching consensus with the executive, and on the other hand they go and organize a visit to Ezeiza to visit these guys. Without clarifying it beforehand, painting it as a humanitarian visit, classifying them as Malvinas ex-combatants, which is not the title that fits them". The Argentine Episcopal Conference showed its displeasure over the visit, since the ultraconservative priest Javier Olivera Ravasi, son of Jorge Antonio Olivera, and known in religious circles for his ultra statements, played a key role in it. In this way, the spokesman for the Argentine Episcopal Conference, Máximo Jurcinović, stated that "what was expressed and done by priest Javier Olivera Ravasi in relation to the visit by a group of deputies to Ezeiza prison does not correspond either to the thinking or to the attitude of the AEC". The Bishopric of Zárate-Campana expelled Javier Olivera due to "numerous well-founded complaints about his expressions and attitudes that were opposed to Christian witness" that had been occurring for some time, and this was the trigger. In light of this controversial situation, Security Minister Patricia Bullrich stated: "They are personal decisions, they are not institutional decisions, and each person has to take responsibility for what they do; that is freedom". Coinciding with the Milei siblings' visit to France, the lawyer for French people disappeared during the Argentine dictatorship, Sophie Thonon, asked the French president, Emmanuel Macron, to express his repudiation to Javier Milei over the visit made by the deputies. After an investigation, it came to light that contacts between members of La Libertad Avanza and the detained military officers had been in the making since March 2024. On that occasion, they visited the priest Christian Von Wernich, sentenced to life imprisonment for 34 kidnappings, 31 acts of torture and 7 murders; and the police officer Julio Simón, known for his viciousness toward Jewish victims whom he tortured while carrying a Nazi pennant. On that occasion they were outlining a possible decree declaring that their crimes could no longer be prosecuted due to the passage of time. When the various meetings became known, on August 5, 2024, the different human rights organizations and Nobel Prize laureate Adolfo Pérez Esquivel demanded the expulsion from the government of the deputies who had attended the different meetings. In parallel, the Federal Oral Tribunal filed criminal charges against the LLA deputies and prison staff of the Federal Penitentiary Service who held the meetings, among whom were Beltrán Benedit, Guillermo Montenegro, María Fernanda Araujo, Alida Ferreyra, Rocío Bonacci and Lourdes Arrieta. The visit was harshly criticized by the opposition blocs, because it was "an affront to the victims, their families and all the Argentine people"; and by the rest of the libertarian deputies, triggering internal conflict in the ruling bloc and a tense relationship with allies. Rocío Bonacci stated, among other declarations, that she had been deceived by Benedit into attending. Arrieta alleged that "I can't say whether everyone knew it or not, but in the case of deputy Bonacci and me, we started talking about this issue because at one point we felt anguish and went into a state of shock" She also stated that she "did not know some of those present who had been convicted" and that she had to google them. Days after the scandal, Lourdes Arrieta appeared in Congress with the book Nunca más, which contains the report issued by the National Commission on the Disappearance of Persons during the military dictatorship, showed her regret for having trusted her colleagues and having visited Astiz. She also revealed that Benedit organized the visit and that Gabriel Bornoroni endorsed it as an official and institutional visit that had the approval of the Casa Rosada and the president of the Chamber of Deputies, Martín Menem. The following day, Arrieta filed a criminal complaint so that her own bloc colleagues and officials of the Penitentiary Service and the lower chamber would be investigated. For his part, Menem responded by rejecting any connection of the government to the defense of the imprisoned repressors. He said it was an individual act by a "minority group of deputies". Deputy Lilia Lemoine defended her colleagues' visit to the detainees. She stated that it was a human rights matter, "a visit to octogenarians in prison who say they are being sentenced to death by drip". Pope Francis, who only a week earlier had visited a relative of a nun who was murdered during the dictatorship, on August 7 received a person affected by the dictatorship, who stated that "she had learned that some deputies had visited Astiz, that they were trying to make sure they would not remain imprisoned, and that this was something very dangerous". She also added that they should not let up and should preserve "the memory of what you have received, not only of the ideas but of the testimonies, that is the message I give you". Along with the criminal complaints already filed by lawyer Pablo Llonto, Félix Croux, prosecutor of the Anti-Corruption Office; and Lourdes Arrieta, on August 9 prosecutor of the Federal Tribunal Sergio Mola searched Ezeiza prison to obtain the entry and visitation logs of former Unit 31 and the recordings from the security cameras. Nicolás Mayoraz, Beltrán Bénedit and the bloc leader, Gabriel Bornoroni, confronted Lourdes Arrieta for having given details of the visit. Lorena Villaverde requested the expulsion of Arrieta herself and Bonacci from the LLA. Lemoine, at a press conference, disqualified her colleague Arrieta and launched several accusations against Arrieta's lawyer in the case of the visit. Lourdes Arrieta was removed from her position as attorney-in-fact for La Libertad Avanza in Mendoza and announced before the Chamber of Deputies the creation of her own bloc called "Fuerzas del Cielo - Espacio Liberal (FE)" (Forces of Heaven - Liberal Space), in which Judeo-Christian and liberal values would be defended; and whose color would be violet.

== Foreign policy ==
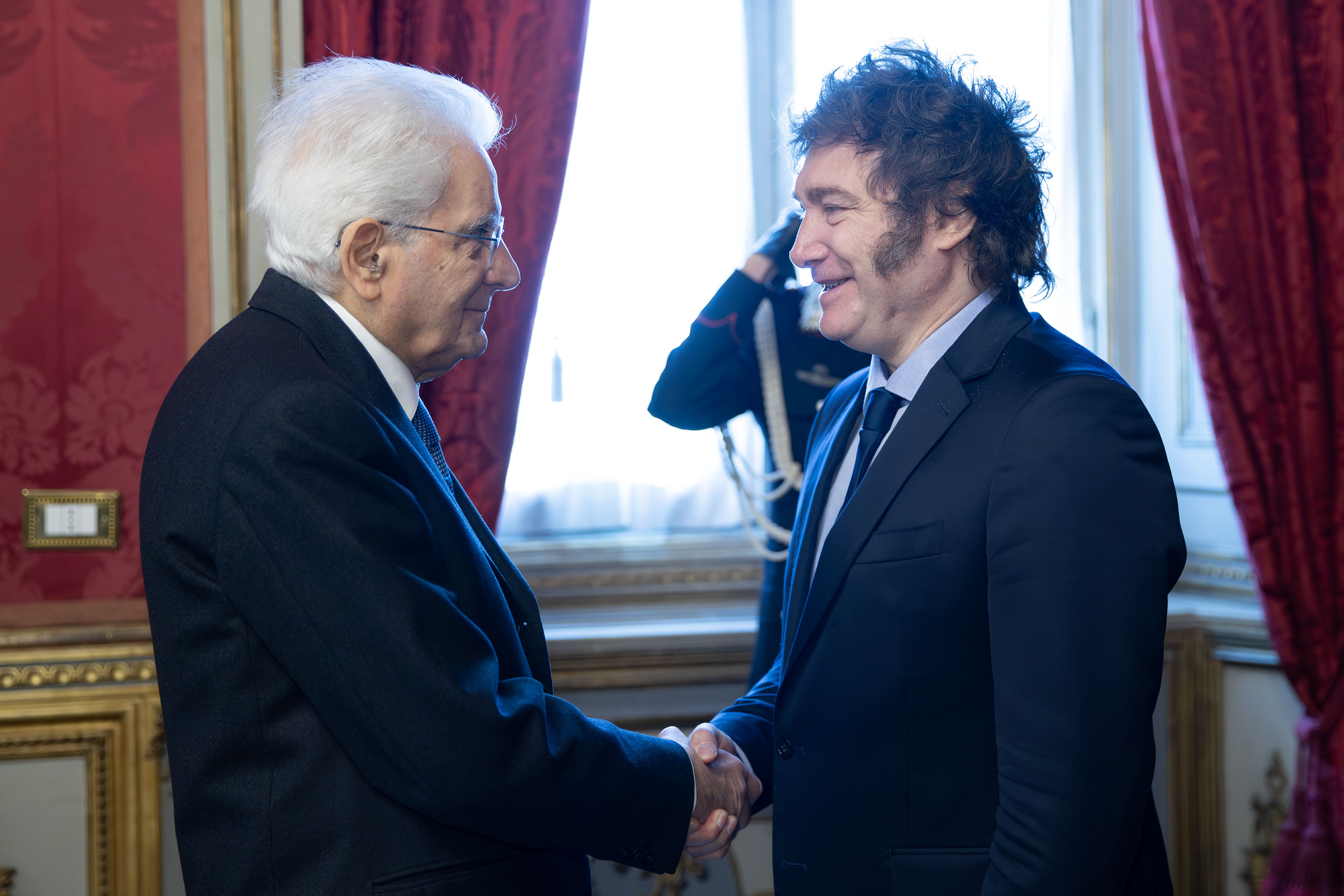
Milei with Italian president Sergio Mattarella

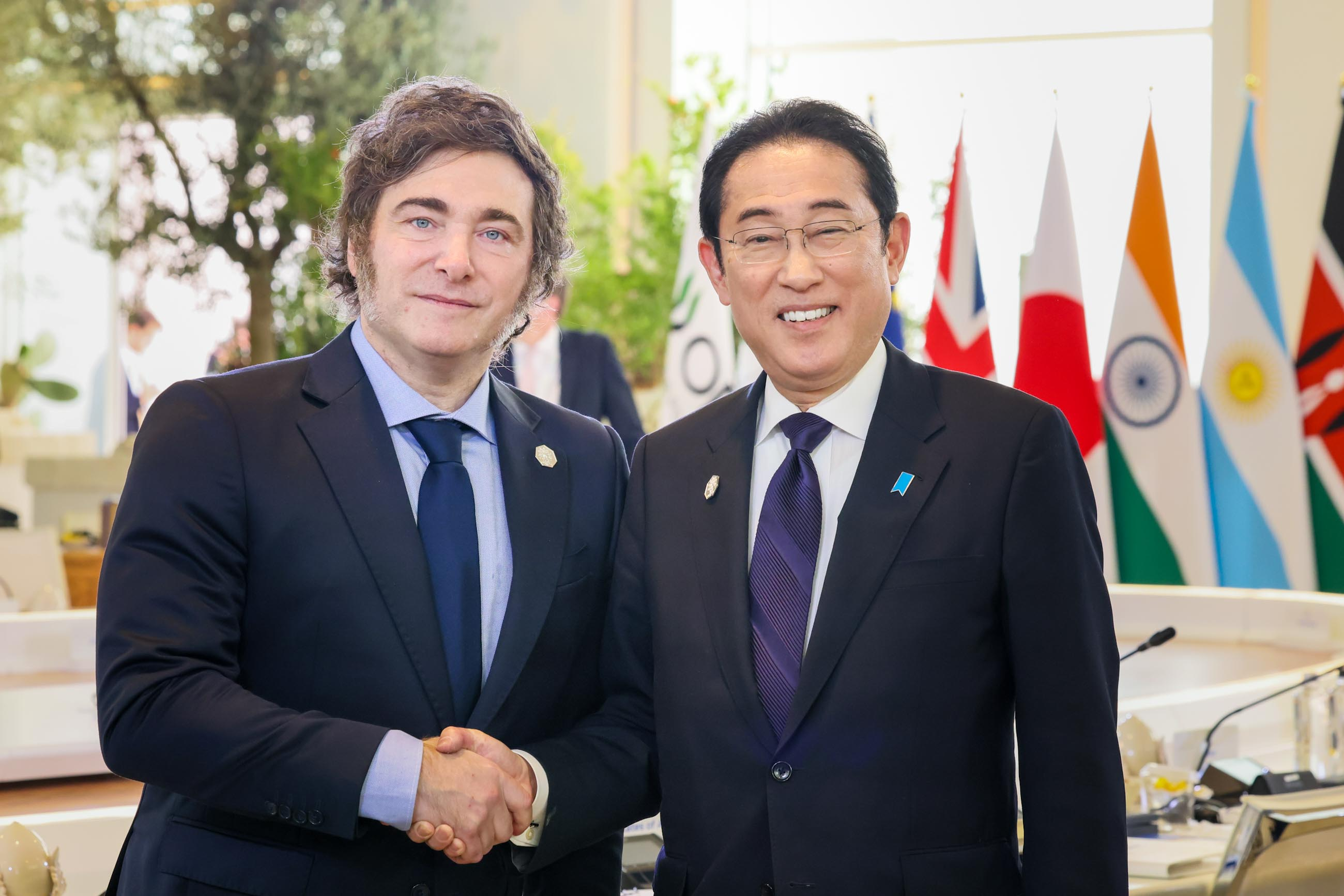
Milei with Japanese Prime Minister Fumio Kishida at the 50th G7 summit on 14 June 2024

On 10 December, economist and economics academic Diana Mondino was formally appointed as Minister of Foreign Affairs, International Trade and Worship. Mondino was removed from her position in October 2024, following a vote against the US embargo on Cuba at the United Nations, which Milei had ordered to support. She was replaced by then ambassador to the US Gerardo Werthein, who stayed in the Ministry for a year, until his resignation in October 2025.

=== Americas ===
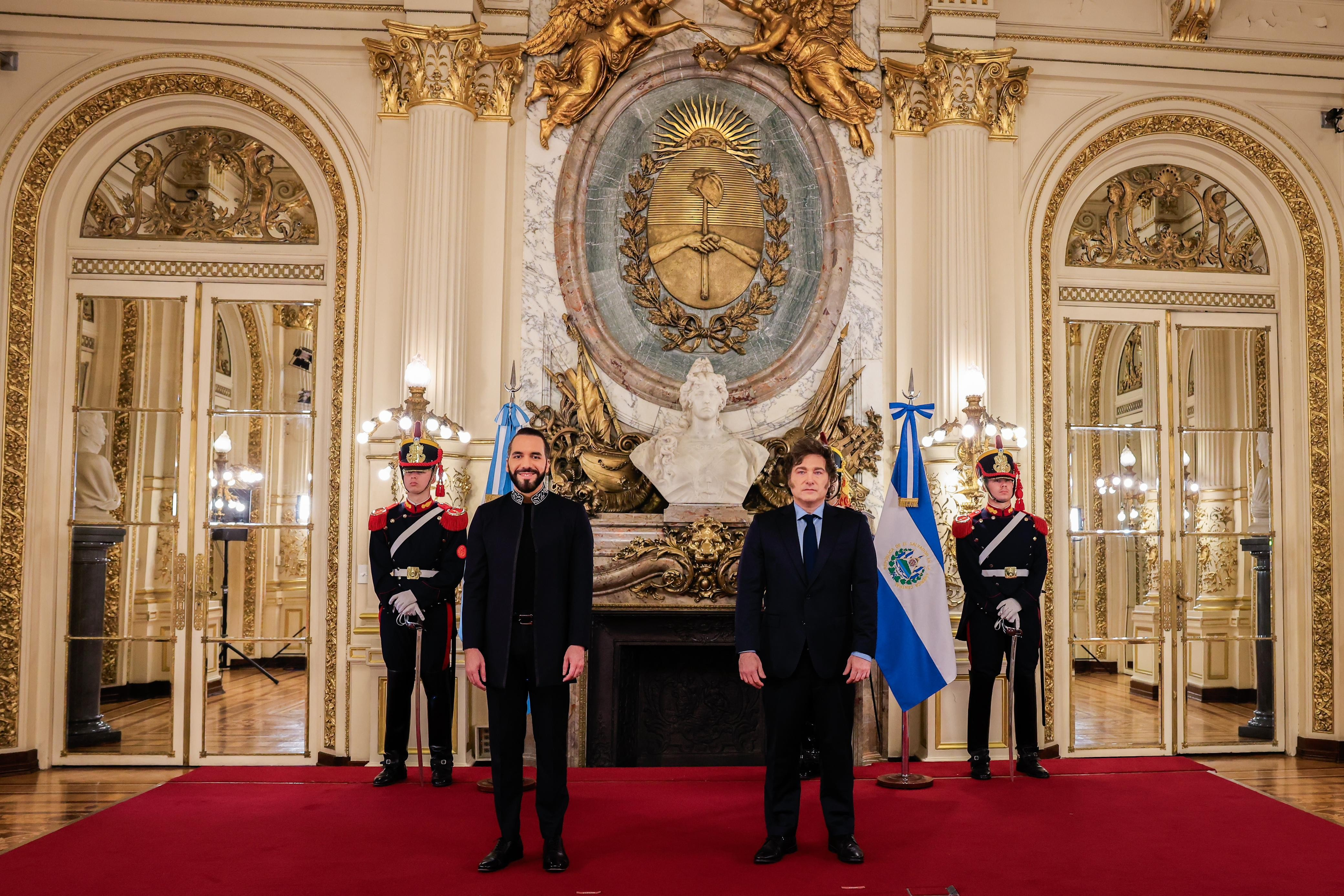
Javier Milei And Salvadoran president Bukele

Milei's government decided to suspend diplomatic relations with Cuba, Nicaragua, and Venezuela. After his inauguration, Milei ordered that Argentina would not send ambassadors to any of those three countries, which Milei has previously labelled as dictatorships. Relations with Venezuela have deteriorated rapidly under the presidency of Milei with the Argentine Embassy in Venezuela twice falling under siege during the Venezuelan post-electoral crisis.

In January 2024, Argentina offered military assistance to Ecuador in its conflict with organised crime. On 13 January, Ecuadorian president Daniel Noboa accepted Argentina's (and the US's) military aid.

On 25 January 2024, Colombia summoned its ambassador in Argentina to protest recent comments by Javier Milei, where Milei called Colombian president Gustavo Petro a "murderous communist who is sinking Colombia". The Colombian ambassador labelled Milei as a "hypocrite" and condemned his comments.

Durings his tenure, Milei has had two non-official visits to Spain and one to Chile. In these visits where he participated in private events, he took occasion to criticise the prime minister of Spain Pedro Sánchez and the president of Chile Gabriel Boric.

Milei ordered to vote in favor of the US embargo on Cuba. It was the first time in history that Argentina supported the blockade, voting along six other countries: the US, Israel, Hungary, Paraguay, North Macedonia, and Ukraine. In January 2026, Milei celebrated the capture of Nicolás Maduro on social media, posting on X: "liberty advances, ¡Viva la libertad, carajo!". In a later interview, Milei expressed support for the US taking charge of the oil industry in Venezuela, which Milei said will "cut supply to communists."

After the British naval patrol ship HMS Medway –which is based in the Fakland Islands– visited Punta Arenas in Chile in July 2026 Argentina issued notes of protest to both the Chilean and the British governments. With regards to Chile this was for aledgelly allowing the violation of the neutrality of the Strait of Magellan as established in the Boundary Treaty of 1881 between Chile and Argentina. In 2022 Chile prevented the resupplying of HMS Forth in Punta Arenas, a move that was seen favourable to the Argentine foreign policy. The note to the British government protested an "unconsulted and illegal journey" of HMS Medway.

==== United States ====
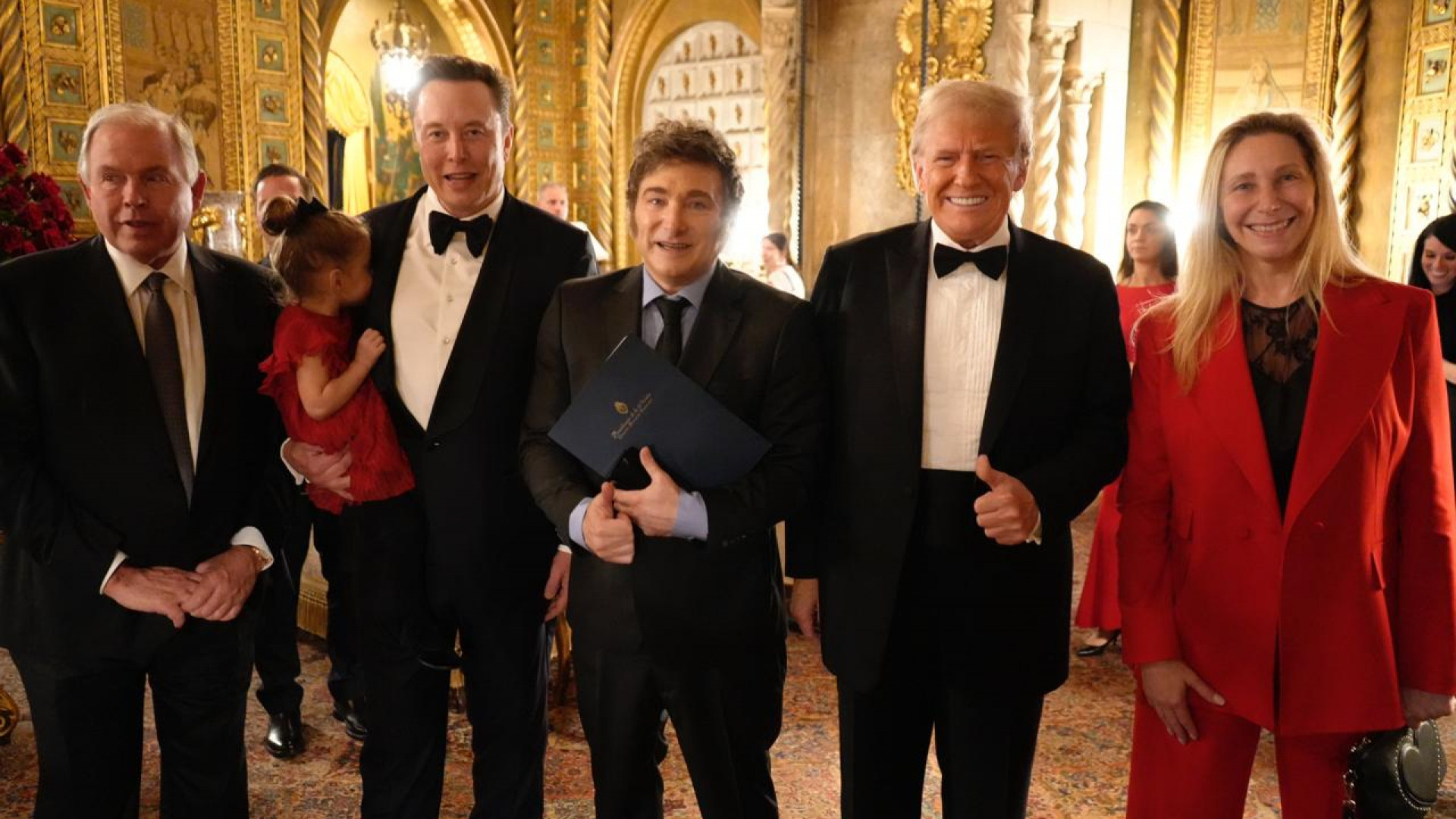
Milei with Elon Musk and the newly elected president of the United States, Donald Trump, on November 14, 2024, during the America First Policy Institute gala.

As Milei announced in his statements, Argentina would be a partner of the United States, regardless of whether Republicans or Democrats were in government. The first trip he made as president-elect was to the United States, during the presidency of Democrat Joe Biden, where he met with officials from the White House and the Department of the Treasury. During his first year in office, Milei made 7 trips to the United States for different reasons. In February 2024, Biden's secretary of state, Antony Blinken, visited the country.

In April 2024, the president met with the commander of the United States Southern Command, Laura Richardson, with the aim of advancing the signing of a technical assistance and information-sharing agreement so that engineers from that country could work on the project for the construction of the Integrated Naval Base in Ushuaia.

On November 14, 2024, Milei was the first foreign leader to meet with the president-elect of the United States, Donald Trump, when they greeted each other at the America First Policy Institute (AFPI) gala at Mar-a-Lago, in Palm Beach, Florida, during which the Argentine stated in his speech that Trump wanted to "copy his economic model". There he also met with business magnate Elon Musk, with whom he developed a friendly relationship after several social media exchanges and informal meetings, and who was influenced by Milei's ideas on cutting public spending to propose the creation of the Department of Government Efficiency (DOGE).

In January 2025, he was one of the presidents invited to Trump's presidential inauguration. In February, the United States imposed a 25% tariff on all imports of aluminum and steel, affecting Argentine exports which in 2024 reached some 600 million dollars annually, mainly from the company Aluar and the Techint Group, through its companies Ternium and Tenaris. Trump had already enacted that measure in his first government, but Macri managed to have the U.S. president exempt Argentina from that burden during his administration. In April, Argentina remained in the group of Latin American countries with the standard 10% tariff after the announcements of the Liberation Day tariffs.

In October 2025, the United States and Argentina signed a currency swap agreement for 20 billion dollars through the U.S. Treasury's Exchange Stabilization Fund, aimed at stabilizing the Argentine economy and strengthening the balance sheet of the Central Bank of Argentina. In addition, United States Secretary of the Treasury Scott Bessent made a purchase of pesos to stabilize their value, which was experiencing high volatility prior to the 2025 Argentine legislative election.

On November 13, 2025, the White House issued a statement announcing a framework for a United States-Argentina Agreement on Reciprocal Trade and Investment, with the aim of strengthening the bilateral strategic alliance, promoting long-term economic growth, and creating a transparent, rules-based environment for trade and innovation. This agreement builds on the trade and investment reforms already implemented by Argentina and seeks to balance the economic relationship between the two countries.

The key elements of the agreement include:

- Tariffs and market access: Mutual reduction of tariffs on key products, such as pharmaceuticals, chemicals, machinery, information technologies, medical devices, motor vehicles, and a wide range of agricultural products. The United States will eliminate reciprocal tariffs on certain unavailable natural resources and non-patented items for pharmaceutical applications, considering the impact of the agreement on national security under Section 232 of the Trade Expansion Act of 1962. In addition, the countries commit to improving conditions for reciprocal access to the bilateral market for beef trade.
- Elimination of non-tariff barriers: Argentina has dismantled several non-tariff barriers, such as import licenses, and commits not to require consular formalities for U.S. exports. It will also gradually eliminate the statistical tax for U.S. goods.
- Standards and conformity assessment: Argentina will align its standards with international ones to facilitate trade, accepting U.S. goods that comply with U.S. or international technical regulations or conformity procedures. It will allow the import of vehicles manufactured in the U.S. according to federal safety and emissions standards, and will accept FDA certificates for medical and pharmaceutical devices.
- Intellectual property: Argentina will take measures against notorious markets for counterfeit goods and will improve enforcement against pirated products, including in online environments. It will address structural challenges identified in the Office of the United States Trade Representative's 2025 Special 301 Report, such as patentability criteria, patent backlogs, and geographical indications, aligning its intellectual property regime with international standards.
- Agricultural market access: Argentina will open its market to live U.S. cattle, will allow access for poultry within one year, and will not restrict access for products using certain cheese and meat terms. It will simplify registration processes for U.S. beef, meat products, and pork products, and will not apply facility registration requirements to dairy imports. Both countries will work to address non-tariff barriers in food and agricultural products.
- Labor rights: Argentina reaffirms its commitment to internationally recognized labor rights, will adopt prohibitions on imports of goods produced with forced labor, and will strengthen enforcement of labor laws.
- Environment: Argentina will take measures to combat illegal logging, promote a more resource-efficient economy (including critical minerals), and will fully implement the WTO Agreement on Fisheries Subsidies.
- Alignment on economic security: Greater cooperation to combat non-market policies and practices of other countries, aligning approaches on export controls, investment security, tariff evasion, and other issues.
- Trade considerations and opportunities: Cooperation to facilitate investment and trade in critical minerals, and efforts to stabilize global soybean trade.
- State-owned enterprises and subsidies: Argentina will address trade-distorting actions by state-owned enterprises and industrial subsidies that affect the bilateral trade relationship.
- Digital trade: Argentina will facilitate digital trade by recognizing the U.S. as an adequate jurisdiction for cross-border data transfers (including personal data), avoiding discrimination against U.S. digital services or products, and recognizing electronic signatures valid under U.S. law.

Both countries will work to finalize the text of the agreement, completing domestic formalities for its entry into force. Implementation will be reviewed through the Trade and Investment Framework Agreement and the Innovation and Creativity for Economic Development Forum.

=== China ===
During the campaign for the 2023 elections, Milei said that he would not make deals with China, because of his rejection to communism and his support to freedom and democracy. Despite this, China did not formally protest and sent, as the country's representative to attend Milei's presidential inauguration, the vice chairman of the Standing Committee of the National People's Congress, Wu Weihua. Once Milei was in government there were no diplomatic conflicts with China. Just two days after taking office, Milei sent a letter to the president of China, Xi Jinping, requesting the renewal of the currency swap for US$5 billion, granted to the previous administration, in order to guarantee the payment of maturities with the International Monetary Fund. In June 2024, the People's Bank of China accepted the renewal of the swap until 2026.

The renewal of the swaps, the soy trade, the joint building of the Jorge Cepernic and Néstor Kirchner dams, and the negotiations with the IMF led to cordial relations between both countries. By September 2024, Milei had changed his opinion regarding China, stating that he was pleasantly surprised by that country's attitude and that it was a very interesting trading partner, which demanded nothing and only asked not to be disturbed.

In November of that year, within the framework of the G20 summit in Brazil, Milei met with Xi Jinping, where he thanked China for its support in stabilizing Argentina's economic situation and endorsed the One-China principle.

Milei's then Foreign Minister, Diana Mondino, confirmed that Argentina rejected its invitation to join the BRICS group of nations, and that the country had instead chosen to sign its membership request to OECD.

=== Middle East ===
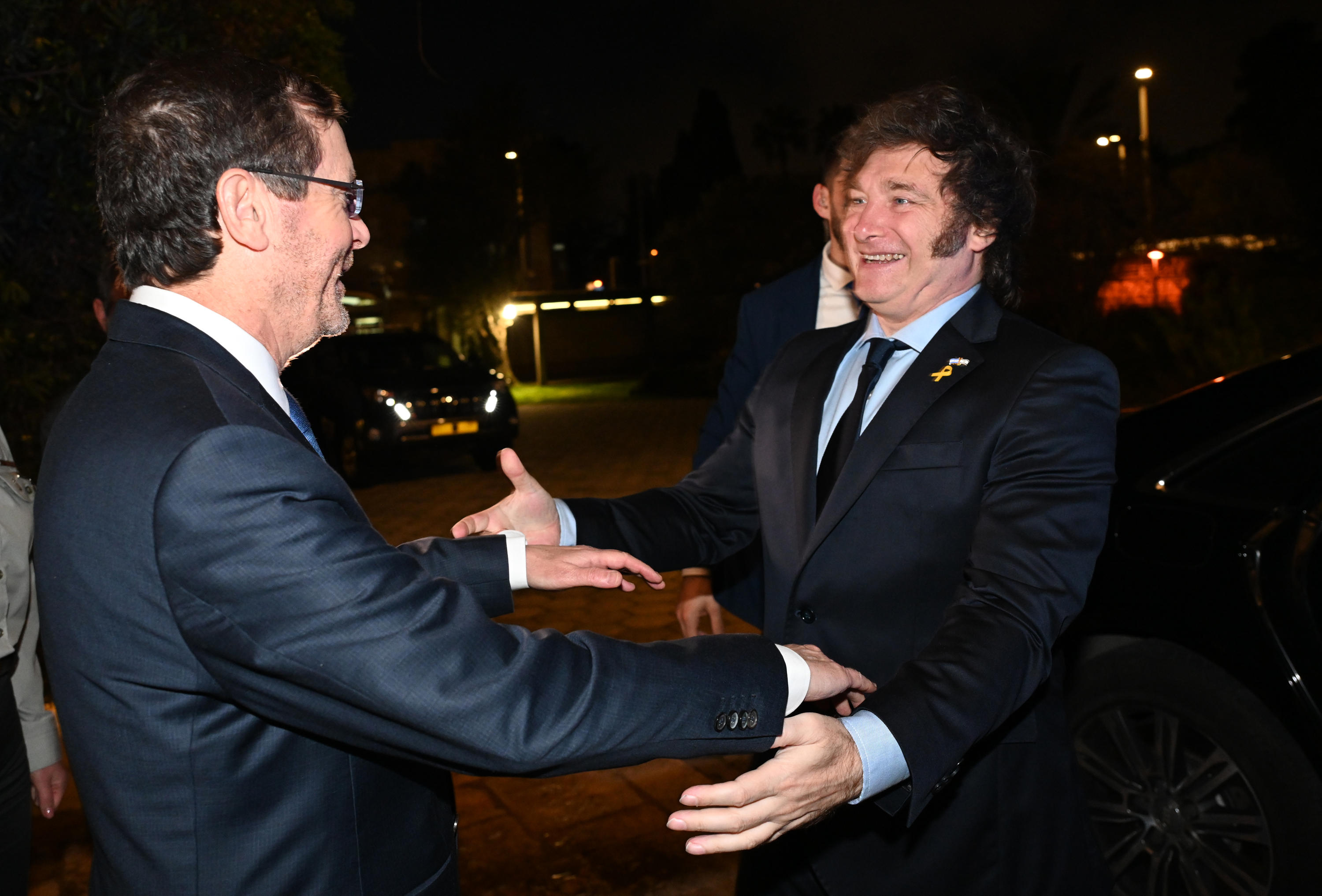
Milei and Israeli President Isaac Herzog in Jerusalem on 6 February 2024

On 12 December 2023, Argentina changed its position before the United Nations in regard to the ongoing Gaza war. Argentina, which had voted in favor of a ceasefire in the General Assembly Resolution ES-10/21, switched to abstaining in the Resolution ES-10/22. Analysts said the move showed a clearer support for Israel from Milei. On 14 January 2024, on the occasion of the hundredth day of war between Israel and Hamas, Milei expressed solidarity with the government and people of Israel, further adding that Argentina "endorses Israel's right to legitimate defence". On 5 February 2024, he commenced his inaugural state visit to Israel as president. There, Milei met with President of Israel Isaac Herzog and Prime Minister of Israel Benjamin Netanyahu, to whom he confirmed Argentina's embassy in Israel will move from Tel Aviv to Jerusalem.

In June 2024, Milei received the ILAN Award for Political Innovation, presented by Isaac Assa, president of the Israel Latin American Network (ILAN).

Milei celebrated June 2025 Israeli strikes on Iran, stating that "today is a great day for Western civilization".

Milei supported the United States and Israel during the 2026 Iran war. See: Argentina in the 2026 Iran war

=== Russo-Ukrainian War ===
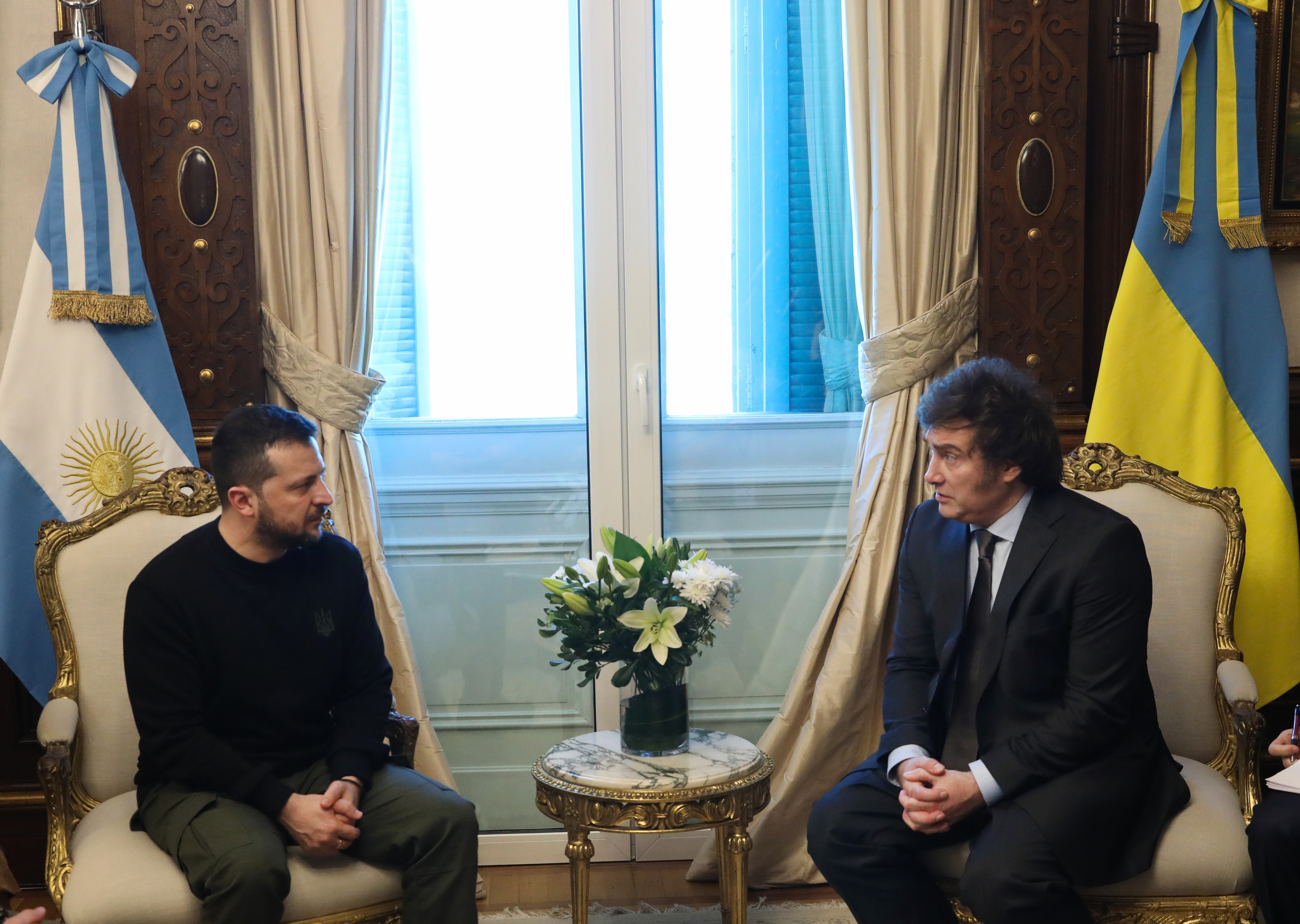
Milei with Volodymyr Zelenskyy, December 10, 2023.

Since Milei's inauguration, Argentina changed its neutral position in the Russo-Ukrainian War. The first indication of this change was the invitation to the president of Ukraine, Volodymyr Zelenskyy, to his presidential inauguration. Zelenskyy attended, making it his first trip to Latin America since the start of the conflict, but Russia decided not to send any high-ranking diplomatic official, except for the ambassador in Buenos Aires, Dmitri Feoktístov.

Milei met with Ukrainian president Volodymyr Zelenskyy in Buenos Aires on 10 December 2023. On 16 December, Milei's government announced through the Air Force, that it would donate two Russian-made Mil Mi-17 military helicopters to Ukraine.

On June 14, 2024, Argentina joined the Ukraine Defense Contact Group (UDCG), an international coalition of 54 countries that coordinates humanitarian aid and military assistance to Ukraine. One day later, Milei participated in the Global Peace Summit on Ukraine held in Switzerland. There he stated:

I want to express, on behalf of the Argentine people, our utmost support for the people of Ukraine and for our friend President Zelenskyy, since as defenders of freedom we reject any form of violence.

=== European Union ===
On 22 June 2024, Milei met with German Chancellor Olaf Scholz. Milei and Scholz voiced support for the European Union–Mercosur free trade agreement. Two days later, Milei visited Czechia and was greeted by Czech president Petr Pavel and prime minister Petr Fiala.

==== Conflict with Spain ====
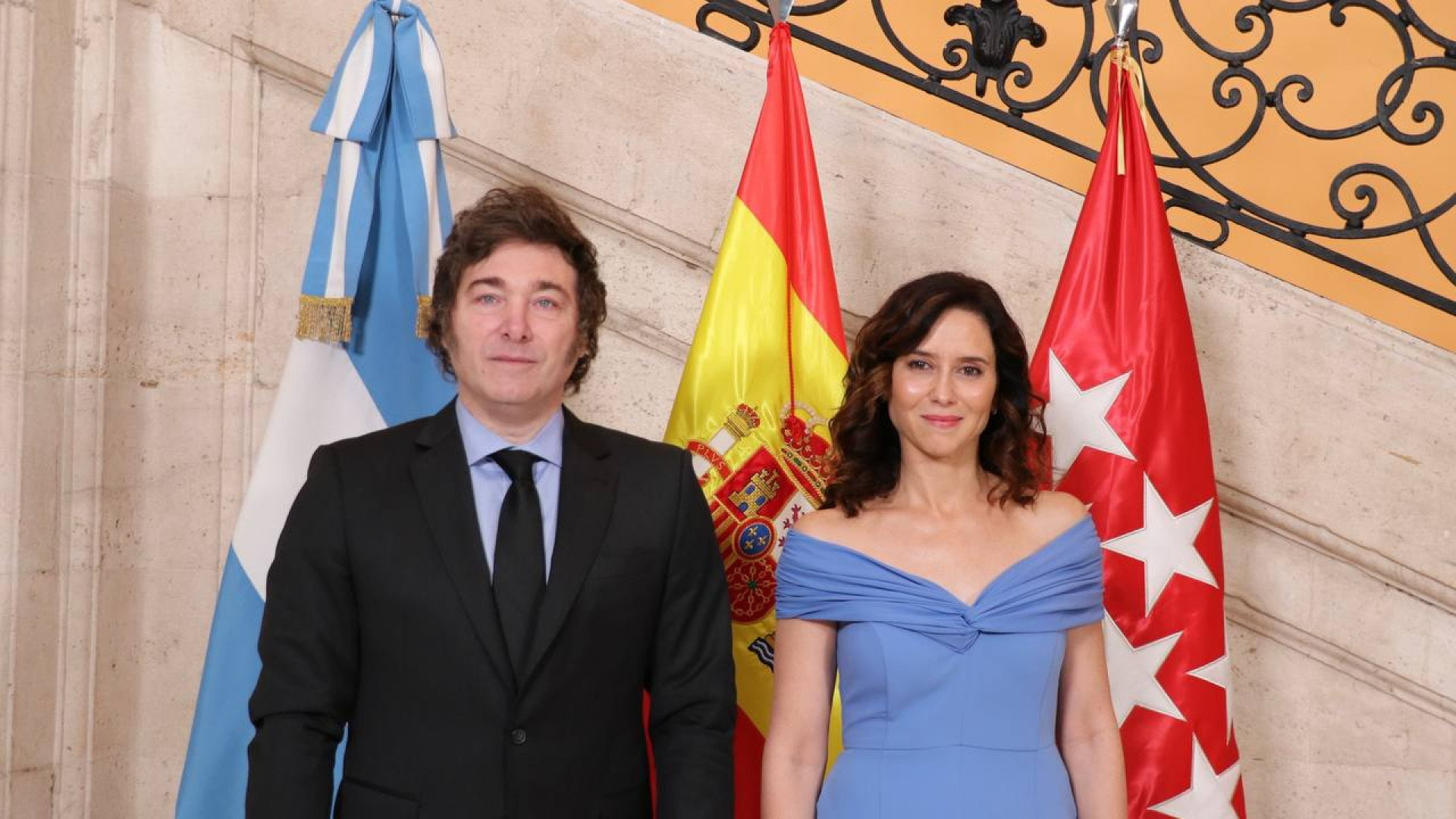
Milei with Isabel Díaz Ayuso, June 21, 2024.

Since May 2024, Argentina-Spain relations became strained following the statement made by Spanish minister Óscar Puente toward Milei, suggesting that the Argentine president "takes substances" before his television appearances. The Argentine government then expressed itself through a statement on X criticizing not only Minister Puente but also Pedro Sánchez, Prime Minister of Spain, and his wife, Begoña Gómez, who was under investigation for alleged corruption. The Government of Spain rejected the statement.

On May 19, 2024, Milei took part in the partisan event "Viva 24" organized by Vox to bring together various far-right parties from around the world in Spain. At that Vox partisan event, Milei delivered a speech in which he referred to the Spanish president and his wife in these terms:

Even when he has a corrupt wife, he gets dirty, and takes five days to think about it.

That same day, the Government of Spain withdrew its ambassador to Argentina and demanded an apology from President Milei:

The extremely serious words spoken today by Javier Milei in Madrid go beyond any kind of political and ideological differences; they have no precedent in the history of international relations... Mutual respect and non-interference in internal affairs is an unbreakable principle in international relations, and it is unacceptable for a sitting president, on a visit to Spain, to insult Spain and the President of the Government of Spain... I want to inform you that I have just spoken with Josep Borrell, the High Representative of the European Union, who tells me that he considers an attack of this magnitude on a member state also to be an attack on the European Union as a whole... For this reason, I announce to you that I have just recalled our Ambassador in Buenos Aires for consultations, sine die. In addition, Spain also demands public apologies from Mr. Javier Milei.

On May 20, Milei, in a television interview, stated that he was not going to apologize, emphasized that he had not used names in his phrase, and expanded his criticism of the Spanish president by calling him a "coward"; he maintained that he had been the one attacked by the Spanish president and that it was a systematic aggression originating in Kirchnerism.

In light of Milei's refusal to apologize, Spain definitively withdrew its ambassador to Argentina.

For its part, the Argentine government ruled out a diplomatic conflict and announced that it would not withdraw its ambassador in Spain. It also criticized Sánchez's actions through presidential spokesperson Manuel Adorni: "If the president and the officials of the Kingdom of Spain want to take responsibility for the criticisms that President Milei made toward socialism and corruption, that is not a problem for our Republic. As is vulgarly always said, if the shoe fits, wear it".

On June 21, 2024, Milei traveled to Spain to meet with the president of the Community of Madrid, Isabel Díaz Ayuso, and receive an award from the Juan de Mariana Institute. There he was awarded the Medal of the Community of Madrid and delivered a speech in which he mentioned Sánchez:

To conclude, I want to tell you two phrases, one by Mises and one by Hayek. Mises's phrase says that knowledge in economics leads to liberalism. And a phrase by Hayek says that, if socialists understood economics, they would not be socialists. Well, it seems that one of the exceptions to the rule is made by you with Mr. Sánchez, who evidently, despite having studied economics, either did not understand it or likes the state very much in order to run roughshod over Spaniards.

On that occasion, he requested an audience with monarch Felipe VI, which was denied.

Finally, on October 29 of that same year, the Spanish government appointed an ambassador of Spain to Argentina, despite the fact that Milei never apologized for his statements, bringing the diplomatic crisis to an end.

=== OECD ===
Foreign Minister Mondino, hours after taking office, confirmed that Argentina had signed its accession to the Organisation for Economic Co-operation and Development (OECD). She did so at a conference at the Casa Rosada, together with Andrés Schaal (one of the organization's directors). The OECD's invitation for the country to join the bloc was formalized during 2022, after years of efforts. This occurred together with confirmation of the rejection of Argentina's accession to the BRICS, after having been invited in 2023, confirming Javier Milei's initial rejection during the electoral campaign, in what Mondino would later describe as a "practical decision".

On December 20, 2023, the foreign minister undertook a 36-hour tour of France, where 12 meetings were held with businesspeople, diplomats, and members of the Government of France, with the main goal of "advancing accession to the OECD, one of Javier Milei's objectives in his administration". The aim was to get Emmanuel Macron to become his European ally for the administration, when reaching diplomatic agreements and undertaking trade negotiations.

On November 11, 2025, Foreign Minister Pablo Quirno met with the OECD Secretary-General, Mathias Cormann, to deliver to him the Initial Memorandum of Accession of the Argentine Republic to the Organisation for Economic Co-operation and Development.

=== Mercosur ===
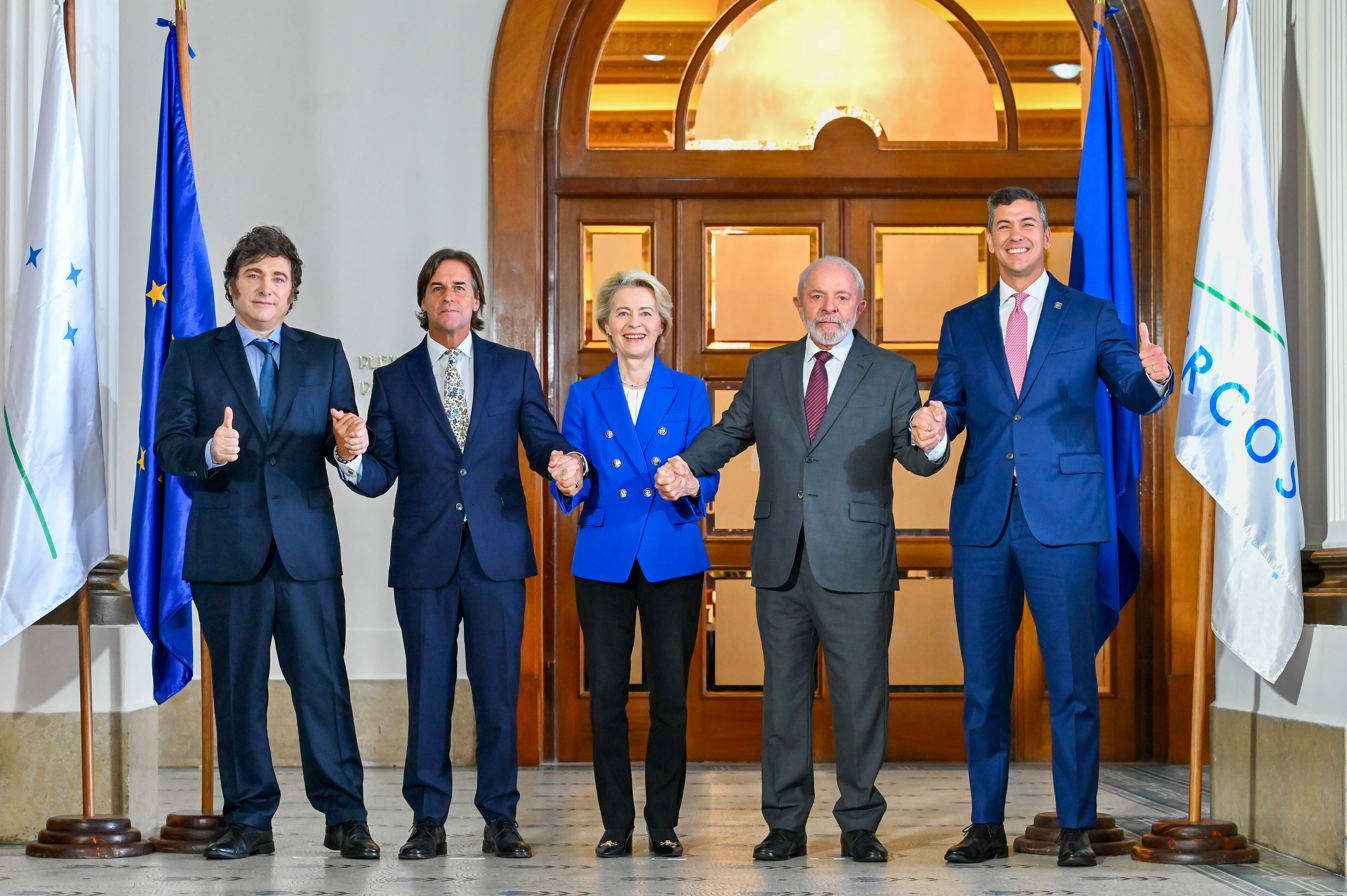
Milei with the presidents of the Mercosur countries and the president of the European Commission, Ursula von der Leyen, December 6, 2024.

During the electoral campaign, Milei stated that he was evaluating Argentina's withdrawal from Mercosur. Different sectors within La Libertad Avanza are skeptical about Argentina's membership in Mercosur. It was later rejected by the foreign minister, who said she sought to strengthen diplomatic ties, while noting that "Mercosur has grown old".

From the beginning of his administration, achieving the Mercosur–European Union free trade agreement was set as an objective, after decades of stagnation in the negotiations. On December 6, 2024, the same day on which he assumed the pro tempore presidency of the bloc, negotiations were concluded for the signing of the trade agreement with the European Union, after 25 years of negotiation.

On January 22, 2025, Milei stated that he would seek a free trade agreement with the United States and that, in this regard, he did not rule out leaving Mercosur. On September 16 of that year, Mercosur signed a free trade agreement with the countries of the European Free Trade Association.

=== NATO ===
On April 18, 2024, by Milei's order, Defense Minister Luis Petri traveled to Brussels, headquarters of the North Atlantic Treaty Organization (NATO), to present Argentina's letter of intent to become a global partner of the organization.

=== International trade ===
Initially, with the "Economic Emergency Measures", a temporary increase in the PAIS tax on imports and export duties on non-agricultural exports was carried out, along with the replacement of the SIRA import system by a statistical system, more flexible and free. It was later confirmed that it would be eliminated from January 2024 onward, freeing the entry of imports by no longer requiring prior authorization from the Central Bank. (Note: El Banco Central anunció que desde enero se liberarán las importaciones) However, with the implementation of the measures announced by Javier Milei on December 20, 2023, a total modification of the customs code and of the import and export system was carried out. With the objective of fully deregulating and encouraging the growth of international trade, a process of complete digitization will be carried out (to avoid paper-related problems), "the registry of importers and exporters will also be eliminated with a profound change in foreign purchases and sales" and "there should also be an effort to comply with the recommendations of the World Trade Organization (WTO) and the Organisation for Economic Co-operation and Development (OECD)". (Note: Tsunami de medidas: la letra chica del decreto “motosierra” que busca cambiar de raíz la economía argentina)

Finally, on December 26, 2023, the creation of the "Statistical Import System" (SEDI) was confirmed, as a replacement for SIRA, "with the objective of simplifying the processing of import operations". Its sole purpose would be "to provide statistical information in a descriptive and advance form to historical records", eliminating the obligation to process Automatic Import Licenses.

== Opposition demonstrations ==
On 18 December 2023, minister of Human Capital, Sandra Pettovello, announced the measures that her Ministry would take against piqueteros, accompanying the measures announced by the Ministry of Security on 14 December:

- "Demonstrating is a right, but so is freely circulating throughout Argentine territory to go to one's workplace". "Those who promote, instigate, organize or participate in blockades will lose all dialogue with the Ministry of Human Capital".
- "We will audit all organizations that distribute social plans, eliminating intermediaries".
- "To beneficiaries of social plans: know that no one can force you to attend a march under threat of taking away your plan. We will eliminate attendance certificates that social organizations use".
- "The only ones who will not receive the plan are those who attend the march and block the street: whoever blocks does not get paid".
- "We are working so that all citizens can regain work, autonomy and therefore freedom". "Beneficiaries of social plans can report to 134 if their plan is cut off for not attending a march".

Days after the announcement, the presidential spokesperson, Manuel Adorni, reported 8,900 complaints made to line 134, and also stated that the Polo Obrero, an organization that had served as an intermediary between the State and welfare beneficiaries, which according to the spokesperson "manages a fund of $5.461 billion extorting people". These measures were announced ahead of a march held on 20 December 2023, commemorating the events of the 19 and 20 December 2001, where various left-wing and trade union organizations, totaling 9,000 people according to official sources, marched against the economic measures announced by minister Luis Caputo and the anti-picketing protocol itself.

On 29 May, thousands of people took to the streets across Argentina to protest against the national decree seeking to deregulate disability services, which allowed patients to be treated by professionals regardless of their economic situation if they had a pension, PAMI, or private insurance.

At the end of May 2024, trains, as a form of protest, ran at 30 km/h and warned of a total strike. Journey cancellations were also recorded. Among their demands was a wage increase to recover purchasing power lost due to inflation.

Between May and June 2024, the "anti-Milei month" was held in various parts of Germany, organized by a platform of various Argentine and German organizations, such as the Assembly in Solidarity with Argentina (A.S.A.), which emerged in December 2023 in rejection of DNU 70-2023, and the Fair Trade Network, in addition to the South American diaspora, to "draw attention" to Milei's presence in Germany and in particular "to the links he has with the far right across Europe". The gathering took place in opposition to the Argentine president's policies, with the aim of preventing his meeting with German Chancellor Olaf Scholz. The program began on 25 May with a community event in Berlin. Activities included conferences, seminars and film screenings, and concluded on 22 June with protest demonstrations in the German city of Hamburg, coinciding with Milei's visit to receive a medal from the Hayek Society close to the far-right party Alternative for Germany.

Due to the visit of Javier and Karina Milei to France to attend the opening of the Olympic Games, members of the Assembly of Argentine Citizens in France and Argentinos en Lucha, "a group of Argentine migrants organized in solidarity with the Argentine struggle", put up posters on monuments and streets declaring the Argentine president "persona non grata".

=== Demonstration over the Ley Bases ===
On 12 June, political groups, trade unions and social organizations called for a demonstration outside Congress, along with cacerolazos in different parts of the country. Violent disturbances began around 1 p.m. in front of Congress against the Ley Bases, when the deployment of the "anti-picket" operation began. There were at least two hundred injured. A group of hooded activists, separate from those protesting peacefully, clashed with police by burning vehicles, including a car from Cadena 3, as well as setting fire to Buenos Aires city bicycles, throwing stones, Molotov cocktails and other objects at police officers, attempting to tear down protective barriers. None of them were detained. The affected Cadena 3 journalist, Orlando Morales, stated that those acts were "prepared" to be carried out if the Ley Bases was approved in the Senate.

Following what the government described as an attempted coup d'état, 33 people were arrested for terrorism who were located ten or more blocks from Congress, one of whom was detained with a hand grenade. Initially, Karina Milei ordered that none be released.

From 14 June, seventeen of the thirty-three detainees were released, and minutes before their release Milei said in a televised interview they were "criminals who all have to be imprisoned". Those released said their most basic rights were violated. They also stated they had spent more than thirty hours handcuffed, were unable to drink water and were mistreated by police.

On the 15th, the Center for Legal and Social Studies reported the national government to the United Nations and the Inter-American Commission on Human Rights for "restricting the right to protest" and initiating "a dangerous and arbitrary criminal escalation".

On 20 June, Servini ruled lack of merit for 28 of the 33 accused, who "had no items seized compatible with the act they are accused of (masks, slingshots, stones, sticks, etc.)", and in another ruling prosecuted with pretrial detention the other five, but not for attacking democracy as the prosecutor had sought. She also clarified that "some events are not known to the court", including the burning of the Cadena 3 vehicle.

On 4 July, the Buenos Aires Federal Chamber released 1 of the 5 detainees. The rest remained in pretrial detention due to possible "procedural risks". A week later, two more detainees were released.

Due to the government's actions, it had to appear before the United Nations Human Rights Commission and the Inter-American Commission on Human Rights. Both organizations expressed "concern about the disproportionate use of public force against people who participated in peaceful protests and against journalists in Argentina, as well as acts of violence committed by individuals" and were particularly concerned about "stigmatizing and criminalizing statements against demonstrators made by the Government through a press release from the Office of the President, in which people were broadly described as terrorists".

Strike over "the profound rejection of the Omnibus Law"

On 12 June from 00:00 hours, the Federation of Workers of the Oilseed Industrial Complex, Cotton Ginners and Related Industries declared an indefinite strike across the country in rejection of the Ley Bases, but it was ultimately called off. Two weeks later, the sector launched a total strike of indefinite duration in all plants nationwide "for including a regressive labor reform" and for being "more aggressive against the working class, with provisions that would seek to limit constitutional rights".

Protest by indigenous peoples against the Ley Bases and the RIGI

On 29 July, indigenous peoples began a protest in Jujuy against the Ley Bases and especially the RIGI (Regime for Incentives to Large Investments) for violating rights and exploiting natural resources.

=== Saint Cayetano march: Peace, bread, land, shelter and work ===
On 7 August 2024, on the occasion of the feast of Saint Cayetano, patron saint of administrative managers, the unemployed and of bread; during the pilgrimage to the saint and under the slogan "Peace, bread, land, shelter and work", various trade union forces, business groups, human rights organizations and groups from the ecclesiastical hierarchy marched. Among them were La Cámpora, the State Workers Association (ATE), the CGT, the CTA, the UTEP—most of them members of Unión por la Patria—the Christian Association of Business Leaders, "Priests for the Preferential Option for the Poor" and the Madres de Plaza de Mayo, in the presence of well-known political leaders linked to Peronism and Kirchnerism. Among them were Hugo Yasky and Eduardo "Wado" De Pedro, while other politicians gathered at the sanctuary, such as Gabriel Katopodis and Eduardo Valdés.

From the government side, Adorni commented on the march saying "We regret that on a religious date like this, where people attend in good faith and with the desire to move forward or to give thanks, it is led by political figures", adding that "Many of those figures are responsible for the economic disaster that this government inherited on 10 December".

== Approval ratings ==
Despite relatively high approval ratings during his early tenure, his ratings began to fall sharply in September 2024. A report from Torcuato di Tella University found that 55.2% of the population had a neutral to negative opinion of the administration.

October 2025 polls conducted by AtlasIntel indicated a 55.7% disapproval and 39.9% approval rating for the Milei presidency.

Pollster/Media outlet	Date	Sample	Javier Milei (President of Argentina)		
Pollster/Media outlet	Date	Sample	Approv.	Disapp.	DK/NA
AtlasIntel	20–24 Mar 2026	5,037	36.4	59	3
CB Global Data	10–15 Mar 2026	2,592	42.3	55.6	2.1
Proyección	1–9 Mar 2026	1,000	41.1	49.3	9.6
Tres Punto Zero	Mar 2026	1,300	37.2	59.8	3.0
Analogías	20–23 Feb 2026	2,691	38.2	48.7	–
Zuban Córdoba y Asociados	Dec 2025	1,200	48.5	51	0.5
Opina Argentina	1–3 Dec 2025	1,772	49	50	1
University of San Andrés	12–20 Nov 2025	1,005	45	52	3
CB Consultora	17–22 Oct 2025	1,164	45.9	26.6	–
Opina Argentina	12–14 Sep 2025	1,588	39	58	3
AtlasIntel	10–14 Sep 2025	5,315	42.4	53.7	3.8
ESPOP	11–21 Jul 2025	1,000	42	55	–
AtlasIntel	20–24 Apr 2025	1,681	41.8	47.5	10.7
AtlasIntel	20–24 Mar 2025	1,800	46.5	48.9	1.2
Zuban Córdoba y Asociados	Feb 2025	1,000	41.6	58.4	0.4
Analogías	Jan 2025	–	44	40	–
Management & Fit	10–21 Jan 2025	–	52.5	43.8	3.7
Opina Argentina	1–5 Dec 2024	–	53	46	1
CB Consultora Opinión Pública	Dec 2024	–	51.8	46.7	–
Sentímetro	14–21 Nov 2024	–	59	41	3
Altica	13–15 Nov 2024	1,200	54	46	0
AtlasIntel	10–15 Oct 2024	1,839	42.8	50.7	6.5
Opina Argentina	Oct 2024	–	43	42	15
Poliarquía	Oct 2024	–	52	45	–
University of San Andrés	13–20 Sep 2024	1,014	46	51	1
Tendencias	31 Aug 2024	6,874	53	47	–
CB Consultora	11–15 Jun 2024	1,325	55.7	41.9	2.4
Opina Argentina	3–5 Jun 2024	1,720	52	48	–
Delfos	May 2024	–	47	51	1
Opina Argentina	Apr 2024	–	49	50	2
AtlasIntel	19 Mar 2024	–	47.7	46.7	4.6
University of San Andrés	18–22 Mar 2024	1,045	54	47	–
University of San Andrés	9–16 Jan 2024	1,007	48	47	1

== $Libra cryptocurrency scandal ==
In February 2025, opposition politicians in Congress called for an impeachment trial of Milei after he promoted the $Libra cryptocurrency which then suffered a disastrous price drop shortly afterward. Commentators said it could have been a rug pull. The presidential office announced that the Anti-Corruption Office would open an investigation to determine if there was "improper conduct" by anyone, "including the president himself".
