= Argentine COVID-19 vaccination scandal =

Political scandal in Argentina

The Argentine COVID-19 vaccination scandal, known in Argentina as vacunatorio VIP ("VIP vaccination" or "VIP vaccination center" in English), is a political scandal related to the application of COVID-19 vaccines in the Ministry of Health of Argentina to citizens who, due to the limitations established in the vaccination protocol, were not authorized to receive these vaccines yet.

The scandal was first denounced by intellectual Beatriz Sarlo, who denounced that she was offered to be vaccinated "under the table," but refused to identify the people who did it. Faced with the complaint, Fernán Quirós, the Minister of Health of the Autonomous City of Buenos Aires, indicated that this did not happen in his jurisdiction.

The second disclosure was made by journalist Horacio Verbitsky, who said that he was vaccinated in the offices of the Ministry of Health, then led by Ginés González García. This led to the immediate request for González García to resign by the President of Argentina, Alberto Fernández. He was replaced by the then-Vice Minister, Carla Vizzotti. Vizzotti ordered the publication of the list of those vaccinated under the direction of the Ministry of Health, which amounted to seventy people, stating that the vast majority were strategic personnel, denying that a "VIP vaccination center" operated in the Ministry and reporting that it was "a very specific, exceptional, wrong situation and that the necessary measures have been taken."

The scandal occurred in the context of a shortage of vaccines, rumors of vaccination due to favoritism or political militancy, and the use of political party buildings for volunteers to register the population for vaccination.

Some media compared the event with the COVID-19 vaccine scandal that occurred in Peru, known as Vacunagate. Other media also compared it with the scandal in Chile, where it was found that 37,000 people, under 60 years old and without chronic diseases that do not belong to priority groups, were vaccinated before the time established in their vaccination schedule.

== Background ==
In Argentina, the Sputnik V COVID-19 vaccine was designated to be applied to the population considered essential or at risk, through a schedule and protocol established in the country's vaccination campaign against COVID-19.

During the previous weeks, cases of politicians, political activists and other people who were not within the groups allowed to receive the vaccine but who nonetheless received it were disclosed.

Alejandro Cellillo, Second Vice President of the Buenos Aires Senate, stated that 400 vaccines disappeared and appeared at the Olavarría Oncology Hospital and said that this was due to "ideological and not technical health issues".

Intellectual Beatriz Sarlo denounced that she was offered to be vaccinated "under the table," but refused to identify the people who offered it to her when asked, saying sarcastically that "they offered it to me from planet Mars".

== Events ==
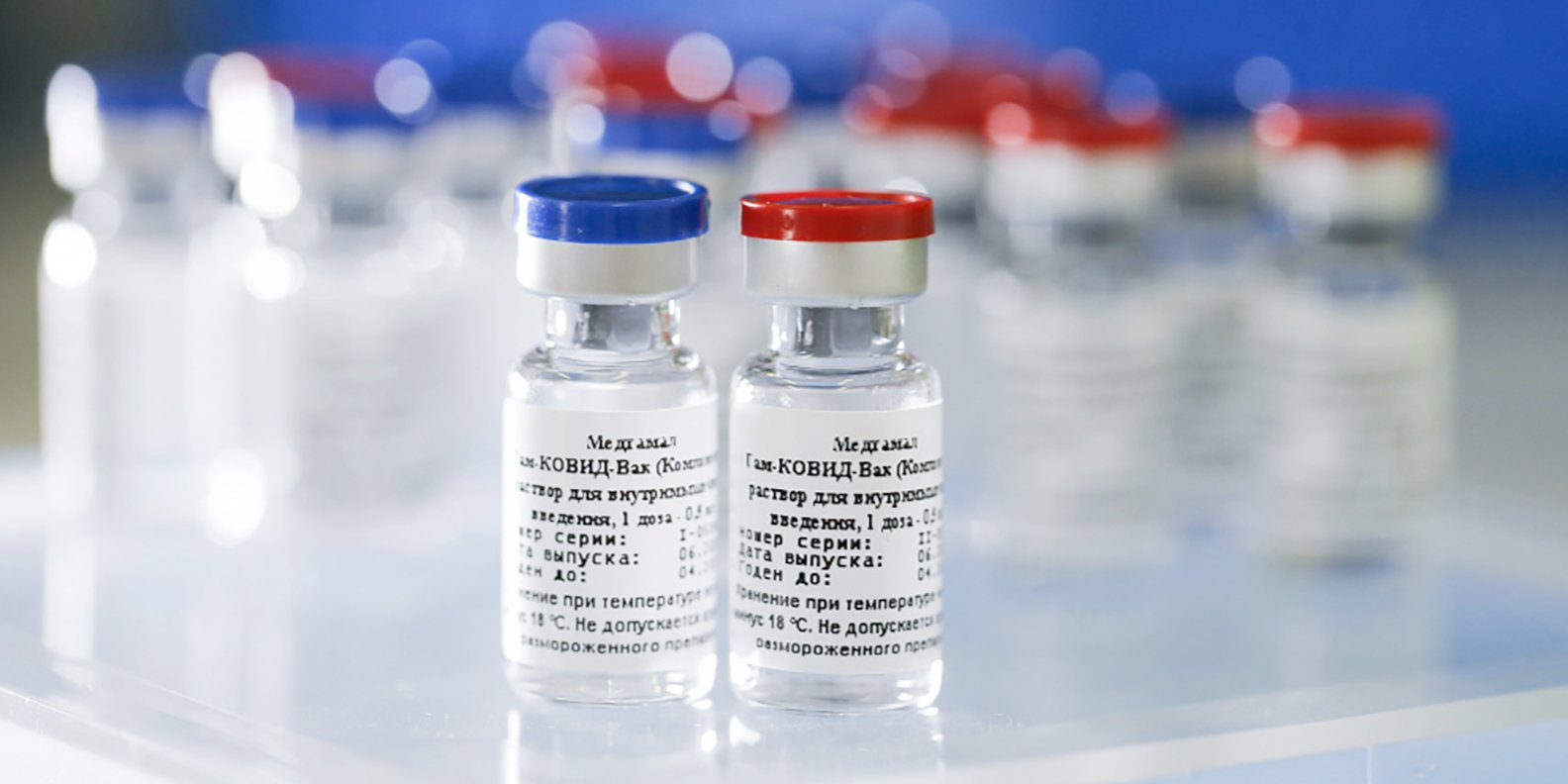
Russian Ministry of Health's image of Sputnik V COVID-19 vaccine vials

On 18 February 2021, reports began of an alleged secret operation to establish a vacunatorio VIP ("VIP vaccination center") in the building of the Ministry of Health.

On 19 February 2021, after versions of the alleged operation began to be released, journalist Horacio Verbitsky, one of those vaccinated, decided to comment on the event on a radio program, indicating that he was vaccinated at the headquarters of the Ministry of Health:

"Llamé a mi viejo amigo Ginés González García, a quien conozco de mucho antes que fuera ministro, y me dijo que tenía que ir al Hospital Posadas [...] cuando estaba por ir recibí un mensaje del secretario de Ginés, que me dijo que iba a venir un equipo de vacunadores del Posadas al Ministerio y que fuera a darme la vacuna."
("I called my old friend Ginés González García, whom I have known long before he was a minister, and he told me that I had to go to the Posadas Hospital [...] when I was about to go I received a message from Ginés's secretary, who told me that a team of vaccinators from Posadas would come to the Ministry and give me the vaccine.")

The report of the event in the media made it known other people who would have been vaccinated in violation of the limitations dictated by the protocol; among them are Jorge Taiana (senator), Eduardo Valdés (deputy), Florencio Aldrey Iglesias (businessman, owner of the newspaper La Capital of Mar del Plata and several hotels), Dolores Noya Aldrey (Aldrey's relative), Lourdes Noya Aldrey (Aldrey's relative), Dolores Noya Aldrey (Aldrey's relative), Salomón Schachter (traumatologist, professor emeritus of the University of Buenos Aires), and Seza Manukian (businessman), among others. The newspaper La Nación reported that Ginés González García reserved 3,000 doses to distribute among political figures, and that his nephew also received a dose.

The press also revealed that trade unionist Hugo Moyano, his wife and their youngest son had been vaccinated. Moyano later indicated that his case was not that of a "vaccinated VIP", maintaining that he received the vaccine (among the given to the health personnel by the government of the City of Buenos Aires) for being president of two social works, and his relatives for working in a sanatorium.

On 22 February, the government released a list of people who were vaccinated at the Posadas Hospital at the request of the Ministry of Health. In social media, some fake news about alleged lists of vaccinated, including the names of celebrities such as television hosts Alejandro Fantino, Marcelo Tinelli, and Ángel De Brito, actor Pablo Echarri and former President Mauricio Macri, were spread.

== Aftermath ==
=== Resignation of Ginés González García ===
Once the scandal was made public, President Alberto Fernández requested the resignation of Ginés González García. González García delivered a letter of resignation, alleging that there was an "involuntary error" from his private secretary. The resignation was accepted thanking "the resigning official for the valuable services rendered in the performance of his post," and he was replaced by Carla Vizzotti in February 20.

=== Legal complaints and investigation ===
After the scandal, fifteen complaints were filed in the federal court against Ginés González García, Carla Vizzotti, Alberto Fernández, Hugo Moyano, Horacio Verbitsky, Jorge Taiana and Eduardo Valdés, among others.

Federal prosecutor Guillermo Marijuan formally charged Ginés González García and Horacio Verbitsky for alleged "abuse of authority and non-compliance of a public official", stating that "they would constitute the crime provided for in article 248 of the Penal Code", and qualifying the deed as "an act of unusual institutional gravity".

The case fell to the court of María Eugenia Capuchetti and its investigation is in charge of the prosecutor Eduardo Taiano, who charged González García in principle with "abuse of authority." Likewise, Taiano considered that "it is an act of unusual institutional gravity because not only is it not complying with the duties of a public official, but it is also preventing a person considered to be at greater risk and who needs to be vaccinated from doing so".

On 22 February, police and judicial personnel carried out a raid at the headquarters of the Ministry of Health of the Nation, where documentation and images from the security cameras were seized to corroborate what was denounced and verify if there were more vaccinated.

=== Reaction of other politicians ===
Radical Civic Union (UCR) leader Alfredo Cornejo stated that "the ruling party has just destroyed the hope of the Argentines." The president of Republican Proposal (PRO), Patricia Bullrich, stated that "in Argentina there are two classes of people: citizens who pay taxes and with those their vaccines, and the friends of power, who go to the Ministry and get vaccinated".

In the Argentine Chamber of Deputies, a request was presented for interpellation to the Chief of the Cabinet of Ministers, Santiago Cafiero, for the VIP vaccination scandal.

Requests for reports were submitted, both to the national government and to that of the Province of Buenos Aires, by various legislators.

=== Responses of those involved ===
Eduardo Valdés said that "Ginés sent me to the Ministry of Health to get vaccinated," indicating that "We were summoned to a vaccination, there were four doctors, nothing illegal. Here it is not possible to get vaccinated illegally because everything is in writing, there is a record" and that "on Sunday nights the entourage leaves and it seems to me that it is the right thing to do for a person my age."

In a joint statement, Taiana and Valdés argued that "we never exercised a privilege" to access the vaccine and that their cases apply to the priority category of strategic personnel: "Any person who develops management and/or leadership functions and functions necessary strategies for the proper functioning of the state", as established by the strategic plan for vaccination against COVID-19 in Argentina.

=== Other ===
Journalist Roberto Navarro dismissed Verbitsky from his radio station El Destape, stating that "what he did is immoral". In turn, the Center for Legal and Social Studies (CELS), an organization of which Verbitsky is a member, also distanced itself from the situation and on its Twitter account showed its rejection, stating: "We received news that the president of our organization was vaccinated outside the established system, through a chain of favors and on a personal basis, while we were trying, like everyone else, to get an appointment for the elderly in our families".

President Alberto Fernández removed Senator Jorge Taiana and Deputy Eduardo Valdés, accused of having been vaccinated irregularly, from the delegation of an official trip to Mexico.

== Protests ==
On 27 February 2021, a protest was held, called by the opposition, and with the presence of figures such as the president of the PRO, Patricia Bullrich and former presidential candidate José Luis Espert. A large number of people protested in front of the Casa Rosada. There were also protests in other areas of the country, including Bariloche, Córdoba, Neuquén and in front of Quinta de Olivos. In this last place there were physical confrontations between opposition protesters and others with wearing emblems of the CGT.

A group of protesters, belonging to the group Jóvenes Republicanos ("Young Republicans"), the youth wing of the PRO, hung body bags on the gate of the government house, which according to them represent the people who would have died from COVID-19 because the vaccines that could have gone to them were applied to the people involved in the scandal. The bags had the legend "Estaba esperando la vacuna, pero se la aplicó..." ("[He/she/they] was waiting for the vaccine, but [instead] was applied to...") followed by the name of some of the people accused of being "VIP vaccinated", including: the president of Grandmothers of the Plaza de Mayo Estela de Carlotto, former president Eduardo Duhalde and his wife Hilda González de Duhalde, the in-laws of the president of the Chamber of Deputies Sergio Massa, and the ambassador to Brazil and former presidential candidate Daniel Scioli. However, some people interpreted the body bags to represent the people whose names were printed on them, wishing for their deaths, and condemned the form of protest. Among those who condemned it were president Alberto Fernández, alongside his Chief of Cabinet, the ministers of the Interior and Defense, and various human rights organizations. The president of Grandmothers of the Plaza de Mayo criticized Bullrich and indicated that the organization's lawyers would seek a way to "condemn from the law" the events. Former president Mauricio Macri supported the demonstration, without referring to the controversy over the body bags. Jóvenes Republicanos defended the installation, arguing that "they clearly represent the Argentines who died due to the irresponsible handling of the pandemic."

== See also ==
- Vacunagate
