= Roberto Navarro =

Roberto Navarro may refer to:

- Roberto Navarro (boxer)
- Roberto Navarro (journalist)

== See also ==
- Robert Navarro
