= María Fernanda Silva =

Argentine diplomat

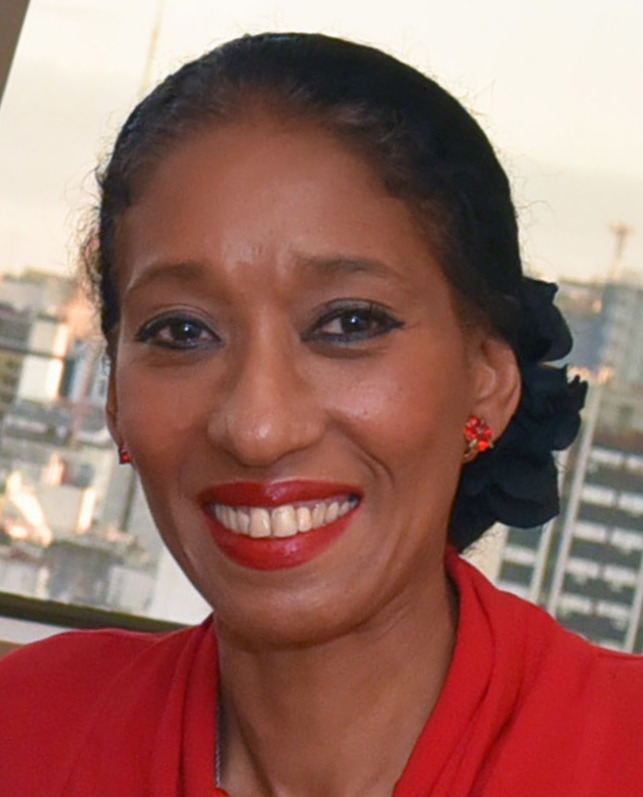

Ambassador of Argentina to the Holy See
- In office 23 May 2020 – 10 December 2023
- Preceded by: Rogelio Pfirter

Personal details
- Born: 20 December 1965 (age 60) Buenos Aires, Argentina
- Education: Catholic University of Argentina
- Profession: Diplomat

María Fernanda Silva (born 20 December 1965) is an Argentine career diplomat, and the former ambassador of Argentina to the Holy See. She is the first woman to hold the ambassadorship to the Holy See, as well as the first Afro-Argentine to lead an Argentine diplomatic mission.

== Early life and education ==
Silva was born on 20 December 1965 in Buenos Aires to an Argentine father and a Cape Verdean mother. From an early age, she was politically active in Afro-Argentine activist groups, and later in life she worked as an advisor to government agencies dealing with Afro-Argentine issues, as she considers Afro-Argentines to be an "invisibilized community".

She studied Political Science with a specialization in International Relations at the Pontifical Catholic University of Argentina. She then went on to study at and graduate from the Instituto del Servicio Exterior de la Nación (ISEN), Argentina's diplomatic service institute.

== Career ==
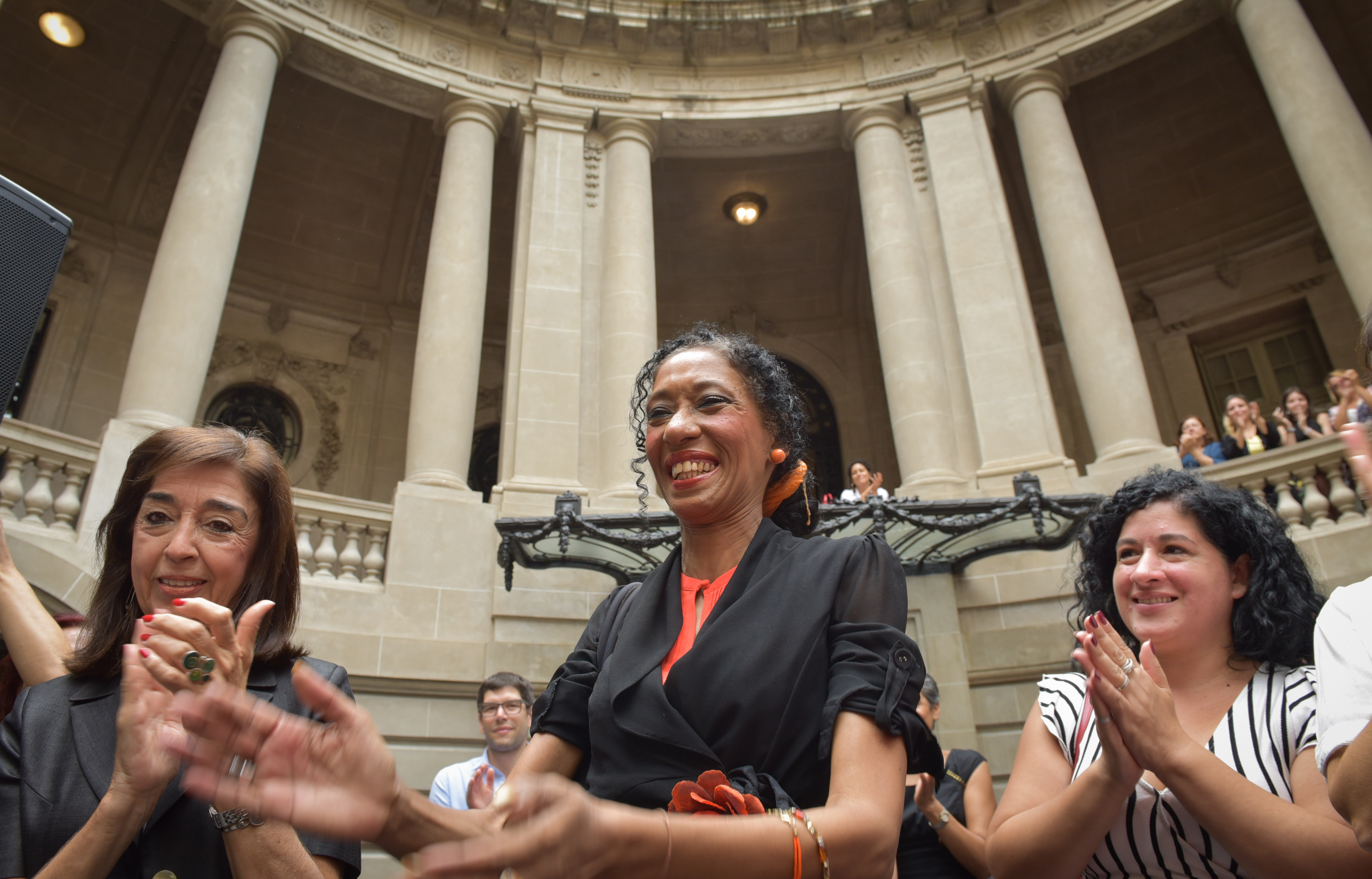
María Fernanda Silva in 2020.

Silva's first diplomatic post was in the Argentine delegation to Chile. She also served in the country's delegation to CEPAL. Upon the designation of Rafael Bielsa as Foreign Minister in 2003, Silva became part of Bielsa's advisor council. She was also first secretary in the Ministry's Directorate for Western Europe, as well as first secretary in the delegations to Venezuela under Alicia Castro and to the Holy See under Eduardo Valdés. She was also posted to the embassy in Ecuador, where she represented Argentina in UNASUR.

In 2016, Silva was appointed to represent Argentina before three international organizations based in Rome: the Food and Agriculture Organization, the International Fund for Agricultural Development, and the World Food Programme.

=== Ambassador to the Holy See ===
In 2019, the Argentine ambassador to the Holy See, Rogelio Pfirter, announced his resignation effective on 10 December 2019. As Pope Francis had, since the beginning of his papacy, requested for exclusively diplomatic ambassadorships from Argentina, the new administration of President Alberto Fernández set out to look for a competent candidate for the position.

In January 2020, Silva was touted as a potential ambassador. She had met Pope Francis when he was Archbishop of Buenos Aires; then-Cardinal Jorge Bergoglio had annulled Silva's marriage as her ex-husband decided to become a priest. Silva arrived to the Vatican and had her first meeting with Pope Francis in official capacity on 23 April 2020.
