= Eduardo Valdés =

Argentine politician (born 1956)

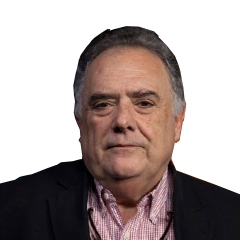

National Deputy
- Incumbent
- Assumed office 10 December 2019
- Constituency: City of Buenos Aires

Ambassador of Argentina to the Holy See
- In office 15 October 2014 – 10 December 2015
- Preceded by: Juan Pablo Cafiero
- Succeeded by: Rogelio Pfirter

Legislator of the City of Buenos Aires
- In office 7 August 2000 – 25 May 2003

Personal details
- Born: 16 February 1956 (age 70) Córdoba, Argentina
- Party: Justicialist Party
- Other political affiliations: Front for Victory (2015–2017); Frente de Todos (2019–present)
- Education: University of Buenos Aires

Eduardo Félix Valdés (born 16 February 1956) is an Argentine politician, currently serving as National Deputy elected in the Federal Capital. A member of the Justicialist Party, Valdés served as the Argentine ambassador to the Holy See during the presidency of Cristina Fernández de Kirchner.

In addition, Valdés also served as a member of the Mercosur Parliament from 2015 to 2019, as a member of the Buenos Aires City Legislature from 2000 to 2003, and as a member of the 1994 Constitutional Convention.

== Early and personal life ==
Eduardo Félix Valdés was born on 16 February 1956 in Córdoba, though he was raised in Neuquén. He went to school at the Colegio Don Bosco of Neuquén. Later on, he studied law at the University of Buenos Aires. Valdés has master's degrees in international relations from the Murcia and Georgetown University.

Valdés is married and has two sons. One of his sons, Juan Manuel, is active in politics and currently serves as a member of the Buenos Aires City Legislature.

Valdés is a devout Roman Catholic, and various sources describe him as being a friend to Pope Francis, whom Valdés met when Francis was Archbishop of Buenos Aires.

== Career ==
Valdés's political career began in 1989, as secretary general of the Buenos Aires City Government during the mayorship of Carlos Grosso. In 1991, Valdés was appointed city councillor. Later, in 1994, he was elected as one of the representatives of the Federal Capital in the Constitutional Convention tasked with rewriting the Constitution of Argentina.

In 1995, he founded the National School of Governance of the National Institute of Public Administration; he served as the school's director until 1998.

In 2000, Valdés was elected to the Buenos Aires City Legislature, where he presided the Justicialist Front parliamentary bloc. In 2003, he was appointed chief of staff of the Ministry of Foreign Affairs and Worship, during the administration of Rafael Bielsa. He stepped down from that post upon then-president Néstor Kirchner's request, following a diplomatic spat with Cuba over Hilda Molina, the mother of a Cuban-born Argentine resident who was denied the right to leave the island.

Following his resignation from the Foreign Ministry, Valdés turned to the private sector and worked as an independent lawyer. As an attorney, Valdés represented one of the victims of former priest Julio César Grassi.

=== Ambassador to the Holy See ===
In 2014, Valdés was appointed as Argentina's ambassador to the Holy See by President Cristina Fernández de Kirchner, replacing Juan Pablo Cafiero. He was granted agrément on 15 October 2014 and confirmed by the Argentine Senate days later. As ambassador, Valdés organized the five meetings held between Fernández de Kirchner and Pope Francis in 2015. He also organized the Pope's meetings with Diego Maradona and members of La Cámpora.

He resigned from the post in December 2015 to take office as member of the Mercosur Parliament. His last official act as ambassador was the inauguration of a new building for the Argentine embassy in the Vatican, near St. Peter's Square.

=== National Deputy ===
At the 2019 general election, Valdés was the 5th candidate in the Frente de Todos list to the Chamber of Deputies in the City of Buenos Aires. Despite not being elected, Valdés took office on 10 December 2019 in place of Fernando Solanas, who never took his seat and instead became Argentina's representative before UNESCO.

As a deputy, Valdés's position on the legalization of abortion was subject of much speculation by Argentine media ahead of the Chamber of Deputies vote on the Voluntary Interruption of Pregnancy Bill on 11 December 2020. Despite the bill counting with support from President Alberto Fernández, Valdés's faith and his closeness to the Vatican and to Pope Francis were highlighted as potential reasons for his opposition. In an open letter, Valdés was personally asked by his son, Juan Manuel, to vote in favor of the bill. In the end, Valdés voted against the bill, becoming one of the 32 deputies out of 119 in the Frente de Todos to vote against.

In 2021, Valdés caused controversy when it was revealed he had been vaccinated against COVID-19 under improper conditions, suggesting favoritism by then-Health Minister Ginés González García.

== Electoral history ==
Electoral history of Eduardo Valdés
Election	Office	List	#	District	Votes			Result	Ref.
Election	Office	List	#	District	Total	%	P.	Result	Ref.
2000	City Legislator	Open Politics for Social Integrity	3	City of Buenos Aires	118,795	6.36%	3rd (Note: Presented on an electoral list. The data shown represents the share of the vote the entire party/alliance received in that constituency.)	Elected	
2019	National Deputy	Frente de Todos	5	City of Buenos Aires	641,054	35.02%	2nd	Not elected (Note: Assumed office on 10 December 2019 in replacement of Fernando Solanas.)	
2023	National Deputy	Union for the Homeland	2	City of Buenos Aires	577,225	31.41%	2nd	Elected	
