= Rogelio Pfirter =

Argentine diplomat

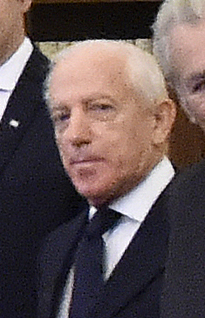

Ambassador of Argentina to the Holy See
- In office 23 December 2015 – 10 December 2019
- Preceded by: Eduardo Valdés
- Succeeded by: María Fernanda Silva

Director-General of the Organisation for the Prohibition of Chemical Weapons
- In office 25 July 2002 – 25 July 2010
- Preceded by: José Bustani
- Succeeded by: Ahmet Üzümcü

Ambassador of Argentina to the United Kingdom
- In office 1995–2000
- Preceded by: Mario Cámpora
- Succeeded by: Vicente Ernesto Berasategui

Personal details
- Born: 25 August 1948 (age 78) Santa Fe, Argentina
- Education: Universidad Nacional del Litoral
- Profession: Lawyer, diplomat

Rogelio Pfirter (born 25 August 1948) is an Argentine diplomat who served as Argentina's ambassador to the United Kingdom and to the Holy See. He was the Director General of the Organisation for the Prohibition of Chemical Weapons (OPCW) from 2002 to 2010.

== Early and personal life ==
Pfirter was born in Santa Fe, Santa Fe Province, on 25 August 1948. He graduated as a lawyer from the Universidad Nacional del Litoral. He is married to Isabel Serantes Braun.

== Professional career ==
During his diplomatic career, Pfirter held various positions at the Argentine Foreign Ministry. In 1992 he was promoted to the rank of Ambassador and in the same year he became the Director of the Argentine-Brazilian Agency for Accounting and Control of Nuclear Materials (ABACC) and the Director of the Argentine Space Agency (CONAE). He was subsequently appointed Undersecretary for Foreign Policy at the Argentine Foreign Ministry. From 1995 to 2000, during the presidency of Carlos Menem, Pfirter was Argentina's ambassador to the United Kingdom.

In 2002, Pfirter was unanimously elected the Director-General of the Organisation for the Prohibition of Chemical Weapons (OPCW) in The Hague, The Netherlands. He was elected for a second term in 2006. Pfirter's tenure was praised as a time of consolidation and strengthening of the OPCW after the controversial departure of his predecessor José Bustani. Pfirter gathered support for chemical weapons destruction and as a manager he succeeded in administering the Secretariat with zero nominal growth (ZNG) for four years in a row.

After retiring in 2010, he became a member of the Global Council on Weapons of Mass Destruction at the World Economic Forum.

From 2015 to 2019, Pfirter was Argentina's ambassador to the Holy See. Pfirter was appointed by President Mauricio Macri to succeed Eduardo Valdés, upon Pope Francis's suggestion. During Pfirter's ambassadorship, Macri and Pope Francis met on two occasions. Pfirter stepped down upon the election of Alberto Fernández as president in 2019; he was succeeded by María Fernanda Silva.

== Awards ==
Pfirter has received a number of international awards including Grand Cross of the Orden of Merit from Chile as well as Germany; Officier of the Legion of Honour from France and Commandeur of the Order of Orange-Nassau from the Netherlands.
