= Susana Viau =

Argentine journalist, writer and political columnist

- Born: 25 September 1944; Buenos Aires, Argentina
- Died: 24 March 2013 (aged 68)
- Education: University of Buenos Aires
- Occupations: Writer, journalist
- Spouse: Enrique Pacheco

Susana Viau (25 September 1944 – 24 March 2013) was an Argentine journalist, writer, and political columnist with extensive experience in graphic media in her country.

== Biography ==
Susana Viau studied literature at the University of Buenos Aires (UBA). She was a revolutionary militant in the 60s and 70s.

After the 1976 coup d'état, in 1977 she had to go into exile. After six months as a refugee with her family in Brazil, she lived in Madrid until 1988, when she returned to Argentina.

She maintained a friendship with political figures of various ideological extractions: with Union Peronist bloc deputy Felipe Solá, Radical Civic Union (UCR) deputy and presidential candidate Ricardo Alfonsín, and the national journalist and deputy Miguel Bonasso.

== Journalistic career ==
Viau began working in journalism in 1966 at the magazine Panorama. Then she went to Siete Días, Análisis, and Confirmado. She joined the newspaper El Mundo, linked to the Workers' Revolutionary Party, where she worked in the Correction section. Later she went to El Cronista Comercial, directed by Rafael Perrotta.

From Spain she wrote for Página/12, where she worked for 20 years as a writer. There she completed exemplary journalistic investigations, such as the one that put in check the private secretary of President Carlos Menem, Miguel Ángel Vicco, for his bargain by which the National Maternal and Child Plan received poor-quality milk for children without resources. She investigated Matilde Menéndez, record keeper of the public health insurance government agency Programa de Atención Médica Integral (PAMI), the parallel money table of the Banco Hipotecario, and the Menemista banker Raúl Moneta, about whom she published a book.

In 2008, she went on to the newspaper Crítica de la Argentina, where she devoted herself to political analysis as well as research and interviews.

In later years she worked as a reference political columnist at the Sunday edition of the newspaper Clarín.

=== Radio ===
On radio, from La Once Diez, she was a columnist for the program Estamos como queremos.

== Death ==
Susana Viau died as a consequence of the late recurrence of a lung cancer at the Alexander Fleming Oncological Institute in Buenos Aires at age 68.

Her husband Enrique Pacheco died on 31 December of the same year. The couple had two children, María and Enrique.

== Books ==
- 2001, El banquero. Raúl Moneta, un amigo del poder en la ruta del lavado, Planeta, Buenos Aires, ISBN 950-49-0815-2
- 2013, La reina de corazones. No es más que un naipe en la baraja, Editorial Sudamericana, Buenos Aires, ISBN 9789500744850
