= Matilde Menéndez =

Argentine psychiatrist

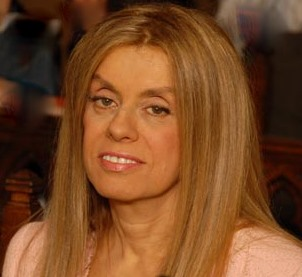

President of the PAMI Board of Directors
- In office 3 February 1992 – 15 April 1994
- President: Carlos Menem
- Succeeded by: Carlos Alderete

Governor of Tierra del Fuego
- In office 17 January 1991 – 10 January 1992
- Vice Governor: Miguel Ángel Castro
- Preceded by: Adrián Aquiles Fariña
- Succeeded by: José Arturo Estabillo (as provincial governor)

Secretary of Public Health of Argentina
- In office 8 July 1989 – 17 January 1991

Personal details
- Born: Matilde Svatetz de Menéndez; 1944 (age 81–82) Argentina
- Party: Justicialist Party
- Education: University of Buenos Aires
- Occupation: Psychiatrist
- Website: matildemenendez.com

Matilde Svatetz de Menéndez (born 1944) is an Argentine psychiatrist who acted as intervener of the Tierra del Fuego Province, Argentina from 17 January 1991 to 10 January 1992, and as Chairwoman of the Board of the Comprehensive Medical Attention Program (PAMI) from 3 February 1992 to 15 April 1994. She was linked to cases of corruption related to her term at PAMI, with all charges being dismissed in court.

== Biography ==
Matilde Menéndez received her medical degree from the Faculty of Medicine of the University of Buenos Aires (UBA) with a Diploma of Honor. After an active university militancy in Peronism, once qualified at the UBA's School of Public Health, in 1974 she was appointed Coordinator of the National Commission of Food Policy and Supply and Coordinator of the Nutrition Commission of the National Congress.

With the return of democracy, she would become Secretary of the Federal Health Council, Advisor to the Commission of Social Assistance and Public Health of the Chamber of Deputies, and of the Senate's Health Commission. In 1987 she created the "Por Venir" Foundation, dedicated to the prevention of drug addiction. In 1988, she was appointed Assistant Secretary of Social Medicine of Buenos Aires Province. In 1989 she became the first woman Secretary of Public Health of the Nation, and in 1991, the first female intervener of the Territory of Tierra del Fuego (now Tierra del Fuego Province). In 1992, she was called by President Carlos Menem to preside over the Board of Directors of the Comprehensive Medical Attention Program (PAMI). This directorate consisted of representatives of the General Confederation of Labor and retirees' organizations.

During her tenure at PAMI, a change was made in the benefit payment system, now based on a fixed number of monthly per capita payments to the providers. Also, the "PAMI Listens" system was generalized, with a 24-hour telephone line to receive queries, complaints, and suggestions from users.

At present, according to her own webpage, Menéndez is a teacher, researcher, adviser, and consultant to national and international private and state organizations, creator of programs, and founder of institutes dedicated to public health.

== Controversies ==
=== PAMI ===
After an incident in which providers were found (and filmed) in possession of envelopes with 25% of the value of the per capita payments received and presumably intended for PAMI officials for the payment of bribes, a series of denunciations were made that, together with a wide media treatment of the accusations, gave rise to a scandal journalistically known as the PAMI "returns". PAMI officials and leaders of were accused of charging monthly bribes (effusively called returns) to the providers who, by this means, made sure to continue to be part of the organization's payroll.

The President and her board amassed 32 criminal complaints for various crimes that were brought in cases before the Federal Courts of the Capital, with charges ranging from the alleged hiring of a personal hairdresser to the payment of surcharges on the purchase of pacemakers. Matilde Menéndez decided to resign, together with the entire board. PAMI was subsequently the subject of government intervention.

After five to nine years of investigation, with statements of hundreds of witnesses and reports, the 32 charges related to her term as President of PAMI were dismissed for lack of crime.

=== Prosecution withdrawn in AMIA case ===
Another legal case that involved Menéndez was her prosecution in 2003 for false testimony in the AMIA bombing case, accusing her of falsifying her statement about a telephone conversation with her lawyer Mariano Cúneo Libarona, in which they referred to a video that was presumably intended to extort Judge Juan José Galeano. Subsequently her prosecution would be withdrawn as no accusation could be brought in court.
