= Graciela Ocaña =

Argentine politician

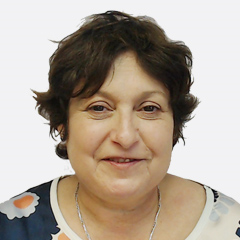

Legislator of the City of Buenos Aires
- Incumbent
- Assumed office 10 December 2023
- In office 10 December 2013 – 10 December 2017

National Deputy
- In office 10 December 2017 – 10 December 2023
- Constituency: Buenos Aires
- In office 10 December 2011 – 10 December 2013
- Constituency: Buenos Aires
- In office 10 December 1999 – 10 December 2003
- Constituency: Buenos Aires

Minister of Health
- In office 10 December 2007 – 29 June 2009
- President: Cristina Fernández de Kirchner
- Preceded by: Ginés González García
- Succeeded by: Juan Luis Manzur

Personal details
- Born: September 16, 1960 (age 66) San Justo, Buenos Aires, Argentina
- Party: FREPASO (Before 2001); ARI (2001–2003); Front for Victory (2004–2009); Union for Social Development (2011–2013); Public Trust (since 2013)
- Education: Universidad Argentina John F. Kennedy

Graciela Ocaña (born September 16, 1960) is an Argentine politician.

She has a degree in political science. In 2007 she was Minister of Health of Argentina in the government of Cristina Fernández de Kirchner and was a national deputy for four terms.

In 2017, Ocaña joined Cambiemos as a candidate for national deputy for Province of Buenos Aires. In 2021, she is a pre-candidate seeking her re-election.

== Life and times ==
Ocaña was born and raised in the western Buenos Aires suburb of San Justo in 1960. Raised without her father, she lost her mother to an accident at age five and was taken in by her maternal grandparents, both immigrants from Spain. Ocaña received her primary education at the Santa Rosa de Lima School, an institution maintained by Dominican nuns. She was transferred to the San Justo Secondary School system and enrolled at the University of Buenos Aires in 1978, where she graduated with a degree in political science in 1983.

Ocaña became affiliated with the Justicialist Party and found work in the private sector, managing a number of import-export businesses in the San Justo area.

Ocaña became disaffected from the Justicialist Party following President Carlos Menem's unexpected adoption of free market policies after taking office and, in 1993, she aligned herself with the eight congressmen who had left the party to form the center-left Frente Grande. An adviser to Buenos Aires Province Congressman "Chacho" Álvarez (the party's leader), she was elected to the Argentine Lower House of Congress as a member of the Frente Grande's successor, FrePaSo, on the Alliance ticket that brought Álvarez to the office of Vice President in 1999.

Ocaña earned renown for her work in the Money Laundering and Capital flight Subcommittee in Congress, where in 2001 she led investigations into businessman Emir Yoma and Córdoba Province Vice Governor Germán Kammerath, among others. President Fernando de la Rúa's resignation in December and the attendant crisis dissolved the Alliance, whereby Ocaña joined fellow Congresswoman Elisa Carrió's ARI, a new center-left christian democratic party.

Enjoying Carrió's esteem, she was invited to run on the ARI ticket for Governor of Buenos Aires Province, but declined, opting to stand for reelection as Congresswoman. Prominent in the Small Business Committee, in January 2004 President Néstor Kirchner appointed her Director of the National Integrated Medical Attention Plan (PAMI), a national health insurance program hitherto struggling under chronic mismanagement. Known for her differences with her boss at the time, Health Minister Ginés González García, over abortion rights and birth control (which she opposed), she maintained a low profile while earning plaudits for her active intervention in a number of large public hospitals, notably the Hospital Francés. Increasingly distanced from ARI leader Elisa Carrió, Ocaña formally resigned her seat in Congress in 2006.

Hoping to win a fraction of ARI voters over following their defeat in the October 2007 elections, President-elect Cristina Kirchner offered Ocaña the post of Health and Environment Minister, which the popular PAMI director accepted, taking office on December 10. Ocaña's decision to demand reimbursement for around US$60 million in PAMI services rendered to health plans administered by the CGT and other labor unions intensified CGT Secretary General Hugo Moyano's opposition to her tenure, helping result in her June 23, 2009, decision to resign her post. Her departure from the Health Ministry was not announced until after the mid-term elections on June 28, and Tucumán Province surgeon and Vice Governor Juan Luis Manzur was tapped to succeed her on July 1.

In 2014, Ocaña founded the anti-corruption political party Public Trust (Spanish: Confianza Pública). The party, which is currently a member of the opposition coalition Juntos por el Cambio (English: Together for Change), supported former president Mauricio Macri in the 2015 and 2019 elections.

In the 2023 local elections, she was once again elected to the Buenos Aires City Legislature.
