= Carlos Alderete =

Argentine politician (1933–2025)

Carlos Alderete (1933 – 25 October 2025) was an Argentine politician.

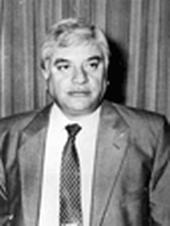
Carlos Alderete

== Life and career ==
Alderete was born in 1933. He served as the Minister of Labor in 1987, during the presidency of Raúl Alfonsín, and auditor of the Comprehensive Medical Care Program (PAMI) between 1994 and 1995.

In 2013 he was accused as a partner of the later president of the Supreme Court of Justice of Argentina, Ricardo Lorenzetti, of creating a PAMI provider in the city of Rafaela that would have monopolized the health care of retirees in that city.

Alderete died on 25 October 2025, at the age of 92.
