= Ministry of Public Works Building, Buenos Aires =

Public building in Buenos Aires, Argentina

Coordinates: 34°36′43″S 58°22′53″W

The Ministry of Public Works Building (Spanish: Edificio del Ministerio de Obras Públicas), now known as the Ministry of Health Building (Spanish: Edificio del Ministerio de Salud) is a public building in the rationalist style located on the intersection of 9 de Julio Avenue and Belgrano Avenue, in the neighborhood of Monserrat, in Buenos Aires, Argentina. It is currently used by the Argentine Ministry of Health.

On both the north and south walls, there are large steel portraits of María Eva Duarte de Perón, better known as Evita Perón. Her official state portrait faces the south while the image to the north depicts her giving a passionate speech. The installations were created by the Argentinian artist Alejandro Marmo (known mononymously as Marmo) in 2011.

Built from 1932 to 1935, the building was designed by Belgrano Alberto Blanco and originally housed the offices of the Ministry of Public Works, which gives it its first and most commonly used name. Its construction was originally suggested by the architect José Hortal to the then Minister of Public Works Manuel Alvarado. The building actually preceded the construction of the 9 de Julio Avenue as it is known today by several years.

In 1991, during the presidency of Carlos Saúl Menem, the Ministry of Public Works was dissolved and the building was made the new headquarters of the Ministry of Health and Social Action; the two portfolios were separated in later years, but the building still houses both ministries, while the newly restored Public Works ministry is headquartered in the Palace of the Treasury, facing Plaza de Mayo.

== Gallery ==
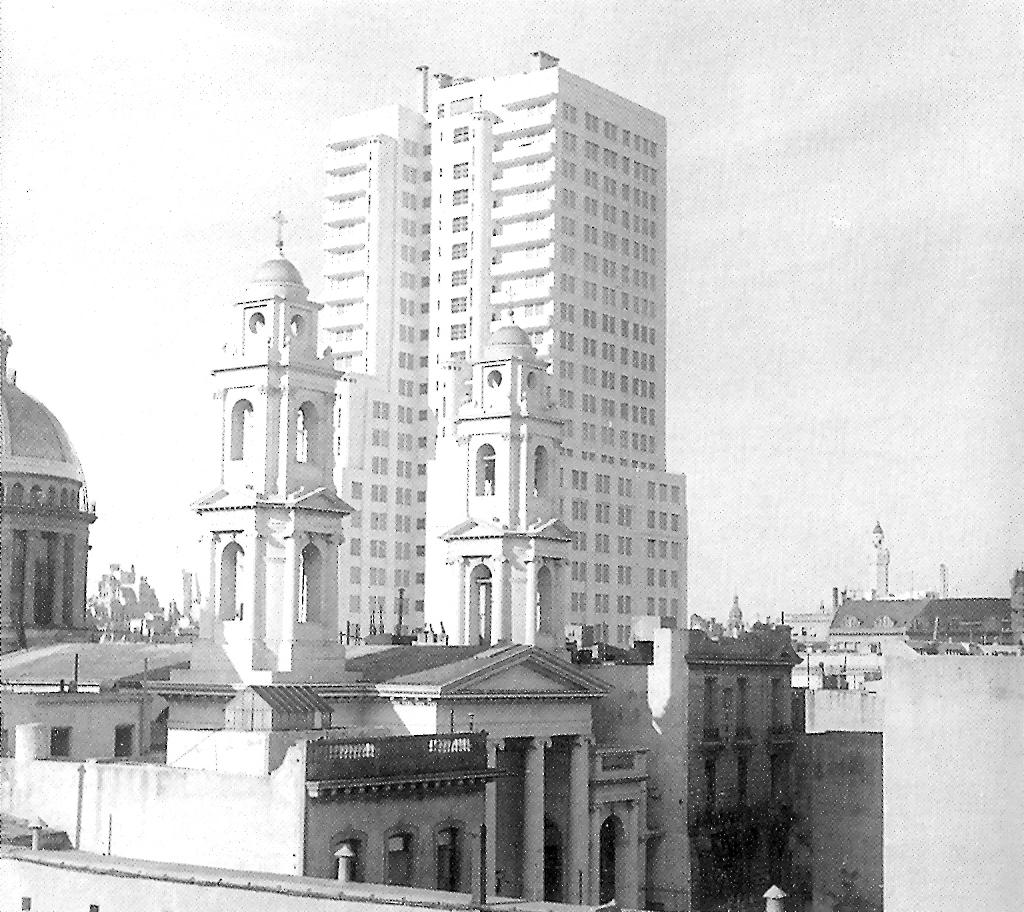
View from the west

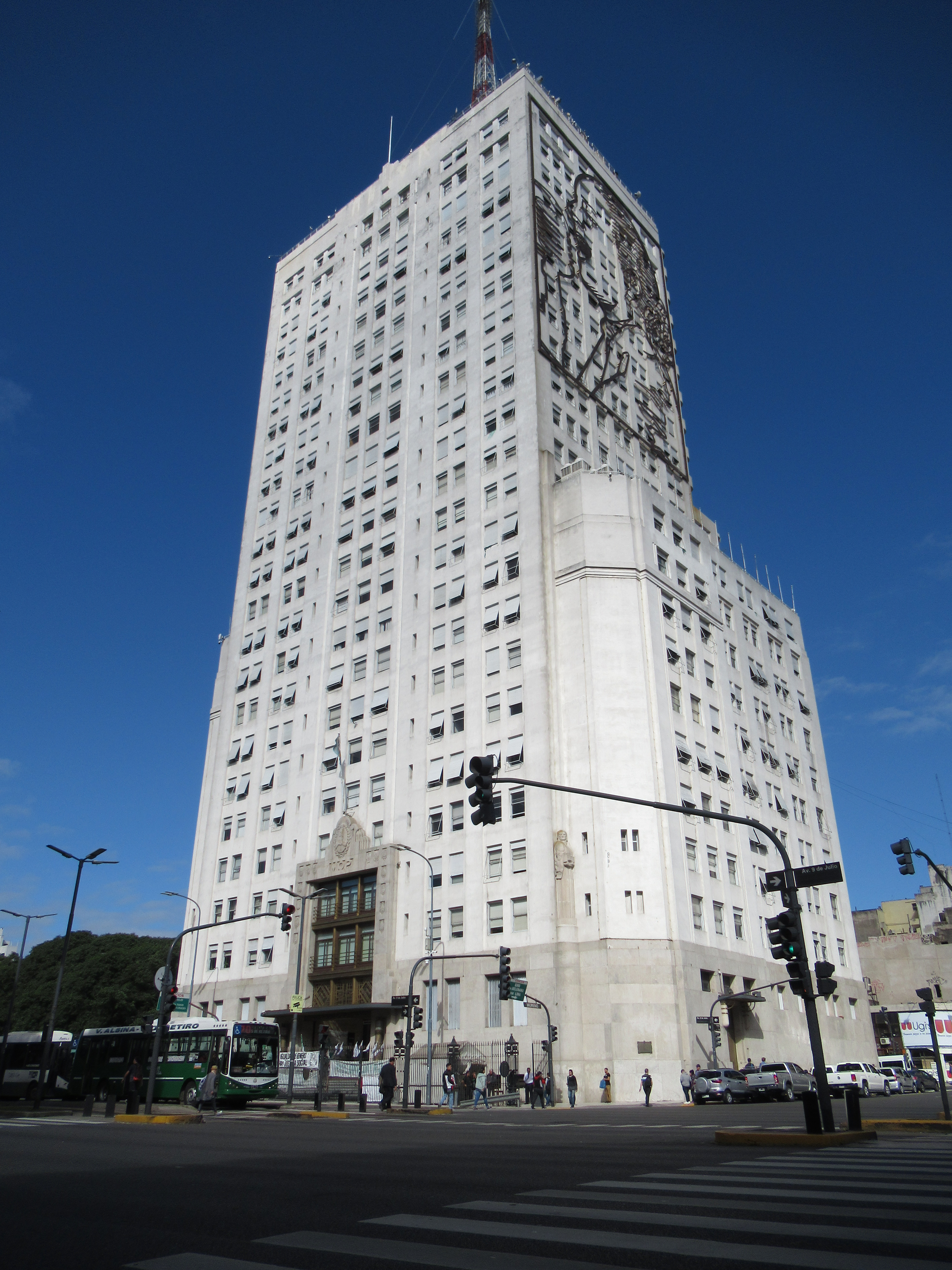
View in 2019

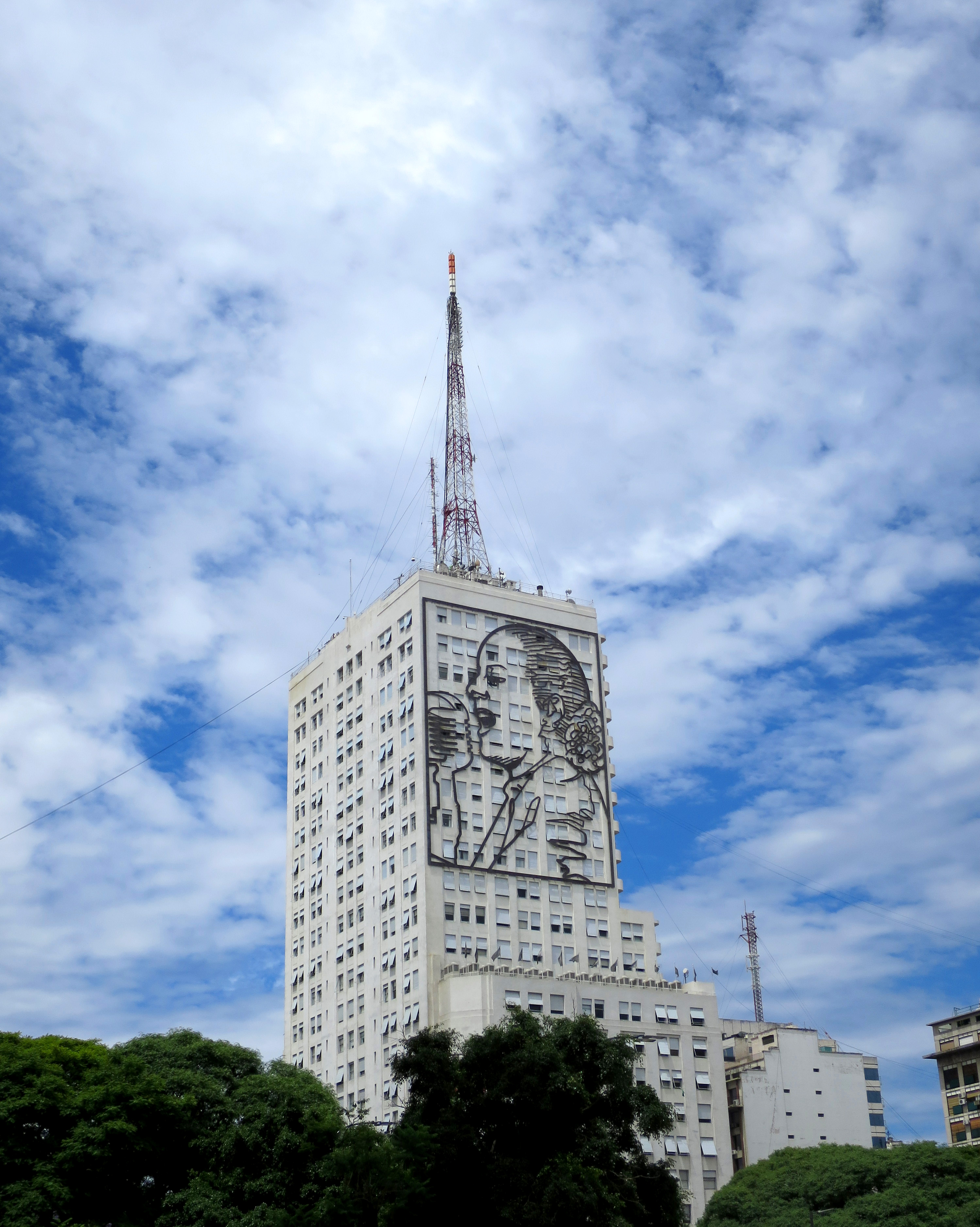
View in 2014

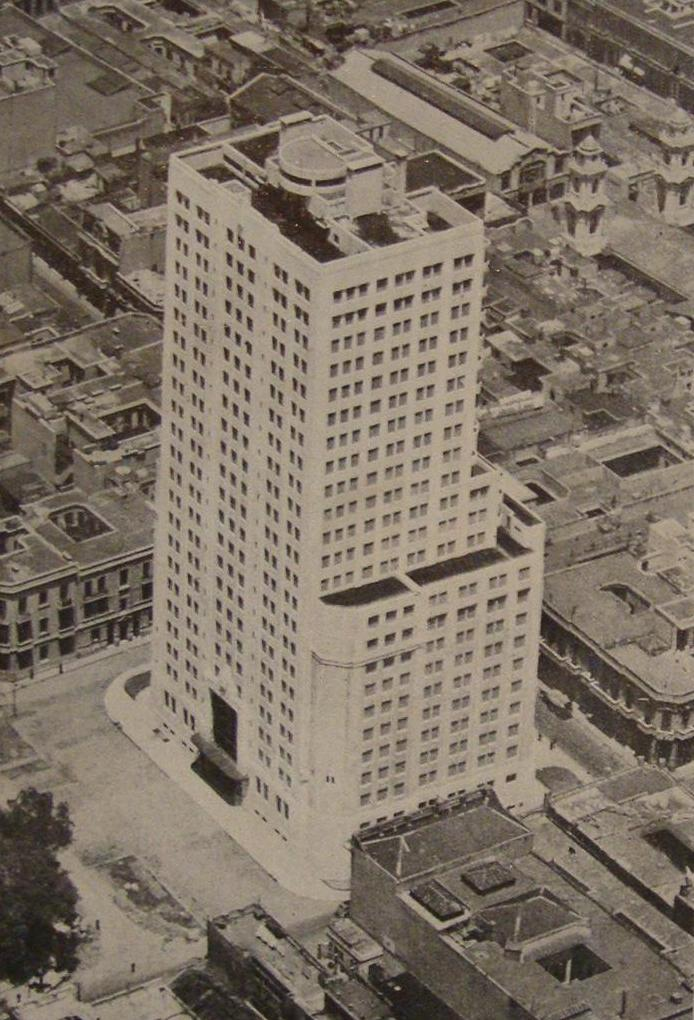
Aerial view c.1937
