= Carla Vizzotti =

Argentine public official

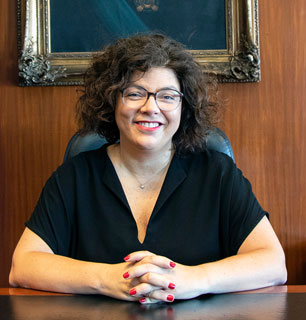

Minister of Health
- In office 20 February 2021 – 10 December 2023
- President: Alberto Fernández
- Preceded by: Ginés González García
- Succeeded by: Mario Russo

Secretary of Health Access
- In office 19 December 2019 – 20 February 2021
- Preceded by: New position
- Succeeded by: Sandra Tirado

Personal details
- Born: 1 April 1972 (age 54) Buenos Aires, Argentina
- Education: Universidad del Salvador
- Occupation: Physician, public official

Carla Vizzotti (Spanish pronunciation: [ˈkaɾla βiˈsoti]; born 1 June 1972) is an Argentine physician specialized in vaccine-preventable diseases. She was the Secretary of Health Access and Vice Minister of Health in Argentina's Health Ministry, working under Minister Ginés González García, until February 2021. She served as Minister of Health from 2021 to 2023, following González García's resignation.

== Early life and career ==
Vizzotti was born on 1 June 1972 in Buenos Aires, daughter of a gastroenterologist. She studied medicine at the Universidad del Salvador, graduating in 1997. She specialized in internal medicine at the University of Buenos Aires. She founded, and presides over, the Sociedad Argentina de Vacunología y Epidemiología ("Argentine Society of Vaccinology and Epidemiology"; SAVE), and has also worked at the Fundación Huésped, an NGO created to respond to HIV/AIDS.

From 2007 to 2016, during the successive administrations of President Cristina Fernández de Kirchner, she headed the Health Ministry's National Directorate for the Control of Vaccine-preventable Diseases (DINACEI). During her administration, she headed the National Immunization Plan and oversaw the extension of the existing immunization registry to include 19 free and mandatory vaccines.

== Political career ==
=== Secretary of Health Access ===
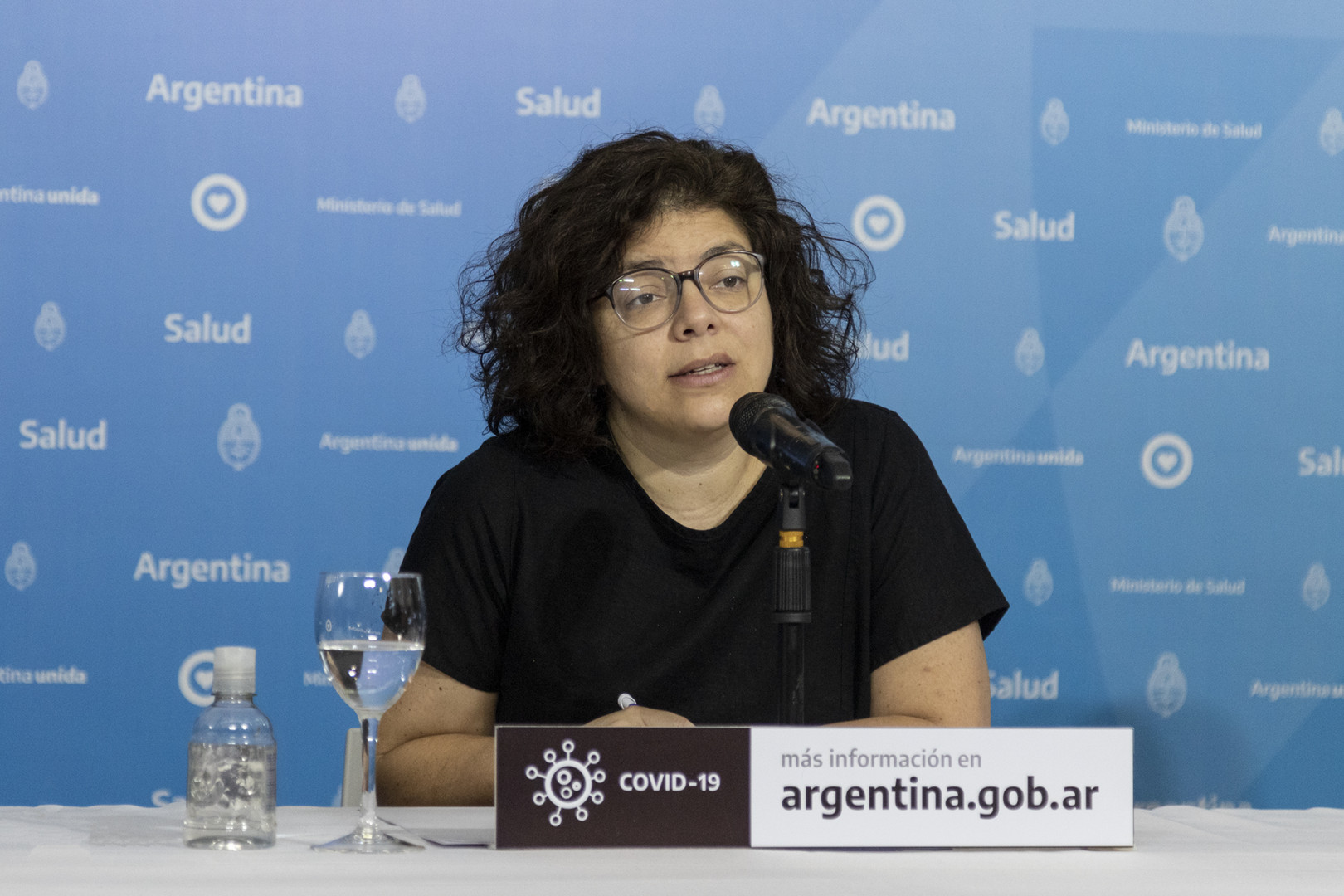
Vizzotti presenting the government's daily COVID-19 report in June 2020.

On 19 December 2019, Vizzotti was appointed to the newly established Secretariat of Health Access (Spanish: Secretaría de Acceso a la Salud) by Health Minister Ginés González García, as part of the administration of recently elected president Alberto Fernández.

In 2020 Vizzotti became one of the most visible public officials in the government's response to the COVID-19 pandemic. She has been tasked with giving the daily morning reports on COVID-19 statistics.

In December 2020, Vizzotti headed the Argentine delegation that travelled to Russia to oversee the transportation of 300 thousand Gam-COVID-Vac vaccines developed by the Gamaleya Research Institute of Epidemiology and Microbiology to Argentina.

=== Minister of Health ===
Ginés González García resigned from his position as Minister of Health on 19 February 2021, following journalist Horacio Verbitsky's confession that he and others had been favored by González García to receive the COVID-19 vaccine under preferential treatment, in a scandal known as the Vacunatorio VIP ("VIP vaccination room"). As Vice Minister of Health, Vizzotti was touted as the natural successor to González García.

Vizzotti was appointed to the position the following day, on 20 February 2021. Sandra Marcela Tirado was appointed Secretary of Health Access in Vizzotti's stead.

== Personal life ==
On 26 February 2021, she tested positive for COVID-19 and went into voluntary isolation. On 28 September 2021, she underwent surgery to treat a case of appendicitis.

Political offices
Preceded by Ginés González García	Minister of Health; 2021–2023	Succeeded by Mario Russo
