= Juan Pablo Cafiero =

Argentine politician

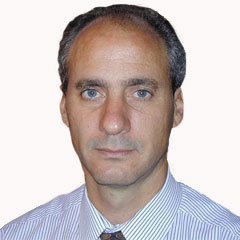

Ambassador of Argentina to the Holy See
- In office 5 December 2008 – 15 October 2014
- Preceded by: Alberto Iribarne
- Succeeded by: Eduardo Valdés

Minister of Social Development
- In office 1 March 2001 – 22 October 2001
- President: Fernando de la Rúa
- Preceded by: Marcos Makón
- Succeeded by: Daniel Sartor

National Deputy
- In office 10 December 1989 – 30 April 2001
- Constituency: Buenos Aires

Personal details
- Born: 9 July 1953 (age 72) San Isidro, Buenos Aires Province, Argentina
- Party: Justicialist Party (until 1990); Broad Front (since 1993)
- Other political affiliations: FREPASO (1994–2001); Alliance (1997–2001); Front for Victory (2003–2015)

Juan Pablo Cafiero (born 9 July 1953, San Isidro, Buenos Aires Province) is an Argentine politician and the Argentine Ambassador to the Vatican since 2008. He has served as a National Deputy and government minister, and is the son of Peronist Antonio Cafiero.

In his youth, Cafiero was an activist in the Peronist Youth and headed the Justicialist Party of San Isidro. In 1989 he was elected as a National Deputy for the Party, but the following year he was one of the 'Group of 8', progressive Peronists opposed to the neo-liberal policies of President Carlos Menem. The Group split from the Justicialist Party to create the Frente Grande and subsequently FrePaSo which formed part of the Alliance for Work, Justice and Education which took Fernando de la Rúa to the Presidency.

Cafiero had returned to Congress in 1997, representing FrePaSo. He was first Vice President of the Chamber. In 2001, he agreed to join the troubled government of De la Rúa as Minister for Social Development. When the Presidency collapsed, Cafiero was kept in his position by President Eduardo Duhalde.

In 2003, he was part of the movement which brought Néstor Kirchner to the Presidency, kirchnerism being much closer to Cafiero's progressive Peronism. He was appointed Minister of Justice and Security in the Buenos Aires Province under Governor Felipe Solá.

Cafiero was appointed as Ambassador to the Holy See in October 2008. President Cristina Fernández de Kirchner's first choice, Alberto Iribarne, was rejected by the Vatican as he had been divorced.

Cafiero is married with four children. He is one of ten children. A brother, Mario Cafiero, has also been a national deputy. His son, Santiago, has been Chief of the Cabinet of Ministers since 2019, in the cabinet of President Alberto Fernández.
