= Robert Navarro =

Robert Navarro may refer to:

- Robert Navarro (politician) (born 1952), French politician
- Robert Navarro (footballer) (born 2002), Spanish footballer

== See also- ==
- Roberto Navarro
