= Mario Russo =

Argentine cardiologist and civil servant (born 1967)

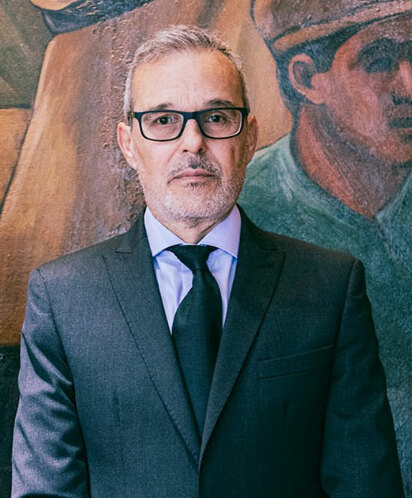
Mario Russo in 2023

Mario Antonio Russo (Spanish pronunciation: [ˈmaɾjo anˈtonjo ˈruso]; born April 1, 1967, in Catriel) is an Argentine cardiologist and civil servant. He was the Minister of Health in the Administration of Javier Milei from 10 December 2023 until his resignation in 27 September 2024.
