= Religion in the United Provinces of the Río de la Plata =

Religion in the United Provinces of the Río de la Plata (modern Argentina) saw great changes from the religious uses at the Viceroyalty of the Río de la Plata, in the wake of the great social upheavals that took place during the Argentine War of Independence. Although the war was not a religious war, and both patriots and royalists were equally Christian, it was influenced by the ideas of the Age of Enlightenment. The relation with the Holy See through Spain was cut, until being restored by Juan Manuel de Rosas.

== Colonial times ==
During the colonial times, the local clergy was concerned because religious people appointed from Spain were privileged over locals, regardless of their merits. Religious people were more literate and illustrated than the average people in the viceroyalty, and had easier access to restricted books, such as those of the Age of Enlightenment. Those books were not limited to theological ones. This illustration started during the reign of Charles III of Spain.

Most prelates supported the British invasions of the Río de la Plata. Friar Ignacio Grela promoted at the cathedral the strengthening of the British influence, as well as the bishop Benito Lué y Riega. On the contrary, they stayed silent after the liberation of the city by Santiago de Liniers. When Ferdinand VII of Spain was overthrown during the Peninsular War, they supported the Retroversion of the sovereignty to the people principle.

== May Revolution ==
Twenty-seven religious people attended the May 22 open cabildo to decide the fate of viceroy Cisneros. Benito Lue y Riega was a vocal opposer of his destitution, but seventeen of them voted for the end of his mandate and a military expedition to the other cities. At the end of it, the priest Manuel Alberti was appointed to the Primera Junta. Lue y Riega accepted the authority of the junta, but the Junta did not trust him completely, and prevented him from taking a trip across the cities in order to watch him in Buenos Aires. The distrust towards him extended to the supporters of the new government, generating incidents. As a result, he was prevented from making public appearances at his church.

The regular clergy took advantage of the revolution and the cut off relations with Spain, and requested promotions and benefices to the new government. People at lower ranks declared themselves patriots suffering injustices, in order to get government protection. The junta considered some cases, but eventually condemned the clergy that defied their religious authorities. Nevertheless, a violent night incident against Antonio Palavecino forced the military to intervene, and the junta started to monitor more carefully the activities inside convents.

== Bibliography ==
- Carbia, Rómulo (2005). La Revolución de Mayo y la iglesia. Argentina: Nueva Hispanidad. ISBN 987-1036-30-2.
