= PAMI =

Health insurance agency in Argentina

Comprehensive Medical Attention Program
- Programa de Atención Médica Integral

public health insurance overview
- Formed: 13 May 1971; 55 years ago
- Jurisdiction: Government of Argentina
- Headquarters: Perú 169; Buenos Aires
- Employees: 12,000 (2024)
- Annual budget: us$4 billion (2010)
- public health insurance executive: Esteban Leguízamo, Executive Director
- Parent public health insurance: Ministry of Health
- Website: pami.org.ar

The Comprehensive Medical Attention Program (Spanish: Programa de Atención Médica Integral, mostly known for its acronym PAMI) is a public health insurance government agency in Argentina managed by the country's Ministry of Health.

== History ==
Historically, health expenses in Argentina were met on an out-of-pocket basis, or through a number of mutual aid societies and health care co-operatives established by guilds, as well as by immigrant associations. Health care co-operatives developed into employer and trade union sponsored obras sociales beginning in 1910. They expanded rapidly during the administration of President Juan Perón from 1946 to 1955, when unionization was fostered. Health coverage for senior citizens remained sparse, however, and those who could retain their obra social generally received less adequate care than younger enrollees.

PAMI was thus established to absorb the growing number of seniors on the initiative of Social Welfare Minister Francisco Manrique, and was signed into law by President Alejandro Lanusse via Decree 19.032, on May 13, 1971. The insurer functioned only in Buenos Aires at its outset, though by 1976, it had opened offices in all the nation's provinces. PAMI established a network of affiliated general practitioners, and negotiated rates and prices with other obras sociales, health care federations such as the Argentine Medical Association, and with local governments. It also financed other needs affecting seniors, notably a mortgage loan program benefiting thousands whose homes were slated for demolition in 1978, during the construction of new freeways in Buenos Aires by Mayor Osvaldo Cacciatore.

The prolonged economic downturn of the 1980s affected the agency's finances, however. President Raúl Alfonsín placed PAMI under Federal intervention in March 1988, and appointed the former Governor of Buenos Aires, Dr. Alejandro Armendáriz, as head of the Crisis Management Commission. The agency's finances were stabilized by September, and the crisis commission was dissolved in favor of a panel presided by Argentina's two leading senior citizens' advocacy groups. PAMI was restored to solvency while adding spousal benefits and vacation subsidies for beneficiaries. Accordingly, Alfonsín signed Law 23.660 on January 5, 1989, which made affiliation in PAMI mandatory for all registered employees, and enacted a 6% payroll tax to that effect.

The agency's financial crisis was compounded by a series of administrative crises during the subsequent administration of President Carlos Menem. Menem's third appointee to the post, Matilde Menéndez, and most of her board of advisers would be indicted for fraud stemming from contracts signed during her 1992—94 tenure. The 1995 recession cut its revenues from US$3.1 billion to US$2.4 billion, and led to a US$1.2 billion debt. Alejandro Bramer Markovic was appointed in 1996 with a mandate to eliminate waste, fraud, and abuse at the insurer, only to resign the following year amid accusations of excessive spending on outside auditing services. His successor, Víctor Alderete, remained at the post until the end of Menem's presidency in 1999. His tenure, however, was marked by subcontractor cost overruns, and he faced over 20 charges to that related to these.

PAMI had entered a crisis stage. The agency's annual budget declined to US$900 million in 2003. Coverage, in addition, was managed through a system consisting of 72 intermediaries whose costs reached 50% of the agency's benefits spending, and the resulting deficits at PAMI prompted a reduction in prescription drug coverage to 40% by 2003. These developments led most retirees to opt out of the system, and membership declined from four million in 1992 to 900,000 by 2003, or fewer than one fourth of Argentine seniors.

The administrations of Presidents Néstor and Cristina Kirchner prioritized the agency in their budget policy, and from 2003 to 2010, budgets for PAMI increased from 2.6 billion pesos to 15.6 billion pesos, or 500%. Its related social assistance programs were expanded, and 800,000 seniors received nutritional, rent, and other assistance from PAMI. The agency's chronic deficits were reversed, and by 2010, it maintained a reserve fund of aroundUS$1.75 billion. Its enrollment also recovered, and services were provided to a total of 3.7 million patients in 2009, or 89% of the agency's members.

== Operation ==
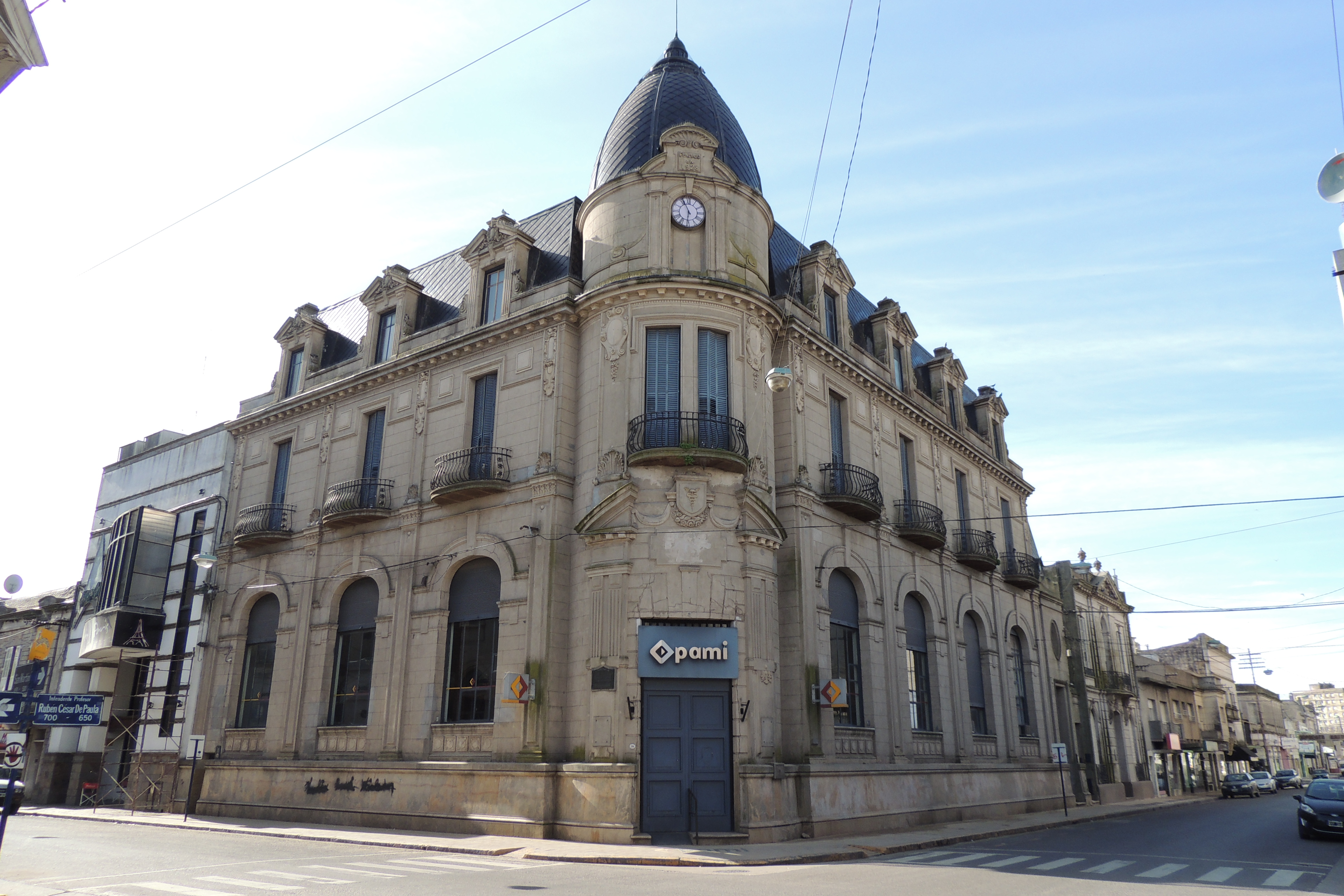
PAMI building in Azul, Buenos Aires Province

Administered under the aegis of the Instituto Nacional de Servicios Sociales para Jubilados y Pensionados (National Institute of Social Services for Retirees and Pensioners, or INSSJP), PAMI serves senior citizens, and veterans of the 1982 Falklands War.

PAMI maintains 37 regional offices and 550 local offices for its over 4 million enrollees. The agency provides free medicine to 650,000 pensioners and retirees, 87% of whom earn the minimum pension of around US$200 a month. Another 13% receive a benefit of the high cost of their treatment, in cases where this exceeds a retiree's income. The agency covers 100% of the cost of drugs to treat cancer, AIDS, and other chronic medical conditions. Medications for hypertension, which affects nearly nine of out of ten seniors in Argentina, are covered with an 80% discount, including prescription drugs for cholesterol and cardiovascular disease. The agency covers over 2,000 stent insertions annually, as well as over 6,000 pacemaker implants (70% of those provided in Argentina).

PAMI covers around 25 million doctor's visits and nearly 2 million prescriptions annually. Surgical procedures covered by the agency in 2009 included over 55,000 for cataracts, 50,000 intraocular lenses, 20,000 hip and knee surgeries, and 700 organ transplants. Other benefits include kinesiology, legal aid, mental health, and funeral expense assistance. Benefits represent 10% of the total pension payments issued by ANSES, the national social security agency. The real market value of the medical services, medicine, and other services provided by PAMI, however, amount to 30% of retirees' income. the total expenditure on drugs for PAMI in 2010 was almost us$750 million; were retirees to pay the market price of these drugs, their cost would have approximated us$3 billion. Private health insurance is widely available in Argentina. The cost of premiums for those over age 60 would be unaffordable to most retirees, however, as these average around us$150 per person per month.
