= Ginés González García =

Argentine politician and physician (1945–2024)

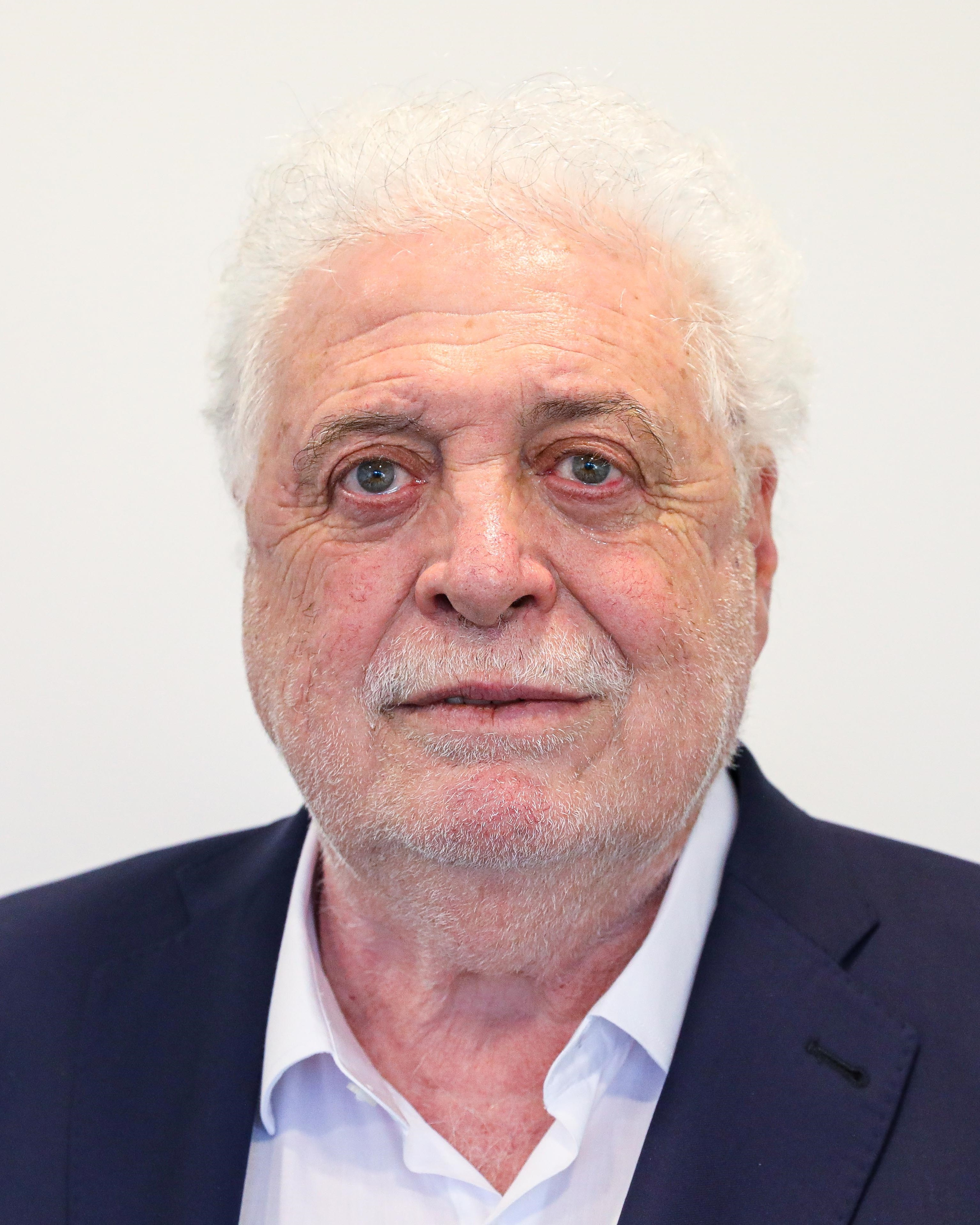
- González García in 2019

Minister of Health
- In office 10 December 2019 – 19 February 2021
- President: Alberto Fernández
- Preceded by: Adolfo Rubinstein (as Secretary of Health)
- Succeeded by: Carla Vizzotti
- In office 2 January 2002 – 11 December 2007
- President: Eduardo Duhalde; Néstor Kirchner
- Preceded by: Héctor Lombardo
- Succeeded by: Graciela Ocaña

Argentine Ambassador to Chile
- In office 24 December 2007 – 10 December 2015
- Preceded by: Carlos Enrique Abihaggle
- Succeeded by: José Octavio Bordón

Personal details
- Born: 31 August 1945 San Nicolás de los Arroyos, Buenos Aires Province, Argentina
- Died: 18 October 2024 (aged 79) Buenos Aires, Argentina
- Party: Justicialist Party
- Other political affiliations: Front for Victory (2003–2007); Frente de Todos (2019–2023)
- Education: National University of Córdoba

Ginés Mario González García (Spanish pronunciation: [xiˈnes ˈmaɾjo ɣonˈsales ɣaɾˈsia]; 31 August 1945 – 18 October 2024) was an Argentine politician and physician who served twice as the country's Minister of Health under the successive presidencies of Eduardo Duhalde and Néstor Kirchner, from 2002 to 2007, and under President Alberto Fernández, from 2019 to 2021. A specialist in public healthcare, González García also served as Argentine Ambassador to Chile from 2007 to 2015.

== Early career ==
González García was born in San Nicolás de los Arroyos, Buenos Aires Province on 31 August 1945. He graduated as a surgeon from the National University of Córdoba in 1968, and graduated in Public Health from the University of Buenos Aires, was certified as a Specialist in Public Health by the Medical Council of Cordoba, was recognised as a Sanitary Doctor by the Buenos Aires National Academy of Medicine and obtained a master's degree in Health and Social Security Systems at the National University of Lomas de Zamora.

Between 1970 and 1976, Ginés González was appointed health delegate in the provinces of Buenos Aires, Salta, La Rioja, Córdoba and San Luis. In 1976, González García had to resign as director general of the San Luis National Health System after the success of the coup d'état being forced into exile shortly afterwards to Spain, from where he returned in 1983 shortly before the restoration of democracy in the 1983 Argentine general election. Between 1983 and 1988, González García was advisor to the Commission of Public Health and Social Assistance of the Chamber of Deputies.

He was Minister of Health of Buenos Aires province during the government of Peronist Antonio Cafiero, between 1987 and 1991. In 1991 he founded the Fundación Isalud, and was its first president until 2002.

== Minister of Health ==
=== First term (2002–2007) ===
González García was appointed Argentina's Minister of Health by President Eduardo Duhalde on 2 January 2002. That year, González García formally promoted the Generic Medicines Law, which proposes to improve access to medicines, provide patient information, defend consumer rights and reconcile the doctor's right to prescribe with the patient's right to choose and be informed, and prevent the formation of monopolies. He also forged good relations with the guilds. When Néstor Kirchner was elected president in 2003, he kept him in his cabinet during his whole presidency as Minister of Health.

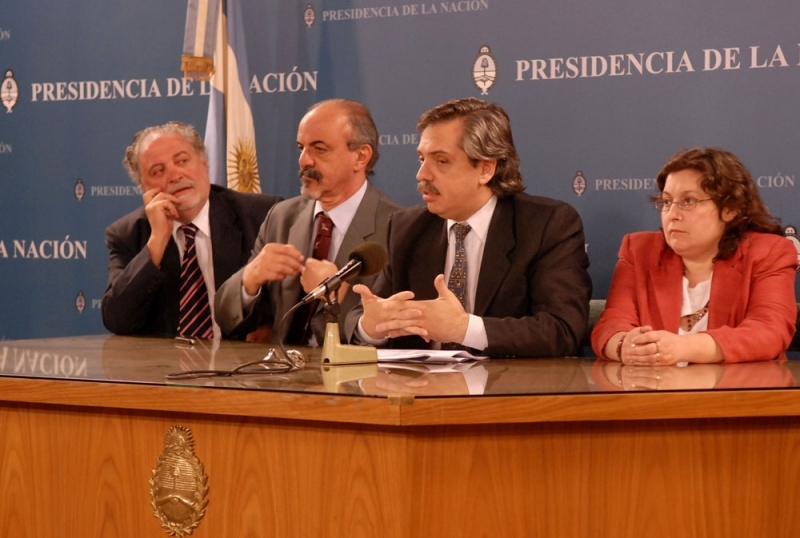
González García (far left) at a press conference with the Chief of the Cabinet of Ministers Alberto Fernández, 17 November 2006

In 2005, he incorporated the hepatitis A vaccine into the National Calendar, which led to a 95% reduction in cases of the disease and liver transplants due to fulminant infection in six years. Other measures he promoted were campaigns to reduce smoking and prevent sexually transmitted infections and unwanted pregnancies through the provision of free condoms. According to official figures, he also managed to reduce infant mortality from 16.5 to 13.3 per 1000 live births.

From 2005 to 2006 he was President of the Executive Committee of the Pan American Health Organization. Days before the end of his term, he approved the distribution of the Technical Guide for the Comprehensive Care of Non-Punishable Abortions to the country's hospitals. As Cristina Fernández de Kirchner assumed power, González García was replaced by Graciela Ocaña in December 2007, who denounced serious irregularities in the national medicine delivery programmes and in agencies that depend on the health portfolio.

=== Second term (2019–2021) ===
Alberto Fernández was elected president in 2019, and turned the health department back into a ministry. He requested González García to be minister of health once again.

Although abortion in Argentina was not legal in Argentina in 2019 except for limited cases, González García issued a health protocol that eased abortions. It allowed abortions in cases of pregnancies caused by rape, without requiring the rape to be reported to the police. In addition, the protocol provides that girls as young as 13 years of age can have abortions in such cases without the consent of either of their parents. The protocol also weakens a doctor's ability to refuse to perform such abortions due to conscientious objection as well. Abortion was legalized in Argentina a year later.

==== COVID-19 pandemic in Argentina ====
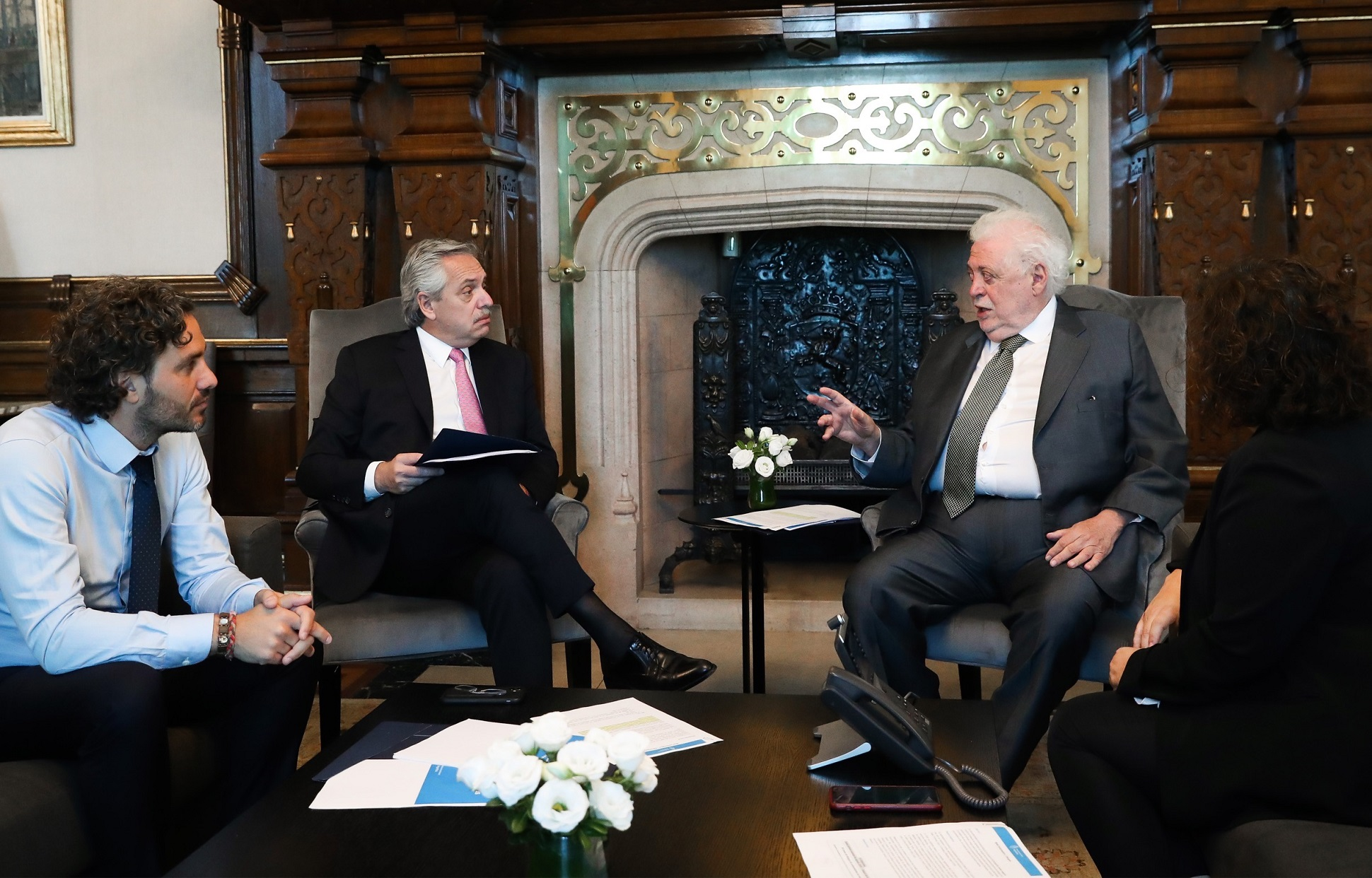
González García with President Fernández and Santiago Cafiero at a meeting on the status of COVID-19 at Casa Rosada, 28 January 2020

Shortly after taking office, the COVID-19 pandemic began. Initially, González García dismissed its significance, and said that he was more worried about dengue. On 28 January 2020 he stated that the risk to Argentina was remote and that the health system at the border had been put on high alert. In March 2020 he said that he did not expect the COVID-19 to reach the country so quickly. On 3 March 2020 he confirmed the first case of COVID-19 in Argentina. A few days later, in view of the new recommendations of the World Health Organization (WHO), the government declared the suspension of classes in kindergartens, primary and secondary schools and the closure of national borders. On 19 March, the government decreed a total and compulsory quarantine until 31 March.

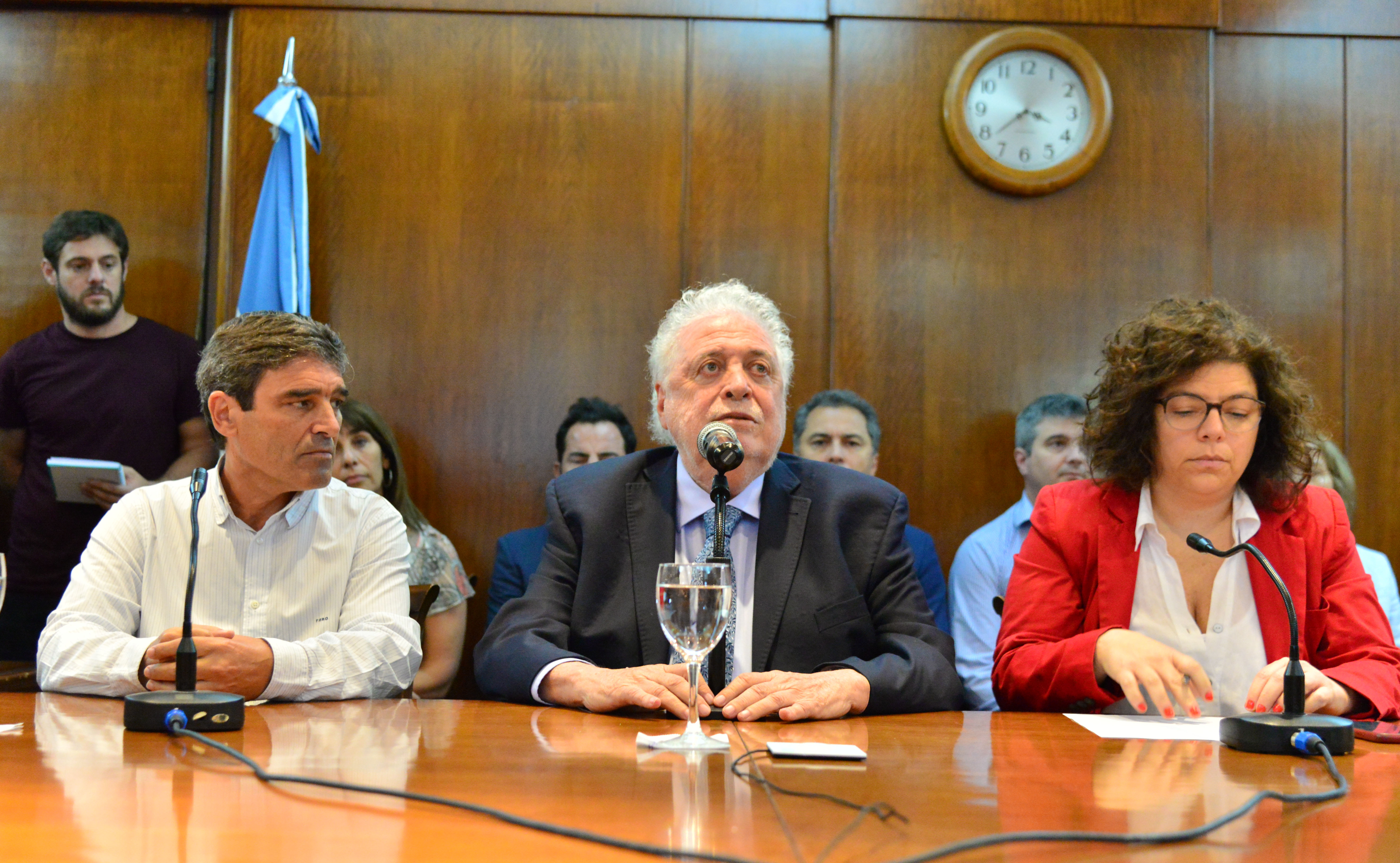
González García announcing the first case of COVID-19 in the country, 3 March 2020

Ginés González García was forced to resign as Health Minister on 19 February 2021 after it was revealed that he provided preferential treatment for the COVID-19 vaccine to his close friends, including journalist Horacio Verbitsky and other political figures. He was succeeded by the second-in-charge Carla Vizzotti. The revelation was met with wide national condemnation, from supporters and opposition, as Argentina had at the time received only 1.5 million doses of vaccine for its population of over 40 million. By the time González García left office, the pandemic had caused over 2 million infections and 51,122 deaths.

On 17 October 2024, one day prior his death, the Federal Criminal Court of Buenos Aires upheld the indictment of González García for the crimes of abuse of authority and embezzlement.

== Ambassador to Chile (2007–2015) ==
González García was appointed Argentine Ambassador to Chile by president Cristina Fernández de Kirchner on 24 December 2007. He was in office until 12 December 2015, during the entirety of both terms of Fernández de Kirchner. He was succeeded by José Octavio Bordón.

== Death ==
González García had cancer, and was under treatment at the Centro Quirúrgico Callao. He died in Buenos Aires on 18 October 2024, at the age of 79.

== Honors and awards ==
- Konex Award, Diploma of Merit in the discipline of Public Health (2013)
- Honoris causa from the National University of Córdoba (2019)
- Honoris causa from the University of Buenos Aires (2019)
- Honoris causa from the University of Morón (2019)
