= Roberto Navarro (journalist) =

Argentine journalist

Roberto Daniel Navarro is an Argentine journalist specialized at economy.

Roberto Navarro was born in Tigre Partido, Buenos Aires Province. He started with a small TV program, named "El Destape" in Argentine TV cable news channel CN23. He currently works at Argentine cable TV news channel C5N and is the director of digital news website ElDestapeWeb.com. According to the newspaper La Nación, Navarro is the journalist who personally received the largest number of official guidelines for the period 2009-2015: 14.75 million pesos.

Up until Mauricio Macri's victory in the presidential elections, he promoted government propaganda.

He announced, during the broadcast of the 2015 presidential elections, that Daniel Scioli had won by a wide margin and become the president of Argentina without a second round, and that Aníbal Fernández had been elected governor of the Buenos Aires Province. The announcement was made at 5:58 p.m., two minutes before the polling places nationwide closed and started counting the votes. As it turned out, Scioli had just a 2.9% lead over Macri, which led to a second round, and Aníbal Fernández lost to María Eugenia Vidal.
