= Argentina–Holy See relations =

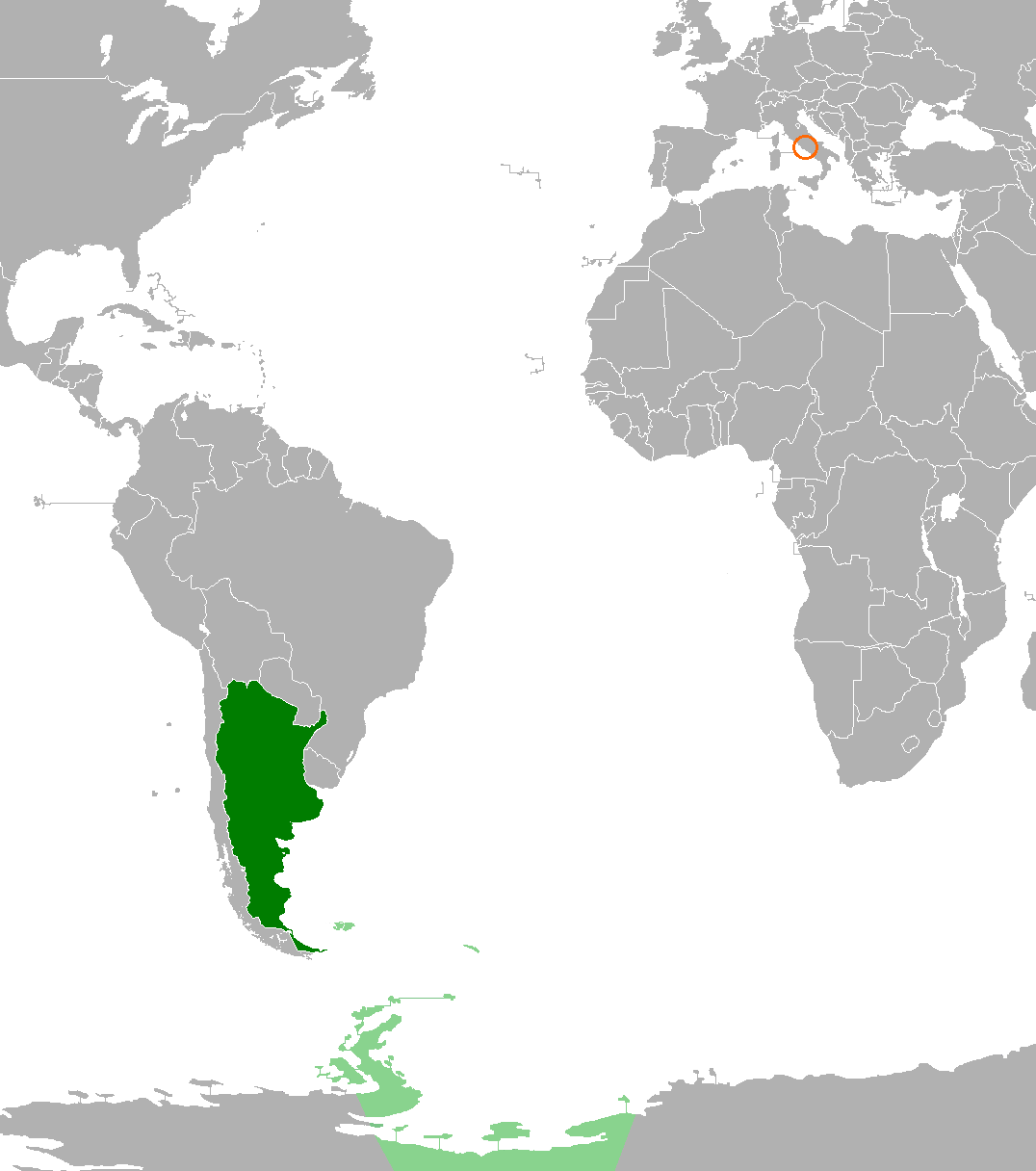
- Argentina: Holy See

Foreign relations between Argentina and the Holy See, have existed for over a century. The former pope, Pope Francis, was the former Archbishop of Buenos Aires.

== History ==
Argentina, which was a Spanish colony as part of the Viceroyalty of the Río de la Plata, lost its relation with the Holy See during the Argentine War of Independence. Both countries reestablished diplomatic relations on 17 April 1840, during the administration of Juan Manuel de Rosas. Argentina has an embassy to the Holy See, and the Holy See has an embassy in Buenos Aires.

Pope John Paul II made two pastoral visits. The first was in June 1982 where he called for an end to the Falklands War. The second was in April 1987 where he lectured on morality.

Vatican officials, including Pope John Paul II and Vatican Secretary of State Cardinal Agostino Casaroli acted as mediators to help resolve Argentina's dispute with Chile over the Beagle Channel. After the two countries almost went to war over the area in 1978, John Paul II became interested in resolving the dispute, which led to discussions between Chile and Argentina being mediated by the Vatican, and Argentine Foreign Minister Dante Caputo and Chilean Foreign Minister Jaime Del Valle issuing a joint statement of peace and friendship with the intent of developing a final treaty to resolve sovereignty in the channel.

In early 2008, Argentine President Cristina Fernández de Kirchner appointed Alberto Iribarne to be Argentina's ambassador to the Holy See. The Vatican refused to accept him as an ambassador because he was divorced. After ten months of poor relations between the two countries, during which Argentina refused to appoint a new candidate and the Vatican refused to accept Iribarne, Argentina conceded and appointed Juan Pablo Cafiero to the post, which the Vatican quickly ratified. In March 2013, Jorge Mario Bergoglio, then-Archbishop of Buenos Aires was elected Pope and took the Papal name as Pope Francis, becoming the first Pope from Argentina, the first Pope to come from the Americas, first Pope from South America and the first from the Southern Hemisphere.

In May 2021, Argentine President Alberto Fernández paid a visit to the Holy See and met with Pope Francis. In February 2024, President Javier Milei paid a visit to the Vatican.

In April 2025, Argentine President Javier Milei attended the funeral for Pope Francis at the Vatican. In November 2026, Pope Leo XIV paid a visit to Argentina.

== High-level visits ==
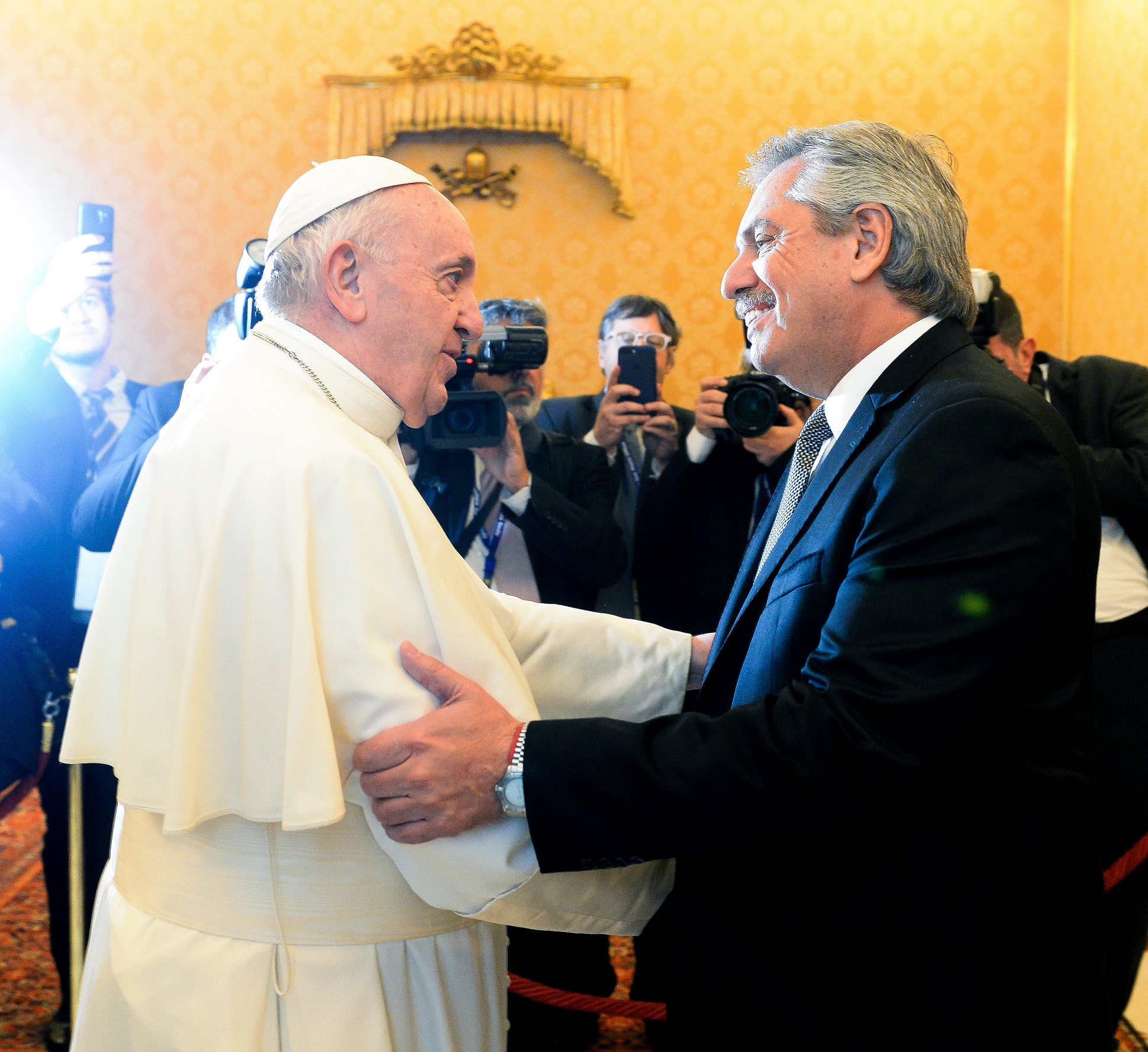
Pope Francis and President Alberto Fernández at the Vatican; January 2020.

Presidential visits from Argentina to the Holy See

- President Arturo Frondizi (1960)
- President Juan Perón (1973)
- President Raúl Alfonsín (1987)
- President Carlos Menem (1993, 1999)
- President Fernando de la Rúa (2001)
- President Néstor Kirchner (2005)
- President Cristina Fernández de Kirchner (2009, 2013, 2014, 2015)
- President Mauricio Macri (2016, 2018)
- President Alberto Fernández (2020, 2021)
- President Javier Milei (2024, 2025)

Papal visits from the Holy See to Argentina

- Pope John Paul II (1982, 1987)
- Pope Leo XIV (2026)

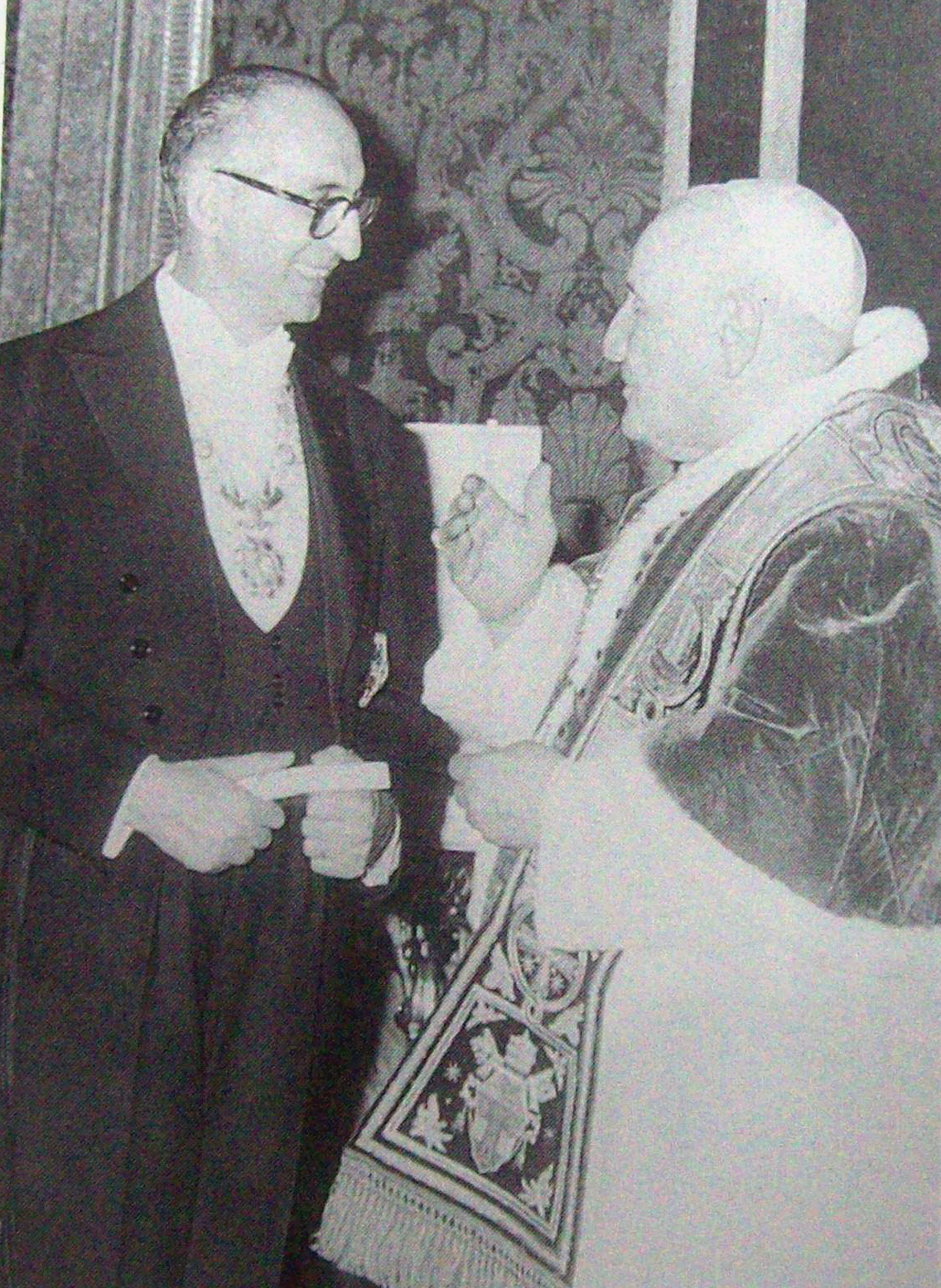
President Arturo Frondizi with Pope John XXIII at the Vatican; June 1960.

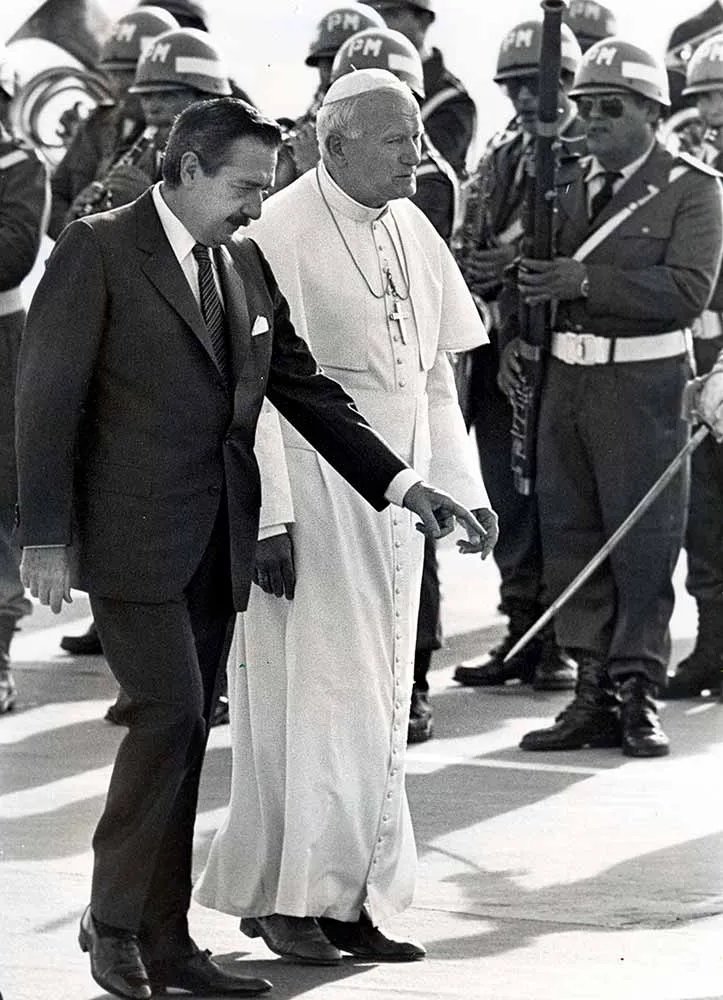
Pope John Paul II and President Raúl Alfonsín in Buenos Aires; April 1987.

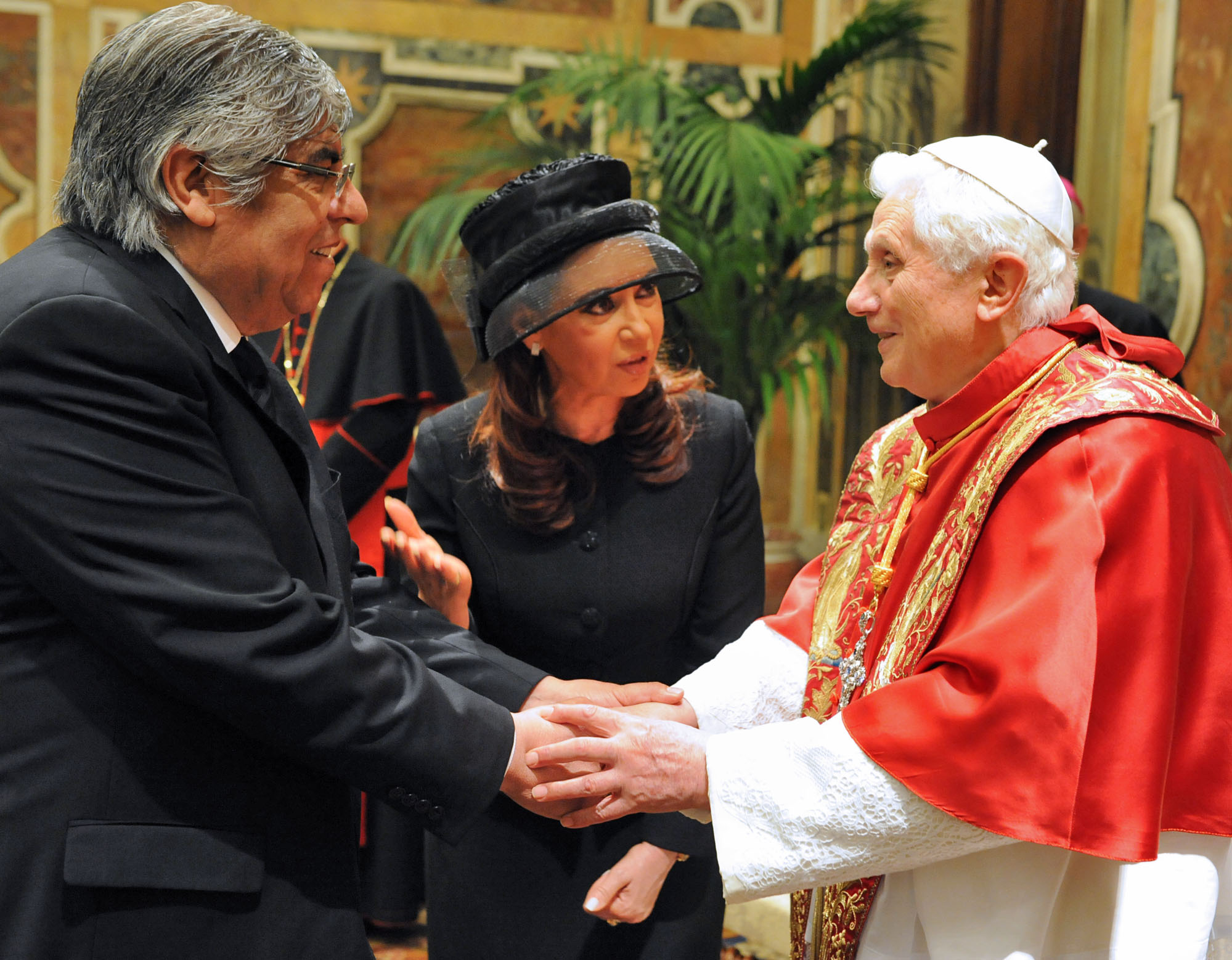
President Cristina Fernández and Pope Benedict XVI at the Vatican; November 2009.

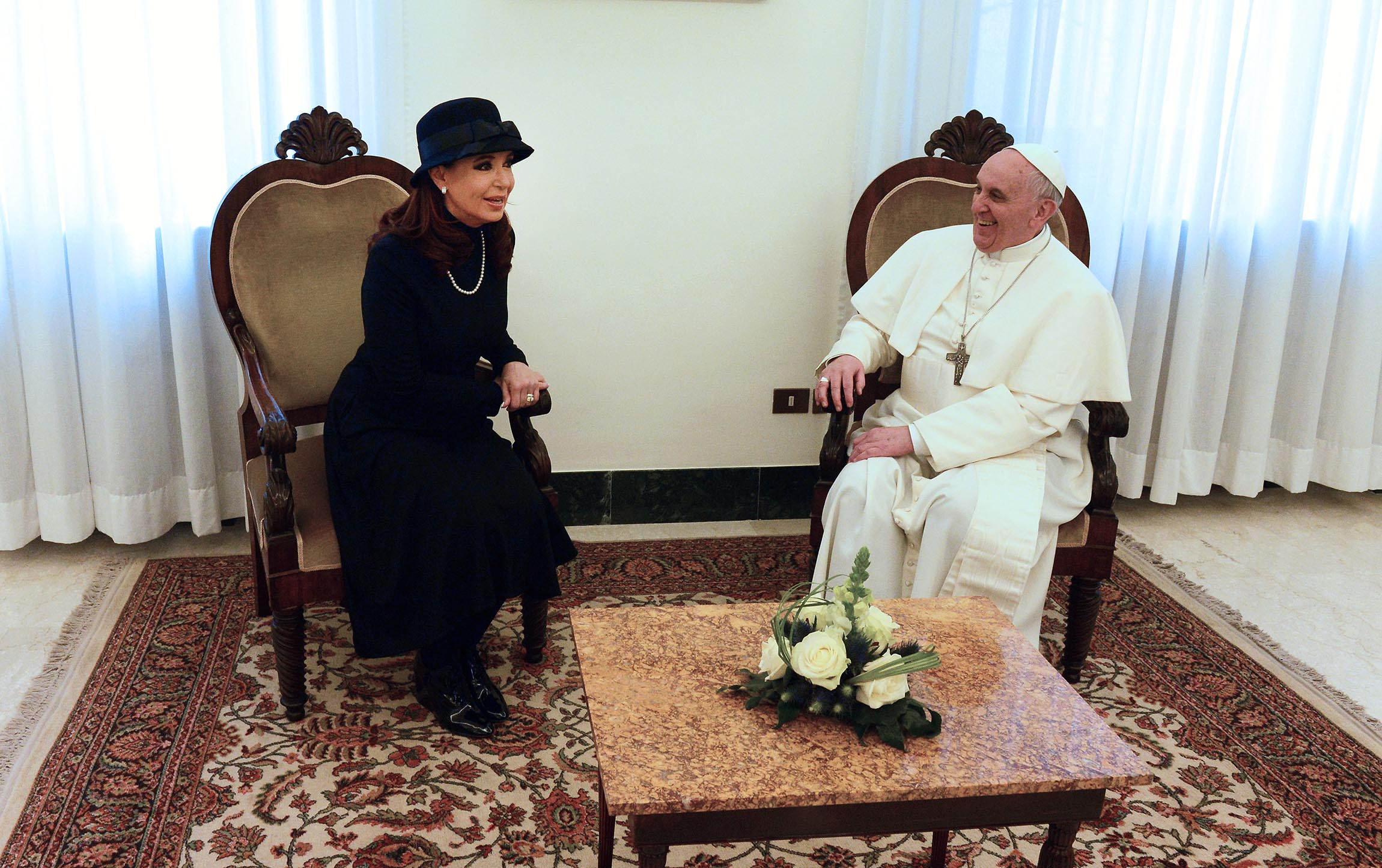
President Cristina Fernández and Pope Francis at the Vatican; March 2013.

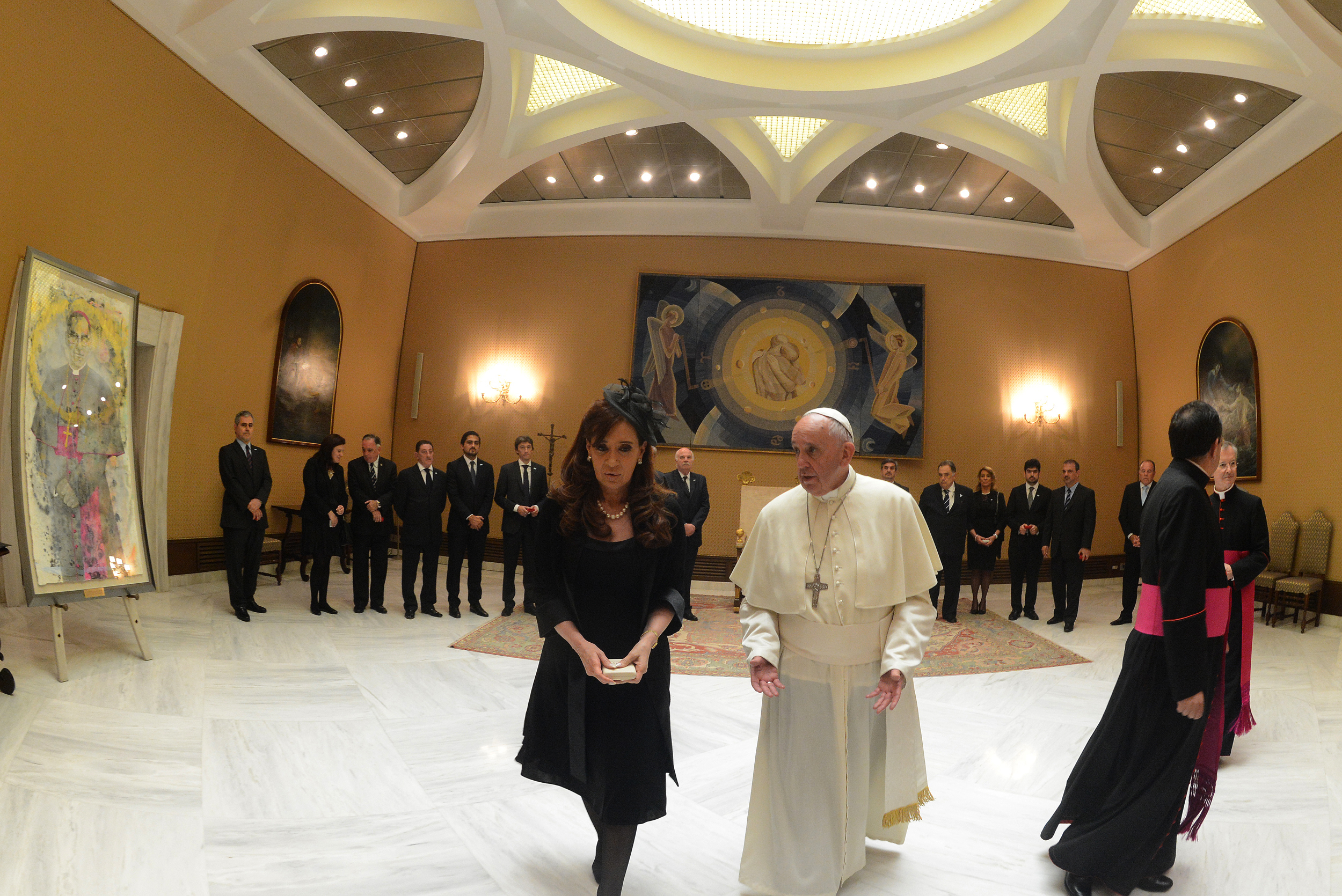
President Cristina Fernández and Pope Francis at the Vatican; June 2015.

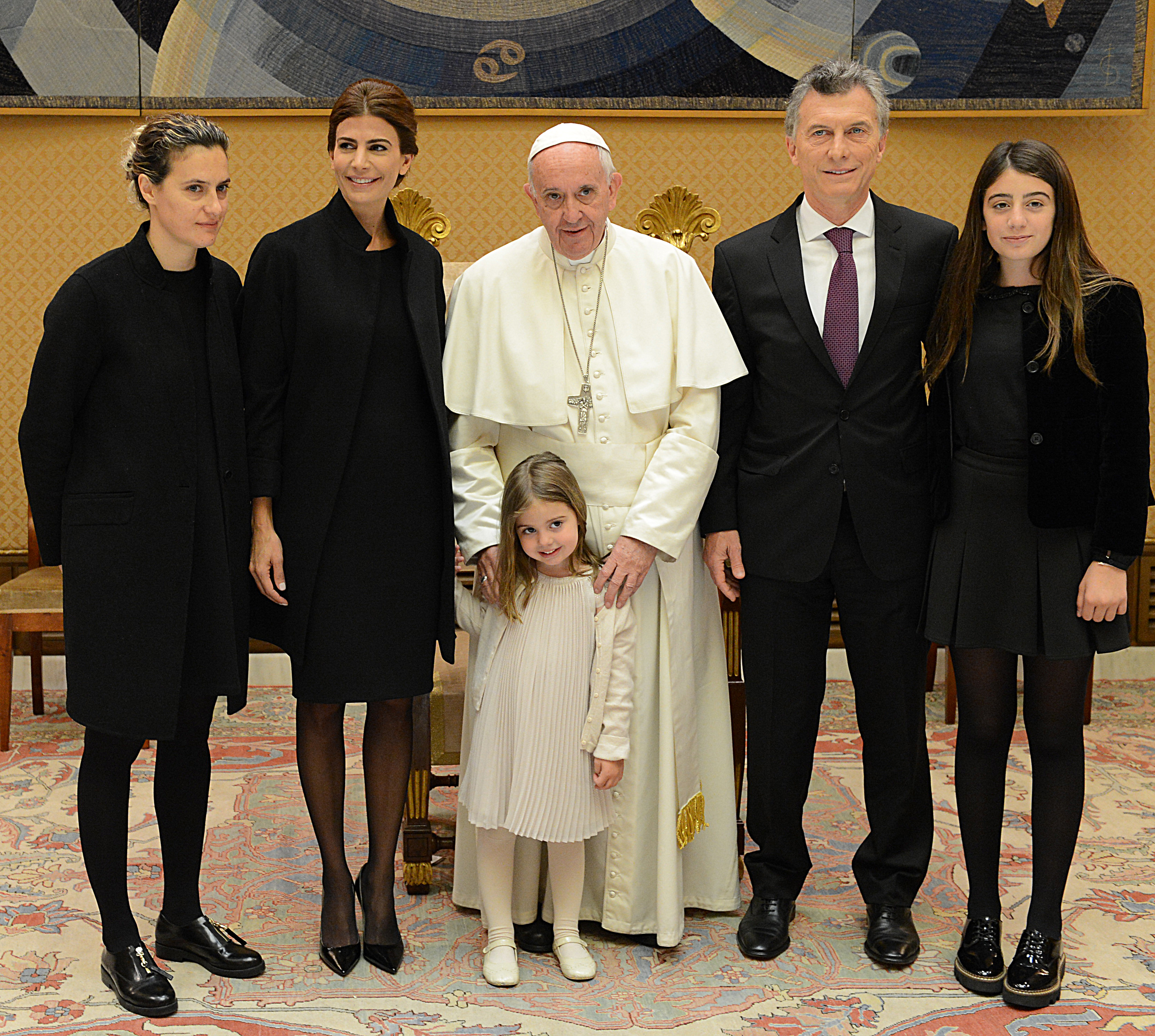
President Mauricio Macri and family and Pope Francis at the Vatican; October 2016.

== Resident diplomatic missions ==
- Argentina has an embassy to the Holy See based in Rome.
- Holy See has an Apostolic Nunciature in Buenos Aires.

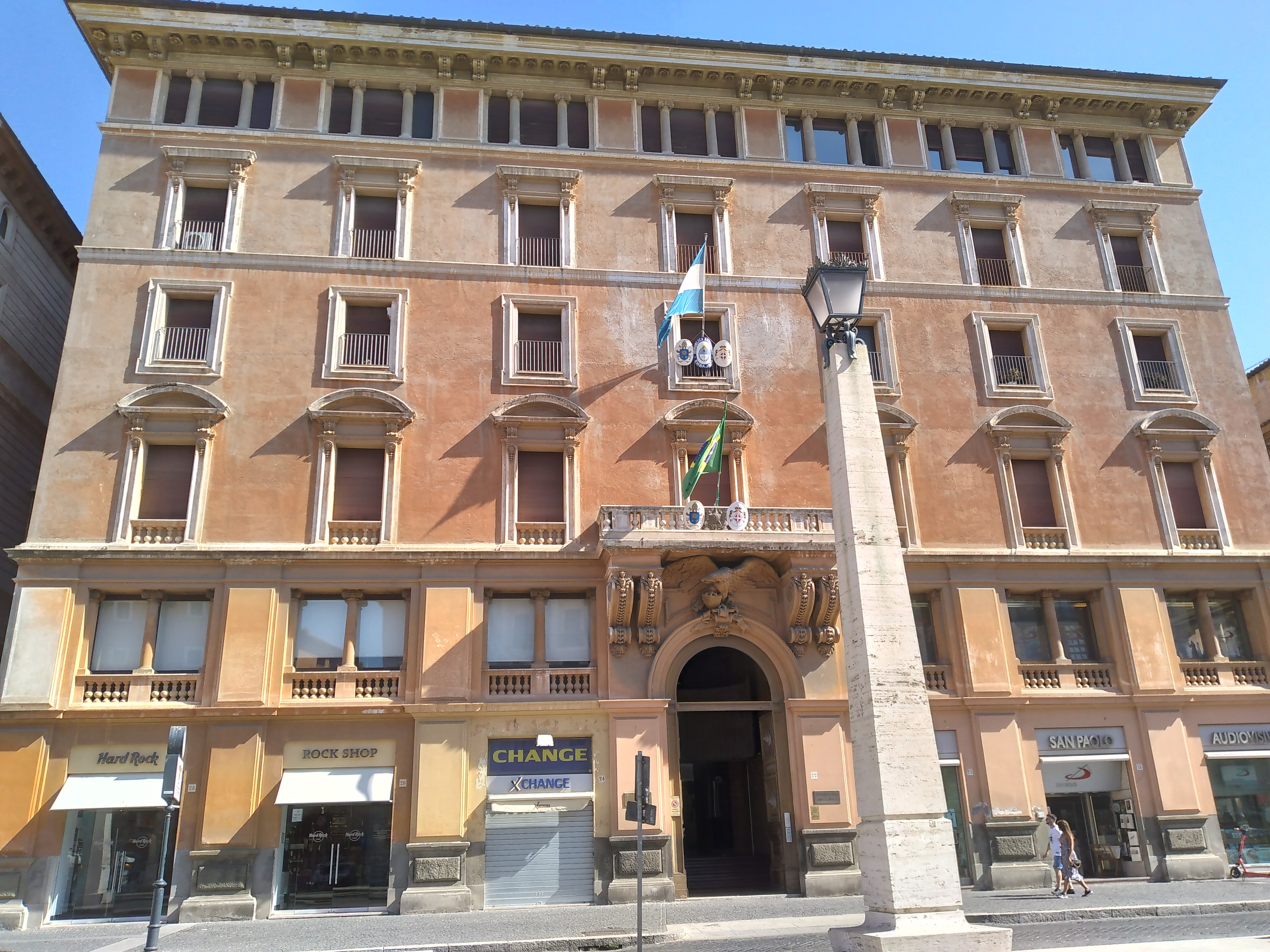
Embassy of Argentina to the Holy See in Rome

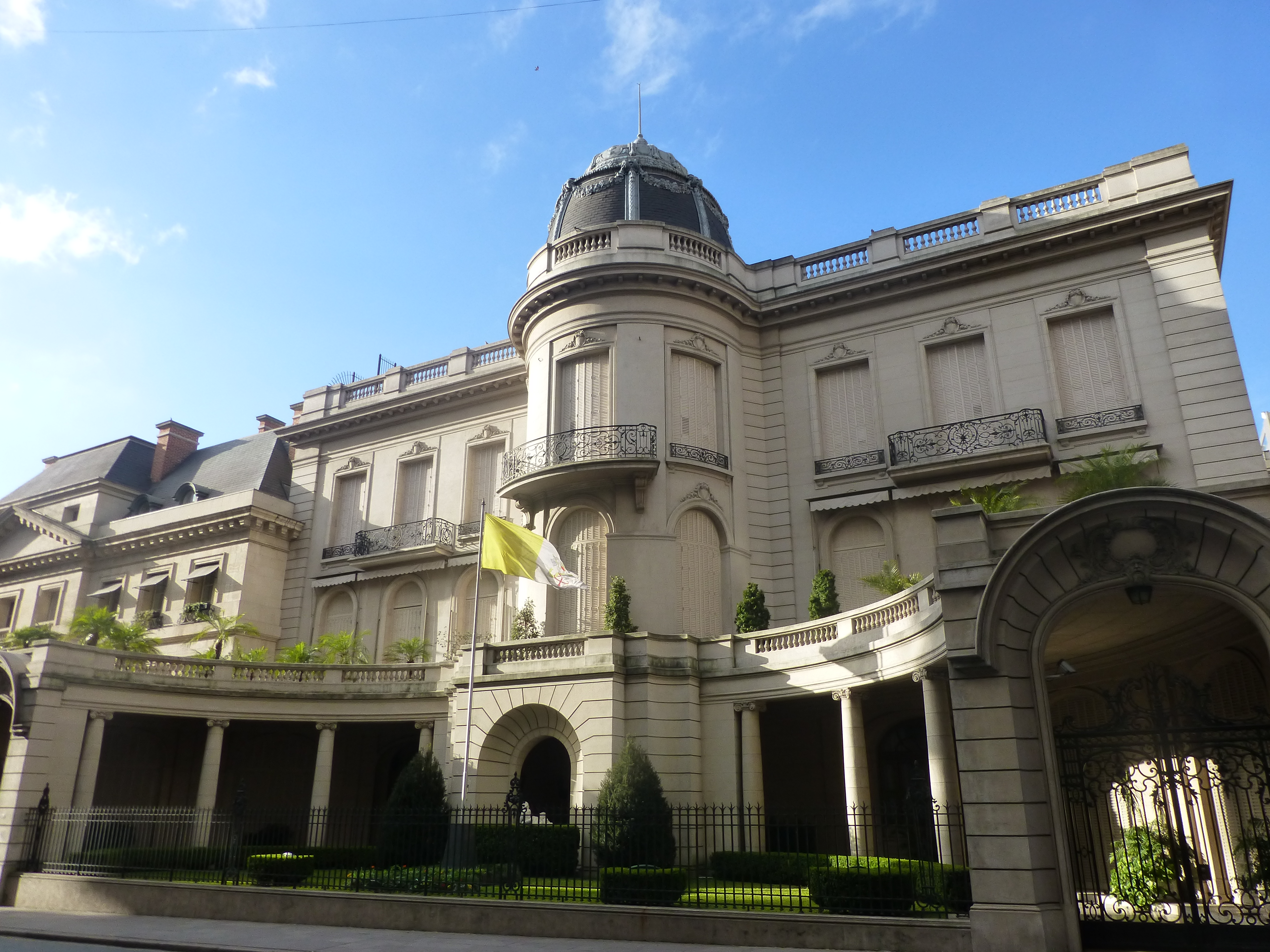
Apostolic Nunciature in Buenos Aires

== See also ==
- Apostolic Nuncio to Argentina
- Roman Catholicism in Argentina
