= Ministry of Health (Argentina) =

Government ministry of Argentina

- Ministerio de Salud
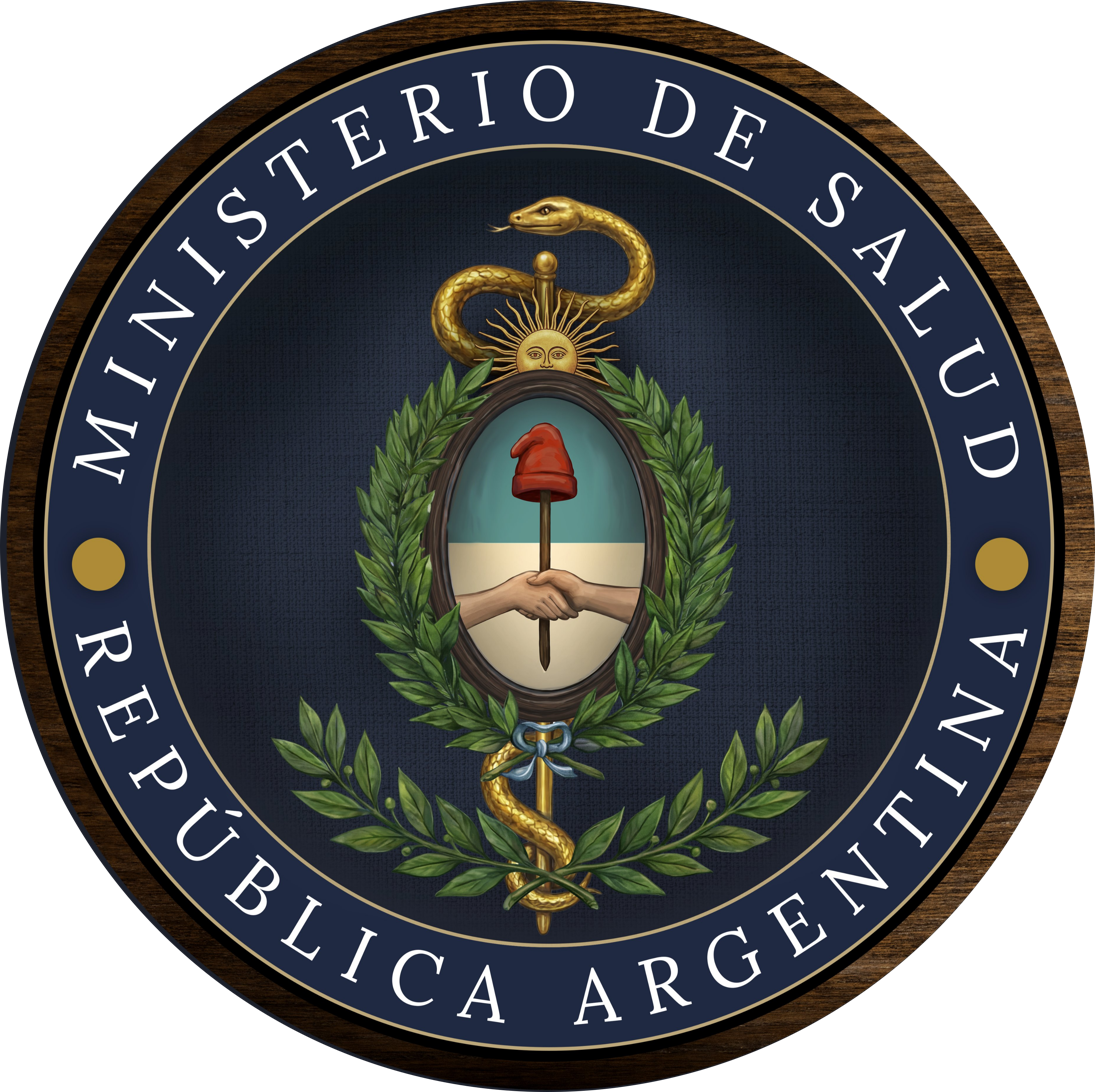

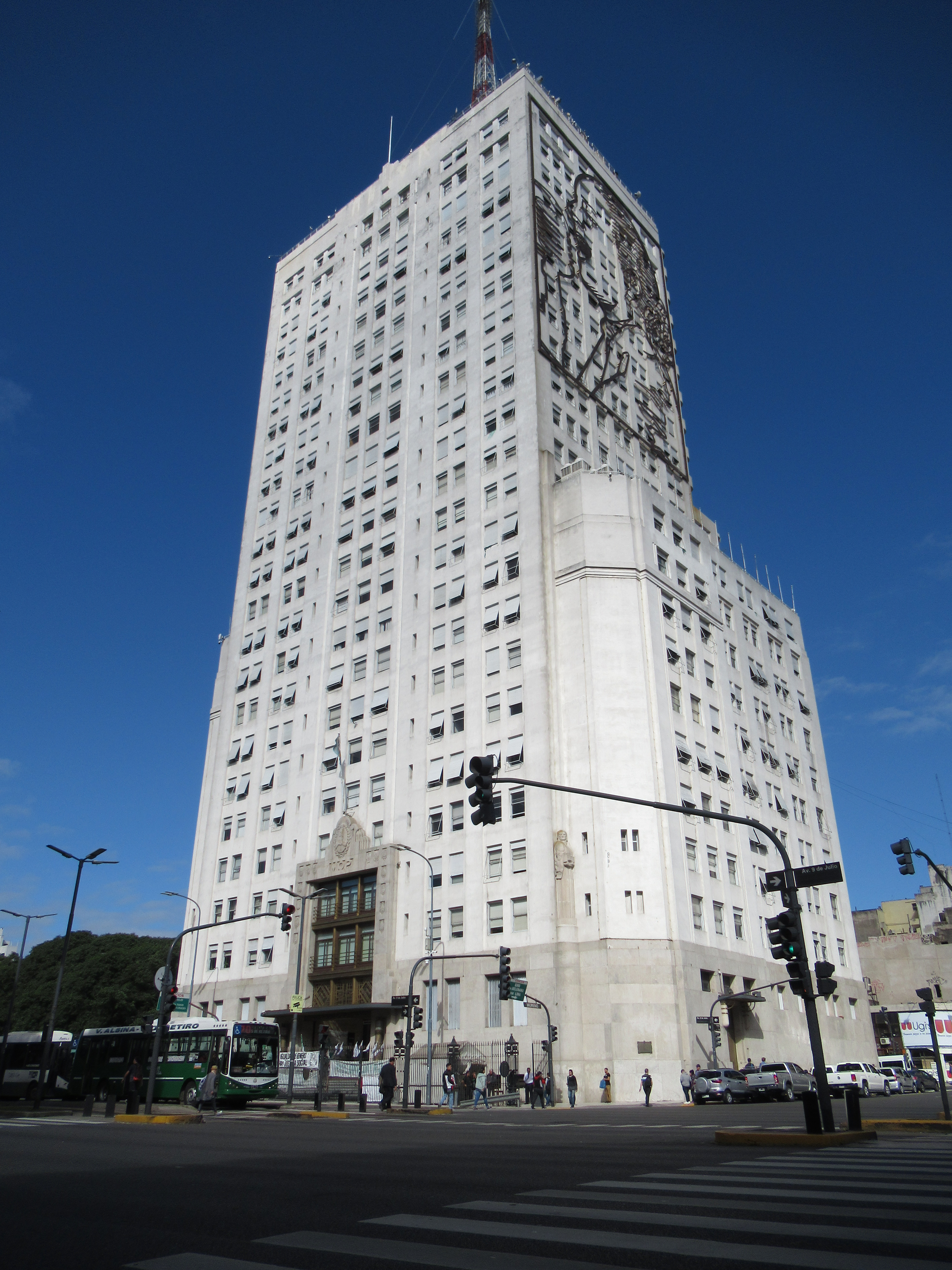
- Ministry of Public Works Building, now the headquarters of the Ministry of Health

Ministry overview
- Formed: 1949; 77 years ago (first creation)
- Preceding Ministry: Secretariat of Public Health
- Jurisdiction: Government of Argentina
- Headquarters: Ministry of Public Works Building, Av. 9 de Julio 1925, Buenos Aires
- Annual budget: $ 70,680,000 (2020)
- Minister responsible: Mario Lugones
- Child agencies: PAMI
- Website: argentina.gob.ar/salud

The Ministry of Health (Spanish: Ministerio de Salud) of Argentina is a ministry of the national executive power that oversees, elaborates and coordinates the Argentine national state's public health policy. The ministry is responsible for overseeing Argentina's highly decentralized universal health care system, which according to 2000 figures, serviced over half of the country's population.

Since 30 September 2024, the Minister of Health has been Mario Lugones, appointed by President Javier Milei.

== Structure and dependencies ==
The Ministry of Health and Sustainable Development has a number of centralized and decentralized dependencies. The centralized dependencies, as in other government ministers, are known as secretariats (secretarías) and undersecretariats (subsecretarías), as well as a number of other centralized agencies; each of the undersecretariats of the ministry has a number of directorates and other centralized agencies, which assess different types of healthcare-related areas:

- Secretariat of Health Quality (Secretaría de Calidad en Salud)
  - Undersecretariat of Quality, Regulation and Fiscalization (Subsecretaría de Calidad, Regulación y Fiscalización)
  - Undersecretariat of Services and Institutes Administration (Subsecretaría de Gestión de Servicios e Institutos)
- Secretariat of Health Equality (Secretaría de Equidad en Salud)
  - Undersecretariat of Federal Articulation (Subsecretaría de Articulación Federal)
  - Undersecretariat of Systems Integration (Subsecretaría de Integración de los Sistemas)
- Secretariat of Health Access (Secretaría de Acceso a la Salud)
  - Undersecretariat of Medication and Strategic Information (Subsecretaría de Medicamentos e Información Estratégica)
  - Undersecretariat of Health Strategies (Subsecretaría de Estrategias Sanitarias)

Several "deconcentrated" agencies also report to and depend on the Ministry of Health, such as the Superintendency of Health Services (SSS), the National Agency of Public Laboratories (ANLAP), the Comprehensive Medical Attention Program (PAMI), the National Administration of Medicine, Food and Medical Technology (ANMAT), the Dr. Carlos Malbrán National Administration of Laboratories and Healthcare Institutes (ANLIS Malbrán), and the National Cancer and National Tropical Medicine Institutes.

There are also a number of decentralized agencies that report to the Ministry, such as the National Psycho-physical Rehabilitation Institute of the South (INAREPS), the Only Central National Institute for Excision and Implants (Incucai), the Dr. Manuel Montes de Oca National Summer Camp, and the Baldomero Sommer, Laura Bonaparte and Alejandro Posadas national hospitals.

== Headquarters ==
The Ministry of Health has been headquartered in the Ministry of Public Works Building (which, as its name indicates, was originally the headquarters of the Ministry of Public Works) since 1991. The building is now considered an iconic landmark of Buenos Aires due to the large framed steel images of Eva Perón that hang from the southern and northern facades of the building, located at the interception of 9 de Julio Avenue and Belgrano Avenue, in the Monserrat barrio of Buenos Aires.

== List of ministers ==
| No. | Minister | Party | Term | President |
Ministry of Public Health (1949–1955)
| 1 | Ramón Carrillo | Peronist Party | 11 March 1949 – 27 July 1954 | Juan Domingo Perón |
| 2 | Raúl Conrado Bevacqua | Peronist Party | 27 July 1954 – 21 September 1955 | Juan Domingo Perón |
Ministry of Social Assistance and Public Health (1958–1966)
| 3 | Héctor Noblía | Radical Civic Union | 1 May 1958 – 26 March 1962 | Arturo Frondizi |
| 4 | Tiburcio Padilla | Radical Civic Union | 26 March 1962 – 1 July 1963 | Arturo Frondizi |
| 4 | Tiburcio Padilla | Radical Civic Union | 26 March 1962 – 1 July 1963 | José María Guido |
| 5 | Horacio Rodríguez Castells | Independent | 1 July 1963 – 12 October 1963 | José María Guido |
| 6 | Arturo Oñativia | Radical Civic Union | 12 October 1963 – 28 June 1966 | Arturo Illia |
Ministry of Public Health and Environment (1981–1983)
| 7 | Amílcar Argüelles | Independent (Military) | 29 March 1981 – 12 December 1981 | Roberto Viola |
| 8 | Horacio Rodríguez Castells | Independent | 12 December 1981 – 10 December 1983 | Leopoldo Galtieri |
| 8 | Horacio Rodríguez Castells | Independent | 12 December 1981 – 10 December 1983 | Reynaldo Bignone |
Ministry of Health and Social Action (1983–2001)
| 9 | Aldo Neri | Radical Civic Union | 10 December 1983 – 15 April 1986 | Raúl Alfonsín |
| 10 | Conrado Storani | Radical Civic Union | 15 April 1986 – 16 September 1987 | Raúl Alfonsín |
| 11 | Ricardo Barrios Arrechea | Radical Civic Union | 16 September 1987 – 26 May 1989 | Raúl Alfonsín |
| 12 | Enrique Beveraggi | Radical Civic Union | 26 May 1989 – 8 July 1989 | Raúl Alfonsín |
| 13 | Julio Corzo | Justicialist Party | 8 July 1989 – 23 September 1989 | Carlos Menem |
| 14 | Antonio Erman González | Justicialist Party | 23 September 1989 – 14 December 1989 | Carlos Menem |
| 15 | Eduardo Bauzá | Justicialist Party | 14 December 1989 – 20 September 1990 | Carlos Menem |
| 16 | Alberto Kohan | Justicialist Party | 20 September 1990 – 16 January 1991 | Carlos Menem |
| 17 | Avelino Porto | Independent | 16 January 1991 – 3 December 1991 | Carlos Menem |
| 18 | Julio César Aráoz | Justicialist Party | 3 December 1991 – 22 April 1993 | Carlos Menem |
| 19 | Alberto José Mazza | Justicialist Party | 22 April 1993 – 10 December 1999 | Carlos Menem |
| 20 | Héctor Lombardo | Radical Civic Union | 10 December 1999 – 20 December 2001 | Fernando de la Rúa |
Ministry of Health and the Environment (2001–2007)
| 21 | Ginés González García | Justicialist Party | 2 January 2002 – 10 December 2007 | Eduardo Duhalde |
| 21 | Ginés González García | Justicialist Party | 2 January 2002 – 10 December 2007 | Néstor Kirchner |
Ministry of Health (2007–2018)
| 22 | Graciela Ocaña | Independent | 10 December 2007 – 29 June 2009 | Cristina Fernández de Kirchner |
| 23 | Juan Luis Manzur | Justicialist Party | 29 June 2009 – 26 February 2015 | Cristina Fernández de Kirchner |
| 24 | Daniel Gollán | Independent | 26 February 2015 – 10 December 2015 | Cristina Fernández de Kirchner |
| 25 | Jorge Lemus | Republican Proposal | 10 December 2015 – 21 November 2017 | Mauricio Macri |
| 26 | Adolfo Rubinstein | Radical Civic Union | 21 November 2017 – 5 September 2018 | Mauricio Macri |
Ministry of Health and Social Development (2018–2019)
| 27 | Carolina Stanley | Republican Proposal | 5 September 2018 – 10 December 2019 | Mauricio Macri |
Ministry of Health (2019–Present)
| 28 | Ginés González García | Justicialist Party | 10 December 2019 – 19 February 2021 | Alberto Fernández |
| 29 | Carla Vizzotti | Independent | 20 February 2021 – 10 December 2023 | Alberto Fernández |
| 30 | Mario Russo | Independent | 10 December 2023 – 27 September 2024 | Javier Milei |
| 31 | Mario Lugones | Independent | 30 September 2024 – present | Javier Milei |

== See also ==
- Health care in Argentina
- List of hospitals in Argentina
