= Ministry of the Interior (Argentina) =

Government ministry in Argentina

- Ministerio del Interior
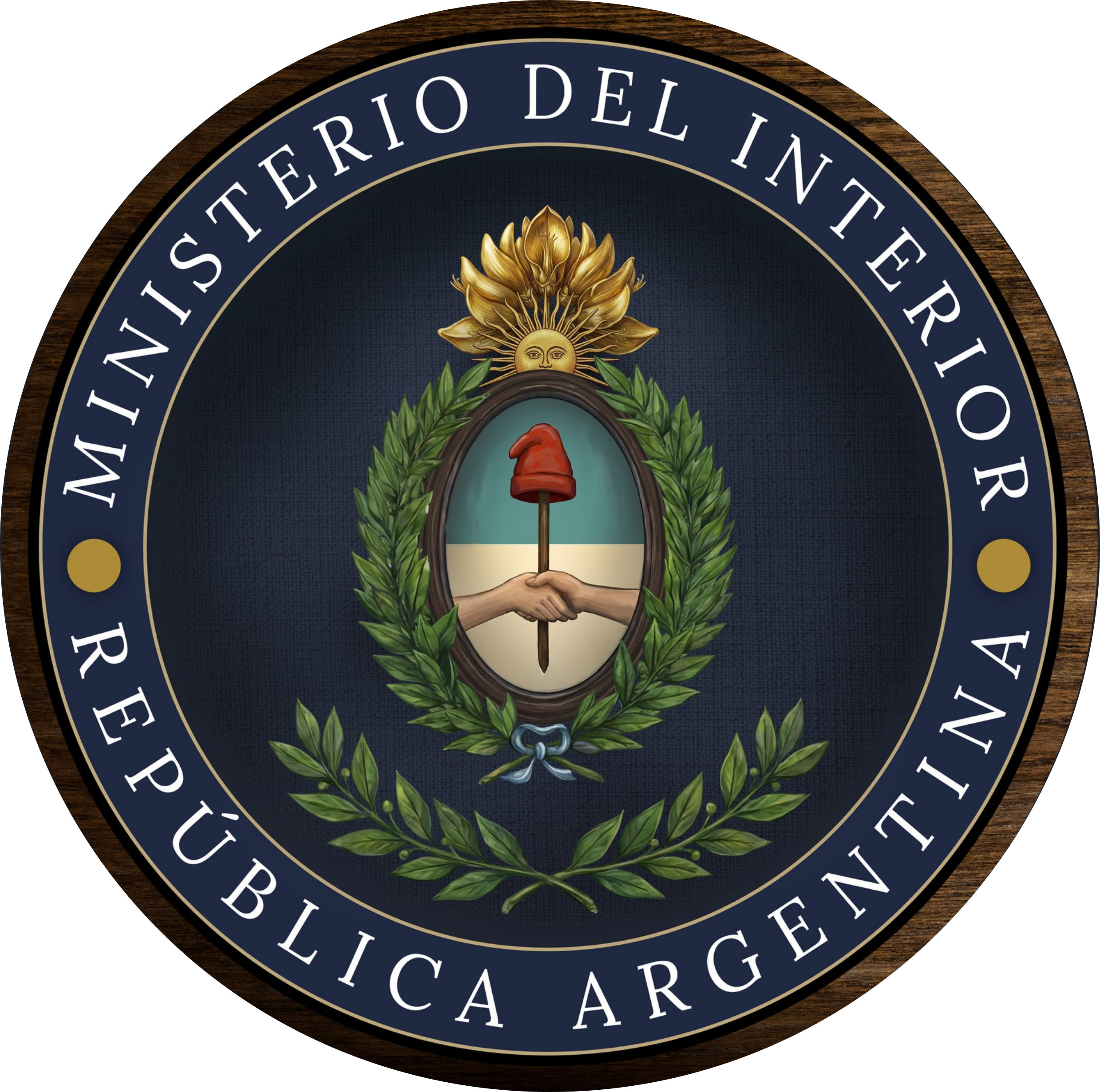

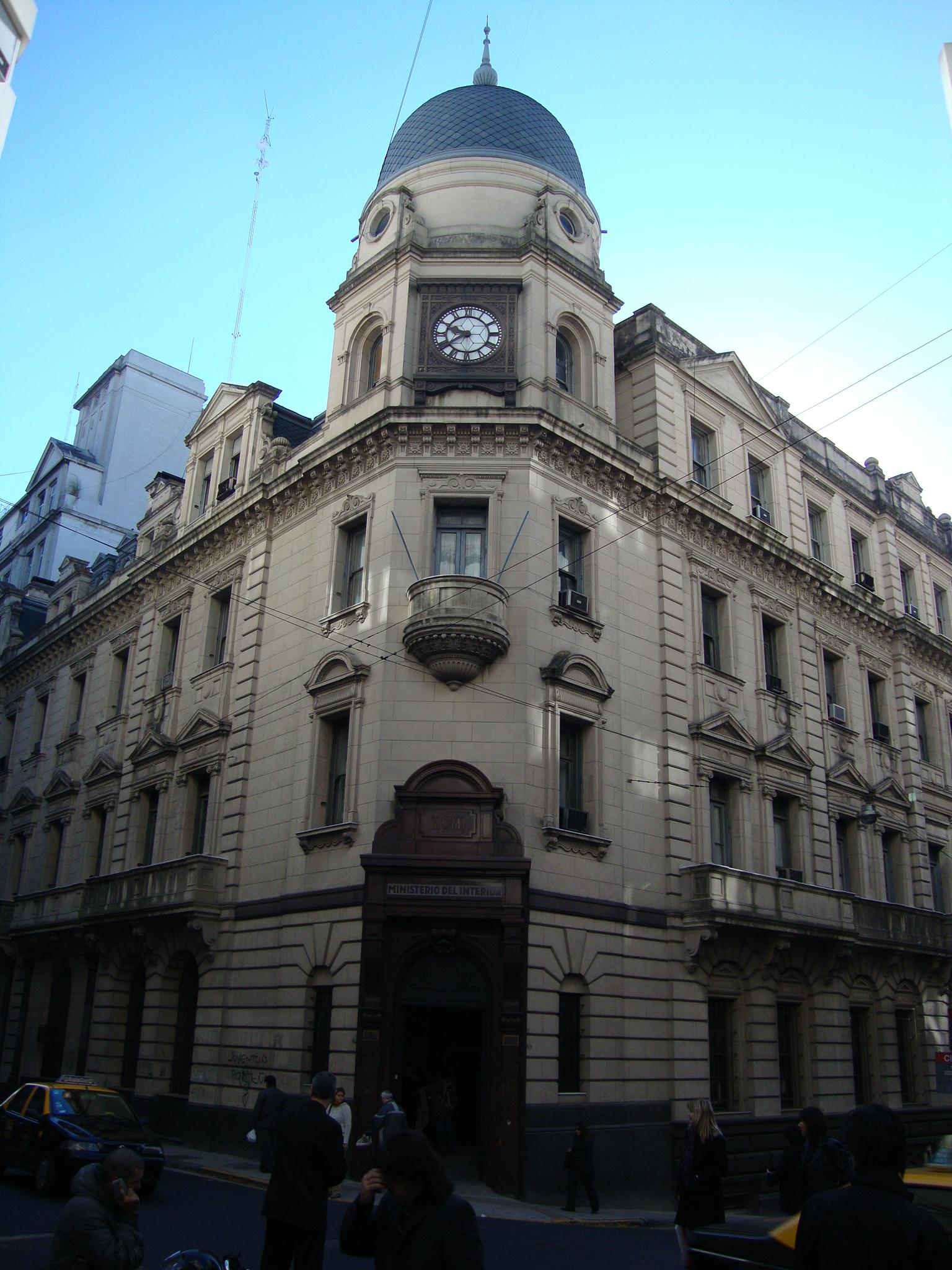
- Headquarters of the Ministry in Buenos Aires, 2010

Ministry overview
- Formed: 1854; 172 years ago
- Type: Ministry (1854–2024); Secretariat (2024–2025); Ministry (2025–)
- Jurisdiction: Government of Argentina
- Headquarters: Av. 25 de Mayo 101, Buenos Aires
- Annual budget: $ 60,725,000 (2018)
- Ministry executive: Diego Santilli
- Child agencies: National Directorate for Migration
- Website: argentina.gob.ar/interior

The Ministry of the Interior of Argentina is a ministry of the national executive power that manages issues pertaining to domestic politics such as immigration and co-ordination between the federal government and the governments of the provinces of Argentina.

The agency is one of the oldest ministries in the Argentine government, having existed continuously since the formation of the first Argentine executive in 1854, in the presidency of Justo José de Urquiza. The office is currently held by Diego Santilli.

== History ==
The Ministry of the Interior was one of the first five cabinet ministries formed by the first president of the Argentine Confederation, Justo José de Urquiza, upon his ascension to the presidency on 5 March 1854. The first interior minister was Benjamín Gorostiaga (es).

When Argentina became a republic after the Confederation was dissolved, Guillermo Rawson was the first Minister of Interior appointed by then president Bartolomé Mitre.

The name of the ministry remained unchanged for over a century until the presidency of Juan Domingo Perón, when it was merged with the Justice portfolio under the administration of Ángel Borlenghi.

The military administration of Eduardo Lonardi restored the ministry its former name in 1955, and it was not until 2012 during the presidency of Cristina Fernández de Kirchner that an additional portfolio, this time that of the transport ministry, was incorporated into the Interior portfolio. The successive administration of Mauricio Macri added further responsibilities, merging the ministry with public works and housing.

In 2019, President Alberto Fernández reorganized the cabinet ministries and separated the public works and housing responsibilities from the Interior Ministry, rendering back to its original name again.

After President Javier Milei took office in 2023, the ministry was downgraded into a secretariat as part of his pledge to reduce public deficits and the size of the government. Milei reversed the decision in September 2025 amid efforts to build alliances with opposition governors following his party's defeat in the 2025 Buenos Aires provincial election.

== Attributions and structure ==
Article 17 of the current Law on Ministries, adopted in 2019, lays out the purported attributions and responsibilities of the Ministry of the Interior of Argentina. According to the law, it is within the Ministry's responsibilities to assist the President and the Chief of Cabinet on all matters pertaining to the internal governance and the exercise of principles and constitutional guarantees, safekeeping the republican, representative and federal government.

Some particular issues that are within the ministry's jurisdiction include judging on when it is pertinent to declare a state of siege; dealing with proposals of constitutional reform and organizing constitutional conventions when it is necessary; and maintaining a state of co-operation between the governments of the provinces of Argentina and the Autonomous City of Buenos Aires, including inter-jurisdictional matters and relations, and coordinating policies that help and promote regional growth.

=== Structure and dependencies ===
The Ministry of the Interior has a number of centralized and decentralized dependencies. The centralized dependencies, as in other government ministers, are known as secretariats (secretarías) and undersecretariats (subsecretarías); this is the current structure of the Ministry:

- Cabinet of Advisors Unit (Unidad Gabinete de Asesores)
- Administrative Coordination Secretariat (Secretaría de Coordinación Administrativa)
  - Legal Undersecretariat (Subsecretaría Legal)
  - Undersecretariat of Administrative Management (Subsecretaría de Gestión Administrativa)
- Secretariat of the Interior (Secretaría del Interior)
  - Undersecretariat of the Interior (Subsecretaría del Interior)
  - Undersecretatiat of Political Affairs (Subsecretaría de Asuntos Políticos)
  - National Directorate for Migration (Dirección Nacional de Migraciones; DNM)
  - National Persons Registry (Registro Nacional de las Personas, Renaper)
- Secretariat of Provinces and Municipalities (Secretaría de Provincias y Municipios)
  - Undersecretariat of Provincial Relations (Subsecretaría de Relaciones con las Provincias)
  - Undersecretariat of Municipal Relations (Subsecretaría de Relaciones con los Municipios)
- Secretariat of Tourism, Environment and Sports (Secretaría de Turismo, Ambiente y Deportes)
  - Undersecretariat of Tourism (Subsecretaría de Turismo)
  - Undersecretariat of Environment (Subsecretaría de Ambiente)
  - Undersecretariat of Sports (Subsecretaría de Deportes)
  - National Institute of Touristic Promotion (Instituto Nacional de Promoción Turística; INPROTUR)
  - National Anti-Doping Commission (Comisión Nacional Antidopaje)
  - National High Performance Sports Entity (Ente Nacional de Alto Rendimiento Deportivo; ENARD)
- National Parks Administration (Administración de Parques Nacionales; APN)

Several decentralized agencies also report to the Ministry of the Interior, such as the National Directorate for Migration (Dirección Nacional de Migraciones; DNM), the National Persons Registry (Registro Nacional de las Personas, Renaper), and the General Archive of the Nation.

== Headquarters ==
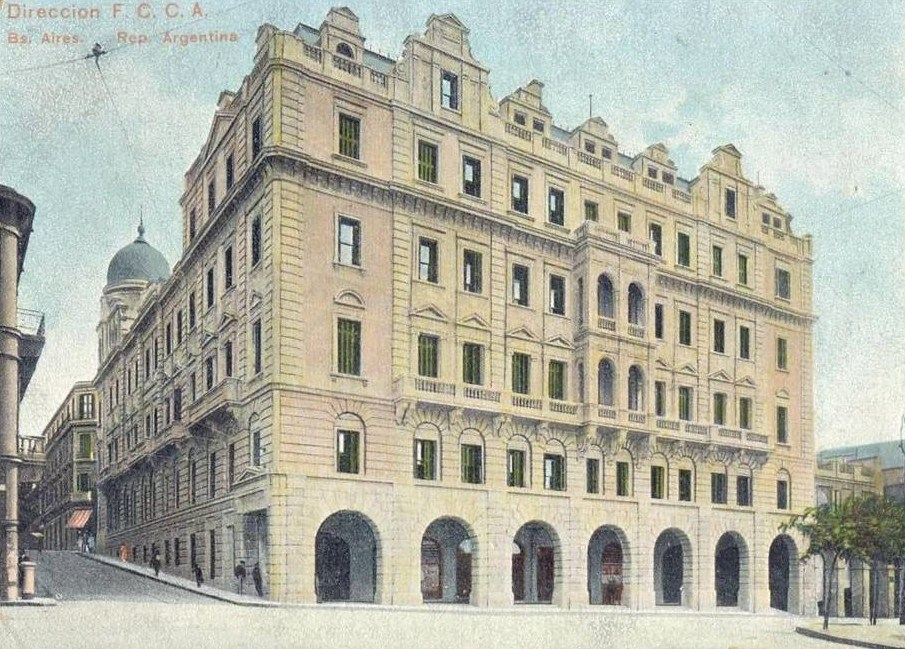
Old Central Argentine Railway building, current headquarters of the Ministry of the Interior, as seen from Leandro N. Alem Avenue (c. 1900).

The Ministry of the Interior is headquartered at 25 de Mayo Avenue 101, in the San Nicolás barrio in Buenos Aires. The building originally housed the headquarters of the Central Argentine Railway.

== List of ministers and secretaries ==
| No. | Minister | Party | Term | President |
Ministry of the Interior (1854–1954)
| 1 | Benjamín Gorostiaga | Unitarian Party | 5 March 1854 – 11 October 1854 | Justo José de Urquiza |
| 2 | Santiago Derqui | Federalist Party | 11 October 1854 – 12 February 1860 | Justo José de Urquiza |
| 3 | Luis José de la Peña | Independent | 12 February 1860 – 5 March 1860 | Justo José de Urquiza |
| 4 | Juan Gregorio Pujol | Federalist Party | 5 March 1860 – 22 November 1860 | Santiago Derqui |
| 5 | Salustiano Zavalía | Unitarian Party | 22 November 1860 – 29 May 1861 | Santiago Derqui |
| 6 | Severo González | Federalist Party | 29 May 1861 – 5 November 1861 | Santiago Derqui |
| 7 | Guillermo Rawson | Nationalist Party | 12 October 1862 – 12 October 1868 | Bartolomé Mitre |
| 8 | Dalmacio Vélez Sársfield | Nationalist Party | 12 October 1868 – 1 May 1872 | Domingo Faustino Sarmiento |
| 9 | Uladislao Frías | Nationalist Party | 1 May 1872 – 12 October 1874 | Domingo Faustino Sarmiento |
| 10 | Simón de Iriondo | National Autonomist Party | 12 October 1874 – 25 August 1877 | Nicolás Avellaneda |
| 11 | Bernardo de Irigoyen | National Autonomist Party | 25 August 1877 – 6 May 1878 | Nicolás Avellaneda |
| 12 | Saturnino Laspiur | National Autonomist Party | 6 May 1878 – 25 August 1878 | Nicolás Avellaneda |
| 13 | Domingo Faustino Sarmiento | National Autonomist Party | 25 August 1878 – 9 October 1879 | Nicolás Avellaneda |
| 14 | Benjamín Zorrilla | National Autonomist Party | 9 October 1879 – 12 October 1880 | Nicolás Avellaneda |
| 15 | Antonio del Viso | National Autonomist Party | 12 October 1880 – 11 February 1882 | Julio Argentino Roca |
| 16 | Bernardo de Irigoyen | National Autonomist Party | 11 February 1882 – 30 May 1885 | Julio Argentino Roca |
| 17 | Benjamín Paz | Independent | 30 May 1885 – 9 February 1886 | Julio Argentino Roca |
| 18 | Isaac Chavarría | National Autonomist Party | 9 February 1886 – 12 October 1886 | Julio Argentino Roca |
| 19 | Eduardo Wilde | National Autonomist Party | 12 October 1886 – 20 January 1889 | Miguel Juárez Celman |
| 20 | Manuel Zorrilla | National Autonomist Party | 20 January 1889 – 28 February 1889 | Miguel Juárez Celman |
| 21 | Wenceslao Pacheco | National Autonomist Party | 28 February 1889 – 27 August 1889 | Miguel Juárez Celman |
| 22 | Norberto Quirno Costa | National Autonomist Party | 27 August 1889 – 14 April 1890 | Miguel Juárez Celman |
| 23 | Salustiano Zavalía | National Autonomist Party | 14 April 1890 – 6 August 1890 | Miguel Juárez Celman |
| 24 | Julio Argentino Roca | National Autonomist Party | 6 August 1890 – 1 May 1891 | Carlos Pellegrini |
| 25 | José Vicente Zapata | National Autonomist Party | 1 May 1891 – 12 October 1892 | Carlos Pellegrini |
| 26 | Manuel Quintana | National Autonomist Party | 12 October 1892 – 13 December 1892 | Luis Sáenz Peña |
| 27 | Tomás de Anchorena | National Autonomist Party | 13 December 1892 – 8 February 1893 | Luis Sáenz Peña |
| 28 | Wenceslao Escalante | National Autonomist Party | 8 February 1893 – 14 June 1893 | Luis Sáenz Peña |
| 29 | Miguel Cané | National Autonomist Party | 14 June 1893 – 5 July 1893 | Luis Sáenz Peña |
| 30 | Lucio Vicente López | National Autonomist Party | 5 July 1893 – 12 August 1893 | Luis Sáenz Peña |
| 31 | Manuel Quintana | National Autonomist Party | 12 August 1893 – 7 November 1894 | Luis Sáenz Peña |
| 32 | Eduardo Costa | National Autonomist Party | 7 November 1894 – 23 January 1895 | Luis Sáenz Peña |
| 33 | Benjamín Zorrilla | National Autonomist Party | 23 January 1895 – 20 July 1895 | José Evaristo Uriburu |
| 34 | Norberto Quirno Costa | National Autonomist Party | 20 July 1895 – 12 October 1898 | José Evaristo Uriburu |
| 35 | Felipe Yofre | National Autonomist Party | 12 October 1898 – 26 August 1901 | Julio Argentino Roca |
| 36 | Joaquín V. González | National Autonomist Party | 9 September 1901 – 12 October 1904 | Julio Argentino Roca |
| 37 | Rafael Castillo | National Autonomist Party | 12 October 1904 – 12 March 1906 | Manuel Quintana |
| 38 | Norberto Quirno Costa | National Autonomist Party | 14 March 1906 – 10 July 1906 | José Figueroa Alcorta |
| 39 | Manuel Montes de Oca | National Autonomist Party | 11 July 1906 – 25 September 1906 | José Figueroa Alcorta |
| 40 | Joaquín V. González | National Autonomist Party | 25 September 1906 – 21 November 1906 | José Figueroa Alcorta |
| 41 | Manuel Montes de Oca | National Autonomist Party | 21 November 1906 – 27 September 1907 | José Figueroa Alcorta |
| 42 | Marco Aurelio Avellaneda | National Autonomist Party | 27 September 1907 – 8 March 1910 | José Figueroa Alcorta |
| 43 | José Gálvez | National Autonomist Party | 8 March 1910 – 23 July 1910 | José Figueroa Alcorta |
| 44 | Carlos Rodríguez Larreta | National Autonomist Party | 23 July 1910 – 12 October 1910 | José Figueroa Alcorta |
| 45 | Indalecio Gómez | National Autonomist Party | 12 October 1910 – 12 February 1914 | Roque Sáenz Peña |
| 46 | Miguel S. Ortiz | National Autonomist Party | 16 February 1914 – 12 October 1916 | Roque Sáenz Peña |
| 46 | Miguel S. Ortiz | National Autonomist Party | 16 February 1914 – 12 October 1916 | Victorino de la Plaza |
| 47 | Ramón Gómez | Radical Civic Union | 12 October 1916 – 10 April 1922 | Hipólito Yrigoyen |
| 48 | Francisco Beiró | Radical Civic Union | 10 April 1922 – 12 October 1922 | Hipólito Yrigoyen |
| 49 | José Nicolás Matienzo | Radical Civic Union | 12 October 1922 – 26 November 1923 | Marcelo T. de Alvear |
| 50 | Vicente Gallo | Radical Civic Union | 12 December 1923 – 27 July 1925 | Marcelo T. de Alvear |
| 51 | José P. Tamborini | Radical Civic Union | 5 August 1925 – 12 October 1928 | Marcelo T. de Alvear |
| 52 | Elpidio González | Radical Civic Union | 12 October 1928 – 6 September 1930 | Hipólito Yrigoyen |
| 53 | Matías Sánchez Sorondo | National Democratic Party | 6 September 1930 – 15 April 1931 | José Félix Uriburu |
| 54 | Octavio Sergio Pico | Radical Civic Union | 16 April 1931 – 20 February 1932 | José Félix Uriburu |
| 55 | Leopoldo Melo | Radical Civic Union | 20 February 1932 – 29 April 1936 | Agustín Pedro Justo |
| 56 | Ramón S. Castillo | National Democratic Party | 29 April 1936 – 21 June 1937 | Agustín Pedro Justo |
| 57 | Manuel Ramón Alvarado | National Democratic Party | 21 June 1937 – 20 February 1938 | Agustín Pedro Justo |
| 58 | Diógenes Taboada | Radical Civic Union | 20 February 1938 – 2 September 1940 | Roberto M. Ortiz |
| 59 | Miguel J. Culaciati | Radical Civic Union | 2 September 1940 – 4 June 1943 | Roberto M. Ortiz |
| 59 | Miguel J. Culaciati | Radical Civic Union | 2 September 1940 – 4 June 1943 | Ramón S. Castillo |
| 60 | Alberto Gilbert | Independent (Military) | 4 June 1943 – 21 October 1943 | Pedro Pablo Ramírez |
| 61 | Luis César Perlinger | Independent (Military) | 21 October 1943 – 6 June 1944 | Pedro Pablo Ramírez |
| 61 | Luis César Perlinger | Independent (Military) | 21 October 1943 – 6 June 1944 | Edelmiro Farrell |
| 62 | Alberto Tessaire | Independent (Military) | 6 June 1944 – 4 August 1945 | Edelmiro Farrell |
| 63 | Juan Hortensio Quijano | Radical Civic Union | 4 August 1945 – 8 October 1945 | Edelmiro Farrell |
| 64 | Eduardo Ávalos | Independent (Military) | 8 October 1945 – 17 October 1945 | Edelmiro Farrell |
| 65 | Bartolomé Descalzo | Independent (Military) | 20 October 1945 – 2 November 1945 | Edelmiro Farrell |
| 66 | Felipe Urdapilleta | Independent (Military) | 2 November 1945 – 4 June 1946 | Edelmiro Farrell |
| 67 | Ángel Borlenghi | Peronist Party | 4 June 1946 – 24 July 1954 | Juan Domingo Perón |
Ministry of the Interior and Justice (1954–1955)
| 67 | Ángel Borlenghi | Peronist Party | 24 July 1954 – 29 June 1955 | Juan Domingo Perón |
| 68 | Oscar Albrieu | Peronist Party | 29 June 1955 – 21 September 1955 | Juan Domingo Perón |
| 69 | Eduardo Busso | Independent | 21 September 1955 – 12 November 1955 | Eduardo Lonardi |
Ministry of the Interior (1955–2012)
| 70 | Luis de Pablo Pardo | Independent | 12 November 1955 – 13 November 1955 | Eduardo Lonardi |
| 71 | Eduardo Busso | Independent | 13 November 1955 – 27 April 1956 | Pedro Eugenio Aramburu |
| 72 | Laureano Landaburu | Independent | 27 April 1956 – 25 January 1957 | Pedro Eugenio Aramburu |
| 73 | Carlos Alconada Aramburu | Radical Civic Union | 25 January 1957 – 24 March 1958 | Pedro Eugenio Aramburu |
| 74 | Ángel H. Cabral | Radical Civic Union | 24 March 1958 – 1 May 1958 | Pedro Eugenio Aramburu |
| 75 | Alfredo Roque Vítolo | Radical Civic Union | 1 May 1958 – 19 March 1962 | Arturo Frondizi |
| 76 | Hugo Vaca Narvaja | Radical Civic Union | 19 March 1962 – 29 March 1962 | Arturo Frondizi |
| 77 | Rodolfo Martínez | Christian Democratic Party | 29 March 1962 – 18 April 1962 | José María Guido |
| 78 | Jorge Walter Perkins | Radical Civic Union | 30 April 1962 – 26 June 1962 | José María Guido |
| 79 | Carlos Adrogué | Radical Civic Union | 26 June 1962 – 23 September 1962 | José María Guido |
| 80 | Rodolfo Martínez | Christian Democratic Party | 23 September 1962 – 9 April 1963 | José María Guido |
| 81 | Enrique Rauch | Independent (Military) | 9 April 1963 – 13 May 1963 | José María Guido |
| 82 | Osiris Villegas | Independent (Military) | 13 May 1963 – 12 October 1963 | José María Guido |
| 83 | Juan Palmero | Radical Civic Union | 12 October 1963 – 28 June 1966 | Arturo Illia |
| 84 | Enrique Martínez Paz | Córdoba Democratic Party | 28 June 1966 – 29 December 1966 | Juan Carlos Onganía |
| 85 | Guillermo Borda | Independent | 2 January 1967 – 8 June 1969 | Juan Carlos Onganía |
| 86 | Francisco A. Imaz | Independent (Military) | 10 June 1969 – 8 June 1970 | Juan Carlos Onganía |
| 87 | Eduardo Mac Loughlin | Independent (Military) | 18 June 1870 – 13 October 1970 | Roberto Levingston |
| 88 | Arturo Cordón Aguirre | Independent (Military) | 13 October 1970 – 23 March 1971 | Roberto Levingston |
| 89 | Arturo Mor Roig | Radical Civic Union | 26 March 1971 – 25 May 1973 | Alejandro Lanusse |
| 90 | Esteban Righi | Justicialist Party | 25 May 1973 – 13 July 1973 | Héctor Cámpora |
| 91 | Benito Llambí | Justicialist Party | 13 July 1973 – 13 August 1974 | Juan Domingo Perón |
| 91 | Benito Llambí | Justicialist Party | 13 July 1973 – 13 August 1974 | Raúl Lastiri |
| 91 | Benito Llambí | Justicialist Party | 13 July 1973 – 13 August 1974 | Isabel Perón |
| 92 | Alberto Rocamora | Justicialist Party | 14 August 1974 – 11 July 1975 | Isabel Perón |
| 93 | Antonio J. Benítez | Justicialist Party | 11 July 1975 – 11 August 1975 | Isabel Perón |
| 94 | Vicente Damasco | Justicialist Party | 11 August 1975 – 16 September 1975 | Isabel Perón |
| 95 | Ángel F. Robledo | Justicialist Party | 16 September 1975 – 15 January 1976 | Isabel Perón |
| 96 | Roberto Antonio Ares | Justicialist Party | 15 January 1976 – 24 March 1976 | Isabel Perón |
| 97 | Albano Harguindeguy | Independent (Military) | 24 March 1976 – 29 March 1981 | Jorge Rafael Videla |
| 98 | Horacio Tomás Liendo | Independent (Military) | 29 March 1981 – 12 December 1981 | Roberto Viola |
| 99 | Alfredo Oscar Saint Jean | Independent (Military) | 12 December 1981 – 1 July 1982 | Leopoldo Galtieri |
| 100 | Llamil Reston | Independent (Military) | 2 July 1982 – 10 December 1983 | Reynaldo Bignone |
| 101 | Antonio Tróccoli | Radical Civic Union | 10 December 1983 – 15 September 1987 | Raúl Alfonsín |
| 102 | Enrique Nosiglia | Radical Civic Union | 15 September 1987 – 26 May 1989 | Raúl Alfonsín |
| 103 | Juan Carlos Pugliese | Radical Civic Union | 26 May 1989 – 8 July 1989 | Raúl Alfonsín |
| 104 | Eduardo Bauzá | Justicialist Party | 8 July 1989 – 15 December 1990 | Carlos Menem |
| 105 | Julio Mera Figueroa | Justicialist Party | 15 December 1990 – 12 August 1991 | Carlos Menem |
| 106 | José Luis Manzano | Justicialist Party | 12 August 1991 – 4 December 1992 | Carlos Menem |
| 107 | Gustavo Béliz | Justicialist Party | 4 December 1992 – 23 August 1993 | Carlos Menem |
| 108 | Carlos Ruckauf | Justicialist Party | 23 August 1993 – 9 January 1995 | Carlos Menem |
| 109 | Carlos Corach | Justicialist Party | 9 January 1995 – 10 December 1999 | Carlos Menem |
| 110 | Federico Storani | Radical Civic Union | 10 December 1999 – 20 March 2001 | Fernando de la Rúa |
| 111 | Ramón Mestre | Radical Civic Union | 20 March 2001 – 20 December 2001 | Fernando de la Rúa |
| 112 | Rodolfo Gabrielli | Justicialist Party | 23 December 2001 – 3 May 2002 | Adolfo Rodríguez Saá |
| 112 | Rodolfo Gabrielli | Justicialist Party | 23 December 2001 – 3 May 2002 | Eduardo Duhalde |
| 113 | Jorge Matzkin | Justicialist Party | 3 May 2002 – 25 May 2003 | Eduardo Duhalde |
| 114 | Aníbal Fernández | Justicialist Party | 25 May 2003 – 10 December 2007 | Néstor Kirchner |
| 115 | Florencio Randazzo | Justicialist Party | 10 December 2007 – 6 June 2012 | Cristina Fernández de Kirchner |
Ministry of the Interior and Transport (2012–2015)
| 115 | Florencio Randazzo | Justicialist Party | 6 June 2012 – 10 December 2015 | Cristina Fernández de Kirchner |
Ministry of the Interior, Public Works and Housing (2015–2019)
| 116 | Rogelio Frigerio | MID | 10 December 2015 – 10 December 2019 | Mauricio Macri |
Ministry of the Interior (2019–2024)
| 117 | Eduardo de Pedro | Justicialist Party | 10 December 2019 – 10 December 2023 | Alberto Fernández |
| 118 | Guillermo Francos | Independent | 10 December 2023 – 27 May 2024 | Javier Milei |
Secretary of the Interior (2024–2025)
| 119 | Lisandro Catalán | Independent | 27 May 2024 – 15 September 2025 | Javier Milei |
Ministry of the Interior (2025–Present)
| 119 | Lisandro Catalán | Independent | 15 September 2025 – 31 October 2025 | Javier Milei |
| 120 | Diego Santilli | Republican Proposal | 10 November 2025 – present | Javier Milei |

== See also ==
- Ministries of the Argentine Republic
- Immigration to Argentina
