= Jorge Rodríguez (Argentine politician) =

Argentine politician

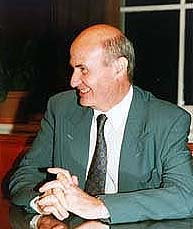

Chief of the Cabinet of Ministers
- In office 28 March 1996 – 10 December 1999
- President: Carlos Menem
- Preceded by: Eduardo Bauzá
- Succeeded by: Rodolfo Terragno

Minister of Education and Culture
- In office 4 December 1992 – 28 March 1996
- President: Carlos Menem
- Preceded by: Antonio Salonia
- Succeeded by: Susana Decibe

Personal details
- Born: 1944 (age 81–82) Coronel Hilario Lagos, Argentina
- Party: Justicialist Party
- Education: University of Buenos Aires

Jorge Alberto Rodríguez (born 1944) is an Argentine Justicialist Party politician who served as Chief of the Cabinet of Ministers and as Minister of Education during the second presidency of Carlos Menem.

== Early life ==
Rodríguez was born in 1944 in Coronel Hilario Lagos, a rural village in La Pampa Province. He became politically active in the Peronist movement as a student in the University of Buenos Aires Faculty of Agronomy and Veterinary Sciences, from which he graduated in 1971. He continued to participate in political activities until the 1976 coup d'état, later settling in the United States, where he earned a master's degree in science at the University of Nebraska–Lincoln.

== Political career ==
From 1983 to 1987, Rodríguez served as Undersecretary of Agrarian Affairs of La Pampa Province, during the governorship of Rubén Marín. Later, from 1987 to 1989, he served as the province's Minister of Education, but resigned to run for a seat in the National Chamber of Deputies.

In 1992, Rodríguez was appointed as Minister of Education and Culture of Argentina by President Carlos Menem, succeeding Antonio Salonia. In 1996, Menem appointed Rodríguez as Chief of the Cabinet of Ministers. He was the second person to serve in the post, following its creation by the 1994 constitutional amendments. Despite rumours of his intention to resign in 1997, Rodríguez remained in the position throughout the remainder of Menem's presidency, serving until December 1999.

In 2004, Rodríguez testified in the trial against fellow Menem administration secretary María Julia Alsogaray, who stood accused of corruption. Later, in 2006, Rodríguez was formally accused of embezzlement on his own, for having allegedly allowed the use of public money for a seminar conducted by a private company.

== Personal life ==
Rodríguez was married to María Susana Pangallo, with whom he has two children.

Political offices
| Preceded by Antonio Salonia | Minister of Education and Culture; 1992–1996 | Succeeded by Susana Decibe |
| Preceded by Eduardo Bauzá | Chief of the Cabinet of Ministers; 1996–1999 | Succeeded by Rodolfo Terragno |
