= Guillermo Francos =

Argentine politician (born 1950)

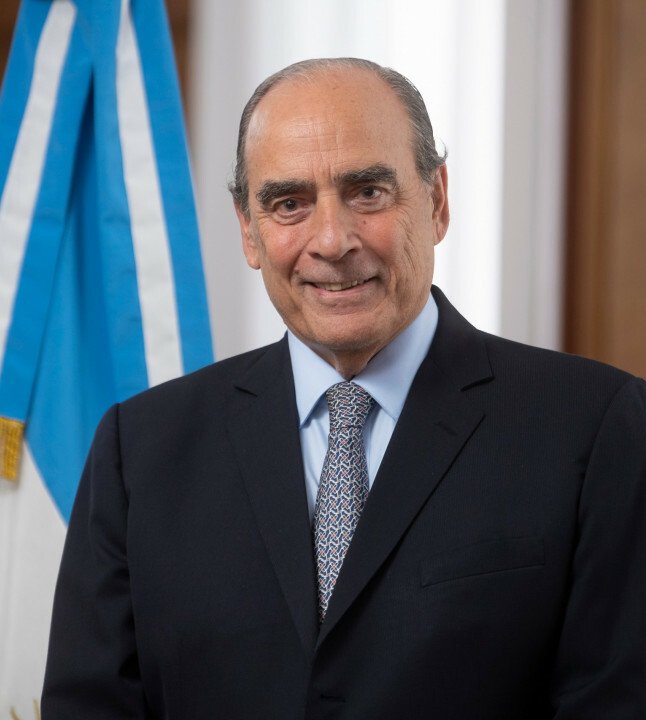
- Official portrait, 2024

Chief of the Cabinet of Ministers
- In office 27 May 2024 – 31 October 2025
- President: Javier Milei
- Preceded by: Nicolás Posse
- Succeeded by: Manuel Adorni

Minister of the Interior
- In office 10 December 2023 – 27 May 2024
- President: Javier Milei
- Preceded by: Eduardo de Pedro
- Succeeded by: Lisandro Catalán (Secretary)

Representative of Argentina to the Inter-American Development Bank
- In office 10 December 2019 – 25 September 2023
- President: Alberto Fernández
- Succeeded by: Marcelo Barg

President of the Bank of the Province of Buenos Aires
- In office 13 December 2007 – 14 December 2011
- Governor: Daniel Scioli
- Preceded by: Martín Lousteau
- Succeeded by: Gustavo Marangoni

National Deputy
- In office 10 December 1997 – 18 September 2000
- Constituency: City of Buenos Aires

Councilor of the City of Buenos Aires
- In office 10 December 1985 – 20 September 1993

Personal details
- Born: 20 April 1950 (age 76) Coronel Rosales Partido, Buenos Aires, Argentina
- Party: Independent
- Other political affiliations: Freedom Advances; Action for the Republic (1997-2007); La Libertad Avanza (since 2023)

Guillermo Alberto Francos (Spanish pronunciation: [ɡiˈʝeɾmo alˈβeɾto ˈfɾaŋkos]; born 20 April 1950) is an Argentine politician and lawyer who served as Minister of Interior for Javier Milei from December 2023 until May 2024 when he was designated Chief of Cabinet to replace Nicolás Posse.

== Biography ==
He was born in Puerto Belgrano, a base of the Argentine Navy. Guillermo Francos graduated from the Universidad del Salvador in 1974 and worked as a lawyer from 1975 to 1989. During those years he worked at the Ministry of Justice from 1974 to 1978. He worked at several places, both in the state and private organizations. He was elected national deputy in 1997 as a member of the Action for the Republic party, he resigned in September 2000, as he was appointed head of Aeropuertos Argentina 2000. He was briefly president of Aerolíneas Argentinas, and then moved to the banks. He led the Bank of the Province of Buenos Aires, Grupo Banco Provincia and Provincia Microempresas from 2007 to 2011 during the government of Daniel Scioli in Buenos Aires Province. At the same time in 2008 he was named director of Visa Argentina and later on in 2012 he was named director of Corporación América, it was in this company where he first met Javier Milei who worked as the chief economist of the corporation.

He was designated as the representative of Argentina to the Inter-American Development Bank by President Alberto Fernández in December 2019. In August 2023 he resigned from this role to join Javier Milei's campaign team, one week after the results of the 2023 Argentine primary elections were announced. The government would later designate Marcelo Barg to replace him as the representative to the IDB.

Javier Milei was elected president in 2023 and appointed him Minister of the Interior. Milei got in conflicts with the provincial governors, so Francos tried to de-escalate said conflicts. He promoted the "Pact of May" proposed during the 2024 opening of regular sessions of the National Congress of Argentina.

On 28 May 2024 he was designated Chief of Cabinet of Argentina, after the resignation of Nicolás Posse, and so left the Ministry of Interior. He resigned on 31 October 2025 and was replaced by Manuel Adorni.

Political offices
Preceded by Eduardo de Pedro	Minister of the Interior; 2023–2024	Succeeded by Lisandro Catalán as Secretary of the Interior
Preceded by Nicolás Posse	Chief of the Cabinet of Ministers; 2024–2025	Succeeded by Manuel Adorni
