= Nicolás Posse =

Argentine politician (born 1966)

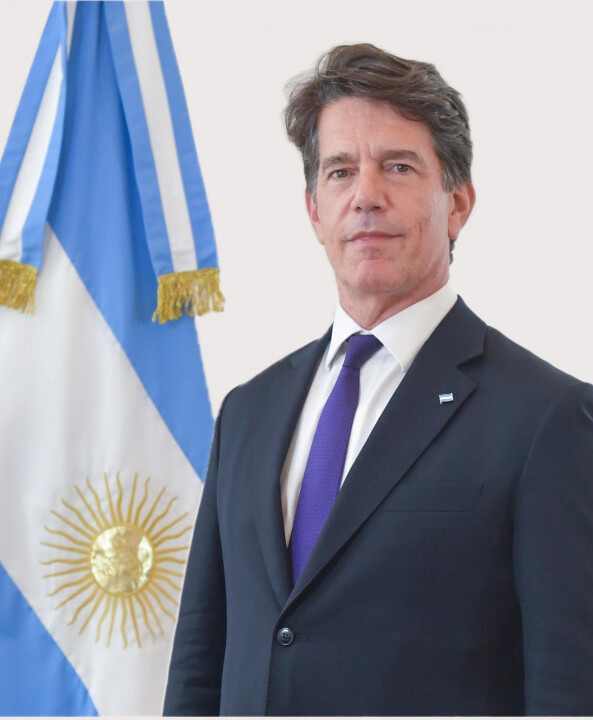
- Official portrait, 2024

Chief of the Cabinet of Ministers
- In office 10 December 2023 – 27 May 2024
- President: Javier Milei
- Preceded by: Agustín Rossi
- Succeeded by: Guillermo Francos

Personal details
- Born: 4 February 1965 (age 61) Buenos Aires, Argentina
- Party: Independent
- Other political affiliations: La Libertad Avanza
- Children: 1
- Education: ITBA; Cambridge University

Nicolás José Posse (Spanish pronunciation: [nikoˈlas xoˈse ˈpose]; born 4 February 1965) is an Argentine politician and industrial engineer who was the country's Chief of the Cabinet of Ministers from December 2023 to May 2024 under president Javier Milei. Before entering politics, Posse was an executive at Aeropuertos Argentina 2000. Posse worked in a strategic role in Javier Milei's 2023 presidential campaign.

== Early life ==
Posse attended the Instituto Tecnológico de Buenos Aires, graduating in 1989, and the University of Cambridge.

=== Business career ===
Posse began his career at Molinos Río de la Plata, before working as the CEO of duty-free sales at Aeropuertos Argentina 2000, a subset of Eduardo Eurnekian's Corporación América. Posse also was head of project management in the "Aconcagua Bioceanic Corridor" between 2009 and 2017, an initiative to link the Atlantic and Pacific oceans through a high-tech railway corridor. During this project, he met Javier Milei.

== Political career ==
Since July 2023, within the framework of the presidential elections, Posse took unpaid leave to dedicate himself fully to the presidential campaign of Javier Milei, candidate of La Libertad Avanza. In the libertarian campaign, Posse was in charge of leading the technical teams of La Libertad Avanza. After Milei's electoral victory, Posse coordinated the transition and was present at the first meeting between president-elect Milei and outgoing president Alberto Fernández at Quinta de Olivos to discuss the transfer of command.

=== Chief of Staff ===
On 10 December 2023, he assumed office as Cabinet Chief of the Nation. He resigned on 27 May 2024, being replaced by the former Minister of the Interior, Guillermo Francos.

== Personal life ==
Posse is married and has one daughter.

Posse is a mountaineer, climbing Aconcagua several times, and has run marathons.

Political offices
| Preceded by Agustín Rossi | Chief of the Cabinet of Ministers; 2023–2024 | Succeeded by Guillermo Francos |
