= Juan Carlos Pugliese =

Argentine politician

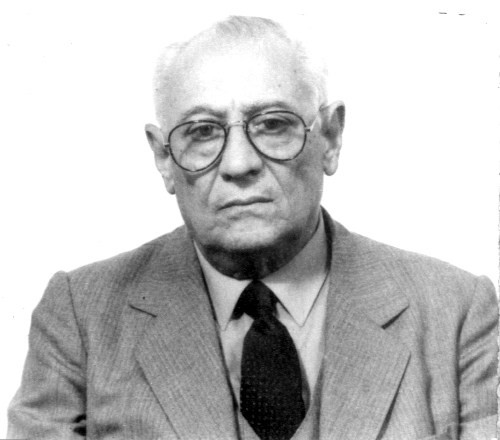
Juan Carlos Pugliese (1985)

Juan Carlos Pugliese (1915–1994) was an Argentine politician. He served as minister of interior and minister of economy during the presidency of Raúl Alfonsín.

Political offices
Vacant Military dictatorship Title last held by Nicasio Sánchez Toranzo	President of the Chamber of Deputies; 1983–1989	Succeeded by Leopoldo Moreau
Preceded by Juan Vital Sourrouille	Minister of Economy; 1989	Succeeded by Jesús Rodríguez
Preceded by Enrique Nosiglia	Minister of the Interior; 1989	Succeeded by Eduardo Bauzá
