= Borlenghi =

Borlenghi is a surname. Notable people with the surname include:

- Ángel Borlenghi (1904–1962), Argentine labor leader and politician
- Matt Borlenghi (born 1967), Italian-American actor
