= FYL =

FYL or FyL may refer to:

- FyL, abbreviation for Federalismo y liberación (Federalism and liberation), a faction within Argentina's Justicialist Party established by Eduardo Bauzá
- FYL, abbreviation for Fyllingen BBK, a Norwegian football team in the 1993 Tippeligaen
- FYL, abbreviation for Fylkir, Icelandic sports club
- Fuck Your Lyfe, brand founded by American rapper Gorilla Nems
- FYL, 2020 single by South Korean record producer duo GroovyRoom
- FYL, abbreviation for FK Fyllingsdalen, Norwegian sports club
- FYL, abbreviation for AFC Fylde, English football club
- Fostering Young Lives, 2009 program by the Benevolent Society, Australian charitable organization
