= Nosiglia =

Nosiglia is a surname. Notable people with the surname include:

- Cesare Nosiglia (1944–2025), Italian Roman Catholic archbishop
- Enrique Nosiglia (born 1949), Argentine politician

== See also ==
- Nociglia, a town and comune in the Italian province of Lecce
