= Humberto Schiavoni =

Argentine lawyer and politician

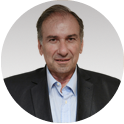

National Senator
- Incumbent
- Assumed office 10 December 2017
- Constituency: Misiones

Chief of the Cabinet of Ministers
- In office 21 December 2001 – 23 December 2001
- President: Ramón Puerta
- Preceded by: Chrystian Colombo
- Succeeded by: Jorge Obeid

Personal details
- Born: July 16, 1958 (age 67) Posadas, Misiones Province, Argentina
- Party: Integration and Development Movement (1982–1991); Republican Proposal (2012–present)
- Spouse: Daniela García

Humberto Schiavoni (born 10 July 1958) is an Argentine lawyer and politician. He is National Senator for Misiones province and he leads Republican Proposal in the upper house of National Congress of Argentina.

== Biography ==
He was born in Posadas, Misiones. He graduated as a lawyer at the University of Buenos Aires.

== Political career ==
In 1983 he returns to Misiones after graduation and starts his political activism in the Integration and Development Movement (MID).

In 1987 MID appeared in the provincial Missions elections in an alliance with the Justicialist Party. The formula Julio César Humada (PJ) - José Piro (MID) wins the election and two years later Schiavoni is appointed Undersecretary of Economics. Its management carried out deep economic reforms in tune with the government of Carlos Menem: the Bank of Missions, the Insurance Institute, and Missionary Paper were privatized; In some locations, the drinking water and sewer service was concessioned, and a hydroelectric dam was put into operation under a private concession.

The following elections (1991 and 1995) are also won by the PJ, with Ramón Puerta as candidate. Under his government, Schiavoni joins the peronism and was appointed Minister of Economy and Public Works between 1998 and 1999

Then he was the Cabinet Coordinating Minister of the new peronist Missions Governor, Carlos Rovira.

On December 21, 2001, after the resignation of President Fernando de la Rúa, he was appointed by Ramón Puerta, as Chief of the Cabinet of Ministers for two days.

Schiavoni is appointed president of the Yacyretá Binational Entity, between 2002 and 2003 under the presidency of Eduardo Duhalde.

Between 2005 and 2007 he was elected Councilor of the city of Posadas.

After the election of Mauricio Macri as Chief of Government of Buenos Aires in 2007, Schiavoni is appointed director of the Corporation Buenos Aires Sur S.E., until 2015.

In 2012, he was elected President of the National Council of PRO and Macri charged him with the mission of organizing a Republican Proposal nationwide until 2020.

After the assumption of Macri as president of the Nation, Schiavoni is again appointed to the Yacyretá Binational Entity until 2017.

== National senator ==
In 2017 he was elected as National Senator by the province of Misiones by Republican Proposal.
