= 2024 opening of regular sessions of the National Congress of Argentina =

Argentine government ceremony

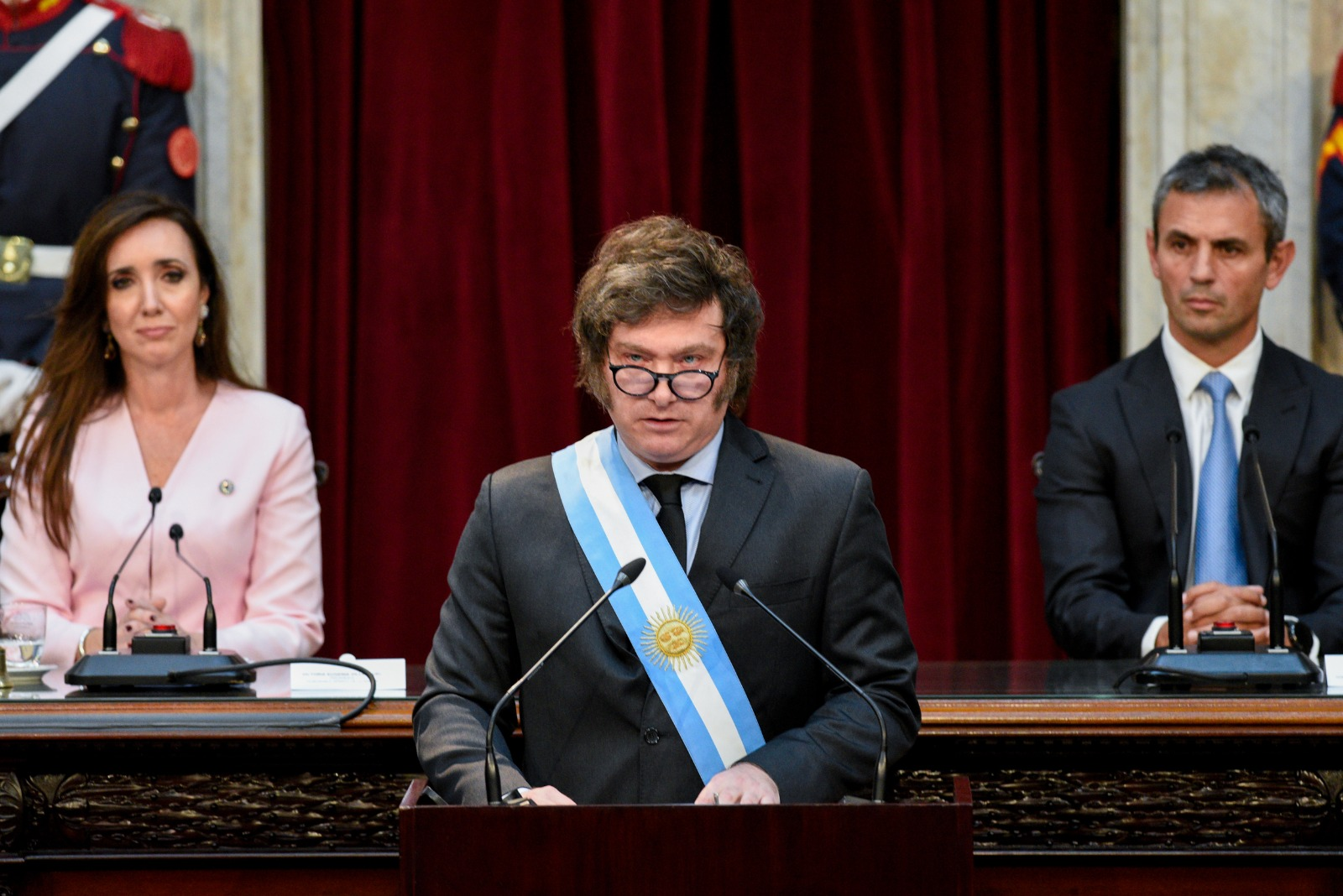
- Date: 1 March 2024
- Venue: National Congress of Argentina
- Location: Buenos Aires
- Type: Opening of regular sessions of the National Congress of Argentina
- Participants: Javier Milei

The 2024 opening of regular sessions of the National Congress of Argentina took place on 1 March 2024. It was a speech delivered by president Javier Milei at the National Congress of Argentina.

== Organization ==
The security was managed by the federal police, the police of Buenos Aires, and the military house (the military group tasked with the security of the President of Argentina). The streets around and in the vicinity of the Palace of the National Congress were closed at 17:30. Although they are not in the immediate vicinity, there were security operations at Av. Corrientes, Leandro N. Alem, Paseo Colón, Junín and Belgrano. Line A of the Buenos Aires Metro, which travels below the Congress building, had limited service during the ceremony.

Mayor Jorge Macri opened the regular sessions of the Buenos Aires City Legislature on the same day, at 09:00. Governor Axel Kicillof of the Buenos Aires Province was scheduled to do the same as well but moved the local ceremony to the following Monday.

Milei left the Casa Rosada at 20:35 and traveled to the Congress with most of his cabinet. He was received by vice president Victoria Villarruel and the president of the Chamber of Deputies, Martín Menem.

== Contents and delivery ==
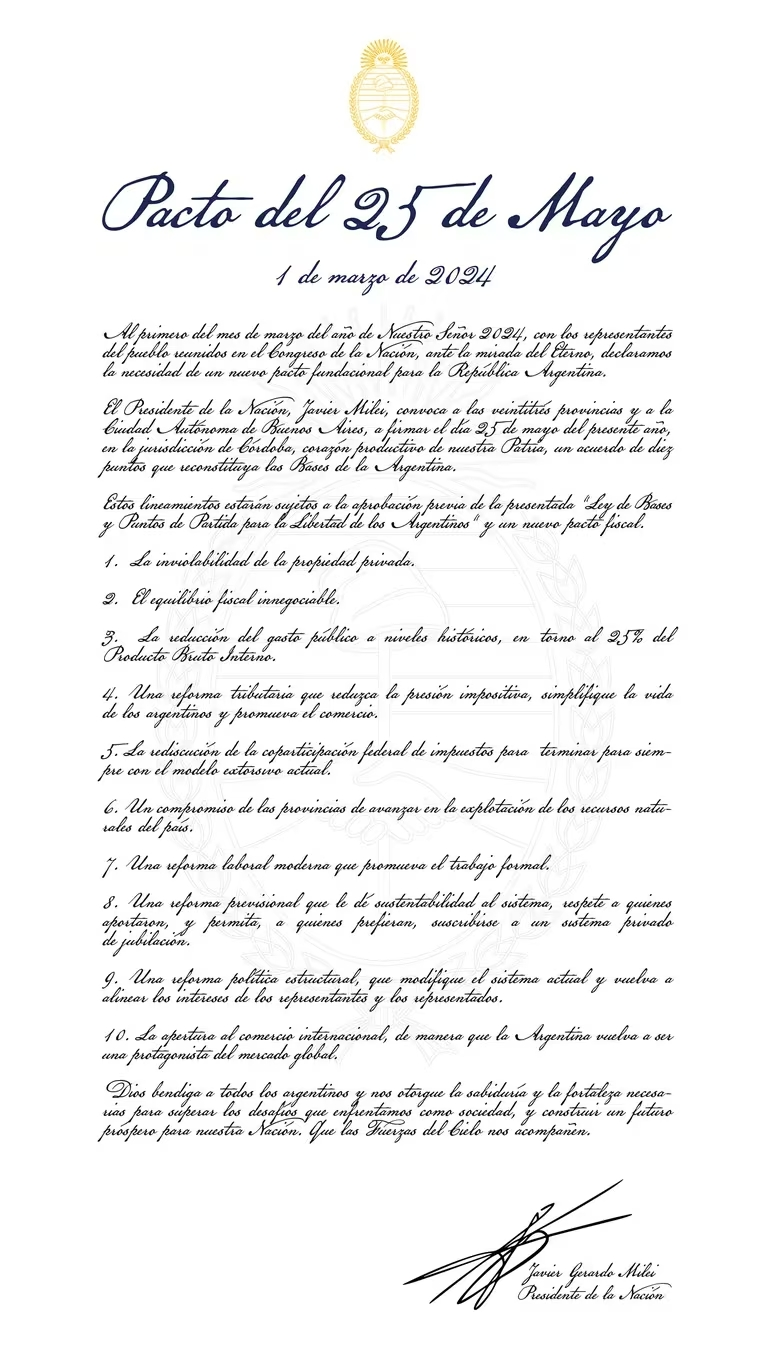
Handwritten text of the Pact of May

Contrary to tradition, the ceremony was held at 21:00, instead of noon. Presidential spokesman Manuel Adorni stated the ceremony was held beyond usual working hours to ensure that most people would be able to watch it. The ceremony was broadcast jointly (Cadena nacional) across various networks and media.

In the speech Milei criticised the presidency of Alberto Fernández, which he defined as an economic disaster, "an orgy of public spending, out-of-control financial emission, and the worst legacy ever received by any government". He also criticized the unions. He promised to take action against the dominant political groups, such as removing the privileged retirement benefits for presidents and vice-president. He also warned that, even if Congress did not approve the bills he proposed, he would implement his proposed policies anyway. This comment was in reference to an omnibus law bill that the Congress had rejected the previous month. He said, "We won't back down; we're going to keep pushing forward." [...] Whether that's by law, presidential decree, or by modifying regulations. We are going to change the country for good... with or without the support of political leaders, with all the legal resources of the executive".

Milei started his government implementing huge fiscal austerity measures, reducing state spending, which he considers the cause of the dramatic inflation of the country. During the speech, he proposed penalties for anyone, even the president of Argentina, who authorized the financing of the fiscal deficit by printing money. He said that "If we don't change the economic model from the very roots, then Argentina has no future".

He also proposed the Pact of the 25 of May (named after the First National Government national day of Argentina), with ten basic premises that the governors of provinces were invited to agree upon and to support related bills that would seek to enact reforms. He also proposed to amend the current system that distributes the money from taxes between the federal and provincial governments. The proposals are:

1. The inviolability of private property.
2. The non-negotiable fiscal balance.
3. The reduction of public spending to historical levels, around 25% of the Gross Domestic Product.
4. A tax reform that reduces tax pressure, simplifies the lives of Argentines and promotes trade.
5. The rediscussion of federal tax sharing to end forever the current extortionate model.
6. A commitment by the provinces to advance the exploitation of the country's natural resources.
7. A modern labour reform that promotes formal work.
8. A pension reform that gives sustainability to the system, respects those who contributed, and allows those who prefer to subscribe to a private retirement system.
9. A structural political reform that modifies the current system and realigns the interests of the representatives and those represented.
10. The opening to international trade so that Argentina once again becomes a protagonist in the global market.

== Responses ==
The speech drew protests outside of Congress. Several piquetero organizations and left-wing groups organized demonstrations at Congress, at the time of Milei's speech. Gabriel Solano said "We'll be there with a big demonstration and a massive cacerolazo to manifest our rejection of this war plan that the government wages against the working class". Security minister Patricia Bullrich reported that there were 803 complaints of people forced to join those demonstrations, and that some of them were instructed to attend it armed with sticks and to jump the security perimeters.
