= Lisandro Catalán =

Argentine politician (born 1971)

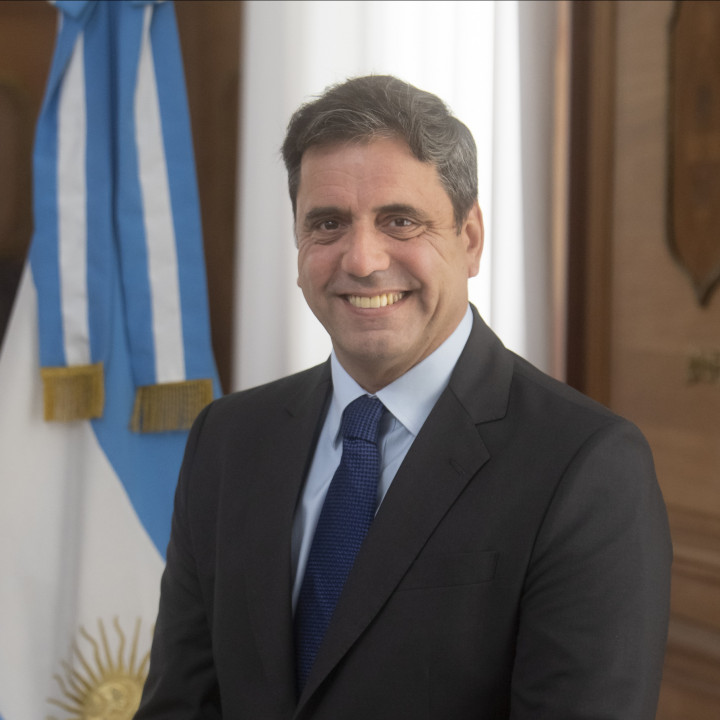
- Catalán in 2024

Minister of the Interior
- In office 14 September 2025 – 31 October 2025
- President: Javier Milei
- Preceded by: Guillermo Francos
- Succeeded by: Diego Santilli

Personal details
- Born: 1971 (age 54–55)
- Party: La Libertad Avanza
- Parent: Juan José Catalán (father)

Lisandro Catalán (Spanish pronunciation: [liˈsandɾo kataˈlan]; born 1971) is an Argentine politician who served as minister of the interior from September 2025 until his resignation in October 2025. He is the son of Juan José Catalán.

Political offices
| Preceded by Guillermo Francos as Minister of the Interior | Secretary of the Interior; 2024–2025 | Succeeded by Himself as Minister of the Interior |
| Preceded by Himself as Secretary of the Interior | Minister of the Interior; September 2025–October 2025 | Succeeded by Diego Santilli |
