= Agustín Rossi =

Argentine politician (born 1959)

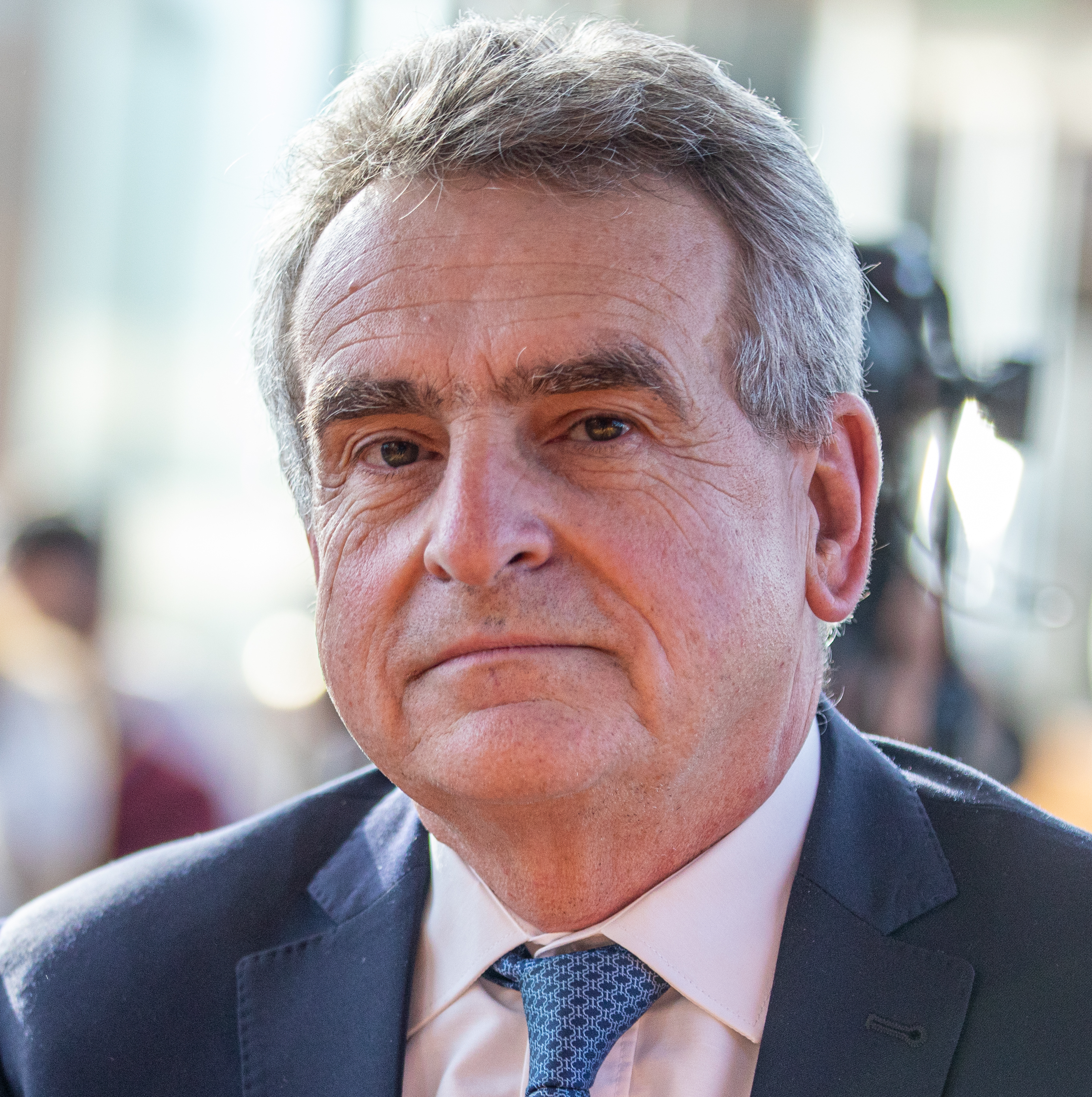
- Rossi in 2023

Chief of the Cabinet of Ministers
- In office 15 February 2023 – 10 December 2023
- President: Alberto Fernández
- Preceded by: Juan Luis Manzur
- Succeeded by: Nicolás Posse

Minister of Defense
- In office 10 December 2019 – 10 August 2021
- President: Alberto Fernández
- Preceded by: Oscar Aguad
- Succeeded by: Jorge Taiana
- In office 3 June 2013 – 10 December 2015
- President: Cristina Fernández de Kirchner
- Preceded by: Arturo Puricelli
- Succeeded by: Julio Martínez

National Deputy
- In office 10 December 2017 – 10 December 2019
- Constituency: Santa Fe
- In office 10 December 2005 – 3 June 2013
- Constituency: Santa Fe

Personal details
- Born: 18 October 1959 (age 67) Vera, Santa Fe, Argentina
- Party: Justicialist Party
- Other political affiliations: Front for Victory (2003–2017); Unidad Ciudadana (2017–2019); Frente de Todos (2019–2023); Union for the Homeland (since 2023)
- Spouse: María Raquel Pezzelato
- Children: 4
- Education: National University of Rosario
- Profession: Civil engineer
- Nickname: Chivo

Agustín Oscar Rossi (Spanish pronunciation: [a.ɣusˈtin osˈkaɾ ˈro.si]; born 18 October 1959) is an Argentine Justicialist Party politician. Rossi has held a number of important political posts throughout his career, most notably as Minister of Defense during the presidencies of Cristina Fernández de Kirchner (2013–2015) and Alberto Fernández (2019–2021).

Rossi was a National Deputy for his native Santa Fe, and served as leader of the Front for Victory parliamentary bloc in the lower house. Since 15 February 2023, Rossi has been Chief of the Cabinet of Ministers to the incumbent president Alberto Fernandez. He was the running mate of Sergio Massa in the 2023 Argentine general election, seeking the vice presidency as part of the Union for the Homeland coalition until Massa lost to Javier Milei in the runoff.

== Early life and education ==
Rossi was born in Vera, a small city in the north of Santa Fe Province, where he spent his early years. He moved to Rosario when he was 17 years old, and graduated as a civil engineer at the National University of Rosario.

== Political career ==
=== Provincial career ===
Rossi was a member of the Peronist University Youth in the 1970s, and joined the Justicialist Party in the 1980s. He was elected to the Rosario Deliberative Council in 1987, but returned to his private practice in 1991. He returned to politics in 2001, was elected to the Deliberative Council in 2002, and presided over said body from 2004 to 2005.

In the 2005 legislative elections he ran for a seat in the Lower House of Congress for the Front for Victory, the largest faction of the Justicialist Party, formed by supporters of President Néstor Kirchner. His campaign capitalized on, and was centred on gaining support for, the successful policies implemented by Kirchner on the national level; Rossi, who was not yet well known in the province, presented himself as "Kirchner's candidate." The Front for Victory party list headed by Rossi came in second (with 33% of votes) after the Socialist Party list headed by Hermes Binner (43%).

=== Congressional terms and Ministry of Defense ===
He then became the head of the Front for Victory bloc in the lower house of Congress. In that capacity, he took on the task of imposing party discipline while rallying legislative support of Kirchner's policies; he stated that "the bloc [belonging to the ruling party] has the fundamental role of being the legislative arm of the government. I cannot conceive a [government party] block that has doubts or criticism for the government's projects. Society tells us: 'I choose you to strengthen the course of action initiated by the President." He also courted controversy with his rhetoric, notably in August 2010 when he described lawmakers who presented a bill that sought to reverse a government decision to revoke an expired license for the Fibertel internet service provider, as "lawyers" for the Clarín Group (Fibertel's parent company); there have been ongoing controversies between Clarín and Kirchnerism since 2008 over a number of issues.

Rossi was a candidate in the FpV primary for the governorship of Santa Fe in the 2007 elections. His rival within the party was Rosario-born National Deputy and former Foreign Relations Minister Rafael Bielsa. The Mayor of Rafaela, Omar Perotti, campaigned for some time as well, but finally gave up and turned to support Bielsa. In the classical caudillist fashion that has prevailed in Argentina’s last century of politics, although some in the party, including Bielsa, would have rather negotiated on a consensus candidacy, Rossi insisted on conducting a primary election. Rossi also stated that he wanted Bielsa's sister María Eugenia (then vice-governor of Santa Fe) on his party list, though he instead chose Jorge Fernández, former Minister of Education during the governorship of Víctor Reviglio. Bielsa was eventually chosen as the party's candidate in primary elections on July 1, 2007, but subsequently lost the election to Socialist Hermes Binner.

Rossi continued in his role as Majority Leader of the Chamber of Deputies as head of the Front for Victory bloc, which retained a majority in the Chamber. President Cristina Fernández de Kirchner nominated him to the post of Minister of Defence of Argentina on 30 May 2013.

== Electoral history ==
=== Executive ===
Electoral history of Agustín Rossi
Election	Office	List	Votes			Result	Ref.
Election	Office	List	Total	%	P.	Result	Ref.
2007 (P)	Governor of Santa Fe	Plural Concertation	228,501	34.96% (Note: Percentage out of the votes received by the party or front within which the primary was contested.)	2nd (Note: Out of the lists contesting the primary.)	Not elected	
2011	Governor of Santa Fe	Santa Fe for All	388,231	22.76%	3rd	Not elected	
2023 1-R	Vice President of Argentina	Union for the Homeland	9,853,492	36.78%	1st	→ Round 2	
2023 2-R	Vice President of Argentina	Union for the Homeland	11,384,014	44.25%	2nd	Not elected	

=== Legislative ===
Electoral history of Agustín Rossi
Election	Office	List	#	District	Votes			Result	Ref.
Election	Office	List	#	District	Total	%	P.	Result	Ref.
2005	National Deputy	Front for Victory	1	Santa Fe Province	489,584	33.28%	2nd (Note: Presented on an electoral list. The data shown represents the share of the vote the entire party/alliance received in that constituency.)	Elected	
2009	National Deputy	Front for Victory	1	Santa Fe Province	162,615	9.63%	3rd	Elected	
2015	Mercosur MP	Front for Victory	3	National list	8,922,609	37.46%	1st	Elected	
2017	National Deputy	Justicialist Front	1	Santa Fe Province	509,190	25.90%	2nd	Elected	
