= Chrystian Colombo =

Argentine politician

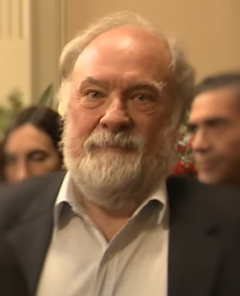

Chief of the Cabinet of Ministers
- In office 6 October 2000 – 21 December 2001
- President: Fernando de la Rúa
- Preceded by: Rodolfo Terragno
- Succeeded by: Humberto Schiavoni

President of the Banco de la Nación Argentina
- In office 1999 – 6 October 2000
- Preceded by: Roque Maccarone
- Succeeded by: Enrique Olivera

Personal details
- Born: 1952 (age 73–74) Zapala, Argentina
- Party: Radical Civic Union
- Education: Pontifical Catholic University of Argentina

Chrystian Gabriel Colombo (born 1952) is an Argentine businessman and politician who served as Chief of the Cabinet of Ministers during the presidency of Fernando de la Rúa, from 2000 to 2001. He served as cabinet chief during the December 2001 riots, and resigned alongside De la Rúa in their aftermath.

== Early life ==
Colombo was born in 1952 in Zapala, Neuquén Province. He graduated with a licenciatura degree on economics from the Pontifical Catholic University of Argentina (UCA).

== Political career ==
During the presidency of Raúl Alfonsín, in June 1985, Colombo was appointed as president of the Banco Nacional de Desarrollo (BANADE), in replacement of Mario Brodersohn. Later, Colombo worked in the private sector as part of Gupo Pérez Companc, as a stockbroker in the Buenos Aires Stock Exchange, as vice president of the Sociedad de la Bolsa Macro, and as manager of the Banco Río de la Plata (later Banco Santander Río) stock market.

In 1999, upon the election of Fernando de la Rúa as president of Argentina, Colombo was appointed as president of the Banco de la Nación Argentina, the country's national bank. Just a year later, on 6 October 2000, De la Rúa appointed Colombo as Chief of the Cabinet of Ministers, in replacement of Rodolfo Terragno. Under Colombo's leadership, Ricardo López Murphy was designated at the helm of the Ministry of Economy following the resignation of José Luis Machinea. Colombo was also investigated for embezzlement of public funds diverted from the Banco Nación and to the private-owned Banco Macro. In 2001, he was denounced by the Anti-Corruption Bureau for mishandling of public funds during his time as president of the Banco Nación; further charges were presented before the National Senate in 2002.

Colombo remained in the position until De la Rúa's abrupt resignation on 20 December 2001, and was the last public official to leave the Casa Rosada in the aftermath of the December 2001 riots. Due to Senate provisional president (and acting president) Ramón Puerta being in San Luis at the time, Colombo managed "security and minimal administrative affairs of the State until the situation was resolved" in the early hours of 21 December.

== Personal life ==
Colombo is married to visual artist Silvia Rivas.

Political offices
Preceded by Rodolfo Terragno	Chief of the Cabinet of Ministers; 2000–2001	Succeeded by Humberto Schiavoni
