= Rodolfo Terragno =

Argentine lawyer and politician

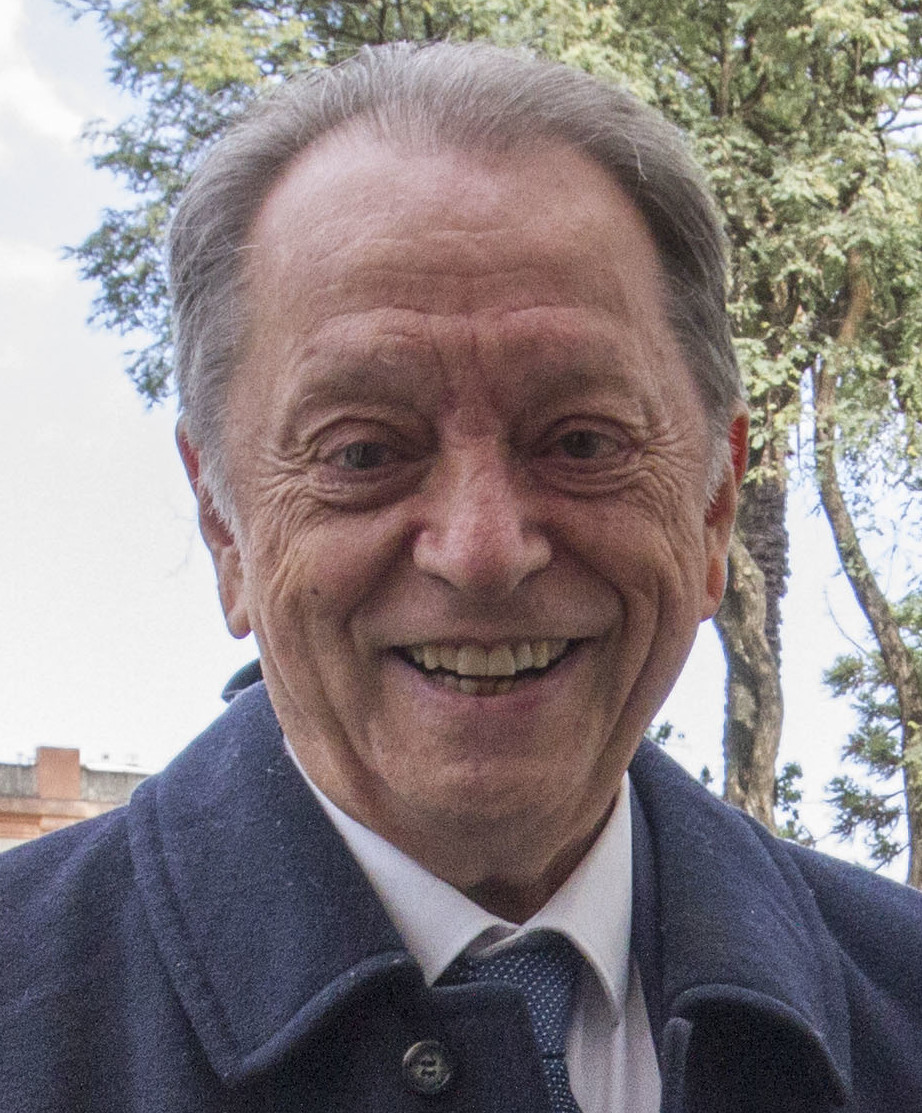
- Terragno in 2019

Argentine Ambassador to UNESCO
- In office 3 February 2016 – 10 December 2019
- Preceded by: Miguel Ángel Estrella
- Succeeded by: Fernando Solanas

National Senator
- In office 10 December 2001 – 10 December 2007
- Constituency: City of Buenos Aires

Chief of the Cabinet of Ministers
- In office 10 December 1999 – 6 October 2000
- President: Fernando de la Rúa
- Preceded by: Jorge Rodríguez
- Succeeded by: Chrystian Colombo

President of the National Committee of the Radical Civic Union
- In office 1995–1997
- Preceded by: Raúl Alfonsín
- Succeeded by: Fernando De la Rúa

National Deputy
- In office 10 December 1993 – 10 December 1999
- Constituency: City of Buenos Aires

Minister of Public Works and Services
- In office 16 September 1987 – 26 May 1989
- President: Raúl Alfonsín
- Preceded by: Pedro Trucco
- Succeeded by: Roberto Pedro Echarte

Personal details
- Born: 16 November 1943 (age 82) Buenos Aires, Argentina
- Party: Radical Civic Union
- Education: University of Buenos Aires
- Profession: Lawyer

Rodolfo Terragno (born 16 November 1943) is an Argentine politician and lawyer, former Senator and journalist. From 2016 to 2019, he was Argentina's ambassador to UNESCO.

== Life and times ==
Terragno was born in Buenos Aires, Argentina, in 1943 and obtained a law degree from the University of Buenos Aires in 1967, founding the law firm of Terragno & Associates. He married Sonia Pascual Sánchez, with whom he had two children. He became a prestigious journalist, appointed editor-in-chief for the newsmagazine Confirmado between 1967 and 1968, was a columnist for La Opinión newspaper, and an editor in Cuestionario magazine. Terragno became adjunct professor of law at his alma mater in 1973. Intimidation by the dictatorship installed in 1976 led to his exile in Caracas, where he became editor-in-chief of El Diario de Caracas. In 1980, he was appointed researcher for the Institute of Latin American Studies in London and for the London School of Economics, posts he held until 1982. He remained in London as editor-in-chief of Letters, until 1987.

Affiliated to the centrist Radical Civic Union since 1961, he was appointed Minister of Public Works by President Raúl Alfonsín in 1987, whereby he initiated a modest program of privatizations. Terragno received the Ordre National du Mérite from French President François Mitterrand, in 1987. Elected Congressman in 1993, he campaigned against the Olivos Pact negotiated between UCR leader Raúl Alfonsín and President Carlos Menem, who sought the deal in a bid to amend the Argentine Constitution to allow himself reelection. He sought the UCR's vice-presidential nomination in a ticket with Federico Storani, but was defeated by Alfonsín's choice: Río Negro Province Governor Horacio Massaccesi. Loyal to the struggling UCR, he agreed to be Massaccesi's Chief of Staff-designate in March, a move that did not stave off defeat in the May 1995 elections.

Out of Congress, he sought and won election as President of the UCR, helping negotiate a successful alliance with the center-left Frepaso. The Alliance's victory in the 1997 midterm elections paved the way for their victory in 1999. Terragno resigned from Congress to accept the influential post of Chief of the Cabinet of Ministers for President Fernando de la Rúa, though fallout over a bribery scandal involving the President led to his resignation in October 2000. He was elected Senator for Buenos Aires in 2001 and served until 2007, by which time he sat on a splinter UCR ticket. Terragno began efforts to join Vice President Julio Cobos (a popular UCR figure distanced from the President, Cristina Kirchner) in an alliance with ARI leader Elisa Carrió in January 2009, though no agreement was reached.

== Selected publications ==
- La Simulación (2005)
- El Peronismo de los '70 (2005)
- Falklands/Malvinas (2002)
- Maitland & San Martín (1998)
- Bases para un Modelo de Crecimiento, Empleo y Bienestar (1996)
- El Nuevo Modelo (1994)
- Proyecto 95 (1993)
- La Argentina del Siglo 21 (1985)
- The Challenge of Real Development (1987).
- Muerte y Resurrección de los Políticos (1981)
- Memorias del Presente (1984)
- Contratapas (1976)
- Los 400 Días de Perón (1974)
- Los Dueños del Poder (1972)
