= Diego Santilli =

Argentine accountant and politician

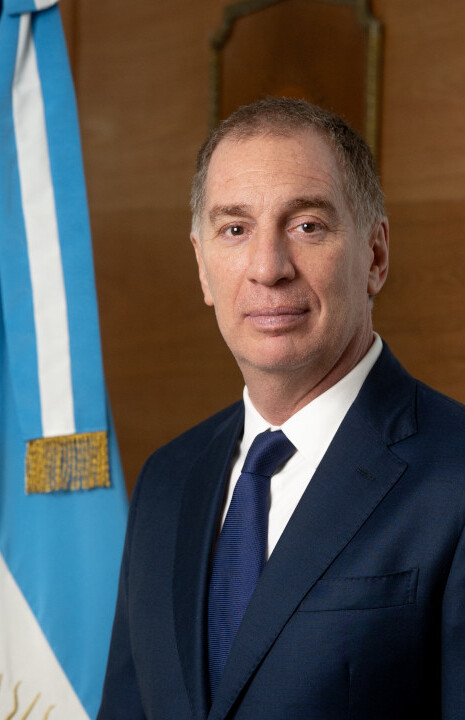
- Official portrait, 2025

Chief of the Cabinet of Ministers
- Incumbent
- Assumed office 28 June 2026
- President: Javier Milei
- Preceded by: Manuel Adorni

Minister of the Interior
- In office 10 November 2025 – 28 June 2026
- President: Javier Milei
- Preceded by: Lisandro Catalán
- Succeeded by: Gustavo Coria

National Deputy
- In office 10 December 2021 – 10 November 2025
- Constituency: Buenos Aires
- In office 9 October 2002 – 10 December 2003
- Constituency: City of Buenos Aires

National Senator
- In office 10 December 2013 – 10 December 2015
- Constituency: City of Buenos Aires
Local offices
Deputy Chief of Government of Buenos Aires
In office 9 December 2015 – 22 July 2021
Mayor	Horacio Rodríguez Larreta
Preceded by	María Eugenia Vidal
Succeeded by	Clara Muzzio (2023)
Minister of Justice and Security of the City of Buenos Aires
In office 26 November 2018 – 22 July 2021
Mayor	Horacio Rodríguez Larreta
Preceded by	Martín Ocampo
Minister for the Environment and Public Areas of the City of Buenos Aires
In office 10 December 2009 – 9 December 2013
Mayor	Mauricio Macri
Preceded by	Juan Pablo Piccardo
Succeeded by	Edgardo Cenzón
Legislator of the City of Buenos Aires
In office 10 December 2003 – 10 December 2009

Personal details
- Born: Diego César Santilli; 6 April 1967 (age 59) Buenos Aires, Argentina
- Party: Republican Proposal
- Profession: Accountant
- Website: Official Blog

Diego César Santilli (Spanish pronunciation: [ˈdjeɣo ˈsesaɾ sanˈtili]; born 6 April 1967) is an Argentine accountant and politician. A member of the political coalition La Libertad Avanza, Santilli has served in a number of posts in the Buenos Aires city government, most notably as Deputy Deputy Chief of Government (deputy mayor) under Horacio Rodríguez Larreta from 2015 to 2021.

== Early life ==
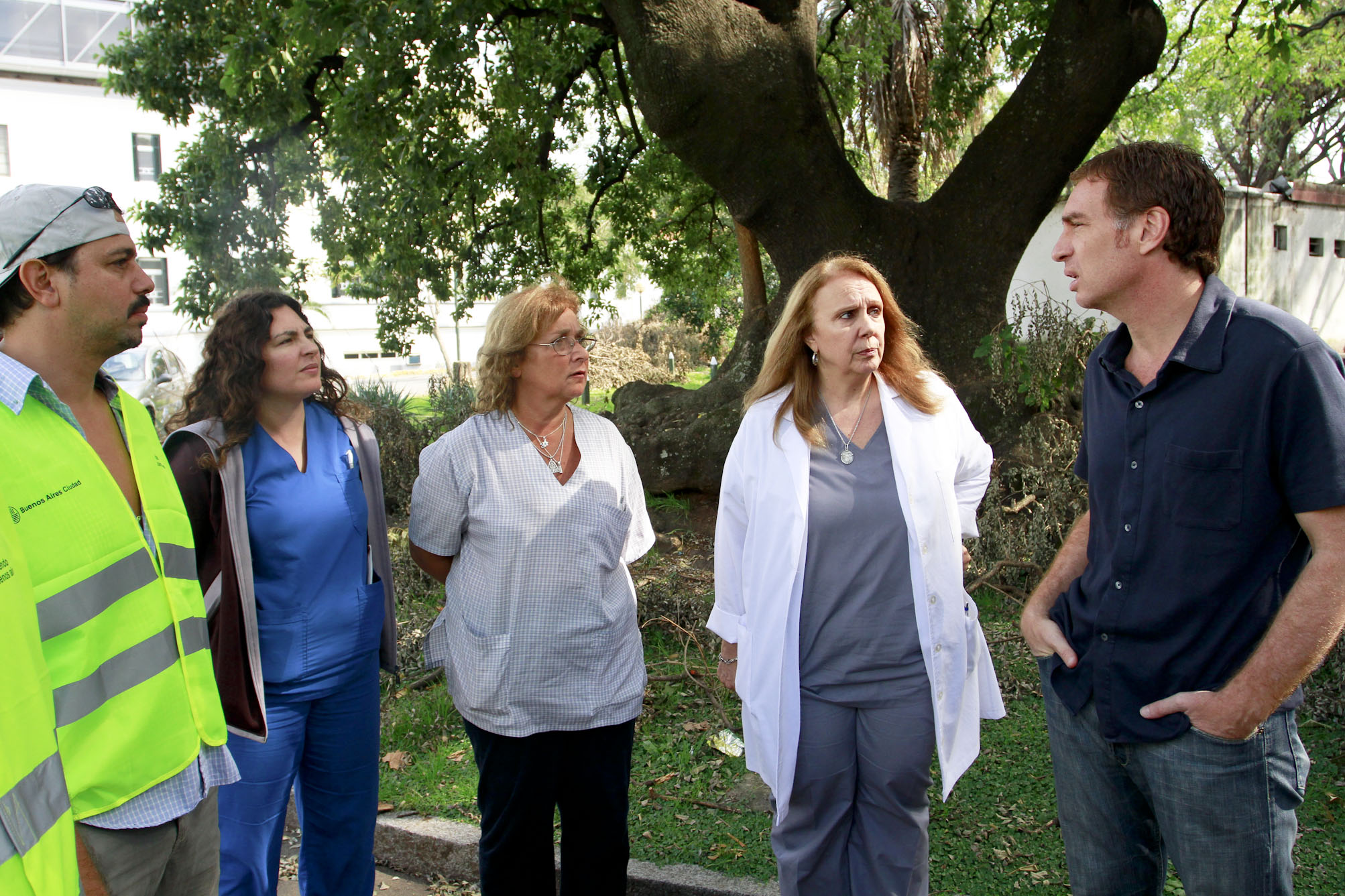
Santilli with neighbours of Buenos Aires

Diego César Santilli was born in the neighborhood of Palermo, Buenos Aires on April 6, 1967, within a family of Italian origin. He is son of the former president of River Plate and Banco Nación, Hugo Santilli. His mother María Luisa Forchieri, is a tarotologist.

He attended Saint Augustine School and received his degree in accountancy at the age of 23 from the Faculty of Economic Sciences at the University of Buenos Aires; he also pursued marketing studies at the University of California, Berkeley.

== Political career ==
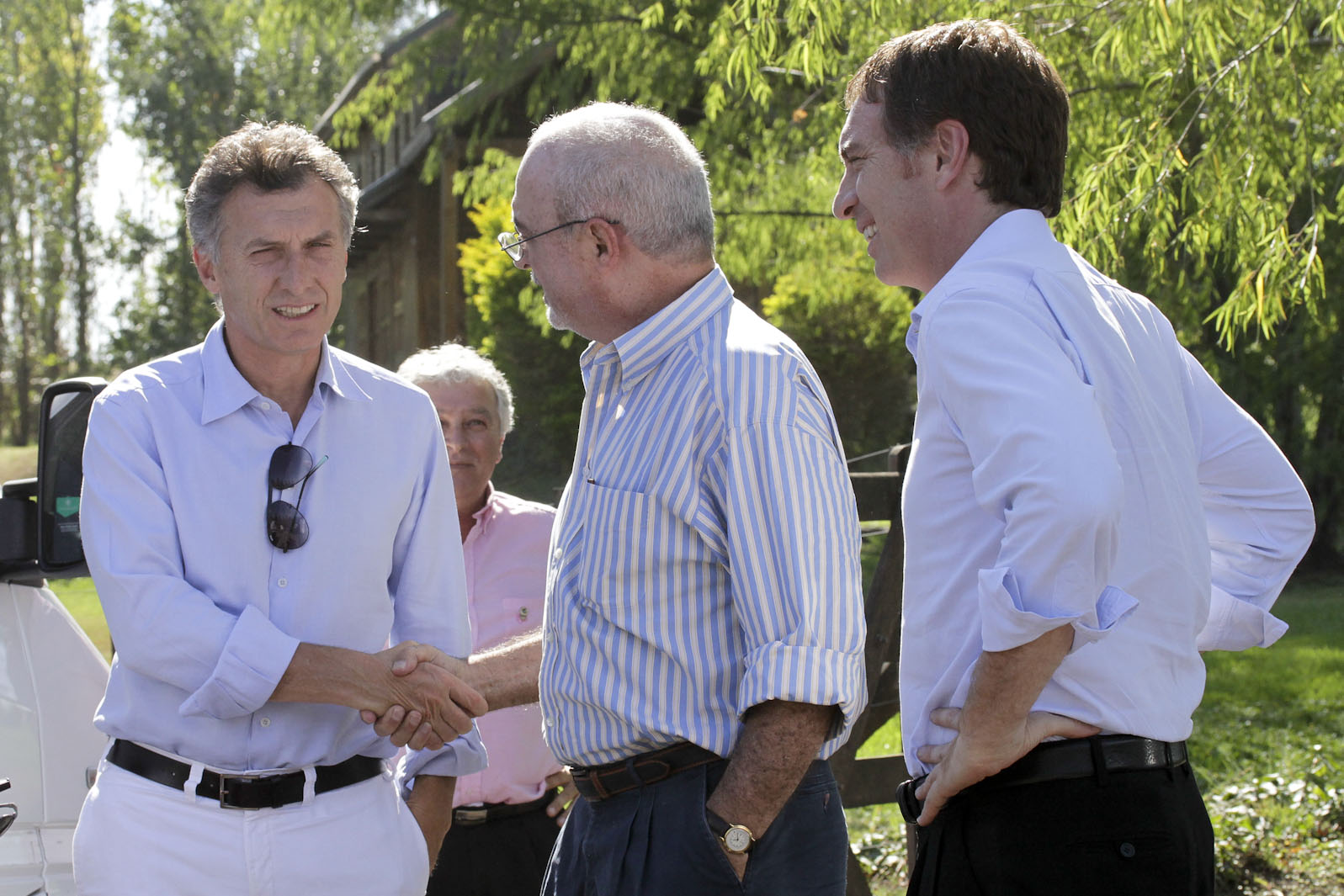
Santilli with mayor Mauricio Macri

Diego Santilli has held several public offices in Buenos Aires City, the most important being manager of the Buenos Aires City Bank and vice president of the City Legislature, elected in 2003. From 2009 to 2013 he served as Minister of Environment and Public Spaces of the City of Buenos Aires. He is coordinator of Asociación Buenos Aires en RED and, together with his wife, founder of CANI (Food Culture for an Intelligent, Responsible and Safe Nutrition). In 2008 he wrote a children's book in order to raise awareness about the importance of following traffic norms.

In 2013, he was elected National Senator for the City of Buenos Aires; he was second in Republican Proposal's list, under Gabriela Michetti. Both Michetti and Santilli went on to leave the Senate to assume office in executive branches before the end of their term.

=== Deputy Chief of Government ===
In 2015, shortly after taking office as Senator, he resigned from this position after Horacio Rodríguez Larreta publicly asked him to be his running mate in that year's mayoral election. In the first round, the Larreta-Santilli PRO ticket achieved a lead of approximately 20 percentage points over their rival, Martín Lousteau of the ECO coalition. As no ticket surpassed the 50% threshold, a runoff was held on 19 July. The PRO ticket won by a narrow margin, with 51.64% of the vote against Lousteau's 48.36%, electing Rodríguez Larreta and Santilli as Chief and Deputy Chief of Government, respectively.

In June 2019, Rodríguez Larreta announced that they would run together again for re-election. This decision meant Santilli would be ineligible to run for the top office in the 2023 election, as he would be seeking a second term as vice mayor. He ultimately confirmed his candidacy. In October 2019, the Larreta-Santilli ticket was victorious in the first round, avoiding a runoff by securing 55.9% of the vote. Their main opponent, Matías Lammens of the Frente de Todos, obtained 35%.

=== Congressman ===
In 2021, he ran for a seat in the Chamber of Deputies in the Juntos por el Cambio list in Buenos Aires Province.

== Personal life ==
He was married to journalist Nancy Pazos, with whom he has three children.

== Electoral history ==
=== Executive ===
Electoral history of Diego Santilli
Election	Office	List	Votes			Result	Ref.
Election	Office	List	Total	%	P.	Result	Ref.
2015 1-R	Deputy Chief of Government of Buenos Aires	Republican Proposal	832,619	45.56%	1st	→ Round 2	
2015 2-R	Deputy Chief of Government of Buenos Aires	Republican Proposal	861,380	51.64%	1st	Elected	
2019	Deputy Chief of Government of Buenos Aires	Juntos por el Cambio	1,095,013	55.90%	1st	Elected	

=== Legislative ===
Electoral history of Diego Santilli
Election	Office	List	#	District	Votes			Result	Ref.
Election	Office	List	#	District	Total	%	P.	Result	Ref.
1999	National Deputy	Justicialist Party	3	City of Buenos Aires	180,304	9.18%	3rd (Note: Presented on an electoral list. The data shown represents the share of the vote the entire party/alliance received in that constituency.)	Not elected (Note: Assumed office on 9 October 2002 in replacement of Inés Pérez Suárez.)	
2003	City Legislator	Commitment to Change	5	City of Buenos Aires	179,730	10.35%	4th	Elected	
2005	City Legislator	Republican Proposal Alliance	2	City of Buenos Aires	591,552	33.21%	1st	Elected	
2013	National Senator	PRO Union	2	City of Buenos Aires	722,831	39.26%	1st	Elected	
2021	National Deputy	Together	1	Buenos Aires Province	3,550,321	39.77%	1st	Elected	
2025	National Deputy	La Libertad Avanza	1 (Note: Assumed the first place in the list following the resignation of José Luis Espert.)	Buenos Aires Province	3,605,127	41.45%	1st	Elected	

Political offices
Preceded by Lisandro Catalán	Minister of the Interior; 2025–2026	Succeeded by Gustavo Coria
Preceded by Manuel Adorni	Chief of the Cabinet of Ministers; 2026–present	Incumbent
