= Susana Beatriz Decibe =

Argentine sociologist

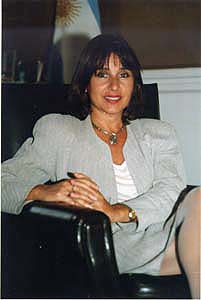
Susana Decibe

Susana Beatriz Decibe is an Argentine sociologist and beauty pageant titleholder who won Belleza Argentina 1977 and represented her country at Miss World 1977 but Unplaced. She has also served as the Minister of Education (1996–99).

== Early life ==
Born in Bragado on 7 August 1949, Decibe is a cousin of comedian Eber Luis Decibe. After finishing her schooling, Decibe attended the University of Buenos Aires, from where she earned her degree in sociology. She did her master's degree from Latin American Social Sciences Institute (FLACSO).

== Career ==
A member of the Peronist Youth, Decibe joined the Montoneros for a brief period. During the 1976 Argentine coup d'état, she was detained at the Navy Petty-Officers School of Mechanics (ESMA). Decibe became an advisor to the Argentine Chamber of Deputies's Education Commission in 1989. In 1996, she was appointed minister of education, the third one during the presidency of Carlos Menem. Her predecessor Jorge Alberto Rodríguez had suggested her name to Menem. However, she resigned from her office in 1999, as a protest to government's reduction in education budget. Manuel García Solá succeeded her.

== Personal life ==
Decibe married a company executive with whom she had four children. The couple separated in 2002.
