= Coronel Hilario Lagos =

Coordinates: 35°01′S 63°56′W

- Rural locality and village
- Interactive map of Coronel Hilario Lagos
- Country: Argentina
- Province: La Pampa Province
- Time zone: UTC−3 (ART)

Coronel Hilario Lagos is a village and rural locality (municipality) in La Pampa Province in Argentina.
