= Manuel Adorni =

Argentine politician

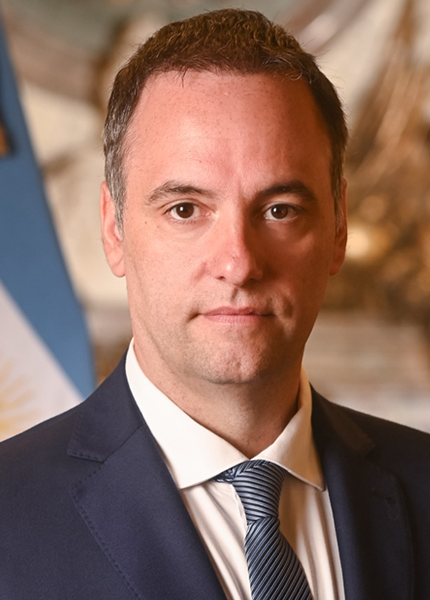
- Official portrait, 2024.

Chief of the Cabinet of Ministers
- In office 31 October 2025 – 27 June 2026
- President: Javier Milei
- Preceded by: Guillermo Francos
- Succeeded by: Diego Santilli

Spokesperson and Communications Officer of the Government of Argentina
- In office 10 December 2023 – 18 September 2024
- President: Javier Milei
- Preceded by: Gabriela Cerruti
- Succeeded by: Himself (as Secretary of Communication and Press)

Personal details
- Born: 28 February 1980 (age 46) La Plata, Buenos Aires, Argentina
- Party: La Libertad Avanza (since 2024)
- Other political affiliations: Republicanos Unidos (2021–2024)
- Education: Argentine University of Enterprise (BA)
- Occupation: Journalist, politician

Manuel Adorni (Spanish pronunciation: [maˈnwel aˈðoɾni]; born 28 February 1980) is an Argentine politician, certified public accountant, and educator, who has recently served as the Chief of the Cabinet of Ministers and spokesperson for the President of Argentina.

== Early life and education ==
He studied Public Accounting and Teaching at the Argentine University of Enterprise. Adorni taught at the Inter-American Open University and served as a professor at the Higher School of Economics and Business Administration.

In his journalism career, he was a regular columnist for the newspaper Infobae and hosted radio programs on Radio Rivadavia, where he also hosted "No va más" on Saturdays from 1 to 3 PM. He also appeared on news channels such as LN+, América (on the show "Intratables"), A24, and hosted his program on Canal Metro.

In 2019, he co-founded the political party "Uni2" with a group of Argentine liberals, which later merged with other liberal groups in 2020 to become United Republicans. The 2021 elections were the party's first participation, but Adorni did not run for any position.

=== Spokesperson of the Presidency ===
In November 2023, after Javier Milei’s victory in the presidential election and Marina Calabró’s refusal of the spokesperson position offer, Adorni was announced as the future presidential spokesperson. After Milei's inauguration on December 10, he assumed the position and delivered his first press conference a day later at the Casa Rosada.

Adorni was appointed chief of the Cabinet of Ministers on 31 October 2025, replacing Guillermo Francos. He resigned on 27 June 2026, after an scandal involving illicit enrichment.

== Electoral history ==
Electoral history of Manuel Adorni
Election	Office	List	#	District	Votes			Result	Ref.
Election	Office	List	#	District	Total	%	P.	Result	Ref.
2025	City Legislator	La Libertad Avanza	1	City of Buenos Aires	495,966	30.70%	1st (Note: Presented on an electoral list. The data shown represents the share of the vote the entire party/alliance received in that constituency.)	Elected	

== Controversies ==
In March 2026, Adorni became involved in a national scandal when a media outlet photographed him traveling with his wife (who does not hold public office) on the presidential aircraft en route to the financial event "Argentina Week", led by President Javier Milei in New York City.

In response, Adorni stated: "I wanted my wife to accompany me [...] because I'm here for a week working extremely hard" ( [sic]). At the same time, it was reported that his wife had purchased an airline ticket to New York costing more than US$5,000 — paid for by Adorni, along with her travel expenses — raising questions about the couple's declared income.

It was also reported that the couple had traveled to Punta del Este (during the Carnival period) on a business jet, costing no less than US$10,000, though Adorni did not clarify who paid for the flight. Critics further noted that both his and his wife’s expenditures appeared significantly higher than their reported salaries. Additionally, he has been linked to ownership of a property in a gated community in northern Buenos Aires Province, whose value is considered high relative to his declared income.

Further reports indicated that the official had also purchased an apartment in the Caballito neighborhood, despite previously stating that his lifestyle "had not changed" since joining the government, in contrast with the apparent discrepancy between his salary and current assets.

== Personal life ==
Adorni is married to Bettina Angeletti, and has two children. He has a brother, Francisco Jorge Adorni, a accountant who serves as head of auditing at the Ministry of Defense.

== Notes ==
Political offices
Preceded by Guillermo Francos	Chief of the Cabinet of Ministers; 2025–present	Incumbent
