= Chief of the Cabinet of Ministers =

Political office of Argentina

Chief of the Cabinet of Ministers of Argentina
- Jefe de Gabinete de Ministros de la Nación Argentina
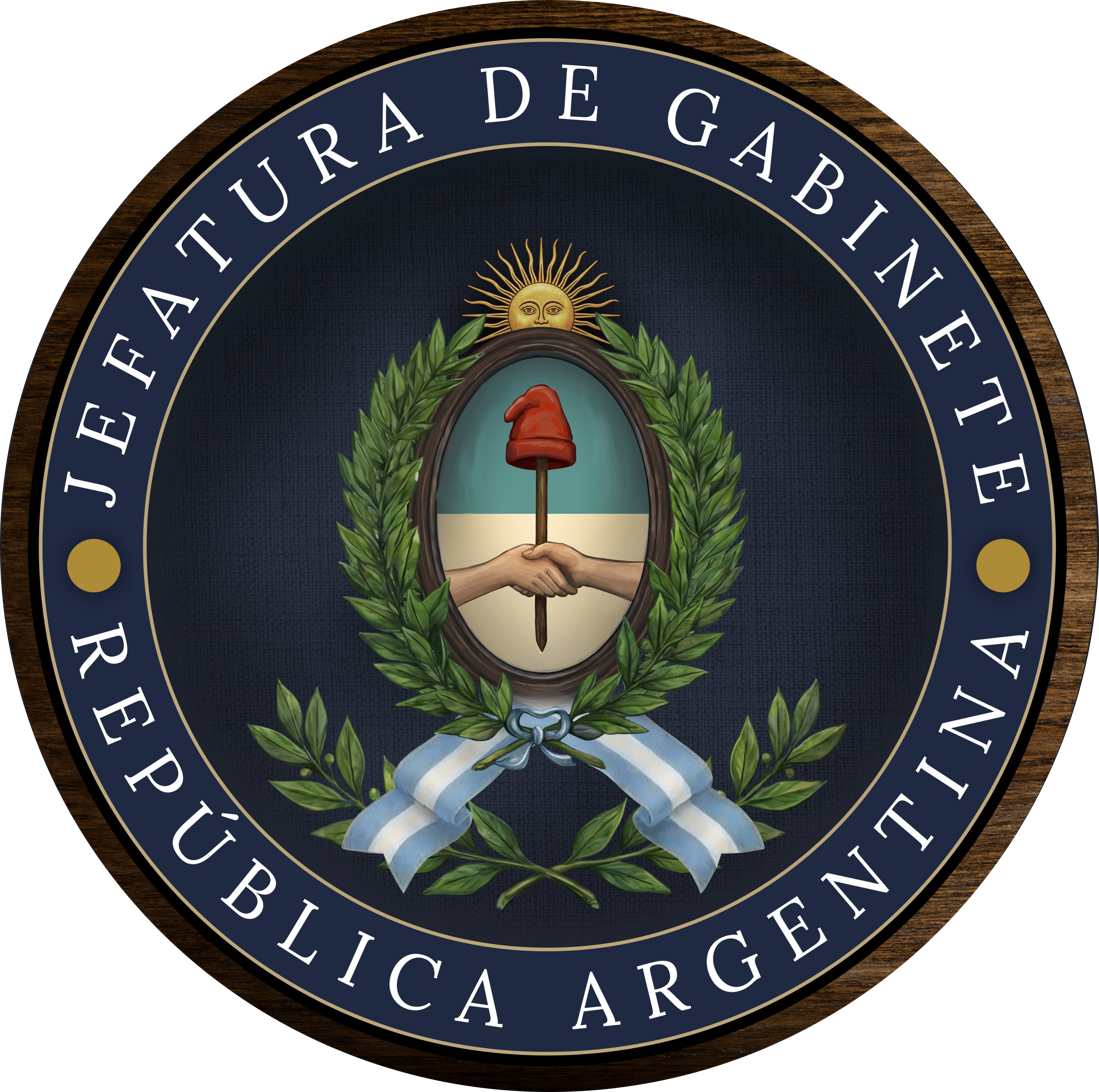
- Seal of the chief of the Cabinet of Ministers

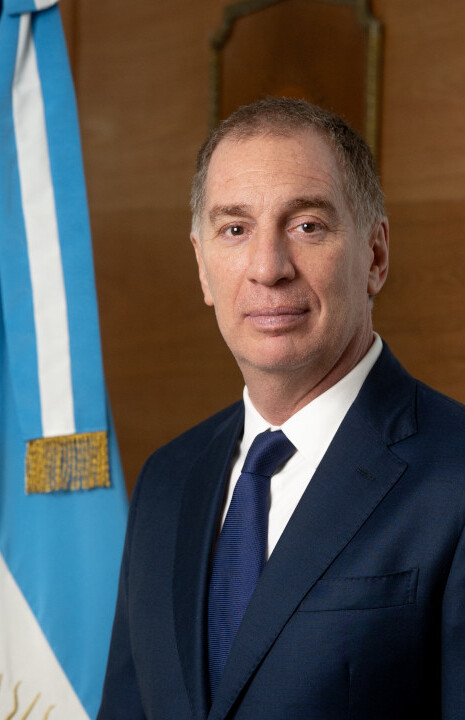
- Incumbent; Diego Santilli since 28 June 2026
- Government of Argentina
- Style: Mr. Chief of the Cabinet
- Reports to: President of Argentina and Argentine National Congress
- Seat: Edificio Somisa, Buenos Aires
- Appointer: President of Argentina
- Term length: At the president's pleasure
- Constituting instrument: Argentine Constitution of 1853 (1994 amendment)
- Inaugural holder: Eduardo Bauzá
- Formation: 8 July 1995; 31 years ago
- Salary: $ 312,657.00 annually (2020)
- Website: argentina.gob.ar/jefatura

The chief of the Cabinet of Ministers of the Argentine Nation (Spanish: Jefe de Gabinete de Ministros de la Nación Argentina; JGM), more commonly known simply as the Cabinet chief (Spanish: Jefe de Gabinete) is a ministerial office within the government of Argentina tasked with overseeing the government's general administration and acting as a link between the national executive and the Argentine National Congress. The position was created by the 1994 amendment to the Argentine Constitution.

The Cabinet chief is not a prime minister, as in Argentina's presidential democracy the role of head of government is still bestowed upon the president. However, the Cabinet chief is still constitutionally obligated to give account of the general course of the government's policies before Congress, and may be removed through a vote of no confidence (moción de censura) with an absolute majority in both chambers of Congress.

The Cabinet chief office is currently held by Diego Santilli, succeeding Manuel Adorni, who resigned following an ongoing investigation on corruption.

== History ==
The office of the chief of the Cabinet of Ministers was established by the 1994 amendment to the Argentine Constitution. It was part of the agreements brokered by the two largest parties in Argentina at the time, the Justicialist Party (PJ) and the Radical Civic Union (UCR), in what is now known as the Pact of Olivos; the UCR, then led by former president Raúl Alfonsin, sought to reduce the significant political powers of the presidency and shift towards a parliamentary system. In the end, however, the overarching nature of Argentina's political system following the reform remained decidedly presidential, as the chief of the Cabinet of Ministers acts more as an extension of the president to whom the head of state may delegate a certain number of responsibilities, while also being constitutionally obligated to report to the National Congress.

The first Cabinet chief was Eduardo Bauzá, who was appointed on 8 July 1995 by President Carlos Saúl Menem.

== Attributes ==
The attributes of the chief of the Cabinet of Ministers are established by the articles 100 and 101 of the Constitution of Argentina. Most of the Cabinet chief's duties are related to the organization of the cabinet's work agenda and the general course of the government's performance, as well as acting as an intermediary between the executive power and the Argentine National Congress.

Specifically, articles 100 and 101 state:

Second Part: Authorities of the Nation

Chapter IV

The Chief of the Ministerial Cabinet and other Ministers of the Executive Power

Section 100.- The Chief of the Ministerial Cabinet and the other secretary ministers, whose number and powers shall be determined by a special law, shall be in charge of the business of the Nation and shall countersign and legalize the acts of the President with their signatures, without which said acts are void.

The Chief of the Ministerial Cabinet, politically liable before the National Congress, is empowered:

1.- To exercise the general administration of the country.

2.- To perform the acts and issue the rules necessary to exercise the powers granted by this section as well as those delegated by the President of the Nation, being countersigned by the pertinent secretary minister to which the act or rule refers.

3.- To appoint the employees of the Administration, except for those pertaining to the President.

4.- To exercise the functions and powers delegated to him by the President of the Nation and, with the consent of the Cabinet, to decide about matters that the Executive Power may indicate to him or, on his own account, about those he deems it necessary due to their importance, within the scope of his jurisdiction.

5.- To coordinate, prepare and convoke the meetings of the ministerial cabinet, presiding at them in the absence of the President.

6.- To submit to Congress the bills on Ministries and National Budget, with the prior consent of the Cabinet and the approval of the Executive Power.

7.- To have the revenues of the Nation collected and to enforce the National Budget Act.

8.- To countersign regulatory decrees of the laws, decrees to extend the ordinary legislative session of Congress or to convoke to an extraordinary one, and the messages of the President supporting legislative initiatives.

9.- To attend the meetings of Congress and take part in its debates, but not to vote.

10.- Once the ordinary legislative session of Congress has begun, to submit together with the other ministers a detailed report on the state of the Nation regarding the business of the respective departments.

11.- To give such oral and written reports and explanations that either of the Houses may request from the Executive Power.

12.- To countersign decrees about powers delegated by Congress, which shall be under the control of the Joint Standing Committee.

13.- To countersign, together with the other ministers, decrees of necessity and urgency and decrees on partial promulgation of laws. Within ten days of their approval, he shall personally submit these decrees to the consideration of the Joint Standing Committee.

The Chief of the Ministerial Cabinet shall not be simultaneously appointed to another ministry.

Section 101.- The Chief of the Ministerial Cabinet shall attend Congress at least once a month, alternating between each House, to report on the progress of the government, notwithstanding the provisions of Section 71. He may be interpellated for the purpose of considering a vote of censure, by the vote of the absolute majority of all the members of either House, and he may be removed by the vote of the absolute majority of the members of each House.

== Headquarters ==
The office of the Cabinet chief has two seats, one of them is located at the Somisa Building (officially known as the "Teniente General Castiñeiras" building), former headquarters of the Sociedad Mixta Siderúrgica Argentina (SOMISA), a state-owned metallurgy company created in 1972. Following the privatization of Somisa in 1993, the building was acquired by the national government to be used as the headquarters of the newly created Cabinet Chief's office. The building, designed in the modernist style by Mario Roberto Álvarez, was built from 1966 to 1977 and was the first building in Argentina to be made entirely out of 3 mm steel sheets and to be fully welded. It is located on Julio Argentino Roca Avenue in the Monserrat barrio of Buenos Aires.

The second seat is the Secretariat of Management and Public Employment Building (former "Banco Argentino-Uruguayo"), located on Diagonal Norte and San Martín streets in Buenos Aires. The building was designed by French architect Eduardo Le Monnier, and was seat of defunct Ministry of Modernization, created during the administration of Mauricio Macri in 2015. The ministry was then dissolved and became part of the Chief of the Cabinet of Ministers three years later.

== List of chiefs of the Cabinet of Ministers ==
| # | Portrait | Name (Lifespan) | Term of office | | Political party | President |
|---|---|---|---|---|---|---|
| 1 | | Eduardo Bauzá (1939–2019) | 8 July 1995 | 5 June 1996 | Justicialist Party | Carlos Menem |
| 2 | | Jorge Rodríguez (born 1944) | 5 June 1996 | 10 December 1999 | Justicialist Party | Carlos Menem |
| 3 | | Rodolfo Terragno (born 1943) | 10 December 1999 | 6 October 2000 | Radical Civic Union | Fernando de la Rúa |
| 4 | | Chrystian Colombo (born 1952) | 6 October 2000 | 20 December 2001 | Radical Civic Union | Fernando de la Rúa |
| 5 | | Humberto Schiavoni (born 1958) | 20 December 2001 | 23 December 2001 | Justicialist Party | Ramón Puerta |
| 6 | | Jorge Obeid (1947–2014) | 23 December 2001 | 30 December 2001 | Justicialist Party | Adolfo Rodríguez Saá |
| 7 | | Antonio Cafiero (1922–2014) | 30 December 2001 | 2 January 2002 | Justicialist Party | Eduardo Camaño |
| 8 | | Jorge Capitanich (born 1964) | 2 January 2002 | 3 May 2002 | Justicialist Party | Eduardo Duhalde |
| 9 | | Alfredo Atanasof (born 1949) | 3 May 2002 | 25 May 2003 | Justicialist Party | Eduardo Duhalde |
| 10 | | Alberto Fernández (born 1959) | 25 May 2003 | 23 July 2008 | Justicialist Party | Néstor Kirchner |
| 10 | | Alberto Fernández (born 1959) | 25 May 2003 | 23 July 2008 | Justicialist Party | Cristina Fernández de Kirchner |
| 11 | | Sergio Massa (born 1972) | 23 July 2008 | 7 July 2009 | Justicialist Party | Cristina Fernández de Kirchner |
| 12 | | Aníbal Fernández (born 1957) | 7 July 2009 | 10 December 2011 | Justicialist Party | Cristina Fernández de Kirchner |
| 13 | | Juan Manuel Abal Medina (born 1968) | 10 December 2011 | 20 December 2013 | Justicialist Party | Cristina Fernández de Kirchner |
| 14 | | Jorge Capitanich (born 1964) | 20 December 2013 | 26 February 2015 | Justicialist Party | Cristina Fernández de Kirchner |
| 15 | | Aníbal Fernández (born 1957) | 26 February 2015 | 10 December 2015 | Justicialist Party | Cristina Fernández de Kirchner |
| 16 | | Marcos Peña (born 1977) | 10 December 2015 | 10 December 2019 | Republican Proposal | Mauricio Macri |
| 17 | | Santiago Cafiero (born 1979) | 10 December 2019 | 20 September 2021 | Justicialist Party | Alberto Fernández |
| 18 | | Juan Luis Manzur (born 1969) | 20 September 2021 | 15 February 2023 | Justicialist Party | Alberto Fernández |
| 19 | | Agustín Rossi (born 1959) | 15 February 2023 | 10 December 2023 | Justicialist Party | Alberto Fernández |
| 20 | | Nicolás Posse (born 1965) | 10 December 2023 | 27 May 2024 | Independent | Javier Milei |
| 21 | | Guillermo Francos (born 1950) | 27 May 2024 | 31 October 2025 | Independent | Javier Milei |
| 21 | | Manuel Adorni (born 1980) | 31 October 2025 | 27 June 2026 | La Libertad Avanza | Javier Milei |
| 21 | | Diego Santilli (born 1967) | 28 June 2026 | Present | Republican Proposal | Javier Milei |
