= José Figueroa Alcorta =

11th President of Argentina (1860–1931)

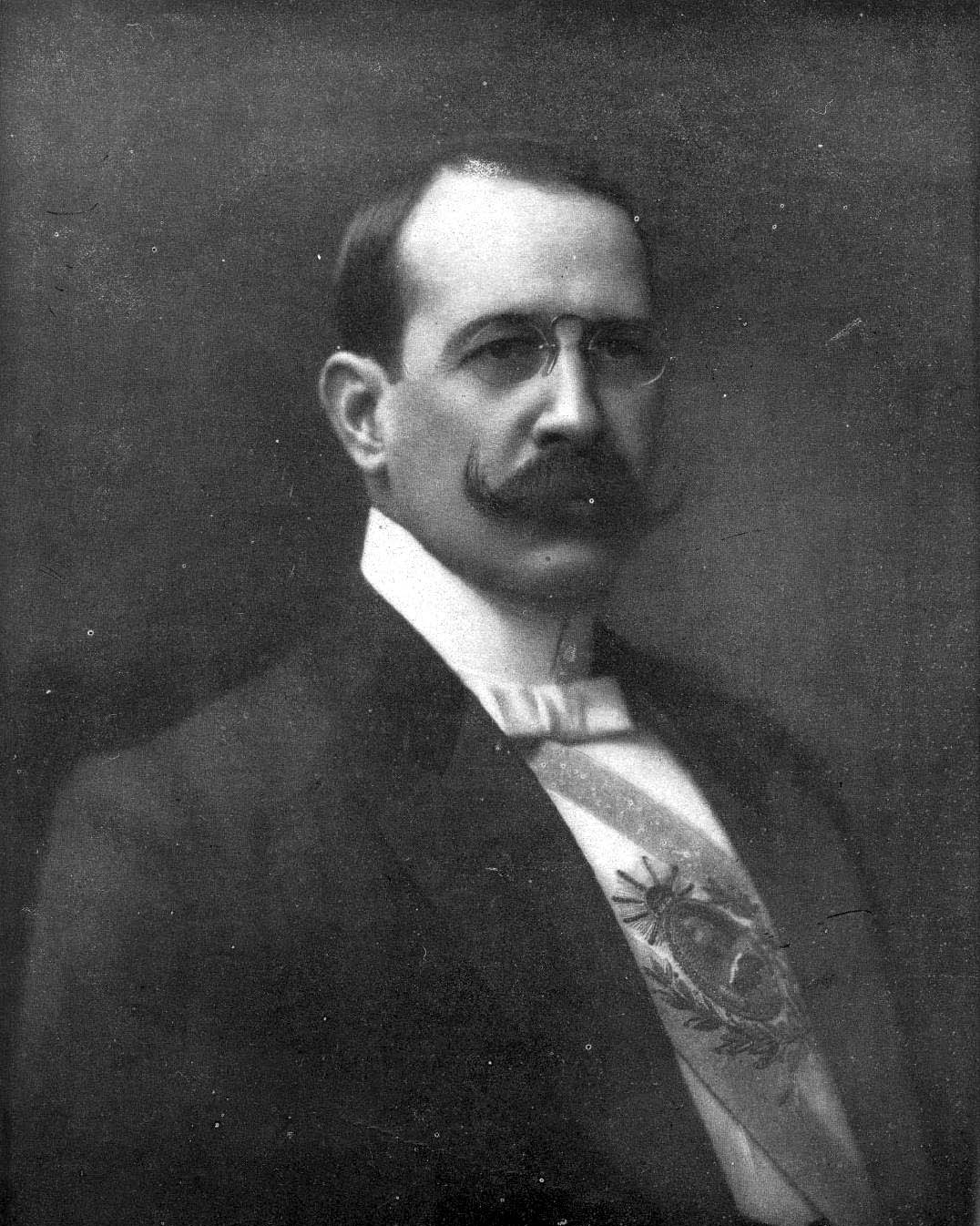
- Official portrait, 1906

16th President of Argentina
- In office March 13, 1906 – October 11, 1910
- Preceded by: Manuel Quintana
- Succeeded by: Roque Sáenz Peña

10th Vice President of Argentina
- In office October 12, 1904 – March 12, 1906
- President: Manuel Quintana
- Preceded by: Norberto Quirno Costa
- Succeeded by: Victorino de la Plaza

Personal details
- Born: José Figueroa Alcorta; November 20, 1860 Córdoba, Argentina
- Died: December 27, 1931 (aged 71) Buenos Aires, Argentina
- Resting place: La Recoleta Cemetery; Buenos Aires, Argentina
- Party: National Autonomist Party
- Spouse: Josefa Julia María Bouquet Roldán
- Children: Clara Julia; Mario Ramón; Jorge Esteban; Luis Héctor
- Education: National University of Córdoba
- Profession: Lawyer

José María Cornelio Figueroa Alcorta (Spanish: [xoˈse maˈɾia koɾˈneljo fiɣeˈɾoa alˈkoɾta]; November 20, 1860 – December 27, 1931) was an Argentine lawyer and politician, who managed to be the only person to head the three powers of the State: Vice President of the Nation (President of the Senate), from October 12, 1904 to March 12, 1906, President of the Nation from that date and until October 12, 1910; and President of the Supreme Court of Justice of the Argentine Nation, from 1929 until his death in 1931.

== Biography ==
Figueroa Alcorta was born in Córdoba as the son of José Figueroa and Teodosia Alcorta. He was elected a National Deputy for Córdoba before becoming Provincial Governor in 1895. In 1898 he returned to the Argentine Congress as a Senator. In 1904 he became Vice-President of Argentina. He was taken hostage in an unsuccessful February 1905 military coup attempt.

In 1906, Figueroa Alcorta succeeded Manuel Quintana as President. He was an active Freemason.

During his presidency, legislation was passed in 1907 that regulated work performed by women and children.

Political offices
Preceded by Norberto Quirno Costa	Vice President of Argentina; 1904–1906	Succeeded by Victorino de la Plaza
Preceded by Manuel Quintana	President of Argentina; 1906–1910	Succeeded by Roque Sáenz Peña
Preceded by Julio Astrada	Governor of Córdoba; 1895–1898	Succeeded by Cleto Peña
