= Norberto Quirno Costa =

Argentine lawyer, politician and diplomat

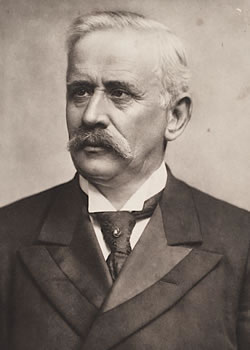

9th Vice President of Argentina
- In office October 12, 1898 – October 12, 1904
- President: Julio A. Roca
- Preceded by: José Evaristo Uriburu
- Succeeded by: José Figueroa Alcorta

Personal details
- Born: July 18, 1844 Buenos Aires
- Died: March 2, 1915 (aged 70) Buenos Aires
- Party: National Autonomist Party
- Spouse: Alcira Albarracín Pacheco
- Profession: Lawyer

Norberto Camilo Quirno Costa (July 18, 1844 – March 2, 1915) was an Argentine lawyer, politician, and diplomat.

== Life and times ==
Quirno Costa was born in Buenos Aires to Fernanda Costa and Gregorio Quirno. He received a juris doctor at the University of Buenos Aires, and married Alcira Albarracín Pacheco, with whom he had four children. He entered public service as an official in the Argentine legation in Brazil in 1868, and was appointed the following year as Undersecretary of Foreign Relations. Taking office toward the end of the Paraguayan War, in which Argentina, Brazil, and Uruguay were in a protracted war with Paraguay, Quirno Costa represented Argentina at the 1870 treaty ending hostilities, and obtained the concession of what is today Formosa Province (coveted for its Quebracho forests).

He formed part of a commission on the reform of the Buenos Aires Province Constitution in 1871, and was elected to Congress in 1878 for the newly formed National Autonomist Party. The election of that party's nominee, Miguel Juárez Celman, to the presidency in 1886 resulted in his appointment as Foreign Minister, during which he pursued regional international law agreements and negotiated a treaty with Chile to help settle the Puna de Atacama dispute, in which Argentine claims over Tarija, Bolivia were dropped for a greater share of the Puna de Atacama region (prized for its copper deposits).

Quirno Costa was appointed Ambassador to Chile in 1892, by which he sought, unsuccessfully, to resolve the Beagle Channel dispute between the two neighboring countries. The longtime leader of the National Autonomists, Julio A. Roca, ran again for the presidency in 1897 (he had been once elected, in 1880) and chose Quirno Costa as his running mate. He presided over the January 1898 constitutional amendment convention, and was elected with Roca that April, serving uneventfully as Vice President for the entirety of Roca's second, six-year term. He visited Europe during late 1902.

Quirno Costa returned briefly to government as Interior Minister (Home Secretary) to President José Figueroa Alcorta in 1906, but retired shortly afterward. He died in San Fernando, Buenos Aires, in 1915.

Political offices
Preceded by José Evaristo Uriburu	Vice President of Argentina; 1898-1904	Succeeded by José Figueroa Alcorta
