= Eduardo Bauzá =

Argentine lawyer and politician (1939–2019)

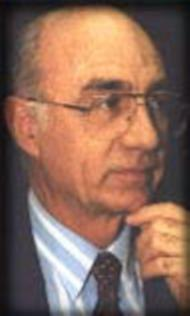

1st Chief of the Cabinet of Ministers
- In office 8 July 1995 – 5 June 1996
- President: Carlos Menem
- Preceded by: Office created
- Succeeded by: Jorge Rodríguez

Minister of the Interior
- In office 8 July 1989 – 15 December 1990
- President: Carlos Menem
- Preceded by: Juan Carlos Pugliese
- Succeeded by: Julio Mera Figueroa

Minister of Health
- In office 15 December 1989 – 20 September 1990
- President: Carlos Menem
- Preceded by: Antonio Erman González
- Succeeded by: Alberto Kohan

National Deputy
- In office 10 December 1987 – 8 July 1989
- Constituency: Mendoza

National Senator
- In office 5 June 1996 – 10 December 1999
- Constituency: Mendoza

Personal details
- Born: 16 November 1939 Mendoza, Argentina
- Died: 17 February 2019 (aged 79) Mendoza, Argentina
- Resting place: Parque de Descanso de Guaymallén
- Party: Justicialist Party
- Education: Universidad de Mendoza
- Profession: Lawyer

Eduardo Bauzá (16 November 1939 – 17 February 2019) was an Argentine lawyer and politician who served as minister of health and minister of the interior during Carlos Menem's presidency and was later the first chief of the Cabinet of Ministers. He was also an Argentine senator from 1996 to 1999.

== Education and career ==
Eduardo Bauzá graduated from the Universidad de Mendoza and started his political career in Mendoza Province. He was appointed to his first political office in 1973 in La Rioja Province as the secretary of development, under Governor Carlos Menem. Menem and Bauzá were deposed during the 1976 Argentine coup d'état, and Bauzá was detained by the National Reorganization Process a few months later. He was under arrest from May 1976 to April 1977. He resumed his political career in 1982 and helped establish the "Federalismo y liberación" (Spanish: "Federalism and liberation"; FyL) faction within the Justicialist Party (PJ), led by Menem. They both ran in the primary election in 1983 and lost to Ítalo Argentino Lúder. Parallel to that, Bauzá ran in the PJ primary election for governor that year and lost to Carlos Motta.

He was elected as a deputy for Mendoza in 1987. He resigned to organize the political campaign of Menem for the 1989 Argentine general election, which Menem won. After the election, Bauzá was appointed minister of interior. He served for six months, and then moved to the Ministry of Health. During his tenure, a controversy known as the “Smock scandal” (Spanish: Escándalo de los guardapolvos) emerged. The government had purchased 500,000 school smocks at inflated prices but delivered only about ten percent, despite receiving full advance payments. In 2005, Eduardo Bauzá was acquitted of wrongdoing by Judge María Romilda Servini de Cubría.

== Later career and retirement ==
After several months, Bauzá served as general secretary of the presidency. The 1994 amendment of the Constitution of Argentina created the office of the Chief of the Cabinet of Ministers; Bauzá was the inaugural holder in 1995. He resigned in 1996, suffering Hepatitis C. He was subsequently elected senator. In 1999, he ended his term, retired from politics, and returned to the province of Mendoza.

Bauzá organized the political campaign of Menem for the 2003 Argentine general election. Menem won the elections but refused to run in a ballotage election (two-round system) against Santa Cruz governor Néstor Kirchner. At that point, Bauzá retired from internal party politics as well. Afterward, he turned his attention to the family business. His great-grandfather had founded the Bauzá noodle brand, which continues to operate.

== Illness and death ==
In 2004 Bauzá was diagnosed with Alzheimer's disease. His son reported that, although he was severely incapacitated by the disease, he remained lucid during his later years. He died on 17 February 2019, of undisclosed reasons. His family, which includes five sons and seven grandsons, refused to hold a public funeral, and arranged only a private ceremony. He was buried at the Parque de Descanso de Guaymallén cemetery, outside of the city of Mendoza.
