= Enrique Nosiglia =

Argentine politician (born 1949)

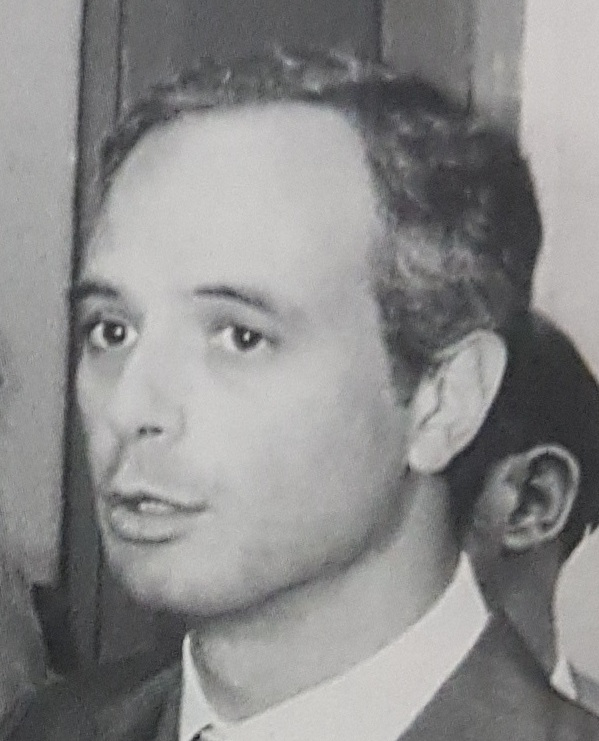
Nosiglia in 1987

Enrique "Coti" Nosiglia (born 1949), is an Argentine politician. He served as Minister of Interior for president Raúl Alfonsín. He promoted the 2015 alliance between the Radical Civic Union and the Republican Proposal, which created the Cambiemos alliance.

in 2019, he filed a lawsuit against Elisa Carrió, the Argentine National Deputy for Buenos Aires, for alleged insults (defamation) made against him.
