= Ángel Borlenghi =

Argentine labour leader and politician

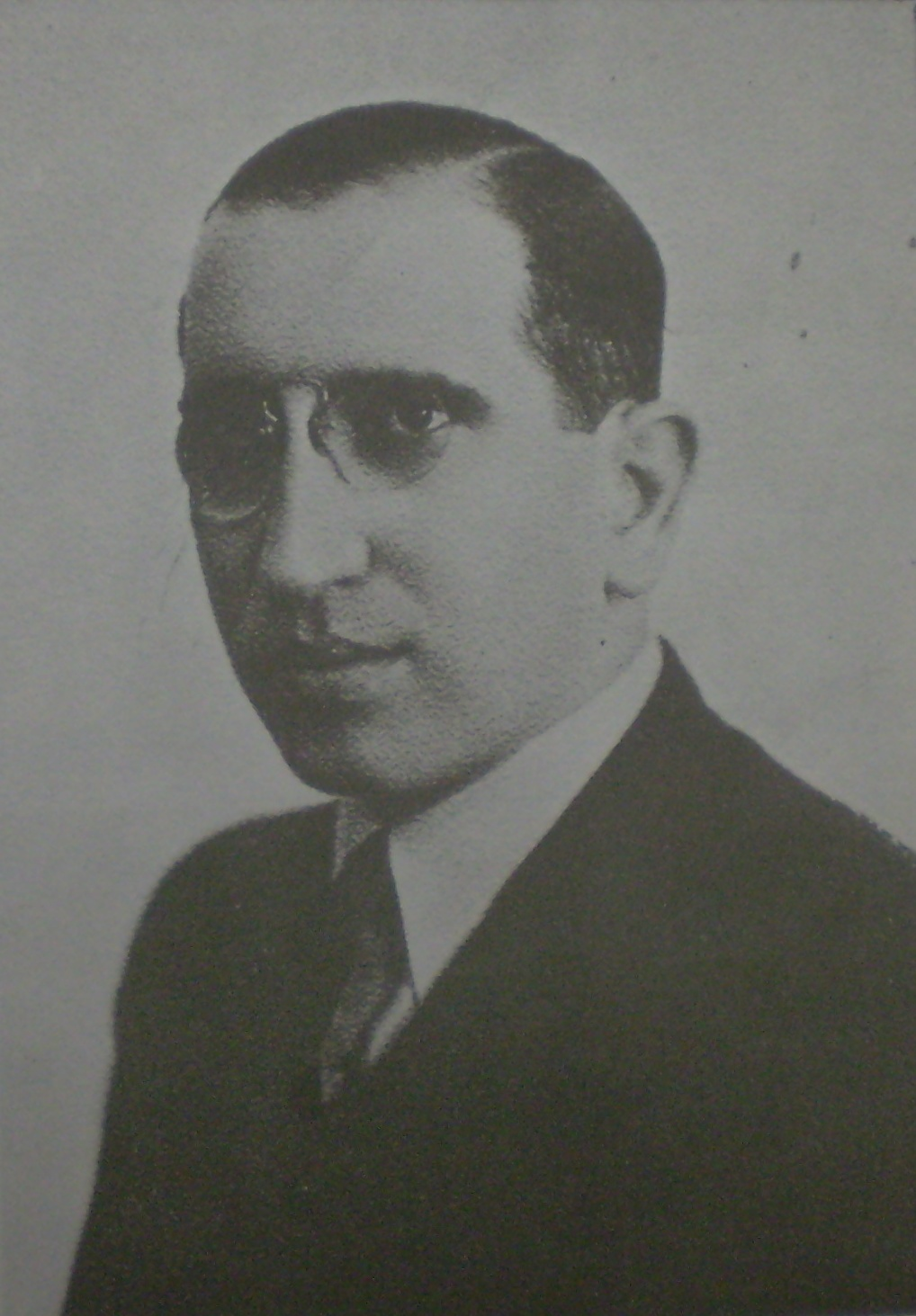
Ángel Borlenghi

Ángel Borlenghi (February 1, 1904 – August 6, 1962) was an Argentine labour leader and politician closely associated with the Peronist movement.

== Life and times ==
=== Early life and the labor movement ===
Ángel Gabriel Borlenghi was born in Buenos Aires to Italian immigrants, in 1904. Becoming a retail clerk by profession, Borlenghi's socialist ideology soon led him to join the Commercial Employees' Federation (FEC). His position in the union rose after his fellow socialists advanced the 1926 formation of the Argentine Workers' Confederation (COA), and Borlenghi was named Secretary General of the FEC when the COA fused with another, leftist union (the Union of Argentine Syndicates, or USA) to become the CGT (still the nation's preeminent labor union), in 1930.

Borlenghi was named director of the Interunion Committee, and thus given the twin responsibilities of coordinating policy among the myriad unions in the CGT, as well as resolving conflict as it appeared. The CGT presented its first platform in 1931, drafting a program calling for a guaranteed freedom to organize, greater pay and benefits, and a formal say in public policy, among other reforms. Sparing use of strike actions and intense lobbying, particularly on Borlenghi's part as the Interunion Committee head, resulted in Congressional passage of the landmark Law 11729 (formalizing labor contracts in the service sector), in 1936.

This success arrived during a period of growing divisions in the CGT, however. As head of the largest sector within the CGT at the time, Borlenghi helped separate the more socialist sectors from the rest in 1936, leaving them to reconstitute the smaller USA union. Further contention led to Borlenghi's joining municipal workers' leader Francisco Pérez Leirós into a "CGT Number 2," in 1942. The following June, however, conservative President Ramón Castillo was deposed in a nationalist coup d'état. The removal of the mercantilist and politically fraudulent Castillo regime elicited initial, positive reactions from both CGTs, and Borlenghi engaged in policy discussions with Alberto Gilbert, the new Interior Minister (a position overseeing domestic security policy, at the time). Gilbert, however, promptly allied the new regime with the less combative "CGT Number 1," ordering the dissolution of the CGT-2.

=== A new alliance ===
The decision did not permanently divide the labor movement, however, because one of the coup's leaders, Lt. Col. Domingo Mercante, was tied through family connections to the railway workers' union. Its leader, José Domenech, was also the Secretary General of the CGT-1. The Railway Union's chief counsel, Juan Atilio Bramuglia, seized this opening to create a close alliance with the government, and was joined in these talks by Borlenghi and Pérez Leirós (whose banned CGT-2 was larger). The negotiations were soon joined by the Secretary of Labor and personal friend of Mercante's: Col. Juan Perón.

Union representatives found in Perón a sympathetic and charismatic voice through whom they could be a strong influence in government policy. Only around 10 percent of Argentina's labor force was unionized at the time, and many union leaders saw a unique opportunity in Perón, who obtained their support for his request to the president that the Labor Secretariat by made into a cabinet-level ministry. Others supported the idea of backing Perón in a Labor Party ticket, outright. Borlenghi was initially opposed to such a mutually-binding endorsement, though by 1945, the Labor Minister's record had won him over, as well as much of the now-reunified CGT.

Perón rise to prominence fed rivalries within the regime, which had him resign as Vice President and arrested on October 9. Convinced that he had been permanently sidelined, a meeting of 24 union leaders resolved to create their Labor Party, and to proceed with or without Perón. There were two abstentions, however: telecommunications workers' leader Luis Gay and Borlenghi. They joined Perón's mistress, Eva Duarte, in organizing mass demonstrations for his release and by October 17, they had also obtained most other unions' support for the measure. The successful mobilization led to the charter of the Labor Party on October 24 - with Perón as its candidate. Borlenghi, still affiliated to the Socialist Party of Argentina, resigned his membership in it when the party joined an opposition alliance, the Democratic Union.

=== Interior Minister ===
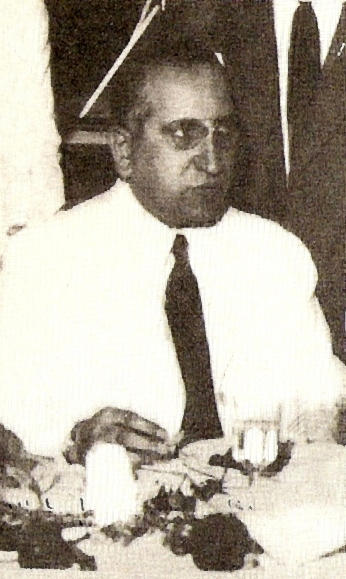
As Interior Minister, Borlenghi was entrusted by Perón not only to look after law enforcement - but also the opposition.

Handily elected in February 1946, Perón rewarded Borlenghi's tested support and organizational skill with an appointment as Interior and Justice Ministry. The post would give him purview over the courts, law enforcement and vetting power over most political strategy. He moved quickly to advance the president's agenda by organizing a Labor Party convention for the purpose of re-chartering it as the Peronist Party, in 1947, and ordered the purchase of a majority stake in Haynes Publishing, from which El Laborista, Mundo Peronista and an array of other magazines were published as government mouthpieces. Through his control of the nation's largest police department, the 25,000-man "Policía Federal," Borlenghi had numerous opposition figures jailed. Some of the most intransigent were taken to a basement in the newly expanded Ramos Mejía Hospital (one of Buenos Aires' largest), where torture became routine.

The president's confidence in Borlenghi was buttressed by the creation of the Federal Security Council in 1951, which included transferring the National Gendarmery and the Naval Prefecture (akin to the Coast Guard) from military control. Faced with such measures, some among the opposition began making conciliatory overtures to the powerful Interior Minister; a June 1953 meeting with a delegation from the conservative Democratic Party, for instance, led to the release of former Finance Minister Federico Pinedo and others in their leadership. Others soon followed, though the Peronists' main opposition, the centrist UCR, refused this approach, leading Borlenghi to publicly blame them for the continuation of the state of siege declared in April.

Flush with electoral and economic successes during 1954, Perón began to dispense with his hitherto warm relations with the Catholic Church by confronting "Catholic Action," a youth organization within the church. Borlenghi initially opposed confrontation with the powerful Church, though once the decision had been made, he contributed to the fracas by shuttering El Pueblo, the leading Catholic periodical, in December - an affront followed by the president's December 22 legalization of divorce and prostitution. His lack of enthusiasm for what he saw as a gratuitous fight did not protect him from Catholic scorn, once the die had been cast by Perón. A practicing Catholic himself, Borlenghi's wife, Carla, was Jewish, encouraging more reactionary Catholics to focus blame on him not only for his role as the nation's chief law enforcement officer; but also for his wife's allegedly hostile influence on him.

Ultimately, as Borlenghi had warned, Perón's struggle with his country's chief religious institution destroyed military loyalty for his administration. The June 16, 1955, bombing of Plaza de Mayo during a Peronist rally by the Argentine Air Force (killing 364 - including a bus-full of children) brutally illustrated this crisis and on June 29, the president attempted to regain control by lifting the 1953 state of siege and replacing Borlenghi and others. Subsequent shifts in strategy and rhetoric were to no avail: Perón was overthrown three months later.

=== Later life and legacy ===
Borlenghi, who was in Italy at the time of the coup, had his home ransacked by troops - an incident which destroyed a great volume of documentation pertaining to his role in Peronism. He remained among the less-well understood figures inside the movement, despite being the second-most powerful. Borlenghi never abandoned the idea of Perón's return to power, and in early 1961, he held informal discussions with Che Guevara on the possibility of an alliance between Fidel Castro's new regime and the Peronist movement. Borlenghi died suddenly in Italy in 1962, at age 58.
