= Lithuanian Argentines =

Ethnic group in Argentina

Argentinos lietuviai (Lithuanian) Lituano-argentinos (Spanish)
- (Argentina) (Lithuania)
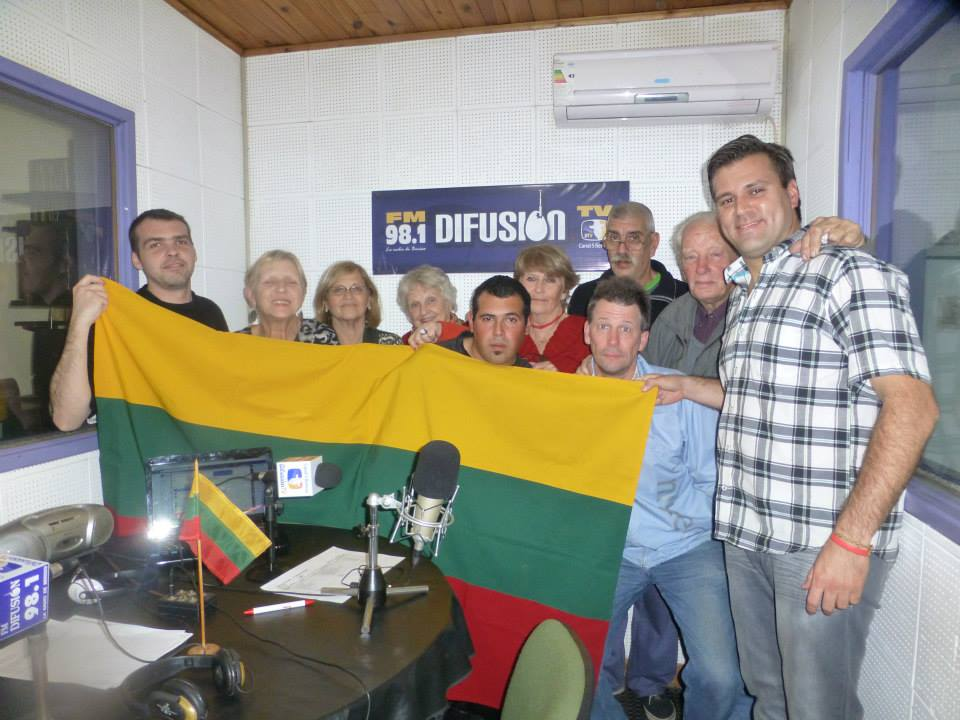
- Members of the program "Echoes of Lithuania"

Total population
- Unknown (by birth); 35,000 (in 1920s) (by ancestry)

Regions with significant populations
- Mainly in Buenos Aires and Santa Fe

Languages
- Spanish • Lithuanian

Religion
- Majority: Catholicism; Minority: Irreligion

Related ethnic groups
- Lithuanians; Lithuanian Americans; Lithuanian Brazilians; Lithuanian Canadians; Lithuanian Uruguayans

Lithuanian Argentines are Argentine citizens who are fully, partially, or predominantly of Lithuanian descent, or Lithuanian-born people residing in Argentina. During the 1920s about 35,000 Lithuanians arrived in Argentina.

== History ==
=== Pioneers and settlements ===
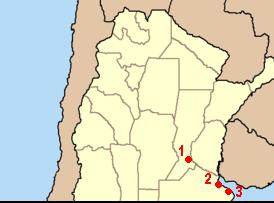
Main cities with Lithuanian population in Argentina: 1.Rosario 2. Buenos Aires 3. Berisso

In 1909, a group of Lithuanian immigrants from the cities of Ensenada and Berisso founded the Lithuanian Mutual Aid Society Vargdienis, whose prominent members were the Lithuanian gentlemen Rimavičius, Pavilonis, Bogužas and Baltušis. With less specific dates it is known that even before the First World War there had been organisations of Lithuanian immigrants in Villa Diego, near Rosario, Santa Fe (Aušros žvaigždė) and in the city of Avellaneda (Susivienijimas lietuvių Argentinoje). The collectivity of Berisso meanwhile adopted the name of Nemunas, which retains to the present. The Lithuanian diaspora in Argentina have their own radio programme called "Echoes of Lithuania" (Ecos de Lituania).

There is also a significant Lithuanian-Jewish community.

== Argentina-Lithuania relations ==
The last visit by a Lithuanian leader to the country occurred in 2008, when President Valdas Adamkus visited Buenos Aires. Both countries historically maintained good relations since they were first established in 1921. After Soviet domination, in 1991, Argentina was the first Latin American country to recognize the country's independence.

== Organisations ==
They established their own institutions: Sociedad Lituana de Socorros Mutuos Vargdienis (established 1909), Aušros žvaigždė, Susivienijimas lietuvių Argentinoje, Nemunas.

== Notable Lithuanian Argentines ==
- Héctor Adomaitis, football player
- José Alperovich, politician
- Rimas Álvarez Kairelis, rugby union player
- Ricardo Ivoskus, lawyer and politician
- Liudas Jakavicius-Grimalauskas, pianist
- Julieta Jankunas, field hockey player
- Joseph Kessel, journalist
- Antonio Krapovickas, botanist
- Fanny Mikey, actress and theatre producer
- Gustavo Majauskas, Olympic weightlifter

== See also ==
- European Argentines
- French Argentines
- Estonian Argentines
- Romanian Argentines
