= Notebook scandal =

2018 corruption scandal in Argentina

- Native name: Caso de los Cuadernos
- Date: 2018
- Location: Argentina
- Type: Scandal
- Theme: Organized corruption
- First reporter: Óscar Centeno
- Arrests: 26

The notebook scandal or graft scandal (called "Caso de los Cuadernos" in Spanish, transl. "Notebooks Case/Scandal") took place in Argentina in 2018. It was started by the driver Óscar Centeno, who had worked for public officials during the presidencies of Néstor and Cristina Fernández de Kirchner, and denounced an organized corruption scheme. According to notes that he had kept in personal notebooks, he had frequently carried bags filled with US dollars to several locations, including public buildings and even the personal house of Cristina Fernández de Kirchner. Those bags would be payments for bribes.

Several businessmen named in the notebooks were detained, and then confessed such payments to turn state's evidence. According to their testimonies, the Kirchners extorted them into paying bribes. José López, a politician detained a couple of years before, agreed to confess to the judge his role in it. It is thought that bureaucrats from the Ministry of Planning extorted bribes, at least in part, in order to finance political campaigns.

As an Argentine Senator, Cristina Fernández de Kirchner has parliamentary immunity, which protects her from arrest and search and seizure operations unless the Argentine Senate agrees to it. Judge Bonadio asked the Senate for such a search at Fernández de Kirchner's houses, but most senators of the Justicialist Party stayed outside so that the voting failed for lack of quorum. A large demonstration outside the Congress was followed by a new vote, that agreed to the search. The search did not find any money, but found the remains of a bank vault and a stolen car.

== Notebooks ==
Óscar Centeno was the driver of Roberto Baratta, an official of the Ministry of Federal Planning, Public Investment and Services, under minister Julio de Vido, during the presidency of Néstor Kirchner (2003–2007) and Cristina Fernández de Kirchner (2007–2015). He filled several notebooks with details of places and hours of several trips he made to transport bags of cash. Those bags would have been provided to the national government by businessmen benefited with large contracts. The notebooks cover the 2005–2015 period. All the briberies mentioned in the notebooks amount to US$53 million, but the investigators consider that the actual operations may be closer to US$160 million.

Hilda Horovitz, the former wife of Centeno, was interviewed by the Noticias magazine. She explained that her husband wrote the notebooks for a potential extortion of Baratta, in case he may eventually try to fire him. She mentioned that Centeno had a fluent relation with Néstor Kirchner, and saw Cristina Kirchner in a less frequent manner.

The notebooks came to light thanks to a secret informant that provided them to the newspaper La Nación. Journalist Diego Cabot investigated them, but refused to run a scoop, gave photocopies of the notebooks to the judiciary, and returned the notebooks. As of August 2018, the identity of the informant and the current location of the original notebooks has not been disclosed.

== Detentions ==
Óscar Centeno was detained when the case started. He confirmed his authorship of the notebooks, and declared himself guilty, and asked to turn state's evidence. The Argentine "ley del arrepentido" (transl. "Law of the remorseful"), sanctioned in 2016, allows for those involved in corruption cases to receive leniency if their testimony helps to advance in the investigation of the case or get evidence against criminals of a higher hierarchy in the crime. The case was investigated by judge Claudio Bonadio until his death in February 2020.

Several businessmen were detained as a result of the case, such as Carlos Wagner, leader of the Argentine Construction Chamber, and Gerardo Ferreyra from Electroingeniería. The Techint group was raided in search of evidences. Francisco Rubén Valenti, director of Impsa, had left the country two days before and was detained when he returned. As of August 25, the case caused 26 high-profile arrests, and 15 are still in prison. Wagner declared that the 20% of the price of construction deals was a bribery that was paid to the government official that approved it. A similar system would have been used with public transportation contractors, whose fees were kept at a reduced price and the state paid subsidies for the rest; 5% of such subsidies were briberies for government officials. Claudio Uberti, from an agency that oversees highway concessions, declared that every holder of a concession had to pay them US$150 monthly. Other businessmen declared that they had to pay such bribes simply to be allowed to keep working.

The sweep of detentions scared most of the involved businessmen, who quickly declared themselves guilty and provided testimony in exchange of leniency. According to the testimonies, the businessmen were forced to pay the bribes. The case is investigated as a criminal conspiracy composed by public officials, and led by Néstor and Cristina Kirchner.

José López, a former official of the ministry of Federal Planning, had been detained in 2016 when he was caught trying to hide bags containing millions of dollars in a convent. Since his detention, he had only given vague and scant answers about the source of that money. When the scandal started, he agreed to give a full testimony and turn state's evidence. The judge accepted it, and he was removed from the prison in Ezeiza (shared with other convicted officials of the Kirchner government) to an undisclosed location. López also pointed to Néstor and Cristina Kirchner as the masterminds of the operation.

== Raid of Fernández de Kirchner's house ==
The prosecutors of the case asked for a search and seizure raid at the houses of Cristina Fernández de Kirchner. She has a house at the Recoleta neighbourhood of Buenos Aires, another one at Río Gallegos, Santa Cruz, and another at El Calafate. Unlike the other suspects, Fernández de Kirchner enjoys parliamentary immunity as a member of the Argentine Senate. The Senate had already refused to retract her immunity on an unrelated case. The search was not expected to find money, but to compare the internal building design with the details mentioned in the notebooks. The Senate was scheduled to vote on the judicial request, but the absence of many Peronist senators did not allow it, as there was not enough quorum to start deliberations. This caused a demonstration attended by tens of thousands of people. A new vote removed Fernández de Kirchner's immunity unanimously. She blamed the president Mauricio Macri for the whole event, claiming that it was a set up, and compared herself with the former Brazilian President Luiz Inácio Lula da Silva, held prisoner as a result of a Brazilian judicial case about corruption.

The raid revealed an armored door inside the wardrobe at the Recoleta house, and that the El Calafate house had a dismantled bank vault. A golden car, that had been reported as stolen, was also found within the premises and taken by the police. Some folders included intelligence about people opposed by the Kirchners, such as the Clarín newspaper, the family of the late prosecutor Alberto Nisman and even judge Bonadio himself. Other objects, like the presidential sash and cane, were confiscated on the assumption that they belong to the president of Argentina office and must be returned afterwards. Bonadio returned them, ruling that they belong to the person, and although it is customary that they donate them to museums, it is not mandatory. The police also found and removed an item of hand-written mail from the 19th-century national hero José de San Martín to the Chilean Bernardo O'Higgins. According to a national law, such pieces of historical values are considered a national heritage and the undeclared possession is considered a crime.

== See also ==
- The Route of the K-Money
- Operation Car Wash
