= Lithuanian Brazilians =

Lithuanian Brazilians Lituano-brasileiro Brazilijos lietuviai
- (Brazil) (Lithuania)
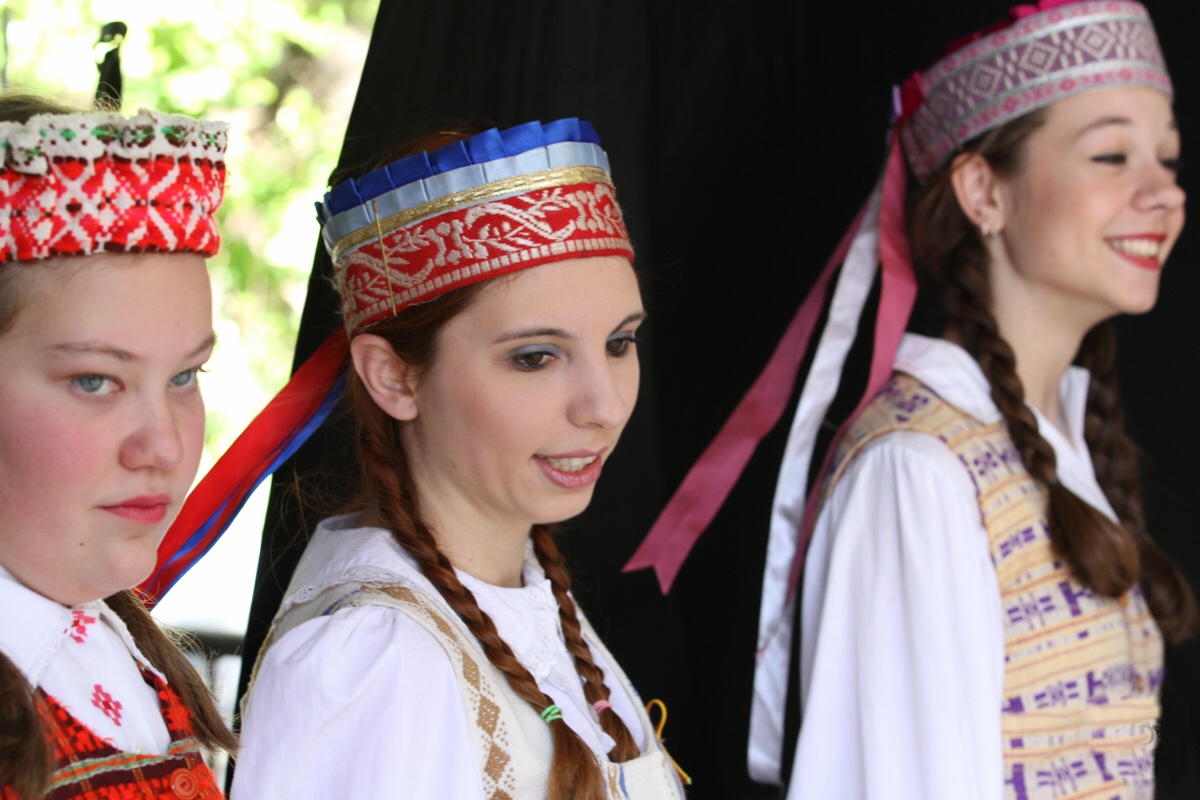
- Lithuanian descendants in São Paulo.

Total population
- c. 200,000-300,000

Regions with significant populations
- Mainly Southern and Southeastern Brazil

Languages
- Predominantly Brazilian Portuguese. Some also speak Lithuanian.

Religion
- Christianity (Predominantly Roman Catholicism) and others

Related ethnic groups
- Lithuanians; Lithuanian Americans; Lithuanian Argentines; Lithuanian Canadians; Lithuanian Uruguayans

Lithuanian Brazilians (Portuguese: Lituano-brasileiros, Lithuanian: Brazilijos lietuviai) are Brazilian citizens who are fully, partially or predominantly of Lithuanian descent or are Lithuanian-born people residing in Brazil.

== History ==
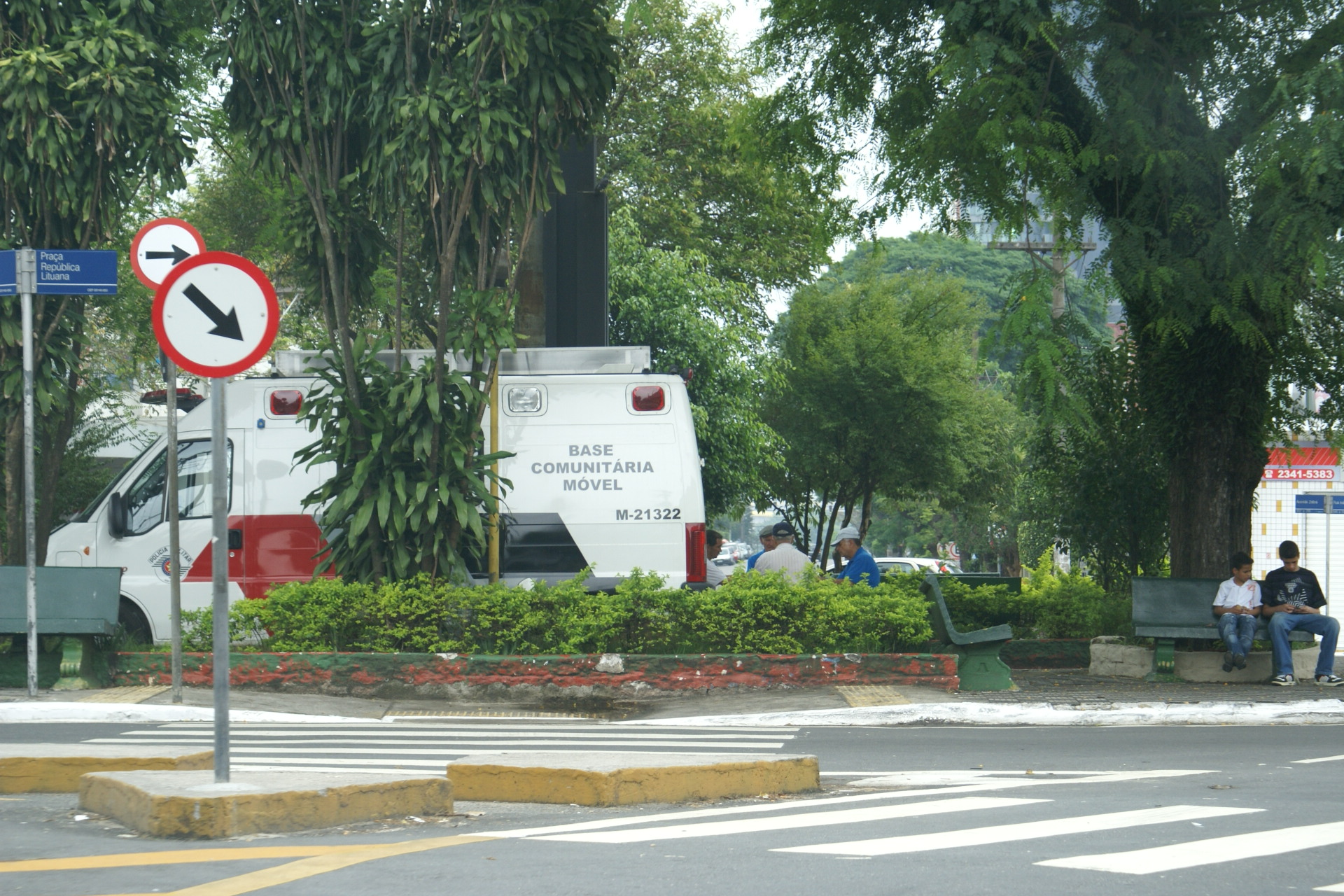
República Lituana Square in São Paulo

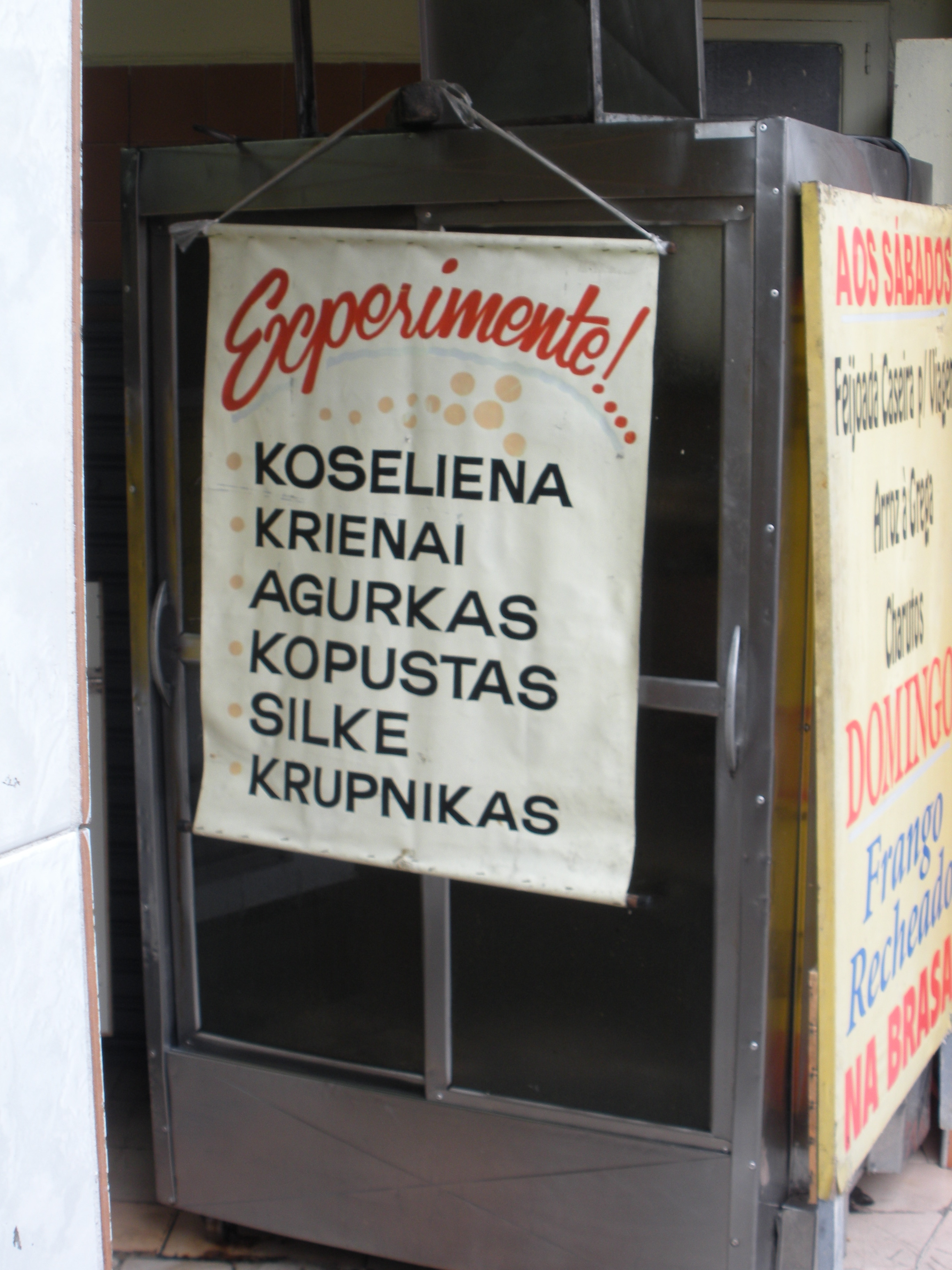
Store with Lithuanian inscriptions and products in São Paulo

The first Lithuanian to set foot on Brazilian soil, according to a record dated in 1866, was colonel Andrius Višteliauskas. His mission was to aid the Brazilian armed forces in the Paraguayan War. In 1890, a group of Lithuanian immigrants and their families arrived in Brazil, in a total of twenty-five Lithuanian families entered the land of Brazil. Their destination was the newly established colony of Ijuí, situated on the red and fertile soil of the northwestern part of the state of Rio Grande do Sul.

From early on Ijuí was settled by peoples of different ethno-linguistic backgrounds, unlike some other towns in the region. For example, the town of Guaraní das Missões was settled mostly by Polish immigrants. On the other hand, Germans, who came from the old German colonies (the Altkolonie) located in the eastern part of the state, went on to settle the municipality of Cerro Largo (formerly known as Serro Azul) and to make it into the small town that it is today.

One can still meet descendants from that first group of Lithuanian immigrants that settled in the Ijuí area. In 1926, around thirty thousand Lithuanian immigrants arrived in Brazil. They went to work in the many coffee plantations (fazendas) throughout the State of São Paulo. Other groups of immigrants also were lured into the country at the time to fulfill labor shortages. São Paulo may have been the destination of most Lithuanians but they also went to settle in other states such as Rio de Janeiro and Paraná. The town of Castro, in Paraná, a state south of São Paulo, boasts that amongst Japanese, Russians and other ethnic groups their town was also founded by Lithuanian immigrants.

In São Paulo Lithuanians developed strong social ties around church congregations. Most were Catholic but many also participated in Lutheran church services.

In 1930, the núcleo (small colony) of Barão de Antonina, was established in Itaporanga, São Paulo. The center of Lithuanian life in Brazil is Vila Zelina, a district in one of the biggest megalopolises of the world – the city of São Paulo. Everything seems to revolve around the Saint Joseph Catholic Church (São José). One can still taste some of the culinary of the Old World in this part of town. Easter eggs are still celebrated in the traditional way.

Two Lithuanian Brazilians (Waldemar Blatskauskas and Radvilas Gorauskas) represented the Brazil men's national basketball team in international tournaments, including the Summer Olympics.

In 2001, a documentary Eldorado: Lithuanians in Brazil or (Portuguese title: Eldorado: Lituanos no Brasil), by Fabiano Canosa and Julius Ziz was released about the story of Lithuanians in Brazil.

== Notable Lithuanian Brazilians ==
- Angélica Ksyvickis, presenter, actress and singer
- Lasar Segall, painter, engraver and sculptor
- Waldemar Blatskauskas, former professional basketball player
- Klabin family

== See also ==
- Brazil–Lithuania relations
- White Brazilians
