= José López scandal =

Political scandal in Argentina in 2016

- Date: June 14, 2016
- Location: Our Lady of Fátima convent at the General Rodríguez Partido, Argentina
- Participants: José López
- Outcome: Detention and trial of José López

José Francisco López was a low-profile Argentine politician who worked at the Ministry of Federal Planning, Public Investment and Services under minister Julio de Vido during the presidencies of Néstor and Cristina Fernández de Kirchner. He was detained in 2016 in compromising circumstances, while allegedly trying to hide bags containing millions of dollars in a convent.

== The event ==
In the early morning hours of June 14, 2016, López allegedly drove to the convent of Our Lady of Fátima on the General Rodríguez Partido and started to throw bags over the fence. Afterward, he climbed over the fence himself. A neighbor noticed and called the police, fearing for the safety of the three elderly nuns who lived there. According to security tapes retrieved afterwards, López took his rifle and the bags to the door of the convent, left them there, and returned to the fence to retrieve more bags, while the nuns took the bags inside.

The police arrived at 4:00 AM and initially detained López for illegal possession of a .22 caliber rifle. The police then found the bags containing approximately $7 million in plastic-wrapped dollars, euros, yens, and other currencies, as well as some luxury watches. The police found more money in the trunk of López's car, and in the convent kitchen. According to Security Minister Cristian Ritondo, López may have tried to bribe the police, to no avail. He was then charged for money laundering.

Police investigators suggest that López's plan, in case he could successfully leave the money at the convent, would be to go to the San Fernando Airport and escape in a private plane, which was ready to depart. This plane was usually used by the sons of Lázaro Báez, who are also detained on corruption charges. A detailed investigation of the convent revealed three hidden vaults, discovered by police dogs. The main one measured 3 by 2 by 1.4 metres (9.8 ft × 6.6 ft × 4.6 ft), and may have contained $480 million. The nuns said the vault had been set aside to house the remains of the elder Mother Alba.

== Judicial case ==
The López case is headed by judge Daniel Rafecas. Although court psychologists declared López fit to testify, he wanted to be declared incompetent. His lawyer Fernanda Herrera, who is also a cumbia singer, claimed that López was delirious and suffered hallucinations.

López was also indicted in a case involving the former governor Eduardo Fellner and the social activist Milagro Sala, who are suspected of stealing money earmarked for public works. López was taken to Jujuy to be formally notified of the charge and his right to a defense, but he refused to make any comments.

Although the dollars were plastic-wrapped in a way that only the Central Bank of Argentina (BCRA) is authorized to use, the BCRA was unable to identify the money and locate its source. It was pointed out that the BCRA only keeps track of official money movement. The confiscated money is being kept in a vault at the BCRA, for the duration of the case. If López is found guilty, the money would return to the state; otherwise, it would be returned to López.

The nun Alba Martínez, who led the convent, was declared incompetent to testify at trial by the judge. Aged 95, she suffers cognitive impairment and moderate dementia, and may not be able to answer questions with veracity. The prosecutor Federico Delgado will not appeal the ruling. Rafecas also declared the nun Inés Aparicio (who appears in the security tapes carrying bags into the convent) to be innocent, as she claimed that she thought that the bags contained food for welfare purposes. Prosecutors Delgado and Moldes do not trust her, and asked for her indictment.

== Notebook scandal ==
Since his detention, José López had only given vague and scant answers about the source of the money. When the Notebook scandal started, he agreed to give a full testimony and turn state's evidence. The judge accepted it, and he was removed from the prison in Ezeiza (shared with other convicted officials of the Kirchner government) to an undisclosed location. López pointed to Néstor and Cristina Kirchner as the masterminds of the operation.

His lawyer, Pamela Bisserier, asked for his release from prison. She argued that he had given testimony and helped the investigation, and that there was no risk of escape or interference. The prosecutor did not agree, and the judges Ricardo Basílico, Adrián Grunberg and Juan Michilini voted against the release. They considered that there was still a risk of escape, despite the collaboration, and that both cases are treated independently. They pointed that the deal between López and Claudio Bonadio, judge of the Notebook scandal case, is protected under seal, and considered that they do not know enough about it to justify a release.
