= Gabriel Katopodis =

Argentine politician

Gabriel Nicolás Katopodis
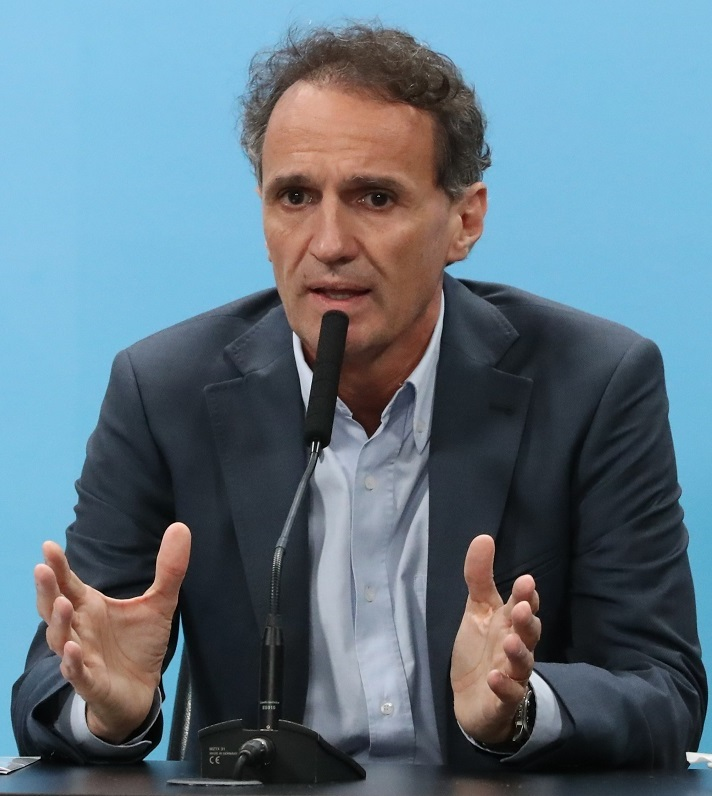

Minister of Public Works of Buenos Aires Province
- Incumbent
- Assumed office 10 December 2023
- Governor: Axel Kicillof
- Preceded by: Leonardo Nardini

Minister of Public Works
- In office 10 December 2019 – 10 December 2023
- President: Alberto Fernández
- Preceded by: Rogelio Frigerio (as Minister of the Interior, Public Works and Housing)
- Succeeded by: Guillermo Ferraro (as Minister of Infrastructure)

Mayor of General San Martín
- In office 10 December 2011 – 10 December 2019
- Preceded by: Ricardo Ivoskus
- Succeeded by: Fernando Moreira

Personal details
- Born: 6 March 1967 (age 59) Buenos Aires, Argentina
- Party: Justicialist Party
- Other political affiliations: Frente de Todos (since 2019); Front for Victory (until 2019)
- Education: University of Buenos Aires; Latin American Faculty of Social Sciences

Gabriel Nicolás Katopodis (Greek: Γαβριήλ Κατωπόδης; Spanish pronunciation: [ɡaˈβɾjel nikoˈlas katoˈpoðis]; born 6 March 1967) is an Argentine lawyer and politician, who served as the country's Minister of Public Works from 2019 to 2023, in the cabinet of President Alberto Fernández. From 2011 to 2019, Katopodis was intendente (mayor) of General San Martín, a partido in the Greater Buenos Aires metropolitan area.

Since 2023, he has served as Minister of Public Works of Buenos Aires Province, under Governor Axel Kicillof.

== Early life and education ==
Gabriel Katopodis was born in 1967 in the uptown Buenos Aires neighborhood of Belgrano to a family of Greek background. He studied law at the University of Buenos Aires and became involved in political activism through his work in poor neighbourhoods of the Buenos Aires Province.

He has a postgraduate degree in public management from FLACSO and a master's degree in public administration from the University of Buenos Aires School of Economics.

== Political career ==
Katopodis's public service career began in 2003, during the presidency of Néstor Kirchner, when he worked in the Ministry of Social Development. From 2005 to 2008 he was Undersecretary of Operation Co-ordination in the provincial Ministry of Social Development of Buenos Aires Province under Governor Felipe Solá.

In 2007 he ran for the mayoralty of General San Martín, losing in the primaries against incumbent mayor Ricardo Ivoskus.

=== Intendencia of General San Martín ===
In 2011, Katopodis ran for the mayoralty of San Martín for a second time, this time against Daniel Ivoskus, the incumbent mayor's son. Katopodis won in an upset victory by just 7 percentage points. He ran under the Frente Social ticket, aligning himself to the ruling Front for Victory.

Katopodis was re-elected for a second term in 2015, this time beating former mayor Ricardo Ivoskus. Noteworthy achievements of his second term in the mayoralty include the inauguration of a municipality-run safe space for women fleeing gender-based violence in 2018, and the inauguration of the Metrobus North Line on Route 8 in 2019.

In 2019 he ran for a third term, this time on the Frente de Todos ticket, and was elected with 54.85% of the popular vote, becoming the most voted mayor in the history of General San Martín.

=== Ministry of Public Works ===
On 6 December 2019, the newly elected president of Argentina, Alberto Fernández, announced the entirety of his incoming cabinet, in which Katopodis was touted to be the new Minister of Public Works. He assumed the position alongside the rest of the cabinet on 10 December 2019. His deputy in the mayoralty, Fernando Moreira, took his position as intendente upon his appointment in the ministry.

In 2020 he denounced that the previous administration had amassed a $ 35,000-million debt on public works, and up to 60% of all ongoing works were completely paralyzed. Katopodis stated that due to the accumulated debt, the ministry's priorities would be federal integration, job creation, and the completion of ongoing works.

Following the end of his term, he was appointed Minister of Public Works of Buenos Aires Province, under Governor Axel Kicillof.

== Personal life ==
Katopodis is married to Nancy Cappelloni, a school teacher and politician, with whom he has two children. Since the 1980s the Katopodis household has lived in San Martín, part of the Greater Buenos Aires metropolitan area. He is a supporter of Boca Juniors.

Katopodis observes the Greek Orthodox faith.

Political offices
Preceded by Ricardo Ivoskus	Mayor of General San Martín; 2011–2019	Succeeded by Fernando Moreira
Preceded by Rogelio Frigerio	Minister of Public Works; 2019–2023	Succeeded by Guillermo Ferraro
Preceded by Leonardo Nardini	Minister of Public Works of Buenos Aires; 2023–present	Incumbent
