= Brazil–Lithuania relations =

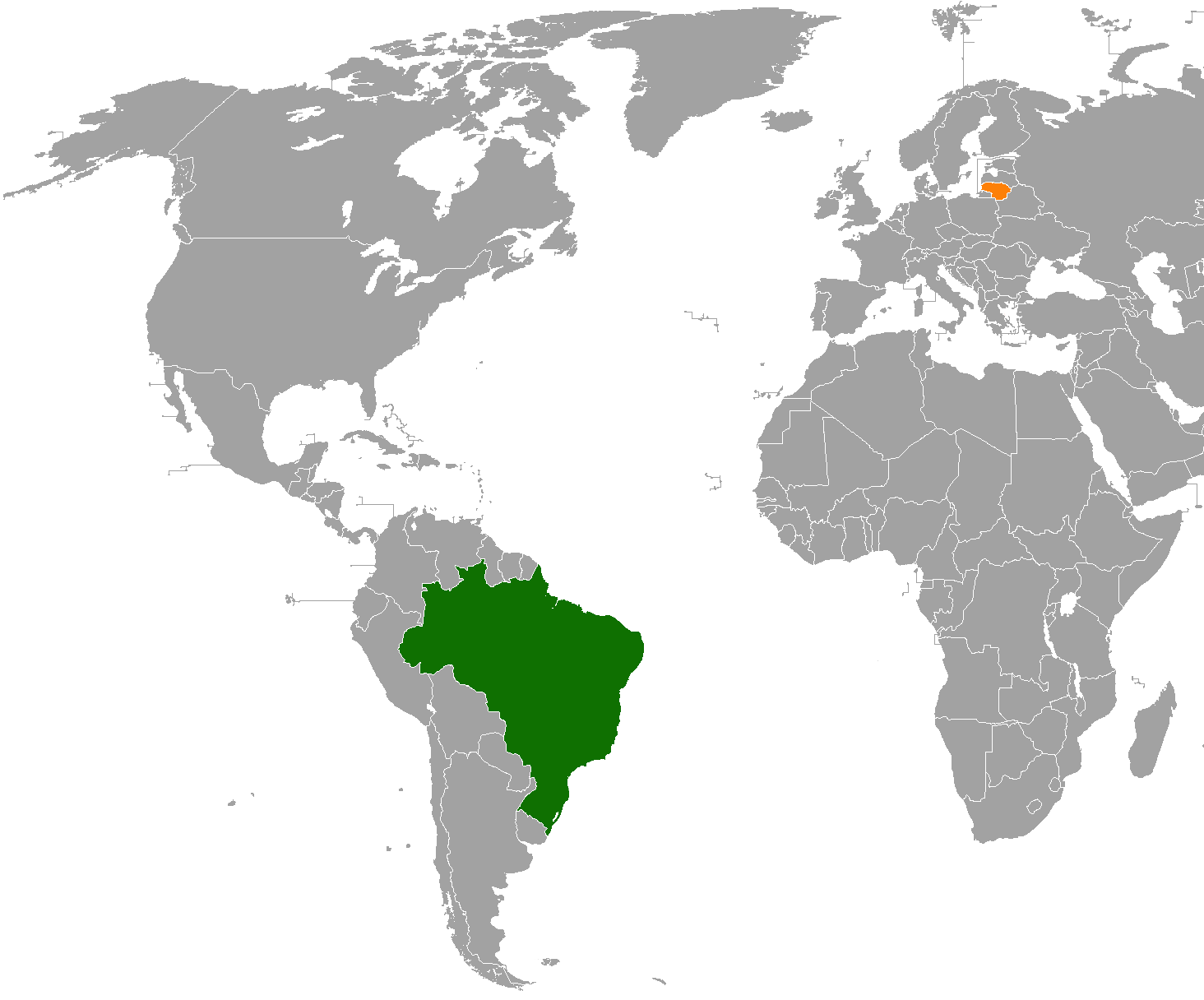

- Brazil: Lithuania

Brazil–Lithuania relations are the bilateral relations between Brazil and Lithuania.

== History ==
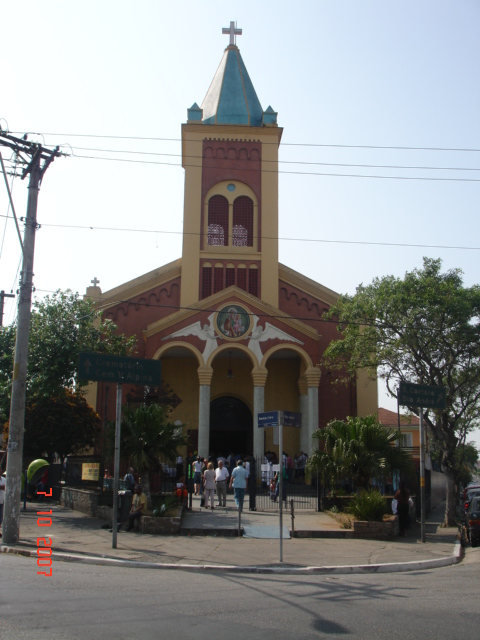
Igreja São José (St Joseph's Church) founded in 1936 by the Lithuanian Community in Vila Zelina, São Paulo, Brazil.

The first Lithuanian to set foot on Brazilian soil, according to a record dated in 1866, was a certain colonel Andrius Višteliauskas. His mission was to aid the Brazilian armed forces in the Paraguayan War that was going on at that time. Višteliauskas' experience in Brazil may have influenced people in his homeland, perhaps by his writings or perhaps after he traveled home. A few years later, a group of Lithuanian immigrants and their families arrived in Brazil. In 1890, twenty-five Lithuanian families entered the land of Brazil. Their destination was the newly established colony of Ijuí, situated on the red and fertile soil of the northwestern part of the state of Rio Grande do Sul. Between 1920 and 1930, there was a community of 30,000 Lithuanians residing in Brazil.

In 1921, Brazil recognized Lithuania's independence, however, Lithuania was occupied and incorporated into the Soviet Union in 1944. Brazil re-recognized Lithuania's independence on 5 November 1991 after the Dissolution of the Soviet Union.

In March 1996, Lithuanian Prime Minister, Algirdas Brazauskas, made an official visit to Brazil. In November 2002, Brazilian Foreign Minister, Celso Lafer, visited Lithuania. In July 2008, Lithuanian President, Valdas Adamkus, made an official visit to Brazil and signed an Agreement of Cultural Cooperation between the two nations. In June 2012, Lithuanian President, Dalia Grybauskaitė, paid a visit to Brazil to attend the United Nations Conference on Sustainable Development in Rio de Janeiro.

In 2011, Brazil opened an honorary consulate in Vilnius. In 2012, Lithuania closed its embassy in Buenos Aires, Argentina (its only embassy in Latin America), and opened a consulate-general in São Paulo soon afterwards. São Paulo is the second largest community in the Lithuanian diaspora in Latin America, after Buenos Aires.

In 2026, Foreign Affairs Committee of Seimas voted to recommend commencing establishment of an embassy in Brazil to represent bilateral relations with Mercosur and Latin American countries.

== Diaspora ==
Between 200,000 and 300,000 Brazilians are of Lithuanian descent, making Brazil the second country with the largest Lithuanian community abroad (after the United States).

== Resident diplomatic missions ==
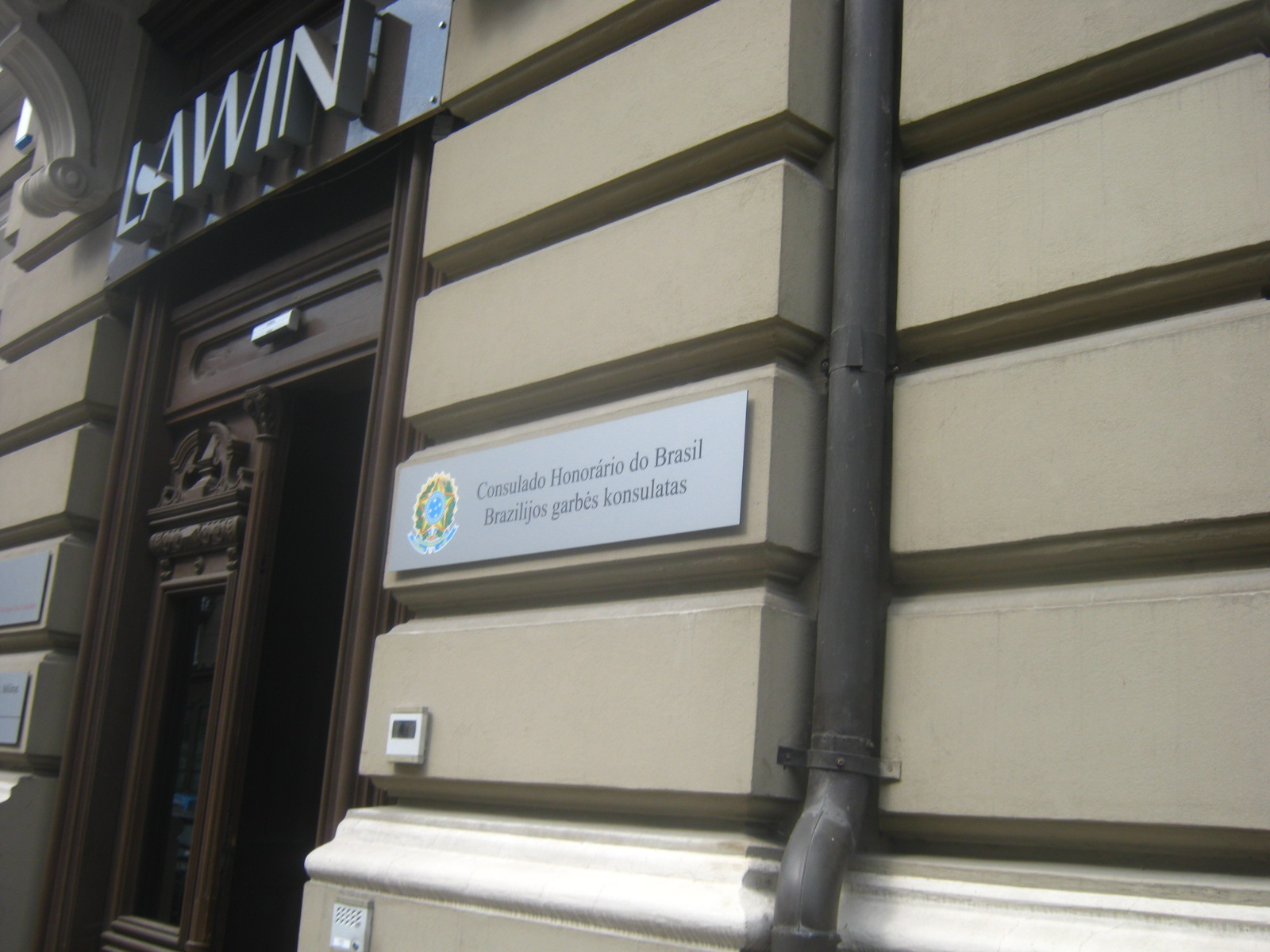
Honorary consulate of Brazil in Vilnius

- Brazil is accredited to Lithuania from its embassy in Copenhagen, Denmark and maintains an honorary consulate in Vilnius.
- Lithuania has a consulate-general in São Paulo.

== See also ==
- Foreign relations of Brazil
- Foreign relations of Lithuania
- Lithuanian Brazilians
