= Nicolás Gallo =

Nicolás Gallo may refer to:

- Nicolás Gallo (politician)
- Nicolás Gallo (referee)
