= Suitcase scandal =

Scandal involving Venezuela and Argentina

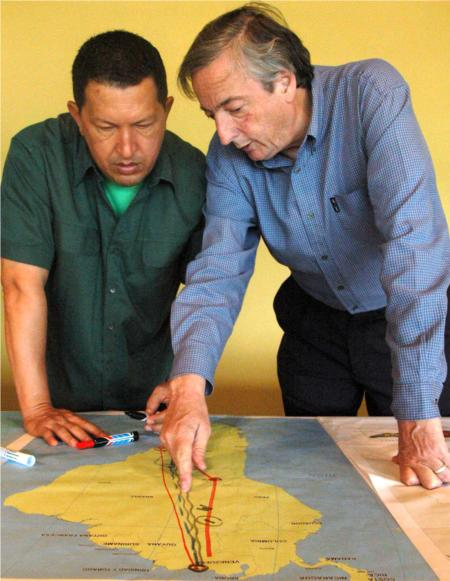
Venezuelan President Hugo Chávez and Argentinian President Néstor Kirchner in 2005.

The Maletinazo, Valijagate, or suitcase scandal was a 2007 scandal involving Venezuela and Argentina, souring friendship between the countries.

The scandal began when Guido Alejandro Antonini Wilson, a Venezuelan-US entrepreneur, arrived in Argentina on a private flight, hired by Argentine and Venezuelan state officials, carrying US$800,000 in cash which he failed to declare.

Venezuela had enacted strict foreign currency controls in 2003. CADIVI, the commission established by the Venezuelan government to regulate currency, prohibits taking more than US$10,000 in cash out of the country without declaring the money. Individual Venezuelans could only take US$500 or €400 cash out of the country in a single trip and there was a yearly quota of US$2,500 on credit card expenditures; a special government permit is needed to take additional US dollars out of the country.

The scandal escalated with suggestions that: Wilson was part of Venezuelan President Hugo Chávez's personal entourage; the money was meant to help finance, and thus influence, the Argentine presidential candidate Cristina Fernández de Kirchner; the money was meant to bribe Argentine officials in energy deals for Venezuelan natural gas; or, the suitcase was intended for money-laundering. No allegations were proven and the case was closed in 2015 due to the statute of limitations.

The scandal gained further notoriety when María del Luján Telpuk, the Argentine airport police officer who discovered the unreported currency, posed naked a few months later in the Argentine and Venezuelan versions of Playboy magazine.

The word Maletinazo comes from maletín (the Spanish word for suitcase or briefcase) and the suffix -azo which implies intensity or magnitude. The scandal is also known as Valijagate, Maletagate and Maletíngate (following the -gate construction and the Spanish word maleta or valija for suitcase or briefcase).

== Background ==
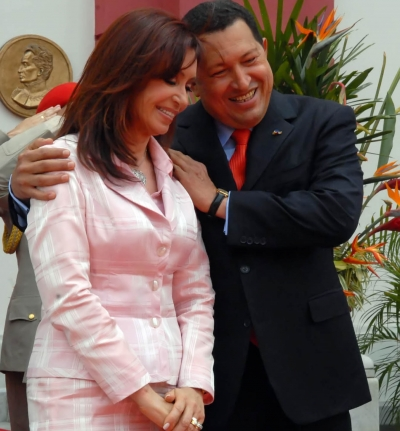
Cristina Fernández de Kirchner with Hugo Chávez.

President Hugo Chávez was planning to visit Argentina in August 2007 to refinance billions of United States dollars in Argentine debt through bond purchases and announce a natural gas deal.

On 4 August 2007, Guido Alejandro Antonini Wilson, a Venezuelan-US entrepreneur of Chávez's entourage, arrived in Argentina on a private plane chartered from Royal Class by Argentine and Venezuelan state officials, carrying US$790,550 in cash. He did not declare the money upon arrival and the police seized the money. Other Venezuelan passengers on the plane included Ruth Behrens, Petróleos de Venezuela S.A. (PDVSA) representative in Uruguay; Nelly Cardozo, legal assessor of that company; Wilfredo Ávila, a protocol official; Daniel Uzcategui Specht, son of PDVSA vice-president Diego Uzcateguil, and Maria Isabel Specht, Technology and Engineering Manager of Citgo Petroleum Corporation in Houston, Texas. Others on that flight were Exequiel Espinosa, president of Enarsa, Claudio Uberti of OCCOVI (Argentina's Highway Commission), and Victoria Bereziuk, Uberti's secretary. Although officials originally called it a simple infraction and released Antonini Wilson, both Argentine and Venezuelan officials called for an investigation.

Chávez arrived in Argentina on 6 August 2007, as part of a tour to sign oil deals with several South American countries. Antonini Wilson attended the signing ceremony between the presidents of Argentina and Venezuela that took place in the presidential palace, also known as the Casa Rosada. On 8 August 2007, the Argentine senate demanded a report on the incident. An Argentine judge later ordered the arrest of Antonini Wilson and he faced charges for money laundering and contraband.

As investigations began, Antonini Wilson fled to the United States and arrived in Miami.

== Investigation ==
Initially, Argentine judge Marta Novatti took the case but she quickly resigned from the investigation. The Argentine government fired one of the state officials who was on the plane, the head of Road Deal Controls, Claudio Uberti. Argentine Minister of Planning, Julio de Vido (who would be later indicted and jailed for corruption), declared that Uberti was the "political responsible for that flight"; Uberti was fired. The Argentine minister of interior, Fernández, declared the Senate's attempts to ask for a report on an individual, even if it is a crime case. He said the demand was politically motivated (referring to upcoming elections in Argentina).

Venezuela's PDVSA announced an internal investigation to determine why four of their officials were traveling with Antonini Wilson.

On 13 August 2007, Federal judge Diego Zysman stepped aside from the case, becoming the second judge to renounce investigating the case. Judge Novatti was notified by the Judicial Chamber of Economic Cases on 14 August 2007, that she had to take back the case.

The Bolivian government declared the plane carrying Antonini Wilson to Buenos Aires only flew over Bolivia and did not land there, after some suggestions by Venezuelan officials that the money might have come from Bolivia (it would have been illegal to take that amount of money from Venezuela under current currency control laws).

According to documents from the Supreme Court of Justice of Venezuela from 8 December 2004, an associate of Antonini, sold police equipment through a Venezuelan company Ruibal & Duran to the governor of Cojedes state, Johny Yánez, who days before declared that he did not have anything to do with Antonini. Clarín newspaper said Antonini had accompanied Yánez on a visit to Uruguay in September 2006.

Argentina sent an arrest warrant to Interpol for the arrest of Antonini; Interpol released a capture order for the offense of fraud.

The investigation in Argentina generated doubt regarding the behavior of members of the Kirchner administration. The investigation is also trying to determine why Enarsa spent $90,000 for a charter flight, and why Antonini Wilson was allowed to leave Argentina outbound to Uruguay.

=== Antonini Wilson involvement ===
According to El Nuevo Herald and El Universal, Antonini Wilson owned a condo in Ocean Club, Key Biscayne, Florida; together with Wladimir Abad, he is registered as owner of a building located in Mashta Avenue, in Key Biscayne, valued at $US3.96 million. Wladimir Abad is the secretary of American Food Grain (AFG), a part of a Venezuelan holding called Proarepa, owned by Sarkis Arslanian Beyloune and Ricardo Fernández Barrueco. Proarepa was in charge of the food distribution during Venezuela's oil strike of 2002, when Chávez signed contracts for food distribution. According to the Venezuelan Government Press Office, Proarepa is a private company that has "joined this mission (Mission Mercal) to offer food and better price to the Venezuelan consumer". According to El Nuevo Herald, Antonini Wilson's name was linked to other companies in southern Florida, such as Venuz Supply Inc., Intertel Telecom and Techmilk Inc.; La Nación says that Antonini was among a group of businessmen who benefited economically during the administration of Hugo Chávez. In May 2007, the U.S. Drug Enforcement Administration (DEA) confiscated a jet belonging to American Food Grain. The report, according to The Miami Herald, says Ricardo Fernández Barruecos had not respected federal norms to register the plane in the United States.

Beginning in late August 2007, Antonini Wilson cooperated with the Federal Bureau of Investigation. While wearing a covert listening device Wilson was approached by two Venezuelan businessmen; Carlos Kauffmann and Franklin Durán, Moisés Maiónica a Venezuelan lawyer and José Canchica of Venezuela's spy agency, the National Directorate of Intelligence and Prevention Services (DISIP). The individuals were recorded attempting to coerce Antonini Wilson to not reveal details about the funding conspiracy.

In November 2007, Antonini Wilson met with Maiónica, who was described as a member of Hugo Chávez's "team of fixers". Maiónica said in a recording that money buying Antonini Wilson's silence could not be wired into the United States by PDVSA, so DISIP direct Henry Rangel Silva was using a "secret fund" to send a cash payment. The lawyer also asked Antonini Wilson to sign for a $2 million receipt so Rangel Silva had proof that the cash was delivered and would not be accused of keeping the money for himself. Finally, Maiónica said that Chávez asked PDVSA director Rafael Ramírez to manage the hush money, but later decided on Rangel Silva.

In December 2007, the St. Petersburg Times reported that, according to prosecutors, "Antonini was delivering the money to the election campaign of Argentine President Cristina Fernandez", with "Venezuelan and Argentine officials accusing Washington of fabricating a scandal to destabilize left-wing governments in the region." The Wall Street Journal also reported that: "U.S. prosecutors in Miami announced the arrest of three Venezuelans and a Uruguayan who allegedly schemed to silence Mr. Antonini about the Venezuelan contribution to the Kirchner campaign. An indictment charges the men—and a fifth who is a fugitive—with operating as Venezuelan agents unlawfully, without having notified the U.S. attorney general. In a court hearing, a U.S. attorney said Mr. Antonini is now cooperating with the investigation and wore a wire to record subsequent encounters with the alleged Venezuelan agents, who offered him $2 million in hush money, while also threatening his family if he didn't keep quiet."

=== Alleged involvement of Cristina Fernández de Kirchner ===
On 13 December 2007 the Federal Bureau of Investigation (FBI) arrested three Venezuelans and one Uruguayan, accusing them of being agents of the Venezuelan government who intended for Antonini to help cover up the scandal over the money that was intended for "a candidate" in the Argentine presidential elections of 2007.

The Assistant U.S. Attorney in charge of the case, Thomas Mulvihill, said that one of the arrested individuals, Franklin Durán, had declared that the money was for the then-presidential candidate Cristina Fernández de Kirchner. The Ambassador of the United States to Argentina assured that the event had nothing to do with the Argentina-United States relations. Cristina Fernández de Kirchner responded to the investigation led by the United States by dubbing it "operación basura" (a "trashing operation").

Details of the case were explained by businessman Carlos Kauffmann and lawyer Moisés Maiónica, with both testifying against Durán and pleading guilty to conspiracy. The two testified that the $800,000 was sent from Venezuela through PDVSA to fund Cristina Fernández de Kirchner's campaign, with the plot being orchestrated by Venezuela's National Directorate of Intelligence and Prevention Services.

== Reaction ==
On 18 August 2007, President Chávez declared he had nothing to hide. There was little coverage of the scandal in Venezuela and Henry Rangel Silva, who was named as being involved in the controversy, was promoted to chief of the National Bolivarian Armed Forces of Venezuela.

The Venezuelan ambassador in Buenos Aires declared that Antonini Wilson had nothing to do with the Venezuelan embassy.

Argentine President Néstor Kirchner declared his government had nothing to do with the affair, and that there was no coverup. Venezuela's Minister of Foreign Affairs declared during the third meeting of Petrocaribe, "why is there such a scandal? Every day things like this happen in all the countries of the world". He said the reason for the publicity was that "some powerful people in Washington are very nervous because we are progressing in giant steps towards the union of South American countries, of the Caribbean union. They are afraid and they tremble".

The head of PDVSA, Ramírez, declared "the media is trying to put PDVSA in a bad light for events that are 'completely false'", referring to the recent denouncements of corruption at the state oil company. He said "we see how there is premeditated attempt to publicly lynch our institution and our workers for facts that have not been supported or proved". The second vice-president of Venezuela's parliament, Roberto Hernández, declared on 10 August 2007 that those PDVSA managers who accompanied Antonini Wilson should be fired.

The crisis prompted the Argentine government to ask Chávez to fire the person responsible for PDVSA in Argentina. The PDVSA official's son had accompanied Antonini Wilson to the flight. Other high officials from the Venezuelan and Argentine governments were present.

The Venezuelan Minister of Interior declared that if there were a crime in cooperation with public functionaries, "the State does not have to assume any responsibility because responsibility is individual". He said it is false the Argentine government was asking for the vice-president of PDVSA—Diego Uzcátegui, whose son was traveling with Guido Antonini—to be fired.
