= 2019 opening of regular sessions of the National Congress of Argentina =

Speech by Argentine president Mauricio Macri

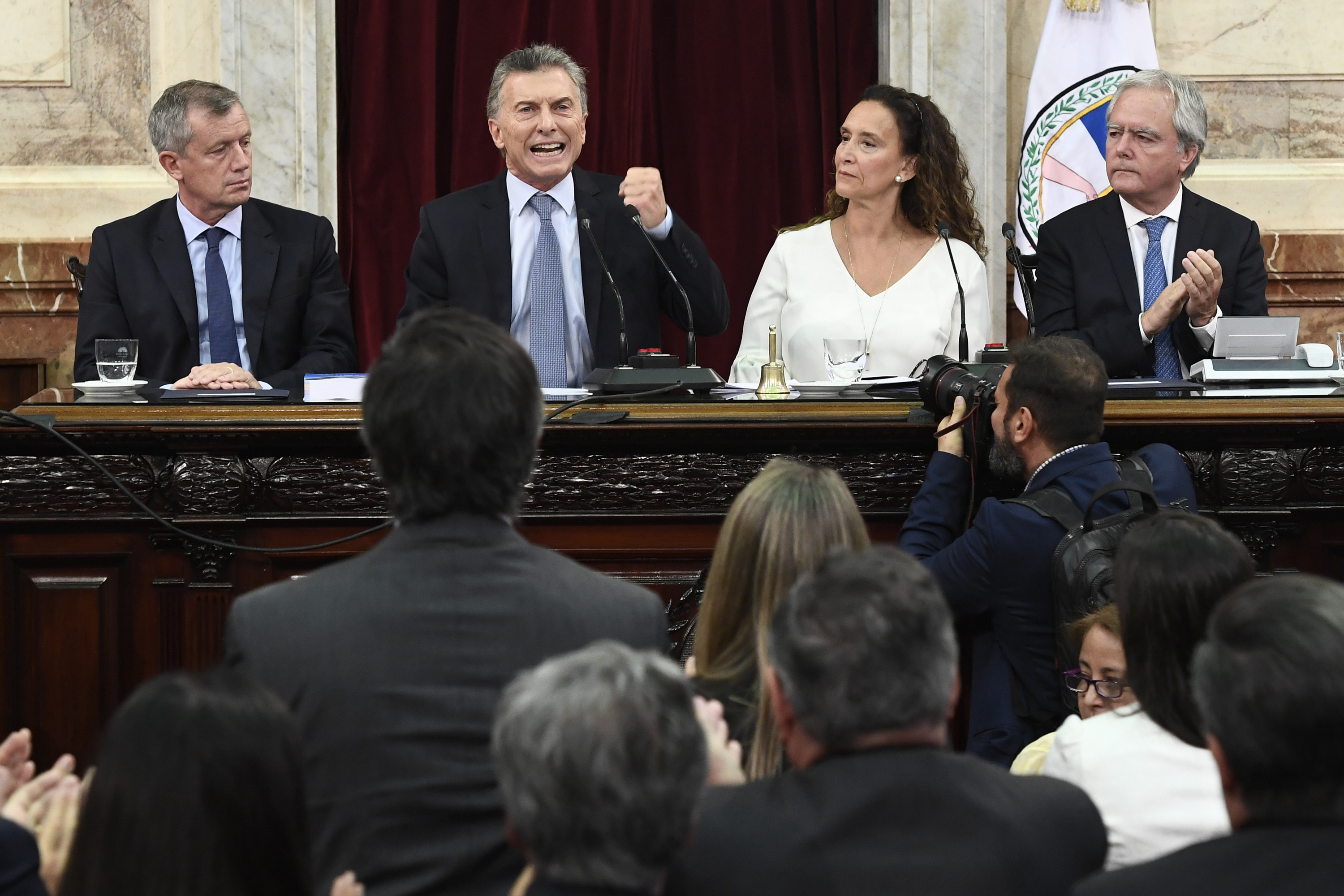
- President Mauricio Macri delivers his speech.
- Date: March 1, 2019
- Venue: National Congress of Argentina
- Location: Buenos Aires
- Type: Opening of regular sessions of the National Congress of Argentina
- Participants: Mauricio Macri

The 2019 opening of regular sessions of the National Congress of Argentina took place on March 1, 2019. It was a speech delivered by president Mauricio Macri at the National Congress of Argentina.

== Contents and delivery ==
=== Economy ===
Mauricio Macri acknowledged that the economy was not doing well, and attributed it to the 2018 capital flight, the drought that reduced the soy exports, and the Notebook scandal. He also pointed that inflation decreased and that 700,000 new jobs were created.

=== Crime ===
Mauricio Macri pointed a bill to amend the Penal Code of Argentina, considering that the current one would be outdated and of limited use. He also proposed to reduce the age of criminal responsibility from 16 to 15 years. He also praised the work of his government against crime and illegal drug trade.

== Responses ==
The opposing legislators placed banners in protest at their seats. Kirchnerite legislators used banners proposing the hashtag "Hay otro camino" (Spanish: "There is another way"), in reference to the 2019 Argentine general election. Left wing parties used their banners to protest the IMF loan, the firings at some firms, and the role of the United States in the 2019 Venezuelan presidential crisis.
