= Ministry of Infrastructure (Argentina) =

Former government ministry of Argentina

- Ministerio de Infraestructura
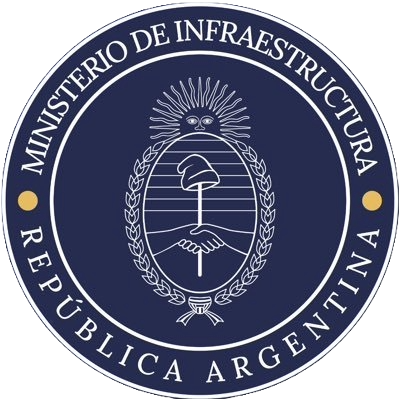

Ministry overview
- Formed: 29 December 2023
- Preceding agencies: Ministry of Public Works; Ministry of Territorial Development and Habitat; Ministry of Transport
- Dissolved: 23 February 2024; 2 years ago
- Superseding Ministry: Ministry of Economy
- Jurisdiction: Government of Argentina
- Minister responsible: Guillermo Ferraro

The Ministry of Infrastructure (Spanish: Ministerio de Infraestructura) of Argentina was a ministry of the national executive power responsible for public works, housing, communication and transport.

Guillermo Ferraro, appointed on 10 December 2023 by Javier Milei to lead the ministry, was removed on 26 January 2024 through a presidential decree for having leaked confidential information regarding the administration. Following this, president Milei decided to abolish the ministry, moving to the status of undersecretariat.

The dissolution of the Ministry and the absorption of its competencies by the Ministry of Economy was officially announced by the government on 23 February 2024.

== History ==
Before the election of Javier Milei, the areas of public works, transport and housing each had their own ministry within the Government of Argentina. Communications were already the responsibility of a secretariat. During his campaign, Milei promised to reduce the number of existing ministries and create two new ministries which would bring together several areas of public life: Human Capital and Infrastructure. The latter can be considered as the merging of the ministries of Public Works, Transport, and Territorial Development and Habitat.

On 10 December 2023, on his very first day as President of Argentina, he modified the law through a Necessity and Urgency Decree and reduced the previous 19 government ministries to nine. As stipulated in the presidential decree, the Ministry of Infrastructure must enable the government "to optimize public works, housing, communications and transport policies". The same day, Guillermo Ferraro was then appointed head of the ministry. An accountant and a former executive for KPMG Argentina, he was part of the libertarian president's campaign team and comes from the private sector like other members of the cabinet led by Nicolás Posse.

== Organisation ==
=== List of ministers ===
No.	Minister	Party	Coalition	Term	President
1	Guillermo Ferraro	Independent	LLA	10 December 2023 – 5 March 2024	Javier Milei
