= Claudio Uberti =

Argentine government official

Claudio Uberti (born December 3, 1957) is a former Argentine government official who attained political power through personal ties to the former president Néstor Kirchner, becoming head under Kirchner of the Órgano de Control de Concesiones Viales (OCCOVI), the federal agency that regulates highway concessions.

During his tenure at OCCOVI, Uberti was also a key figure in the arrangement of trade deals between Argentine and Venezuelan firms under the Néstor Kirchner and Hugo Chávez administrations. He was described at the time as a sort of “parallel” ambassador from Buenos Aires to Caracas, and was an intimate of both Kirchner and Chávez.

Uberti gained prominence a result of the 2007 Maletinazo or "suitcase scandal", in which a suitcase containing nearly $800,000 was seized by Buenos Aires airport police from a passenger on a diplomatic flight of which Uberti was in charge. As a consequence of this seizure, Uberti was ultimately charged with smuggling, money laundering, and the solicitation of bribes. Charges against him were eventually dropped, although an FBI probe concluded that Uberti had been transporting an illegal campaign donation from Hugo Chávez to Cristina Fernandez de Kirchner.

His nicknames are “Pachi” and “Ubi.”

== Early life and education ==
Uberti was born in a town of 7000 people in the county of General Lopez in the province of Santa Fe, Argentina, on December 3, 1957. His father, Eugenio, was a construction worker and his mother Élida, was a hairdresser. His paternal grandfather had come to Buenos Aires from Italy in 1893 at age 16.

Perfil stated in October 2008 that in his hometown, Uberti, whose nickname since childhood has been “Pachi,” was “known for his 'erratic behavior' and for scams and swindles. He was “a person who was always in strange things” and whose “affection for money led him down different paths.” One acquaintance of his youth said: “Pachi never enjoyed working, he enjoyed the good life.”

At 18 he went to Rosario to study law, but left in his third year while working at a bank. During his time in Rosario, he tried to sell a car for which he did not have the proper papers. He also caused a local scandal by gaining access to a professor's house by pretending to be her boyfriend, an incident which landed him in jail. On one occasion in the late 1970s, he pushed a girlfriend off a balcony, almost killing her, and again ended up in the Rosario jail. After his release, he “took refuge” in Santa Cruz.

Eventually he moved to Rio Gallegos, where he worked as an installer of ceramic tiles. He met his wife, Patricia Palacios, there. It was also in Rio Gallegos that he met and befriended Rudy Ulloa, the driver for Néstor Kirchner. Uberti, Ulloa, and Julio de Vido worked together to raise funds for Néstor Kirchner's 2003 election campaign.

== OCCOVI ==
When Néstor Kirchner became president, Uberti was named head of OCCOVI. He reported to his friend Julio de Vido, who had been installed as Minister of Planning. Founded in 2003, OCCOVI controlled all freeway concessions and was in charge of collecting the tolls on every toll road, highway, and bridge in the country. As head of OCCOVI, he was known jocularly as “el señor de los peajes,” or “the lord of the tolls.” Cronista reported in August 2007 that his contacts in politics and business universally described him as an “obedient” Kirchnerist “soldier.”

While holding the position at OCCOVI, Uberti was in charge of Argentine negotiations with the Venezuelan government involving agreements about energy, farm machinery, and other matters. Uberti has been described as having served at the time as a sort of “parallel ambassador” from Argentina to Venezuela who was on intimate terms with both Néstor Kirchner and Hugo Chávez. According to one source, “Uberti was present at every single agreement signing between the Argentine Government and Hugo Chávez.” Eduardo Arnold, former first vice president of the Chamber of Deputies and former vice governor of the province of Santa Cruz, later said that “Uberti was nobody in Santa Cruz” but in Venezuela “he was the master of ceremonies. He would not knock on the door, but kick it and come in.” In June 2010, Clarin reported on a secret cable in which Arnold confirmed that he had traveled to Caracas with Uberti and de Vito in April 2005, and that their activities there had been kept secret from the then Argentine ambassador to Venezuela, Eduardo Sadous.

Residents of his hometown said that after Uberti became a part of the national government, he did a great deal to help the area.

In February 2008, after the Maletizano scandal made him a household name, the magazine Noticias published an article about “the quick fortune acquired by Claudio Uberti.” The article said that Uberti's story “shows that an unemployed man can become a millionaire without having to look for work; it is enough to have the necessary contacts and be a Kirchnerista.” The article stated that after six months of government employment, Uberti had “a stunning $2 million apartment on Libertador Avenue, in a top part of Palermo,” and a weekend house in an “exclusive gated community.” The article stated that after Uberti moved into the house, in the exclusive CUBA Fatima country club in Pilar, he ordered the construction of a pool, but being dissatisfied with the results he had it redone four times. According to the report, Uberti did not officially declare his ownership of the house and would not be able to afford it on his official income. “How do you live as a rich man without working?” Noticias asked, sarcastically calling Uberti's wealth “another Kirchner miracle” and noting that his total assets had been 426 pesos in 2003 and were now 187,126 pesos. An article about the report in Noticias was headlined “Claudio Uberti, or how to make a fortune in the shadow of Kirchner and Chávez.”

== Maletinazo ==
On August 4, 2007, Uberti and his secretary, Victoria Bereziuk, arrived in Buenos Aires on a private flight from Caracas transporting Argentine and Venezuelan government officials who were in Argentina to sign a trade deal relating to the building of pipelines. Uberti had been instrumental in arranging the deal and was in charge of the flight. Among the passengers was Venezuelan-US businessman Guido Alejandro Antonini Wilson, who claimed to be part of Hugo Chávez's entourage, and whose suitcase, seized by police at the airport, turned out to contain US$790,550 in cash, which he had not declared. The discovery of the money in the suitcase caused an immediate scandal, and Uberti was promptly asked to resign from his position as head of OCCOVI. His superior, Minister of Planning Julio de Vido, explained that Uberti had been in charge of the plane and should not have allowed Wilson to fly on it. “The aircraft was joined by people who were not part of the initial delegation,” de Vido said. It was reported later in August that Uberti had left the country 27 times in 12 months, and had always used the military sector of the airport.

Despite de Vido's demand that Uberti step down, it was apparently widely understood that de Vido “must have known about the illegal transfer” of funds, “since those familiar with the Kirchner regime say that nothing happens without De Vido’s approval.” One report suggested that there was “reason to believe that this has not been the first cash transfer and that we are talking about cash smuggling on a larger scale.” The report noted several apparent irregularities about the flight, which had been chartered by ENARSA, Argentina’s state oil and gas company. It had landed not at Ezeiza International Airport, where most international flights to Buenos Aires land, but at Aeroparque, and it had landed at 2:30 AM, when that airport is usually closed, requiring a special order to open the airport for the flight and to arrange for the presence of customs officials. Also, the first judge assigned to the case, Marta Novatti, resigned, protesting that she had been harassed by the Kirchnerista customs director, Ricardo Echegaray.

As a result of the seizure of the suitcase of money, Uberti was accused of smuggling and, later, of money laundering. Uberti said at a hearing on February 1, 2008, before Maria Luz Rivas Diez, prosecutor for economic crime, that Diego Uzcátegui Matheus, vice-president of the state oil firm PDVSA, had introduced him to Wilson at a luncheon on August 3, 2007, the day before the flight. “I had never before had any contact or relation with him,” claimed Uberti, who also stated, “I do not know either the origin or the destination of the money confiscated from Antonini Wilson.” In an August 2011 radio interview, Wilson called Uberti a “criminal” and said that the suitcase of money with which he had been caught was not his but Uberti's. He said that the PDVSA head had introduced him to Uberti, “the third man of Argentina,” and that he, Wilson, did not like the looks of Uberti. At the airport, where, he said, Bereziuk had given Uberti “two kisses like the mafiosos,” Bereziuk had asked Wilson to help her with a suitcase. This, Wilson said in the 2011 interview, was the suitcase that had been seized from him by the police at the airport.

An investigation by the FBI resulted in the conclusion that the money in Wilson's suitcase had been a contribution by Hugo Chávez to Cristina Fernández de Kirchner's 2007 presidential election campaign. She called this claim “garbage.” Other theories proposed in the media were that the money was intended for pro-Chávez groups in Argentina, was “a kickback to Argentine government officials for a business deal,” was “a bribe for ENARSA,” or that “some renegade PDVSA officials wanted to get some cash out of the party, creating personal reserves for a foreseeable end of the Venezuelan bonanza.”

Argentina's own investigation proved inconclusive. In June 2012, justices dismissed the case against Uberti. In July 2012, the Cámara Nacional en lo Penal Económico (National Economic Criminal Chamber) closed its investigation of Maletinazo. Periodico Tribuna charged that various authorities had taken actions to prevent Uberti's conviction. The charges against him had been changed to his benefit, and the investigation had been dropped by the Kirchnerist head of the Prosecutions Division of Customs, Federico Machesich, who at the time was a law partner of Uberti's old friend, Marcelo Goldberg. Periodico Tribuna also noted that Uberti's attorney was Diego Pirota, who also represented Vice President Amado Boudou in Boudougate.

== Sadous and Carrió charges ==
Eduardo Sadous, a former Argentine Ambassador to Venezuela, claimed in 2010 that Argentine businessmen had been forced to pay bribes to the Planning Ministry during Néstor Kirchner's administration. In April of that year, apropos of Sadous's charges, Elisa Carrió, leader of the Civic Coalition, stated that the money acquired in this manner had been “sent to Kirchner” and that Uberti had been in charge of collecting the money and giving it to Kirchner. She said that “15 percent [of the bribe money] was to negotiate with Venezuela and 10 percent was for Uberti to keep.” She said that this arrangement explained “why Uberti was constantly traveling to the country.” She said that the money seized from Antonini Wilson at the Buenos Aires airport in Maletinazo had been only one of many sums that had been clandestinely transported in such a manner. “The suitcase,” as she put it, “appeared to be something permanent; they were not only entering the country to finance a presidential campaign.” De Vido called these accusations “infamous.”

Uberti sued Sadous on June 28, 2010, accusing him of perjury. Uberti asked Federal Judge Rodolfo Canicoba Corral to examine testimony Sadous had given before Federal Judge Julián Ercolini, in the course of which Sadous had made his charges about the alleged bribery. Uberti maintained that there were contradictions in Sadous's testimony, and asked Canicoba Corral to summon Sadous to testify.

== Later activities ==
Perfil reported on August 4, 2012, that five years after the Wilson scandal, Uberti was still involved in oil transactions with Venezuela, advising firms on oil deals with PDVSA. As of 2012, according to Perfil, he was under investigation to determine whether he was involved in a scheme to force bribes out of Argentine businessmen who wanted to export goods to Venezuela.

In December 2013, federal prosecutor Carlos Rivolo asked Judge Sebástian Casanello to try Uberti and Ricardo Jaime, former Minister of Transportation, because Uberti, as head of OCCoVI, had allowed Jaime to use as his own a Honda Civic owned by OCCAVI.

== Personal life ==
Uberti and his wife have three children, María Florencia, Claudio, and María Cecilia.
