= María del Luján Telpuk =

Former airport police officer from Argentina

- Born: c. 1981 (age c. 44–45)
- Other names: Lorena Telpuk
- Occupations: Teacher, policewoman, model
- Known for: Maletinazo
- Height: 5 ft 5 in (1.65 m)
- Parent: Yolanda (mother)

Lorena Telpuk, formerly María del Luján Telpuk (sometimes María de Luján Telpuk) or the Suitcase Girl (born c. 1981), is a former airport police officer at Aeroparque Jorge Newbery in Buenos Aires, Argentina. She is best known for noticing a suitcase with US$800,000 as it went through an X-ray machine in August 2007, initiating a very public international election scandal, known as Maletinazo.

When the suitcase scandal became public, Telpuk became an international celebrity, appearing on the cover of several magazines, including those of the February 2008 issue of the Argentine edition of Playboy magazine and the March 2008 issue of the Venezuelan edition of Playboy magazine.

In 2008, she changed her name to Lorena Telpuk, had breast augmentation surgery, and continued to pose for adult modeling photographs and derive income from her notoriety. She became involved in larger political struggles between the US government and leftist Latin American leaders, receiving death threats requiring police protection, and testifying in court regarding her involvement in the case.

== Personal ==
Telpuk is a former nursery school teacher. She was raised in a small town in the Santa Fe Province where she taught nursery school, but she moved to Buenos Aires after passing an entrance exam for the Airport Security Police about three years prior to the Maletinazo incident. In the short time since Telpuk has transformed from night shift policewoman to pinup girl almost overnight. She has left the police force, joined a charter airline, begun taking English classes and begun to prepare for a role on Skating for a Dream, an Argentine variety show.

Telpuk's mother Yolanda lives in a middle-class suburb of Buenos Aires. She is widowed and used to work for a pasta factory.

== Maletinazo ==
On August 4, 2007, at 2:45 a.m., she discovered the money that became part of a political scandal in the electoral campaign of Cristina Fernández de Kirchner, the President of Argentina. It was in the possession of a Key Biscayne, Florida resident Guido Antonini Wilson, who was referred to in the press as both Antonini, and Wilson, or sometimes by the nicknames "El Gordo" or "The Fat Man". Wilson is an interpreter, part of a delegation of executives that traveled to Argentina to prepare for the signing of an energy deal offered by Hugo Chávez, the President of Venezuela. The delegation, which arrived on a Cessna Citation jet from Caracas, Venezuela, chartered by Energía Argentina, SA, carried five Venezuelans and three Argentines who represented their respective governments' energy companies.

Telpuk noticed six dense and perfectly rectangular blocks in the luggage scans. At first, Wilson explained the items as books and papers. When forced to open the suitcase, he began to stammer and show signs of nervousness, and said the suitcase only contained about $60,000. The blocks turned out to be US$790,550. In a country known for its corruption, Telpuk did not have an interest in a bribe although she felt Wilson may have expected her to be willing to take one. Instead of pursuing a bribe, she reported the finding.

Although the local media of both Venezuela and Argentina gave the story immediate front-page coverage, the case faded away until after Kirchner was elected. The United States prosecutors believe that the money represented a contribution from Venezuelan President Chávez to the presidential campaign of Argentina's leftist leader, Kirchner. Two days after the December 10, 2007 inauguration, several arrests were announced by prosecutors working for the United States Attorney General. The arrests were for activities related to having offered Wilson $2 million to keep quiet about the contributions from Venezuela to support Kirchner's campaign. In addition to Maletinazo, the case is known in Latin America as "Valijagate" or "Suitcasegate", and Telpuk is known as the Suitcase Girl in her homeland, Argentina.

For her part, Telpuk felt she was caught in the "middle of a rivalry of nations". She has been vilified as a mercenary fortune-seeker and CIA lackey. She has received a variety of threats by telephone and email and had police protection starting when the incident became a public scandal in December.

== Media appearances ==
Her first magazine cover appearance was on the December issue of an irreverent political magazine, Veintitrés where Telpuk appeared under the headline "The Bombshell Behind the Suitcase" standing behind a suitcase. She wore little other than a police cap, and another headline on the cover read, "Is She the Key Piece of a Plot Designed by Washington?" She then appeared on the February issue of the Argentine edition of Playboy magazine next to the headline "Corrupción Al Desnudo" (translated as "Corruption Laid Bare"). Subsequently, she appeared on the March 2008 issue of the Venezuelan edition of Playboy magazine. She posed with a red suitcase decorated with both the Argentine and Venezuelan flags while wearing a scarf, black leather gloves and black-and-white boots for her Playboy cover appearance. Within the magazine in her pictorial, she posed with fewer clothes and with various props: the ubiquitous suitcase, dollar bills, including the propeller blades of a single-engine airplane. She decided to pursue an appearance on the Argentine variety show "Bailando por un sueño", after Marcelo Tinelli visited her at the airport to congratulate her.

Telpuk has appeared on various talk shows since the scandal. In 2008, according to foreign language sources, she changed her name from María del Luján Telpuk to Lorena Telpuk; she was mysteriously dismissed from Skating for a Dream; and she posed for additional adult modeling photographs in Premium, an Argentine magazine. Telpuk had breast augmentation surgery prior to her late 2008 court appearances.

== Courtroom ==
Telpuk testified in court in October 2008 on various days spanning the weekend of October 5, 2008, regarding her knowledge in the famous suitcase scandal. Her October 3 testimony, wherein she contradicted the testimony of Antonini, in which he had stated that he was carrying the suitcase as a courtesy to his companions, was considered a highlight of the trial. On that day, her presence prompted a media frenzy. For her part, Telpuk took the stand to testify that she had been offered political asylum by the Federal Bureau of Investigation as well as employment in the United States in exchange for modifying her witness statement that Mr. Antonini Wilson was the owner of the suitcase that contained the $800,000. On November 3, 2008, part of the case was decided in a Miami courtroom when Franklin Durán, a wealthy businessman who allegedly conspired to cover up both the origin and the destination of the suitcase, was convicted of acting as an "unregistered agent" of Venezuela on American soil. On March 17, 2009, Durán, who was facing up to fifteen years in prison, was sentenced to four.
