= Rogelio Frigerio =

Argentine economist and politician

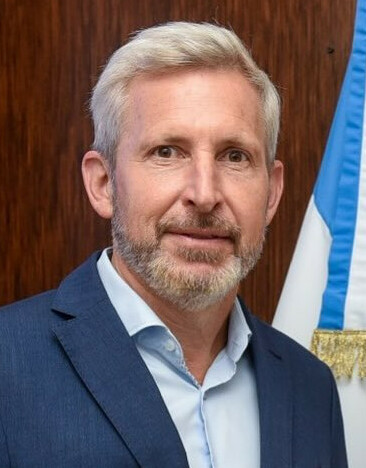
- Frigerio in 2024

Governor of Entre Ríos
- Incumbent
- Assumed office 10 December 2023
- Vice Governor: Alicia Aluani
- Preceded by: Gustavo Bordet

National Deputy
- In office 16 December 2021 – 10 December 2023
- Constituency: Entre Ríos

Minister of Interior, Public Works and Housing
- In office 10 December 2015 – 10 December 2019
- President: Mauricio Macri
- Preceded by: Florencio Randazzo
- Succeeded by: Eduardo de Pedro (Interior); Gabriel Katopodis (Public Works); María Eugenia Bielsa (Habitat)

Personal details
- Born: 7 January 1970 (age 56) Buenos Aires, Argentina
- Party: Republican Proposal
- Other political affiliations: Cambiemos (2015–present)
- Education: University of Buenos Aires
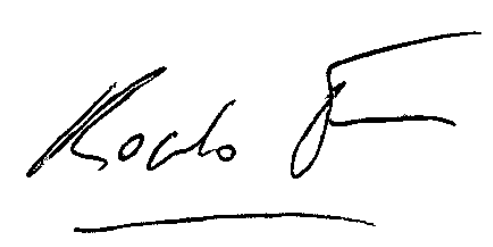
- Signature

Rogelio Frigerio (born 7 January 1970) is an Argentine economist and politician. Since 2023, he has been Governor of Entre Ríos Province.

He was Minister of Interior, Public Works and Housing during the presidency of Mauricio Macri, from 2015 to 2019. Later, from 2021 to 2023, he was a National Deputy elected in the Juntos por el Cambio list in Entre Ríos.

Frigerio is the grandson of Rogelio Julio Frigerio, one of the main political figures of 20th-century Argentina and founder of the Integration and Development Movement (MID), of which Rogelio forms part.

== Early life and education ==
Frigerio was born on 7 January 1970 in Buenos Aires, son of Octavio Frigerio, an agricultural engineer and politician, and Sisi Adam, an expert on psychophysical re-education and body language. His grandfather was Rogelio Julio Frigerio, an important journalist and politician, who was a founding member of both Intransigent Radical Civic Union (UCRI) and later the Integration and Development Movement (MID). He was also the Secretary of Socio-economic Relations at Arturo Frondizi's administration (1958-1962). He is considered to be one of the most important people in the history of Argentina's political thought, the main driving force behind the theory of developmentalism in this country. As his grandfather, Rogelio Frigerio, supports developmentalism, and is one of the main figures of the Integration and Development Movement.

He completed his secondary studies at Goethe Schule and holds a degree in Business Administration from the University of Buenos Aires with a major in Planning and Economic Development (1994).

In 1985, when he was only 15 years old, Frigerio decided to become active in the MID as a prelude to his future political career.

== Politics ==
His career in the public sector began during the government of President Carlos Menem, in 1998 - at the age of 28 - was appointed for a year Secretary of Economic Programming of Roque Fernández, the Minister of Economy of the Argentine Nation during the second presidency of Menem between 1995 and 1999.

In 1996, he was Undersecretary of Regional Programming.1 Between 1997 and 1999, he served as president of the Trust Fund for Provincial Development. From 1996 to 2000, he was Director of Postgraduate Business Policy at the University of Salvador1 and holder of the Permanent Forum of Budget Directorates. He founded and directed, until 2011, the consulting firm Economy & Regions.

He is also president of Federar (Foundation for Economic and Regional Development Studies in Argentina). He was the head of the Argentine Association for the Evaluation of Projects and the Studies Foundation for the Economic and Regional Development of Argentina. It was also Advisor of the OKITA Foundation and co-founder and president of the Argentine Evaluation Association.

In 2011, he was elected Legislator of the Autonomous City of Buenos Aires by the Republican Proposal (PRO), and chaired the Budget, Finance, Tax Administration and Taxation Commission of the Legislature of the Autonomous City of Buenos Aires. He became President of Bank of the City of Buenos Aires in 2013.

Mauricio Macri, elected President of Argentina in 2015, nominated him to be his Minister of Interior Affairs, Public Works and Housing.

== Minister of Interior, Public Works and Housing ==
An infrastructure plan was launched that carried out more than 5,800 works; the incorporation of more than 800 thousand people to the drinking water network and 1.5 million to the sewer network; the doubling of the installed capacity for the treatment of sewage liquids with the completion of 20 treatment plants and the commissioning of 20 more; the completion of 140 works to prevent flooding and protect more than 1.4 million people and 3 million productive hectares; the urbanization of 100 vulnerable neighborhoods; a 600% increase in investment in habitat improvement; the granting of more than 130,000 mortgage loans; the realization of 303 works in electrical networks throughout the country.

Among the most relevant works, the Matanza Riachuelo System stands out, which will benefit more than 4.5 million residents of the Metropolitan Area and will require an investment of 1,200 million dollars, financed by the World Bank.

At the same time, an agenda focused on strengthening and improving transparency indices was promoted. For the first time, bidding documents for public works began to be published online, which had an impact on greater participation of companies and, consequently, on the lowering of the costs of the works. Also, a new objective, a public and transparent allocation system for social housing called SiGeBe was developed. A national and federal registry with unified criteria for the selection of beneficiaries, with which different levels of the State and NGOs can validate the demand for housing and future awards that are made throughout the country.

The Ministry of Interior, Public Works and Housing, began a process to provide autonomy to the provinces by restoring resources and moving towards the strengthening of subnational governments. In that sense, Frigerio reached essential agreements in order to implement regulations to promote a new resource distribution scheme to strengthen federalism. Along these lines, he promoted the signing of the Fiscal Consensus that reimbursed 22 provinces the 15% of Co-participation that the Nation had withheld since 1992. Also, the increase in direct transfers of resources to the provinces, which passed 40% of the federal collection in 2015 to 49.8% in 2019. This helped the fiscal situation improve significantly: by 2015, only eight provinces showed a positive financial result. Three years later, 18 provinces exhibited surpluses.

From an institutional point of view, an agenda focused on increasing levels of transparency, electoral equity and strengthening institutions was defined. In that sense, progress was made in the adoption of fundamental laws such as the Law on Access to Public Information, the Law on the financing of political parties, the Mandatory Presidential Debate Law, the Parity Law on lists, the Presidential Transition Law (half penalty) and the Interest Management Regulation Law (half penalty). The approval of decrees to increase the democratization of political representation was promoted, such as Presidential Decree 259/2019, which eliminated the possibility of the so-called “collecting lists”.

Frigerio participated and presented the Argentine position in the following conferences: United Nations Conference on Housing and Sustainable Urban Development Habitat III; 58th Annual Meeting of the Board of Governors of the Inter-American Development Bank (IDB) and the 32nd Annual Meeting of the Board of Governors of the Inter-American Investment Corporation (IIC); Business Forum “Intelligent Integration with the World: Promoting Regional Economies and Infrastructure Investment”; III Ibero-American Forum of Mayors, within the framework of the Annual Meeting of the Board of Governors of the IDB; High-Level Meeting “Integrity for good governance in Latin America and the Caribbean: from commitments to actions (OECD); China-Latin America and Caribbean Investment Exchange (CLACIE) Meeting, Beijing, China; XXII China-LAC Business Summit, Zhuhai.

== Personal life ==
He is married to the lawyer Victoria Costoya, with whom he has two children called Máximo and Delfina.
