= Radvilas Gorauskas =

Brazilian basketball player

Personal information
- Nationality: Brazilian
- Born: 3 February 1941 Lithuania
- Died: 1983 (aged 41–42)

Sport
- Sport: Basketball

Radvilas Kasimiras Gorauskas (3 February 1941 – 1983) was a Lithuanian Brazilian basketball player. He competed in the men's tournament at the 1972 Summer Olympics. Gorauskas was of Lithuanian descent as he was born in Lithuania, but emigrated with his family to the West during the World War II and in 1947 settled in Piracicaba, Brazil.
