= Roberto José Dromi =

Argentine politician and lawyer (1945–2024)

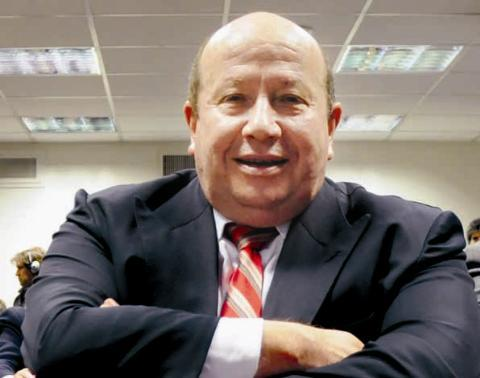

Roberto José Dromi (11 April 1945 – 23 November 2024) was an Argentine politician and lawyer, who served as Minister of Public Works of Argentina during the administration of Carlos Menem. He also served as Mayor of Mendoza between 1981 and 1982. He's been referred to as an "Argentine treatise writer" by the World Bank.

He wrote the book Derecho Administrativo, published on August 1, 1998 by Ciudad Argentina.

Dromi was professor of administrative law in many universities of Argentina. He died on 23 November 2024, at the age of 79.
