= Guillermo Ferraro =

Argentine politician (1955–2024)

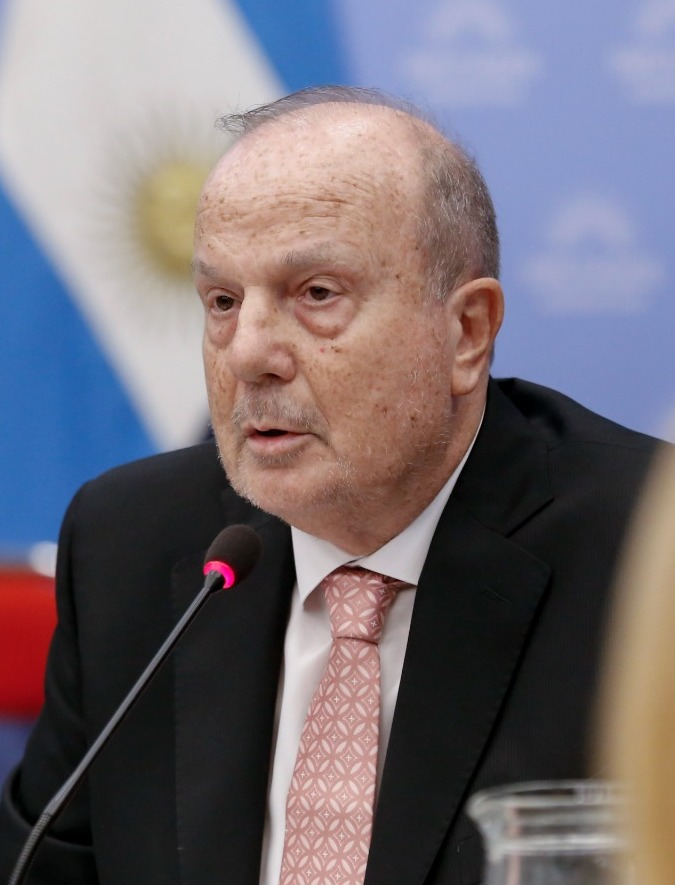
- Ferraro in 2024

Minister of Infrastructure
- In office 10 December 2023 – 5 March 2024
- President: Javier Milei

Personal details
- Born: 12 July 1955 Buenos Aires, Argentina
- Died: 4 December 2024 (aged 69) Buenos Aires, Argentina
- Education: University of Buenos Aires

Guillermo José Ferraro (Spanish pronunciation: [ɡiˈʝeɾmo xoˈse feˈraɾo]; 12 July 1955 – 4 December 2024) was an Argentine accountant, businessperson and politician who was appointed Minister of Infrastructure on 10 December 2023 by President Javier Milei. On 27 January 2024, Milei stated that Ferraro would be presenting his resignation within the next few days. Ferraro's resignation was officially accepted by the government on 5 March 2024.

Ferraro had previously served as a director of the accounting firm KPMG Argentina until 2023. He had also served as an undersecretary in Eduardo Duhalde's government from 2002 to 2003, during Duhalde's interim presidency of Argentina.

== Early life and education ==
Guillermo José Ferraro was born in Buenos Aires, Argentina on 12 July 1955.

Ferraro attended the University of Buenos Aires, from where he graduated with a degree in business administration, a doctorate in economics, and a post-graduate degree in systems engineering.

== Career ==
From 1988 to 1991, Ferraro served in the administration of Antonio Cafiero, the Justicialist governor of the province of Buenos Aires, as an undersecretary of infrastructure and telecommunications.

Between 1997 and 2001, Ferraro was the president of Coordinación Ecológica Área Metropolitana Sociedad del Estado (CEAMSE), the government-owned company that handles the municipal solid waste of both the city and the province of Buenos Aires.

From 2002 to 2003, when Eduardo Duhalde was the acting president of Argentina, Ferraro served as an undersecretary of industry in the Ministry of Industry, Commerce, and Mining.

Ferraro also worked at the accounting firm KPMG Argentina for 14 years, where he served as a director until 2023.

On 10 December 2023, Ferraro was appointed by President Javier Milei to head the newly created Ministry of Infrastructure. Amongst other things, Ferraro was tasked with privatizing many entities owned by the state, such as Ferrocarriles Argentinos, the state-owned company that manages the Argentine railway network.

On 25 January 2024, it was reported that Milei has requested Ferraro's resignation. Milei confirmed on 27 January that Ferraro would be submitting his resignation shortly. Both the Buenos Aires Herald and Perfil reported that multiple sources stated that Ferraro was pressured to resign due to allegedly leaking details of a government meeting. Foreign minister Diana Mondino said that it was likely Milei would merge the Ministry of Infrastructure into the Ministry of Economy.

== Death ==
Ferraro died in Buenos Aires on 4 December 2024, at the age of 69.
