= Franklin Durán =

Venezuelan businessman and foreign agent

Franklin Durán (born 12 September 1967 in Caracas, Venezuela) is a Venezuelan entrepreneur, implicated in the "suitcase scandal" between Argentina and Venezuela, and charged by the United States Department of Justice with being an illegal agent of a foreign government.

== Education ==
Durán attended high school at the Pedro Maria Ochoa Morales Military School in Los Teques and also at the Anzoátegui Military School. He finished his studies in the Capital Region's Technical Institute, obtaining the title of Technical Superior in Mechanics with a technology minor.

== Business ==
Durán's first big business deal was the sale of Sony equipment and microwaves to the Pepeganga chain, using a loan of $1,000,000 from the Latino Bank, thanks to an endorsement from Omar Camero. Then in 1992, Camero and Durán worked as partners in a business called Dislaca, dedicated to food imports, distributing to Procter & Gamble. In 1993 Duran bought his first aircraft, a Cessna 206.

In 1997 Duran made a successful and lucrative high-risk investment in Tyco, making $275,000 from a $20,000 investment. The same year he went to Russia with Citibank's vice-president to look for aircraft-related businesses, but came back having bought Russian bonds.

During the tragedy in the state of Vargas, Durán and his business partner Carlos Kauffmann incorporated brigades for the victims and put their helicopters into use transporting victims to Caracas and other cities, featured in a documentary for the Discovery Channel. During the oil strike they also helped the poorest Venezuelan people.

Through the company Ruibal & Durán, Durán and his partners are representatives and distributors of North American businesses in Venezuela, some of them specialized in selling equipment for the police department and the fire department.

=== Suitcase scandal ===
Durán was involved in the Suitcase scandal, an international drama over a suitcase carrying $800,000 in cash that was transferred from Petróleos de Venezuela (PDVSA) to Argentine then-presidential candidate Cristina Fernández de Kirchner in 2007. He was accused of working to cover-up the origins of the suitcase and subsequently tried in a U.S. federal court in Miami on charges of working illegally as a foreign agent of the Venezuelan government. In March 2009, Durán was sentenced to 48 months imprisonment, followed by 3 years of supervised release and a fine of $175,000.
