= Naujoji Banga =

Urugaian newspaper in Lithuanian language

Naujoji Banga ('New Wave') was a Lithuanian-language fortnightly newspaper published in Montevideo, Uruguay, from 1931 to 1940. Naujoji Banga was the organ of the Lithuanian Socialist Federation, the Lithuanian branch of the Socialist Party of Uruguay.
