= Lithuanian Uruguayans =

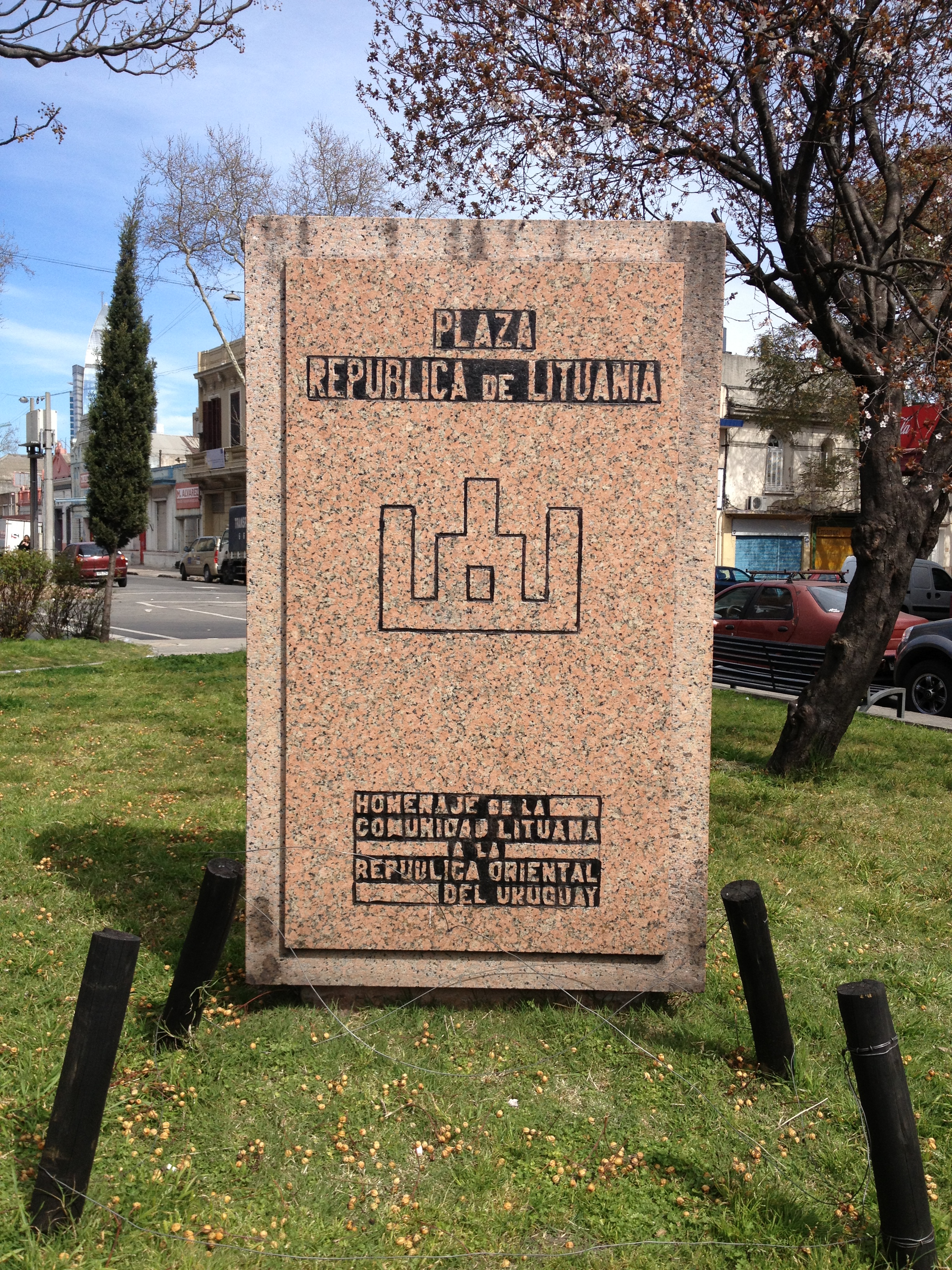
Memorial in the Republic of Lithuania Square, Montevideo, featuring the traditional Columns of Gediminas.

A Lithuanian Uruguayan is a Uruguayan citizen who is fully or partially of Lithuanian descent.

Lithuanians migrated to Uruguay mostly during the 1920s and 1930s; they eventually reached the 10,000-people-mark. They established their own institutions, such as the Uruguay-Lithuania Cultural Association and several Lithuanian-language newspapers, notably Naujoji Banga.

There is also a small Lithuanian Jewish community in Montevideo.

The 2011 Uruguayan census revealed 104 people who declared Lithuania as their country of birth.

== Notable people ==
- Zoma Baitler, artist
- Koba Brazionis, rugby union player
- Ladislao Brazionis, footballer
- Victorio Cieslinskas, Olympic basketball player (bronze in 1952)
- Vladas Doukšas, footballer
- Eduardo Gudynas, scientist
- José Gurvich, painter
- Freddy Nieuchowicz (born 1968), radio host and entertainer known by his stage name Orlando Petinatti
- Leonel Pilipauskas, footballer
- Lilián Abracinskas, female activist
- Nicolás Vikonis, footballer
- Sergio Gorzy, sports journalist and television presenter

== See also ==
- Lithuanian diaspora
- Immigration to Uruguay
