= Echoes of Lithuania =

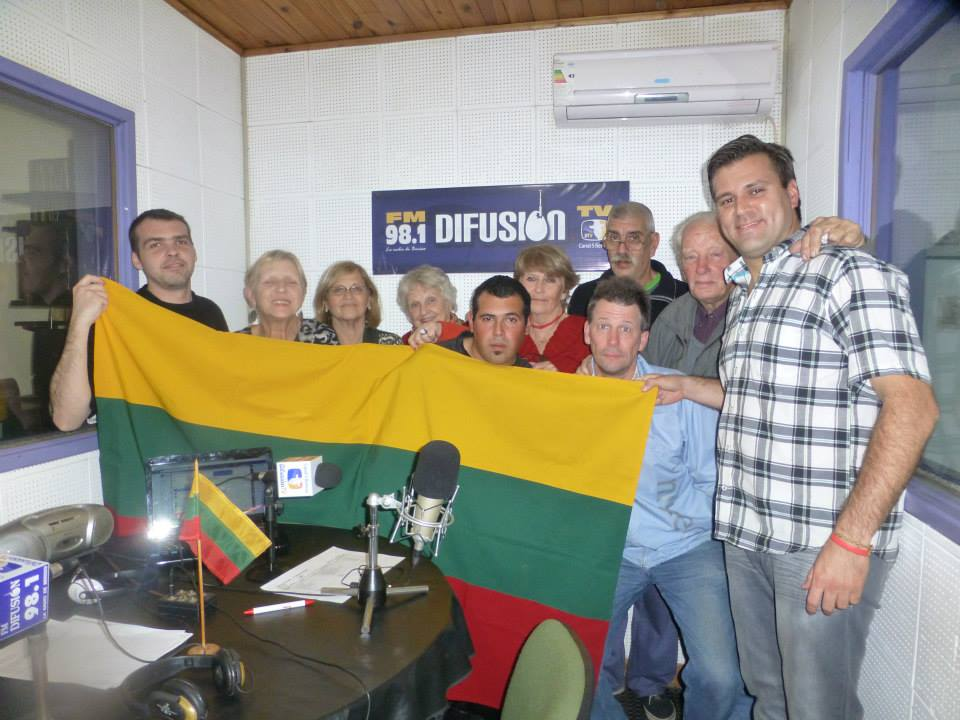
- Genre: Lithuanian diaspora
- Running time: 120 minutes weekly
- Country of origin: Argentina
- Language: Spanish
- Hosted by: Juan Ignacio Fourment Kalvelis
- Executive producer: Juan Ignacio Fourment Kalvelis
- Recording studio: Buenos Aires, Argentina
- Original release: 1947 – present
- Audio format: FM broadcasting
- Website: ecosdelituania.com.ar

Echoes of Lithuania (Ecos de Lituania) is Argentine only Lithuanian radio programme and it is produced in the municipality of Berisso in Buenos Aires, Argentina by Juan Ignacio Fourment Kalvelis.

== Background ==
The programme was founded in 1947 by Zeferinas Junkevicius, a Lithuanian-Argentine who wanted to keep united Argentina Lithuanian Diaspora by broadcasting covering a host of topics including Lithuanian sports, tourism, news, recipes, music, history and, traditions in Spanish language. The programme was operational in Argentina until 1971 that ended its broadcast. During all those years the programme was broadcast live from different Argentine radio stations such as “Radio Libertad”, “Radio Antártida” and “Radio Mitre”. Throughout the “Junkevicius Era” all the broadcastings ended with a “Sooner or later Lithuania will be free again". These words rang for 24 years in the heart of Lithuanian diaspora and rekindled the hopes that the Motherland regain its freedom.

== Revival ==
In 2003, with Lithuania now free and independent of the Soviet Union, Juan Ignacio Fourment Kalvelis, a young journalist and member of the Lithuanian community in Argentina, following the steps and values of Zeferinas Junkevicius, decided to re-open "Echoes of Lithuania". Today, Echoes of Lithuania broadcasts live from Buenos Aires every Sunday, from 19:00 to 21:00, through the radio station FM Difusión – Berisso on the channel 98.1 FM, broadcasting from the municipality of Berisso in Buenos Aires, Argentina. The programme can also be heard on-line, via the Internet.

== Awards ==
The broadcast won a number of awards including “Gaviota de Oro” and “Lanín de Oro". Meanwhile, the radio broadcast is recognized by the Ministry of Foreign Affairs of the Republic of Lithuania, the Embassy of the Republic of Lithuania in Argentina, the World Lithuanian Community and the World Lithuanian Youth among other institutions and organizations abroad.

== Staff ==
Juan Ignacio Fourment Kalvelis, Juan José Fourment, Isabel Kalvelis, Fabián Meschini, Alexis Griska, Alfonso Markus, Ana Semenas, Carlos Forte, Damián Romaniuk, Irene Andrunavicius, Juan Klimaitis, Mirta Cecis, Raúl Petronis, Virginia Petronis, Valentina Bukauskas, Miguel Stratakis, Adilson Puodziunas, Algirdas Delonas, Deimante Doksaite, Liudvikas Jakavicius-Grimalauskas, Fernando Jorge Ivanauskas, Jurgita Laurinenaite y Loreta Palauskaite.
