= Rudy Ulloa =

- Born: Rudy Fernando Ulloa Igor; April 1, 1960; Puerto Natales

Rudy Fernando Ulloa Igor (born 1 April 1960 in Puerto Natales Chile) is an Argentinian politician, businessman, and media entrepreneur who was born in Chile of Chilean parents.

== Early life and education ==
Ulloa was born 1 April 1960 in Puerto Natales, Chile, “a small village of fishermen with metal housing painted in primary colors.” When he was a boy, he moved with his mother, Omnia Igor; his brother, Paloma; and his stepfather, José Heriberto Sánchez, to El Carmen, a neighborhood of tin-roofed houses in Río Gallegos, Santa Cruz, Argentina. He attended the AGE School, funded by Sofía Vicic de Cepernic.

== Career ==
When he was a young man helped to establish “Los Muchachos Peronistas,” a youth group that spawned many notable Argentinians which still exists today. At one rally he turned out "more than 1,000 people" in the "Patagonian cold" . Kirchner became Mayor of Rio Gallegos in 1987 and Governor of Santa Cruz in 1991, and appointed Ulloa to the Technical Secretariat.

Ulloa began publishing a newspaper called El Periódico. During Kirchner’s third term as governor, Ulloa was in charge of TV channel, Channel 5 Community and Channel 2 Rio Gallegos. Ulloa later became president of a multimedia business that included a daily newspaper, an FM radio station, a production company, and a local TV channel.

== Controversies ==
In May 2013, journalist Jorge Lanata claimed that Ulloa owned a mansion in Rio Gallegos, “a fleet of nine high-end cars,” and other expensive property. In April 2014, Ulloa bought a $2 million farm that included a heated pool, soccer field, and a small theater. According to Clarin, at this point he already owned four houses in Rio Gallegos. In 2009, he had purchased a $700,000 mansion in Lomas de San Isidro, a $150,000 field in San Pedro, and an expensive property in the gated Pilar del Este district. The Clarin report stated that at least one source of his wealth was the income from the government’s advertising in his media properties, from which he had earned over $22 million during the “Kirchner decade.” Clarin reported that even after it folded, “El Periódico continued to receive government advertising.”

It was reported in 2013 that Ulloa had collected campaign funds for Nestor Kirchner from the firm San Isidro, owned by Raul "Cacho" Espinosa, who in return for his donations was promised fishing permits by Ulloa.
