= Vila Zelina =

Vila Zelina is a neighborhood located in São Paulo, Brazil. It is best known for the great number of Central and Eastern European immigrants from 15 countries that settled there in the early twentieth century, alongside being one of the largest colonies outside Lithuania. The neighborhood has also a number of Ukrainian, Bulgarian, Romanian, Hungarian, Lithuanian, Latvian, Estonian, Belarusian, Czech, Croatian, Slovenian, Slovakian, Polish, Russian, and Greek immigrants. In a monthly basis the local neighbors and commercials association named AMOVIZA organize an open air Eastern European immigrant handcraft and gastronomy fair at Aracati Mirim Street on Sundays. The Central and Eastern European immigrants helped develop Vila Zelina since its founding on 27 October 1927. Mr. Carlos Corkisko, a Lithuanian-Russian immigrant, was one of the key people that helped Vila Zelina during their colonization by Central and Eastern European immigrants. October is Vila Zelina's anniversary which is usually celebrated in an open air party with typical Eastern European food, folkloric dance and music shows alongside various handcrafts.
