= Secretariat of Public Works (Argentina) =

- Secretaría de Obras Públicas
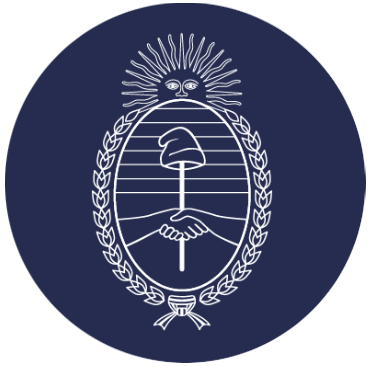

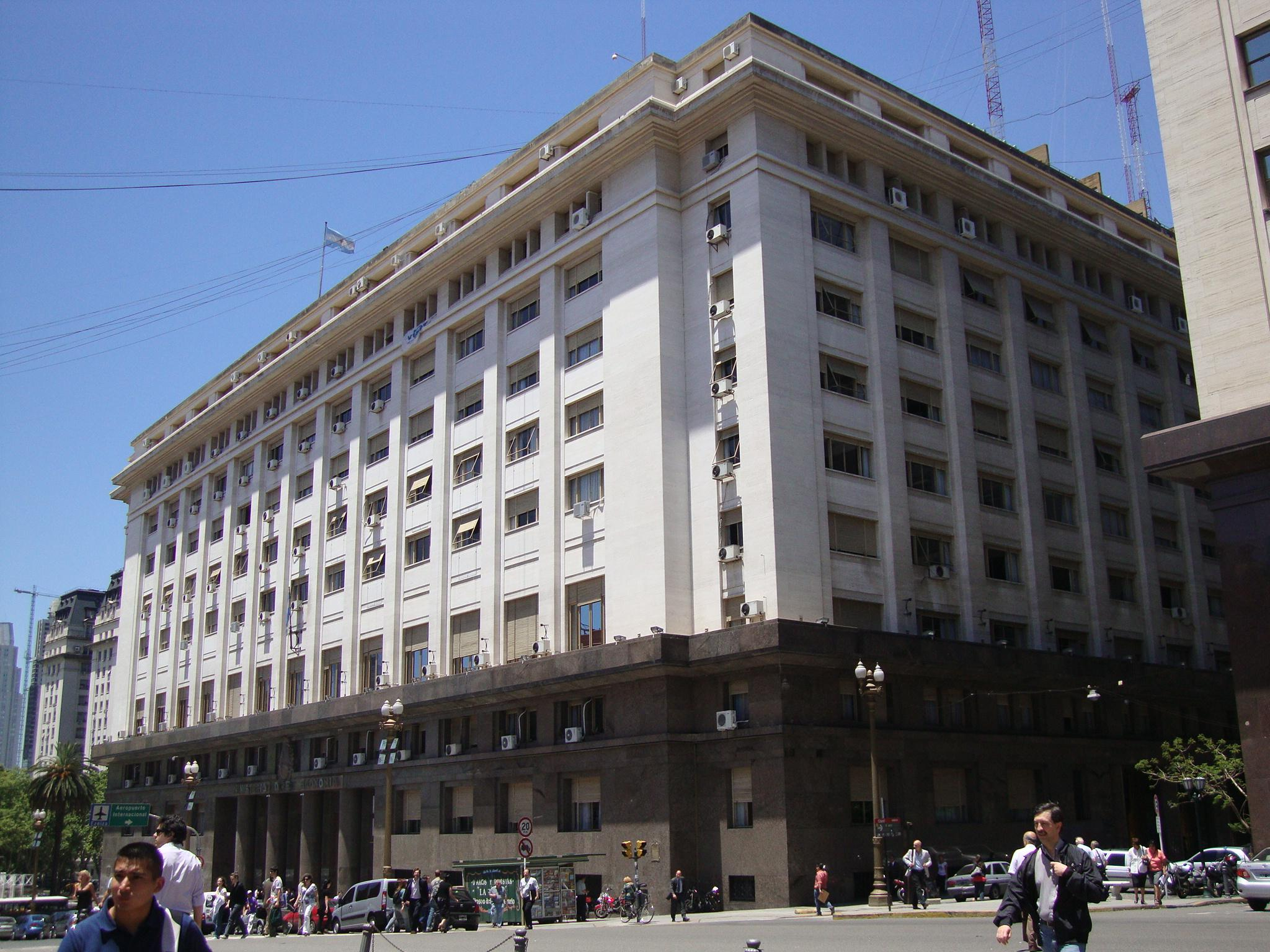
- Palacio de Hacienda, headquarters

Secretariat overview
- Formed: 1898; 128 years ago
- Superseding Secretariat: Ministry of Economy
- Jurisdiction: Government of Argentina
- Headquarters: Palacio de Hacienda, Buenos Aires
- Secretariat executive: Luis Giovine, Secretary
- Child agencies: Vialidad Nacional
- Website: argentina.gob.ar/obras-publicas

The Secretariat of Public Works (Spanish: Secretaría de Obras Públicas, formerly Ministry of Public Works) of Argentina is a secretariat and former ministry of the national executive power that oversaw and advised on the elaboration and maintenance of roadways, urban and hydraulic infrastructure and other types of public works.

From 2003 to 2015 it was known as the Ministry of Federal Planning, Public Investment and Services; it was reorganized as a secretariat of the Interior Ministry during the 2015–2019 presidency of Mauricio Macri, and reinstated as a ministry with its original name in 2019 under President Alberto Fernández.

The ministry was dissolved following a presidential decree from President Javier Milei, and turned into a secretariat, controlled by the Ministry of Economy.

== Attributions ==
As established by the ruling Ley de Ministerios ("Ministries Law"), adopted in December 2019, the Ministry of Public Works was reinstated (from having previously been part of the Interior Ministry's portfolio) due to the "importance of counting with a centralized organ to co-ordinate the national government's policy on public works and hydraulic infrastructure.

The Ministry's responsibilities and attributions are outlined in Article 21 of the current law, which states that, among others, it is within the ministry's competence overseeing the design and execution of plans and programs pertaining to public works and infrastructure on an international, national, regional, provincial and municipal level; co-ordinating these policies alongside the provincial governments and the government of the Autonomous City of Buenos Aires, intervening in the construction and fiscalization of transport (roads, airports and sea and river ports) and hydraulic infrastructure; and co-ordinating and executing the necessary public works to ensure civil protection of Argentina's inhabitants, as well as creating and upkeeping policies and regulations on public services within the competent areas, among others.

=== Structure and dependencies ===
As of 2019 the Ministry of Public Works is organized into the following centralized dependencies:

- Secretariat of Administrative Management (Secretaría de Gestión Administrativa)
- Secretariat of Public Works (Secretaría de Obras Públicas)
  - Undersecretariat of Planning and Territorial Co-ordination for Public Works (Subsecretaría de Planificación y Coordinación Territorial de la Obra Pública)
  - Undersecretariat of Public Works Execution (Subsecretaría de Ejecución de Obra Pública)
- Secretariat of Hydraulic Infrastructure and Policy (Secretaría de Infraestructura y Política Hídrica)
  - Undersecretariat of Hydraulic Works (Subsecretaría de Obras Hidráulicas)
  - Undersecretariat of Operational Management for Hydraulic Projects (Subsecretaría de Gestión Operativa de Proyectos Hídricos)

Additionally, a number of decentralized dependencies also report to the Ministry of Public Works, including the National Directorate of Roads (DNV), the National Hydraulic Works and Sanitation Authority (ENOHSA), the National Water Institute (INA), the National Institute of Seismic Prevention (INPRES), the National Regulatory Dam Safety Authority (ORSEP). Several state-owned enterprises are also overseen by the Ministry of Public Works, such as AySA and ACUMAR, the Matanza–Riachuelo River Basin Authority.

== Headquarters ==
The Secretariat is headquartered in the Palacio de Hacienda ("Palace of the Treasury"), located in the Monserrat barrio of Buenos Aires, which has historically housed the Ministry of Economy (formerly known as the Ministry of the Treasury) as well as other ministerial portfolios such as transport and production. The building was built in two stages from 1937 to 1950 and stands on Hipólito Yrigoyen street, across from the emblematic Plaza de Mayo square and the Casa Rosada, seat of the Presidency.

From 1936 to 1991 the Ministry of Public Works was housed in the iconic Ministry of Public Works Building (Edificio del Ministerio de Obras Públicas), located on 9 de Julio Avenue in downtown Buenos Aires, which is famous for its large steel image of Eva Perón. Nowadays the building houses the Health Ministry, but it is still sometimes known by its former name.

== List of ministers and secretaries ==
No.	Minister	Party	Term	President
Ministry of Public Works (1898–1958)
1	Emilio Civit	National Autonomist Party	12 October 1898 – 1904	Julio Argentino Roca
2	Wenceslao Escalante	National Autonomist Party	1904 – 12 October 1904	Julio Argentino Roca
3	Adolfo Orma	National Autonomist Party	12 October 1904 – 12 March 1906	Manuel Quintana
4	Miguel Tedín	Independent	14 March 1906 – 12 July 1907	José Figueroa Alcorta
5	Carlos Maschwitz	Independent	12 July 1907 – 4 November 1907	José Figueroa Alcorta
6	Ezequiel Ramos Mexía	National Autonomist Party	4 November 1907 – 16 July 1913	José Figueroa Alcorta
6	Ezequiel Ramos Mexía	National Autonomist Party	4 November 1907 – 16 July 1913	Roque Sáenz Peña
7	Carlos Meyer Pellegrini	Independent	21 July 1913 – 16 February 1914	Roque Sáenz Peña
8	Manuel Moyano	Independent	16 February 1914 – 12 October 1916	Roque Sáenz Peña
8	Manuel Moyano	Independent	16 February 1914 – 12 October 1916	Victorino de la Plaza
9	Pablo Torello	Radical Civic Union	12 October 1916 – 12 October 1922	Hipólito Yrigoyen
10	Eufrasio Loza	Radical Civic Union	12 October 1922 – 13 January 1925	Marcelo T. de Alvear
11	Roberto M. Ortiz	Radical Civic Union	13 January 1925 – 12 October 1928	Marcelo T. de Alvear
12	José Benjamín Ábalos	Radical Civic Union	12 October 1928 – 6 September 1930	Hipólito Yrigoyen
13	Octavio Sergio Pico	Radical Civic Union	6 de septiembre de 1930 – 16 de abril de 1931	José Félix Uriburu
14	Pablo Calatayud	Radical Civic Union	17 April 1931 – 20 February 1932	José Félix Uriburu
15	Manuel Ramón Alvarado	National Democratic Party	20 February 1932 – 1936	Agustín Pedro Justo
16	Eleazar Videla	Independent (Military)	1936 – 20 February 1938	Agustín Pedro Justo
17	Manuel Ramón Alvarado	National Democratic Party	20 February 1938 – 8 March 1940	Roberto M. Ortiz
18	Luis Alberto Barberis	National Democratic Party	8 March 1940 – 2 September 1940	Roberto M. Ortiz
19	Salvador Oría	Radical Civic Union	2 September 1940 – 4 June 1943	Roberto M. Ortiz
19	Salvador Oría	Radical Civic Union	2 September 1940 – 4 June 1943	Ramón Castillo
20	Ismael Galíndez	Independent (Military)	7 June 1943 – 14 October 1943	Pedro Pablo Ramírez
21	Ricardo A. Vago	Independent (Military)	14 October 1943 – 24 February 1944	Pedro Pablo Ramírez
22	Juan Pistarini	Independent (Military)	24 February 1944 – 4 June 1952	Pedro Pablo Ramírez
22	Juan Pistarini	Independent (Military)	24 February 1944 – 4 June 1952	Edelmiro Julián Farrell
22	Juan Pistarini	Peronist Party	24 February 1944 – 4 June 1952	Juan Domingo Perón
23	Roberto M. Dupeyron	Peronist Party	4 June 1952 – 21 September 1955	Juan Domingo Perón
24	José Blas Paladino	Independent	23 September 1955 – 13 November 1955	Eduardo Lonardi
25	Pedro Mendiondo	Independent	13 November 1955 – 1 May 1958	Pedro Aramburu
Ministry of Public Works and Services (1958–1973)
26	Justo Policarpo Villar	Radical Civic Union	18 June 1958 – 25 June 1959	Arturo Frondizi
27	Alberto Costantini	Independent	25 June 1959 – 28 April 1961	Arturo Frondizi
28	Arturo Acevedo	Independent	28 April 1961 – 15 January 1962	Arturo Frondizi
29	José Mazar Barnett	Radical Civic Union	15 January 1962 – 25 March 1962	Arturo Frondizi
30	Arturo Acevedo	Independent	25 March 1962 – 30 April 1962	Arturo Frondizi
30	Arturo Acevedo	Independent	25 March 1962 – 30 April 1962	José María Guido
31	Julio César Crivelli	Independent	30 April 1962 – 12 December 1962	José María Guido
32	Horacio Jorge Zubiri	Radical Civic Union	12 December 1962 – 12 October 1963	José María Guido
33	Miguel Ferrando	Radical Civic Union	12 October 1963 – 28 June 1966	Arturo Illia
34	Luis María Gotelli	Independent	28 June 1966 – 8 June 1970	Juan Carlos Onganía
35	Aldo Ferrer	Radical Civic Union	8 June 1970 – 26 October 1970	Roberto Levingston
36	Oscar Colombo	Independent	26 October 1970 – 8 June 1971	Roberto Levingston
36	Oscar Colombo	Independent	26 October 1970 – 8 June 1971	Alejandro Lanusse
37	Pedro A. Gordillo	Independent	8 June 1971 – 25 May 1973	Alejandro Lanusse
Ministry of Planning (1976–1978)
38	Ramón Genaro Díaz Bessone	Independent (Military)	25 October 1976 – 30 December 1977	Jorge Rafael Videla
39	Carlos E. Laidlaw	Independent (Military)	30 December 1977 – 30 October 1978	Jorge Rafael Videla
Ministry of Public Works and Services (1981–1991)
40	Diego Urricarriet	Independent (Military)	29 March 1981 – 12 December 1981	Roberto Viola
41	Sergio Martini	Independent	22 December 1981 – 1 July 1982	Leopoldo Galtieri
42	Conrado Bauer	Independent	2 July 1982 – 10 December 1983	Reynaldo Bignone
43	Roque Carranza	Radical Civic Union	10 December 1983 – 27 May 1985	Raúl Alfonsín
44	Roberto Tomasini	Radical Civic Union	27 May 1985 – 3 July 1986	Raúl Alfonsín
45	Pedro Trucco	Radical Civic Union	3 July 1986 – 16 September 1987	Raúl Alfonsín
46	Rodolfo Terragno	Radical Civic Union	16 September 1987 – 26 May 1989	Raúl Alfonsín
47	Roberto Pedro Echarte	Radical Civic Union	26 May 1989 – 8 July 1989	Raúl Alfonsín
48	Roberto José Dromi	UCEDE	8 July 1989 – 4 January 1991	Carlos Menem
Ministry of Economy, Public Works and Services (1991–1999)
49	Domingo Cavallo	Justicialist Party	1 March 1991 – 6 August 1996	Carlos Menem
50	Roque Fernández	Justicialist Party	6 August 1996 – 10 December 1999	Carlos Menem
Ministry of Infrastructure and Housing (1999–2001)
51	Nicolás Gallo	Radical Civic Union	10 December 1999 – 5 October 2000	Fernando de la Rúa
52	José Luis Machinea	Radical Civic Union	5 October 2000 – 5 March 2001	Fernando de la Rúa
53	Ricardo López Murphy	Radical Civic Union	5 March 2001 – 20 March 2001	Fernando de la Rúa
54	Carlos Bastos	Independent	20 March 2001 – 21 December 2001	Fernando de la Rúa
Ministry of Federal Planning, Public Investment and Services (2003–2015)
55	Julio de Vido	Justicialist Party	25 May 2003 – 10 December 2015	Néstor Kirchner
55	Julio de Vido	Justicialist Party	25 May 2003 – 10 December 2015	Cristina Fernández de Kirchner
Ministry of the Interior, Public Works and Housing (2015–2019)
56	Rogelio Frigerio	Republican Proposal	10 December 2015 – 10 December 2019	Mauricio Macri
Ministry of Public Works (2019–2023)
57	Gabriel Katopodis	Justicialist Party	10 December 2019 – 10 December 2023	Alberto Fernández
Secretary of Public Works (2023–)
59	Luis Giovine	Independent	10 December 2023 – present	Javier Milei
