= Ricardo Ivoskus =

Argentinian lawyer (born 1942)

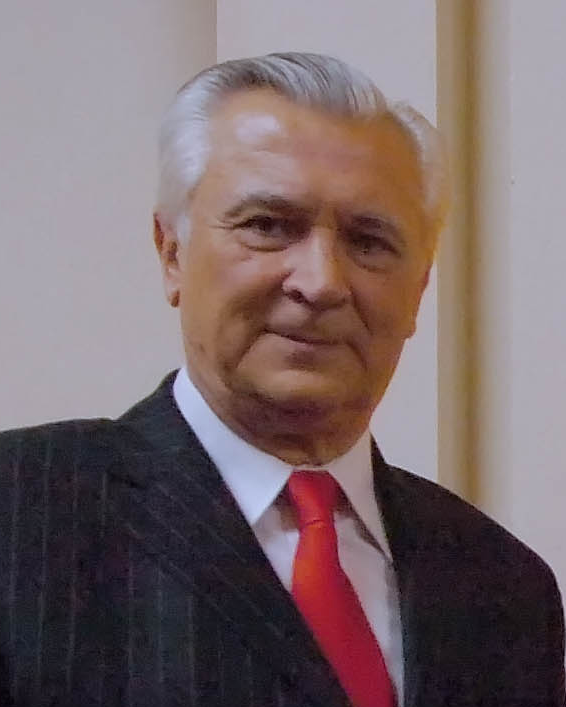
- Ricardo Ivoskus in 2008
- Born: 10 January 1942 (age 84); Villa Ballester, Argentina
- Occupations: Lawyer, politician
- Years active: 1999-2011

Ricardo Leonardo Ivoskus (born 10 January 1942) is an Argentine lawyer and politician. He has served as mayor of General San Martín Partido, located in the northern suburbs of Buenos Aires, from 1999 till 2011.
