= Nicolás Gallo (politician) =

Nicolás Vicente Gallo
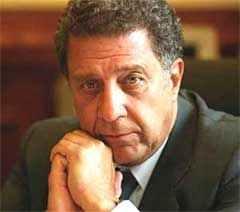

Minister of Infrastructure and Housing of Argentina
- In office 10 December 1999 – 5 October 2000
- President: Fernando de la Rúa

President of ENTel
- In office 1987–1989

President of Subterráneos de Buenos Aires (SBASE)
- In office 1983–1987

Personal details
- Born: February 2, 1938 (age 88) Buenos Aires, Argentina
- Party: Radical Civic Union (UCR)
- Occupation: Civil engineer, politician
- Known for: Creation of the Buenos Aires Premetro

Nicolás Vicente Gallo (born 2 February 1938) is an Argentinian politician and civil engineer who served as Minister of Infrastructure and Housing during the presidency of Fernando de la Rúa between 1999 and 2001.

He also served as president of Subterráneos de Buenos Aires SE (SBASE), the state-owned company who managed the Buenos Aires Metro in 1983. During his term as its president the Premetro was created. After his term as the president of the SBASE, he was designated the president of ENTel in 1987.
