= Julio de Vido =

Argentine politician (born 1949)

Julio de Vido OSC
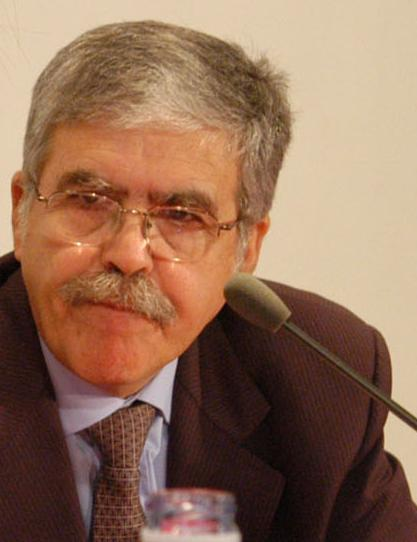

Minister of Federal Planning, Public Investment and Services
- In office 25 May 2003 – 10 December 2015
- President: Néstor Kirchner; Cristina Fernández de Kirchner
- Preceded by: Roberto Dromi (1989–91)
- Succeeded by: Francisco Adolfo Cabrera

Personal details
- Born: 26 December 1949 (age 76) Buenos Aires, Argentina
- Party: Justicialist Party
- Spouse: Alessandra Minnicelli
- Education: University of Buenos Aires

Julio Miguel de Vido (born December 26, 1949) is an Argentine politician who was Ministry of Federal Planning, Public Investment and Services between 2003 and 2015.

== Biography ==
De Vido was born in the City of Buenos Aires in 1949. Enrolling at the University of Buenos Aires School of Architecture and Urbanism, he graduated in 1974. He returned to the remote Province of Santa Cruz, and was named Works Director within the province's Housing and Urban Development Institute in 1988 by Justicialist Governor Héctor Marcelino García. He was promoted to the post of Provincial Highway Bureau Director in 1990.

The 1991 election of Río Gallegos Mayor Néstor Kirchner as Governor led to de Vido's appointment as Santa Cruz's Economy Minister, in which capacity he oversaw the investment of a US$535 million payout Kirchner negotiated for his oil-rich province when YPF, the state-owned oil concert, was privatized in 1993. Julio de Vido was elected to the Chamber of Deputies in the 1997 midterm elections. He returned to Santa Cruz Province halfway through his term, however, and was named Minister of Government by Kirchner, securing de Vido's role as Kirchner's chief adviser.

After working for Kirchner's presidential campaign in the 2003 general election, de Vido was named Minister of Federal Planning, Public Investment and Services when Kirchner became President on 25 May 2003; the post was reinstated to cabinet-level status following a 12-year hiatus. Overseeing the nation's public works, de Vido presided over a dramatic increase in public investment, though he has reaped criticism for his apparent reliance on patronage and for doting a disproportionate share of these record investments into Santa Cruz Province, which is home to 0.6% of the Argentine population. His wife, Alessandra Minnicelli, served as Director of SIGEN, the chief auditing office of the Argentine government, from 2003 to 2007, and the couple has been the focus of a number of investigations regarding their increasing net worth.

Minister de Vido was instrumental in shaping President Cristina Kirchner's record US$32 billion public works plan for 2009–2010. He later confirmed that the plan's headline project, the construction of the Buenos Aires-Rosario-Córdoba high-speed railway (the first of its kind in the Western Hemisphere), would be postponed in favor of developing greater nuclear power capacity to satisfy the growing electricity demand. He, along with Labor Minister Carlos Tomada, became the longest-serving cabinet member in the Kirchnerist era that began in 2003.

On 16 April 2012, de Vido was appointed to head the federal intervention of the YPF, the leading fossil fuel producer and distributor in Argentina. The company, which had been privatized in 1993 and acquired by Repsol of Spain in 1999, was partly renationalized amid ongoing production declines.

In the 2015 general elections de Vido was elected a deputy for the Front for Victory. On October 25, 2017, the National Congress voted to revoke his parliamentary immunity, after a federal judge sought to question him over alleged irregularities in the handling of public funds relating to the state-owned coal mining company Yacimientos Carboníferos Río Turbio. In November the same year, de Vido was detained, had parts of his assets frozen, and was prohibited from leaving the country. After more than two years of detention without the case having been brought to trial, a federal court ordered de Vido's release from custody in March 2020.

In October 2018, de Vido was sentenced to five years and eight months' imprisonment, as well as barred from public office for life, for responsibility in the 2012 Buenos Aires rail disaster, in which 51 people were killed. The sentence was upheld by Argentina's Court of Cassation in December 2020.

In March 2025, de Vido and Cristina Kirchner were accused of "involvement in significant corruption" and sanctioned by the United States Department of State. On 30 September 2025, de Vido received a four-year prison sentence for irregularities in the acquisition of 11 liquefied natural gas tankers between 2008 and 2009.

== Honours and awards ==
=== Foreign honours ===
- Spain: Knight Grand Cross of the Order of Isabella the Catholic (6 February 2009)
- Brazil: Grand Cross of the Order of the Southern Cross (15 May 2014)
