= Marcela Losardo =

Argentine lawyer and politician

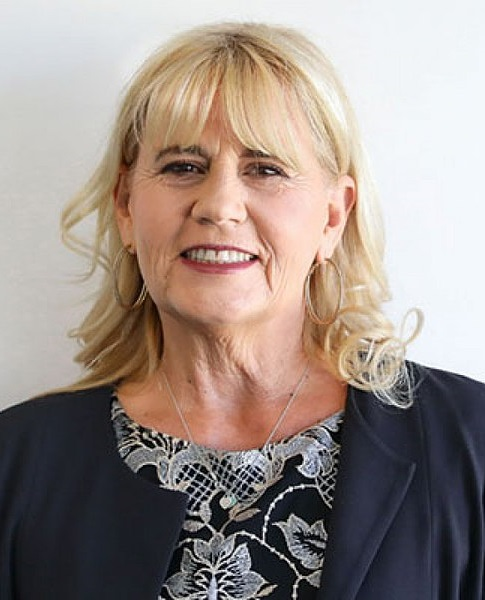

Argentine Ambassador to UNESCO
- In office 16 July 2021 – 10 December 2023
- Preceded by: Fernando Solanas

Minister of Justice and Human Rights
- In office 10 December 2019 – 29 March 2021
- President: Alberto Fernández
- Preceded by: Germán Garavano
- Succeeded by: Martín Soria

Secretary of Justice
- In office 18 May 2005 – 5 August 2009
- President: Néstor Kirchner; Cristina Fernández de Kirchner
- Preceded by: María José Rodríguez
- Succeeded by: Héctor Masquelet

Councillor of Magistracy
- In office 19 November 2006 – 5 August 2009
- Appointed by: National Executive Power

Personal details
- Born: 24 August 1958 (age 68) Buenos Aires, Argentina
- Party: Independent; Frente de Todos (since 2019)
- Education: University of Buenos Aires

Marcela Míriam Losardo (Spanish pronunciation: [maɾˈsela ˈmiɾjam loˈsaɾðo]; born 24 August 1958) is an Argentine lawyer and politician. She served as the country's Minister of Justice and Human Rights from 10 December 2019 to 29 March 2021, in the cabinet of President Alberto Fernández. In 2021, she was appointed Argentina's representative to UNESCO.

== Early life and education ==
Losardo was born in Buenos Aires in 1958. She played tennis in high school and attended the Lenguas Vivas school system. She studied law at the University of Buenos Aires School of Law, where she met future Argentine president Alberto Fernández, with whom she would later set up a bureau.

== Political career ==
Losardo worked alongside Alberto Fernández in the insurance superintendency from 1989 to 1996; from then on she worked in his staff during his term in the Buenos Aires City Legislature from 2003 to 2005.

In 2005 she was appointed Secretary of Justice, working under the successive administrations of justice ministers Horacio Rosatti, Alberto Iribarne, Aníbal Fernández and Julio Alak. In 2006 she served as the Executive Power's representative to the Council of Magistracy. She left the secretariat in 2009 at the behest of Alak; her successor was Héctor Masquelet.

=== Minister of Justice and Human Rights ===
On 6 December 2019 it was announced Losardo was going to be the new Minister of Justice and Human Rights in the incoming cabinet of President Alberto Fernández, succeeding Germán Garavano. She assumed office alongside the rest of the new cabinet on 10 December 2019.

As justice minister, Losardo has spearheaded the Fernández government's proposed reform of the justice system. The reform project is currently being debated in the Argentine Senate.

In March 2021, Losardo announced she was stepping down as Minister. She was succeeded by Martín Soria on 29 March 2021.

== Personal life ==
Losardo is married to Fernando Mitjans, a scrivener whom she met while studying in university. Losardo and Mitjans have a daughter, Clara, who is also a lawyer.

Political offices
Preceded by María José Rodríguez	Secretary of Justice; 2005–2009	Succeeded by Héctor Masquelet
Preceded by Germán Garavano	Minister of Justice and Human Rights; 2019–2021	Succeeded by Martín Soria
Preceded by Fernando Solanas	Argentine Ambassador to UNESCO; 2021–2023	Succeeded by Incumbent
