= Rodolfo Tailhade =

Argentine politician

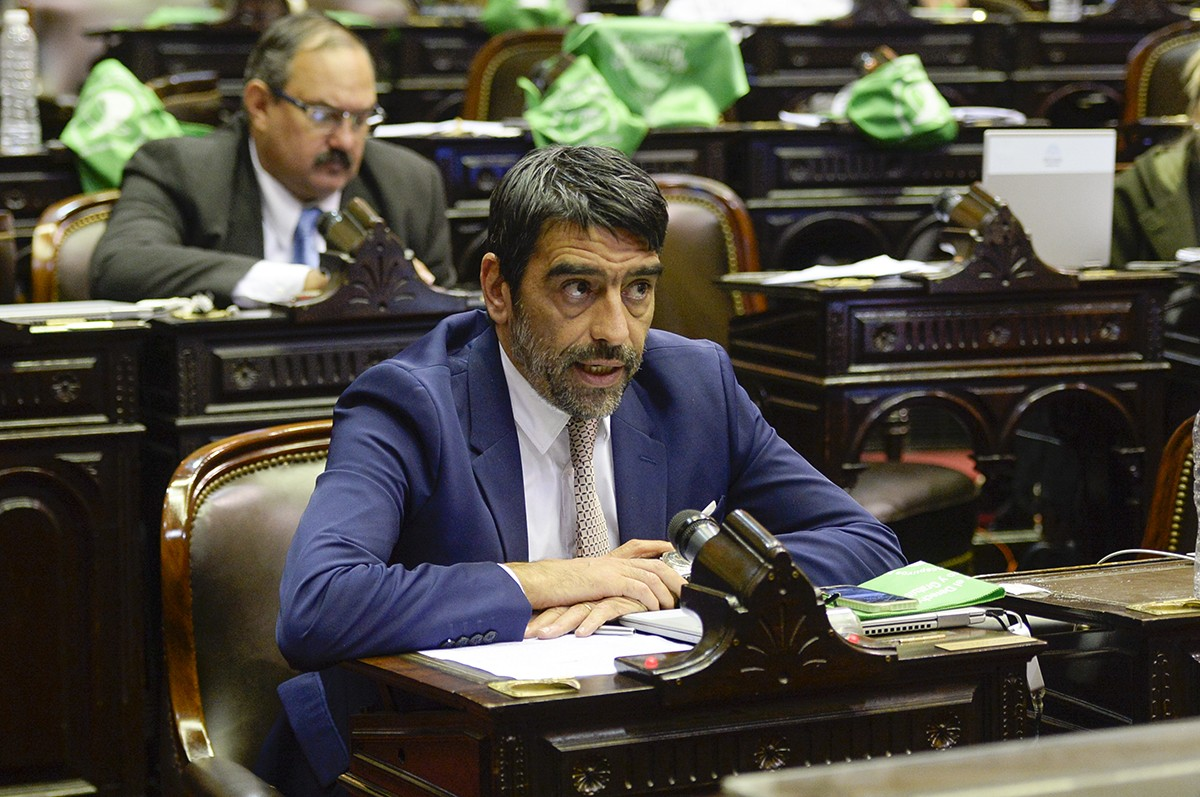

National Deputy
- Incumbent
- Assumed office 10 December 2015
- Constituency: Buenos Aires

Councillor of Magistracy
- In office 12 July 2016 – 12 November 2018
- Appointed by: Chamber of Deputies

General Inspector of Justice
- In office 10 December 2013 – 10 December 2014
- President: Cristina Fernández de Kirchner
- Preceded by: Norberto Carlos Berner
- Succeeded by: Martín Cormic

Personal details
- Born: 18 August 1970 (age 56) Choele Choel, Argentina
- Party: Justicialist Party
- Other political affiliations: Front for Victory (2003–2017); Unidad Ciudadana (2017–2019); Frente de Todos (2019–present)
- Education: Universidad del Museo Social Argentino

Luis Rodolfo Tailhade (born 18 August 1970) is an Argentine lawyer specialized in criminal law and politician, currently serving as National Deputy representing Buenos Aires Province. A member of the Justicialist Party and La Cámpora, Tailhade was first elected in 2015 and was re-elected in 2019. He previously served as General Inspector of Justice from 2013 to 2014, during the presidency of Cristina Fernández de Kirchner, and as the Chamber of Deputies' representative in the Council of Magistracy from 2016 to 2018.

== Early life and education ==
Tailhade was born on 18 August 1970 in Choele Choel, Río Negro Province. He finished high school at the Escuela Comercial N° 13, where he was politically active and served as president of the students' union. He studied law at the Universidad del Museo Social Argentino (UMSA), graduating in 1994 with a specialization in criminal law. He was a member of the Discipline Tribunal of the Colegio Público de Abogados de la Capital Federal (CPAF), the bar association of Buenos Aires.

== Political career ==
In 2008, Tailhade co-founded Abogados por la Justicia Social (AJUS, "Lawyers for Social Justice"), a civil association affiliated with La Cámpora, the youth organization allied to the Front for Victory. From 2011 to 2013, he was an advisor at the Ministry of Justice and Human Rights of Argentina under minister Julio Alak. In 2013, he was elected to the City Council of Malvinas Argentinas. That year, he was also appointed General Inspector of Justice, in replacement of Norberto Carlos Berner.

At the 2015 legislative election, Tailhade was the 10th candidate in the Front for Victory list in Buenos Aires Province. The list received 37.28% of the vote, and Tailhade was elected. He was re-elected in 2019, as the 17th candidate in the Frente de Todos list.

In 2016, Tailhade was elected as one of the Chamber of Deputies' representatives to the Council of Magistracy, in replacement of Héctor Recalde. He served in the position until 12 November 2018, and was replaced by Eduardo de Pedro.

During his 2019–2023 term, Tailhade presided the parliamentary commission on Justice, and formed part of the commissions on Internal Security, Petitions, Powers and Norms, Criminal Legislation, Political Trials, Finances, and Constitutional Affairs. He was a supporter of the legalization of abortion in Argentina, voting in favour of the two Voluntary Interruption of Pregnancy bills that were debated by the Argentine Congress in 2018 and 2020.

== Electoral history ==
Electoral history of Rodolfo Tailhade
Election	Office	List	#	District	Votes			Result	Ref.
Election	Office	List	#	District	Total	%	P.	Result	Ref.
2015	National Deputy	Front for Victory	10	Buenos Aires Province	3,354,619	37.28%	1st (Note: Presented on an electoral list. The data shown represents the share of the vote the entire party/alliance received in that constituency.)	Elected	
2019	National Deputy	Frente de Todos	17	Buenos Aires Province	5,113,359	52.64%	1st	Elected	
2023	National Deputy	Union for the Homeland	7	Buenos Aires Province	4,094,665	43.71%	1st	Elected	
