= Bruera (surname) =

Bruera is a surname. Notable people with the surname include:

- Facundo Bruera (born 1998), Argentine professional footballer
- Lucas Bruera (born 1997), Argentine professional footballer
- Pablo Bruera (born 1964), Argentine politician

== See also ==
- Bruera, village in Cheshire, England
