= Tailhade =

Tailhade is a surname. Notable people with the surname include:

- Laurent Tailhade (1854–1919), French poet
- Rodolfo Tailhade (born 1970), Argentine lawyer and politician
