= Germán Garavano =

Argentinian lawyer (born 1969)

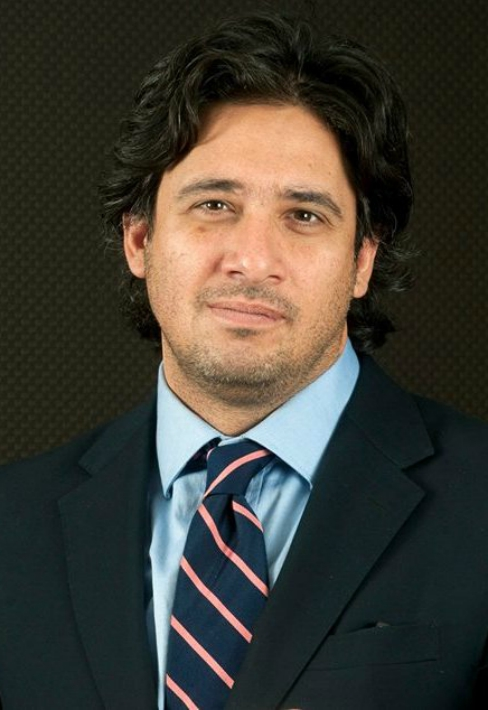

Minister of Justice and Human Rights
- In office 10 December 2015 – 10 December 2019
- President: Mauricio Macri
- Preceded by: Julio Alak
- Succeeded by: Marcela Losardo

Substitute Councillor of Magistracy
- In office 9 September 2014 – 10 September 2015
- Appointed by: Federal lawyers

Attorney General of the City of Buenos Aires
- In office 10 September 2007 – 9 September 2014
- Succeeded by: Martín Ocampo

Personal details
- Born: 23 October 1969 (age 56) Buenos Aires, Argentina
- Party: Independent
- Other political affiliations: Cambiemos (2015–present)
- Spouse: Carolina Gardiner
- Children: 3
- Education: Pontifical Catholic University of Argentina
- Website: germangaravano.com

Germán Carlos Garavano (born October 23, 1969) is an Argentine lawyer and expert on judicial reform, and the former minister of Justice and Human Rights of Argentina between 2015 and 2019. He was Attorney General of the city of Buenos Aires between 2007 and 2014 and substitute Councillor of the Council of Magistracy of Argentina.

== Career ==
Germán Garavano was born in 1969 in Buenos Aires. At the age of 18, he enrolled at the Pontifical Catholic University of Argentina to study law, graduating in 1994.

Simultaneously, he began his career at the federal criminal courts of Argentina, reaching the status of clerk of the court after years of several promotions.

He completed postgraduate studies at the Laws and Economics Institute of the Complutense University of Madrid, Spain, as well as at the United Kingdom, where he was invited by the Foreign and Commonwealth Office and the British Council.

Before Garavano was appointed Attorney General of the city of Buenos Aires in 2007, he performed as Counselor of the Council of Magistracy of the city of Buenos Aires and judge at the Criminal Court No. 12 of the city. He was also elected vice-president of the Board of Trustees of Justice Studies Center of the Americas (CEJA-JSCA), chosen for this position by the General Assembly of the Organization of American States (OAS), proposed by the Argentine government.

In 2008, Garavano encouraged the creation of the Criminal Investigation Squad at the General Secretariat of Criminal Policies and Strategic Planning of the Buenos Aires Attorney General's Office.

In 2014 he was elected substitute Counsillor of Argentina's Council of Magistracy on representation of the lawyers of Buenos Aires, sharing the 4-year term with Adriana Donato.

He has written fifteen books and numerous articles on Law and judicial reform, some of which have received awards. Starting in April 2014, he also performed as the academic director of the non-governmental organization Unidos Por la Justicia. Regarding his personal life, Garavano is married and has three sons.

As Minister of Justice and Human Rights of Argentina, he promoted a judicial reform program named 'Justicia 2020' ('Justice 2020'). The program sought to bring the Argentinian judicial system in line with the New World Agenda of Sustainable Development of the United Nations. Reforms including modernisation of procedures and creation of specialised investigative courts to facilitate investigation. The program was praised by the OECD and the Open Government Partnership in 2019.

During his term as Minister, the United States declassified secret files about the so-called National Reorganization Process and gave them to Argentina's government. Garavano received around 50,000 digitalized pages of documents.

In February 2018, Garavano hosted the first meeting of the International Working Group on Justice in Buenos Aires, an initiative of the Pathfinders for Peaceful, Just and Inclusive Societies. The meeting brought together the group's co-chairs: Sierra Leone's Minister of Justice Joseph Kamara, the Netherlands' Minister for Foreign Trade and Development Cooperation Sigrid Kaag, and Hina Jilani of The Elders. The meeting included participation from Mary Robinson, former President of Ireland and United Nations High Commissioner for Human Rights, and Hina Jilani, who led a walk for justice as part of the centenary celebrations for Nelson Mandela. The event also featured the presentation of the Grassroots Justice Prize, which recognized the work of community activists worldwide. The Working Group focused on addressing the situation of more than 4 billion people living without effective access to justice, working in four areas: measuring the global justice gap, developing arguments for investment in justice, identifying effective strategies to close the gap, and drafting a call to action for the implementation of Sustainable Development Goal 16.3 on access to justice from the 2030 Agenda.

In 2018, when Italy's president Sergio Mattarella visited Argentina, he awarded Garavano the Order of the Star of Italy.

== Publications ==
=== Academic director ===
- Garavano, Germán C.; Héctor Olasolo; David Fernando Varela; Daniel Alejandro Garavito Góez; Juan José Romero Morales; Laura Vacca Moyano; Mariana Molina Flórez; Andrés Felipe Cañizo Ramírez (2025). Las respuestas a la corrupción desde los ámbitos financiero y tributario y la cooperación internacional en materia fiscal, contra el lavado de activos y para su recuperación. Parte I: El fenómeno de la corrupción en América Latina y las respuestas internacionales (in Spanish). Valencia: Tirant lo Blanch. ISBN 9791370100056.
- Garavano, Germán C.; Héctor Olasolo; David Fernando Varela; Daniel Alejandro Garavito Góez; Gabriela Velásquez Medina; María Camila de la Peña Calderón; Daniela Clavijo Fonseca; José Ángel Sánchez Quintero (2025). Las respuestas a la corrupción desde los ámbitos financiero y tributario y la cooperación internacional en materia fiscal, contra el lavado de activos y para su recuperación. Parte II: Los casos de Argentina, Brasil, Chile, Colombia y Perú (in Spanish). Valencia: Tirant lo Blanch. ISBN 9791370100063.
- Garavano, Germán C. (2014). Información & justicia IV (PDF) (in Spanish). Buenos Aires: Konrad Adenauer Stiftung; Unidos por la Justicia Asociación Civil. ISBN 978-987-1285-36-5.
- Garavano, Germán C. (2011). Información & justicia III (PDF) (in Spanish). Buenos Aires: Konrad Adenauer Stiftung; Unidos por la Justicia Asociación Civil. ISBN 978-987-1285-25-9.

=== Co-author ===
- Garavano, Germán C.; Jorge Díaz; Georgia Diogo; José Luis Lopes da Mota; Paulina Téllez (2022). Desafíos de la Justicia frente al Crimen Organizado en el Marco del Ciclo Político de Justicia (PDF) (in Spanish). Madrid, Spain: Programa EL PAcCTO.
- Garavano, Germán C.; Marco Fandiño; Leonel González (2014). Evaluación del impacto del nuevo Modelo de Gestión Fiscal del Ministerio Público de Guatemala (in Spanish). Santiago, Chile: Centro de Estudios de Justicia de las Américas (CEJA). p. 136. ISBN 978-956-849129-1.
- Garavano, Germán (2006). Información y Justicia II. Datos sobre la Justicia Argentina (PDF) (in Spanish). Buenos Aires: Unidos por la Justicia, Fundación Konrad Adenauer. ISBN 978-987-21857-4-9.
- Garavano, Germán (2005). Fundación Konrad Adenauer (ed.). Programa Conjunto: Justicia, Seguridad, Comunidad y Desarrollo Económico (in Spanish). Buenos Aires: Unidos por la Justicia.
- Garavano, Germán (2005). Eugenio Burzaco, Diego Gorgal (ed.). Mano Justa: Una reflexión sobre la inseguridad pública y una propuesta para superar la crisis (in Spanish). Buenos Aires: El Ateneo.
- Garavano, Germán (2004). Milena Ricci, Gustavo González Ferrari y otros (ed.). Información y Justicia. Datos sobre la Justicia Argentina (PDF) (in Spanish). Buenos Aires: Unidos por la Justicia.
- Ministerio de Justicia, Seguridad y Derechos Humanos (2003). Luis M. Palma (relator compilador) (ed.). Todos por la Justicia: Síntesis de Actividades febrero de 2002 – mayo de 2003 (in Spanish). Buenos Aires: Mesa Permanente de Justicia del Diálogo Argentino.
- Garavano, Germán (2002). Poder Judicial, Competitividad y Desarrollo Económico en la Argentina. Tomo III (in Spanish). Buenos Aires: Rubinzal-Culzoni.
- Garavano, Germán (2003). Eugenio Curia (coautor) (ed.). Ideas para una Nueva Argentina: "Aportes al Debate Nacional". Capítulo: Una transformación de la Justicia Argentina (in Spanish).
- Garavano, Germán (2000). Eugenio De Palma (coautor) (ed.). Poder Judicial, Competitividad y Desarrollo Económico en la Argentina. Tomo I (in Spanish). Buenos Aires: Depalma.
- Garavano, Germán (2000). Justicia para Todos: Políticas de Consenso para la Recuperación de la Justicia Argentina (in Spanish). Buenos Aires: Ariel.

=== Book chapter ===
- Garavano, Germán C. (2018). Chayer, Héctor M.; Marcet, Juan Pablo; Garsco, Marisa Alejandra (eds.). Prólogo en Justicia 2020: cercana, moderna, transparente e independiente (in Spanish). Buenos Aires: Eudeba. pp. 7–8. ISBN 978-950-23-2876-8.
- Garavano, Germán (2006). "Responsabilidad judicial de cara al servicio de justicia y su reforma". In Alfonso Santiago (director) (ed.). La Responsabilidad Judicial y sus Dimensiones (in Spanish). Buenos Aires: Ábaco.
- Garavano, Germán (2006). "Análisis Económico de la Justicia Criminal". In Viviana Kluger (compiladora) (ed.). Análisis Económico del Derecho (in Spanish). Buenos Aires: Heliasta. ISBN 950-885-085-X.

Political offices
Preceded by Julio Alak	Minister of Justice and Human Rights; 2015–2019	Succeeded by Marcela Losardo
