= Mariano Cúneo Libarona =

Argentine lawyer

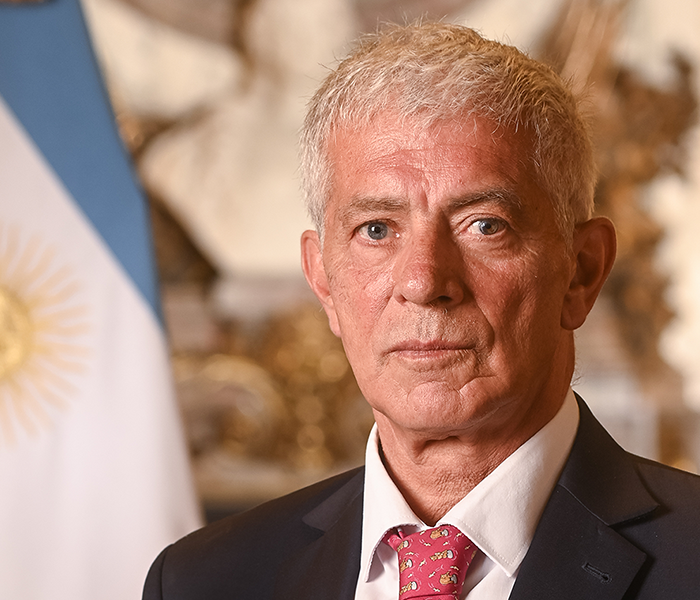
- Official portrait, 2024

Minister of Justice
- In office 10 December 2023 – 4 March 2026
- President: Javier Milei
- Preceded by: Martín Soria
- Succeeded by: Juan Bautista Mahiques

Personal details
- Born: 8 June 1961 (age 65)
- Party: La Libertad Avanza
- Education: Universidad del Museo Social Argentino; University of Salamanca

Mariano Cúneo Libarona (Spanish pronunciation: [maˈɾjano ˈkuneo liβaˈɾona]; born 1961) is an Argentine lawyer who is serving as the country's Minister of Justice since 2023 under president Javier Milei.

== Biography ==
Mariano Cúneo Libarona is a lawyer, and worked for the Eurnekian family for 30 years. He defended Hugo Eurnekian in the notebook case. He defended Guillermo Coppola, who was acquitted, and then, in turn, accused the judge Hernán Bernasconi, who ended up in prison.

Judge Norberto Oyarbide jailed him for extortion, during the AMIA bombing case. He was acquitted several years later.

Javier Milei was elected president of Argentina in 2023, and appointed Libarona as the new minister of justice.

Libarona announced his departure from his position as Minister of Justice on October 23, 2025, citing alleged health concerns, "[...] but more than health concerns, it is the necessity to recover my affections", although the political context of his departure is marred by accusations of corruption. He left the post on March 4, 2026, being replaced by Juan Bautista Mahiques.

Political offices
Preceded by Martín Soria	Minister of Justice; 2023–2026	Succeeded by Juan Bautista Mahiques
