= Jone Laspiur =

Spanish actress and artist (born 1995)

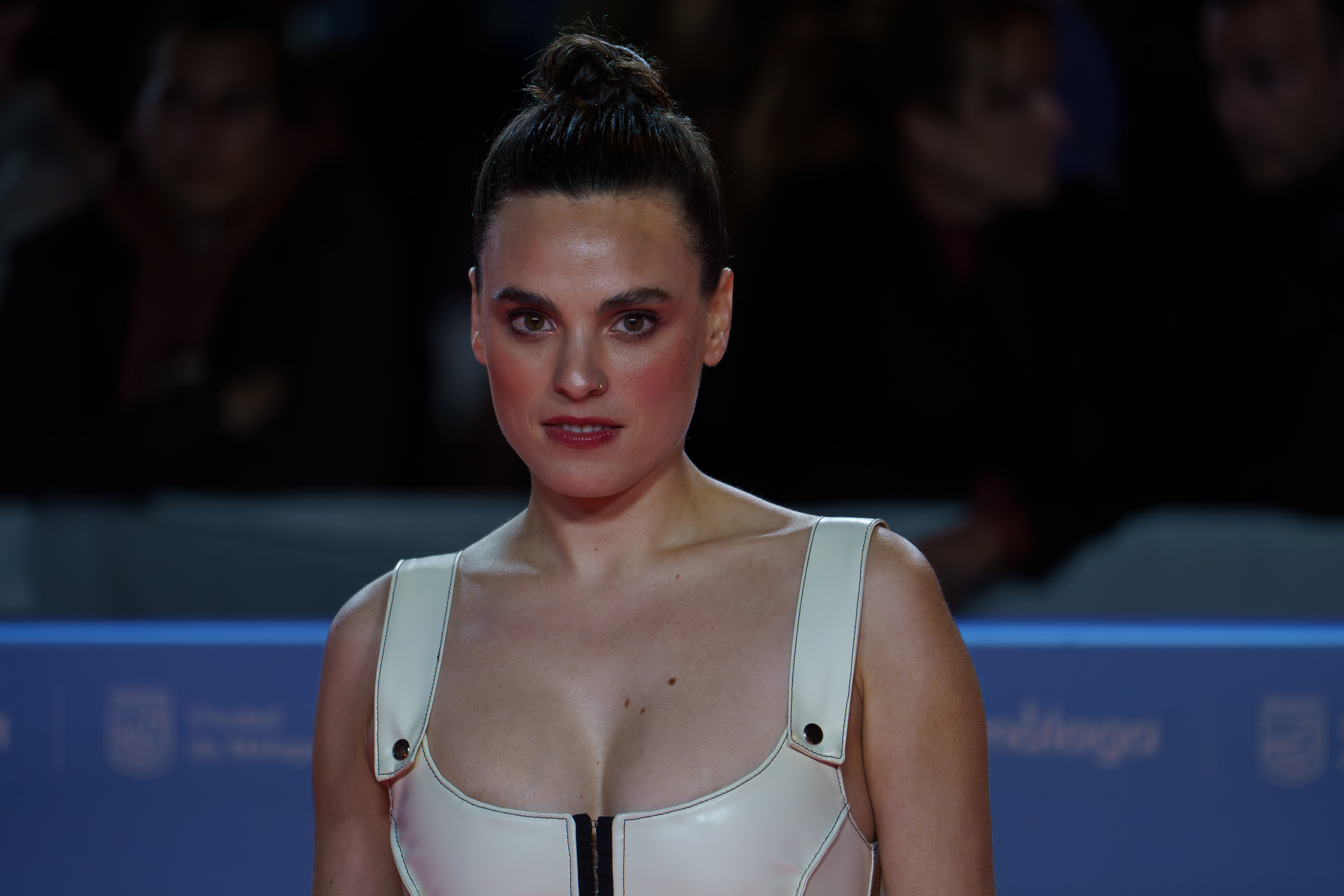
- Laspiur in 2025
- Born: Jone Laspiur Gorosabel; 1995 (age 29–30); San Sebastián, Gipuzkoa, Spain
- Education: University of the Basque Country (BFA, 2017); Complutense University of Madrid (MA); Universidad del Museo Social Argentino (exchange)
- Occupations: Actress; Artist
- Years active: 2020–present

Jone Laspiur Gorosabel (born 1995) is a Spanish actress and artist from San Sebastián. She won the Goya Award for Best New Actress in 2021 for her leading role in the film Ane. She is also known for her role in Akelarre and her work in theater.

== Early life and education ==
She studied Fine Arts at the University of the Basque Country, graduating in 2017. During her third year, she participated in an exchange program at the Universidad del Museo Social Argentino in Buenos Aires, Argentina. She later pursued a master's degree at the Complutense University of Madrid.

== Career ==
=== Music ===
Before entering the film industry, Laspiur was involved in music. She served as a backing vocalist for the band Koban and was also a vocalist for the group Nøgen. Her entry into acting came through her musical career when film producer Maite Arroitajauregi spotted her during a concert performance in Eibar.

=== Film and television ===
Laspiur made her acting debut in 2020 with three projects that premiered at the San Sebastián International Film Festival: the films Ane and Akelarre, and the television series Alardea.

Her breakthrough role came with Ane, directed by David Pérez Sañudo, where she played the title character. The performance earned her widespread critical acclaim and the Goya Award for Best New Actress in 2021, making her one of the most notable discoveries in Spanish cinema that year.

In Akelarre, directed by Pablo Agüero, she played Maider, one of the young women accused of witchcraft in the Basque Country during the 17th century. She also appeared in the 2021 film Maixabel in a supporting role.

=== Theater ===
In 2023, Laspiur appeared in the theatrical production Contra Ana, an autobiographical work about anorexia nervosa and eating disorders written and performed by Alma García. The play, directed by Paco Montes, also featured Carmen Climent and León Molina. The production received critical acclaim and won the D'Ensayo Prize in 2024, and was nominated for the Max Awards in 2025.

== Filmography ==
=== Film ===
Year	Title	Role	Notes
2020	Ane	Ane	Lead role
2020	Akelarre	Maider	
2020	Polvo somos	Ane	Short film
2021	Maixabel	Amiga de María	Supporting role
2025	Faisaien Irla	Laida	
2025	Karmele	Karmele	

=== Television ===
Year	Title	Role	Network	Notes
2020	Alardea	Katixa	ETB1	4 episodes

== Awards and nominations ==
Year	Award	Category	Work	Result
2021	Goya Awards	Best New Actress	Ane	Won
