= UMSA =

UMSA may refer to:

- Universidad Mayor de San Andrés
- Universidad del Museo Social Argentino
