= 1996 Buenos Aires City elections =

- Mayoral election
- 30 June 1996
- Turnout: 75.91%
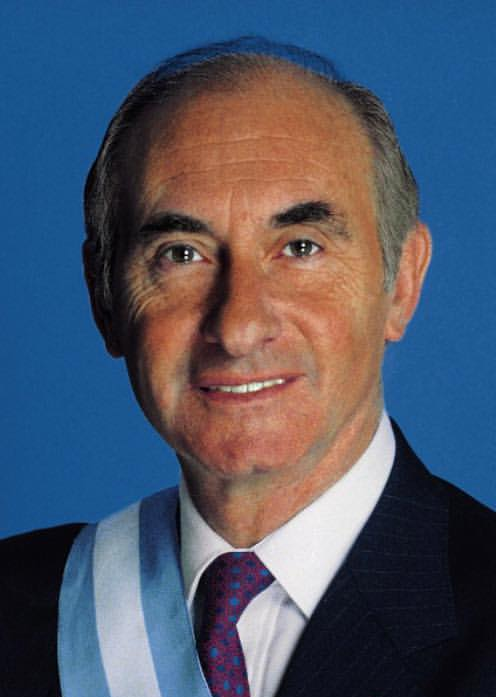

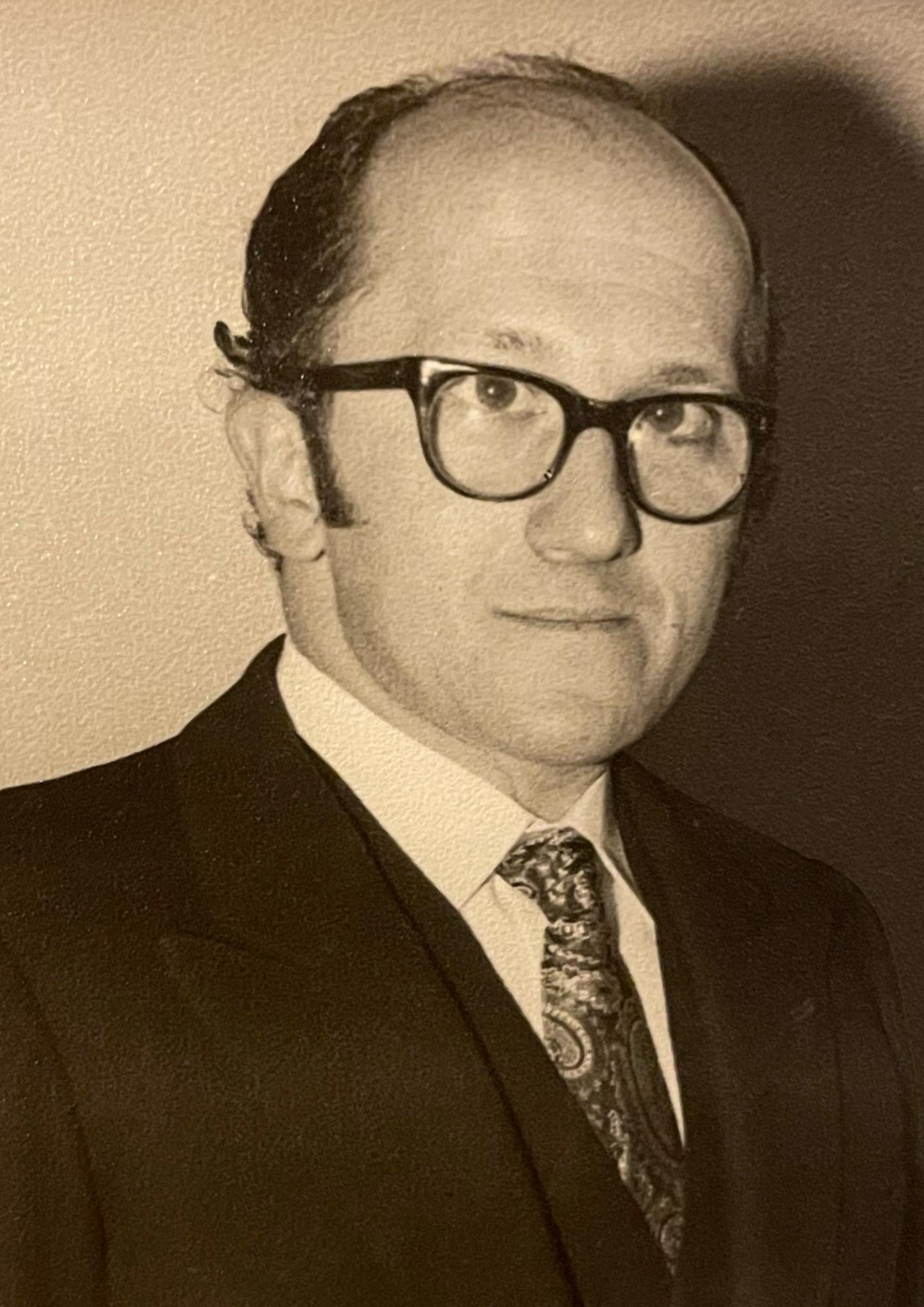

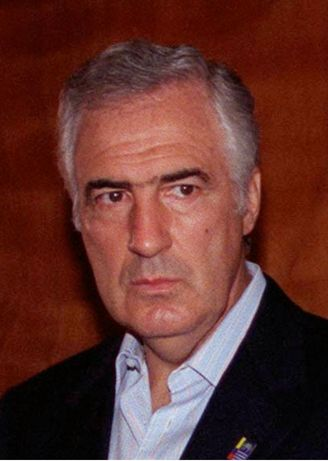

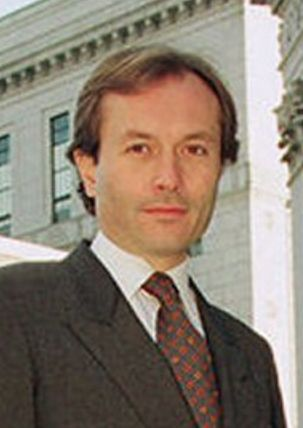
Nominee	Fernando de la Rúa	Norberto La Porta
Party	UCR	FREPASO
Running mate	Enrique Olivera	Aníbal Ibarra
Popular vote	753,335	500,542
Percentage	39.89%	26.50%
Nominee	Jorge Domínguez	Gustavo Béliz
Party	PJ	New Leadership
Running mate	Ana Kessler	Guillermo Francos
Popular vote	351,746	247,500
Percentage	18.62%	13.10%
- Results of the Chief of Government election by electoral circuit.
Mayor before election
Jorge Domínguez
PJ
Elected mayor
Fernando de la Rúa
UCR
- City Legislature
- 30 June 1996
- All 60 seats in the Constitutional Convention
- Turnout: 75.91%
Party	Leader	Vote %	Seats	+/–
FREPASO	Norberto La Porta	33.32	25	New
UCR	Fernando de la Rúa	26.16	19	New
PJ	Jorge Domínguez	14.45	11	New
ND	Gustavo Béliz	7.85	5	New
This lists parties that won seats. See the complete results below.

General elections were held in the City of Buenos Aires on 30 June 1996 to elect the city's first Chief of Government (mayor) and all 60 members of the Constituent Assembly, which was tasked with drafting and adopting a new constitution for Buenos Aires. These were the first elections ever held in the city to elect its local authorities, following the 1994 amendment of the Constitution of Argentina which granted autonomy to the city. Prior to the 1996 election, the mayor (intendente) was directly appointed by the President of Argentina.

In the mayoral election, Radical Civic Union senator Fernando de la Rúa won in the first round of voting with 39.89% of the vote. The electoral rules established for this election did not require for a second round of voting (which would be implemented by the 1996 Constitution of Buenos Aires, currently in place). Incumbent mayor Jorge Domínguez sought to continue in office but received only 18% of the vote.

The legislative election resulted in a Constitutional Assembly controlled by the FREPASO, an alliance of centre-left and left-wing parties.

== Background ==
Ever since the federalization of Buenos Aires in 1880, during the government of President Nicolás Avellaneda, the city of Buenos Aires – federal capital of Argentina – became a separate entity from Buenos Aires Province, operating as a non-autonomous city directly dependent on the government of Argentina. The Mayor of Buenos Aires (intendente) was from that point on appointed directly by the President of Argentina, while the city's Deliberative Council (Concejo Deliberante) served as the only democratically-elected local authority.

In the 1990s during the presidency of Carlos Menem, calls for Buenos Aires to become politically autonomous grew, and the issue was one of the main points of the 1993 Pact of Olivos, which led to the 1994 amendment of the Constitution of Argentina. The 1994 amendments (specifically article 129 of the new constitution) granted autonomy to the city, allowing it to vote for its own mayor for the first time in history.

== Candidates ==
Coalition	Mayoral candidate (party) Prior political experience	Vice mayoral candidate (party) Prior political experience	Parties
	Fernando de la Rúa (UCR); National Senator (1992–1996)	Enrique Olivera (UCR); National Deputy (1991–1995)	UCR; FPDJ; PGI; PSoDe; SO
FREPASO	Norberto La Porta (PSD); City Councillor (1989–1993)	Aníbal Ibarra (FG); City Councillor (1991–1996)	FG; PSD; PSP; PC; PI
	Jorge Domínguez (PJ); Mayor of Buenos Aires (1994–1996)	Ana Kessler (PJ); National Deputy (1993–1996)	PJ; Ucedé; PPDLJ
	Gustavo Béliz (ND); Minister of the Interior (1992–1993)	Guillermo Francos (ND); City Councillor (1985–1993)	ND; PD; PF

== Results ==
=== Chief of Government ===
Candidate	Running mate	Party	Votes	%
Fernando de la Rúa	Enrique Olivera	Radical Civic Union–FPDJ–PGI–PSoDe–SO	753,335	39.89
Norberto La Porta	Aníbal Ibarra	FREPASO	500,542	26.50
Jorge Domínguez	Ana Kessler	Justicialist Party–Ucedé–PPDLJ	351,746	18.62
Gustavo Béliz	Guillermo Francos	New Leadership–Centre Alliance	247,500	13.10
Lía Méndez	Liliana Beatriz Ambrosio	Humanist Party	9,239	0.49
Carlos Zamorano	Antonio Sofia	Front for the Unity of the People's Left	7,650	0.41
Santos Russomando	Elba Juana Martens	Authentic Socialist Party	5,390	0.29
Pablo Rieznik	Catalina Guagnini	Workers' Unity Front	5,064	0.27
Susana Sacchi	Gustavo de Biase	Socialist Workers' Party	4,340	0.23
Laura Enda Marrone	Marcos Roberto Britos	Movement for Socialism	3,811	0.20
Total			1,888,617	100.00
Valid votes			1,888,617	97.32
Invalid votes			15,650	0.81
Blank votes			36,332	1.87
Total votes			1,940,599	100.00
Registered voters/turnout			2,556,489	75.91

=== Legislature ===
Party	Votes	%	Seats
FREPASO	653,943	34.28	25
Radical Civic Union	513,328	26.91	19
Justicialist Party	283,643	14.87	11
New Leadership	154,086	8.08	5
Centre Alliance	90,645	4.75	0
Union of the Democratic Centre	57,234	3.00	0
Pensioners' Developmentalist Progressive Front	50,039	2.62	0
Party of the Intermediate Generation	22,848	1.20	0
Social Democratic Party	19,654	1.03	0
Solidarity	18,436	0.97	0
Humanist Party	9,821	0.51	0
Unity of the People's Left	8,777	0.46	0
Pensioners' Political Power	6,102	0.32	0
Authentic Socialist Party	5,744	0.30	0
Workers' Unity Front	4,912	0.26	0
Socialist Workers' Party	4,366	0.23	0
Movement for Socialism	3,872	0.20	0
Total	1,907,450	100.00	60
Valid votes	1,907,450	97.19	
Invalid votes	15,595	0.79	
Blank votes	39,509	2.01	
Total votes	1,962,554	100.00	
Registered voters/turnout	2,556,489	76.77	

== See also ==
- Pact of Olivos
- 1994 amendment of the Constitution of Argentina
- List of mayors and chiefs of government of Buenos Aires
