= Benito Juárez, Buenos Aires =

City in Buenos Aires Province, Argentina

Benito Juárez
- City
- Location in Argentina
- Coordinates: 37°40′S 59°47′W
- Country: Argentina
- Province: Buenos Aires
- Partido: Benito Juárez

Area
  - Total: 5,334 km^{2} (2,059 sq mi)
- Elevation: 199 m (653 ft)

Population (2010 census [INDEC])
  - Total: 14,279
  - Density: 2.677/km^{2} (6.933/sq mi)
- CPA Base: B 7020
- Area code: +54 2292
- Climate: Cfb

Benito Juárez is a city in Buenos Aires Province, Argentina. It is the administrative centre for Benito Juárez Partido. The town and its partido are named after former Mexican President Benito Juárez; the name was chosen to make a gesture of friendship between Argentina and Mexico.

== Geography ==
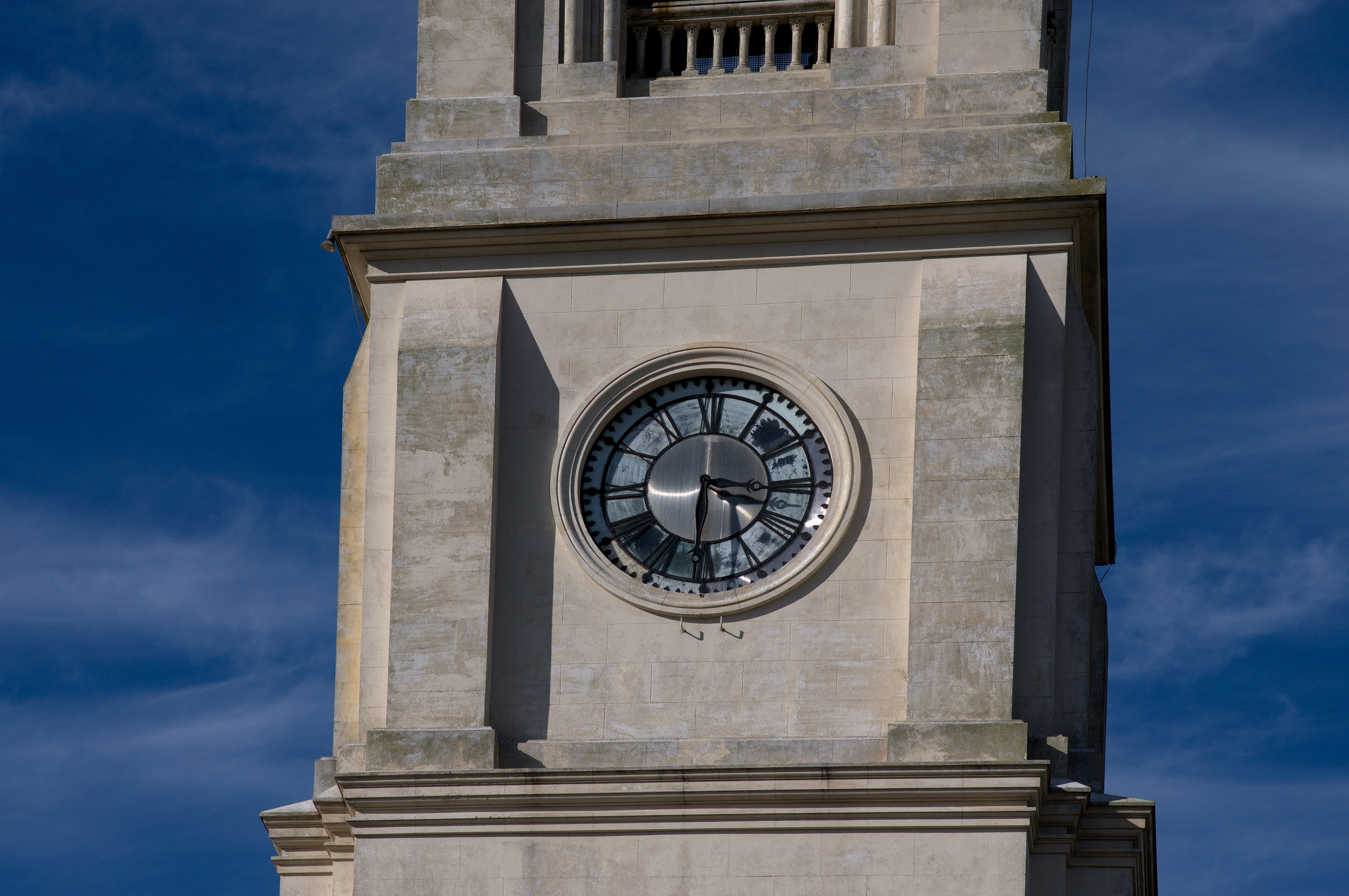
Clock in the Church of Our Lady of Carmen in Benito Juarez

Benito Juárez's main city had a population of 14,279 (INDEC, 2010), which represented a 3% growth since 2001 when the city had a population of 13,868.

=== Climate ===
Benito Juárez's climate is mild, with an average temperature of 15 °C (59 °F) and 1,030 millimetres (41 in) of precipitation annually. Minimum temperatures below −5 °C (23 °F) have been recorded in the winter months. Rainfall occurs throughout the year but more frequently between the months of October and March.

=== Orography ===
Towards the Partido of Tandil is set the Tandilia System, an ancient mountain range and one of the oldest rock formations on Earth. The small hills are about 1,640 ft (500 m) high and are all that remain of this once mighty mountain range. The best-known hills are: "San Martín de la Tinta", "Lomadas" and "El Sombrerito". The system is built on two billion year old igneous and metamorphic rock that most likely was a part of the supercontinent Rodinia when its coasts were uplifted during the Paleoproterozoic Era. Layers of stratified sediments built up on this base over hundreds of millions of years. Many of these sediments consist of quartz arenite and claystones containing an abundance of fossils and offer insights into life on Earth after the Cambrian–Ordovician extinction event of 488 million years ago.

== Notable individuals ==
- Julio Alak, mayor of La Plata (2023–present; 1991–2007) former Minister of Justice and Humans Rights, ex-CEO of Aerolíneas Argentinas
- Juan José Ebarlín, professional driver; TC Mouras 2012 champion in the ACTC 3° category
- Carlos Mosse, Vice Minister of Economy of Argentina (2003–2007)
- Atilio Marinelli (May 5, 1933 - July 24, 1978), movie and television actor during the decades of 1950, 1960, and 1970Atilio Marinelli
