= Juan José Álvarez =

Argentine politician

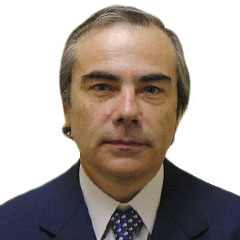

National Deputy
- In office 10 December 2003 – 10 December 2011
- Constituency: Buenos Aires

Minister of Justice, Security and Human Rights
- In office 10 July 2002 – 25 May 2003
- President: Eduardo Duhalde
- Preceded by: Jorge Vanossi
- Succeeded by: Gustavo Béliz

Mayor of Hurlingham
- In office 10 December 1995 – 10 October 2001
- Preceded by: District established
- Succeeded by: Luis Emilio Acuña

Personal details
- Born: 25 May 1955 (age 71) Hurlingham, Argentina
- Party: Justicialist Party (until 2008); Light Blue and White Union (2008–2015)
- Other political affiliations: PRO Union (2007–2009); Federal Peronism (2010–2013); Renewal Front (2013–2015)
- Education: Argentine Catholic University

Juan José "Juanjo" Álvarez (born 25 May 1955) is an Argentine former politician. He held a number of important posts throughout his career, serving as the first intendente (mayor) of Hurlingham Partido from 1995 to 2001, as Minister of Justice during the presidency of Eduardo Duhalde from 2002 to 2003, and as a National Deputy from 2003 to 2011.

Having belonged to the Justicialist Party throughout most of his career, in 2008 he joined the Light Blue and White Union, aligning himself with the opposition to then-president Cristina Fernández de Kirchner. He retired from politics in 2015.

== Early life and education ==
Álvarez was born on 25 May 1955 in Hurlingham, Buenos Aires. He enrolled to study law at the Pontifical Catholic University of Argentina in the 1970s, but was forced to briefly interrupt his studies following the death of his father. He graduated in the 1980s. In 1979 he married his wife, Graciela, with whom he fathered a son, born the same year.

== Political career ==
=== Provincial politics ===
Álvarez was elected as intendente (mayor) of the newly created Hurlingham Partido (which had, until then, been part of Morón Partido) in 1995. In 1997, he briefly requested for a leave of absence from his post to serve as Secretary of Community Relations in the provincial ministry of education, then led by Eduardo Duhalde. In 1998, he returned to Hurlingham and he was re-elected as mayor.

Toward the end of the 1990s, Álvarez formed, alongside Julio Alak and Alberto Balestrini, a trio of promising young Justicialist politicians known as the "Three Musketeers".

In October 2001, he resigned from his post as mayor to take office as Minister of Security of Buenos Aires Province in the cabinet of Carlos Ruckauf, whose presidential bid Álvarez supported. Ruckauf was known for his heavy-handed, "tough-on-crime" approach. Following the December 2001 riots, which saw looting and widespread police brutality, Álvarez was sacked from the provincial ministry. He was then designated by interim president Adolfo Rodríguez Saá as Secretary of Internal Security of Argentina. He remained in the position after Rodríguez Saá resigned from the presidency and Eduardo Duhalde became president in interim fashion.

In July 2002, he was appointed Minister of Justice, Security and Human Rights in the cabinet of Duhalde, replacing Jorge Vanossi. He remained in the position up to the end of Duhalde's presidency in May 2003. After that, he briefly returned to his post as Minister of Security of Buenos Aires in the cabinet of Governor Felipe Solá.

=== Congressional career ===
In the 2003 legislative election, he was elected to the National Chamber of Deputies on the Justicialist Party list in Buenos Aires Province.

In 2005, following the Cromañón disaster, he was appointed by City of Buenos Aires mayor Jorge Telerman as secretary of justice and security; he served in the post for less than a year. He then returned to his seat in the Chamber of Deputies.

Following the 2005 legislative election, Álvarez broke ranks with the government and formed part of the Federal Peronism bloc in the Chamber of Deputies. In the 2007 legislative election, he ran for re-election as the third candidate in the PRO Union list, led by Jorge Macri and Pinky Satragno. He also formed part of Francisco de Narváez's campaign team in his gubernatorial bid in Buenos Aires Province. He did not run for re-election in 2011. In 2013, he became campaign chief for Sergio Massa's Renewal Front.

In 2015 he formally retired from politics, citing his desire to work in private labor law in Hurlingham.

=== SIDE collaboration ===
A 2006 report by Página 12 journalist Victoria Ginzberg revealed Álvarez had collaborated for the Secretaría de Inteligencia (SIDE), Argentina's intelligence agency, in 1981, during the country's last military dictatorship. Álvarez himself wrote a letter to the SIDE requesting employment; the letter was cosigned by the junta's interior minister, Albano Harguindeguy, who praised Álvarez as an "excellent asset" who would "not disappoint". Álvarez later confirmed his collaboration with the SIDE, stating he had not worked as an operational or analysis agent.

Political offices
New district	Mayor of Hurlingham; 1995–2001	Succeeded by Luis Emilio Acuña
Preceded by Jorge Vanossi	Minister of Justice; 2002–2003	Succeeded by Gustavo Béliz
