= New Leadership =

Argentine political party

New Leadership Nueva Dirigencia
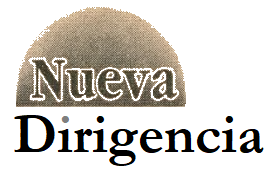
- Founded: 1996; 30 years ago
- Membership (2017): ▼3,915
- Ideology: Peronism
- Political position: Centre-right
- National affiliation: Juntos por el Cambio
- Seats in the Chamber of Deputies: 0 / 257
- Seats in the Senate: 0 / 72

New Leadership (Spanish: Nueva Dirigencia) is a minor political party in Argentina, founded in 1996 by Gustavo Béliz, a former member of the Justicialist Party. The party was founded to compete in the 1996 election in Buenos Aires, in which Béliz was candidate to Chief of Government (mayor). Following moderate successes in Buenos Aires, the party joined the Front for Victory of President Néstor Kirchner, and Béliz was Kirchner's Justice Minister until 2004, when he denounced the government and left Argentina to work in the Inter-American Development Bank in the United States.

The party has decreased in importance since then, and presently has legal recognition only in the City of Buenos Aires, in Buenos Aires Province, and in San Juan. A request to grant the party recognition in Corrientes Province was rejected by the province's judiciary in 2017. It is currently part of the Juntos por el Cambio alliance.
