= Pheasant Island (film) =

- Film poster
- Basque: Faisaien Irla
- Directed by: Asier Urbieta
- Screenplay by: Asier Urbieta; Andoni de Carlos
- Produced by: Ibon Cormenzana; Ignasi Estapé; Sandra Tapia Díaz; Ángel Durández
- Starring: Jone Laspiur; Sambou Diaby; Aia Kruse; Ibrahima Kone; Ximun Fuchs; Jon Olivares; Rodonny Perriere; Itziar Ituño; Josean Bengoetxea
- Cinematography: Pau Castejón Úbeda
- Edited by: Maialen Sarasua Oliden
- Music by: Rüdiger
- Production companies: Arcadia Motion Pictures; La Tentación Producciones; Galatea Films; La Fidèle Production
- Distributed by: BTeam Pictures (Spain); La Fidèle Production (France)
- Release dates: January 2025 (GFF); 23 April 2025 (France); 25 April 2025 (Spain)
- Countries: Spain; France
- Languages: Basque; French; Spanish

Pheasant Island (Basque: Faisaien Irla) is a 2025 thriller film directed by Asier Urbieta. It stars Jone Laspiur and Sambou Diaby.

It had its world premiere at the 48th Göteborg Film Festival ahead of its theatrical release in France and Spain in April 2025.

== Plot ==
In the river marking the border between France and Spain lies the tiny Pheasant Island—an uninhabited place on the Bidasoa river that switches between Spanish and French sovereignty every six months. As they take a walk nearby, Laida and Sambou, a couple, take notice of two people swimming across the river. Laida jumps without thinking, while Sambou stands at the border frozen. She saves the refugee Nassim from drowning, but the corpse of his friend Omar appears soon afterwards at the shore of Pheasant Island. This event changes their relation in a profound way.

== Cast ==
- Jone Laspiur as Laida
- Sambou Diaby as Sambou
- Ibrahima Kone as Nassim
- Aia Kruse as Nerea
- Ximun Fuchs as Mikel
- Jon Olivares as Peru
- Itziar Ituño as Tania
- Josean Bengoetxea as Koldo

== Production ==
The film is an Arcadia Motion Pictures, La Tentación Producciones and Galatea Films production alongside La Fidèle Production, with the participation of EiTB and Movistar Plus+. It was shot in Basque and French (primarily) as well as Spanish. Shooting locations included Irun, San Sebastián, and Hendaye.

== Release ==
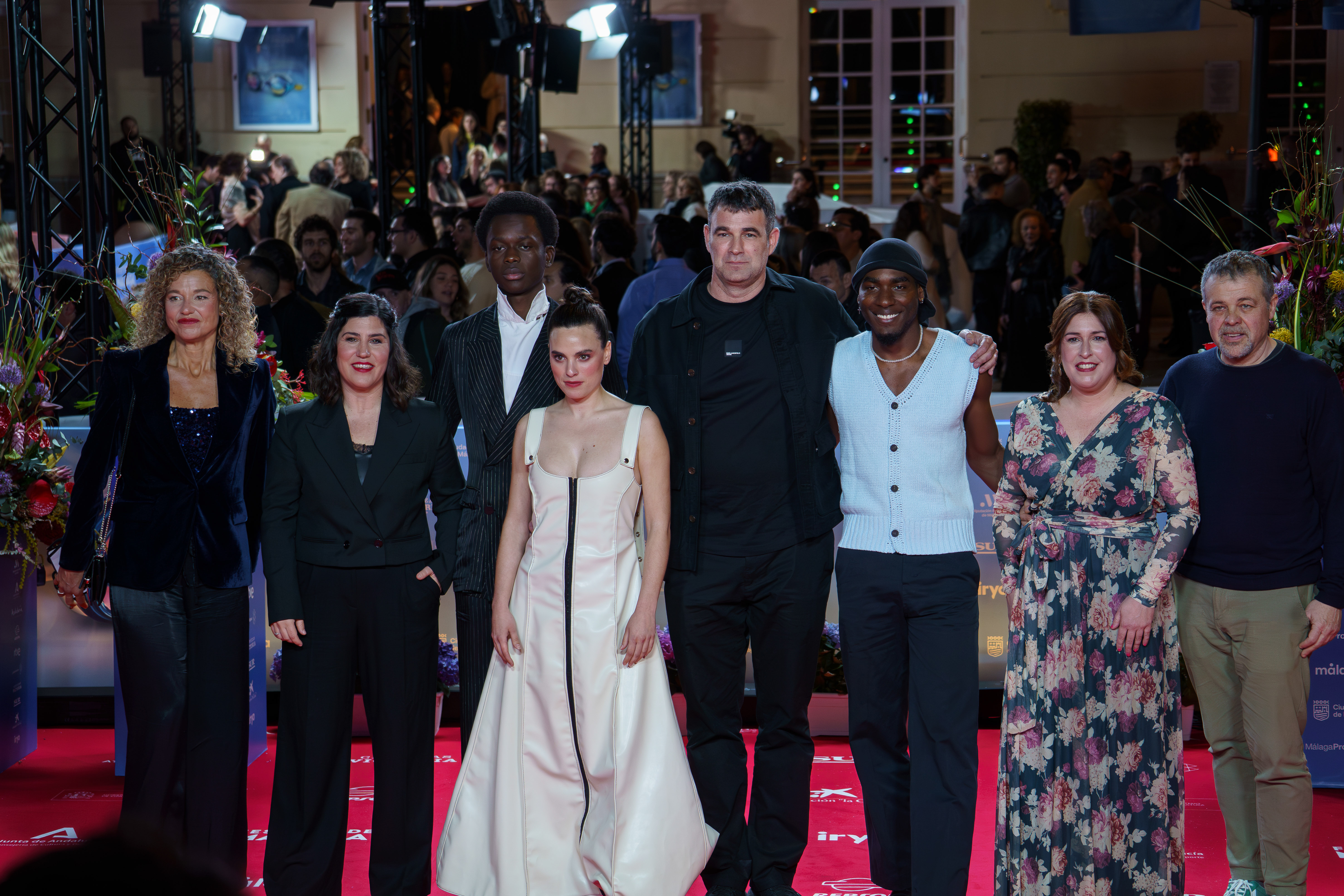
Cast and crew members attending the 2025 Málaga Film Festival

Selected in the slate of the 48th Göteborg Film Festival (GFF), the film had its world premiere in January 2025. It was also programmed in a non-competitive slot of the 28th Málaga Film Festival. La Fidèle Production scheduled a French release for 23 April 2025. Distributed by BTeam Pictures, it was released theatrically in Spain on 25 April 2025.

== Reception ==
Vittoria Scarpa of Cineuropa deemed the film to be worth watching because it "asks compelling questions", "sheds light on a little-explored socio-geographical reality", and "adds unexpected poetic touches to its fundamentally realist approach".

Javier Ocaña of Cinemanía lamented Pheasant Island to be one example of those films with "screenplays about interesting topics, but [also] somewhat skeletal due to a lack of ambition", falling short both as social cinema and, even further, as a thriller.

== See also ==
- List of Spanish films of 2025
- List of French films of 2025
