= Juan Bautista Mahiques =

Argentine politician (born 1980)

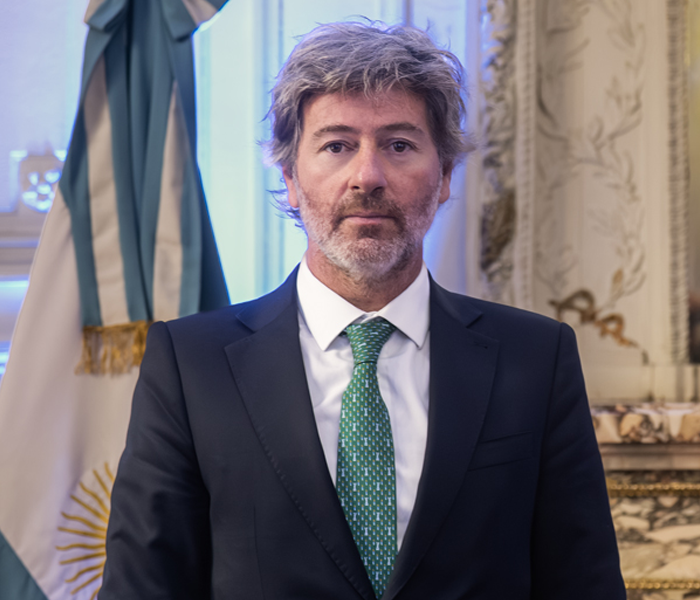
- Official portrait, 2026.

Minister of Justice
- Incumbent
- Assumed office 8 March 2026
- President: Javier Milei
- Preceded by: Mariano Cúneo Libarona

Personal details
- Born: 15 August 1980 (age 46)
- Party: Independent

Juan Bautista Mahiques (Spanish pronunciation: [ˈxwan bawˈtista maˈikes]; born 15 August 1980) is an Argentine politician serving as minister of justice since 2025. He has served as president of the International Association of Prosecutors since 2022. From 2019 to 2026, he served as attorney general of Buenos Aires.

Political offices
Preceded by Mariano Cúneo Libarona	Minister of Justice; 2026–present	Incumbent
