= Carlos Grosso =

Argentine politician

Carlos Alfredo Grosso

Mayor of Buenos Aires
- In office 8 July 1989 – 26 October 1992
- Preceded by: Facundo Suárez Lastra
- Succeeded by: Saúl Bouer

Personal details
- Born: 1943 Pampa del Infierno, Chaco, Argentina
- Party: Justicialist Party

Carlos Alfredo Grosso (born 1943) is an Argentine politician who was intendente (mayor) of Buenos Aires from 1989 to 1992. A member of the Justicialist Party, he was appointed by President Carlos Menem as a successor for Facundo Suárez Lastra.
