= Benito Juárez Partido =

Benito Juárez Partido de Benito Juárez
- Department
- Location of Benito Juárez Partido in Buenos Aires Province
- Coordinates: 37°49′S 57°49′W
- Country: Argentina
- Established: 31 October 1867
- Founder: provincial law
- Seat: Benito Juárez

Government
  - Intendant: Julio César Marini (FPV)

Area
  - Total: 5,285 km^{2} (2,041 sq mi)

Population
  - Total: 20,402
  - Density: 3.860/km^{2} (9.998/sq mi)
- Demonym: Juarense
- Postal Code: B7020
- IFAM: BUE012
- Area Code: 02292
- Website: www.benitojuarez.gov.ar

Benito Juárez is a partido (second level administrative subdivision) in the south-central part of Buenos Aires Province in Argentina.

The provincial subdivision has a population of 20,402 inhabitants in an area of 5,285 km^{2} (2,041 sq mi), and its capital city is Benito Juárez. Around 14,000 of its inhabitants live in the capital town, 3,200 in the towns of Barker and Villa Cacique, and the rest in smaller villages and rural areas. The main economic activities are agriculture and cattle-raising. The Partido and its capital town, are named after former Mexican President Benito Juárez. The name was chosen as a gesture of friendship between Argentina and México

== History ==
The historical origin of Benito Juarez Partido does not differ from that of other partidos in the area: to constitute a civilizing advance into the "desert," that vast area of the pampas inhabited by natives. The area around Benito Juarez, with its historical reference points being "La Tinta" and "San Antonio," was already within the lands that the national government planned to incorporate into the "civilized life of the country." This lands constituted the vast extension where the famous native chief Cafulcura ruled, with his headquarters located in the area known as Salinas Grandes. It was in "La Tinta" (also known as "San Martin de La Tinta") where in 1820, just 10 years after the May Revolution, the first struggle between natives and "christians" in the Partido took place. In 1837, the military garrison "La Tinta" or "Colonquelu"(which in araucano means "where there was death") was settled. It was in the charge of the chief of the South Frontier, Colonel Narciso del Valle. For the history of Benito Juarez, the Forts (and then towns) of Tandil and Azul, were important, since from those places the first settlers arrived to colonize the lands. That way, many isolated settlements were established, that with time would become the center for important social and political transformations. In the 1850s and following decades the biggest worry by the pioneers was the defence against the natives, who raze the region in order the steal the cattle, generating important human and economic loses. The land-owners petitioned to the national and provincial governments, and the latter sent military forces to the region in order to protect their interests. In 1855, the "Canton de San Antonio" is created in the proximities of the lagoon of the same name. One of the bloodiest clashes between natives and "christians" in the pampas took place there.

=== The Battle of San Antonio de Iraola ===
Commander Nicanor Otamendi, from the Azul fort, under the orders of General Manuel Hornos, received the instructions to repeal the invasion by the natives. The force of Otamento consisted of only 126 men. Not long before the march begun, the cavalry was suddenly reached by fast and large groups of natives that slowed their advance. On 13 September 1855 more than 2,000 natives under the command of Yanquetruz attacked Otamendi at "San Antonio de Iraola". The natives came out victorious after a courageous fight. Otamendi and most of his men were killed (according to some sources, only one or two soldiers saved their lives). In 1857 peace treated were held between the natives and the government, which brought relative peace to the region.

=== The Birth of the Partido ===
In order to better manage the lands of the south, by Decree 544 of 31 August 1865 ten new partidos were created in Buenos Aires Province: Castelli, Tuyu, Ayacucho, Balcarse, Necochea, Tres Arroyos, Arenales, Rauch, 9 de Julio and Lincoln. This allowed the government to reduced distances (civil and military) and provided a better administration for the frontier and its settlements. The land-owners of the area of Benito Juarez, believed in the necessity of the creation of a new Partido to allow them overcome the difficulties of the large extension of Necochea Partido (to which they belonged to), since the authorities resided on the Atlantic coast which was hard to reach because of the practically nonexistent roads. The land-owners, then, requested Mariano Roldan (the owner of a cattle establishment in the area of Tedin Uriburu) to petition to the authorities, since he had influential relatives and friends in Buenos Aires. On 13 November 1866 Roldan wrote to his friend Dardo Rocha (who would later be governor of Buenos Aires) asking for information and requesting to speed up the procedures that had already been initiated. Roldan then met governor Adolfo Alsina of Buenos Aires to give him a letter with the official request for the creation of the new Partido, suggesting that him to "name the new Partido Juarez as homage to the Mexican patriot Benito Juarez". He also sent a letter signed by the settlers of the area to the President of the Chamber of Representatives, Antonio Cambaceres. Given the urging request by those who had defied the dangers of the pampas, the Chamber passed the request by approving the Ley 521 on 29 October 1867. But the final document was signed by governor Adolfo Alsina and his minister Nicolas Avellaneda on 31 October 1867. The lands for the new Partido were taken from the Necochea Partido. In December 1867 the Minister of Government designated Mariano Roldan as the first Juez de Paz, an assignment he accepted in February 1868. Immediately, he communicated that the seat for the authorities would be, until the creation of a town, his own estancia: "El Porvenir", and at the same time, he requested armour and uniforms for the creation of a police force.

== Towns ==
- Benito Juárez
- Barker
- Coronel Bunge
- Estación Gaviña
- Estación López
- Estación Mariano Roldán
- Paraje El Luchador
- Tedín Uriburu
- Villa Cacique

== Population ==
According to the 2010 National Census population reaches 20.402 inhabitants.

Population evolution in Benito Juárez Partido
	1869	1895	1914	1947	1960	1970	1980	1991	2001	2010
Population	1.610	9.318	18.069	15.678	17.303	21.072	20.225	20.350	19.443	20.402
Change	-	+478,75%	+93,91%	-13,23%	+10,36%	+21,78%	-4,01%	+0,61%	-4,45%	+4.93%

Source: Instituto Nacional de Estadísticas y Censos, INDEC
