= Inspector General of Justice =

- Formation: 1893-11-21
- Headquarters: Avenida Paseo Colón 285, Buenos Aires
- Location: Argentina
- Leader: Dr. Daniel Roque Vítolo
- Parent organization: Ministry of Justice
- Website: argentina.gob.ar/justicia/igj

The Inspector General of Justice (Inspección General de Justicia, IGJ) is a regulatory body under the Ministry of Justice in Argentina. It is responsible for overseeing the Public Registry of limited companies in the Autonomous City of Buenos Aires, including the registration and legal supervision of limited companies, civil entities, and savings and loan associations at the national level.

== Civil entities ==
Civil entities in Argentina must comply with a series of administrative obligations to remain operational. These include the annual presentation of economic management, updating authorities, and maintaining an updated headquarters. Meeting these obligations is a prerequisite to accessing benefits provided by regulations, such as exemption from taxes before the Administración Federal de Ingresos Públicos.

=== Foundations ===
Foundations are established through the contribution of assets from one or more individuals, whether physical or legal, and are aimed at fulfilling a specific public good purpose. To establish a foundation, it is essential to have an initial asset equivalent to ten minimum living wages. Foundations require a public instrument for their establishment and must obtain state authorization to operate.

=== Civil Associations ===
Civil associations are organizations formed by a group of people who come together with a specific social objective, without profit motives. These entities must also have an initial asset that ensures the fulfillment of their goals, with specific amounts varying according to the nature of the association. Civil associations are classified into three categories based on their annual income.
