= Karmele (film) =

- Film poster
- Directed by: Asier Altuna Iza
- Screenplay by: Asier Altuna Iza
- Based on: Elkarrekin esnatzeko ordua by Kirmen Uribe
- Produced by: Marian Fernández Pascal
- Starring: Jone Laspiur; Eneko Sagardoy
- Cinematography: Javier Agirre
- Edited by: Laurent Dufreche
- Music by: Aitor Etxebarria
- Distributed by: Caramel Films
- Release dates: 22 September 2025 (Zinemaldia); 10 October 2025 (Spain)
- Country: Spain
- Languages: Basque; Spanish; French

Karmele is a 2025 historical drama film written and directed by Asier Altuna based on the novel Elkarrekin esnatzeko ordua by Kirmen Uribe. It stars Jone Laspiur and Eneko Sagardoy.

== Plot ==
Set in the 20th century, the plot follows the plight of Basque nurse Karmele, who exiles to France in the aftermath of the Civil War and marries jazz trumpet player Txomin. She then leaves for Venezuela.

== Cast ==
- Jone Laspiur as Karmele
- Eneko Sagardoy as Txomin
- Nagore Aranburu
- Javier Barandiaran

== Production ==
Karmele is a Txintxua Films and Esnatzeko Ordua Films AIE production with the participation of EiTB and RTVE, the collaboration of Gastibeltza Filmak and the backing from the Région Nouvelle-Aquitaine, the Basque Government and Diputación Foral de Gipuzkoa. The film is based on the novel Elkarrekin esnatzeko ordua (2016) by Kirmen Uribe, based in turn in the real-life story of Karmele Urresti and Txomin Letamendi. Javier Agirre worked as cinematographer. Shooting locations included Bilbao.

== Release ==
Karmele was presented in a special screening of the 73rd San Sebastián International Film Festival on 22 September 2025. Distributed by Caramel Films, it is scheduled to be released theatrically in Spain on 10 October 2025.

Filmax acquired international sales on the film.

== See also ==
- List of Spanish films of 2025
