= Oscar Camilión =

Argentine lawyer and diplomat

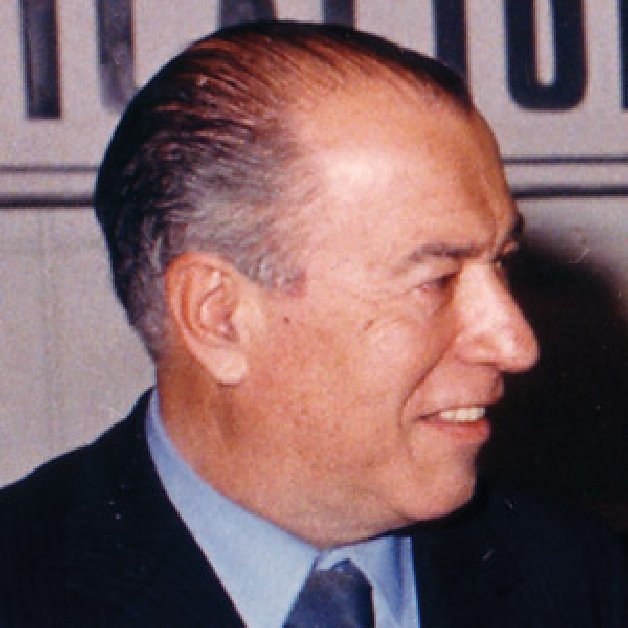
- Oscar Camilión in 1987

Minister of Defense
- In office 9 December 1993 – 7 August 1996
- President: Carlos Menem
- Preceded by: Antonio Erman González
- Succeeded by: Jorge Domínguez

Minister of Foreign Affairs and Worship
- In office 29 March 1981 – 12 December 1981
- President: Roberto Eduardo Viola
- Preceded by: Carlos Washington Pastor
- Succeeded by: Nicanor Costa Méndez

Ambassador to Brazil
- In office 1976–1981
- President: Jorge Rafael Videla

Personal details
- Born: Oscar Héctor Camilión; 6 January 1930 Buenos Aires, Argentina
- Died: 12 February 2016 (aged 86) Buenos Aires, Argentina
- Party: Integration and Development Movement
- Education: University of Buenos Aires
- Occupation: diplomat, politician
- Profession: lawyer, professor

Oscar Héctor Camilión (6 January 1930 – 12 February 2016) was an Argentine lawyer and diplomat.

Born in 1930, Camilión earned a law degree from the University of Buenos Aires.

He began his political career as chief of staff at the Ministry of Foreign Affairs and Worship during the presidency of Arturo Frondizi. From 1965 to 1972, he worked for the Argentina newspaper Clarín.

Following the 1976 coup d’état, he was appointed ambassador to Brazil by President Jorge Rafael Videla. Videla’s successor, Roberto Eduardo Viola, later named him foreign minister. After Viola was removed in another coup, Camilión served as a representative of the United Nations Secretary-General.

He returned to government as minister of defense from 1993 to 1996 under President Carlos Menem.

Camilión was a member of the Integration and Development Movement (MID), a right-leaning political party in Argentina.

He died in Buenos Aires in 2016 at age 86.

== See also ==
- Government of Argentina
- Military coups in Argentina
- Politics of Argentina
