= Norberto La Porta =

Argentine politician

Norberto Luis La Porta
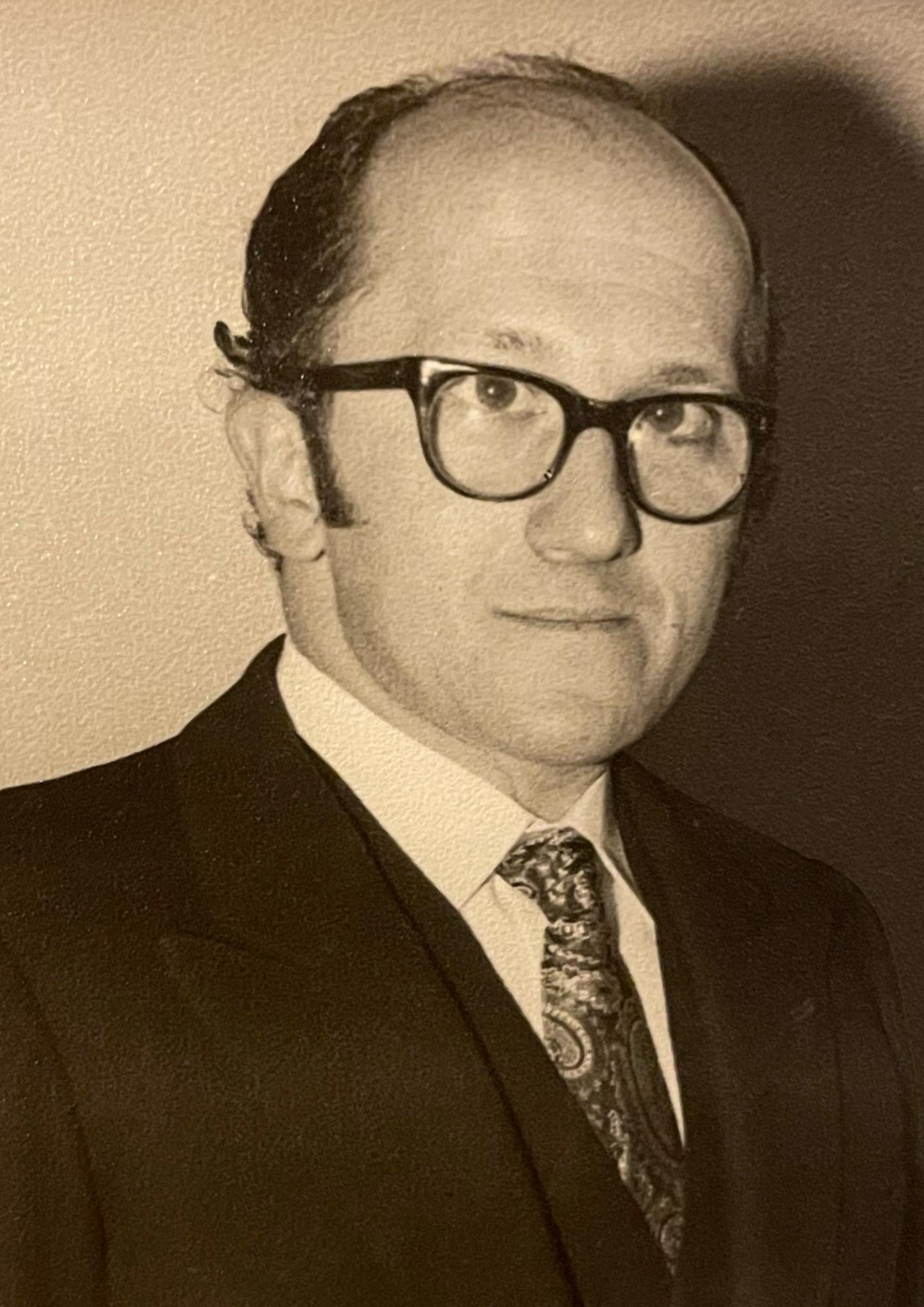

Legislator of Buenos Aires City
- In office December 10, 2003 – April 1, 2007
- Succeeded by: Martín Hourest

Secretary of Environment and Regional Development of the City of Buenos Aires
- In office 1 March 1999 – 14 May 2002
- Appointed by: Fernando De la Rúa (1999); Enrique Olivera (1999-2000); Aníbal Ibarra (2000-2002)
- Preceded by: Enrique García Espil
- Succeeded by: Eduardo Ricciutti

Councilor of Buenos Aires City
- In office 10 December 1989 – 10 December 1993

Conventional Constituent of Argentina
- In office 30 May 1994 – 22 August 1994

Personal details
- Born: June 22, 1938 Parque Chacabuco, Buenos Aires, Argentina
- Died: April 1, 2007 (68) Hospital Italiano, Almagro, Buenos Aires, Argentina
- Party: Socialist Party (2002-2007); Democratic Socialist Party (until 2002)
- Spouse: Silvia Inés Foster
- Children: María Florencia, Natalia, and Nicolás Felipe La Porta
- Parent(s): Felipe La Porta; Ángela Rosa Delucchi
- Education: Mariano Acosta School; University of Buenos Aires
- Occupation: Politician
- Profession: Lawyer
- Awards: Orden del Porteño; Orden del Buzón; Premio Juntos Educar

Norberto Luis La Porta (1938–2007) was an Argentine politician and teacher. He was a leader of the Argentine Socialist Party.

== Career ==
He was actively involved in youth organizations and was a university supporter. He founded the magazine Future and was twice the news editor at The Vanguard.

- 1989: He was elected counselor porteño. He made allegations against the then Mayor Carlos Grosso. He resigned as vice president of the Public Service Commission after dissenting from the idea of "school shopping".
- 1994: He attended the Constitutional Convention. He chaired the conventional block Socialist Unity.
- 1996: He was a candidate for the Frepaso coalition that he helped found in the first election for mayor of Buenos Aires. He finished second behind Fernando de la Rua.
- 1999: During the reign of Enrique Olivera (following the resignation of De la Rua to become president), he became Secretary of Environment.
- 1999: He remained Secretary of the Environment during the term of Aníbal Ibarra.
- August 24, 2003: He was elected deputy mayor of Buenos Aires. He chaired the Committee on Culture of the Legislature.

== Personal life ==
He received a teaching degree and then studied law at the University of Buenos Aires. He left in the third year and joined a political union.

La Porta married Silvia Ines Foster and had three children: Mary Florence, Natalia and Nicholas. He died on April 1 of 2007 at the Italian Hospital, where he remained hospitalized for two weeks because of a malignant tumor.

He was buried in the private cemetery Memorial Park, Pilar.
