= Saúl Bouer =

Argentine politician (1937–2017)

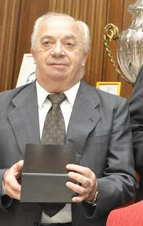

67th Mayor of Buenos Aires
- In office 26 October 1992 – 5 September 1994
- Preceded by: Carlos Grosso
- Succeeded by: Jorge Domínguez

Personal details
- Born: 6 February 1937; Buenos Aires, Argentina
- Died: 4 February 2017 (aged 79); Buenos Aires, Argentina
- Political party: Justicialist Party

Saúl Bouer (6 February 1937 – 4 February 2017) was an Argentine politician and economist who served as the penultimate intendente (mayor) of Buenos Aires.

== Political career ==
Bouer began his political career within the Justicialist Party. In 1983, he joined Ítalo Lúder's presidential campaign as a prospective cabinet member.

On 26 October 1992, Bouer was appointed as intendente (mayor) of Buenos Aires by President Carlos Menem, following Carlos Grosso's resignation. Bouer's administration enforced strict debt collection policies for municipal tax arrears. Key developments during his tenure included the deployment of 280 fiscal agents in December 1993 to strengthen revenue collection.

Bouer was mayor at the time of the AMIA terrorist attack, on 18 July 1994, which killed 85 and injured 300.

On 5 September 1994, following the 1994 constitutional assembly elections, Menem appointed Jorge Domínguez to replace Bouer as mayor.

In 1998 he was appointed as director of ANSES. During his tenure he prioritized clearing backlogged pension claims, acknowledging over 120,000 pending cases.

Political offices
Preceded by Carlos Grosso	Mayor of Buenos Aires; 1992–1994	Succeeded by Jorge Domínguez
