= Jorge Domínguez (politician) =

Argentine politician (1945–2022)

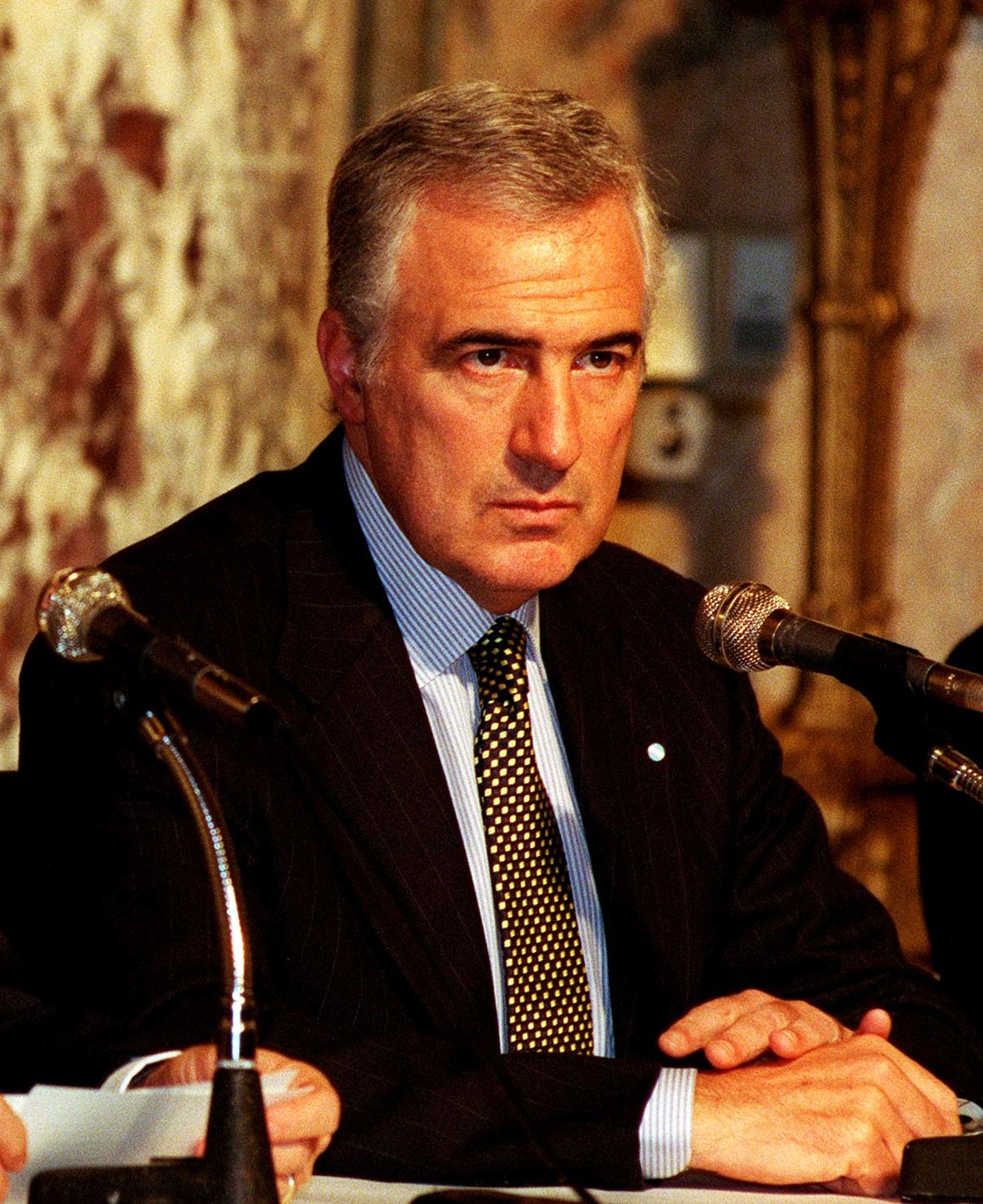
- Domínguez in 1998

Minister of Defense
- In office 7 August 1996 – 10 December 1999
- President: Carlos Menem
- Preceded by: Oscar Camilión
- Succeeded by: Ricardo López Murphy

68th Mayor of Buenos Aires
- In office 5 September 1994 – 6 August 1996
- Preceded by: Saúl Bouer
- Succeeded by: Fernando de la Rúa (as Chief of Government)

National Deputy
- In office 16 August 1989 – 21 September 1991
- Constituency: Buenos Aires

Personal details
- Born: 20 March 1945 Buenos Aires, Argentina
- Died: 24 August 2022 (aged 77) Buenos Aires, Argentina
- Party: Justicialist Party

Jorge Manuel Rogelio Domínguez (20 March 1945 – 24 August 2022) was an Argentine politician of the Justicialist Party. He was appointed mayor of Buenos Aires in 1994. The 1994 amendment of the Argentine Constitution changed the status of the city, turning the mayor into an elected office. He ran for the mayoral elections in 1996, and lost to the radical Fernando de la Rúa. He then served as minister of defense for president Carlos Menem to the end of his term of office in 1999.

Political offices
Preceded by Saúl Bouer	Mayor of Buenos Aires; 1994–1996	Succeeded by Fernando de la Rúa as Chief of Government
Preceded by Oscar Camilión	Minister of Defense; 1996–1999	Succeeded by Ricardo López Murphy
