= Alberto Iribarne =

Argentinian lawyer (1950–2026)

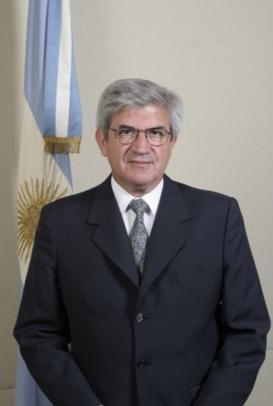

Minister of Justice
- In office 26 July 2005 – 10 December 2007
- President: Néstor Kirchner
- Preceded by: Horacio Rosatti
- Succeeded by: Aníbal Fernández

Personal details
- Born: Alberto Juan Bautista Iribarne; 2 August 1950 Buenos Aires, Argentina
- Died: 5 September 2026 (aged 76)
- Party: Justicialist Party
- Education: University of Buenos Aires

Alberto Juan Bautista Iribarne (2 August 1950 – 5 September 2026) was an Argentinian lawyer and politician, who served as minister of justice from 2005 and 2007.

== Life and career ==
Iribarne was born in Buenos Aires on 2 August 1950. After completing secondary studies at the Colegio Nacional de Buenos Aires, he began law studies at the University of Buenos Aires. Graduating as a lawyer at the age of twenty-three, he then taught classes at the university.

In 1979 Iribarne participated in the defense of trade union leaders who had been detained after organizing a general strike against the military dictatorship in power at the time. He also took part in the preparation of a presentation on the dictatorship by the Justicialist Party before the Inter-American Commission on Human Rights. He held various positions within the Justicialist Party after the return to democracy in 1983, and was elected to the Chamber of Deputies in 1992.

During the presidency of Carlos Menem, Iribarne served as deputy minister of the interior, but resigned in 1997. In 2000 he managed the presidential campaign of Eduardo Duhalde, with whom he had established a close political relationship. During Duhalde's interim presidency in 2002, Iribarne was appointed head of the Casa de Moneda and the Secretariat of Internal Security.

After Néstor Kirchner was elected president in 2003, Iribarne was made head of the General Office of the Comptroller. In 2005 he was appointed minister of justice, an office which he held until the end of Kirchner's presidency in 2007. Iribarne was then designated by new president Cristina Fernández de Kirchner as ambassador to the Holy See, but his diplomatic approval was refused; according to some reports, this was because he was divorced. In 2019 Iribarne was designated the Ambassador to Uruguay by president Alberto Fernández, and served until 2023.

Iribarne died on 5 September 2026, at the age of 76.
