= Pablo Bruera =

Argentine politician (born 1964)

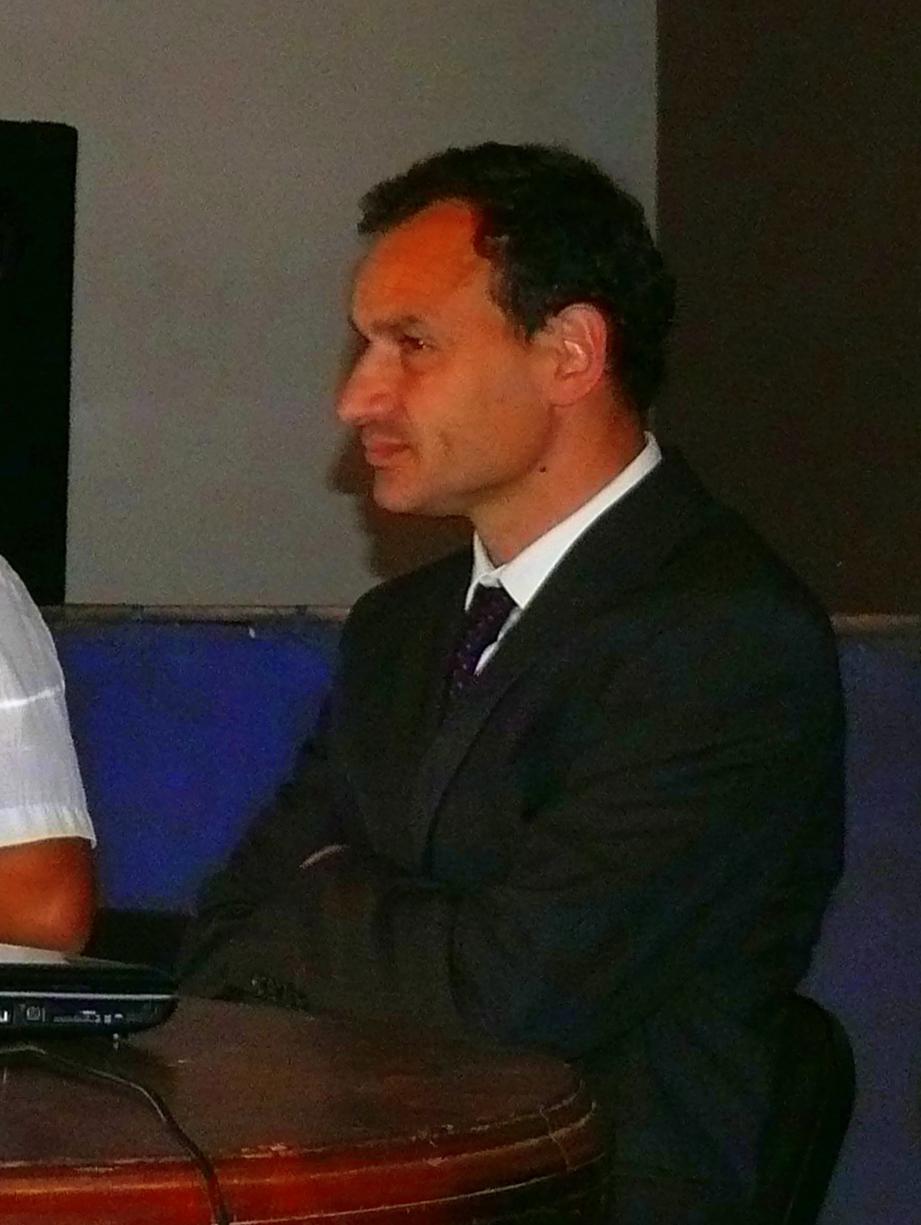
Pablo Bruera, mayor of La Plata.

Pablo Oscar Bruera (born 1 October 1964) is an Argentine politician, who was the mayor of La Plata, the capital of Buenos Aires province, from 2007 to 2015. On December 9, 2007, Bruera replaced incumbent Julio Alak. His run as mayor ended in 2015 when he was replaced by Julio Garro.

Bruera's nephew, Lucas, is a professional footballer.
