= Lucas Bruera =

Argentine footballer (born 1997)

Personal information
- Full name: Lucas Mariano Bruera
- Date of birth: 19 October 1997 (age 29)
- Place of birth: La Plata, Argentina
- Height: 1.84 m (6 ft 0 in)
- Position: Goalkeeper

Team information
- Current team: Estudiantes RC (on loan from Carabobo)
- Number: 1

Youth career
- ADAFI
- Estudiantes

Senior career*
Years	Team	Apps	(Gls)
2016	Estudiantes	0	(0)
2017–2018	Independiente	0	(0)
2018–2020	Chacarita Juniors	6	(0)
2020–2021	Villa Dálmine	2	(0)
2022–2023	Estudiantes Caseros	22	(0)
2023	Aldosivi	18	(0)
2023–	Carabobo	98	(0)
2026–	→ Estudiantes RC (loan)	9	(0)
- * Club domestic league appearances and goals as of 17:32, 8 November 2026 (UTC)

Lucas Mariano Bruera (born 19 October 1997) is an Argentine professional footballer who plays as a goalkeeper for Estudiantes RC, on loan from Liga FUTVE club Carabobo.

== Club career ==
Bruera's career began with ADAFI and Estudiantes. Nelson Vivas selected the goalkeeper on the bench versus Rosario Central on 15 October 2016, though he never made a competitive appearance. In January 2017, Bruera moved across the Primera División to Independiente. In July 2018, Bruera was signed by Chacarita Juniors of Primera B Nacional. He had almost signed with Gimnasia y Esgrima, but the move fell through after derogatory comments Bruera made about the club on Twitter whilst with rivals Estudiantes. Having been an unused substitute fourteen times in 2018–19, his bow came in March 2019 against Nueva Chicago.

After making five further appearances for Chacarita in 2018–19, the goalkeeper didn't appear competitively in 2019–20. August 2020 saw Bruera join Villa Dálmine. In January 2022, Bruera moved to Estudiantes de Buenos Aires.

In December 2022, he joined Aldosivi in Primera División. He only remained with the club for one season.

In January 2024, he joined Carabobo, which plays in Liga FUTVE.

In December 2024, at the age of 27, he graduated with a law degree from the National University of La Plata.

== International career ==
Bruera had experience at U20 level with Argentina. He was a part of their squad for the 2016 L'Alcúdia International Tournament in Spain; where they finished as runners-up.

== Personal life ==
Bruera is the nephew of former La Plata mayor Pablo Bruera.

== Career statistics ==
As of 30 September 2020.

Appearances and goals by club, season and competition
Club	Season	League			Cup		League Cup		Continental		Other		Total	
Club	Season	Division	Apps	Goals	Apps	Goals	Apps	Goals	Apps	Goals	Apps	Goals	Apps	Goals
Estudiantes	2016–17	Primera División	0	0	0	0	—		0	0	0	0	0	0
Independiente	2016–17	Primera División	0	0	0	0	—		0	0	0	0	0	0
Independiente	2017–18	Primera División	0	0	0	0	—		0	0	0	0	0	0
Independiente	Total		0	0	0	0	—		0	0	0	0	0	0
Chacarita Juniors	2018–19	Primera B Nacional	6	0	0	0	—		—		0	0	6	0
Chacarita Juniors	2019–20	Primera B Nacional	0	0	0	0	—		—		0	0	0	0
Chacarita Juniors	Total		6	0	0	0	—		—		0	0	6	0
Villa Dálmine	2020–21	Primera B Nacional	0	0	0	0	—		—		0	0	0	0
Career total			6	0	0	0	—		—		0	0	6	0

== Honours ==
=== Carabobo ===
- Primera División Venezuela: 2024, 2025
