= Gustavo Béliz =

Argentine politician

Gustavo Beliz
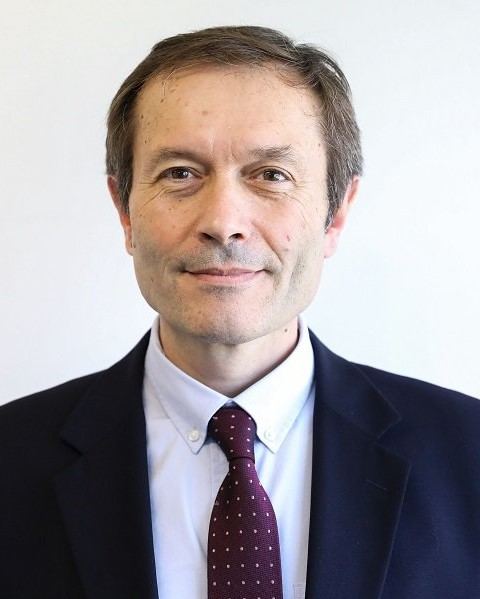

Secretary of Strategic Affairs
- In office 10 December 2019 – 29 August 2022
- President: Alberto Fernández
- Preceded by: Office established
- Succeeded by: Mercedes Marcó del Pont

Director of the Institute for the Integration of Latin America and the Caribbean
- In office 2 December 2014 – 1 October 2019
- Succeeded by: Pablo Marcelo García

Interamerican Development Bank (IADB), International Staff and Regional Coordinator, Citizen Security
- In office 2005–2014

Minister of Justice and Human Rights
- In office 25 May 2003 – 24 July 2004
- President: Néstor Kirchner
- Preceded by: Juan José Álvarez
- Succeeded by: Horacio Rosatti

Legislator of the City of Buenos Aires
- In office 10 December 1997 – 10 December 2000

Minister of the Interior
- In office 4 December 1992 – 1 August 1993
- President: Carlos Menem
- Preceded by: José Luis Manzano
- Succeeded by: Carlos Ruckauf

President of the Institute of National Administration
- In office 10 December 1989 – 4 December 1992

Personal details
- Born: January 7, 1962 (age 64) Buenos Aires, Argentina
- Party: Justicialist Party (1989–1995); New Leadership (1995–2004); Independent (2004–present)
- Other political affiliations: Front for Victory (2003–2004); Frente de Todos (2019–present)
- Profession: Lawyer

Gustavo Beliz (born 7 January 1962) is an Argentine politician and expert in global governance.

Beliz was born in Buenos Aires. He graduated at Law from University of Buenos Aires and then studied at London School of Economics.

He served during the presidency of Carlos Menem as minister of interior between 1992 and 1994, when he resigned over a disagreement with the president for the 1994 reform of the Argentine constitution and created his own party. He ran for mayor of Buenos Aires in 1996 and the next year was elected to the new City Council.

He was elected national senator representing Buenos Aires City but never took office in 2001. Later he was designated Minister of Justice during the presidency of Néstor Kirchner between 2003 and 2004. During his years at the Ministry of Justice, he promoted the impeachment of some members of the Supreme Court.

== Biography ==
=== Academic background ===
Beliz graduated from the School of Law at the University of Buenos Aires in 1989 and completed postgraduate studies at the London School of Economics in 1994, supported by a British Council scholarship to study globalization and state reform.

He was a professor at the School of Information Science at Universidad Austral between 1995 and 2001, and a professor at the Master's in Organizational Communications and an associate researcher at the Institute of Advanced Business Studies between 2000 and 2001. In 1987, he won a scholarship to Japan, as part of the cultural agreements signed by President Alfonsín and Prime Minister Nakasone. He was named one of the 10 Outstanding Young People of Argentina by the Junior Chamber of Buenos Aires in 1992. In 1999 Time magazine and CNN included him in their list of 50 Latin American Leaders for the Third Millennium.

=== Political career ===
Gustavo Beliz held several public offices during Carlos Menem’s presidency, including Minister of the Interior. He resigned in 1995 after opposing the 1994 constitutional reform and alleging corruption. In 1996, he founded the New Leadership Party and ran for Chief of Government of Buenos Aires, receiving 13.1% of the vote. He was elected to the Buenos Aires City Legislature in 1997 and later joined the Encounter for the City coalition in the 2000 city elections, which placed second.

In 2001, Beliz was elected to the Senate but was unable to take office due to a legal dispute. His party joined the winning Front for Victory coalition in 2003. In 2019, presidential candidate Alberto Fernández announced that Beliz would join his team, having previously worked with him during the Kirchner administration.

=== Minister of Justice, Citizen Security and Human Rights (2003-2004) ===
Following Kirchner's victory in the 2003 presidential elections, Beliz became Minister of Justice, Citizen Security, and Human Rights and launched a campaign to promote transparency within Argentina's federal judiciary. He advocated for the impeachment of members of the Supreme Court who were suspected of corruption and instituted the method of self-limitation in the appointment of judges by the Office of the President through a system of challenges and public hearings, which allowed for greater transparency and citizen participation. He resigned from office after a confrontation with Jaime Stiuso.

=== Career at The Interamerican Development Bank (2005-2019) ===
Between 2005 and 2013, he lived in Washington, DC, working at the Inter-American Development Bank. In 2013, he moved to Uruguay, to coordinate the Citizen Security regional cluster. Between 2014 and October 2019 he was director of the Institute for the Integration of Latin America and the Caribbean (INTAL) at the Inter-American Development Bank (IDB).

=== Secretary of Strategic Affairs for the President (since December 2019) ===
As Secretary of Strategic Affairs, he is a cabinet minister and is responsible for designing and implementing the foreign relations strategy for the Office of the President, working in partnership with Argentina's other ministries.

== Publications ==
- Argentina hacia el año 2000. Editorial Galerna, 1986.
- CGT, el otro poder. Editorial Sudamericana-Planeta, 1988.
- La Argentina ausente. Editorial Sudamericana, 1990.
- Vale la pena. Adiós a la vieja política. Editorial Sudamericana, 1993.
- Política social, la cuenta pendiente (compilador). Editorial Sudamericana, 1995.
- Buenos Aires vale la pena. Editorial Planeta, 1996.
- No Robarás ¿Es posible ganarle a la corrupción? (compilador). Editorial de Belgrano, 1997.
- Proyecto Ciudad. Fondo Editorial Nueva Dirigencia, 1999.
- La cultura profesional del periodismo argentino (coautor con Enrique Zuleta Puceiro). Universidad Austral, 1999.
- El otro modelo. Grupo Editor Latinoamericano, 2000.
- Robotlution, BID, 2017.
- Industry 4.0. Creating the future , BID 2018.
- Planet Algorithm, BID, 2018.
