= Ministry of Justice and Human Rights (Argentina) =

Government ministry of Argentina

Ministry of Justice
- Ministerio de Justicia
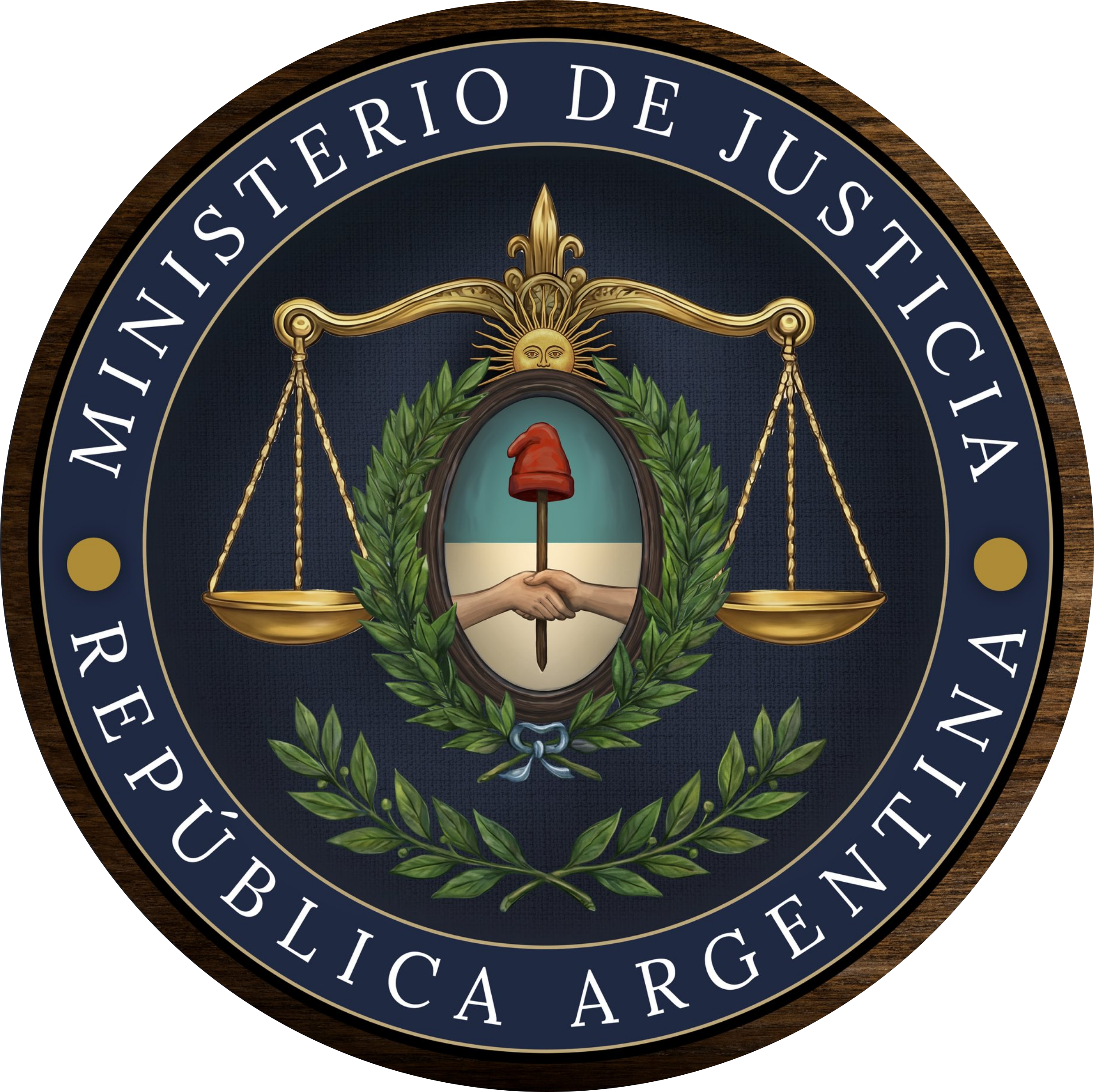

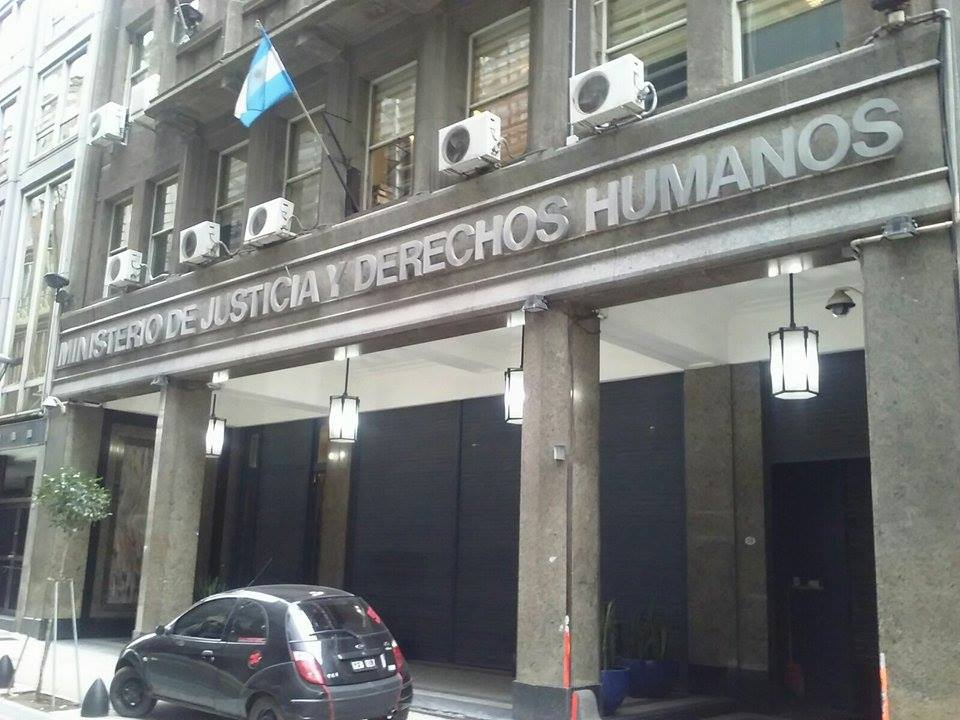
- Headquarters of the Ministry of Justice

Ministry overview
- Formed: 1949; 77 years ago
- Jurisdiction: Government of Argentina
- Headquarters: Sarmiento 329, Buenos Aires
- Annual budget: $ 32,087,882,671 (2021)
- Minister responsible: Juan Bautista Mahiques
- Website: argentina.gob.ar/justicia

The Ministry of Justice (Note: Before 10 December 2023, the official name was "Ministry of Justice and Human Rights".) (Spanish: Ministerio de Justicia; MJ) of Argentina is a ministry of the national executive power tasked with enforcing of the law and administration of justice.

The ministry was created in 1949, during the first presidency of Juan Domingo Perón, and has been consistently present in every presidential cabinet since then. The incumbent minister is Mariano Cúneo Libarona, who has served since 10 December 2023 in the cabinet of Javier Milei.

== Structure ==
The Ministry of Justice has a number of centralized dependencies reporting to it. The centralized dependencies, as in other government ministers, are known as secretariats (secretarías) and undersecretariats (subsecretarías); there are currently four of these:

  - Undersecretariat of Administrative Management (Subsecretaría de Gestión Administrativa)
- Secretariat of Justice (Secretaría de Justicia)
  - Undersecretariat of Penitentiary Affairs (Subsecretaría de Asuntos Penitenciarios)
  - Undersecretariat of Criminal Policy (Subsecretaría de Política Criminal)
  - Undersecretariat of Access to Justice (Subsecretaría de Acceso a la Justicia)
  - Undersecretariat of Relations with the Judiciary and Academia (Subsecretaría de Relaciones con el Poder Judicial y la Comunidad Académica)
- Secretariat of Human Rights (Secretaría de Derechos Humanos)
  - Undersecretariat of Protection and International Links on Human Rights (Subsecretaría de Protección y Enlace Internacional en Derechos Humanos)
  - Undersecretariat of the Promotion of Human Rights (Subsecretaría de Promoción de Derechos Humanos)
- General Secretariat of Justice and Human Rights (Secretaría General de Justicia y Derechos Humanos)

In addition, the National Institute Against Discrimination, Xenophobia and Racism (INADI), the Office of the General Notary of the Government of the Nation, the Procuratorship of the Treasure of the Nation, the Inspector General of Justice (Inspección General de Justicia, IGJ), the International Centre for the Promotion of Human Rights (CIPDH), the University Institute of the Mothers of Plaza de Mayo (IUNMA) and Argentina's federal prison system all depend on the Ministry of Justice.

== List of ministers ==
No.	Minister	Party	Term	Presidente
Ministry of Justice (1949–1954)
1	Belisario Gache Pirán	Peronist Party	11 March 1949 – 4 June 1952	Juan Domingo Perón
2	Natalio Carvajal Palacios	Peronist Party	4 June 1952 – 24 July 1954	Juan Domingo Perón
Ministry of the Interior and Justice (1954–1955)
3	Ángel Borlenghi	Peronist Party	24 July 1954 – 24 July 1955	Juan Domingo Perón
4	Oscar Albrieu	Peronist Party	24 July 1955 – 16 September 1955	Juan Domingo Perón
5	Eduardo Busso	Independent	23 September 1955 – 12 November 1955	Eduardo Lonardi
Ministry of Justice (1955–1956)
6	Julio Velar de Irigoyen	Independent	12 November 1955 – 13 November 1955	Eduardo Lonardi
7	Laureano Landaburu	Independent	13 November 1955 – 8 June 1956	Pedro Eugenio Aramburu
Ministry of Education and Justice (1956–1966)
8	Carlos Adrogué	Radical Civic Union	8 June 1956 – 25 January 1957	Pedro Eugenio Aramburu
9	Acdel Ernesto Salas	Independent	25 January 1957 – 1 May 1958	Pedro Eugenio Aramburu
10	Luis Rafael Mac Kay	Radical Civic Union	1 May 1958 – 26 March 1962	Arturo Frondizi
11	Miguel Sussini	Intransigent Radical Civic Union	26 March 1962 – 29 March 1962	Arturo Frondizi
11	Miguel Sussini	Intransigent Radical Civic Union	29 March 1962 – 19 October 1962	José María Guido
12	Alberto Rodríguez Galán	Independent	11 October 1962 – 15 May 1963	José María Guido
13	José Mariano Astigueta	Independent	15 May 1963 – 12 October 1963	José María Guido
14	Carlos Alconada Aramburú	Radical Civic Union	12 October 1963 – 28 June 1966	Arturo Illia
Ministry of Justice (1966–1983)
14	Carlos Alconada Aramburú	Radical Civic Union	28 June 1966 – 23 October 1969	Juan Carlos Onganía
15	Conrado Etchebarne	Independent	23 October 1969 – 8 June 1970	Juan Carlos Onganía
16	Jaime Perriaux	Independent	18 June 1970 – 22 March 1971	Roberto Levingston
16	Jaime Perriaux	Independent	22 March 1971 – 11 October 1971	Alejandro Lanusse
17	Ismael Bruno Quijano	Radical Civic Union	11 October 1971 – 11 July 1972	Alejandro Lanusse
18	Gervasio Colombres	Independent	11 July 1972 – 25 May 1973	Alejandro Lanusse
19	Antonio J. Benítez	Justicialist Party	25 May 1973 – 13 July 1973	Héctor José Cámpora
19	Antonio J. Benítez	Justicialist Party	13 July 1973 – 12 October 1973	Raúl Lastiri
19	Antonio J. Benítez	Justicialist Party	12 October 1973 – 1 July 1974	Juan Domingo Perón
19	Antonio J. Benítez	Justicialist Party	1 July 1974 – 10 June 1975	Isabel Perón
20	Ernesto Corvalán Nanclares	Justicialist Party	10 June 1975 – 14 January 1976	Isabel Perón
21	José Deheza	Justicialist Party	15 January 1976 – 12 March 1976	Isabel Perón
22	Augusto Pedro Saffores	Justicialist Party	12 March 1976 – 23 March 1976	Isabel Perón
23	Julio Arnaldo Gómez	Independent (Military)	29 March 1976 – 30 October 1978	Jorge Rafael Videla
24	Alberto Rodríguez Varela	Independent	5 November 1978 – 29 March 1981	Jorge Rafael Videla
25	Amadeo Frúgoli	Independent	29 March 1981 – 12 December 1981	Roberto Viola
26	Lucas Jaime Lennon	Independent	22 December 1981 – 18 June 1982	Leopoldo Galtieri
26	Lucas Jaime Lennon	Independent	18 June 1982 – 10 December 1983	Reynaldo Bignone
Ministry of Education and Justice (1983–1989)
27	Carlos Alconada Aramburú	Radical Civic Union	10 December 1983 – 21 June 1986	Raúl Alfonsín
28	Julio Rajneri	Independent	21 June 1986 – 10 September 1987	Raúl Alfonsín
29	Jorge Federico Sabato	Radical Civic Union	10 September 1987 – 26 May 1989	Raúl Alfonsín
30	José Gabriel Dumón	Radical Civic Union	26 May 1989 – 8 July 1989	Raúl Alfonsín
Ministry of Justice, Security and Human Rights (1989–1999)
31	León Arslanián	Independent	8 July 1989 – 16 January 1992	Carlos Menem
32	Jorge Luis Maiorano	Justicialist Party	16 January 1992 – 16 June 1994	Carlos Menem
33	Rodolfo Barra	Justicialist Party	16 June 1994 – 10 July 1996	Carlos Menem
34	Elías Jassán	Independent	10 July 1996 – 25 June 1997	Carlos Menem
35	Raúl Granillo Ocampo	Justicialist Party	25 June 1997 – 10 December 1999	Carlos Menem
Ministry of Justice and Human Rights (1999–2001)
36	Ricardo Gil Lavedra	Radical Civic Union	10 December 1999 – 6 October 2000	Fernando de la Rúa
37	Jorge de la Rúa	Radical Civic Union	6 October 2000 – 21 December 2001	Fernando de la Rúa
Ministry of Justice, Security and Human Rights (2002–2010)
39	Jorge Vanossi	Radical Civic Union	3 January 2002 – 3 July 2002	Eduardo Duhalde
40	Juan José Álvarez	Justicialist Party	10 July 2002 – 25 May 2003	Eduardo Duhalde
41	Gustavo Béliz	New Leadership	25 May 2003 – 25 July 2004	Néstor Kirchner
42	Horacio Rosatti	Justicialist Party	25 July 2004 – 26 July 2005	Néstor Kirchner
43	Alberto Iribarne	Justicialist Party	26 July 2005 – 10 December 2007	Néstor Kirchner
44	Aníbal Fernández	Justicialist Party	10 December 2007 – 8 July 2009	Cristina Fernández de Kirchner
45	Julio Alak	Justicialist Party	8 July 2009 – 10 December 2010	Cristina Fernández de Kirchner
Ministry of Justice and Human Rights (2010–2023)
45	Julio Alak	Justicialist Party	10 December 2010 – 10 December 2015	Cristina Fernández de Kirchner
46	Germán Garavano	Independent	10 December 2015 – 10 December 2019	Mauricio Macri
47	Marcela Losardo	Independent	10 December 2019 – 18 March 2021	Alberto Fernández
48	Martín Soria	Justicialist Party	29 March 2021 – 10 December 2023	Alberto Fernández
Ministry of Justice (2023-Present)
49	Mariano Cúneo Libarona	Independent	10 December 2023 – 4 March 2026	Javier Milei
50	Juan Bautista Mahiques	Independent	8 March 2026 – Present	Javier Milei

== See also ==
- Justice ministry
- Judiciary of Argentina
