= Julio Alak =

Argentine politician

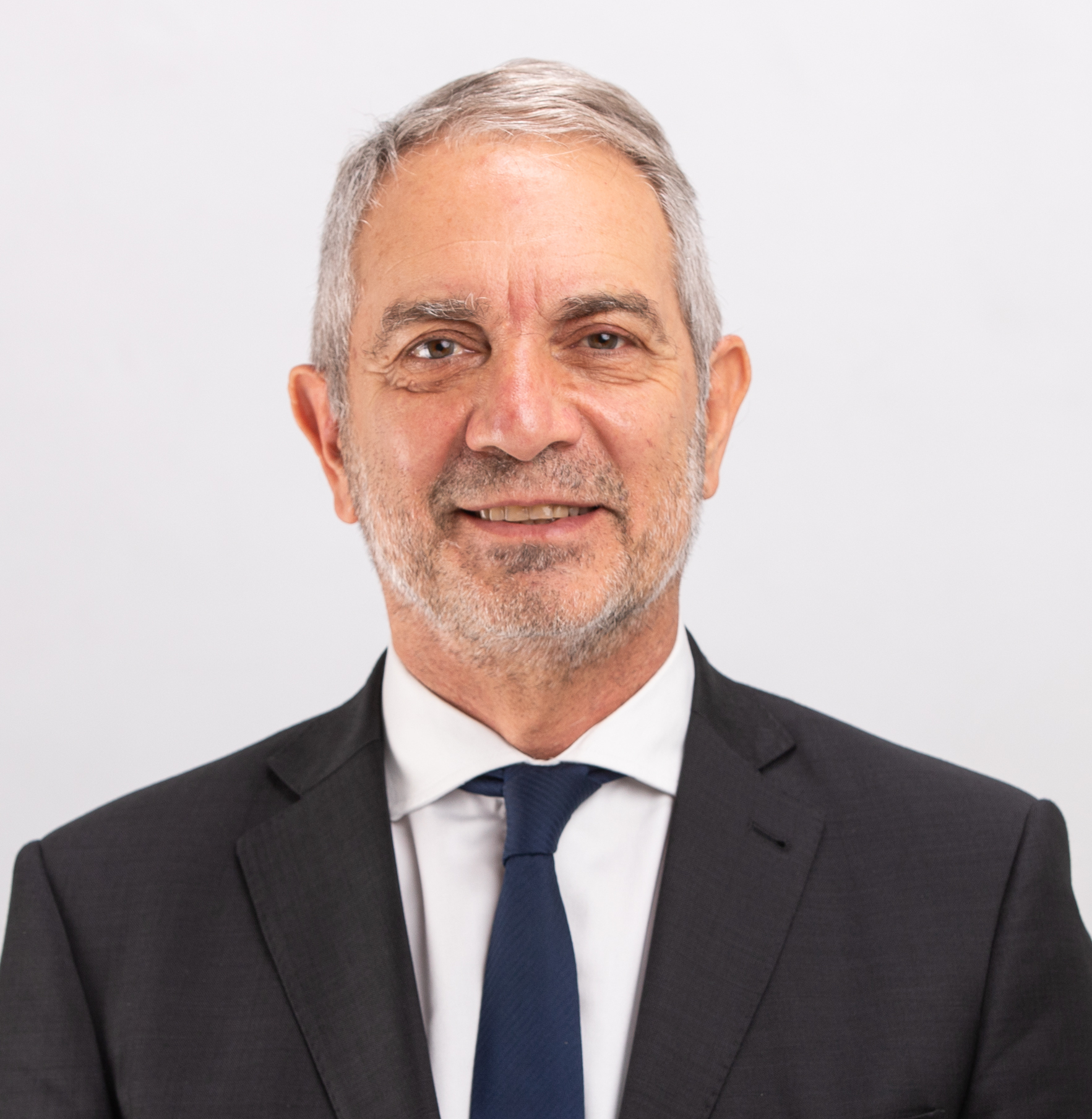
- Alak in 2021

Mayor of La Plata
- Incumbent
- Assumed office 10 December 2023
- Preceded by: Julio Garro
- In office 10 December 1991 – 10 December 2007
- Preceded by: Pablo Pinto
- Succeeded by: Pablo Bruera

Minister of Justice and Human Rights of Buenos Aires Province
- In office 11 December 2019 – 10 December 2023
- Governor: Axel Kicillof
- Preceded by: Gustavo Ferrari
- Succeeded by: Juan Martín Mena

Minister of Justice and Human Rights
- In office 8 July 2009 – 10 December 2015
- President: Cristina Fernández de Kirchner
- Preceded by: Aníbal Fernández
- Succeeded by: Germán Garavano

Personal details
- Born: 9 January 1958 (age 68) Benito Juárez, Buenos Aires Province, Argentina
- Party: Justicialist Party
- Spouse: Marita Scarpino
- Education: National University of La Plata

Julio César Alak (born 9 January 1958) is an Argentine politician. Since 10 December 2023, intendente (mayor) of La Plata, the capital city of Buenos Aires Province. He previously held the post from 1991 to 2007.

A lawyer by profession, he served as Minister of Justice and Human Rights of Argentina from 2009 to 2015, under the presidency of Cristina Fernández de Kirchner, and has served as Minister of Justice and Human Rights of Buenos Aires Province under Governor Axel Kicillof from 2019 to 2023.

== Early life and career ==
Alak was born to a family of Spanish, Italian and Armenian descent in Benito Juárez, a pampas town in Buenos Aires Province. He worked as a journalist while studying law at the University of La Plata, and joined Chacho Álvarez and other center-left Peronists supporting Antonio Cafiero in the APU. Alak taught Public Law at the university and established a private practice. He married Marita Scarpino and had three children. Alak joined the Justicialist Party in 1984.

== Political career ==
Alak became the President of the La Plata branch of the party in 1988, and was nominated its mayoral candidate in 1991. He won the election, narrowly defeating the incumbent UCR mayor, and held the post until the 2007 election.

=== Tenure as mayor and stadium controversy ===
In the 1990s, Alak pushed through the construction of a new stadium for La Plata, over the objections of the two major football clubs, which chose to remain in their home fields.

Concurrently, Alak sponsored a minor club, La Plata FC, which some claimed was part of an Alak patronage scheme. Significant sums were allegedly spent from the city budget for activities related to that club, which has virtually no following. For some time, it was thought that it would be the only side to play in the new stadium, which was used mainly for concerts.

When a security regulation forbidding wooden stands came into effect in 2005, Estudiantes de La Plata relocated their home games to the Bosque (the field of rival side Gimnasia y Esgrima La Plata), and later to the Quilmes stadium. The municipality has refused to allow Estudiantes an upgrade of their field, and ignored a court order that allowed its operation until a better solution was found. This behavior triggered animosity in the Estudiantes fan base.

In 2006, Gimnasia's stadium was banned as well, and their management transferred their games to the new stadium, over fans' objections. In April 2006, Alak intervened against a judicial order that would have allowed the re-opening of both fields. In August 2006, an agreement was reached to allow remodeling Estudiantes' field, using newer technologies, to allow for a 20,000 sitting room capacity.

Critics argue that while millions went into the construction of the stadium, which the city did not need, thousands of poor people live in its shadows without receiving proper municipal services.

When Estudiantes obtained the 2006 Apertura title, Alak invited the team to an official ceremony but the players declined to attend, claiming that the pressure from the crowd would not allow them to reach his office; actually, the players were at the Cathedral, 200 m (650 ft) from City Hall, and so the refusal to attend was perceived as a rebuke of Alak.

Prior to the 2007 provincial election, Alak signed Estudiantes legend Juan Ramón Verón to a post as children sports services coordinator. Estudiantes fans puzzled over the designation, which is perceived as cementing Alak's alignment with candidate Daniel Scioli and an attempt to heal the rift between Estudiantes and Alak's administration.

La Plata FC was dissolved only three months after Alak left office.

=== National government career ===
Initial results of the 28 October 2007 election indicated that Alak finished behind opposition candidate Pablo Bruera who took 25% to Alak's 20%. Sensing defeat, Alak's campaign operators attempted to suggest a link between Bruera and the killing of three policemen in La Plata, which took place nine days before the election; all investigations were inconclusive as of voting day, however (three suspects were detained and subsequently released).

Alak was named to the Board of Directors of Aerolíneas Argentinas, on 14 February 2008, as the Argentine Government's representative on the air carrier's board, and served as its CEO following the air carrier's July 2008 nationalization.

Following the ruling Front for Victory's defeat in the 2009 mid-term elections, Alak was tapped to replace Attorney General Aníbal Fernández, who had been appointed the President's Cabinet Chief, effective 8 July.

Justice Minister Alak spearheaded more vigorous laws against terrorism, money laundering, and market manipulation during his tenure, as well as stepped up prosecutions of Dirty War perpetrators.

=== Return to La Plata ===
Ahead of the 2023 local elections, Alak was nominated by the newly formed Unión por la Patria coalition to be the mayoral candidate in La Plata. On 22 October 2023, he won the election against incumbent Julio Garro, of the PRO party, in a highly contested election. After initial provisional results showed a lead of under 1,000 votes for Alak, Garro asked the Electoral Tribunal for a vote recount. The tribunal finally declared Alak the winner on 3 November 2023, with a lead of 606 votes.
