= Council of Magistracy of the Nation =

Judicial council in Argentina

The Council of Magistracy of the Nation (Spanish: Consejo de la Magistratura de la Nación) is an organ of the Judicial Branch of the Government of Argentina. It is in charge of appointing judges, of presenting charges against them to an Accusation Jury, and of suspending or deposing them.

The council was created by Law 25669 of the Argentine National Congress in 2002, and it originally had 20 members:

- The president of the Supreme Court of Justice.
- Four national judges, elected through the D'Hondt method.
- Eight legislators: four Deputies and four Senators, in each case corresponding two for the majority party, one for the first minority and one for the second minority.
- Four lawyers with a federal license, elected by other federal lawyers.
- One representative of the Executive Branch.
- Two representatives of the scientific and academic fields, elected by their peers.

In 2006 the council was reformed, with a reduction in the number of members from 20 to 13: six legislators, three judges, two lawyers, one academic and the representative of the Executive Branch (and no representative of the Supreme Court). The reform met considerable opposition, since the reduction turned the Council into a more politically partisan body, and at the time left it with a total of five members of the Justicialist Party (the majority in both Houses of Congress, with four members in the council, plus the representative of the Executive).
