= Universidad del Museo Social Argentino =

University in Buenos Aires, Argentina

University of Argentine Social Museum (UMSA)
- Universidad del Museo Social Argentino
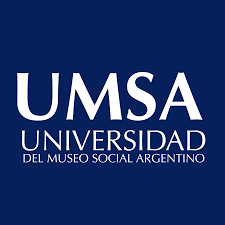
- Established: 1956; 70 years ago
- Rector: Dr. Guillermo E. Garbarini Islas
- Location: Buenos Aires, Argentina; 34°36′15″S 58°23′29″W
- Campus: Urban
- Colors
- Website: www.umsa.edu.ar/acerca-de-umsa

The University of Argentine Social Museum (Spanish: Universidad del Museo Social Argentino, UMSA) is a university in Argentina. It was founded on November 5, 1956, in the city of Buenos Aires and consists of five departments:

- Facultad de Ciencias Jurídicas y Sociales (law)
- Facultad de Ciencias Humanas (social sciences)
- Facultad de Artes (Art)
- Facultad de Lenguas Modernas (modern language)
- Facultad de Ciencias Económicas (economics)

== See also ==
- Argentine university reform of 1918
- List of Argentine universities
- Science and technology in Argentina
