= Presidency of Alberto Fernández =

Argentine presidency from 2019 to 2023

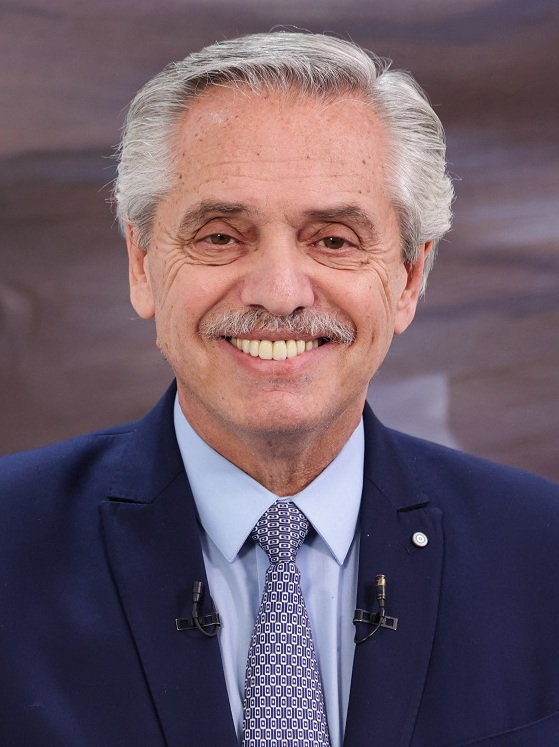
- Presidency of Alberto Fernández; 10 December 2019 – 10 December 2023
- President: Alberto Fernández
- Vice President: Cristina Fernández de Kirchner
- Party: Justicialist Party (PJ); Frente de Todos
- Election: 2019
- Seat: Casa Rosada; Quinta de Olivos
- Standard of the President

Alberto Fernández's tenure as President of Argentina began on 10 December 2019, when Fernández was inaugurated, and ended on 10 December 2023. He took office alongside vice president Cristina Fernández de Kirchner following the Frente de Todos coalition's victory in the 2019 general election, with 48.24% of the vote against incumbent president Mauricio Macri's 40.28%. Fernández's victory represented the first time in Argentina's history that an incumbent president had been defeated in a re-election bid. In 2023, he was later succeeded by Javier Milei.

== 2019 election ==
On 18 May 2019, Cristina Fernández de Kirchner announced that Fernández would be a candidate for president and that she would run for vice president alongside him, hosting his first campaign rally with Santa Cruz Governor Alicia Kirchner, sister-in-law of the former Kirchner.

About a month later, seeking to broaden his appeal to moderates, Fernández struck a deal with Sergio Massa to form an alliance called Frente de Todos, wherein Massa would be offered a role within a potential Fernández administration, or be given a key role within the Chamber of Deputies in exchange for dropping out of the presidential race and offering his support. Fernández also earned the endorsement of the General Confederation of Labour, receiving their support in exchange for promising that he will boost the economy and that there would be no labor reforms.

=== Inauguration ===
Fernández took office on 10 December 2019. The ceremony took place, as it is constitutionally mandated, in the palace of the National Congress of Argentina. He was accompanied by his domestic partner, Fabiola Yáñez, and his only child, Tani Fernández. At midday, Fernández was sworn in alongside Vice President-elect Cristina Fernández de Kirchner, in the presence of Macri, Vice President (and president of the Senate) Gabriela Michetti, the General Assembly (the congregation of both houses of Congress), and domestic and international dignitaries.

== Cabinet ==
Fernández's cabinet took office on the same day he was sworn in as president, on 10 December 2019. The cabinet is formed by members of the Frente de Todos, a peronist coalition formed ahead of the 2019 general election, as well as independents. Reflecting the composition of the Frente de Todos, it was made up of members belonging to different branches of the Justicialist Party, members of the Renewal Front, and independents.

The first change in the cabinet took place in November 2020, when María Eugenia Bielsa was replaced by Jorge Ferraresi as Minister of Habitat. Ginés González García, Minister of Health, was sacked in February 2021 and replaced by vice-minister Carla Vizzotti following a scandal regarding preferential treatment in the COVID-19 vaccination campaign. The Justice Minister, Marcela Losardo, resigned in March 2021 for personal reasons and was replaced by congressman Martín Soria.

Ahead of the 2021 legislative elections, the ministers of defense (Agustín Rossi) and social development (Daniel Arroyo) announced their candidacies for legislative positions; they were replaced by Jorge Taiana and Juan Zabaleta, respectively, in August 2021. Following the governing coalition's poor showings in the September 2021 primary elections, President Fernández organised a cabinet reshuffle that resulted in changes in the portfolios of foreign affairs, security, agriculture, education, science and technology, and the Cabinet Chief's Office.

=== Ministers ===
Ministry	Minister	Party	Start	End
Cabinet Chief	Santiago Cafiero	Justicialist Party	10 December 2019	20 September 2021
Cabinet Chief	Juan Luis Manzur	Justicialist Party	20 September 2021	15 February 2023
Cabinet Chief	Agustín Rossi	Justicialist Party	15 February 2023	10 December 2023
Minister of the Interior	Eduardo de Pedro	Justicialist Party	10 December 2019	10 December 2023
Minister of Foreign Affairs, International Trade and Worship	Felipe Solá	Justicialist Party	10 December 2019	20 September 2021
Minister of Foreign Affairs, International Trade and Worship	Santiago Cafiero	Justicialist Party	20 September 2021	10 December 2023
Minister of Defense	Agustín Rossi	Justicialist Party	10 December 2019	10 August 2021
Minister of Defense	Jorge Taiana	Justicialist Party	10 August 2021	10 December 2023
Minister of Economy	Martín Guzmán	Independent	10 December 2019	2 July 2022
Minister of Economy	Silvina Batakis	Justicialist Party	4 July 2022	3 August 2022
Minister of Economy	Sergio Massa	Renewal Front	3 August 2022	10 December 2023
Minister of Productive Development (Note: Until 3 August 2022, when it was reorganised as the Secretariat of Productive Development, within the scope of the Ministry of Economy.)	Matías Kulfas	Independent	10 December 2019	4 June 2022
Minister of Productive Development	Daniel Scioli	Justicialist Party	15 June 2022	3 August 2022
Minister of Tourism and Sports	Matías Lammens	Broad Front	10 December 2019	10 December 2023
Minister of Public Works	Gabriel Katopodis	Justicialist Party	10 December 2019	10 December 2023
Minister of Justice and Human Rights	Marcela Losardo	Independent	10 December 2019	29 March 2021
Minister of Justice and Human Rights	Martín Soria	Justicialist Party	29 March 2021	10 December 2023
Minister of Labour, Employment and Social Security	Claudio Moroni	Justicialist Party	10 December 2019	13 October 2022
Minister of Labour, Employment and Social Security	Kelly Olmos	Justicialist Party	13 October 2022	10 December 2023
Minister of Health	Ginés González García	Justicialist Party	10 December 2019	20 February 2021
Minister of Health	Carla Vizzotti	Independent	29 March 2021	10 December 2023
Minister of Social Development	Daniel Arroyo	Renewal Front	10 December 2019	10 August 2021
Minister of Social Development	Juan Zabaleta	Justicialist Party	10 August 2021	13 October 2022
Minister of Social Development	Victoria Tolosa Paz	Justicialist Party	13 October 2022	10 December 2023
Minister of Education	Nicolás Trotta	Independent	10 December 2019	20 September 2021
Minister of Education	Jaime Perczyk	Independent	20 September 2021	10 December 2023
Minister of Science, Technology and Innovation	Roberto Salvarezza	Independent	10 December 2019	20 September 2021
Minister of Science, Technology and Innovation	Daniel Filmus	Justicialist Party	20 September 2021	10 December 2023
Minister of Agriculture, Livestock, and Fisheries (Note: Until 3 August 2022, when it was reorganised as the Secretariat of Agriculture, Livestock and Fisheries, within the scope of the Ministry of Economy.)	Luis Basterra	Justicialist Party	10 December 2019	20 September 2021
Minister of Agriculture, Livestock, and Fisheries	Julián Domínguez	Justicialist Party	20 September 2021	3 August 2022
Minister of Security	Sabina Frederic	Independent	10 December 2019	20 September 2021
Minister of Security	Aníbal Fernández	Justicialist Party	20 September 2021	10 December 2023
Minister of Culture	Tristán Bauer	Independent	10 December 2019	10 December 2023
Minister of Women, Genders and Diversity	Elizabeth Gómez Alcorta	Patria Grande Front	10 December 2019	7 October 2022
Minister of Women, Genders and Diversity	Ayelén Mazzina	Justicialist Party	13 October 2022	10 December 2023
Minister of Transport	Mario Meoni	Renewal Front	10 December 2019	23 April 2021
Minister of Transport	Alexis Guerrera	Renewal Front	3 May 2021	29 November 2022
Minister of Transport	Diego Giuliano	Renewal Front	29 November 2022	10 December 2023
Minister of Territorial Development and Habitat	María Eugenia Bielsa	Justicialist Party	10 December 2019	11 November 2020
Minister of Territorial Development and Habitat	Jorge Ferraresi	Justicialist Party	11 November 2020	1 November 2022
Minister of Territorial Development and Habitat	Santiago Maggiotti	Justicialist Party	1 November 2022	10 December 2023
Minister of the Environment and Sustainable Development	Juan Cabandié	Justicialist Party	10 December 2019	10 December 2023

=== Presidential secretariats ===
Ministry	Minister	Party	Start	End
General Secretary	Julio Vitobello	Justicialist Party	10 December 2019	10 December 2023
Legal and Technical Secretary	Vilma Ibarra	Independent	10 December 2019	10 December 2023
Secretary of Strategic Affairs	Gustavo Béliz	Independent	10 December 2019	29 July 2022
Secretary of Strategic Affairs	Mercedes Marcó del Pont	MID	1 August 2022	10 December 2023
Secretary of Communications and Press	Juan Pablo Biondi	Justicialist Party	10 December 2019	20 September 2021
Secretary of Communications and Press	Juan Ross	Independent	20 September 2021	10 December 2023

== Domestic affairs ==
=== Economic policy ===
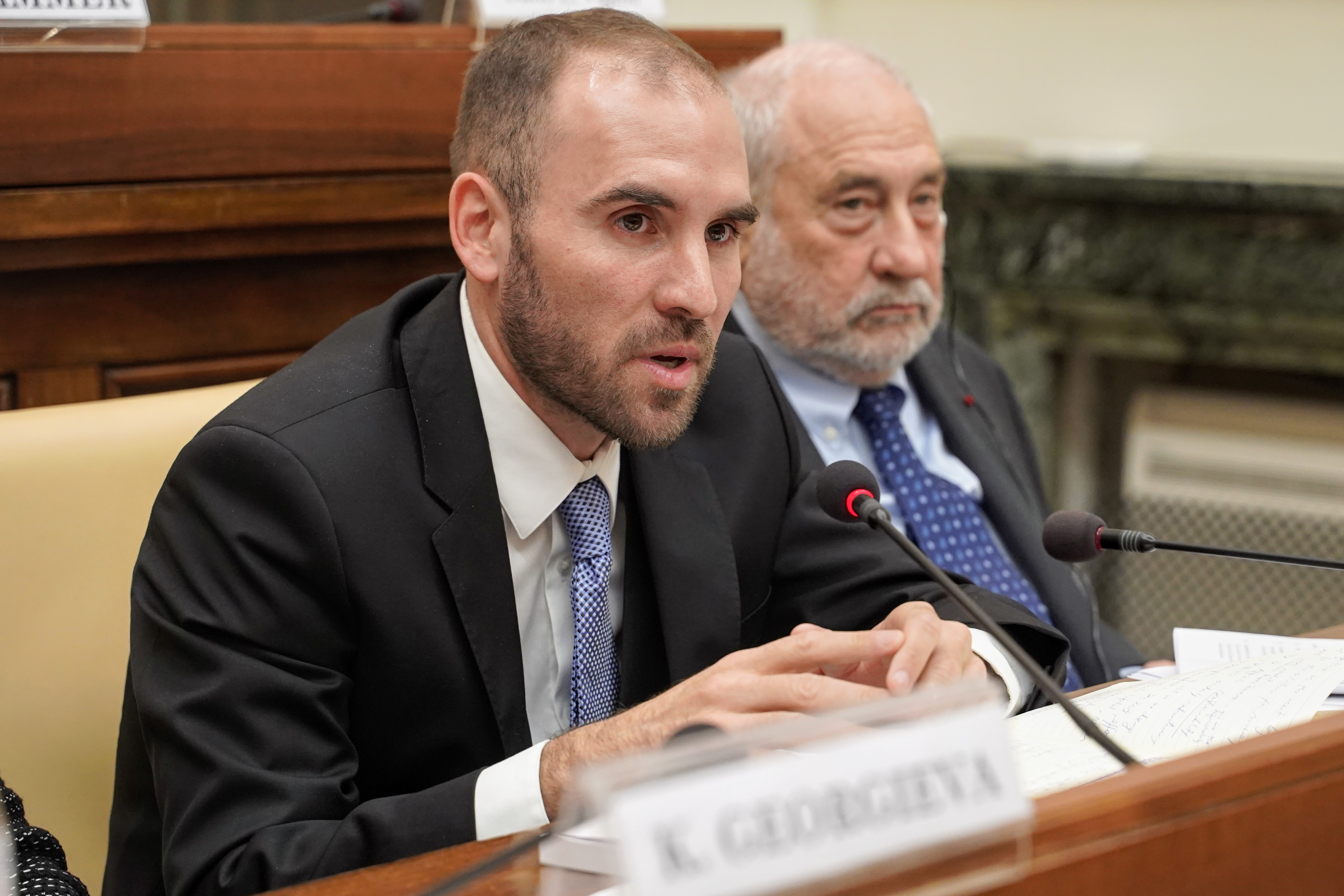
Martín Guzmán, an economist specialised on sovereign debt and macroeconomics, was appointed by Fernández as minister of economy.

On 14 December 2019, the government established by decree the emergency in occupational matters and double compensation for dismissal without just cause for six months.

Fernández's first legislative initiative, the Social Solidarity and Productive Recovery Bill, was passed by Congress on 23 December 2019. The bill includes tax hikes on foreign currency purchases, agricultural exports, wealth, and car sales - as well as tax incentives for production. Amid the worst recession in nearly two decades, it provides a 180-day freeze on utility rates, bonuses for the nation's retirees and Universal Allocation per Child beneficiaries, and food cards to two million of Argentina's poorest families. It also gave the president additional powers to renegotiate debt terms – with Argentina seeking to restructure its US$100 billion debt with private bondholders and US$45 billion borrowed by Macri from the International Monetary Fund. As the capital controls stayed in effect and with no prospect of being removed, the MCSI degraded the country from emerging market to standalone market.

Organisations of the agricultural sector, including Sociedad Rural Argentina, CONINAGRO, Argentine Agrarian Federation and Argentine Rural Confederations, rejected the increase in taxes on agricultural exports. Despite these conflicts, Fernández announced the three-point increase in withholding tax on soybeans on the day of the opening of the regular sessions, on 1 March and generated major problems in the relationship between the government and the agricultural sector.

At the onset of the COVID-19 crisis, the IMF reported that Argentina's GDP would plunge by 9.9 percent, after the country's economy contracted by 5.4 percent in first quarter of 2020, with unemployment rising over 10.4 percent in the first three months of the year, before the lockdown started. On September 22, as part of the economic impact of the COVID-19 pandemic, official reports showed a 19% year-on-year drop in the GDP for the second quarter of 2020, the biggest drop in the country's history. Investment went down 38% from the previous year. The poverty rate rose to 42% in the second half of 2020, the highest since 2004. Child poverty reaches the 57.7% of minors of 14 years.

==== Debt restructuring and agreement with the IMF ====
In 2018, under the Mauricio Macri administration, Argentina received the International Monetary Fund (IMF)'s biggest loan to date: $57 billion US$ were initially greenlit by the international organisation. Following Macri's defeat in the 2019 election, Fernández's economy minister, Martín Guzmán, announced the incoming administration would not request the final installment of the IMF's loan, accounting for $11 billion.

Argentina defaulted again on 22 May 2020 by failing to pay $500 million on its due date to its creditors. Negotiations for the restructuring of $66 billion of its debt continued after that. On 4 August, Fernández reached an accord with the biggest creditors on terms for a restructuring of $65bn in foreign bonds, after a breakthrough in talks that had at times looked close to collapse since the country's ninth debt default in May.

In 2021, the International Monetary Fund concluded the 2018 loan granted to Macri's administration "had not delivered on its objectives". The Fernández administration has maintained its criticism of the deal, with Guzmán calling it "an absurd loan".

On 28 January 2022, the Fernández administration struck an agreement in principle with the International Monetary Fund over a new $44.5 billion standby deal. The deal, which requires congressional approval in order to take effect, caused unease within the governing coalition. Máximo Kirchner, president of the Frente de Todos parliamentary bloc in the Chamber of Deputies and leader of La Cámpora, one of the coalition's largest partners, resigned from his position on 1 February 2022 over disagreements with the IMF deal.

=== COVID-19 pandemic ===
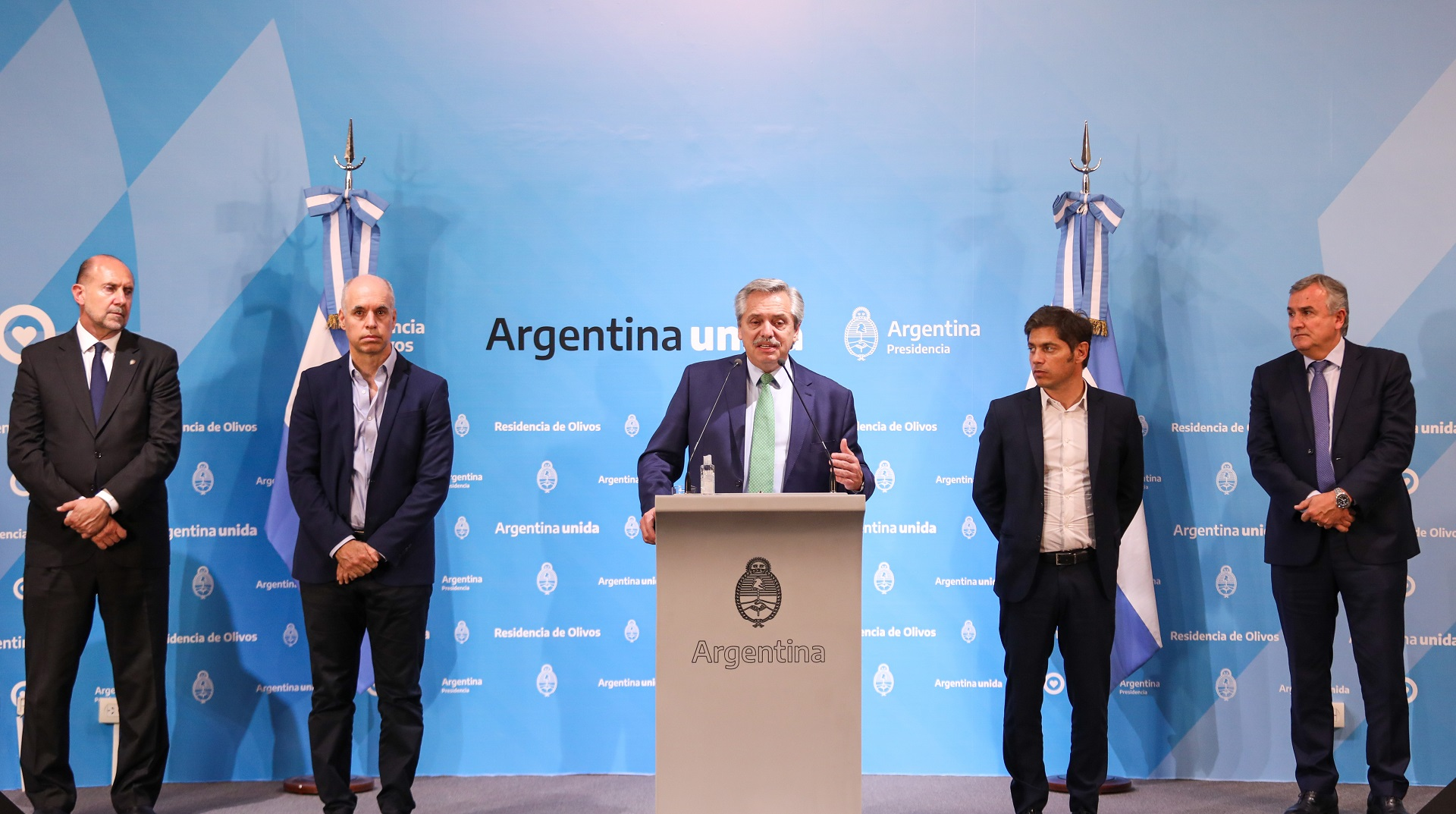
The announcement of the lockdown by Fernández was generally well received, although there were concerns with its economic impact

At the start of the COVID-19 pandemic, the Fernández administration announced a country-wide lockdown, in effect from 20 March until 31 March, later extended until 12 April. The lockdown was further renewed on 27 April, 11 May, 25 May, 8 June, 1 July, 18 July, 3 August, 17 August, 31 August, and 21 September, and included several measures including travel, transport and citizen movement restrictions, stay-at-home orders, store closures and reduced operating hours.

Responses to the outbreak have included restrictions on commerce and movement, closure of borders, and the closure of schools and educational institutions. The announcement of the lockdown was generally well received, although there were concerns with its economic impact in the already delicate state of Argentina's economy, with analysts predicting at least 3% GDP decrease in 2020. Fernandez later announced a 700 billion pesos (US$11.1 billion) stimulus package, worth 2% of the country's GDP. After announced a mandatory quarantine to every person that returned to Argentina from highly affected countries, the government closed its borders, ports, and suspended flights.

On 23 March, Fernández asked the Chinese president Xi Jinping for 1,500 ventilators as Argentina had only 8,890 available.

Despite the government's hard lockdown policy, Fernández was criticised for not following the appropriate protocols himself. This included traveling throughout the country, taking pictures with large groups of supporters without properly wearing a mask nor respecting social distancing, and holding social gatherings with union leaders.

On 3 September 2020, despite most local governments still enforcing strict lockdown measures, Fernández stated that "there is no lockdown", and that such thoughts had "been instilled by the opposition", as part of a political agenda. Fernández eased some lockdown measures in the Greater Buenos Aires on 6 November 2020, shifting to a "social distancing" phase.

==== Economic impact ====
Due to the national lockdown, economic activity suffered a collapse of nearly 10% in March 2020 according to a consultant firm. The highest drop was in the construction sector (32%) versus March 2019. Every economic sector suffered a collapse, with finance, commerce, manufacturing industry, and mining being the most affected. The agriculture sector was the least affected, but overall the economic activity for the first trimester of 2020 accumulated a 5% contraction. It is expected that the extension of the lockdown beyond April would increase the collapse of the Argentinian economy. On March, the primary fiscal deficit jumped to US$1,394 million, an 857% increase year-to-year. This was due to the public spending to combat the pandemic and the drop in tax collection due to low activity in the context of social isolation. Schools were closed for over a year, and it is estimated that 1.5 million of kids abandoned school, a 13% of the total.

Because banks were excluded in the list of businesses that were considered essential in the lockdown decree, they remained closed until the Central Bank announced banks would open during a weekend starting on 3 April. Due to Argentina's notoriously low level of banking penetration, many Argentines, particularly retirees, do not possess bank accounts and are used to withdraw funds and pensions in cash. The decision to open banks for only three days on a reduced-hours basis sparked widespread outrage as hundreds of thousands of retirees (coronavirus' highest risk group) flocked to bank branches in order to withdraw their monthly pension and emergency payment.

==== Vaccination campaign ====
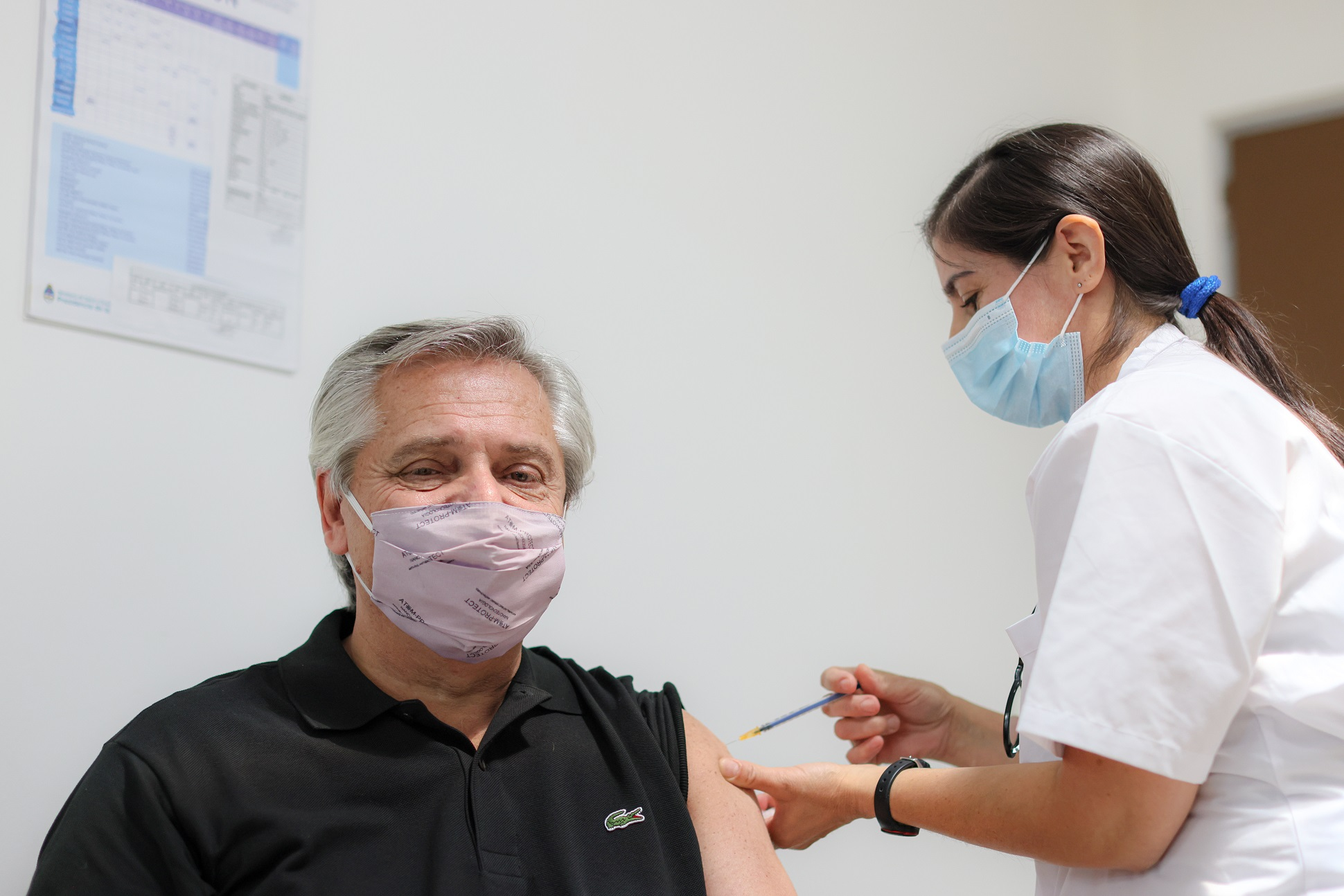
Fernández receiving the first dose of the Sputnik V vaccine against COVID-19 on 21 January 2021

On 21 January 2021, Fernández became the first Latin American leader to be inoculated against the disease via the recently approved Gam-COVID-Vac (better known as Sputnik V). On 7 December 2021, Fernández received his booster dose of the vaccine.

Ginés González García was forced to resign as Health Minister on 19 February 2021 after it was revealed he provided preferential treatment for the COVID-19 vaccine to his close friends, including journalist Horacio Verbitsky and other political figures. He was succeeded by the second in charge Carla Vizzotti. The revelation was met with wide national condemnation from supporters and opposition, as Argentina had at the time received only 1,5 million doses of vaccine for its population of 40 million.

Fernández tested positive for COVID-19 on 2 April 2021 having a "light fever".

By January 2022, 86.2% of the country's population had received at least one dose of the COVID-19 vaccine, while 74.5% had received the respective two doses of the vaccine. Booster shots started being given to vulnerable populations in October 2021.

=== Social policy ===
In September 2019, during the Mauricio Macri administration, the Argentine Congress declared a "National Hunger Emergency". As one of his initial measures as president, Fernández launched the Plan Argentina contra el Hambre ("Argentina against Hunger Plan"). As part of the plan, the Social Development Ministry began issuing Tarjeta Alimentar cards, debit cards assigned 4,000 pesos per month (later adjusted to 6,000 pesos) to beneficiaries of the existing Universal allocation per child (AUH) programme to be used in food items. In addition, the programme implemented price caps for essential food items ("Precios Cuidados") and value-added tax returns for low-income households.

At the onset of the economic crisis caused by the COVID-19 pandemic and the subsequent lockdown measures, the Fernández administration launched two complimentary social assistance schemes: the Ingreso Familiar de Emergencia ("Emergency Family Income", IFE) and the Asistencia de Emergencia al Trabajo y la Producción ("Emergency Labour and Production Assistance", ATP). The IFE programme granted 10,000 monthly pesos to informal sector workers and self-employed workers whose income was affected by the lockdown. In total, over 8 million people across the country during two months, and later continued to be issued for people living in urban centres where lockdown measures continued in place throughout 2020. On the other hand, the ATP programme granted half of the salaries of workers (active or otherwise) for a number of businesses. Lastly, the government forbid all terminations and unilateral suspensions of labour contracts for 120 days, later extending the measure to cover all of 2020 and 2021.

=== Social issues ===
Following his victory in the 2019 elections, Fernández announced his cabinet would include, for the first time in Argentina's history, a ministry dedicated entirely to deal with women's affairs. Elizabeth Gómez Alcorta was appointed as the first Minister of Women, Genders and Diversity on 10 December 2019. Prior to the establishment of the Ministry, women's affairs were dealt by the National Institute for Women.

==== Abortion ====
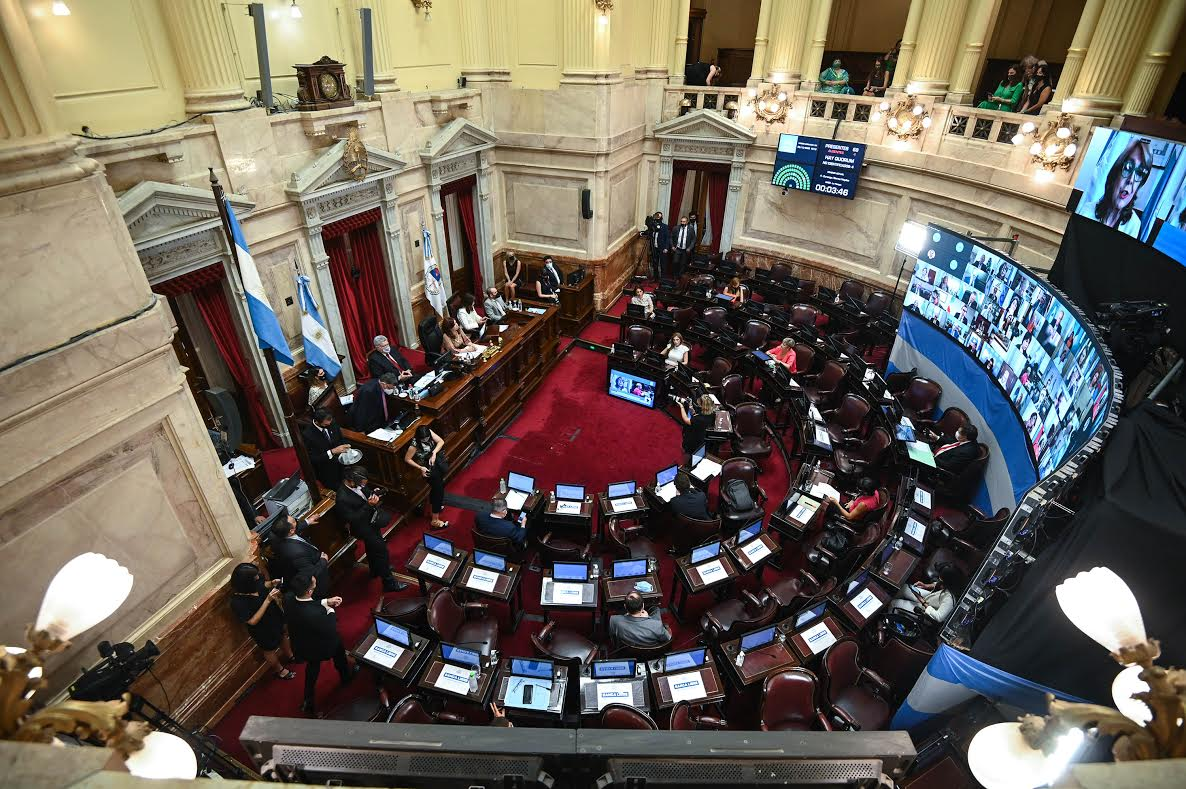
The Argentine Senate on 30 December 2020, debating the Voluntary Interruption of Pregnancy Bill (IVE), which legalised abortion in Argentina. The IVE bill counted with Fernández's support and formed part of his 2020 parliamentary agenda

On 31 December 2019, Fernández announced that he would send a bill in 2020 to discuss the legalisation of abortion, ratified his support for its approval, and expressed his wish for "sensible debate". However, in June 2020, he stated that he was "attending to more urgent matters" (referring to the COVID-19 pandemic, as well as the debt restructuring), and that "he'll send the bill at some point". In November 2020, Fernández's legal secretary, Vilma Ibarra, confirmed that the government would be sending a new bill for the legalisation of abortion to the National Congress that month. The Executive sent the bill, alongside another bill oriented towards women's health care (the "1000 Days Plan"), on 17 November 2020. The bill was passed by the Senate on 30 December 2020, and received presidential assent on 14 January 2021, effectively legalising abortion in Argentina.

==== LGBT rights ====
In January 2020, trans rights activist Alba Rueda was appointed Undersecretary of Diversity Policies (Spanish: "Políticas de Diversidad") within the new Ministry of Women, Genders and Diversity, becoming the first transgender person to be appointed to a senior government post in Argentina.

On 4 September 2020, Fernández signed Decreto 721/2020, which established a 1% employment quota for trans and travesti people in the national public sector. The measure had been previously debated in the Chamber of Deputies as various prospective bills. The decree mandates that at any given point, at least 1% of all public sector workers in the national government must be transgender, as understood in the 2012 Gender Identity Law.

On 20 July 2021, Fernández signed another decree, Decreto 476/2021, mandating the National Registry of Persons (RENAPER) to allow a third gender option on all national identity cards and passports, marked as an "X". The measure applies to non-citizen permanent residents who possess Argentine identity cards as well. In compliance with the 2012 Gender Identity Law, this made Argentina one of the few countries in the world to legally recognize non-binary gender on all official documentation.

=== Security policy ===
Fernández first appointed anthropologist Sabina Frederic as security minister. Frederic positioned herself as a staunch opponent of previous security minister Patricia Bullrich's policies. On 24 December 2019, the Ministry of Security published Resolution 1231/19, which reversed many of Bullrich's policies in the Ministry: previous protocols on firearm use by security forces were overturned, and a protocol on the use of taser guns was created. In addition, the resolution annulled the programme overseeing offenders in the railway system and the 1149 Protocol, which "allowed security forces to harm the rights of LGBT citizens".

In April 2020, Frederic stated that the ministry would continue her predecessor's policy of cyber surveillance to measure "social humour"; these statements were widely criticized by social organizations and the Opposition.

As one of his initial measures in the presidency, Fernández intervened the Federal Intelligence Agency (AFI), redirecting its budget to finance the government's plan against hunger. Attorney Cristina Caamaño was designated as interventor of the AFI on 21 December 2019. Under Fernández, the agency's powers and reach have been considerably reduced, and its files are undergoing a process of declassification to aid in the investigation of the 1994 AMIA bombing.

==== Narcotics ====
On 12 November 2020, Fernández signed a decree legalizing the self-cultivation and regulating the sales and subsidized access of medical cannabis, expanding upon a 2017 bill that legalized the use and research of the plant and its derivatives. In June 2019, during his presidential campaign, he had signaled his intention to legalize marijuana for recreational purposes, but not other types of drugs.

In February 2022, a batch of laced cocaine distributed in Puerta 8, a villa miseria in Tres de Febrero, Buenos Aires Province caused up to 23 deaths and dozens of hospitalizations. Police analyses concluded the cocaine had been tainted with opioids, resulting in a much higher rate of lethality. The Buenos Aires Province government initially warned potential consumers to throw away any cocaine they may have acquired in the 24 hours prior to the first hospitalizations, hoping to reduce casualties.

== Foreign policy ==
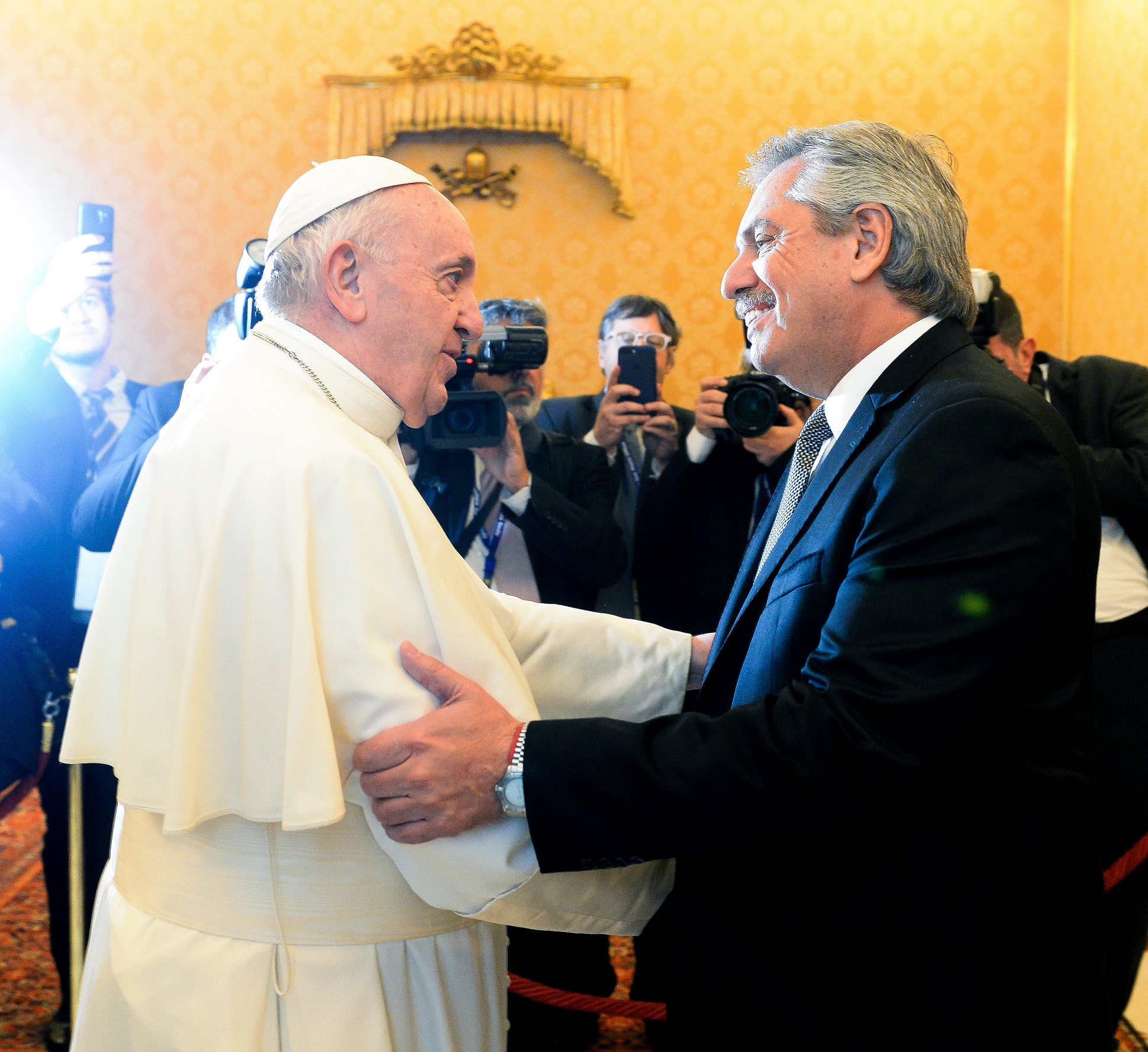
Meeting with Pope Francis on 31 January 2020

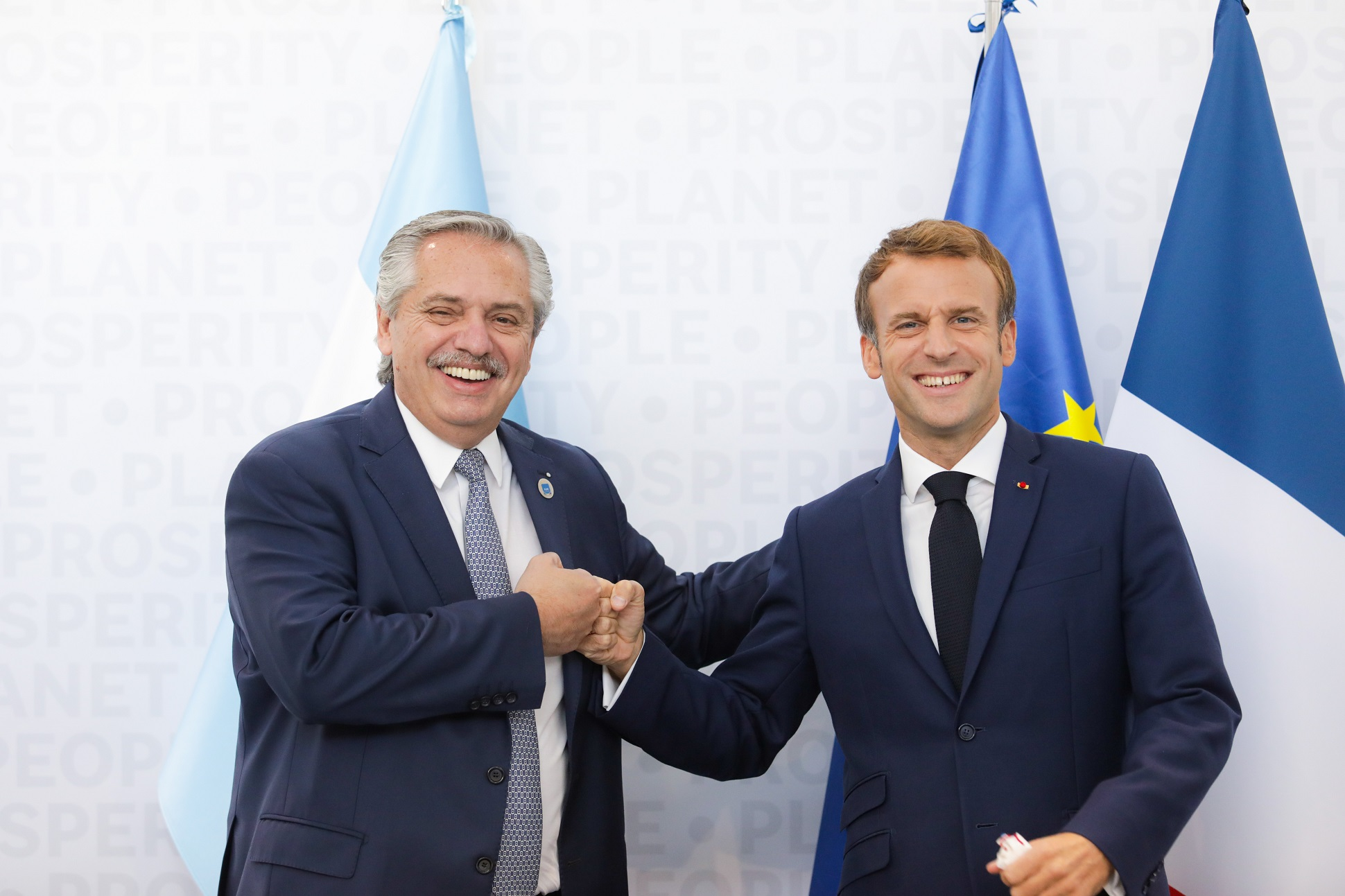
Fernández meets with French President Emmanuel Macron with in the 2021 G20 Rome summit in Rome, 30 October 2021

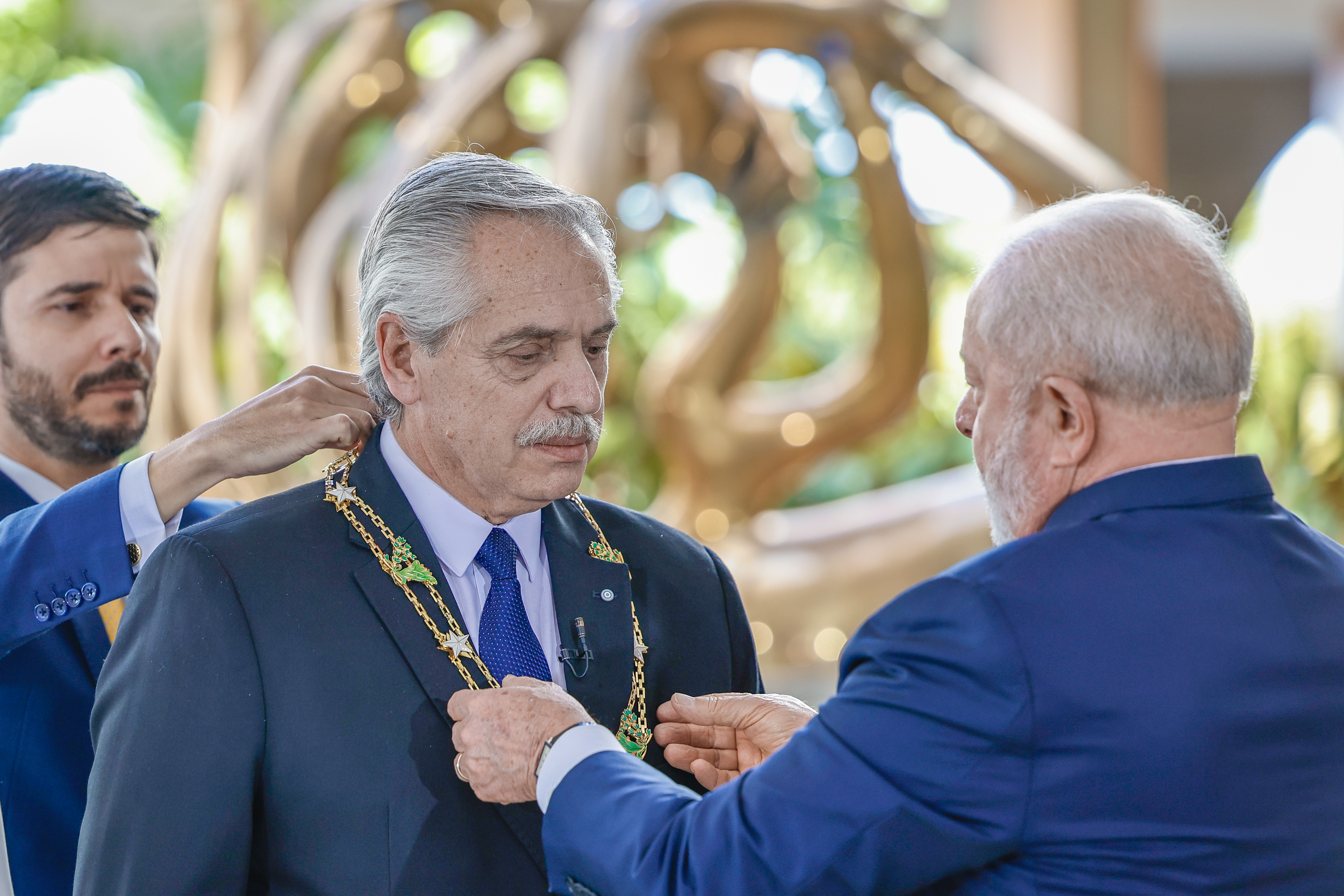
Lula awarded National Order of the Southern Cross for Fernández, June 2023

Fernández's first presidential trip abroad was to Israel in January 2020. There, he paid respects to the victims of the Holocaust and maintained a bilateral meeting with Prime Minister Benjamin Netanyahu who thanked him for keeping Hezbollah branded as a terrorist organisation, a measure taken by former President Mauricio Macri.

In January 2022, Fernández was elected president pro tempore of the Community of Latin American and Caribbean States (CELAC), succeeding Mexico's Andrés Manuel López Obrador.

=== Bolivia ===
Alberto Fernández questioned the conclusions of the Organization of American States that the reelection of Evo Morales was unconstitutional for electoral fraud. Fernández's government recognized Morales as the legitimate President of Bolivia and granted him asylum in Argentina in December 2019. On 9 November 2020, following Luis Arce's victory in the 2020 Bolivian election, Fernández personally accompanied Morales to the Argentine border with Bolivia, wherein the two leaders held a public act celebrating Morales's return to his home country.

Fernández met with Arce in the Chilean city of Viña del Mar on 11 March 2022. There, the presidents discussed a proposal to build a roadmap for cooperation between both countries by developing joint policies in the scientific and technological fields. On the issue of energy, both presidents took steps to conclude negotiations surrounding a Bolivian natural gas supply contract and agreed on the potential to advance electrical integration and interconnection between Yaguacuá, Tarija and Tartagal, Salta.

Arce made an official visit to Buenos Aires on 7 April, where he held bilateral meetings with Fernández at the Casa Rosada. Their negotiations primarily surrounded the sale of natural gas, with Bolivia agreeing to ship fourteen million cubic meters (m^{3}) of gas per day during the winter months. For this, Argentina agreed to pay between US$8 million and US$9 million for the first ten million m^{3}, with the price doubling to US$18 million for the remaining four million m^{3}. Although Argentina agreed to pay a higher price for the same volume of gas sent in 2021, it was still significantly less than what Buenos Aires would've paid to import liquefied natural gas by ship. Additionally, Bolivia agreed to prioritize Argentina for the delivery of a further four million m^{3} at a price of US$18 million should Brazil not need it.

=== China ===
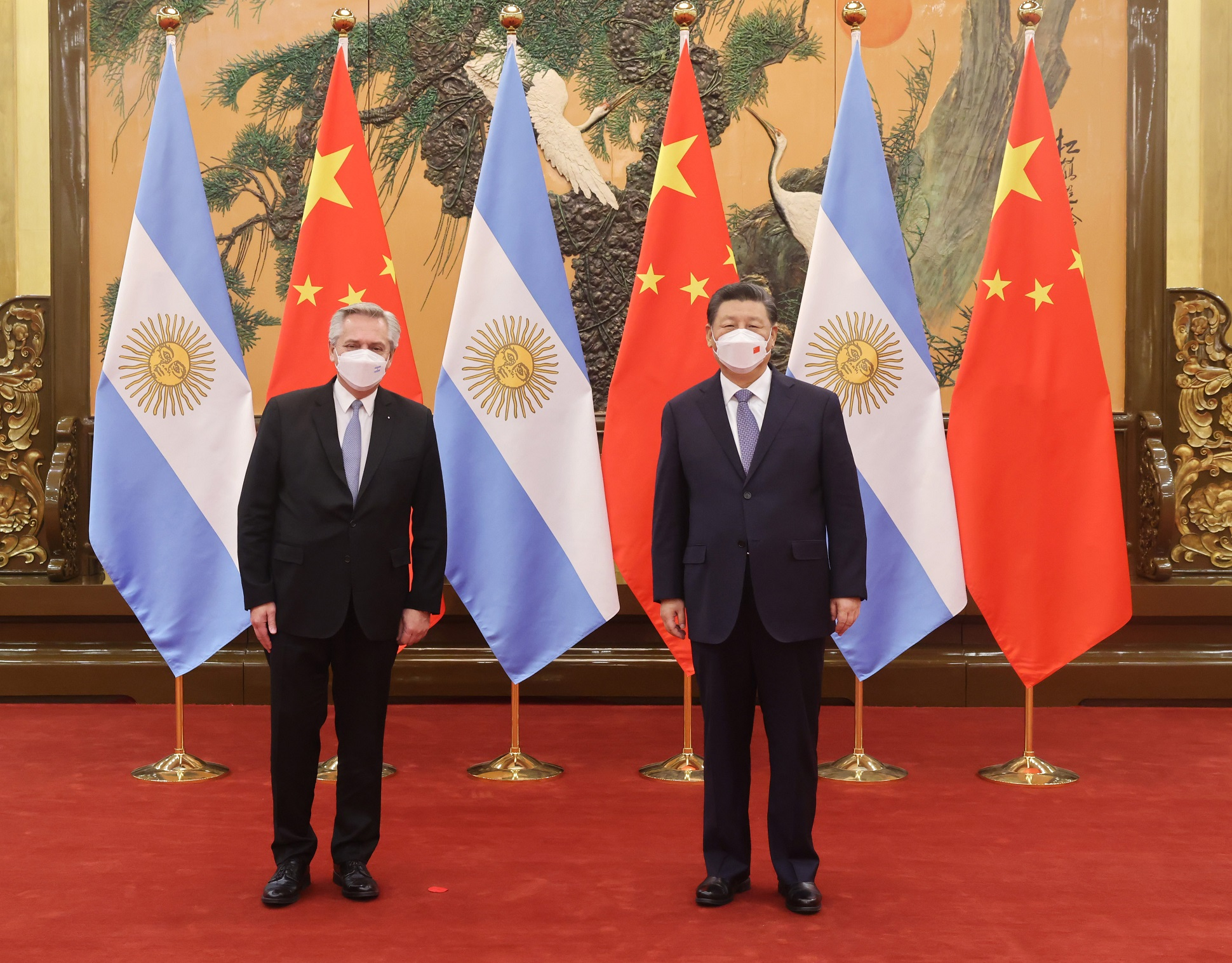
Fernández with Xi Jinping during the former's state visit to China in February 2022. During Fernández's presidency, Argentina officialised its entry into the Belt and Road Initiative

In February 2022, during a state visit to China, Fernández formally signed Argentina's entry into the Belt and Road Initiative, finalizing an accession process that had begun during the presidency of Mauricio Macri. In addition, Fernández attended the 2022 Winter Olympics opening ceremony. During the same international tour, Fernández met Russian president Vladimir Putin in Moscow and Barbadian prime minister Mia Mottley in Barbados.

BRI-based investments in Argentina include over $8,000 million US$ for a new nuclear power plant in the existing Atucha Nuclear complex. Atucha III (as the project has been dubbed) is expected to become Argentina's fourth nuclear power plant, and will create 7,000 new jobs in the sector.

=== Falkland Islands ===
On 3 January 2020, three weeks into the Fernández presidency, the Ministry of Foreign Affairs and Worship issued a statement ratifying Argentina's historic claim to sovereignty over the Falkland Islands (Malvinas), the South Georgia Islands, and the South Sandwich Islands on the 187th anniversary of the "United Kingdom's illegal occupation". The statement also called for a new round of bilateral negotiations in order to "find a peaceful and definite solution to the dispute". Fernández himself stated that the Malvinas are "a territory [Argentina] will never give up". The Fernández administration gave back secretariat-level status to the Secretariat of Malvinas Affairs, which had been demoted to an undersecretariat during Macri's government.

On 1 March 2020, during the first opening of regular sessions of Congress, Fernández once again stated the government's position on the Falklands matter, and announced three bills to deal with it: the creation of the National Council of Malvinas Affairs, the delimitation of the outer rim of the Argentine continental platform, and the modification of the federal fishing regime to harshen sanctions against illegal fishing in Argentina's claimed maritime zone.

In February 2022, during his state visit to China, Fernández signed an accord with Chinese president Xi Jinping in which China reaffirmed its support to the Argentine claim over the islands, prompting condemnation from the United Kingdom and the local government of the Falklands.

=== Iran ===
Regarding Argentina's strained relations with Iran, Fernández publicly defended the Memorandum of understanding between Argentina and Iran, although critical of this prior to taking office. In September 2020, Fernández asked Iran before the UN General Assembly to "cooperate with the Argentine justice" to bring justice to the cause and extradite those Iranian officials who stand accused of the attack. He further stated that if the officials were to be found innocent, "they could freely return to Iran or otherwise face the consequences for their actions."

=== Mercosur ===
During his administration, Argentina's relationship with Brazil has become somewhat strained. Brazilian president Jair Bolsonaro refused to attend Fernández's inauguration, accusing him of wanting to create a "great Bolivarian homeland" on the border and of preparing to provoke a flight of capital and companies into Brazil. Fernández and Bolsonaro had their first conversation through a video conference on 30 November 2020, during which both presidents agreed on the importance of cooperation and the role of Mercosur. Despite the two presidents' political differences, trade between Argentina and Brazil grew during the COVID-19 pandemic: according to the Getúlio Vargas Foundation (and based on data provided by the Brazilian economy ministry) Argentina's exports to Brazil grew more than any other countries' between January and November 2021.

The relationship with Uruguay under Fernández and Uruguayan president Luis Lacalle Pou, who was elected on the same day as Fernández, have been described as "tense". Argentina opposes Uruguay's position on the flexibilisation of the Mercosur trade bloc policies, a flagship issue for Lacalle Pou. In March 2021, during a Mercosur summit led by Fernández as president pro tempore of the bloc, Lacalle Pou stated that Mercosur "cannot become a burden" for Uruguay, while Fernández responded by saying that if the bloc had become a burden, any of its members were "free to take a different boat".

=== Russia ===
The Fernández administration has maintained friendly ties with Russia under Vladimir Putin. Argentina was the first country in Latin America to greenlight the use of the Russian-developed Sputnik V COVID-19 vaccine, and Fernández himself got the Sputnik V vaccine. Argentina was also one of the first countries outside of Russia to produce Sputnik V, with the local Richmond Laboratories providing the necessary infrastructure. Large-scale production started in June 2021.

In February 2022, Fernández visited Russia for the first time in his capacity as president, and met with Putin for bilateral talks. Fernández highlighted the friendship between both nations and stated his wish for Argentina to become "Russia's entryway to Latin America".

Argentina did not, however, support Russia during the 2022 invasion of Ukraine. Fernández himself lamented the invasion and asked "the Russian Federation to put an end to the military action and return to dialogue". Earlier, the Ministry of Foreign Affairs and Worship rejected the use of force and called on Russia to respect the charter of the United Nations and international law. Before the UN, Foreign Minister Santiago Cafiero condemned "the invasion of Ukraine as illegitimate and military operations on Ukrainian soil," and said that the world "does not tolerate more deaths or wars".

=== United States ===
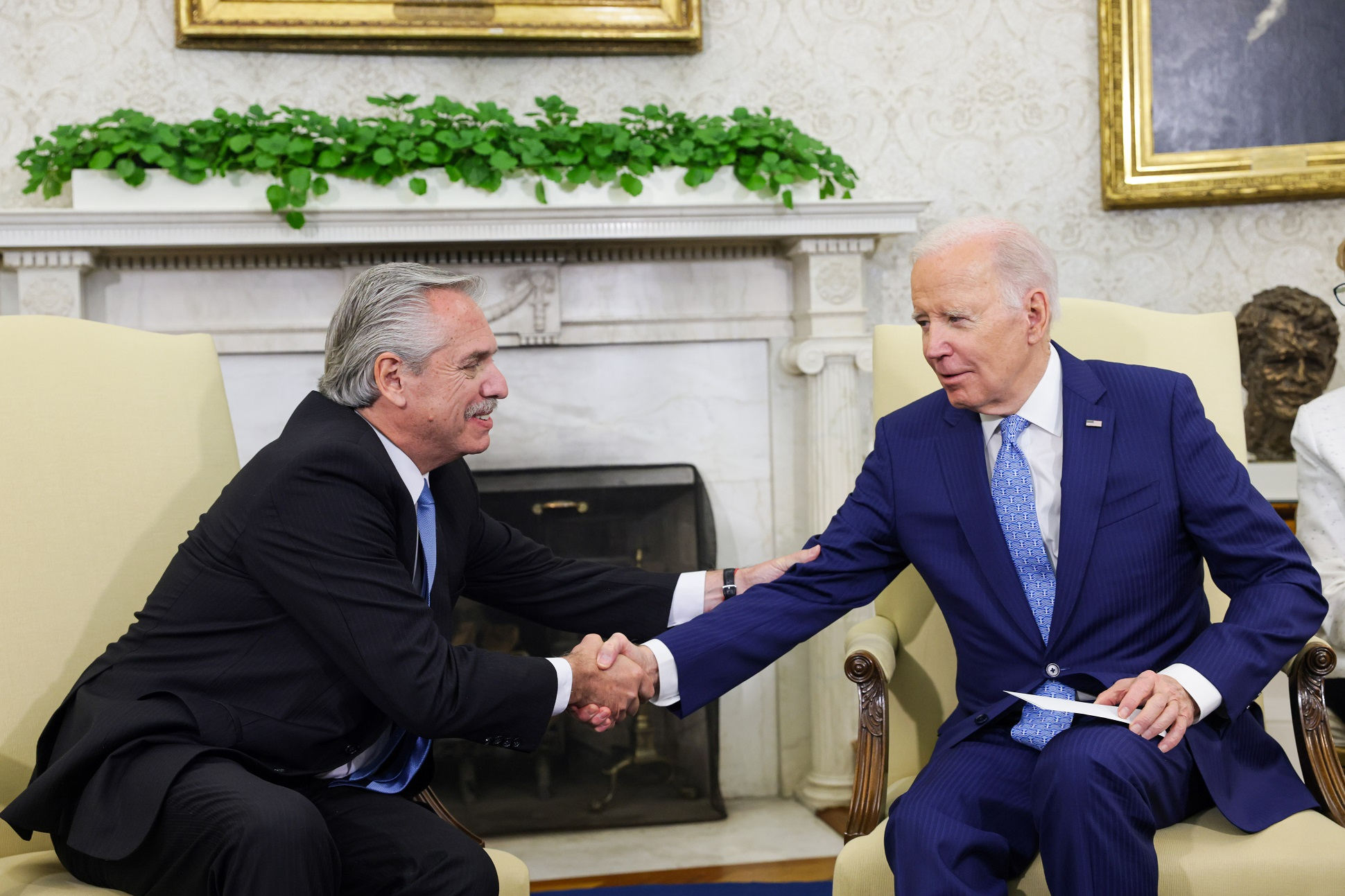
Fernández and U.S. president Joe Biden in Washington, 29 March 2023

Donald Trump's top adviser for the Western Hemisphere, Mauricio Claver-Carone, crossed Fernández in 2019 saying: "We want to know if Alberto Fernández will be a defender of democracy or an apologist for dictatorships and leaders in the region, whether it be Maduro, Correa or Morales."

=== Venezuela ===
Under Fernández, Argentina has exited the Lima Group, formed by North and South American nations to address the crisis in Venezuela, after not subscribing to any of the Group's statements and resolutions. Argentina voted in favour of the United Nations resolution to back the continuity of the UN Human Rights Office report on human rights violations in Venezuela. Under Fernández, Argentina withdrew recognition of Juan Guaidó as interim President of Venezuela. In January 2020, the Fernández administration revoked the credentials of Guaidó's envoy in Argentina, Elisa Trotta Gamus. However, Fernández also refused to recognise Maduro's envoy Stella Lugo's credentials and Foreign Minister Felipe Solá asked her to return to Caracas.

=== List of international trips and state visits ===
Date(s)	Country	Details	Ref
2020
22–25 January 2020	Israel	State visit. Met with by Prime Minister Benjamin Netanyahu.	
31 January 2020	Vatican City	State visit. Met with Pope Francis.	
31 January 2020	Italy	State visit. Met with President Sergio Mattarella and Prime Minister Giuseppe Conte	
3 February 2020	Germany	State visit. Met with Chancellor Angela Merkel	
4 February 2020	Spain	State visit. Met with King Felipe VI and Prime Minister Pedro Sánchez.	
5 February 2020	France	State visit. Met with President Emmanuel Macron.	
8 November 2020	Bolivia	Attended the inauguration of President-elect Luis Arce.	
2021
22–24 February 2021	Mexico	State visit. Met with President Andrés Manuel López Obrador.	
28 July 2021	Peru	Attended the inauguration of President-elect Pedro Castillo.	
29–31 October 2021	Italy	Attended the 2021 G20 Rome summit.	
31 October – 11 November 2021	United Kingdom	Attended the 2021 United Nations Climate Change Conference.	
2022
2–3 February 2022	Russia	State visit. Met with President Vladimir Putin.	
3–6 February 2022	China	State visit. Met with President Xi Jinping and attended the 2022 Winter Olympics opening ceremony.	
7–8 February 2022	Barbados	State visit. Met with Prime Minister Mia Mottley.	
11 March 2022	Chile	Attended the inauguration of President-elect Gabriel Boric.	
10–11 May 2022	Spain	State visit. Met with King Felipe VI and Prime Minister Pedro Sánchez.	
11–12 May 2022	Germany	State visit. Met with Chancellor Olaf Scholz.	
12–13 May 2022	France	State visit. Met with President Emmanuel Macron.	
8–10 May 2022	United States	Attended the 9th Summit of the Americas.	
26–29 June 2022	Germany	Attended the 48th G7 summit.	
18-21 September 2022	United States	Attended the 77th general debate of the UNGA	
10-12 November 2022	France	Attended the fifth edition of the Paris Peace Forum	
14-16 November 2022	Indonesia	Attended the 2022 G20 Bali summit	
18 November 2022	Spain	Working visit. Met with Vice President Yolanda Díaz	
2023
1-2 January 2023	Brazil	Attended the inauguration of President-elect Lula da Silva	
24-25 March 2023	Dominican Republic	Attended the 28th Ibero-American summit	
27-29 March 2023	United States	State Visit. Met with President Joe Biden	
5 April 2023	Chile	Attended the ceremony for the 205th anniversary of the Embrace of Maipú. Met with Gabriel Boric.	
2 May 2023	Brazil	State Visit. Met with President Lula da Silva	
29-30 May 2023	Brazil	Attended the meeting of South American Presidents	
1 June 2023	Bolivia	Working Visit. Met with President Luis Arce	
27 June 2023	Brazil	State Visit. Met with President Lula da Silva.	
17-19 July 2023	Belgium	Attended the third EU-CELAC summit.	
15 August 2023	Paraguay	Attended the inauguration of President-elect Santiago Peña.	
8-10 September 2023	India	Attended the 2023 G20 New Delhi summit.	
15-16 September 2023	Cuba	Attended the G77+China summit.	
18-19 September 2023	United States	Attended the General debate of the 78th UNGA.	
14-18 October 2023	China	Attended the Third Belt and Road Forum.	
27 October 2023	Uruguay	Working Visit. Met with President Luis Lacalle Pou and Santiago Peña	
7 December 2023	Brazil	Attended the 63rd Mercosur Heads of State Summit	

== Controversies ==
Fernández has engaged in disputes with users on Twitter before his presidency, in which his reactions have been regarded as aggressive or violent by some. Tweets show him responding to other users with expletives such as "pelotudo" (Argentinian slang for "asshole"), "pajero" ("wanker"), and "hijo de puta" ("son of a bitch"); he also called presidential candidate José Luis Espert "Pajert", a word play between his last name and the Argentine slang for "wanker". In December 2017, he responded to a female user by saying, "Girl, what you think doesn't worry me. You better learn how to cook. Maybe then you can do something right. Thinking is not your strong suit".

In June 2020, he told journalist Cristina Pérez to "go read the Constitution", after being questioned about his attempts to install a government-designated administration in the Vicentín agricultural conglomerate.

On 9 June 2021, during a working meeting with business leaders alongside Spanish Prime Minister Pedro Sánchez at the Casa Rosada, Fernández sought to play up the Argentinian ties with Europe by saying that "The Mexicans came from the Indians, the Brazilians came from the jungle, but we Argentines came from the ships. And they were ships that came from Europe." Fernández erroneously attributed the quote to the Mexican poet, essayist and diplomat Octavio Paz, although it had originated from lyrics by local musician and personal friend Litto Nebbia. Faced with the negative backlash to his comments, on the same day Fernández apologized on Twitter and the next day sent a letter to the director of the National Institute Against Discrimination, Xenophobia and Racism (INADI), clarifying his comments.

In August 2021, it was revealed that there had been numerous visits to the presidential palace during the lockdown that he had imposed in early 2020 due to the COVID-19 pandemic; visitors included an actress, a dog trainer, and a hairdresser, as well as hosting a birthday party for the First Lady.

== See also ==
- Politics of Argentina
