= Facundo Diz =

Argentine footballer

Personal information
- Full name: Facundo Ignacio Diz
- Date of birth: April 16, 1979 (age 47)
- Place of birth: Navarro, Argentina
- Height: 6 ft 2 in (1.88 m)
- Position: Forward

Youth career
- All Boys

Senior career*
Years	Team	Apps	(Gls)
1997–2006	All Boys	158	(40)
2004	→ Banfield (loan)	2	(0)
2005–2006	→ Deportivo Táchira (loan)	14	(1)
2006	→ San Telmo (loan)	26	(2)
2006–2008	Tigre	38	(3)
2008	Olimpo	10	(1)
2009	Platense	18	(9)
2009	Colorado Rapids	8	(0)
2010–2011	Platense	4	(4)
2011–2014	Quilmes	60	(7)
2014–2016	Tristán Suárez	86	(33)
2016–2017	UAI Urquiza	31	(5)
2017–2018	Sportivo Italiano	25	(9)
- * Club domestic league appearances and goals

Facundo Ignacio Diz (born 16 April 1979) is an Argentine retired footballer and politician.

Since 2020, he has served as mayor of his hometown, Navarro (Buenos Aires Province).

== Career ==
=== South America ===
Diz began his career with Club Atlético All Boys in 1997, playing with the club for eight season. He spent brief loan spells in 2004 with Banfield as well as Venezuelan side Deportivo Táchira before returning to Argentina and All Boys for their 2005 campaign. Following a loan stint with Club Atlético San Telmo, Diz played the 2006–2008 seasons with Club Atlético Tigre. Following a six-month run with Olimpo de Bahía Blanca at the end of 2008, Diz caught on with Club Atlético Platense in 2009, where he scored nine goals in 15 games, helping the team avoid relegation.

=== North America ===
Diz signed with Major League Soccer club Colorado Rapids in July 2009, making his debut as a substitute in a 4–0 victory over New York Red Bulls on July 25, 2009. However, Diz was released by Colorado on March 9, 2010.

== Political career ==
He was the president of the municipal council of Navarro from 2019 until November 2020 when the previous mayor, Santiago Maggiotti, took a leave of absence to become the Minister of Territorial Development and Habitat in Alberto Fernández's cabinet, leaving Diz as the interim mayor.

Diz was formally elected to the post of mayor in October 2023, which extended his mandate until 2027.
