= Magdalena Sierra =

Argentine architect and politician

Mayor of Avellaneda
- Incumbent
- Assumed office 3 July 2026
- Preceded by: Jorge Ferraresi

National Deputy
- In office 10 December 2017 – 10 December 2021
- Constituency: Buenos Aires

Provincial Senator of Buenos Aires
- In office 10 December 2015 – 10 December 2017
- Constituency: Third Electoral Section

Personal details
- Born: 25 June 1966 (age 60) Buenos Aires, Argentina
- Party: Justicialist Party
- Other political affiliations: Front for Victory (2013–2017); Unidad Ciudadana (2017–2019); Frente de Todos (2019–2023)
- Spouse: Jorge Ferraresi
- Education: University of Buenos Aires
- Profession: Architect, politician

Ada María Magdalena Sierra (born 25 June 1966) is an Argentine architect and politician who served as a National Deputy from 2017 to 2021, elected in Buenos Aires Province. A member of the Justicialist Party, she was elected in 2017 as part of Unidad Ciudadana. Sierra previously served as a member of the Buenos Aires Province Senate from 2015 to 2017, representing the Third Electoral Section.

Since 2025 she has served as intendenta (mayor) of Avellaneda. She previously served in Avellaneda's city council multiple times.

== Early and personal life ==
Sierra was born on 25 June 1966 in Buenos Aires. She studied architecture at the University of Buenos Aires, graduating in 2007. She is married to Jorge Ferraresi, former intendente of Avellaneda and current Minister of Territorial Development and Habitat in the cabinet of Alberto Fernández. Sierra and Ferraresi have two children.

== Political career ==
Sierra was Undersecretary of Municipal Planning in Avellaneda from 2009 to 2013, during her husband's first term as mayor. In 2013, she ran for a seat in the Avellaneda City Council, as part of the Front for Victory list; she was elected. In the 2015 provincial elections, Sierra was elected as Provincial Senator for the Third Electoral Section.

Sierra ran for a seat in the Argentine Chamber of Deputies in the 2017 legislative election; she was the 11th candidate in the Unidad Ciudadana list in Buenos Aires Province. The Unidad Ciudadana list received 36.28% of the votes, and Sierra made it past the D'Hondt cut to be elected. She was sworn in on 6 December 2017.

As a national deputy, Sierra formed part of the parliamentary commissions on Habitat and Urban Planning, Addiction Prevention, Sports, Disabilities, Women and Diversity, Municipal Affairs, and Public Works. She was a supporter of the 2020 Voluntary Interruption of Pregnancy bill, which legalized abortion in Argentina.

Ahead of the 2021 legislative election, Sierra was confirmed as one of the candidates in the Frente de Todos list to the Avellaneda City Council.

== Electoral history ==
Electoral history of Magdalena Sierra
Election	Office	List	#	District	Votes			Result	Ref.
Election	Office	List	#	District	Total	%	P.	Result	Ref.
2013	Councillor	Front for Victory	1	Avellaneda Partido	84,327	39.20%	1st (Note: Presented on an electoral list. The data shown represents the share of the vote the entire party/alliance received in that constituency.)	Elected	
2015	Provincial Senator	Front for Victory	3	Third Electoral Section	1,336,356	42.25%	1st	Elected	
2017	National Deputy	Unidad Ciudadana	11	Buenos Aires Province	3,383,114	36.28%	2nd	Elected	
2021	Councillor	Frente de Todos	1	Avellaneda Partido	94,378	48.94%	1st	Elected	

Political offices
Preceded by Jorge Ferraresi	Mayor of Avellaneda; 2026–present	Incumbent
