= Santiago Maggiotti =

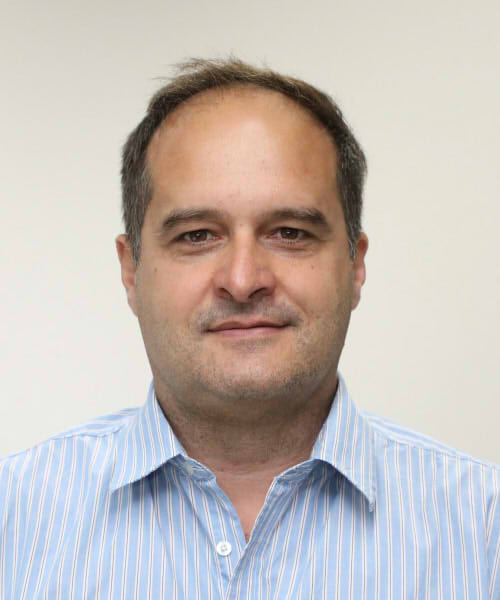

Minister of Territorial Development and Habitat
- In office 1 November 2022 – 10 December 2023
- President: Alberto Fernández
- Preceded by: Jorge Ferraresi
- Succeeded by: Office abolished

Mayor of Navarro
- In office 10 December 2011 – 11 November 2020
- Preceded by: Alfredo Castellari
- Succeeded by: Facundo Diz

Personal details
- Born: 9 December 1974 (age 51) Navarro, Buenos Aires Province, Argentina
- Party: Justicialist Party

Santiago Alejandro Maggiotti (Spanish pronunciation: [sanˈtjaɣo aleˈxandɾo maˈxjoti]; born 9 December 1974) is an Argentine politician and economist who served as Minister of Territorial Development and Habitat from 2022 to 2023 in the cabinet of Alberto Fernández.

== Early life and education ==
Santiago Alejandro Maggiotti was born on 9 December 1974 in Navarro, Buenos Aires Province. His father, Santiago Aníbal Maggiotti, was a Justicialist Party National Deputy and mayor for Navarro in the 1990s. Maggiotti studied economics and received a master's degree in public policy.

== Political career ==
In 2011, Maggiotti was elected as mayor of Navarro for the first time, defeating the Radical Civic Union for the first time in 12 years. He was reelected in 2015 and 2019. In November 2020, he resigned from the office of mayor to serve as Secretary of Territorial Development and Habitat under Jorge Ferraresi. He was succeeded as mayor of Navarro by Facundo Diz.

At the end of October 2022, Jorge Ferraresi announced his intention to return to his former position as mayor of Avellaneda. Alberto Fernández announced that Maggiotti would replace Ferraresi on 1 November 2022.
