= President Fernández =

President Fernández may refer to:

- Alberto Fernández (born 1959), President of Argentina from 2019 to 2023
  - Presidency of Alberto Fernández, his presidency
- Cristina Fernández de Kirchner (born 1953), President of Argentina from 2007 to 2015
  - Presidency of Cristina Fernández de Kirchner, her presidency
- Leonel Fernández (born 1953), President of the Dominican Republic from 1996 to 2000 and from 2004 to 2012
- Próspero Fernández Oreamuno (1834–1885), President of Costa Rica from 1882 to 1885

== See also ==
- Fernández
