= Las Marianas =

- Town
- Location within Buenos Aires Province
- Coordinates: 35°02′57″S 59°30′35″W
- Country: Argentina
- Province: Buenos Aires
- Partidos: Navarro
- Established: December 29, 1908
- Elevation: 24 m (79 ft)

Population (2001 Census)
  - Total: 471
- Time zone: UTC−3 (ART)
- CPA Base: B 6607
- Climate: Dfc

Las Marianas is a town located in the Navarro Partido in the province of Buenos Aires, Argentina.

== Geography ==
Las Marianas is located 27 km (17 mi) from the town of Navarro and 130 km (81 mi) from the city of Buenos Aires.

== History ==
The land around the town was first purchased by an attorney in the late 1700s. Around the late 19th century, land was sold in the region for a train station. Las Marianas was founded on December 29, 1908. Rail service to the town ended in 1993.

== Population ==
In the mid-20th century, the town's population peaked at around 1,500. According to INDEC, which collects population data for the country, the town had a population of 471 people as of the 2001 census.
