= Stefanía Cora =

Argentine politician (born 1989)

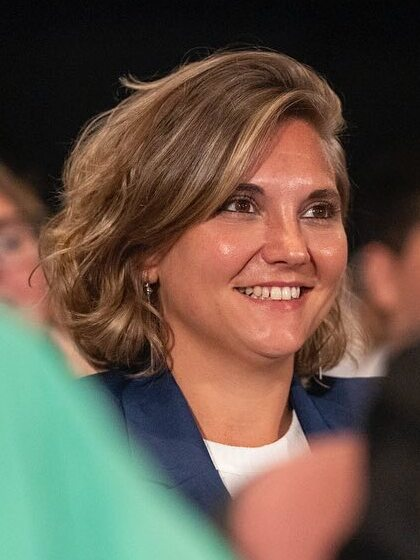
- Stefanía Cora in 2024

Member of the Argentine Senate for Entre Ríos Province
- Incumbent
- Assumed office 20 February 2025

Deputy of the Province of Entre Ríos
- In office 10 December 2019 – 19 February 2025

Personal details
- Born: 6 August 1989 (age 36) Concordia, Entre Ríos
- Party: Justicialist Party

Stefanía Cora (born 6 August 1989) is an Argentine politician, member of La Cámpora and national senator for Entre Ríos Province since 20 February 2025, replacing the former senator Edgardo Kueider who was expelled for moral incapacity.

== Early years and professional career ==
Cora began her political career in 2014 working at the Center for Access to Justice of the Ministry of Justice. In 2015, she joined the Justicialist Front for Victory council members in the city of Paraná. In 2019, she was elected to the Entre Ríos Legislature and won re-election in the 2023 provincial legislative elections.

She pursued a Bachelor's and Professorship in History at the National University of the Littoral, which complements his political career with a solid academic background.

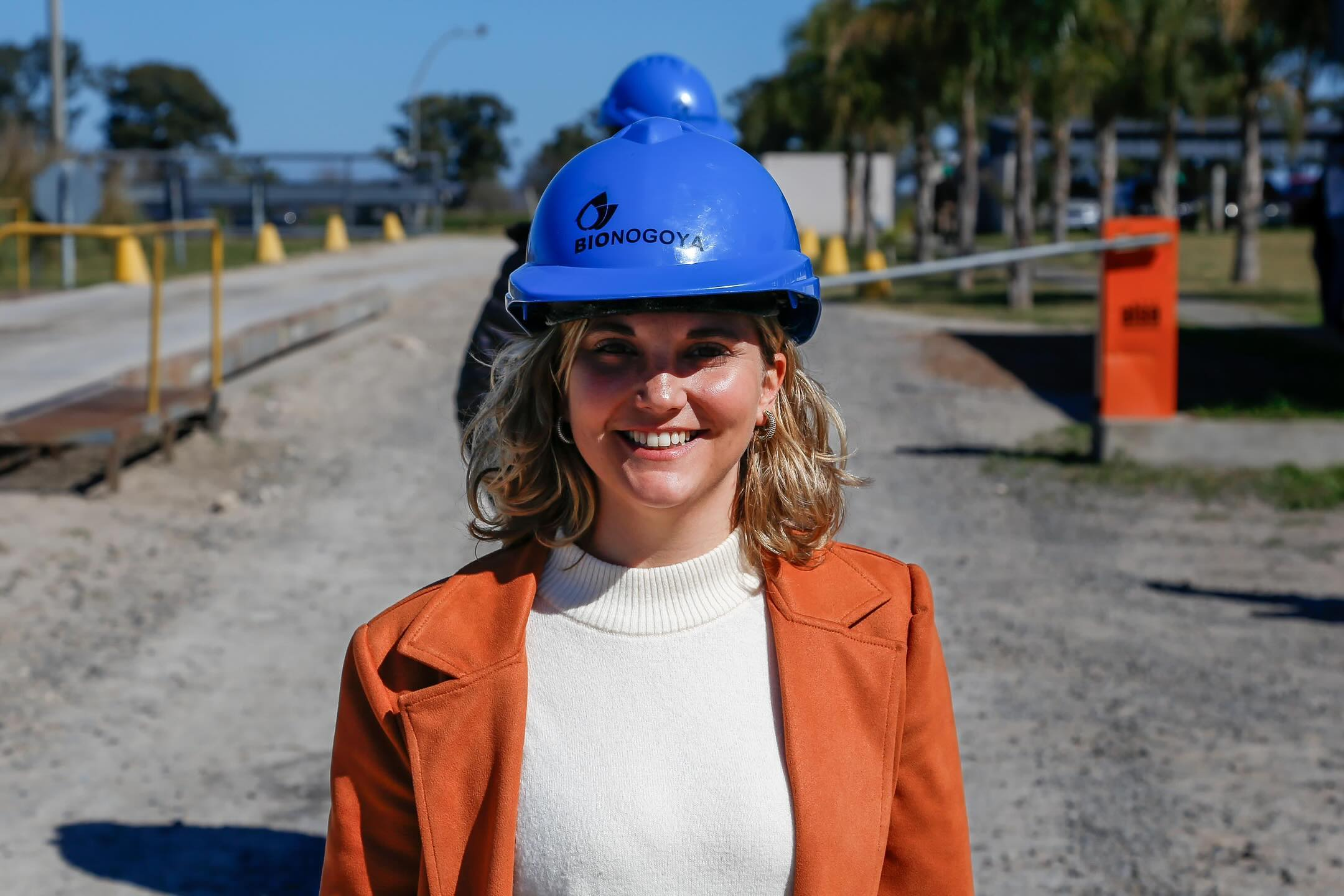
Stefania Cora visiting Bionogoya, an Entre Ríos company dedicated to the production and marketing of biofuels, glycerin, and glycerol.

== Political career ==
In her youth, Cora stood out as a fervent opponent of the government of former Paraná mayor Sergio Varisco, whom she openly criticized during her time on the City Council. She was also a key figure in the fight for the Comprehensive Parity Law in Entre Ríos, which seeks to guarantee gender equality in politics, although its implementation has been partial.

She completed her first years of medical school but eventually earned a degree in Political Science. At 18, she joined the Justicialist Party. Since then, she has trained in public policy with a rights-based approach and specialized in the design, evaluation, and implementation of social, health, education, and community programs.

In 2019, she was a candidate for deputy in the Entre Ríos legislative elections and the second-place candidate for THE Argentine Senate in the national elections. She finished second on the national list of candidates. She was later accused of aligning herself with Javier Milei's government, which allowed Cora to take a leadership position in her current coalition within the Entre Ríos PJ.

Senator Edgardo Kueider would be removed for "moral incapacity" by the Chamber itself, and Cora assumed as his successor on 20 February 2025, becoming one of the youngest senators to represent Entre Ríos.

== Activism and projects ==
Cora has been a prominent speaker in the Chamber of Deputies of Entre Ríos, especially in opposition to the policies of Governor Rogelio Frigerio. Her commitment to gender and feminist issues is also reflected in her legislative initiatives, such as the proposal for an "Awareness, Training, and Dissemination Program on Alternative Masculinities," presented in 2024.

== Recognitions and leadership ==
Considered one of the most influential young women in Kirchnerism in Entre Ríos, Cora is known for her closeness to key figures in the movement , especially the Patria Institute. Her negotiating skills within her political force have been notable, although her loyalty to Kirchnerism often places her at the center of internal disputes within the PJ .
