= Ministry of Women, Genders and Diversity (Argentina) =

Former government ministry of Argentina

- Ministerio de las Mujeres, Géneros y Diversidad
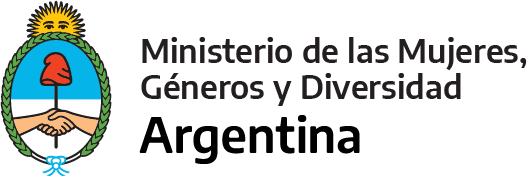

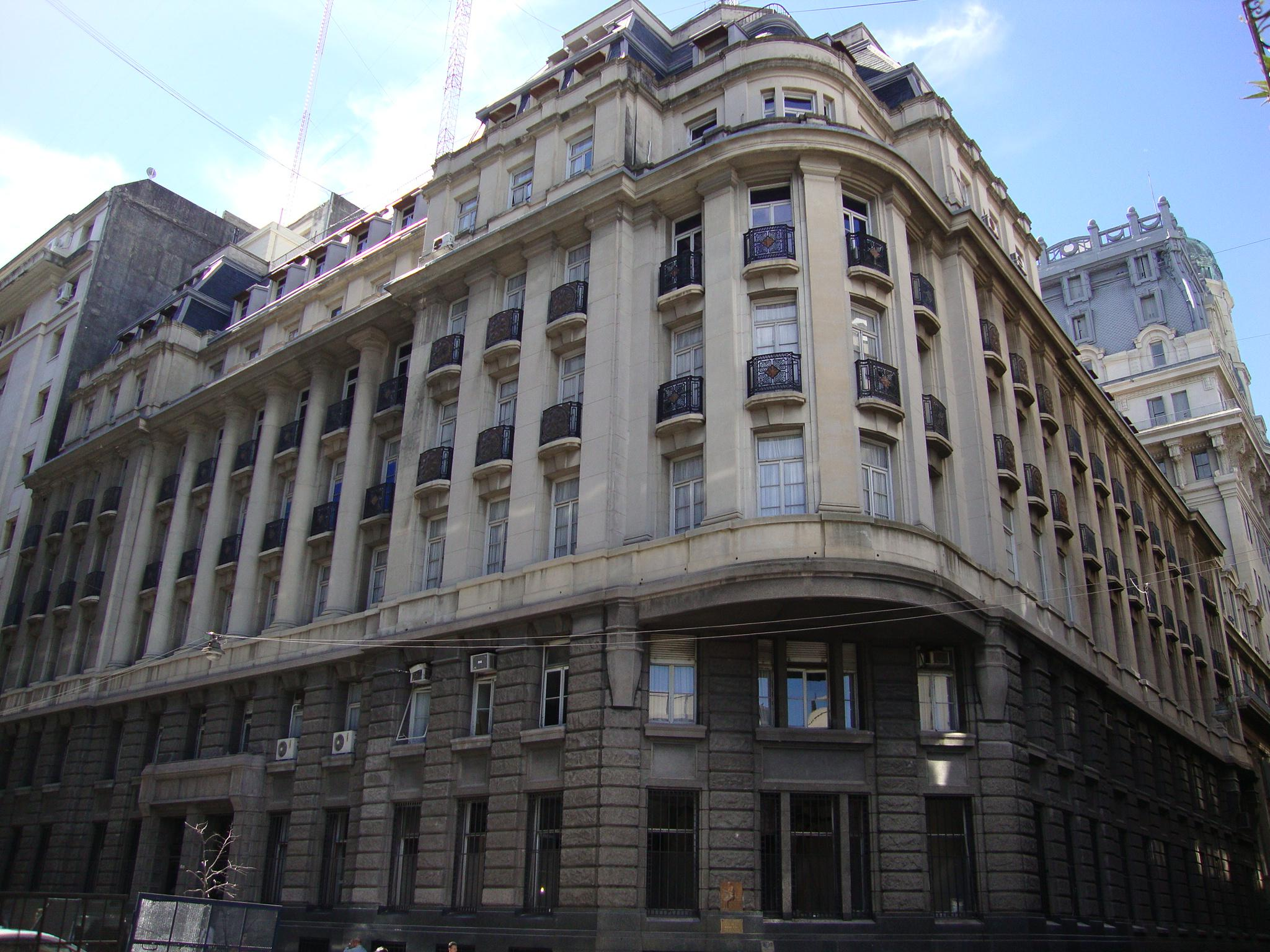
- Ministry headquarters in Buenos Aires

Ministry overview
- Formed: 2019
- Preceding Ministry: National Institute for Women
- Dissolved: June 2024; 2 years ago
- Jurisdiction: Argentina
- Headquarters: Balcarce 186, Buenos Aires
- Annual budget: $ 6,204,800,623 (2021)
- Minister responsible: Ayelén Mazzina

The Ministry of Women, Genders and Diversity (Spanish: Ministerio de las Mujeres, Géneros y Diversidad; MMGyD) was a ministry of the Argentine Government tasked with overseeing the country's public policies on issues affecting women and gender and sexual minorities. The ministry was created in 2019, as one of the initial measures of President Alberto Fernández; the first minister was Elizabeth Gómez Alcorta.

The ministry overtook the responsibilities of the National Institute for Women (Instituto Nacional de la Mujer; INAM), which existed from 2017 to 2019.

The ministry was dissolved in December 2023 following an announcement by President Javier Milei after his inauguration. The ministry became a provisional undersecretary until June 2024, when it was definitely closed. The Milei administration alleged the ministry was a "politicized entity" in order to justify its suppression. The government also alleged that "This organization was created and used by the previous administration to propagate and impose an ideological agenda", stating also that "none of its actions resulted in the lowering of the number of crimes against women".

== Structure ==
The Ministry was subdivided into the following dependencies:

- Secretariat of Equality and Diversity Policies (Secretaría de Políticas de Igualdad y Diversidad)
  - Undersecretariat of Equality Policies (Subsecretaría de Políticas de Igualdad)
  - Undersecretariat of Diversity Policies (Subsecretaría de Políticas de Diversidad)
- Secretariat of Policies against Gender-based Violence (Secretaría de Políticas contra la Violencia por Razones de Género)
  - Undersecretariat for a Comprehensive Approach to Gender-based Violence (Subsecretaría de Abordaje Integral de la Violencia por Razones de Género)
  - Undersecretariat of Special Programmes against Gender-based Violence (Subsecretaría de Programas Especiales contra la Violencia por Razones de Género)
  - Undersecretariat of Training, Research and Cultural Policies for Equality (Subsecretaría de Formación, Investigación y Políticas Culturales para la Igualdad)

=== Headquarters ===
The Ministry's offices were located across three other government facilities, the main one being the one located at Balcarce 186, in the Buenos Aires barrio of Monserrat. In April 2020 the government announced plans to house the whole ministry in the offices at Cochabamba 54, in the barrio of San Telmo.

== List of ministers ==
No.	Minister	Party	Term	President
1	Elizabeth Gómez Alcorta	Patria Grande Front	10 December 2019 – 7 October 2022	Alberto Fernández
2	Ayelén Mazzina	Justicialist Party	10 October 2022 – 10 December 2023	Alberto Fernández

== See also ==
- Feminism in Argentina
- LGBT rights in Argentina
- Women in Argentina
