= José Juan Almeyra =

- Location in Argentina Location in Buenos Aires Province
- Coordinates: 34°55′S 59°34′W
- Country: Argentina
- Province: Buenos Aires
- Partido: Navarro
- Elevation: 45 m (148 ft)

Population (2010 census [INDEC])
  - Total: 207
- CPA Base: B 6603
- Area code: +54 02272

José Juan Almeyra is a village in Navarro Partido, Buenos Aires Province, Argentina.

== Services ==
=== Hospital ===
It has one hospital.

== Education ==
=== Kindergarten ===
It has one kindergarten.

=== Primary ===
It has one primary school.
