= Villa Moll =

- Town
- Location within Buenos Aires Province
- Coordinates: 35°04′S 59°39′W
- Country: Argentina
- Province: Buenos Aires
- Partidos: Navarro
- Established: January 31, 1908
- Elevation: 35 m (115 ft)

Population (2001 Census)
  - Total: 612
- Time zone: UTC−3 (ART)
- CPA Base: B 6627
- Climate: Dfc

Villa Moll is a town located in the Navarro Partido in the province of Buenos Aires, Argentina.

== Geography ==
Villa Moll is located 162 km (101 mi) from the city of Buenos Aires.

== History ==
Villa Moll was founded on January 31, 1908, following the construction of a railway station by the Argentine General Railway Company. A couple who owned land in the region donated 92 ha (230 acres) of land for the creation of the town. The building housing the town's municipal designation was built in 1957, and a church was constructed in 1960.

== Economy ==
The town's economy is largely rural, based on dairy and cereal production as well as general agriculture. In recent years, Villa Moll has also seen an increase in tourism contributing to the local economy.

== Population ==
According to INDEC, which collects population data for the country, the town had a population of 612 people as of the 2001 census.
