= Patria Institute =

Argentine think tank

- Instituto Patria
- Formation: April 7, 2016; 10 years ago
- Founder: Cristina Kirchner
- Type: Think tank
- Legal status: Foundation
- Headquarters: Buenos Aires
- Website: institutopatria.com.ar

The Patria Institute ("Patria" meaning "Fatherland" while also serving as the initials for Pensamiento, Acción y Trabajo para la Inclusión Americana, or "Thought, Action, and Work for American Inclusion" in English), often stylized as PATRIA Institute, is an Argentine think tank headquartered in Buenos Aires, dedicated to the promotion of Latin American and kirchnerist thought, to the research of the region's political processes, and to the development of inclusive policies.

== History ==
The Patria Institute was founded on April 7, 2016. It was officially inaugurated on April 13 through a Facebook message on its official page. It was founded in 2016 by former Argentine president and current Argentine vice-president Cristina Kirchner.

In 2022, the institute clashed with the Presidency over a loan agreement with the IMF.

== Authorities ==
- Honorary President: Cristina Fernández de Kirchner
- President: Oscar Parrilli
- Vice president: Jorge Ferraresi
- Secretary: Teresa Sellarés
- Treasurer: Adriana Fontana
