= María Eugenia Bielsa =

Argentine politician

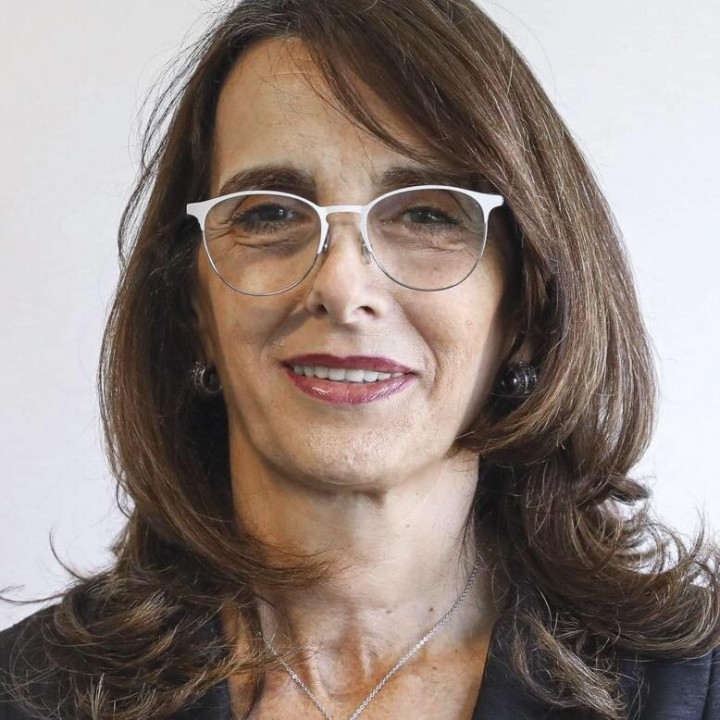

Minister of Territorial Development and Habitat
- In office 10 December 2019 – 11 November 2020
- President: Alberto Fernández
- Preceded by: New post
- Succeeded by: Jorge Ferraresi

Personal details
- Born: 10 March 1958 (age 68) Rosario, Santa Fe Province, Argentina
- Party: Justicialist Party
- Other political affiliations: Front for All (2019–present)
- Education: National University of Rosario

María Eugenia Bielsa (Spanish pronunciation: [maˈɾia ewˈxenja ˈbjelsa]; born 10 March 1958) is an Argentine Justicialist Party politician, born in Rosario, Santa Fe. She was the vice-governor of Santa Fe, accompanying governor Jorge Obeid, from 2003 until 2007. As such, she also presides the provincial Senate. She is the sister of politician Rafael Bielsa and of football coach Marcelo Bielsa. From 2019 to 2020 she served as Minister of Territorial Development and Habitat in the cabinet of Alberto Fernández.

== Political career ==
Prior to the 2005 legislative elections, President Néstor Kirchner asked Bielsa to run for a highly contested seat at the national Chamber of Deputies, but she refused, stating that she had a mandate to finish her term in the office for which she was elected. Governor Obeid again asked Bielsa to run for mayor of Rosario in the 2007 general elections at the end of their term. She did not explicitly refuse or accept that request at the time, but eventually other mayoral candidates presented themselves instead. Bielsa was elected to be a council member in Rosario's municipal election as head of the Bloque Encuentro por Rosario.

From 2019 to 2020 she served Minister of Territorial Development and Habitat. During her time in the position, she announced the relaunch of the PRO.CRE.AR national program, which provided loans for housing construction. The program was originally launched from 2012 until it was discontinued in 2018, and at the time of its relaunch included nine lines of loans for the construction and renovation of loans. In September 2020, it was announced that the task of urbanizing popular neighborhoods would be transferred from her ministry to the Ministry of Social Development. She presented her resignation from the office on 11 November 2020, and the then Mayor of Avellaneda, Jorge Ferraresi, was immediately announced as her successor. Speculation arose that she resigned after a letter from Cristina Kirchner, who accused some ministers of not working, which some took as a jab at not executing the entire budget and maintaining vacant secretariats.

== Personal life ==
Bielsa is an architect, and she taught at the Faculty of Architecture of the National University of Rosario. She is married to an architect and has a son who is studying the same career. Her husband died in May 2007.
