= Navarro Partido =

Navarro Partido de Navarro
- Department
- Flag Coat of arms

- location of Navarro Partido in Buenos Aires Province
- Coordinates: 35°01′S 59°16′W
- Country: Argentina
- Established: October 12, 1881
- Founder: ?
- Seat: Navarro

Government
  - Intendant: Facundo Diz (PJ)

Area
  - Total: 1,630 km^{2} (630 sq mi)

Population
  - Total: 15,797
  - Density: 9.69/km^{2} (25.1/sq mi)
- Demonym: navarrense
- Postal Code: B6605
- IFAM: BUE087
- Area Code: 02272
- Website: www.navarro.gov.ar

Navarro is a partido in the northeast of Buenos Aires Province in Argentina.

The provincial subdivision has a population of about 16,000 inhabitants in an area of 1,630 km^{2} (630 sq mi), and its capital city is Navarro, which is around 100 km (62 mi) from Buenos Aires.

== Settlements ==
- José J. Almeyra
- Las Marianas
- Navarro
- Villa Moll
- Jose Juan Almeyra
