= Ayelén Mazzina =

Argentine politician

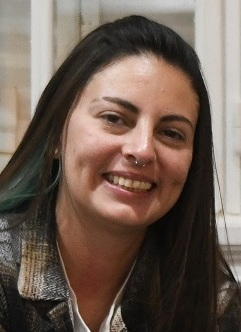

Minister of Women, Genders and Diversity
- In office 13 October 2022 – 10 December 2023
- President: Alberto Fernández
- Preceded by: Elizabeth Gómez Alcorta
- Succeeded by: Office abolished

Secretary of Women, Diversity and Equality of San Luis
- In office 12 December 2019 – 10 October 2022
- Governor: Alberto Rodríguez Saá
- Preceded by: Adriana Bazzano

Personal details
- Born: 7 September 1989 (age 37) San Luis, Argentina
- Party: Justicialist Party
- Other political affiliations: Frente de Todos (2019–present)

Ximena Ayelén Mazzina Guiñazú (Spanish pronunciation: [xiˈmena aʝeˈlem maˈsina ɣiɲaˈsu]; born 7 September 1989) is an Argentine political scientist and politician who served as the country's Minister of Women, Genders and Diversity from 2022 to 2023, in the cabinet of President Alberto Fernández.

She previously served as Secretary of Women, Diversity and Equality of San Luis Province, under Governor Alberto Rodríguez Saá, from 2019 to 2022, and as a member of the San Luis City Council. Mazzina belongs to the Justicialist Party.

== Career ==
In the 2019 general election, Mazzina ran for one of San Luis's two seats in the National Chamber of Deputies as part of the Frente de Todos list; she was the second candidate, behind Carlos Ybrhain Ponce. The Frente de Todos list received 43.87% of the vote and came second, not enough for Mazzina to be elected. She had previously served as a member of the San Luis City Council and as a member of the Justicialist Party national congress representing San Luis.

Mazzina was appointed as Secretary of Women, Diversity and Equality in the provincial government of San Luis on 12 December 2019 by governor Alberto Rodríguez Saá. As secretary, she was in charge of organising the 35th Plurinational Encounter of Women, Lesbians, Trans-Travestis, Bisexuals, Intersexuals and Non-binary people in Huarpe, Comechingón and Ranquel territory. She also led the efforts to reform San Luis' provincial electoral law to follow the gender parity law adopted at the federal level in 2017.

In October 2022, following the resignation of Elizabeth Gómez Alcorta as Minister of Women, Genders and Diversity of Argentina, president Alberto Fernández appointed Mazzina as minister in her stead. It was one of three changes made in the cabinet that same day, alongside Kelly Olmos (appointed as labour minister) and Victoria Tolosa Paz (social development minister). At 33, she became the youngest cabinet minister at the time, as well as the first openly lesbian cabinet minister of Argentina.

== Personal life ==
Mazzina has a professorship degree in political science from the Universidad de La Punta (ULP); she is also a magister student on public policy administration at the Catholic University of Córdoba.

She is a lesbian. She prefers to be referred to by her nickname, "La Aye".

Political offices
Preceded by Elizabeth Gómez Alcorta	Minister of Women, Genders and Diversity; 2022–2023	Office abolished
