= Elizabeth Gómez Alcorta =

Argentine lawyer, professor and politician

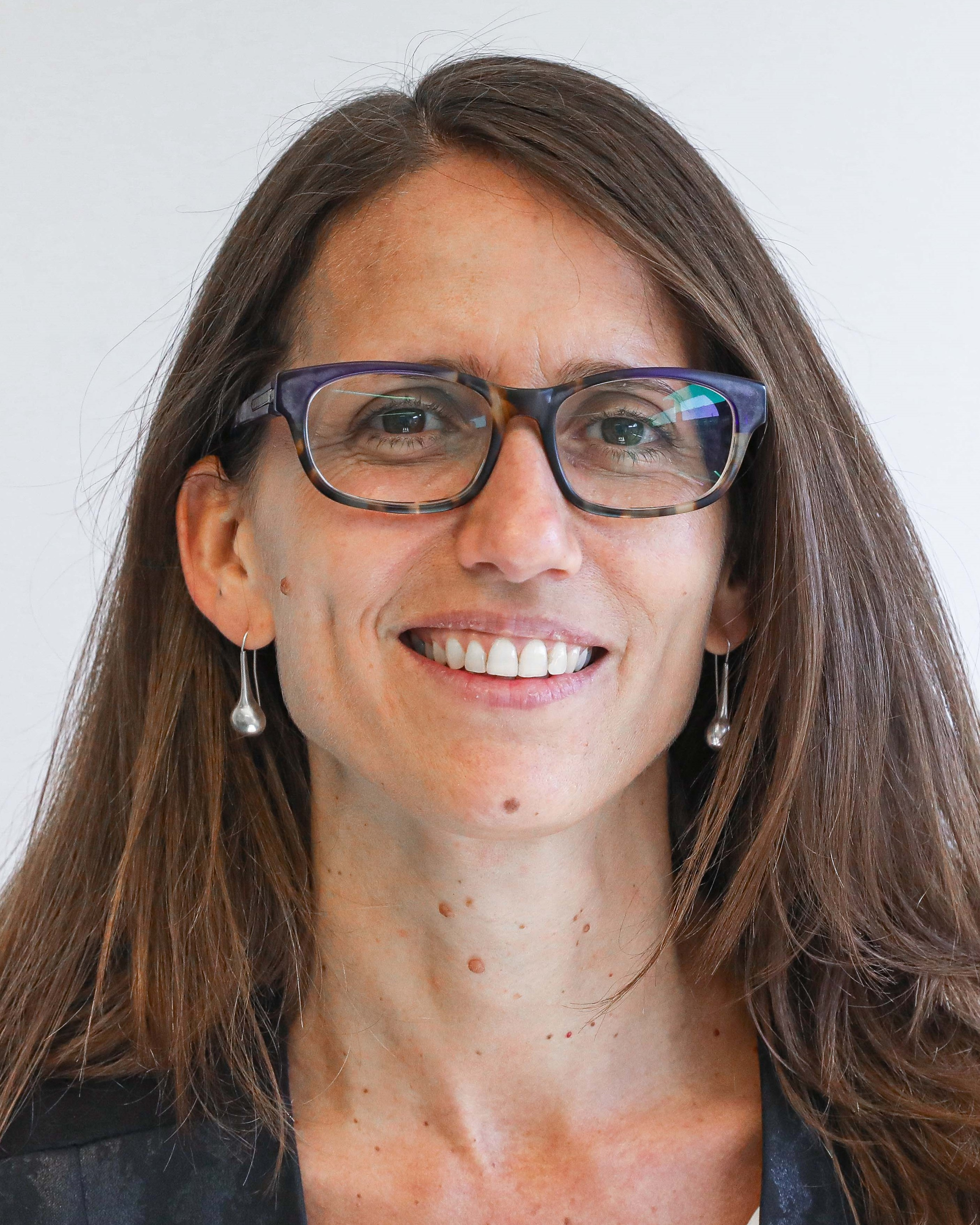

Minister of Women, Genders and Diversity
- In office 10 December 2019 – 7 October 2022
- President: Alberto Fernández
- Preceded by: Position established
- Succeeded by: Ayelén Mazzina

Personal details
- Born: 18 November 1972 (age 53) San Isidro, Buenos Aires, Argentina
- Party: Patria Grande Front; Frente de Todos (since 2019)
- Education: University of Buenos Aires

Elizabeth Victoria Gómez Alcorta (Spanish pronunciation: [eˈlisaβet βikˈtoɾja ˈɣomes alˈkoɾta]; born 18 November 1972) is an Argentine lawyer, professor and politician. She was the first Minister of Women, Genders and Diversity of Argentina, serving under President Alberto Fernández from 10 December 2019 to 7 October 2022.

She rose to prominence in 2016 as the attorney of activist and social leader Milagro Sala.

== Early life and career ==
Gómez Alcorta was born in San Isidro, in the suburbs of the Greater Buenos Aires, in 1982. She studied law at the University of Buenos Aires Faculty of Law, graduating in 1997 with honors; she is the first university graduate in her family. She is a member of the Centro de Estudios Legales y Sociales (CELS), and worked in the Justice Ministry and the Council of Magistracy, where she became involved in judicial matters pertaining to victims of state-sponsored terrorism during the last military dictatorship (1976–1983). Additionally, she has been a faculty of the UBA Faculty of Law, her alma mater.

She rose to prominence in 2016 as the defending attorney of activist and social leader Milagro Sala, who stands accused of embezzlement. According to Gómez Alcorta, Sala was "sentenced for being a woman", and the charges against her constitute a "witch-hunt never seen before in the democratic era"; she maintains Sala is a political prisoner.

Gómez Alcorta is a member of Mala Junta, a "feminist, popular, mixed and dissident" collective organized within the Patria Grande Front. She is a vocal supporter of the legalization of abortion in Argentina.

== Ministry of Women, Genders and Diversity ==
Ahead of the 2019 general election, then-presidential candidate Alberto Fernández announced his intention of creating of a new government ministry dedicated to overseeing public policies pertaining to women's issues, especially the issue of gender-based violence against women. Gómez Alcorta was touted by Fernández and vice-presidential candidate Cristina Fernández de Kirchner to head the new ministry ahead of the Frente de Todos ticket's victory in the 2019 election.

Under Gómez Alcorta's vision, the new ministry was subdivided into two secretariats, one dedicated to designing and implementing policies to mitigate gender-based violence against women, and another tasked with implementing policies related to equality and gender and sexual diversity. Gómez Alcorta has stated that the ministry's ultimate goal is "to mainstream and federalize gender policies across the Government's administration".

On 31 December 2019, Fernández announced that he would send a bill in 2020 to discuss the legalisation of abortion, ratified his support for its approval, and expressed his wish for "sensible debate". However, in June 2020, he stated that he was "attending to more urgent matters" (referring to the COVID-19 pandemic, as well as the debt restructuring), and that "he'll send the bill at some point". In November 2020, legal secretary Vilma Ibarra, confirmed that the government would be sending a new bill for the legalisation of abortion to the National Congress that month. The Executive sent the bill, alongside another bill oriented towards women's health care (the "1000 Days Plan"), on 17 November 2020. The bill was passed by the Senate on 30 December 2020, and received presidential assent on 14 January 2021, effectively legalising abortion in Argentina.

=== Gender-based violence ===
In July 2020, Gómez Alcorta presented a $ 18,000 million-national plan against gender-based violence projected for the 2020-2022 period, aimed at reducing extreme violence, ensuring economic autonomy for victims of gender-based violence and seizing cultural and structural aspects. The plan establishes 15 points of action, including the establishment of comprehensive territorial centers, a revamp of the 144 gender violence emergency line, and economic help for women and LGBT+ people at risk.

In 2022 she signed an agreement with the Inter-American Commission on Human Rights (CIDH) concerning the case of Octavio Romero and Gabriel Gersbach who were a couple in Argentina, until Romero was murdered. It was agreed that the murder had not been investigated properly and this was because the couple were gay.

=== LGBT+ rights ===
On 4 September 2020, President Fernández signed Decreto 721/2020, which established a 1% employment quota for trans and travesti people in the national public sector. The measure had been previously debated in the Chamber of Deputies as various prospective bills. The decree mandates that at any given point, at least 1% of all public sector workers in the national government must be transgender, as understood in the 2012 Gender Identity Law. The initiative had previously been proposed by Argentine trans and travesti activists such as Diana Sacayán, whose efforts led to the promotion of such laws at the provincial level in Buenos Aires Province in 2015.

On 25 June 2021, the Argentine Senate passed a law mandating the continuity of Decreto 721/2020. The new law, called Promoción del Acceso al Empleo Formal para personas Travestis, Transexuales y Transgénero "Diana Sacayán - Lohana Berkins" ("Promotion of Access to Formal Employment for Travesti, Transsexual and Transgender People Diana Sacayán - Lohana Berkins"), also establishes economic incentives for businesses in the private sector that employ travesti and trans workers, and gives priority in credit lines to trans-owned small businesses.

On 20 July 2021, Fernández signed Decreto 476/2021, mandating the National Registry of Persons (RENAPER) to allow a third gender option on all national identity cards and passports, marked as an "X". The measure applies to non-citizen permanent residents who possess Argentine identity cards as well. In compliance with the 2012 Gender Identity Law, this made Argentina one of the few countries in the world to legally recognize non-binary gender on all official documentation. The 2022 national census, carried out less than a year after the resolution was implemented, counted 56,793 (roughly 0.12%) of the country's population identifying with the "X / other" gender marker.

=== Resignation ===
Gómez Alcorta resigned on 6 October 2022 in protest of the government's eviction of a group of Mapuche people (including several women, some of them pregnant, and children) in the Lafken Winkul Mapu community in Villa Mascardi, Río Negro. Fernández accepted Gómez Alcorta's resignation the following day.

Political offices
Preceded by New position	Minister of Women, Genders and Diversity; 2019–2022	Succeeded by Ayelén Mazzina
