= Jorge Ferraresi =

Argentine politician

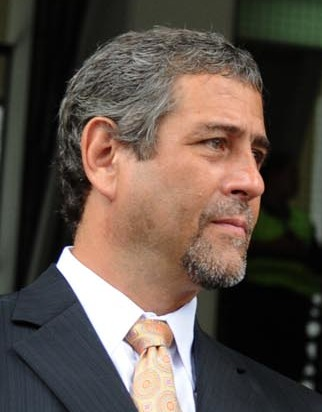

Mayor of Avellaneda
- In office 1 November 2022 – 3 July 2026
- Preceded by: Alejo Chornobroff
- Succeeded by: Magdalena Sierra
- In office 3 August 2009 – 11 November 2020
- Preceded by: Baldomero Álvarez de Olivera
- Succeeded by: Alejo Chornobroff

Minister of Territorial Development and Habitat
- In office 11 November 2020 – 1 November 2022
- President: Alberto Fernández
- Preceded by: María Eugenia Bielsa
- Succeeded by: Santiago Maggiotti

Personal details
- Born: 26 August 1961 (age 65) Buenos Aires, Argentina
- Party: Justicialist Party
- Other political affiliations: Front for Victory (2003–2017); Citizen's Unity (2017–2019); Frente de Todos (since 2019)
- Spouse: Magdalena Sierra
- Education: National Technological University

Jorge Horacio Ferraresi (Spanish pronunciation: [ˈxoɾxe oˈɾasjo feraˈɾesi]; born 26 August 1961) is an Argentine Justicialist Party politician and engineer. He was intendente (mayor) of Avellaneda, a partido in the Greater Buenos Aires metropolitan area. He served uninterruptedly from 2009 to 2020, when he was appointed as Minister of Territorial Development and Habitat in the cabinet of President Alberto Fernández, and later resumed the position in 2022.

== Early life and education ==
Jorge Horacio Ferraresi was born on 26 August 1961 in Buenos Aires, the son of Alfredo Ferraresi, a farmaceutical union leader and co-founder of the CGTA. He studied construction engineering at the National Technological University (UTN), graduating in 1988, and then went on to attain a labor engineering degree from the same university in 1990.

== Political career ==
Ferraresi's career started as the security chief at Garrahan Hospital, in Buenos Aires, where he worked until 1991. From there he went on to serve as Secretary of Public Works and Services at the municipality of Avellaneda from 1991 to 2001 and again from 2003 to 2009; this latter term under intendente Baldomero Álvarez de Olivera.

In 2007, he ran for the Avellaneda municipal council as the first candidate in the Front for Victory list, and was elected. Upon Álvarez de Olivera's resignation to assume a post in the provincial cabinet of Daniel Scioli, Ferraresi became interim mayor of Avellaneda in 2009. He was formally elected to the post in 2011, and was re-elected by wide margins in 2015 and 2019. His administration in the municipality was characterized by the prominence of public works, especially in the affordable housing sector.

Since 2016 he has served as Vice president of Patria institute, a think tank founded by former president Cristina Fernández de Kirchner; Ferraresi is considered to be a close associate of Fernández de Kirchner.

In 2020, following the resignation of María Eugenia Bielsa as Minister of Territorial Development and Habitat, Ferraresi was touted as a potential successor and eventually confirmed to the post on 11 November 2020. He was succeeded in the municipality by his chief of staff, Alejandro Chornobroff.

In October 2022, Ferraresi announced he would step down as minister in order to return to his post as mayor of Avellaneda, as he had not resigned but rather taken a leave of absence. He was succeeded by Santiago Maggiotti on 1 November 2022, the same day Ferraresi resumed his office as mayor of Avellaneda.

== Personal life ==
Ferraresi is married to Magdalena Sierra, a fellow Justicialist Party politician who was National Deputy representing Buenos Aires Province from 2017 to 2021. Ferraresi has three children.

Political offices
Preceded by Baldomero Álvarez de Olivera	Mayor of Avellaneda; 2009–2020	Succeeded by Alejo Chornobroff
Preceded by María Eugenia Bielsa	Minister of Territorial Development and Habitat; 2020–2022	Succeeded by Santiago Maggiotti
Preceded by Alejo Chornobroff	Mayor of Avellaneda; 2022–2026	Succeeded by Magdalena Sierra
