= Secretariat of Territorial Development, Habitat and Housing =

Former ministry of the Argentine government

- Secretaría de Desarrollo Territorial, Hábitat y Vivienda
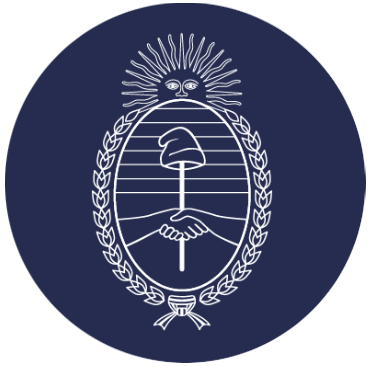

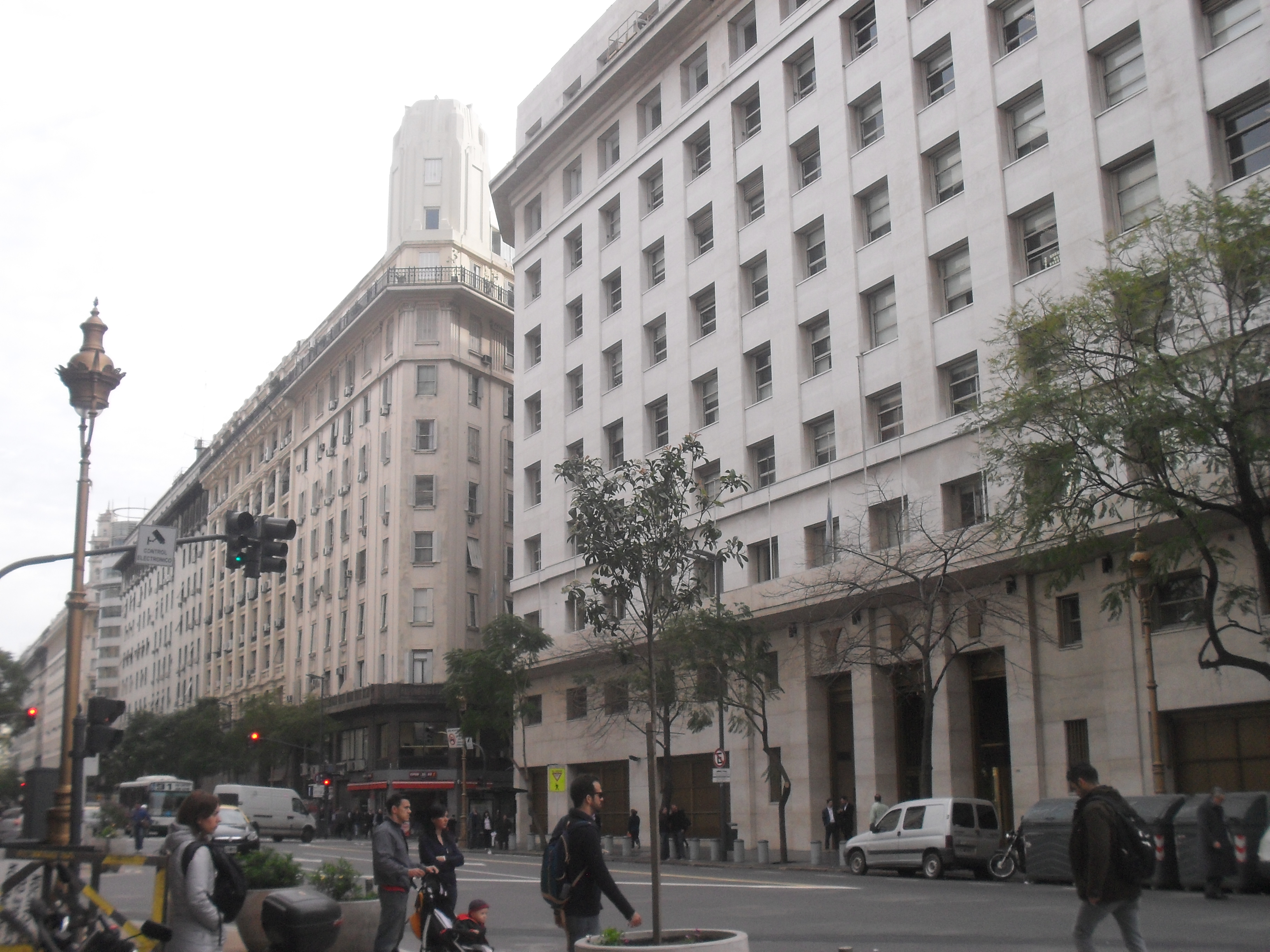
- YPF building in Buenos Aires, headquarters

Secretariat overview
- Formed: 2019; 7 years ago
- Preceding Secretariat: Ministry of the Interior, Public Works and Housing
- Superseding Secretariat: Ministry of Economy
- Jurisdiction: Government of Argentina
- Headquarters: YPF building, Buenos Aires
- Secretariat executive: Rodrigo Aybar, Secretary
- Website: argentina.gob.ar/habitat

The Secretariat of Territorial Development, Habitat and Housing (Spanish: Secretaría de Desarrollo Territorial, Hábitat y Vivienda) of Argentina is a secretariat and former ministry of the national executive power that oversees and defined the Argentine state's policies on housing and habitat.

The ministry was created in 2019, as one of the initial measures of President Alberto Fernández, elevating the housing and territorial development areas of the Ministry of the Interior, Public Works and Housing.

The ministry was dissolved and turned into a secretariat following a presidential decree from President Javier Milei in December 2023. The agency is under the supervision of the Ministry of Economy.

== Attributions ==
The attributions and responsibilities of the then Ministry of Territorial Development and Habitat were specified in Article 23 decies of the Law of Ministries (Ley de Ministerios), published in 2019. This law stated that the ministry exists since housing is a right, as well as a necessity for the wellbeing of the population. In this vein, the Ministry was in charge of intervening in the elaboration of public policy oriented towards the development of habitat, housing and socio-urban integration, whilst attending to the diversities, demands and ways of inhabiting that manifest across the territory of Argentina.

=== Structure and dependencies ===
The Ministry of Territorial Development and Habitat counted with a number of centralized dependencies reporting to it. The centralized dependencies, as in other government ministers, are known as secretariats (secretarías) and undersecretariats (subsecretarías); there are currently four of these:

- Secretariat of Habitat (Secretaría de Hábitat)
  - Undersecretariat of Housing Policies and Infrastructure
- Secretariat of Socio-urban Integration (Secretaría de Integración Socio-Urbana)
  - Undersecretariat of Neighbourhood Lands and Services Administration
- Secretariat of Territorial Development (Secretaría de Desarrollo Territorial)
  - Undersecretariat of Land Policy and Urbanism (Subecretaría de Política de Suelo y Urbanismo)
- Secretariat of Coordination (Secretaría de Coordinación)
  - Administrative Undersecretariat (Subsecretaría Administrativa)
  - Legal Undersecretariat (Subsecretaría Legal)

No decentralized agencies currently report to the Ministry of Territorial Development and Habitat.

== Headquarters ==
The Secretariat of Territorial Development and Habitat is headquartered in the eighth floor of the YPF Building (address Esmeralda 255), located in the Monserrat barrio in Buenos Aires. The office building, completed in 1938, was originally designed to be the headquarters of Yacimientos Petrolíferos Fiscales (YPF), which it was until 2008 when it moved to its current offices in Puerto Madero.

== List of ministers and secretariats ==
No.	Minister	Party	Term	President
1	María Eugenia Bielsa	PJ	10 December 2019 – 11 November 2020	Alberto Fernández
2	Jorge Ferraresi	PJ	11 November 2020 – 1 November 2022	Alberto Fernández
3	Santiago Maggiotti	PJ	1 November 2022 – 10 December 2023	Alberto Fernández
4	Rodrigo Aybar	LLA	March 2024 –	Javier Milei
