= Navarro, Buenos Aires =

Navarro
- Location in Argentina
- Coordinates: 35°01′S 59°16′W
- Country: Argentina
- Province: Buenos Aires
- Partido: Navarro
- Founded: October 25, 1864
- Elevation: 31 m (102 ft)

Population (2001 census [INDEC])
  - Total: 11,562
- CPA Base: B 6605
- Area code: +54 2272

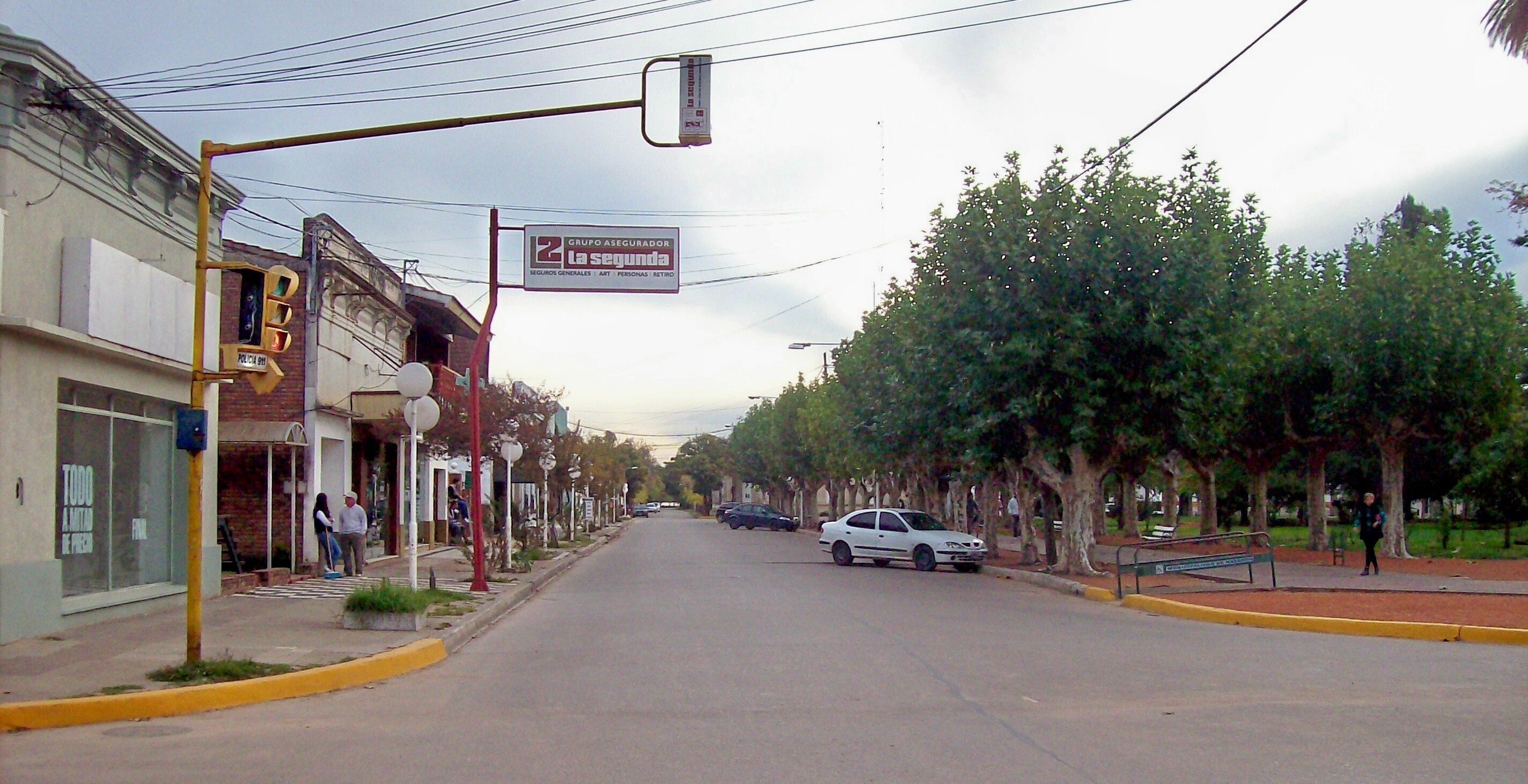
Town center

Navarro is a town in Buenos Aires Province, Argentina. It is the county seat of Navarro Partido.
