= Government of Argentina =

- Gobierno de Argentina
- Coat of arms
- Formation: 1810; 216 years ago
- Founding document: Constitution
- Jurisdiction: Argentina
- Website: casarosada.gob.ar

Legislative branch
- Legislature: National Congress
- Meeting place: Palace of the Congress

Executive branch
- Leader: President
- Headquarters: Casa Rosada
- Main organ: Cabinet of Ministers
- Departments: 8

Judicial branch
- Court: Supreme Court
- Seat: Palace of Justice

The government of Argentina (Spanish: Gobierno de la República Argentina), within the framework of a federal system, is a presidential representative democratic republic. The president of Argentina is both head of state and head of government. Executive power is exercised by the president. Legislative power is vested in the National Congress. The Judiciary is independent from the Executive and from the Legislature, and is vested in the Supreme Court and the lower national tribunals. From the own government is also called Presidency of the Nation (Spanish: Presidencia de la Nación).

== Executive branch ==
The current composition of the executive branch includes solely the president, who is the head of state and is formally given the power over the administration to follow through with the interests of the nation. The president is also the chief of the Argentine Armed Forces.

The president and the vice president are elected through universal suffrage by the nation. The constitutional reform of 1994 introduced a two-round system, more popularly known in the country as ballotage, by which the winning presidential ticket has to receive either more than 45% of the overall valid votes, or at least 40% of it and a 10% lead over the runner-up. In any other case, the two leading tickets get to face a second round whose victor will be decided by a simple majority. This mechanism was not necessary in the 1995 election, when it could have first come into use, nor in the ones in 1999, 2007, 2011, and 2019. However, it was instrumental in the selection of Néstor Kirchner in 2003, of Mauricio Macri in 2015, and, most recently, of Javier Milei in 2023.

The cabinet of ministers is appointed by the president, but is not technically part of the executive power. The vice president belongs to the legislative branch, since they also hold the presidency of the senate.

=== Current presidency ===
Portfolio	Incumbent	Since	Party	Coalition
President	Javier Milei	10 December 2023	Libertarian Party	Freedom Advances
Vice President	Victoria Villarruel	10 December 2023	Democratic Party	Freedom Advances

=== Current ministries ===
As of July 2025:

Portfolio	Incumbent	Since	Party	Coalition
Chief of the Cabinet of Ministers	Guillermo Francos	28 May 2024	Independent	Freedom Advances
Ministry of Foreign Affairs, International Trade and Worship	Gerardo Werthein	October 2024	Independent	
Ministry of Defense	Luis Petri	10 December 2023	Radical Civic Union	Together for Change
Ministry of Economy	Luis Caputo	10 December 2023	Republican Proposal	Together for Change
Ministry of Justice	Mariano Cúneo Libarona	10 December 2023	Independent	
Ministry of Security	Patricia Bullrich	10 December 2023	Republican Proposal	Together for Change
Ministry of Health	Mario Lugones	26 September 2024	Independent	
Ministry of Human Capital	Sandra Pettovello	10 December 2023	Union of the Democratic Centre	Freedom Advances
Ministry of Deregulation and State Transformation	Federico Sturzenegger	5 July 2024	Union of the Democratic Centre	Freedom Advances

== Legislative branch ==
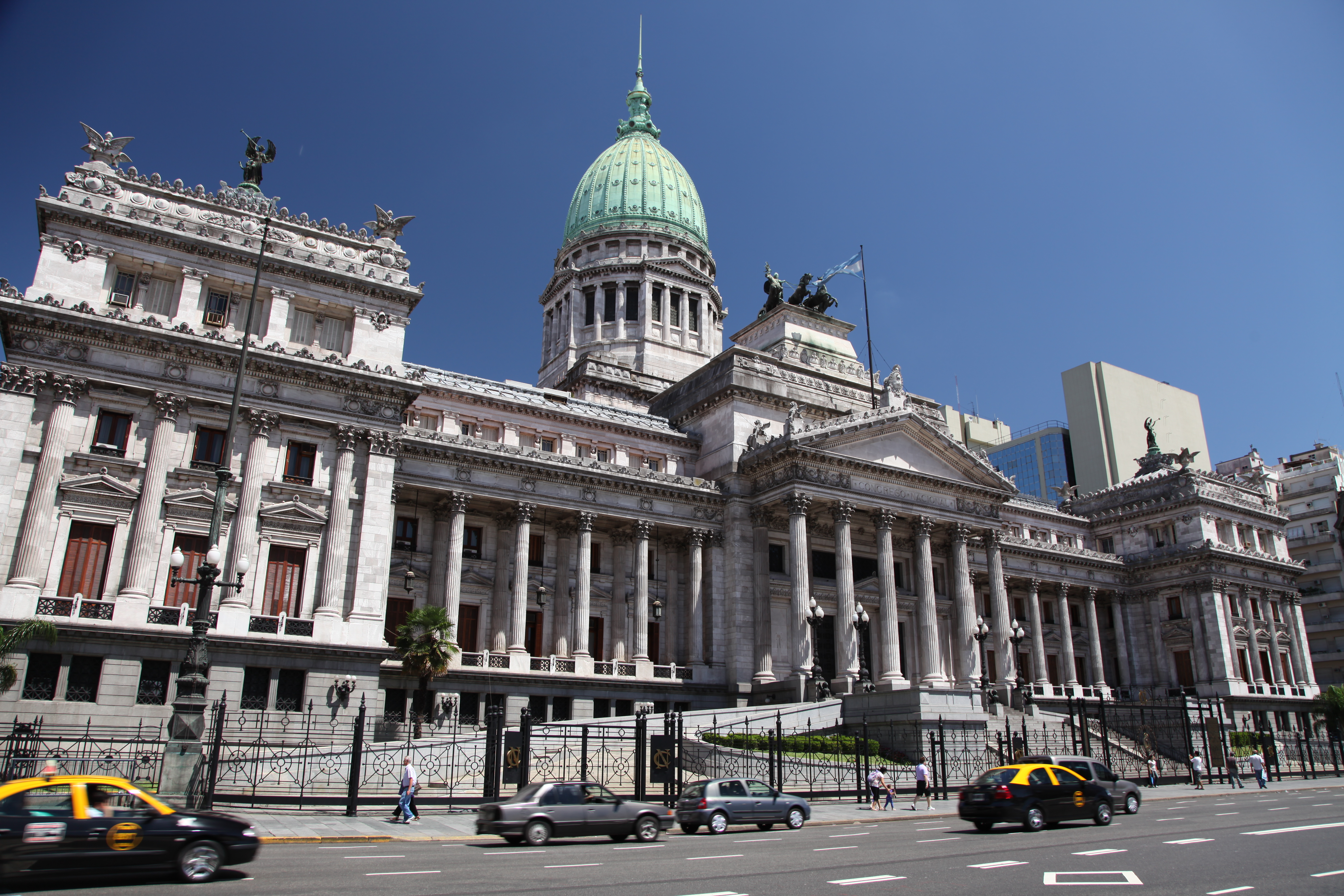
Palace of the Argentine National Congress, seat of the Legislature

The National Congress (Spanish: Congreso Nacional) constitutes the legislative branch of government. The Congress consists of the Senate (72 seats), presided by the Vice-President of the Nation, and the Chamber of Deputies (257 seats), currently presided by Julián Domínguez, deputy for Buenos Aires province. Senators stay in office for six years, and deputies, for four.

Each of the Provinces and the Autonomous City of Buenos Aires elect deputies and senators directly. Deputies are representatives of the whole people of the Nation, while Senators represent their districts. Each district elects a number of deputies roughly proportional to their overall population by proportional representation, and three senators: two for the majority, and one for the first minority. Members of both chambers are allowed indefinite re-elections.

Every two years, each of the 24 electoral districts (the twenty-three Provinces and the Autonomous City of Buenos Aires) elects one half of their lower chamber representatives. Districts with an odd number of Deputies elect one more or one fewer of them on each election. As for the Senators, the twenty-four districts are divided into three groups consisting of eight districts. Every two years all eight districts of one of those groups elect all their three senators, assigning two of them from the party that obtains the majority, and one from the first minority party. Six years later, the same group of districts will hold its next senatorial elections.

== Judiciary branch ==
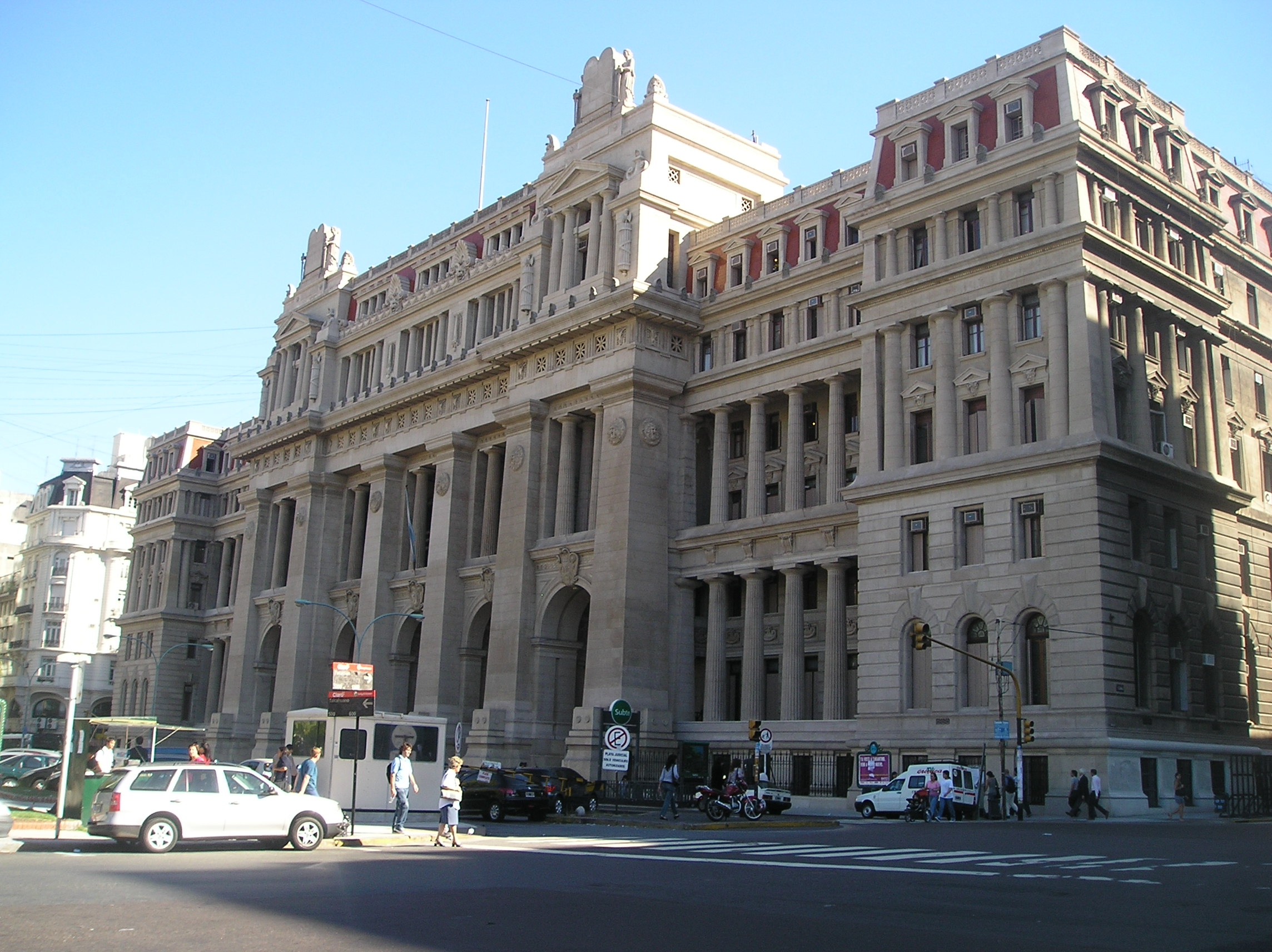
Main building of the Argentine Supreme Court

The Judiciary Branch is composed of federal judges and others with different jurisdictions and of a Supreme Court with nine members (one President, one Vice President, and seven Ministers), appointed by the President with approval of the Senate, who may be deposed by Congress. As of December 2015 there are six vacancies, which then President Kirchner stated she did not intend to fill.

- President of the Supreme Court: Dr. Horacio Rosatti
- Vice-President of the Supreme Court: Dr. Carlos Rosenkrantz
- Minister of the Court: Dr. Juan Carlos Maqueda
- Minister of the Court: Dr. Ricardo Lorenzetti

== Provincial and municipal governments ==
Argentina is divided into 23 districts called Provinces and one autonomous district, which hosts the national capital, the Autonomous City of Buenos Aires (which is conurbated into the province of Buenos Aires). Each of the provinces has its own constitution, laws, authorities, form of government, etc., though these must first and foremost comply with the national constitution and laws.

The government of each province has three branches. The Executive, Legislative and Judiciary. The Executive branch is led by a governor. The Legislative Branch may be organized as a unicameral or a bicameral system, i.e:, with either one or two chambers or houses; currently, eight of the 24 provinces has a bicameral legislature.

Each province, except for Buenos Aires Province, is divided into districts called departments (departamentos). Departments are merely administrative divisions; they do not have governing structures or authorities of their own. They are in turn divided into municipalities (cities, towns and villages). Each province has its own naming conventions and government systems for different kinds of municipalities. For example, Córdoba Province has municipios (cities) and comunas (towns); Santa Fe Province further distinguishes between first- and second- tier municipios; Chaco Province refers to every populated center as municipios, in three categories.

The Province of Buenos Aires has a different system. Its territory is divided into 134 districts called partidos, each of which usually contains several cities and towns.

Regardless of the province, each department/partido has a head town (cabecera), often though not necessarily the largest urban center, and in some provinces often named the same as their parent district.

Municipalities are ruled by mayors, usually called Intendant (intendente) in the case of cities and towns (the larger categories). A city has a legislative body called the Deliberative Council (Concejo Deliberante). The smaller towns have simpler systems, often ruled by commissions presided by a communal president (presidente communal) or a similarly named authority.

Buenos Aires city, seat of the National Government, was declared an autonomous city by the 1994 constitutional reform. Its mayor, formerly chosen by the President of the Republic, is now elected by the people, and receives the title of Chief of Government (Jefe de Gobierno). Other than that, Buenos Aires, as the provinces, has its own Legislative Branch (a unicameral Legislature) and elect deputies and senators as representatives to the National Congress.
