= Antonio Bermejo =

Argentine politician and judge (1853–1929)

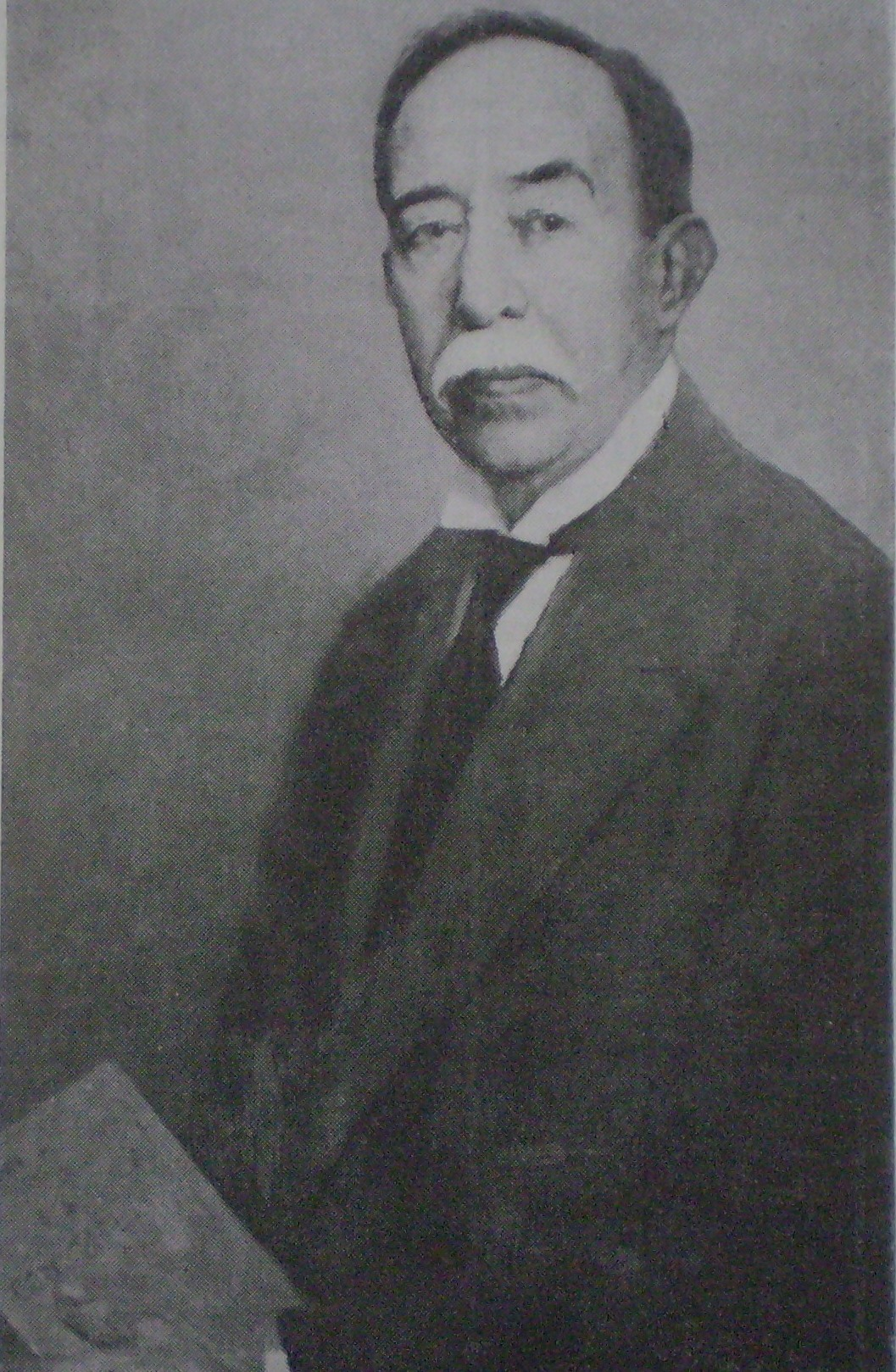
Bermejo in 1864

Antonio Bermejo (2 February 1853 – 19 October 1929) was an Argentine judge, lawyer and politician. Bermejo, who was born in Chivilcoy, was a lawyer, judge and Argentinian politician, Supreme Court of Argentina judge between 1903 and 1905, and president of the Court from 1905 to his death in Buenos Aires.

He was the longest-serving judge in the Court with 26 years and 4 months until 21 May 2010, date in which the judges Carlos Fayt and Enrique Santiago Petracchi surpassed him.

== Biography ==
Antonio Bermejo was Antonio Bermejo's son. The father was a Spanish immigrant from Málaga who established himself in Chivilcoy in 1843. He carried out important governmental tasks and rented a small farm where he devoted himself to farming and other agricultural activities.

His son, the prospective judge, studied at the National School of Buenos Aires, where he would later be teacher of philosophy and mathematics. He attended the University of Buenos Aires, where he obtained the degree of Doctor in Jurisprudence in 1876. In 1879, he was elected representative of the Buenos Aires City Legislature. In the 1880s, he worked as a lawyer and teacher of international law.

In 1891 he returned to politics and won a seat in the Senate of the Nation representing the Province of Buenos Aires. In 1893, he ran as Governor of Buenos Aires and between 1895 and 1897 he was Minister of Justice and Public Instruction. During his tenure as minister, he founded an industrial school, a commercial school for women which bears his name: Escuela de Comercio N°2 "Dr. Antonio Bermejo, the Museo Nacional de Bellas Artes, and he presided over the establishment of the School of Philosophy and Letters of the University of Buenos Aires.

Between 1898 and 1902, while serving as a Congress representative, he was appointed by the president of the Nation Julio Argentino Roca to participate in the Panamerican Conference held in Mexico in 1901.

On 19 June 1903, he was nominated minister of the Supreme Court of Justice of the Argentinian Nation by president Roca and in 1905 became its president and served in that office until his death.

He died in Buenos Aires on 19 October 1929, aged 76.
