= Manuel García-Mansilla =

Argentine lawyer and legal scholar

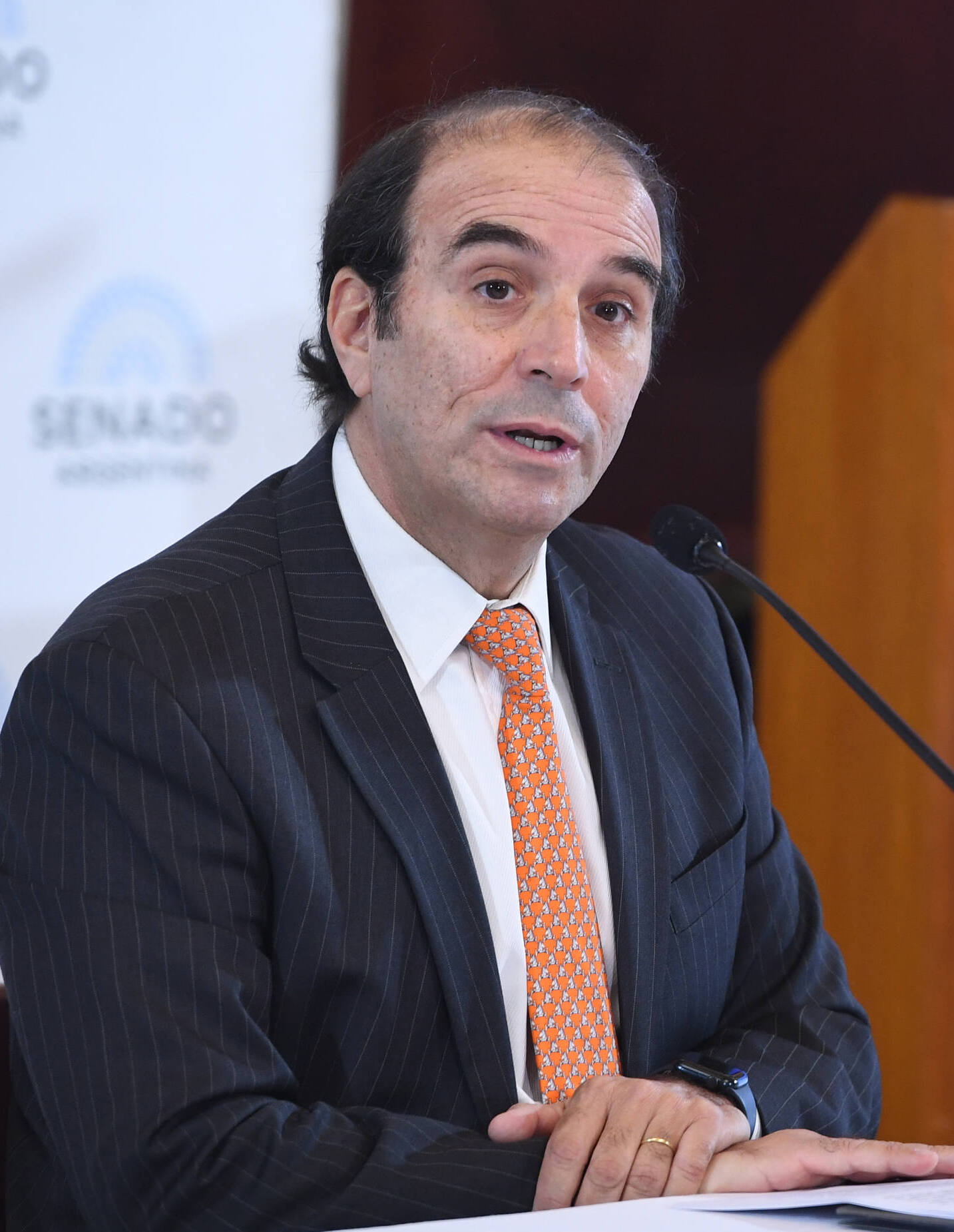

Minister of the Supreme Court
- In office 27 February 2025 – 7 April 2025
- Nominated by: Javier Milei
- Preceded by: Juan Carlos Maqueda

Personal details
- Born: 6 May 1970 (age 56) Bariloche, Río Negro, Argentina
- Education: Universidad del Salvador, Georgetown University, Austral University (JSD)

Manuel García-Mansilla (born 6 May 1970) is an Argentine lawyer and legal scholar who served as Minister of the Supreme Court of Justice of Argentina for 40 days from 27 February to 7 April 2025. Directly appointed to the Court by President Javier Milei, his nomination was rejected by the Senate on 4 April 2025, following an extensive controversy on the legality of his appointment.

He has been described as one of Argentina's most prominent legal scholars.

== Education ==
García-Mansilla graduated from Universidad del Salvador, Argentina, with a Bachelor of Laws degree. He also obtained a Master of Laws degree from Georgetown University, writing a thesis titled “The Crisis of the Separation of Powers: The Case of Argentina”, in which he argued that one of the country’s major issues is the executive branch’s use of Emergency Decrees to bypass Congress.

== Career ==
García-Mansilla began practicing law in 1996, and has worked at several prestigious Argentine law firms. Between 2005 and 2010, he was involved in the gas and oil industry, working for Vintage Oil Argentina Inc. and Occidental Argentina Exploration and Production Inc. After four years at another law firm, he became executive director of the Hydrocarbon Exploration and Production Chamber (CEPH) in 2014, representing companies in Argentina’s oil and gas sector.

He has also served as Dean of the Faculty of Law at Universidad Austral since 2019. In 2024, he earned a doctorate from the same institution, with Supreme Court Vice President Carlos Rosenkrantz as one of the jurors who evaluated his thesis.

In 2024, García-Mansilla was nominated by President Javier Milei to fill the vacancy left by Minister Juan Carlos Maqueda. On 4 April 2025 he was rejected by the Senate, receiving 51 votes against and 21 in favor. The primary reason was the majority of senators disapproval of appointment by decree to the Supreme Court.

== Personal life ==
García-Mansilla was born on 6 May 1970, in San Carlos de Bariloche. He is 53 years old, married, and has three children. In 2018, he spoke out against legal abortion.
