= Murder of Micaela Ortega =

2016 death of a child in Argentina

Micaela Ortega
- Born: August 4, 2003
- Died: April 24, 2016 (aged 12); Bahia Blanca, Argentina
- Cause of death: Strangulation
- Known for: Child murder victim

The murder of Micaela "Mica" Ortega was a child murder that occurred in Bahia Blanca, Argentina, and which led to the law known as "the Mica Ortega law", which deals with grooming, by adults, of children, for sexual purposes, in that country.

== Micaela Ortega ==
Micaela Ortega (2003/2004–approx. 23 April 2016) was a 12-year old Argentine girl, who was a resident of Bahia Blanca. Her mother's name is Monica Cid. Shortly before Ortega's death, Ortega had befriended a person named Jonathan Luna, using the social networking site Facebook.

Luna lived in a small house without many economical resources. However, Luna had a computer and had access to Facebook, utilizing four different accounts, which Luna used to contact minor females to befriend them and entice them, posing as a woman.

On the night of her disappearance, Ortega left her house at Noroeste barrio in Bahia Blanca, thinking she was going to meet another 12-year-old girl. After meeting Luna, Micaela walked a distance with them until they arrived at a desolate spot, where Luna tried to rape her and then killed her. Luna had picked her up at her house, having lied to her before and told her that Luna was driving her towards her supposed friend's house.

== Perpetrator ==
Jonathan Luna (born in 1989 or 1990, not to be confused with United States Attorney General Jonathan Luna) was once convicted of aggravated robbery. Luna was given a furlough, during which they took the opportunity to escape.

Police were unable to locate Luna until the murder took place. Luna later declared herself to be transgender and was moved to a transgender-specific hall at penal unit 32 in Florencio Varela.

== Search ==
Ortega's disappearance garnered national attention in Argentina. One month after it took place, newspapers and television were covering it, in hopes of finding her alive.

Her dead body was found on 28 May 2016 in a desolate area of Ingeniero White barrio in Bahia Blanca. She was found with her hands tied behind her back. She had been beaten and strangled.

After her body was found, local citizens marched to Luna's house, burning it down.

== Investigation ==
Luna confessed to killing Ortega and took police officers to where Luna had placed her body.

== Trial ==
Luna was tried in court for child sexual grooming, and, in a historical moment for Argentine justice, became the first person in the country to be convicted of those charges in October 2017. Luna was sentenced to life in prison.

Luna's public defendant, Ana Julia Biasotti, presented a motion in court to have Luna's sentence vacated because the defense had been denied a motion to take the case to Argentina's supreme court and instead the trial was decided by the Bahia Blanca province's court. But the motion was denied on 5 July 2023 by judges Ricardo Lorenzetti, Horacio Rosatti and Juan Carlos Maqueda.

== Mica's law ==
Mica's law, named after Ortega, is law #27,590 of the Argentine legal code. It declares that social networking sites in Argentina must tell minors about the dangers of using those sites with a warning once they get on them.
