= Elena Highton de Nolasco =

Argentine judge

Elena Nolasco
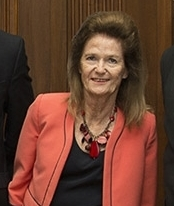

Minister of the Supreme Court
- In office 9 June 2004 – 1 November 2021
- Nominated by: Néstor Kirchner
- Preceded by: Eduardo Moliné O'Connor

Vice President of the Supreme Court
- In office 1 September 2005 – 1 October 2021
- Preceded by: Augusto Belluscio
- Succeeded by: Carlos Rosenkrantz

Personal details
- Born: Elena Inés Highton; 7 December 1942 (age 83) Lomas de Zamora, Argentina
- Spouse: Alberto Mario Nolasco
- Education: University of Buenos Aires
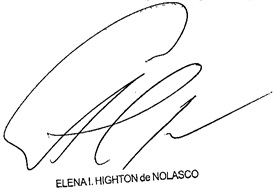
- Signature

Elena Inés Highton de Nolasco (born 7 December 1942) is an Argentine lawyer, judge and a former member of Supreme Court of Justice of Argentina, having served from 2004 to 2021.

Mrs. Nolasco was born in Lomas de Zamora in Buenos Aires Province. She qualified as a lawyer, procurator and notary in 1966 at the University of Buenos Aires (UBA). Her postgraduate studies were at UBA, Harvard Law School and the University of Nevada. From 1967 she practised as a lawyer and in 1973 she became an official defence lawyer for incapable defendants. In 1979 she became a judge, joining the national Appeals Court in 1994. She taught extensively particularly at UBA, and has written several books largely on civil law.

In June 2004, Nolasco joined the Supreme Court. She was the first woman to join the Court (under a democratic government), although Carmen Argibay's appointment had been announced earlier. When it came to Senate approval, 51 of the senators present voted for her appointment and five were against. In August 2005 she was appointed vice-president of the Court.

The International Association of Women Judges (IAWJ) awarded her Human Rights Award during a conference held in Seoul on 18 May 2010.

Elena and her husband Alberto Mario Nolasco have two sons.
