= Juan Maqueda =

Juan Maqueda may refer to:

- Juan José Maqueda (born 1969), Spanish footballer and manager
- Juan Carlos Maqueda (born 1949), Argentine lawyer, politician and judge
