= Supreme Court of Justice of the Nation =

Supreme Court of Justice of the Nation is the formal name of two national supreme courts:

- the Supreme Court of Mexico; and
- the Supreme Court of Argentina
