= Carmen Argibay =

Argentine judge (1939–2014)

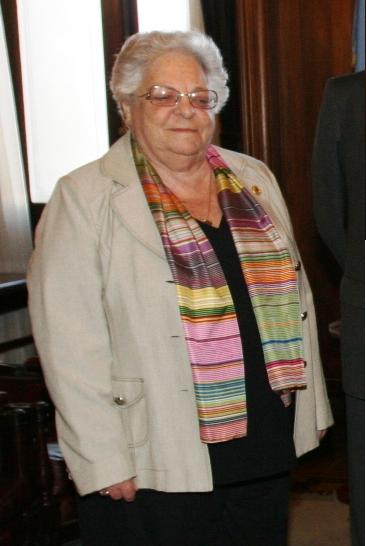
- Carmen Argibay

Judge of the Supreme Court
- In office 3 February 2005 – 10 May 2014
- Nominated by: Néstor Kirchner
- Preceded by: Guillermo López
- Succeeded by: Vacant (seat abolished)

Judge of the International Criminal Tribunal for the former Yugoslavia
- In office 5 November 2002 – 18 January 2005

Personal details
- Born: 15 June 1939 Buenos Aires, Argentina
- Died: 10 May 2014 (aged 74) Buenos Aires, Argentina
- Education: University of Buenos Aires

Carmen María Argibay (15 June 1939 – 10 May 2014) was a member of the Supreme Court of Argentina. She was the first woman to be nominated for the Court by a democratic government in Argentina, and caused some controversy upon declaring herself an atheist and a supporter of legal abortion.

== Early life ==
Born in Buenos Aires, Argibay studied at the Law Faculty of the University of Buenos Aires, becoming a lawyer on 11 June 1964.

She worked in a number of public judicial offices and taught in several universities, until 1976. On 24 March of that year, a coup d'état started the dictatorship of the National Reorganization Process. The military junta had her arrested, without formal charges, and held her in prison until December. After being released she devoted herself to private law practice.

After the return of democratic rule, on 7 June 1984, she was appointed judge in a criminal court in Buenos Aires. She was promoted in 1988 and again in 1993, and finally retired from her post on 1 January 2002.

Argibay is a member of the International Association of Penal Law, and a founding member of the International Association of Women Judges, over which she presided from 1998 to 2000. She also founded the Association of Women Judges of Argentina.

She took part as a judge in the Women’s International War Crimes Tribunal on Japan’s Military Sexual Slavery, which gathered in December 2000 to try Japanese military for war crimes, particularly on the issue of "comfort women".

In June 2001 she was appointed ad litem judge at the International Criminal Tribunal for the former Yugoslavia (ICTY).

== Nomination to the Supreme Court ==
Argibay was one of the first Justices who entered the Argentine Supreme Court when President Néstor Kirchner started to push for its renewal. She was proposed by the President, for the consideration of professional circles and of the public at large, on 30 December 2003. The Senate approved her designation on 7 July 2004. She became a member of the Court on 3 February 2005, once she was able to step down from her duties at the ICTY. She was the first woman ever nominated by a democratic government for a post of the highest court of law of Argentina (Elena Highton, the second, was nominated afterwards, but entered the Court earlier).

Argibay's nomination met resistance from some sectors of society, particularly conservative sectors of the Roman Catholic Church, after she went on record stating that she was (politically) "more left than right", a "militant atheist", and supported "the right of women to decide about their own bodies". Many Argentines are religious, and 85% are nominally Roman Catholic; abortion was illegal at that time in Argentina in most cases.

When the nomination was made public, a number of conservative voices criticized her for her atheism and her stance on abortion; a Catholic organization complained that Argibay, who is single and childless, was "not representative of Argentine women." To these criticisms, Argibay replied, "I believe that saying up front who one is or what one thinks is an indication of honesty, which is the first step towards impartiality. My beliefs, or lack thereof, should not interfere in the judicial decisions I take."

Argibay was awarded the 2007 Gruber Prize for Justice (shared with Chilean judge Carlos Cerda and Peruvian lawyer Mónica Feria Tinta) for her promotion of gender equality and eliminating corruption within the justice system.

She died on 10 May 2014 after suffering respiratory, cardiac and intestinal problems.
