= Abel Bazán =

Argentine politician and jurist

Abel Bazán (23 December 1833 – 24 October 1903) was an Argentine politician and jurist born in La Rioja, Argentina, who studied law at the National University of Córdoba and was titled Doctor of Jurisprudence.

Bazán became a politician in La Rioja Province, serving as minister of government under the governorship of Colonel Domingo Antonio Villafañe, then in the Argentine Senate from 1864 until 1880 and as provincial deputy in the constituent convention of 1898.

As a judge, Bazán was most prominent. He worked in Santa Fe Province and Córdoba. In 1890, he was appointed to the supreme court by President of Argentina Miguel Juárez Celman. In 1903, shortly before dying at age 69, president Julio Argentino Roca appointed him President of the Supreme Court.
