= Ricardo Lorenzetti =

Argentine judge

Ricardo Luis Lorenzetti
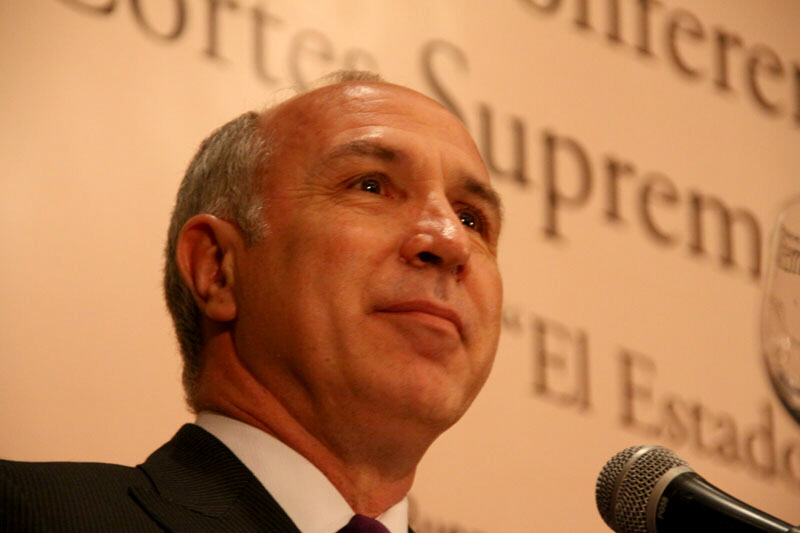

President of the Supreme Court
- In office 1 January 2007 – 1 October 2018
- Nominated by: Néstor Kirchner
- Preceded by: Enrique Petracchi
- Succeeded by: Carlos Rosenkrantz

Minister of the Supreme Court
- Incumbent
- Assumed office 12 December 2004
- Nominated by: Néstor Kirchner
- Preceded by: Adolfo Vázquez

Personal details
- Born: 19 September 1955 (age 71) Rafaela, Santa Fe, Argentina
- Education: National University of the Littoral (LLB, JSD)

Ricardo Luis Lorenzetti (born 19 September 1955) is an Argentine judge graduated from the National University of the Littoral, Argentina, with a long national and international career. He used to be Chief Justice of the Supreme Court of Argentina (2007–2018), proposed by President Néstor Kirchner and approved by the Senate, assuming his position on December 12, 2004, covering the vacancy caused by the resignation of Justice Adolfo Vázquez. On November 7, 2006, he was appointed Chief Justice, officiated as of January 1, 2007. Currently, he is one of the five Justices of the Supreme Court. He was President of the commission for the preparation of the Parliamentary Act to reform, update and unify the Civil and Commercial Codes of the Argentine Nation, Presidential Decree 191/2011.

In addition, during his presidency, the Court was very innovative due to its take on class actions and also due to the implementation of several institutional devices such as CIJ, a news agency dedicated to the Judiciary's transparency. Also, the Court developed and installed spaces aimed to gender protection (Oficina de violencia doméstica, y Oficina de la Mujer) .

A statement by UCR figure and former Mar del Plata Mayor Daniel Katz in support of a potential spot for Lorenzetti as Julio Cobos's running mate in the 2011 presidential election led to friction with the administration of President Cristina Kirchner, whose Cabinet Chief, Aníbal Fernández, expressed disapproval at Lorenzetti's silence on the issue.

On 23 June 2013, Lorenzetti claimed that he was being threatened and extorted by AFIP President Ricardo Echegaray. Lorenzetti claims the intimidation was in response to his verdicts against the constitutionality of government legislation. AFIP has denied any such investigation.

Since 2020, Lorenzetti has been serving as an Ex-Officio and Institutional Board Member for the Inter-American Institute on Justice and Sustainability (IIJS) in the city of Washington, D.C., in United States of America where the organization has its headquarters.

== University degrees ==
He graduated as Lawyer from the Department of Legal and Social Sciences of the National University of the Littoral of Santa Fe, Argentina. He joined that institution as a student in 1974, and his degree was issued in July 1978. He is a Doctor in Legal and Social Sciences, whose degree was issued by the Department of Legal and Social Sciences of the National University of the Littoral. The jury of his doctoral dissertation was integrated by María Josefa Méndez Costa, Anteo Ramella, Maurino Elida and his sponsorship was in charge of Jorge Mosset Iturraspe. The title was granted on December 22, 1983, and the title of his doctoral dissertation was Medical Liability of Physicians, published in 1986 by Rubinzal and Culzoni.

== Academic background, awards and distinctions ==
- Member of the Governing Committee of the Global Judicial Institute on the Environment
- Member of the experts group of the Governing Council of the International Institute for the Unification of Private Law (UNIDROIT) 2009–2013
- Chairman of the commission for the preparation of the reform, update and unification of the Civil and Commercial Codes of Argentina
- Goodwill Ambassador for Environmental Justice in the Americas, Organization of American States (OAS), 2016
- Member of the Environmental Justice Commission of the Ibero-American Judicial Summit
- Co-president of the International Advisory Council for the Advancement of Justice, Governance and Law for Environmental Sustainability, United Nations Environment Programme, UN
- Member of the Steering Committee of IUCN -International Union for the Conservation of Nature
- Grand Officer, Order of the Star of Italian Solidarity, honour conferred by the Italian government
- B'nai B'rith Human Rights Award 2010, awarded by B'nai B'rith Argentina, Buenos Aires, 23 November 2010
- Corresponding Member of the National Academy of Social Sciences and Law of Córdoba, Argentina
- Member of the Academy of Law of Peru
- Member of the International Academy of Comparative Law, Paris, France
- Co-director ad-honorem of the Centre for Interdisciplinary Studies in Neuroscience and Law, Secretariat of International Relations of the University of Buenos Aires, together with Dr Facundo Francisco Manes
- Member of the ‘Comitato straniero di Valutazione’, Doctorate in Consumer Law of the University of Perugia, 2017
- Tenure Professor of Civil and Commercial Contracts at the University of Buenos Aires
- Doctor Honoris Causa, National University of Cuyo, Mendoza, Argentina
- Doctor Honoris Causa, National University of La Matanza, Buenos Aires, Argentina
- Doctor Honoris Causa, Catholic University of Salta, Argentina
- Doctor Honoris Causa, University of Morón, Argentina
- Doctor Honoris Causa, Siglo XXI University, Córdoba, Argentina
- Doctor Honoris Causa, Federal University of Rio Grande do Sul, Brazil, May 12, 2014
- Doctor Honoris Causa, Department of Law and Social Sciences, University of Mendoza, Argentina
- Doctor Honoris Causa, Federal University of Porto Alegre, Brazil
- Doctor Honoris Causa, National University of the South, Bahía Blanca, Argentina
- Doctor Honoris Causa, National University of Córdoba, Argentina
- Doctor Honoris Causa, University of Jujuy, Argentina
- Doctor Honoris Causa, National University of Tucumán, San Miguel del Tucumán, Argentina
- Doctor Honoris Causa, National University of the North-East, Resistencia, Chaco, Argentina
- Doctor Honoris Causa, National University of the Littoral, Santa Fe, Argentina
- Doctor Honoris Causa, University of Lima, Peru
- Doctor Honoris Causa, Garcilaso de la Vega University, Lima, Peru
- Doctor Honoris Causa, National University of Cajamarca, Peru
- Honoris Causa, Private University of San Pedro de Trujillo, Peru
- Distinction Honorary Professor, Private University of the North of Lima, Peru
- Distinction Honorary Professor, Department of Law and Political Science, Garcilaso de la Vega Inca University, Peru
- Honour of Merit, Great National University of San Marcos, Peru
- National Award for Freedom of Expression, granted by Editorial Perfil, Buenos Aires, October 22, 2014
- Award from the Buenos Aires National Academy of Law and Social Sciences for the paper “Las Normas Fundamentales de Derecho Privado” [´Fundamental Principles of Private Law´]
- Award in Civil Law from the Córdoba National Academy of Law and Social Sciences, 1993
- Academic Merit Award granted by the National Autonomous University of Mexico Department of Law, October, 2004
- He has developed an intense academic activity in post-graduate courses. He directs the career in Environmental Law, the post-graduate Specialisation in Tort Law and the Programme in Commercial Contracts at University of Buenos Aires. Before being appointed to the Supreme Court of Argentina, he taught post-graduate courses at the following universities: University of Palermo, Austral University, Social and Administration Sciences University, National University of Littoral, Catholic University of Rosario, National University of Tucumán and University of Mendoza
- In Europe, he has given lectures at various universities, such as the University of Salamanca, the Università degli Studi di Roma “Tor Vergata”, and the European Institute of Firenze
- In the United States, he has given lectures at the University of Columbia, Yale, NYU and the American Law Institute
- In Brazil, he has given lectures at the following universities: University of São Paulo, University of Porto Alegre, University of Curitiba, University of Belho Horizonte, University of Rio de Janeiro; he has participated in diverse meetings in almost all the Brazilian states, and six of his books have been translated into Portuguese and published by Revista dos Tribunais –some of them with a second edition-
- In Chile, he has given lectures at the following universities: Catholic University, University of Chile, University of Valparaíso, University of the Andes; and he was the Course Convener in the MA in Private Law at the Catholic University of Valparaiso
- In Mexico, he has given lectures at the Autonomous University of México, the National School and the Mexican Centre of Uniform Law, and he has published two books
- In Uruguay, he has given several lectures and he is professor emeritus at University of the Republic
- In Peru, he has published five books and received several awards. Recently, a conference in his honour has been held
- In Hawai, he participated as a speaker at the Second Global Symposium, organized by the Global Judicial Institute on the Environment (GJIE), the World Commission on Environmental Law (WCEL) of the International Union for the Conservation of Nature (IUCN), the General Secretariat of the Organization of American States (OAS), UN Environment Programme (UNEP), and the Environmental Law Institute (ELI).

== Books ==
His main publications are:

- 2019 Teoría del Derecho ambiental, in collaboration with Pablo Lorenzetti. This book has been published in Colombia .
- 2019 Principios e instituciones de Derecho ambiental”, in collaboration with Pablo Lorenzetti. Madrid, Wolters Kluwer España S.A.
- 2018 Derecho Ambiental, in collaboration with Pablo Lorenzetti, Santa Fe, Editorial Rubinzal-Culzoni Editores.
- 2018 Tratado de los Contratos - Parte General: Third edition plus the Civil Code. Santa Fe: Rubinzal-Culzoni Editores.
- 2017 Justicia Colectiva: Segunda Edición ampliada y actualizada Buenos Aires: Rubinzal Culzoni Editores
- 2016 Fundamentos de Derecho Privado. Código Civil y Comercial de la Nación Argentina (published in Argentina and Uruguay)
- 2015 The Art of Making Justice. The intimacy of the most difficult cases of the Supreme Court of Argentina, Madrid: Thomson Reuters (published in Spanish, English and Portuguese in Argentina, Spain, United Kingdom, Germany, Portugal, France, Brazil, Colombia, Mexico, Paraguay and Chile)
- 2014 Código Civil y Comercial de la Nación Comentado, Buenos Aires: Rubinzal y Culzoni Editores
- 2013 Colección Máximos Precedentes – Corte Suprema de Justicia de la Nación, Responsabilidad Civil, Director: Ricardo L Lorenzetti, Buenos Aires: Editorial La Ley
- 2012 ‘Conflictos colectivos’ chapter in: El Derecho en movimiento, Buenos Aires: Rubinzal y Culzoni Editores
- 2011 La empresa médica, 2nd edition, Buenos Aires: Rubinzal Culzoni Editores
- 2011 Derechos humanos: justicia y reparación, Buenos Aires: Ed. Sudamericana
- 2010 Justicia Colectiva, Buenos Aires: Rubinzal
- 2009 Consumidores, 2nd edition, Buenos Aires: Rubinzal
- 2008 Teoría del Derecho Ambiental, Buenos Aires: La Ley 2008 (published in Argentina, Brazil, México and Spain)
- 2005 Teoría de la decisión judicial – Fundamentos de derecho, Buenos Aires: Rubinzal 2005. (published in Argentina, Brasil, Perú, México and Colombia)
- 2005 Contratos de servicios a los consumidores, Buenos Aires: Editorial Rubinzal y Culzoni
- 2002 La emergencia económica y los contratos, Buenos Aires: Editorial Rubinzal y Culzoni
- 2001 Tratado de los contratos-Parte general, 2nd edition, Buenos Aires: Editorial Rubinzal y Culzoni
- 2001 Las normas fundamentales de derecho privado, Buenos Aires: Rubinzal (published in Argentina, Brazil and Peru)
- 2001 Comercio electrónico, Buenos Aires: Abeledo Perrot (published in Argentina and Brazil)
- 2000 Tratado de los contratos-Parte especial, Buenos Aires: Editorial Rubinzal y Culzoni
- 1998 La empresa médica, Santa Fe: Editorial Rubinzal y Culzoni
- 1997 Responsabilidad civil del médico, Santa Fe: Editorial Rubinzal-Culzoni
- 1993 Responsabilidad por daños derivados de los accidentes de trabajo, Buenos Aires: Editorial Abeledo Perrot
- 1993 La responsabilidad professional, Buenos Aires: Editorial Abeledo Perrot
- 1993 Defensa del consumidor -LEY 24.240-, Santa Fe: Editorial Rubinzal y Culzoni
- 1991 Contratos médicos, Buenos Aires: Editorial Larroca
- 1988 Convenciones colectivas de trabajo, Santa Fe: Editorial Rubinzal y Culzoni
- 1986 Responsabilidad civil del médico, Santa Fe: Editorial Rubinzal y Culzoni

He has dictated more than one thousand lectures and published more than 30 books in Argentina and abroad, as well as more than 300 articles in specialised publications.

== His work in the Supreme Court of Argentina ==
- He established criteria to focus the Court's causes on issues of institutional relevance, adopting for the first time in history the system of public hearings.
- He organized the National Conference of Judges, led by the Court and integrated with judges, to promote the adoption of quality management criteria in the judiciary. For those purposes, agreements were signed to make electronic payments through the Bank of the City of Buenos Aires, and progress was made in the same direction with the Bank of the Nation. He formed a special commission with the jurisdiction of social security and the National Insurance of Argentina to computerise and expedite the judgements of pensioners. that brings together the Supreme Court of Argentina, the Provincial Courts, and federal, national and provincial judges throughout the country, with the purpose of establishing state policies based on consensus.
- He established a regime of opening of the Court to the press, making agreements with Adepa, with Fopea, and promoting permanent meetings with all the media to improve transparency and communication. Thus, in 2008, he launched the Judicial Information Centre, the news agency of the Judicial Branch, to allow the community to access judicial information in a clearer and simpler manner.
- For the first time, state policies for the judiciary with ten-year planning were approved.
- He constituted the National Management Commission, led by the Court and integrated with judges, to promote the adoption of quality management criteria in the judiciary. For those purposes, agreements were signed to make electronic payments through the Bank of the City of Buenos Aires, and progress was made in the same direction with the Bank of the Nation. He formed a special commission with the jurisdiction of social security and the National Insurance of Argentina to computerise and expedite the judgements of pensioners.
- He created the Commission for Access to Justice, integrated by judges, to expedite the solution of conflicts by non-judicial means. In that sense, the office of domestic violence was opened.
- He promoted the international opening of the Supreme Court establishing relations with his counterparts in Courts around the world, including the Courts of the G20 countries, the Ibero-American Region, the Americas (OAS) and the Mercosur (Common Market of the South), as well as International Tribunals, such as the International Court of Justice, the Court of Justice of the European Union, the European Court of Human Rights, the Inter-American Court of Human Rights, the Andean Court, the Caribbean Court of Justice, the African Court on Human and People's Rights, etc. )
- He established the tradition of the State Opening of the Judiciary every year since 2008, in order to announce the state policies that will be developed during each year.
- The administration of the Court, the social work, and the forensic medical corps were reorganised with criteria of transparency and audit controls.
- He was one of three judges to ratify the life sentence of Jonathan Luna, accused of the murder of Micaela Ortega.
