= Genaro Carrió =

Argentine jurist and translator

Genaro Rubén Carrió (16 February 1922 - 17 October 1997) was an Argentine jurist and translator. He served as President of the Supreme Court of Argentina between 1983 and 1985 designated by president Raúl Alfonsín.

He graduated at Law at the National University of La Plata in 1944. Then he studied at the Dedman School of Law in Dallas, Texas focused in the Common law.

He worked as a translator to Spanish language of American jurists like Alf Ross and H. L. A. Hart.
