= Palace of Justice of the Argentine Nation =

- Palacio de Justicia de la Nación Argentina
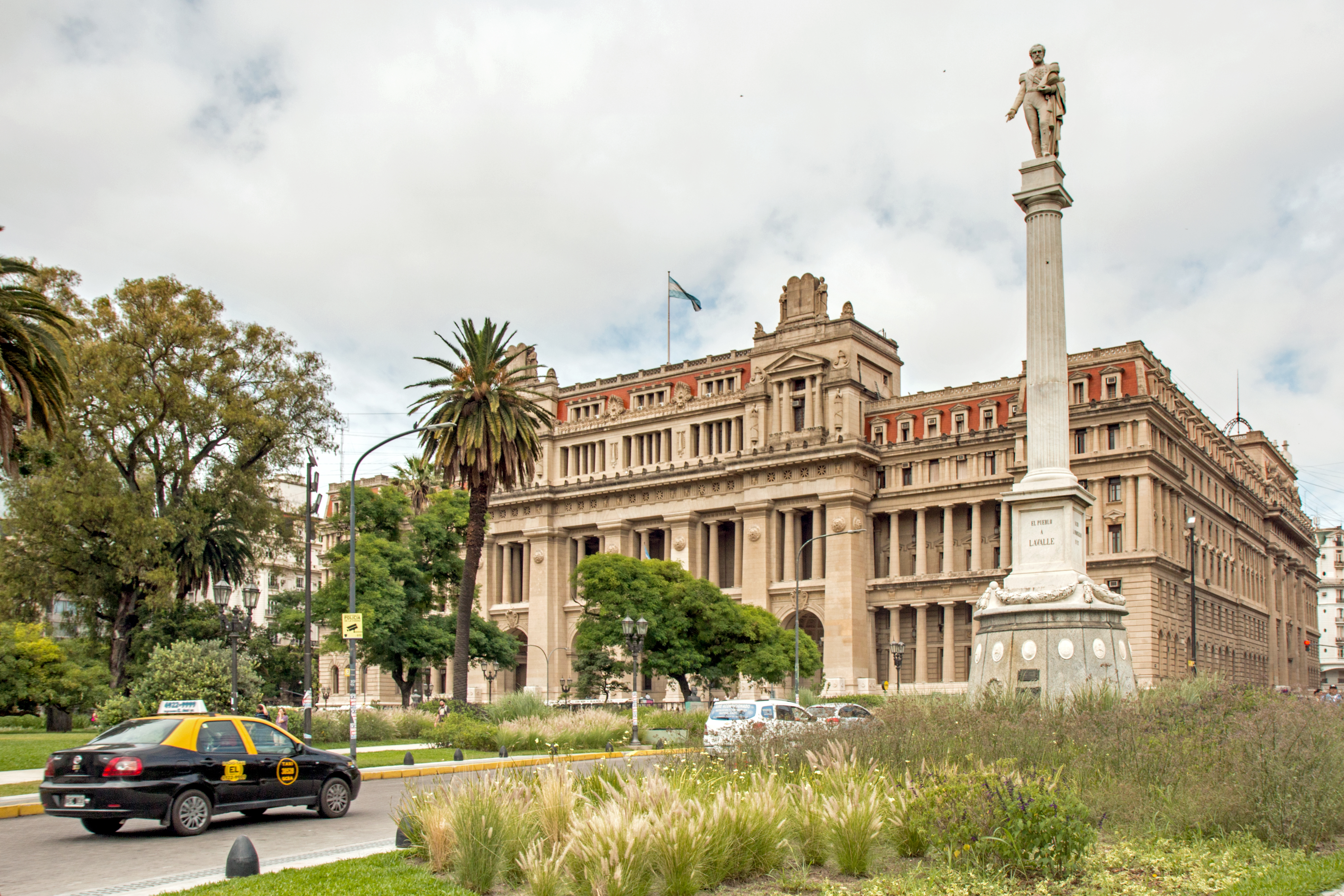
- Aerial view of the main facade
- Interactive map of the Palace of Justice of the Argentine Nation area
- Alternative names: Palacio de Tribunales

General information
- Architectural style: Monumental Neoclassical–Eclectic
- Location: Talcahuano 550, Buenos Aires, Argentina
- Coordinates: 34°36′7.8″S 58°23′8.7″W
- Current tenants: Supreme Court
- Construction started: 1905
- Completed: 1942; 84 years ago
- Inaugurated: 1910
- Cost: m$n 12,832,717.70 (1929)
- Owner: Government of Argentina

Technical details
- Floor count: 8
- Floor area: 60,100 m^{2} (647,000 sq ft)

Design and construction
- Architect: Norbert Maillart

National Historic Monument of Argentina
- Designated: 1999

The Palace of Justice of the Argentine Nation (Spanish: Palacio de Justicia de la Nación Argentina, more often referred locally as Palacio de Justicia or Palacio de Tribunales), is a large building complex located in Buenos Aires, Argentina. It is the seat of the Supreme Court and other lower courts.

Designed in a monumental Eclectic neoclassical style and constructed between 1905 and 1910, the building is a National Historic Landmark and has a total floor area of 60,100 m^{2} (647,000 sq ft).

== History ==
The original building was designed by French architect Norbert Maillart in 1889, during the presidency of Miguel Juárez Celman, but the Baring crisis of 1890 paralyzed the start of construction for almost 20 years. It was only during the second presidency of Julio A. Roca that the project was resumed, with the start of works being approved in 1904 and construction beginning in 1905.

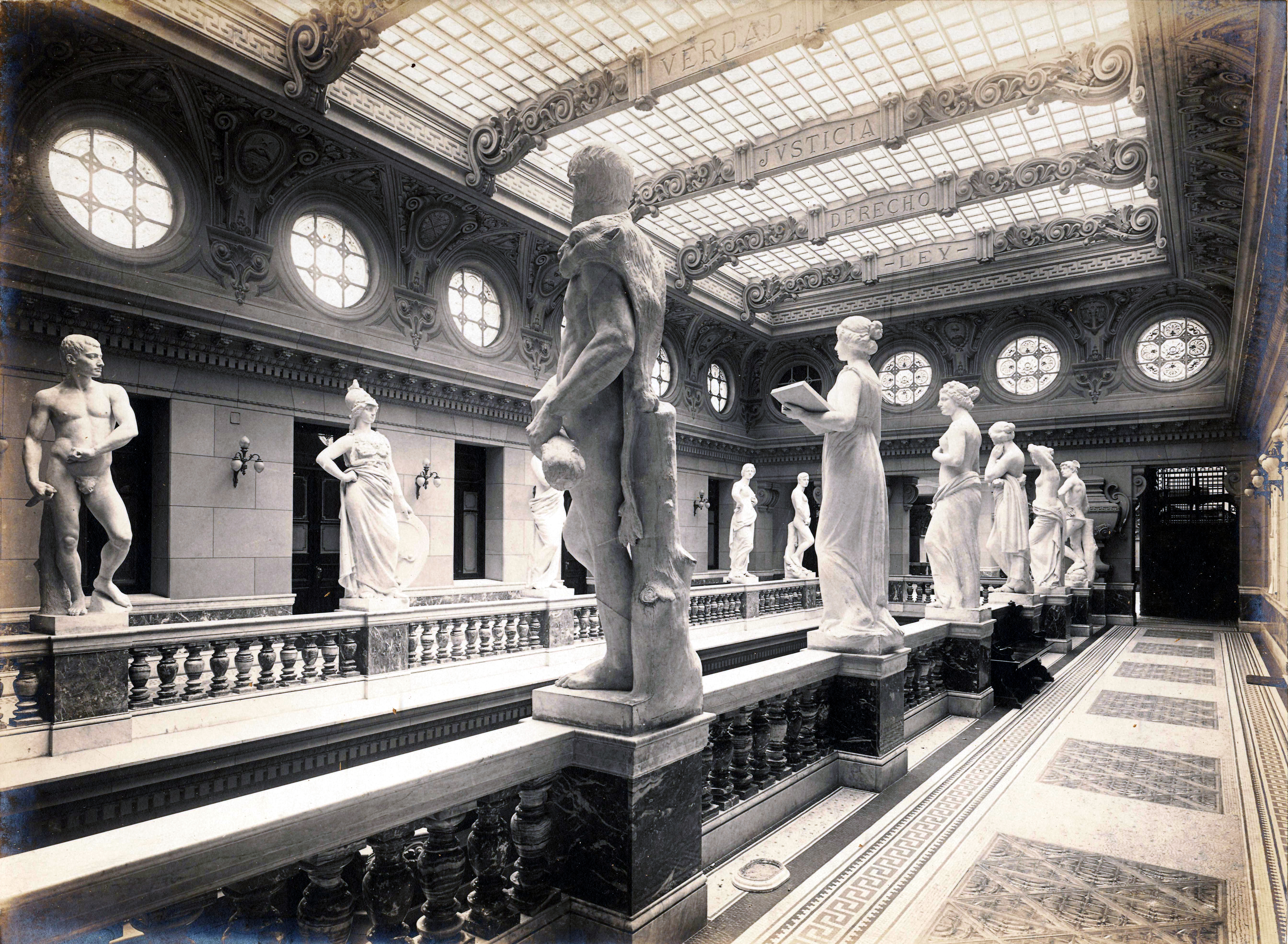
Interior view of the palace c. 1910

A part of the Palace of Justice was inaugurated in 1910 by President José Figueroa Alcorta, during the celebrations for the Centennial of the May Revolution. However, there was still much to be built, and the Supreme Court was installed in the new building only in 1912, at which time Maillart left not only the direction of the work but Argentina. In 1914, while the World War I began and due to administrative and budgetary problems, the work was suspended, only to be resumed in the 1920s.

Around 1925, the original project was modified due to the growth of the Judicial Branch, in such a way that the original top of the building, which included a mansard, gave way to one more floor, gaining the necessary surface area. At that time, the two statues that crown the top and hold the tables of the law were added to the façade. Even so, numerous details were missing from the interiors.

The palace would not be finished until 1942. It was declared National Historic Monument of Argentina in 1999 via decree 349.

== Style ==
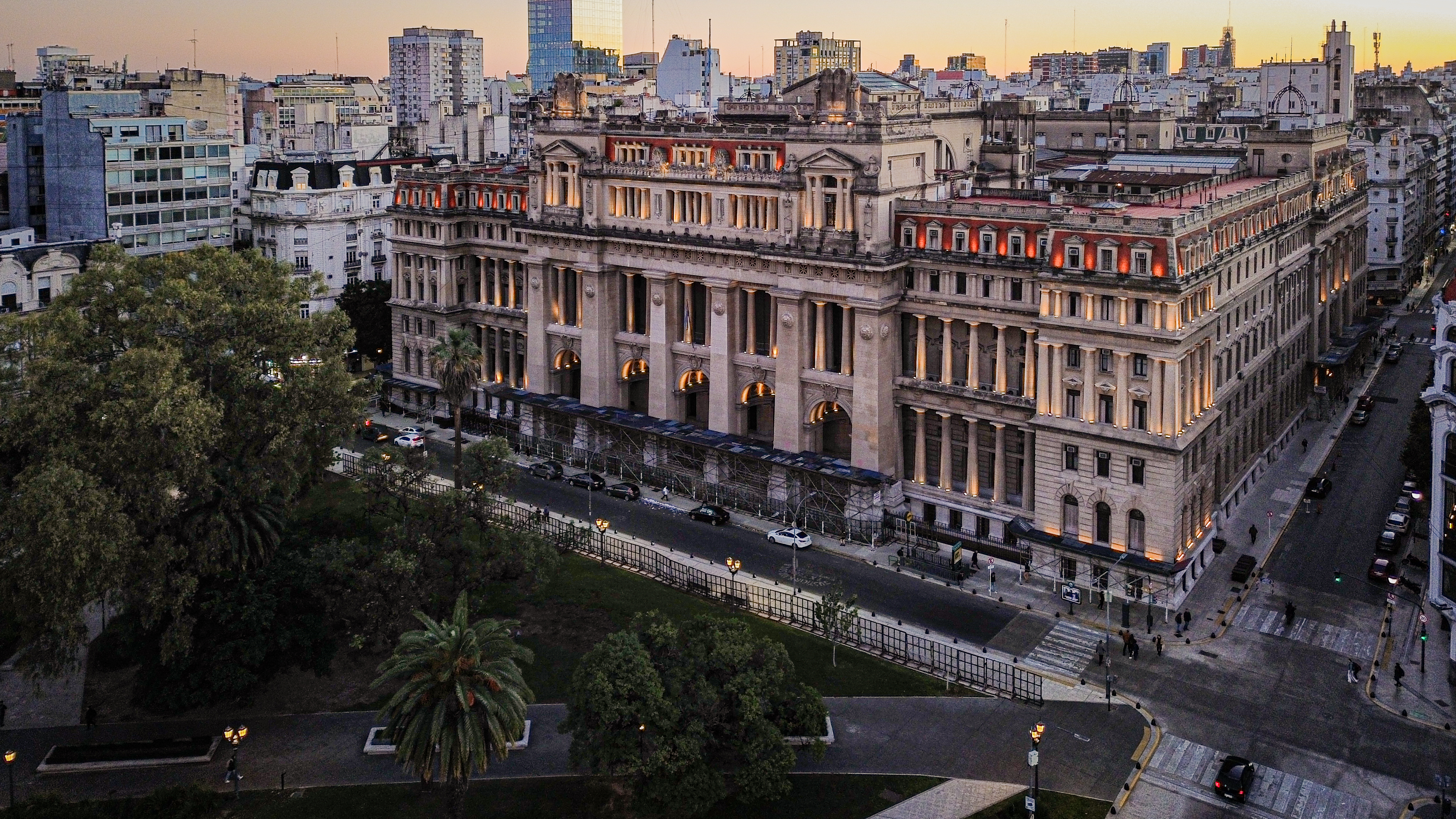
Aerial view of the palace.

Its facades are covered in imitation Paris stone. The building hosts some sculptures in its interior, such as Justice by Rogelio Yrurtia, a bust of José de San Martín by Luis Perlotti, and a replica of the flag of the Andes, designed by San Martín during the battles for the Independence.

The palace's rooms include the "Patio of Honor", a hall where some concerts were held, and the Audience Room of the Supreme Court of Justice. To design the numerous ornaments on the façade, the architect Virginio Colombo arrived from Milan, and he would end up settling in Buenos Aires and becoming a major representative of the art nouveau movement in local architecture.

== In popular culture ==
Many movies have been filmed inside the palace, including:

- Cenizas del paraíso (1997)
- La Nube (1998)
- Derecho de familia (2006)
- El secreto de sus ojos (2009)
- La República recuperada (2009)
- Cómo ganar enemigos (2014)
- Muerte en Buenos Aires (2014)
- El Clan (2015)
- Crímenes de familia (2020)
- Argentina, 1985 (2022)
