= Commercial School Number 2 "Dr. Antonio Bermejo" =

Public secondary school in Buenos Aires, Argentina

The Commercial School Number 2 "Dr. Antonio Bermejo" is a public secondary school in the city of Buenos Aires, Argentina. The school was founded in 1897 as a National Commercial School for women.^{1}

== Location ==
The school opened in Corrientes Avenue 643–645 but was then moved to the following locations in chronological order: Corrientes Avenue 643–445 (until 1906), Bolívar 531, Bolívar 355, Humberto Primo 782 (until 1925), Callao Avenue 628, Juncal 1258 where it operated for 28 years until 14 July 1994. In that year the school occupied the rear side of the building located in Callao Avenue 628 in new premises built with access from Riobamba 623. The facade of the aforementioned location in Callao Avenue 628 together with its palm tree courtyard, the only one that survived out of the three the house originally had, was declared a National Historical Monument by Decree 1946/2012. Thus, the building preserved its features of mid-nineteenth Argentine architecture.^{2}

The School of Commerce Number 2 "Dr. Antonio Bermejo" is located in the historical site, Callao Avenue 628. Its facade is one of the Monuments of the City of Buenos Aires, Argentina^{3}. The school has another entrance in Riobamba 623 – between Tucumán and Viamonte streets in the neighbourhood of Balbanera^{4}.

== History ==
=== Historical context of its creation ===
Domingo Faustino Sarmiento conceived of the elementary public school system to educate the population. Within this framework, he started to create schools of primary education for women. His project gave birth to the "Escuela Normal", whose principal objective was to train prospective Argentinian teachers under the Pestalozzi^{5} method of teaching, a German system that proposes passing from the concrete to the abstract, from the simple to the complex with gradual advances and well-defined objectives.

The "Escuela Normal" gave women access to secondary education and to a profession linked to female work. This period of organization of the Argentine oligarchic regime, known in Argentine history as the Generation of the 80s can be described as a process of consolidation of the modern state in our country. Argentina joined the world market as a producer of raw materials and generated a strong foreign investment in the service sector (transport, expansion of the electrical grid, banking, etc.).

The country would become, as referred to by various historians, as "the granary of the world"^{6} because of its high levels of global crops of wheat, corn, etc., and its exports of stock until the birth of the meat industry. In political terms, the country was undergoing a restricted democracy since there was civil liberty for everybody but political participation for a few. The increase in population with the arrival of massive immigration led to freedom of work, trade and property acquisition but it did not lead to political participation unless citizenship was adopted. Thus, the ruling class maintained the control of the native population while the president chose his successor. At the time, electoral fraud was used to keep power; besides, the Generation of the 80s utilised a mechanism of social control with the advent of hygienism, which affected the development of the Argentine system of education thanks to the 1420^{7} Law, a law that rapidly reduced the national illiteracy rates.

=== Foundation and first years of the Bermejo School ===
Antonio Bermejo was Minister of Justice and Public Instruction under President José Evaristo Uriburu (during the period 1895–1898). During his term in office, he encouraged the creation of the National Museum of Fine Arts^{8}, the School of Philosophy and Letters (University of Buenos Aires), the Industrial School Otto Krause and the National Commercial School for women, which gave women access to the labour market as domestic servants or textile workers. The economic growth of the country generated new employment opportunities in trade and in state administration. This school was founded in 1897 when Bermejo pushed a proposal through Congress to fund a Commercial School for women. Other commercial schools had been created in the country and on 16 February 1905 in order to give them a general organic framework, the Executive Power with Dr. Joaquín V. González as Minister of Public Instruction, issued a decree dividing the existing schools into three categories: High, Middle and Elementary. The School of Commerce for women appertained to the first category. On 28 February 1910, it was renamed High School of Commerce for Women. Subsequently, as requested in writing by the Schools Management to the Minister of Justice and Public Instruction, Dr. Manuel María de Iriondo, the school was given the name of his founder, Dr. Antonio Bermejo. On 3 November 1932, President Agustín P. Justo^{9} sent the confirmation of the requested name to the school headmistress, Zulema M. de Liddle. On 19 October 1933, a bust of Dr. Antonio Bermejo is unveiled with the presence of Dr. Manuel María de Iriondo (President and Minister of the Supreme Court of the Argentine Nation) and the following authorities: Roberto Repetto, Antonio Sagarna, Luis Lima y Celestino Pérez, the president of the National Counsel of Education, Engineer Octavio Sergio Pico, the head of the Military House of the Presidency of Argentina, Colonel José M. Sarobe, and Dr. Bermejo's relatives. Furthermore, commemorative medals were given, including one given to the founder's daughter, Lila Bermejo.

The first headmistress was Eusebia Silveyra de Rojas.^{10} The classes were given in the night shift because the female students worked during the day. Two of its students were Eva Basabilvaso y Leonor Scout de Linay. The students attended school for two years and among the subjects dictated there was Telegraphy which, as stated in the economic history of Argentina, facilitated the communications of the country's agro-export model. The school counted with a school enrolment of 101 female students. The morning shift started in 1905 and the first commercial female students graduated in 1911. The school had a leading national role in training women for commercial work. In 1985 the school inaugurated its first co-educational courses when it began enrolling male students.

== Some of the school outstanding teachers ==
The school was staffed with teachers that had a prominent political, cultural and social role. Among these are:

- Alicia Moreau de Justo (1885–1896): Married to Doctor Juan B Justo; she was one of the first female medical doctors to graduate in Argentina and was also a journalist, and a political leader. She directed the magazine New Humanity and the socialist weekly The Vanguard from 1956 to 1962. She wrote Women in Democracy, Socialism According to Juan B. Justo's Definition and What is Socialism in Argentina? She was a "Dr. José Antonio Bermejo" teacher of Biology and "Merceología", a subject that used to be taught in Argentine secondary schools and whose teaching contents were mainly based on inorganic chemistry.
- Clorinda Matto de Turner: A well-known journalist and Peruvian writer who settled permanently in Buenos Aires. While she published her articles in different journals, she was a teacher at the Commercial School Number 2 "Dr. Antonio Bermejo" until she died in 1909.
- Juan José de Souza Reilly: A journalist whose articles portrayed Buenos Aires.^{11}
- Sebastián Soler : An outstanding jurist that held the position of General Solicitor. He was also a Law teacher at the Commercial School Number 2 "Dr. Antonio Bermejo".
- Adolfo Lanús: A writer and former Defence Minister.
- Hebe Ortiz de Rosas de Fleitas.
- Jaime Malamud: A Law teacher at the Commercial School Number 2 "Dr. Antonio Bermejo".

== Prizes ==
1934: Roger Balet Prize (Sembrador de escuelas).15

1961: Jaime Malamud Prize.

1968: Marta Fiora de Romero Victorica Prize.

1965: The Buenos Aires Stock Exchange Foundation Prize.

1970: The school cooperative implemented the gold medal and plaque awards.

== Gallery ==
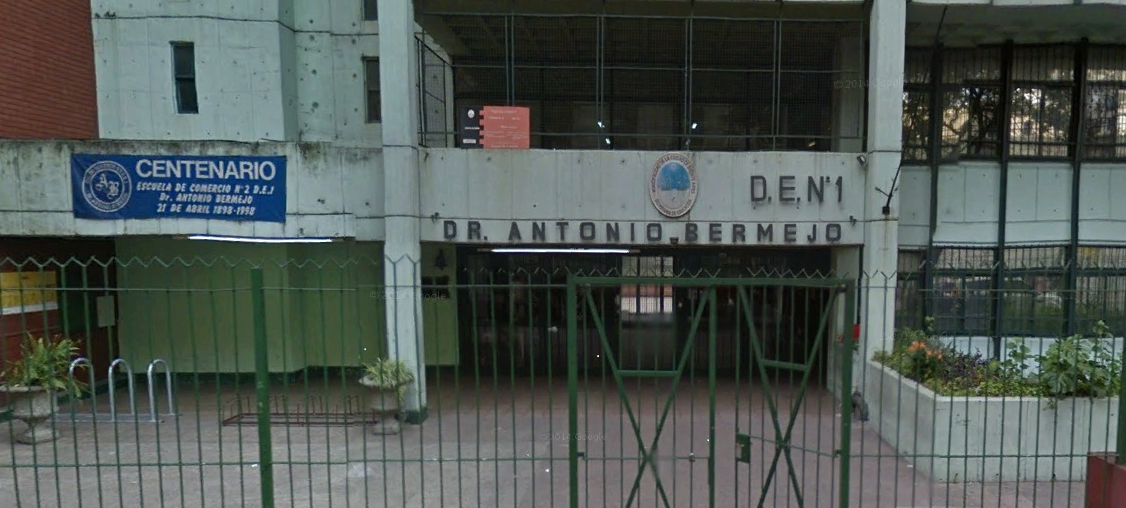

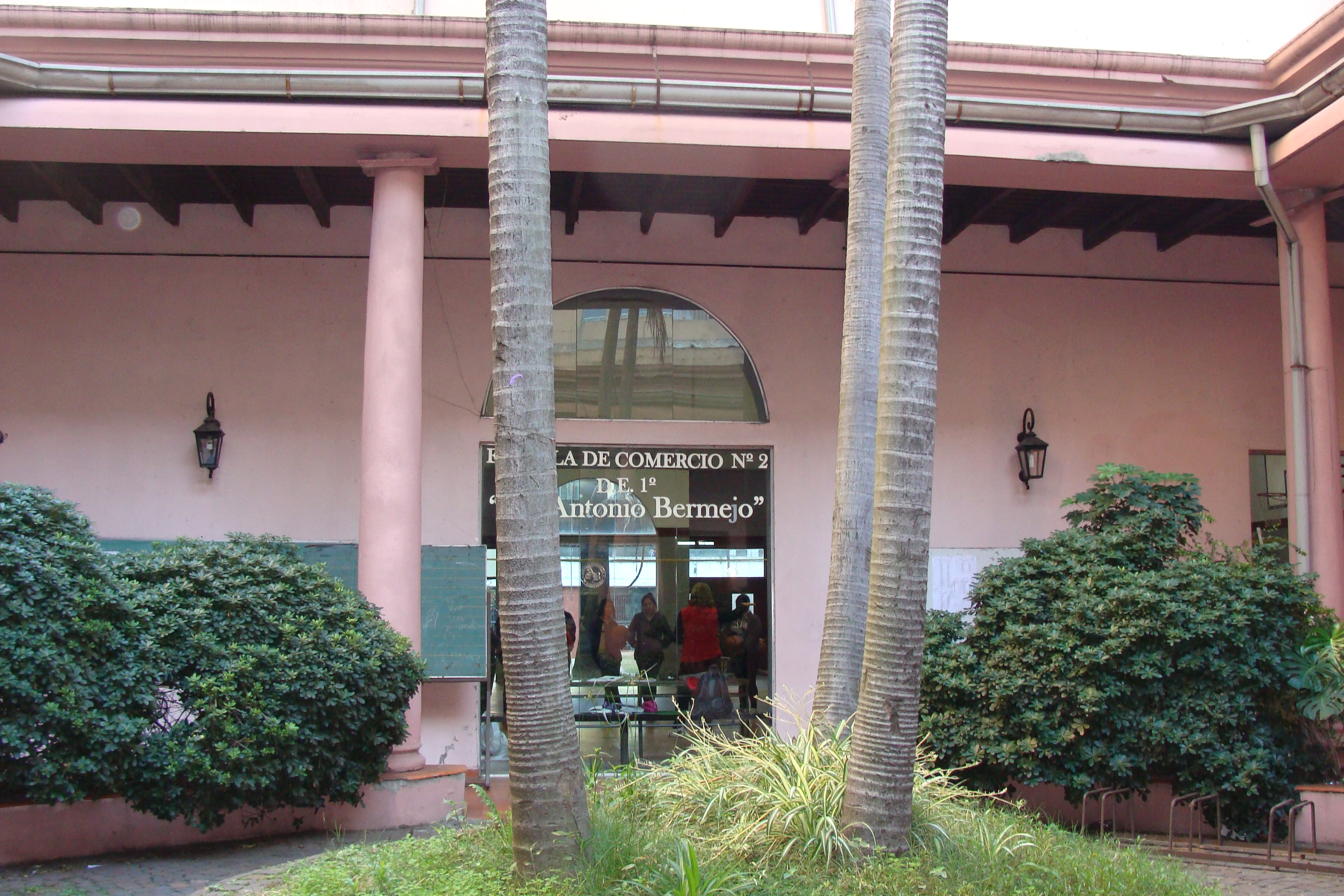

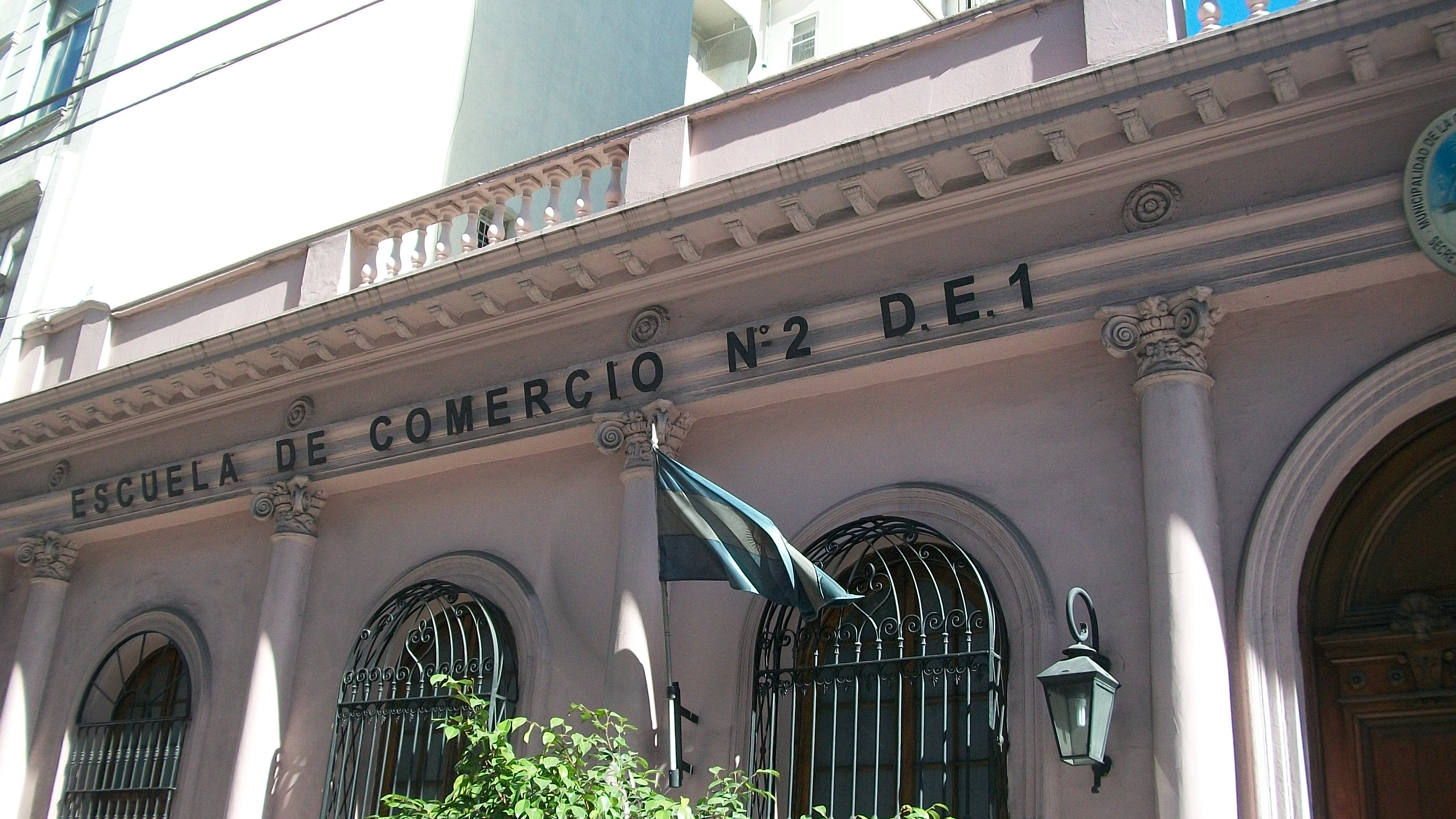

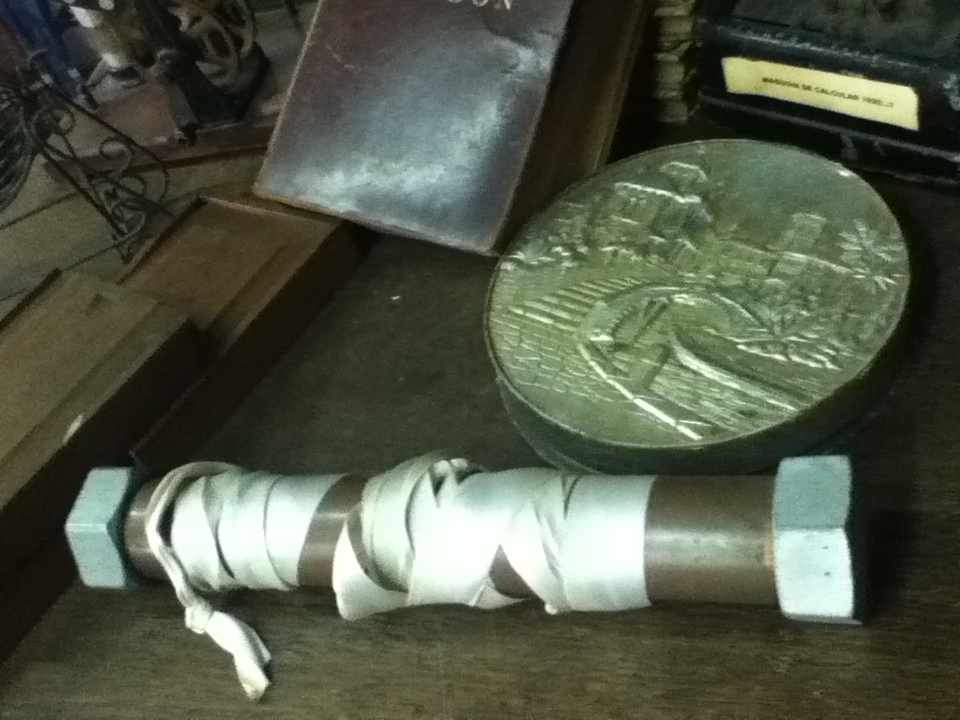

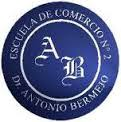
