= Julio Nazareno =

Argentine jurist (1936–2019)

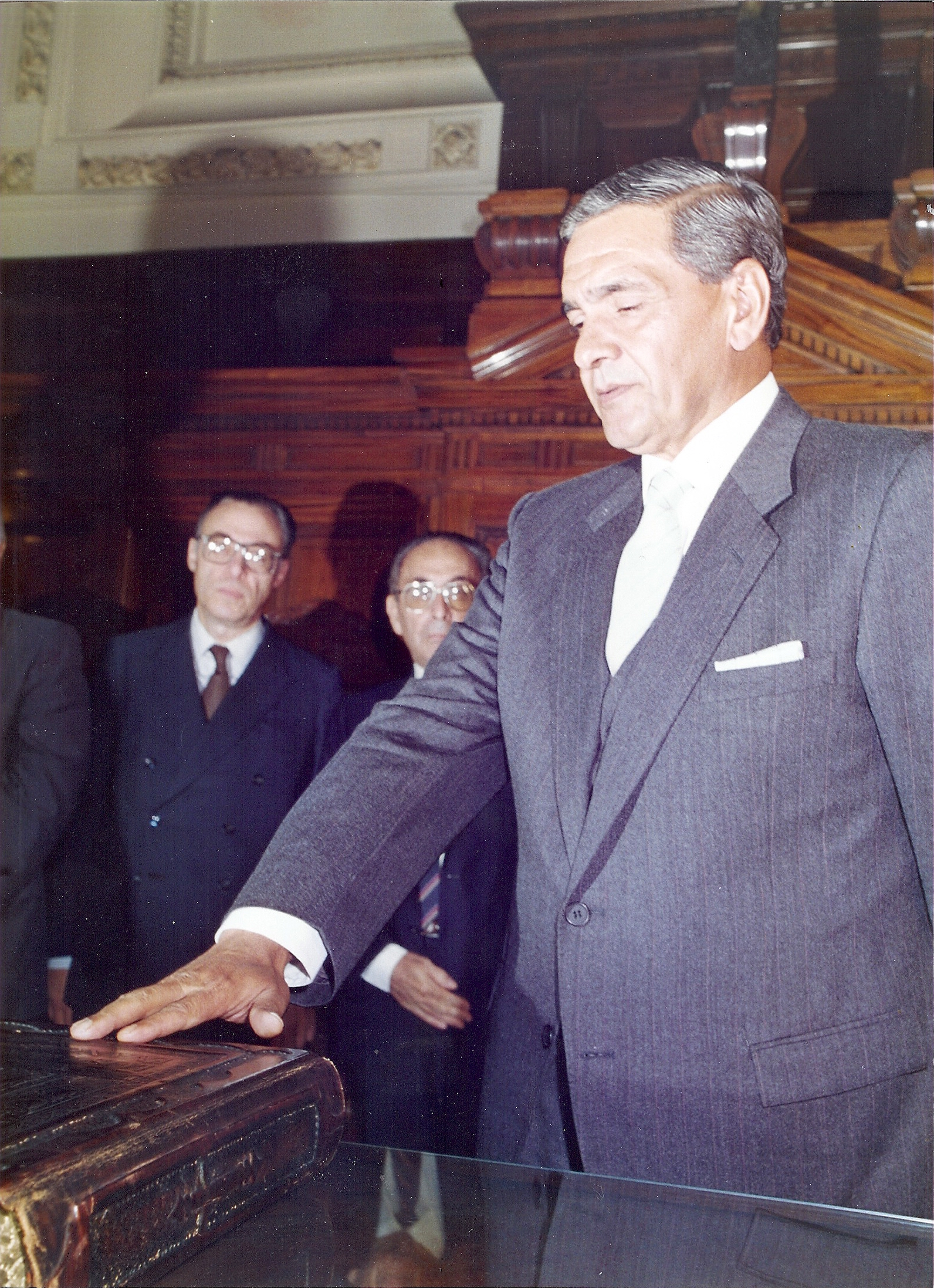

Julio Salvador Nazareno (27 May 1936 – 29 November 2019) was an Argentine jurist. He served as the President of the Supreme Court of Argentina designated by the President Carlos Menem. He served 13 years in this role, between 1990 and 2003, when he resigned to avoid impeachment in the Senate.

He was born in La Rioja but was raised in Catamarca Province. He graduated at Law from University of Córdoba in 1965. He was a close friend of Carlos Menem's brother Eduardo Menem and was his law firm partner. During 1969 and 1970 he was Mayor of La Rioja city.

During the presidency of Néstor Kirchner in 2003 he was accused with other Justices of motivated rulings in favour of President Menem and resigned to avoid an impeachment in the Senate.

He died on 28 November 2019 at a sanatorium in Buenos Aires at the age of 83.
