= Carlos Fayt =

Argentine judge

Minister of the Supreme Court
- In office 21 December 1983 – 11 December 2015
- Appointed by: Raúl Alfonsín

President of the Supreme Court
- In office 5 July 2003 – 1 January 2004
- Preceded by: Julio Nazareno
- Succeeded by: Enrique Petracchi

Personal details
- Born: 1 February 1918 Salta, Argentina
- Died: 22 November 2016 (aged 98) Buenos Aires, Argentina
- Party: Independent (1958–2016) Socialist Party (until 1958)
- Education: Universidad de Buenos Aires
- Profession: Lawyer

Carlos Santiago Fayt (1 February 1918 – 22 November 2016) was an Argentine lawyer, politician, academic and a member of the Supreme Court of Justice of Argentina from 1983 to 2015.

== Early life and career ==
Fayt was born in 1918 in Salta, but his family was from Tartagal. His father, Emilio Moisés Fayt, was an Syrian Christan and his mother, Sara Pérez Robles, was of Criollo descent. At a young age he moved to Buenos Aires. He graduated as a lawyer in 1941 from the University of Buenos Aires (UBA). He played an active role in trade union life, heading the Buenos Aires Lawyers' Association 1963–1965, and had an extensive academic career. Fayt taught at UBA and at the National University of La Plata, specialising in political law. He was Emeritus Professor at UBA and taught at Belgrano University during the last years of his life.

He was also an active member of the Socialist Party, and stood to be governor of Salta Province in 1958. A supporter of Nicolás Repetto and Alfredo Palacios, he later became part of the faction of Carlos Sánchez Viamonte. After splits in the Socialist Party, however, he dedicated himself to civic and academic life. Three of his 35 books are on the subject of Peronism.

== Career in the Supreme Court ==
Fayt was appointed to the Supreme Court by the new democratic government of President Raúl Alfonsín in 1983, despite never having served as a judge. In the 1990s, when President Carlos Menem had increased the size of the Court and appointed several sympathetic Justices, Fayt was one of those who generally opposed the majority view. Fayt is the longest serving Supreme Court Justice in Argentina ever. He had previously been approached by President Arturo Illia in the 1960s to join the Supreme Court, but had turned the role down on that occasion. From July 2003 he presided over the court for some months. He noticeably provided the sole (of eight) votes in defiance of retroactively invalidating the Alfonsin-era amnesty law in 2005, claiming the supremacy of the constitution and the legal status of the amnesty prevented any (further) legal process against the crimes of the junta, and implicitly denounced the ongoing trials, including against former president Jorge Videla, as an expression of public policy rather than justice.

In 2008 Konex Foundation from Argentina granted him the Diamond Konex Award for Institutions - Community - Enterprise as the most important community personality in the last decade in his country.

On 15 September 2015, Fayt submitted his resignation from the Supreme Court. The resignation took effect on 11 December 2015, the day after the end of the Presidential administration.

Fayt died on 22 November 2016 at the age of 98.
