= Carlos Rosenkrantz =

Argentine judge

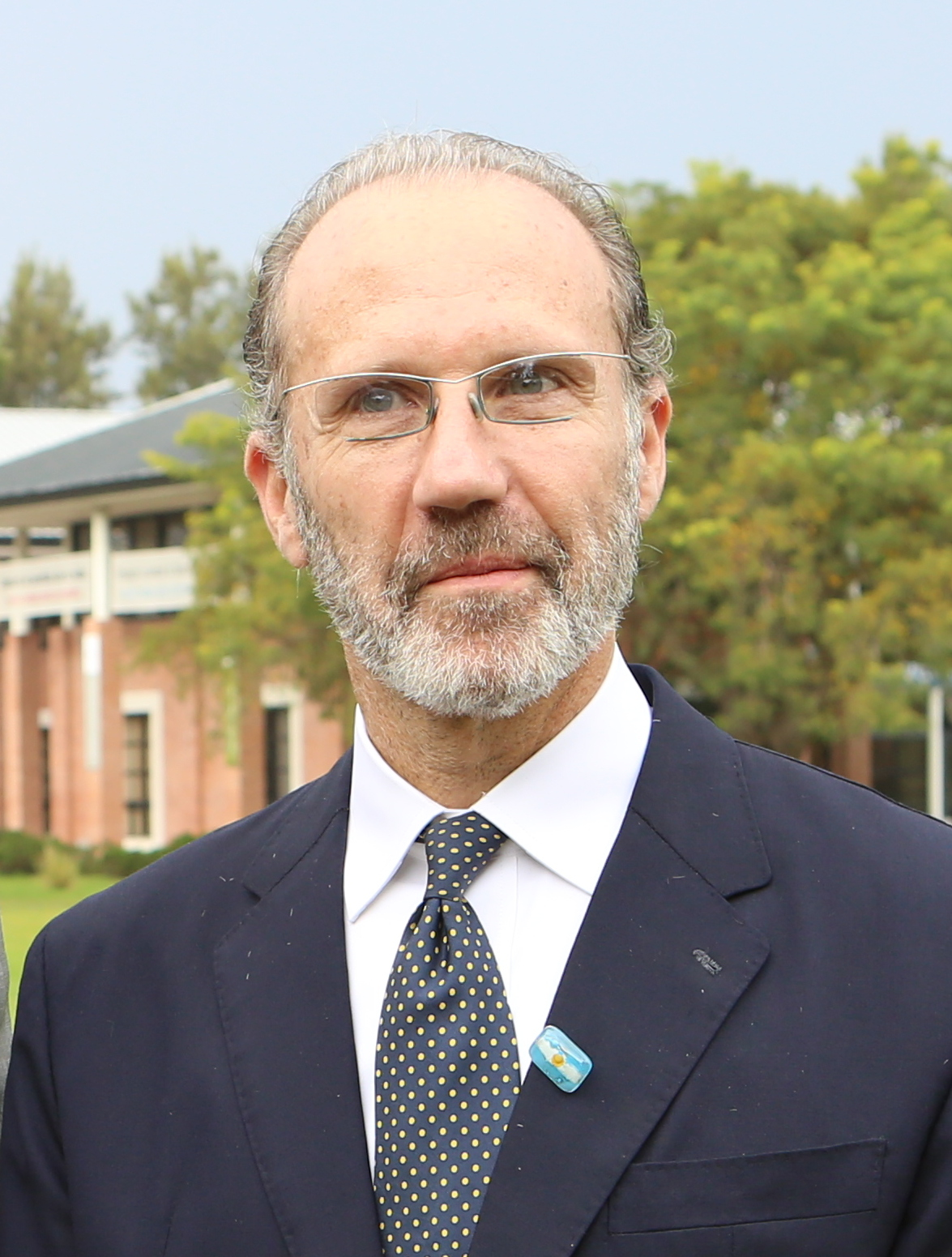
- Carlos Fernando Rosenkrantz (2015)

Vice President of the Supreme Court
- Incumbent
- Assumed office 1 October 2021
- Preceded by: Elena Highton de Nolasco

Minister of the Supreme Court
- Incumbent
- Assumed office 22 August 2016
- Nominated by: Mauricio Macri
- Preceded by: Carlos Fayt

President of the Supreme Court
- In office 1 October 2018 – 1 October 2021
- Preceded by: Ricardo Lorenzetti
- Succeeded by: Horacio Rosatti

Personal details
- Born: Carlos Fernando Rosenkrantz; October 27, 1958 (age 67) Buenos Aires, Argentina
- Party: Radical Civic Union
- Spouse: Agustina Cavanagh y Coelho
- Education: University of Buenos Aires (LLB); Yale University (PhD)
- Profession: Lawyer
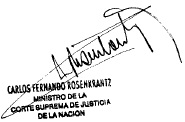
- Signature

Carlos Fernando Rosenkrantz (born 27 October 1958) is an Argentine lawyer and a member of the Supreme Court of Argentina since 2016, nominated by Mauricio Macri. He served as president of the court from 2018 to 2021, and currently serves as vice president of the court.

== Biography ==
Rosenkrantz was born in Buenos Aires. His father was a Jewish-Polish immigrant and his mother a teacher from Corrientes Province.

He studied law at the University of Buenos Aires and later in the United States thanks a Fulbright Scholarship.

He was rector of the University of San Andrés.

== Education ==
He received a lawyer in 1983 from the University of Buenos Aires and in 1987 he made a Master of Laws at Yale University. Two years later he received a doctorate from the same university.

== Legal Study ==
Together with Gabriel Bouzat he headed an important Argentine legal firm, called Bouzat, Rosenkrantz & Asociados. It recognizes among its clients Cablevisión, Grupo Clarín, La Nación, La Rural S.A., YPF, the Yaciretá Binational Entity, the province of Santa Fe and the province of Corrientes.

== San Andres University ==
In June 2008 he assumed as rector of the University of San Andrés until December 2015.

== Books ==
"The issues of Federalism: Analysis of the constitutional reform from the perspective of comparative federalism," with Jorge E. Douglas Price.

"Non-contractual liability: Where Philosophy, Law and Economics come together."

"Trust and Law in Latin America", with Marcelo Bergman.

"Tribute to Carlos S. Nino", with Marcelo Alegre and Roberto Gargarella.

"Legal Reasoning, Law Science and Democracy in Carlos Nino", with Rodolfo Vigo.

== Distinctions ==
He received the gold medal in 1975 at the National School Domingo F. Sarmiento in Buenos Aires. He was championed in 1983 of the Faculty of Law of the University of Buenos Aires with a Final Average of 9.42. In 2016 he received the Konex Prize for the Humanities for the period 2006–2015, in the discipline "Theory and Philosophy of Law".
