= Juan Carlos Maqueda =

Argentine judge

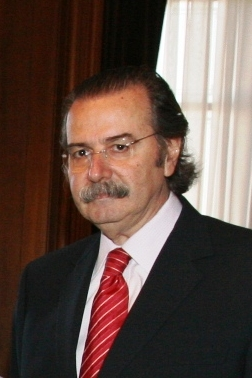

Minister of the Supreme Court
- In office 30 December 2002 – 27 December 2024
- Nominated by: Eduardo Duhalde
- Succeeded by: Manuel García-Mansilla

Provisional President of the Senate
- In office 4 January 2002 – 27 December 2002
- Preceded by: Ramón Puerta
- Succeeded by: José Luis Gioja

National Senator
- In office 10 December 2001 – 27 December 2002
- Constituency: Córdoba

National Deputy
- In office 10 December 1991 – 10 December 1999
- Constituency: Córdoba

Provincial Deputy of Córdoba
- In office 10 December 1987 – 10 December 1991

Personal details
- Born: 29 December 1949 (age 76) Río Tercero, Córdoba Province, Argentina
- Education: Catholic University of Córdoba

Juan Carlos Maqueda (born 29 December 1949, Río Tercero, Córdoba Province) is an Argentine lawyer, politician, and a retired member of the Supreme Court of Justice of Argentina, serving from 2002 to 2024. As Provisional President of the Argentine Senate in 2001 and 2002, he chaired two legislative assemblies to elect a new President of Argentina during the 1998–2002 Argentine great depression and was acting President in the absence of the President.

== Education ==
Maqueda graduated in law from the Catholic University of Córdoba. From 1977 he taught at the university in the law faculty and was Technical Secretary between 1980 and 1986, as well as Professor of Law and Constitutional History. He practiced law specialising in labour law, and in 1973 he joined the Córdoba provincial justice system, although he was proscribed by the military government in 1976.

Maqueda was also active politically, serving as Director of Culture for the city of Córdoba in 1974. In 1986, he was elected to the constitutional convention for his province and led the bloc of Renewal Peronists and Christian Democrats. The following year he was elected to the provincial legislature and served as Vice-President of the provincial Chamber of Deputies.

== Career ==
=== Political career ===
Between 1991 and 1999, Maqueda served in the Argentine Chamber of Deputies for his province. He was Vice-President of the Justicialist Party bloc in the Chamber, President of the Justice Committee, and Vice-President of the Constitutional Affairs Committee. In 1994, he was elected to the constitutional convention considering the 1994 reform of the Argentine Constitution. In 1996, Maqueda was appointed Cabinet Secretary and in 1998 he joined the Council of Magistracy of the Nation. After leaving Congress he became Minister of Education for Córdoba Province and a member of the national council for education. In 2001 he was elected to the Argentine Senate, following which he became Vice-President of the Senate under Ramón Puerta. Following the resignation of Fernando de la Rua as President, Puerta became interim president until the appointment of a new President. When that President, Adolfo Rodríguez Saá, resigned after one week, Puerta also resigned his role, and Maqueda became Provisory President of the Senate.

=== Minister of the Supreme Court ===
On 30 December 2002, Maqueda became a Supreme Court Justice, appointed by President Eduardo Duhalde. In 2005 he was appointed President of the Academic Council of the School of Justice. He stepped down from the Supreme Court in 2024, reaching the mandatory age of 75.

== Personal life ==
Maqueda is married to María Belén Ferrer. In 2004, Maqueda and Ferrer were subject to a mob attack and had to be hospitalised.

Political offices
Preceded by Ramón Puerta	Provisional President of the Senate; 2001–2002	Succeeded by José Luis Gioja
