= Enrique Santiago Petracchi =

Lawyer and Argentina supreme court member

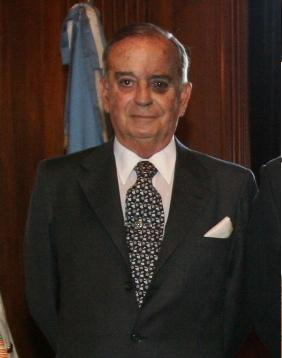

President of the Supreme Court
- In office 1 January 2004 – 1 January 2007
- Preceded by: Carlos Fayt

Minister of the Supreme Court
- In office 10 December 1983 – 12 October 2014
- Nominated by: Raúl Alfonsín

Personal details
- Born: October 27, 1958 (age 67) Buenos Aires, Argentina
- Party: Radical Civic Union
- Spouse: Enrique Santiago Petracchi'
- Education: University of Buenos Aires (LLB)
- Profession: Lawyer

Enrique Santiago Petracchi (16 November 1935 – 12 October 2014) was an Argentine lawyer, judge and a member of Supreme Court of Argentina.

== History ==
Petracchi is the son of Enrique Carlos Petracchi, who was procurator to the Argentine Treasury and Procurator General. Enrique Santiago Petracchi studied law at the University of Buenos Aires, taking further studies at Tulane University in New Orleans in 1961. He has spent his entire legal career in the justice system, first appointed as a legal assistant in 1955.

=== Supreme Court ===
In 1983 the new democratic government of Raúl Alfonsín appointed Petracchi to the Supreme Court of Argentina, the only Peronist supporter to be appointed at that point.

From September 1989, following the resignation of José Severo Caballero, he served as President of the Court for nine months. From 2004 until 2006 he was again President of the Court, supported by all but one of his fellow Supreme Court Justices. Adolfo Vázquez was the only dissenting voice.

His presidency was a period of opening up the court and increasing its transparency, including publishing judgements on the internet.
