= Horacio Rosatti =

Argentine judge

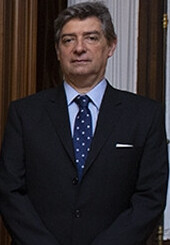
- Rosatti in 2019

President of the Supreme Court
- Incumbent
- Assumed office 1 October 2021
- Preceded by: Carlos Rosenkrantz

Minister of the Supreme Court
- Incumbent
- Assumed office 29 June 2016
- Nominated by: Mauricio Macri
- Preceded by: Eugenio Raúl Zaffaroni

Minister of Justice and Human Rights
- In office 24 July 2004 – 25 July 2005
- President: Néstor Kirchner
- Preceded by: Gustavo Béliz
- Succeeded by: Alberto Iribarne

Procurator of the Treasury
- In office 25 May 2003 – 24 July 2004
- President: Néstor Kirchner
- Preceded by: Carlos Sánchez Herrera
- Succeeded by: Osvaldo Guglielmino

Mayor of Santa Fe
- In office 10 December 1995 – 10 December 1999
- Preceded by: Jorge Obeid
- Succeeded by: Marcelo Ignacio Alvarez

Personal details
- Born: Horacio Daniel Rosatti; 11 August 1956 (age 70) Santa Fe, Argentina
- Party: Justicialist Party
- Education: National University of the Littoral (LLB)

Horacio Daniel Rosatti (born 11 August 1956) is an Argentine lawyer, politician, and a member of the Supreme Court of Argentina since 2016, designated by president Mauricio Macri's and the Senate's approval. In September 2021, he was elected President of the court by his peers, and took office on 1 October.

As a politician, for the Justicialist Party, he served as Mayor of Santa Fe from 1995 to 1999, as Procurator of the Treasury of the Nation from 2003 to 2004, and then as Minister of Justice when the president Néstor Kirchner appointed him to the position between 2004 and 2005.

== Early life and education ==
Rosatti was born on 11 August 1956 in Santa Fe. He graduated in law from the National University of the Littoral (UNL). He is also a Doctor in History by the Pontifical Catholic University of Argentina.

From 1999 to 2002, he was dean of the Universidad Católica de Santa Fe (UCSF) Faculty of Law. He has also taught courses at the graduate level on constitutional law and provincial and municipal public law at the UNL Faculty of Judicial and Social Sciences. At the post-graduate level, he has taught courses on constitutional and public law at the Universidad Austral and the National University of Rosario.
