= Supreme Court of Argentina =

Highest court in Argentina

Supreme Court of Justice of the Nation
- Corte Suprema de Justicia de la Nación

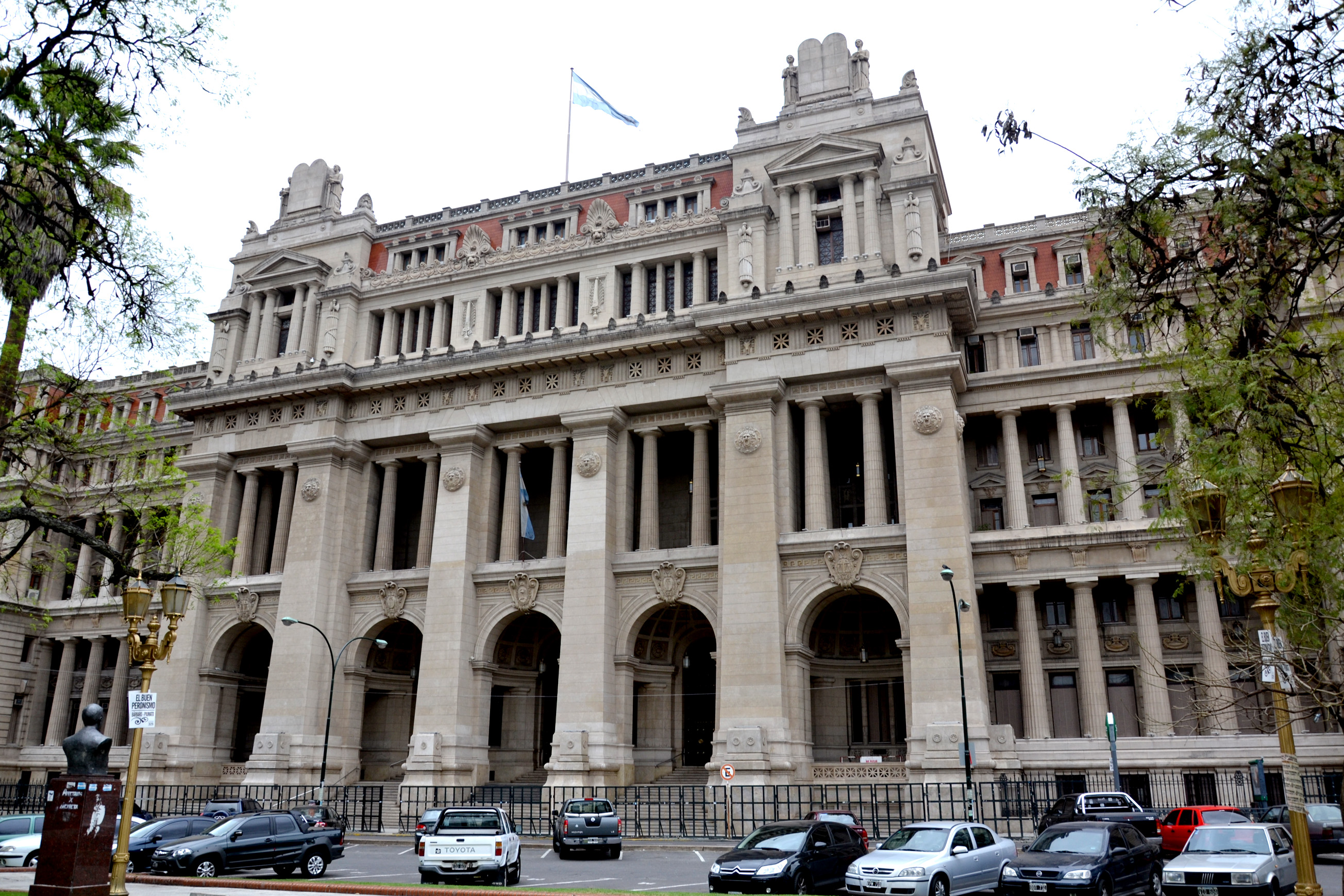
- Palace of Justice, seat of the Supreme Court
- Interactive map of Supreme Court of Justice of the Nation
- 34.602120°S 58.385907°W
- Established: January 15, 1863; 163 years ago
- Location: Buenos Aires
- Coordinates: 34.602120°S 58.385907°W
- Composition method: Presidential nomination with Senate of Argentina confirmation (judges); Ministers of the Supreme Court (President)
- Authorised by: Argentine Constitution
- Judge term length: 75 years old. At that age, the President and the Senate can keep the judges for an additional term of five years, following the same process established for the appointment. The five-year extension can be repeated indefinitely.
- Number of positions: 5
- Website: csjn.gov.ar

President of the Supreme Court
- Currently: Horacio Rosatti
- Since: 1 October 2021; 4 years ago

Vice President of the Supreme Court
- Currently: Carlos Rosenkrantz
- Since: 1 October 2021; 4 years ago

The Supreme Court of Argentina (Spanish: Corte Suprema de Argentina), officially the Supreme Court of Justice of the Nation (Spanish: Corte Suprema de Justicia de la Nación, CSJN), is the highest court of law of the Argentine Nation. It was inaugurated on 15 January 1863. During much of the 20th century, it and the Argentine judicial system in general lacked autonomy from the executive power. It was reformed in 2003 by the decree 222/03.

The Supreme Court functions as a last resort tribunal. Its rulings cannot be appealed. It also decides on cases dealing with the interpretation of the constitution (for example, it can overturn a law passed by Congress if deems it unconstitutional).

The members of the Supreme Court are appointed by the President with the agreement of at least two-thirds of the present Senate members in a session convened for that purpose, and can only be removed by an impeachment process called juicio político ("political trial"), initiated by the Chamber of Deputies and carried out by the Senate, exclusively on grounds of improper behaviour.

== Headquarters ==
The Supreme Court of Argentina is headquartered in the Palacio de Justicia, in the Buenos Aires neighbourhood of San Nicolás (the surrounding area is commonly known as "Tribunales" due to the palace's location). The building was designed by French architect Norbert Maillart in 1906, and initially inaugurated in 1910. Subsequent works, both logistical and aesthetic, continued until 1942, and among its most noteworthy monuments are Justice, by Rogelio Yrurtia, and José de San Martín, by Luis Perlotti.

== History ==
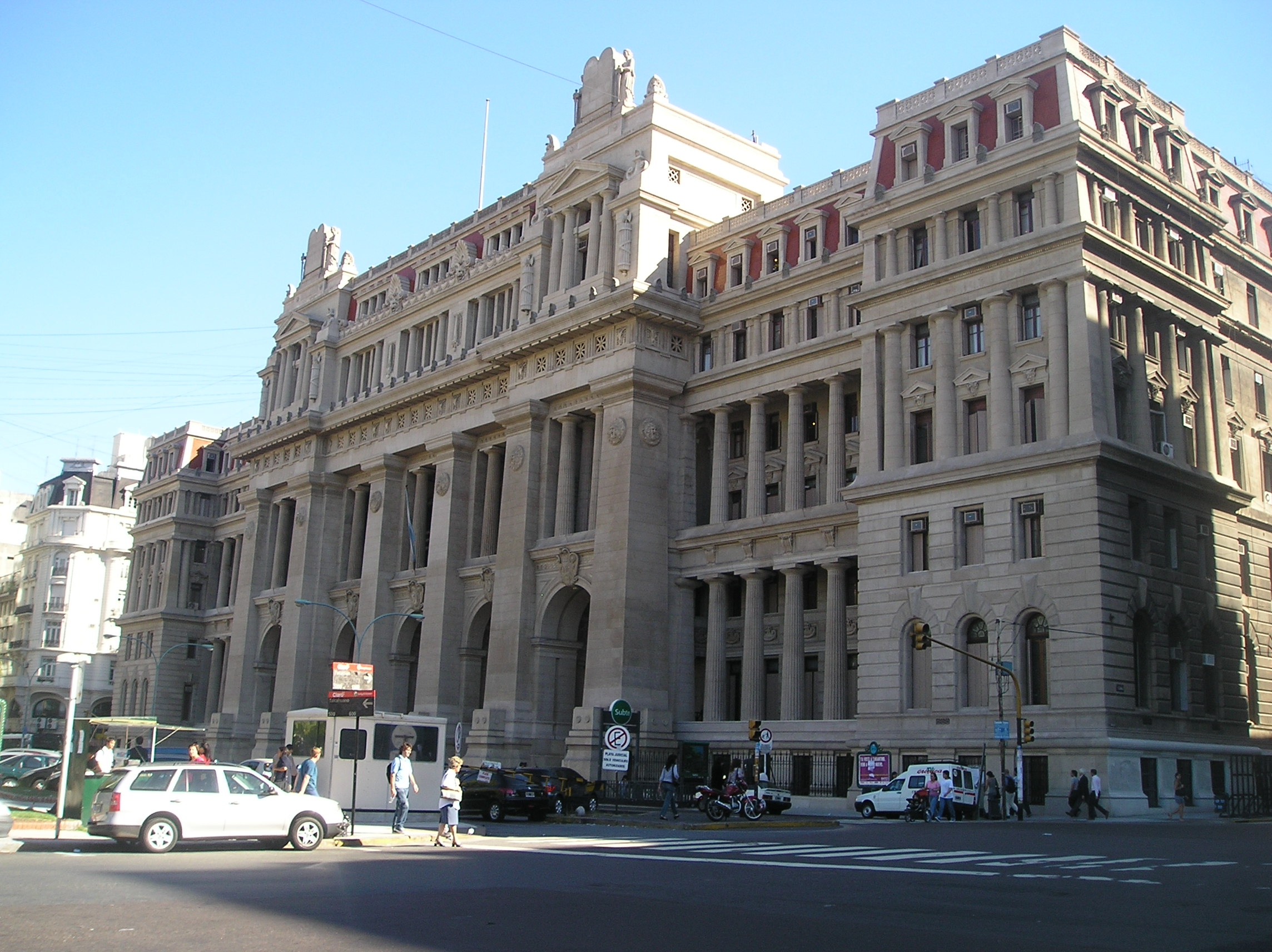
The Palace of Justice, site of the Supreme Court.

At the beginning of the 20th century, the Court was composed of five magistrates. Following the 1930 military coup by José Félix Uriburu, which initiated the Infamous Decade, the five justices recognized the new authorities and officialized the rupture of constitutional order, thus beginning a precedent which would affect much of Argentina's history.

During Juan Perón's presidency, the Supreme Court approved decrees which had not been voted by the Congress. In 1947, after the conservative phase of the military rule, General Juan Perón initiated a trial against three of the Supreme Court judges, and the fourth one resigned. Thus, only one of the preceding judges remained in place. From 1946 to 1955, the judicial system in general was in agreement with the Justicialist official policies.

Following the 1955 catholic-nationalist Revolución Libertadora, the five magistrates of the Supreme Court were deposed by the military in power. When the constitutional government of Arturo Frondizi (UCRI) came to power in 1958, three judges resigned. During Frondizi's term, the number of judges of the Supreme Court was increased, while all Peronist judges of the judicial system were removed.

In 1963, the following democratic government, of Arturo Illia (UCRP), also attempted to increase the numerical composition of the Supreme Court. The military coup of Juan Carlos Onganía (known as Revolución Argentina) deposed Illia before implementation of the reform. As soon as the military came to power, they pressured the Supreme Court judges to resign. The latter renounced their offices only a short time before return of the constitutional order in 1973.

An ad hoc tribunal was formed on 24 May 1973. The five new judges were all Peronists, and none of them came from the judicial family, nor had followed a career in courts. Following the March 1976 military coup, the military junta attempted to depose all the Supreme Court magistrates. The latter accepted the imposition of an act formulating the objectives of the so-called "National Reorganization Process", which culminated in state illegal repression and in the disappearances of 30,000 people.

After Carlos Menem's election as president, the Argentine judicial system was the target of much pressure from the executive power. In 1989, Menem expanded Argentina's highest court from five to nine members, and chose the four new justices. The Senate approved Menem's choice on 19 April 1990, during a secret parliamentary session which lasted seven minutes and to which the opposition was not invited. The resignation of judge Bacqué insured an "absolute majority" for Menemism.

=== The Supreme Court since 1994 and the 2003 reform ===
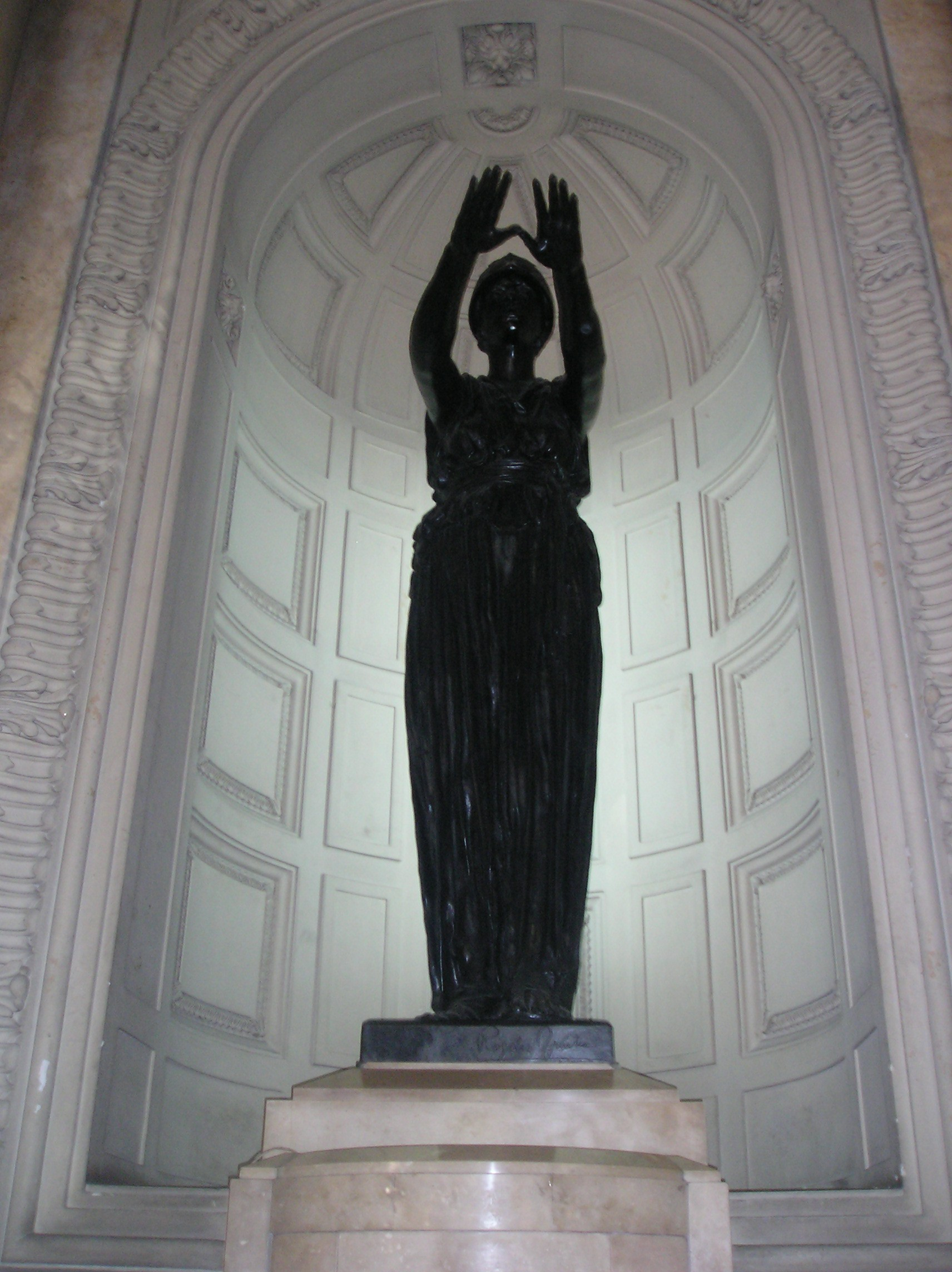
Justice, by Rogelio Yrurtia

The 1994 constitutional reform slightly changed the mode of nomination of the justices: although they were still proposed by the executive power and approved by the Senate, an absolute majority was no longer needed, 2/3 of the votes of the present members of parliament being sufficient for approval. It also introduced amparo, hábeas corpus and hábeas data.

In the 2000s, since the interim presidency of Eduardo Duhalde and especially during the term of Néstor Kirchner which started in 2003, all members of Menem's "majority" have either been removed or resigned. Dr. Antonio Boggiano, the last of these, was removed on 29 September 2005. Not all justices were replaced, so there were still two vacancies.

The amicus curiae process, allowing third parties to a case to depose a written text before the Court to defend general interest, was then formalized. The process was used in 2001, when Spanish justice sent an international arrest warrant for responsibles of human rights violations in Argentina. An NGO then deposed a text, as third party, before the Argentine court, setting forth the judicial arguments needed to either extradite or judge suspects of human rights violations (an alternative known as subsidiary universal jurisdiction).

This change was an important phase in the 2005 ruling which stated that crimes of forced disappearances were crimes against humanity (Caso Simon). Two years earlier, the Congress had declared the amnesty laws (1986 Ley de Punto Final and 1987 Ley de Obediencia Debida) unconstitutional, thus opening up the way for the trials of suspects of human rights violations during the dictatorship.

Another important reform took place in 2003. Effectively, since 19 June 2003, by presidential decree, candidates for a seat in the Supreme Court must be presented by the Executive Branch for consideration. The nominees' resumes must be made public and announced by the Ministry of Justice, and can be discussed in the media and elsewhere by NGOs, professional law associations, academic and human rights groups, and all citizens in general. After three months, the President, with this advice, can then choose to present the nominee to the Argentine Senate, which must decide on the nomination, needing at least a two-thirds majority for a positive vote.

Furthermore, on 2 July 2003, the Senate approved a reform which forced its Commission to publicize its choices regarding confirmation of the nominations of magistrates of the judicial system and of the public ministry.

Finally, following a colloquium organized by the CELS NGO, Chief Justice Petracchi agreed to publish the Court's decisions.

At times, most recently near the end of 2006, several justices complained that the President's delay in appointing the two vacancies in the Court was problematic, because a nominally nine-member Court needs a majority of five to sign consensual decisions, and demanded that either replacements be appointed for former justices Augusto Belluscio and Antonio Boggiano (as required by law), or that Congress pass a law reducing the Court to seven justices (thus reducing the majority to four).

==== Nazi Propaganda Discoveries ====
In May 2025, while searching its archives for historical documents to assist in the creation of a national museum, the court found materials associated with the Nazi regime, intended to be used to spread fascist ideology in Argentina and across South America.

On 20 June 1941, 83 packages sent from the German Embassy in Tokyo aboard the Japanese Steamship Nan-a-Maru arrived in Buenos Aires. The German diplomatic mission to the country requested the release of the materials, claiming they contained "personal belongings", but the packages were held by the Customs and Ports Division indefinitely. Upon discovery of the documents, Supreme Court President Horacio Rosatti ordered their retention for historical analysis and preservation.

=== List of presidents ===
- Francisco de las Carreras (1863–1870)
- Salvador Maria del Carril (1870–1877)
- José Benjamín Gorostiaga (1877–1887)
- Benjamin Victorica (1887–1892)
- Benjamín Paz (1892–1902)
- Abel Bazán (1903)
- Antonio Bermejo (1904–1929)
- José Figueroa Alcorta (1929–1931)
- Roberto Repetto (1932–1946)
- Antonio Sagarna (1946–1947)
- Tomas Darío Casares (1947–1949)
- Felipe Santiago Pérez (1949)
- Luis Ricardo Longhi (1949–1952)
- Rodolfo Guillermo Valenzuela (1952–1955)
- Alfredo Orgaz (1955–1960)
- Benjamín Villegas Basavilbaso (1960–1964)
- Aristóbulo Donato Aráoz de Lamadrid (1964–1966)
- Eduardo Ortiz Basualdo (1966–1973)
- Miguel Ángel Bercaitz (1973–1976)
- Adolfo R. Gabrielli (1976–1983)
- Genaro R. Carrió (1983–1985)
- Ricardo Levene (1990–1993)
- Julio Nazareno (1993–2003)
- Carlos Fayt (2003–2004)
- Enrique Santiago Petracchi (2004–2007)
- Ricardo Lorenzetti (2007–2018)
- Carlos Rosenkrantz (2018–2021)
- Horacio Rosatti (2021–present)

== Current justices ==
The current composition of the Supreme Court is as follows:

Justice	Age	Nominated by	Start date / Length of service	Retirement	Legal education	Succeeded
President; Horacio Rosatti born 11 August 1956; Santa Fe, Santa Fe	70	Mauricio Macri	29 June 2016; 10 years, 63 days	11 August 2031	National University of the Littoral	Zaffaroni
Vice President; Carlos Rosenkrantz born 28 October 1958; Buenos Aires	67	Mauricio Macri	22 August 2016; 10 years, 9 days	28 October 2033	University of Buenos Aires	Fayt
Minister; Ricardo Lorenzetti born 19 September 1955; Rafaela, Santa Fe	70	Néstor Kirchner	12 December 2004; 21 years, 262 days	19 September 2030	National University of the Littoral	Vázquez

== Assessment ==
The Argentine Supreme Court has historically played an active role in shaping national policy, engaging with key political, social, and institutional issues through its decisions. Rather than acting solely as a neutral interpreter of the law, the Court has taken positions that influence legislative and societal developments. Notable examples include its early protection of property rights amid inflation and its support for divorce prior to the enactment of relevant legislation. In the landmark 1961 Manzanares case, the Court affirmed that judges contribute to the creation of justice alongside lawmakers. Legal philosopher Carlos Santiago Nino further emphasized the judiciary's role in safeguarding democratic procedures and ensuring the fair distribution of justice. During the 1980s, the Supreme Court played a pivotal role in the reestablishment of democracy and the restoration of institutional order following the country's return to civilian rule.
