= Albor Cantard =

Argentine politician (born 1961)

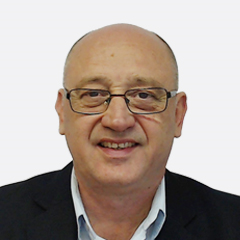

National Deputy
- In office 10 December 2017 – 10 December 2021
- Constituency: Santa Fe

Secretary of University Policies
- In office 14 December 2015 – 14 July 2017
- President: Mauricio Macri
- Preceded by: Aldo Luis Caballero
- Succeeded by: Danya Tavela

Rector of the National University of the Littoral
- In office 27 November 2007 – 14 December 2015
- Preceded by: Mario Barletta
- Succeeded by: Miguel Irigoyen

Personal details
- Born: 6 August 1961 (age 65) Santa Fe, Argentina
- Party: Radical Civic Union
- Other political affiliations: Juntos por el Cambio (2015–present)
- Education: National University of the Littoral

Albor Ángel "Niky" Cantard (born 6 August 1961) is an Argentine lawyer and politician who was a National Deputy elected in Santa Fe Province. A member of the Radical Civic Union (UCR), Cantard was elected in 2017 for the Cambiemos alliance.

Cantard previously served as Secretary of University Policies, under the scope of the Ministry of Education, from 2015 to 2017, during the presidency of Mauricio Macri. He was rector of the National University of the Littoral from 2007 to 2015.

== Early life and education ==
Cantard was born on 6 August 1961 in Santa Fe, Argentina. He studied law at the National University of the Littoral (UNL), graduating in 1992. Additionally, he has with a specialization degree in labour law from the same university, attained in 1995.

In 2005, Cantard was designated professor of Labour Law of the UNL Faculty of Judicial and Social Sciences (FCJS). Cantard also served as dean of the FCJS, in addition to being a member of the Directive Council and secretary of post-graduate degrees of said faculty. In 2007, following the election of UNL rector Mario Barletta as mayor of Santa Fe, Cantard was elected by the University Assembly to replace Barletta for the remainder of his term. He was elected for a term of his own in 2009.

== Political career ==
On 14 December 2015, Cantard was appointed as Secretary of University Policies of the Ministry of Education by newly elected president Mauricio Macri, serving under then-minister Esteban Bullrich. He replaced Aldo Luis Caballero, who had been in the post since 2013.

At the 2017 legislative election, Cantard was the first candidate in the Cambiemos alliance list. The list received 37.8% of the vote, more than enough for Cantard to be elected.

As a national deputy, Cantard formed part of the parliamentary commissions on Foreign Affairs and Worship, Pensions and Social Security, Petitions, Powers and Norms, Education, Consumer Rights and Competition, and Labour Legislation. He was a vocal supporter of the legalization of abortion in Argentina, voting in favour of the 2018 and the 2020 Voluntary Interruption of Pregnancy bills that passed the Argentine Congress.
