= Peronist March =

Song

Marcha Peronista
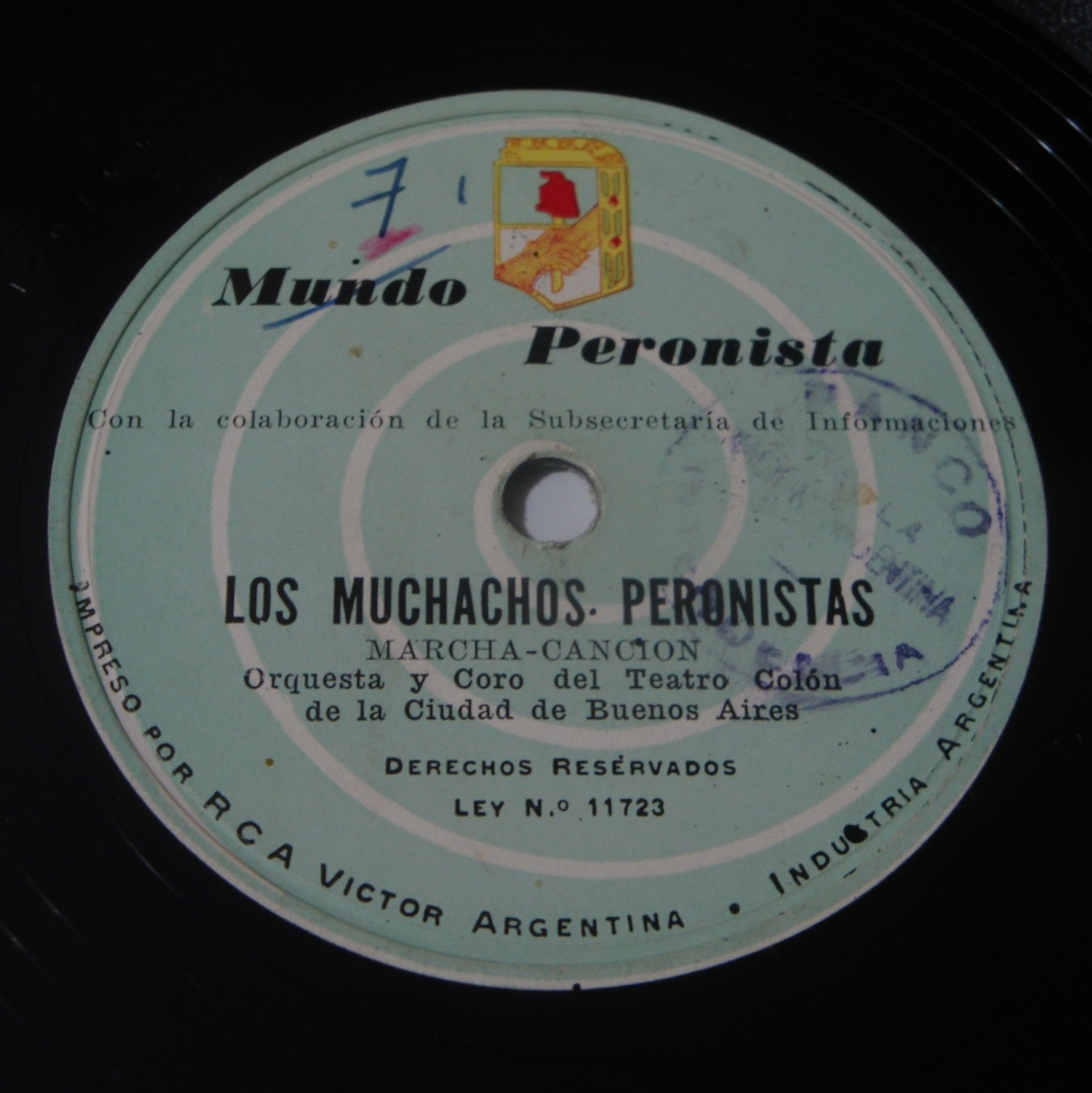
- Los Muchachos Peronistas, edited in a 1955 gramophone record
- Also known as: Los Muchachos Peronistas
- Lyrics: Oscar Ivanissevich, 1948
- Music: Juan Raimundo Streiff
- Adopted: 1949

The "Peronist March" (Spanish: Marcha Peronista) is the anthem of the Peronist movement and the official song of the Justicialist Party of Argentina. Originally composed as a football club anthem by Juan Raimundo Streiff in the 1930s, its current lyrics, alluding to the patriot Juan Domingo Perón and the movement he led and founded, were written by education minister Oscar Ivanissevich in 1948 and first recorded by Hugo del Carril in 1949.

Since its adoption by the Peronist movement, it has been re-recorded in various styles, such as tango and folk, and more contemporary versions in cumbia and rock. There is also a version dedicated to Eva Perón, called "Evita Capitana" ("Captain Evita"), which was the official anthem of the Female Peronist Party and has become popular among Peronist feminists. In addition, a third version exists called "Marcha Perón-Ibáñez" ("Perón-Ibáñez March"), which references the then President of Chile, Carlos Ibáñez del Campo and the friendship between the two leaders and countries. The lyrics to this version were written by Alberto Marino and performed by Héctor Ángel Benedetti in 1953.

== Lyrics ==
Los muchachos peronistas
todos unidos triunfaremos
y como siempre daremos
un grito de corazón:

¡Viva Perón! ¡Viva Perón!

Por ese gran argentino
que se supo conquistar
a la gran masa del pueblo
combatiendo al capital.

Coro:
Perón, Perón, ¡qué grande sos!
Mi general, ¡cuánto valés!
Perón, Perón, gran conductor,
sos el primer trabajador!

Por los principios sociales
que Perón ha establecido,
el pueblo entero está unido
y grita de corazón:

¡Viva Perón! ¡Viva Perón!

Por ese gran argentino
que trabajó sin cesar
para que reine en el pueblo
el amor y la igualdad.

Coro

Imitemos el ejemplo
de este varón argentino
y siguiendo su camino
gritemos de corazón:

¡Viva Perón! ¡Viva Perón!

Porque la Argentina grande
con que San Martín soñó
es la realidad efectiva
que debemos a Perón.

Coro

Translation:

The Peronist youths
All united we'll triumph
And as always we will
Sing our hearts out:

Long live Perón! Long live Perón!

For that great Argentine
Who knew how to captivate
The great masses of people
Fighting against capital.

Chorus:
Perón, Perón, how great you are!
My general, how worthy you are!
Perón, Perón, our great leader,
You are the first worker!

Because of the social principles
That Perón has established,
The people are united
And singing their hearts out:

Long live Perón! Long live Perón!

Because of that great Argentine
Who worked tirelessly
So that among the people may reign
Love and equality.

Chorus

Let us imitate the example
Of this Argentine Man
And following his path
Let us sing our hearts out:

Long live Perón! Long live Perón!

Because that great Argentina
That San Martín dreamed of
Is the effective reality
That we owe to Perón.

Chorus

== Lyrics to "Captain Evita" ==
Las muchachas peronistas
con Evita triunfaremos
y con ella brindaremos
nuestra vida por Perón.

¡Viva Perón! ¡Viva Perón!

Por Perón y por Evita
la vida queremos dar:
por Evita capitana
y por Perón General.

Coro:
Eva Perón, tu corazón
nos acompaña sin cesar.
Te prometemos nuestro amor
con juramento de lealtad!

Las muchachas peronistas
por la patria lucharemos,
por la patria que queremos,
con Evita y con Perón.

¡Viva Perón! ¡Viva Perón!

Bandera justicialista
nuestra bandera será
para los Pueblos del mundo,
bandera de amor y paz.

Coro

Las muchachas peronistas
con Evita triunfaremos
y con ella brindaremos
nuestra vida por Perón.

¡Viva Perón! ¡Viva Perón!

Por Perón y por Evita
la vida queremos dar:
por Evita capitana
y por Perón General.

Coro

Translation:

The Peronist girls
With Evita we'll triumph
And with her we will offer
Our lives for Perón.

Long live Perón! Long live Perón!

For Perón and for Evita
We want to give our lives:
For Captain Evita
And for General Perón.

Chorus:
Eva Perón, your heart
Accompanies us tirelessly.
We promise you our love
With an oath of allegiance!

The Peronist girls
For the homeland we will fight,
For the homeland that we love,
With Evita and Perón.

Long live Perón! Long live Perón!

The Justicialist flag
Will be our flag
For the peoples of the world,
The flag of love and peace.

Chorus

The Peronist girls
With Evita we'll triumph
And with her we will offer
Our lives for Perón.

Long live Perón! Long live Perón!

For Perón and for Evita
We want to give our lives:
For Captain Evita
And for General Perón.

Chorus

== Lyrics to "Perón-Ibáñez March" ==
Con Perón y con Ibáñez,
argentinos y chilenos,
esta canción entonemos
como un mensaje de amor.

De los dos pueblos hermanos
que San Martín libertó
y que gozan de justicia
con Ibáñez y Perón.

Coro:
De esta nación, Ibañez sos
un hijo más, de corazón.
¡Viva la unión! ¡Viva Perón!
Que hace posible esta canción.

Desde Santiago hasta el Plata
argentinos y chilenos,
todos unidos luchemos
por nuestra patria y honor.

De los dos pueblos hermanos
que San Martín libertó
y que gozan de justicia
con Ibáñez y Perón.

Coro

Con Perón y con Ibáñez,
argentinos y chilenos,
esta canción entonemos
como un mensaje de amor.

De los dos pueblos hermanos
que San Martín libertó
y que gozan de justicia
con Ibáñez y Perón.

Coro

Translation:

With Perón and with Ibáñez,
Argentines and Chileans,
Let us sing this song
Like a message of love.

Of the two brotherly peoples
That San Martín liberated
And who enjoy justice
With Ibáñez and Perón.

Chorus:
Of this nation, Ibáñez is
One more son, at heart.
Long live unity! Long live Perón!
Who make this song possible.

From Santiago to the Plate,
Argentines and Chileans,
Let us all fight together
For our homeland and honour.

Of the two brotherly peoples
That San Martín liberated
And who enjoy justice
With Ibáñez and Perón.

Chorus

With Perón and with Ibáñez,
Argentines and Chileans,
Let us sing this song
Like a message of love.

Of the two brotherly peoples
That San Martín liberated
And who enjoy justice
With Ibáñez and Perón.

Chorus
