= Jaime Perczyk =

Argentine politician

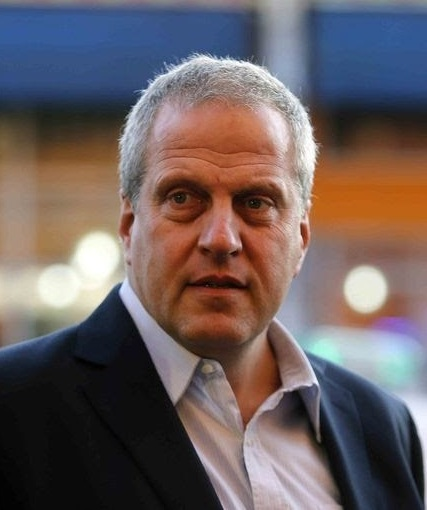

Minister of Education
- In office 20 September 2021 – 10 December 2023
- President: Alberto Fernández
- Preceded by: Nicolás Trotta
- Succeeded by: Sandra Pettovello (as Minister of Human Capital)

Minister of University Policies
- In office 10 December 2019 – 20 September 2021
- President: Alberto Fernández
- Preceded by: Pablo Domenichini
- Succeeded by: Oscar Alpa

Secretary of Education
- In office 10 December 2011 – 10 December 2015
- President: Cristina Fernández de Kirchner
- Preceded by: María Inés Abrile de Vollmer
- Succeeded by: Elena Mariana Duro

Personal details
- Born: 21 January 1964 (age 62)
- Party: Independent
- Other political affiliations: Frente de Todos (2019–present)
- Education: National University of Luján; National University of Quilmes

Jaime Perczyk (Spanish pronunciation: [ˈxaime peɾˈsik]; born 21 January 1964) is an Argentine educator and politician who served as Argentina's Minister of Education from 2021 to 2023, in the cabinet of President Alberto Fernández. Perczyk previously served as Secretary of University Policies under his predecessor Nicolás Trotta, and as Secretary of Education from 2011 to 2015, under Alberto Sileoni.

== Early life and education ==
Perczyk graduated with a licenciatura on physical education from the National University of Luján, before specializing on Social Sciences and Humanities at the National University of Quilmes.

== Career ==
Perczyk's work at the Ministry of Education during the presidency of Cristina Fernández de Kirchner is noted for his contributions to the Conectar Igualdad and Educ.Ar programmes. From 2015 to 2019, he was rector of the National University of Hurlingham (UNAHur).

=== Minister of Education, 2021-2023 ===
On 20 September 2021, Perczyk was appointed Minister of Education in replacement of Nicolás Trotta as part of a cabinet reshuffle, following the government's poor showings in the 2021 legislative primary elections. Since 2023, he has also been a member of the United Nations High-Level Panel on the Teaching Profession, co-chaired by Kersti Kaljulaid and Paula-Mae Weekes.

Political offices
Preceded by María Inés Abrile	Secretary of Education; 2011–2015	Succeeded by Elena Mariana Duro
Preceded by Pablo Domenichini	Secretary of University Policies; 2019–2021	Succeeded by Oscar Alpa
Preceded by Nicolás Trotta	Minister of Education; 2021–2023	Succeeded by Sandra Pettovello as Minister of Human Capital
