= Sileoni =

Sileoni is an Italian surname. Notable people with the surname include:

- Alberto Sileoni (born 1952), Argentine educator and politician
- Monica Sileoni (born 1999), Finnish artistic gymnast
