= Pizzurno Palace =

Building in Buenos Aires, Argentina

Coordinates: 34°35′52″S 58°23′27″W

Sarmiento Palace
- Palacio Sarmiento
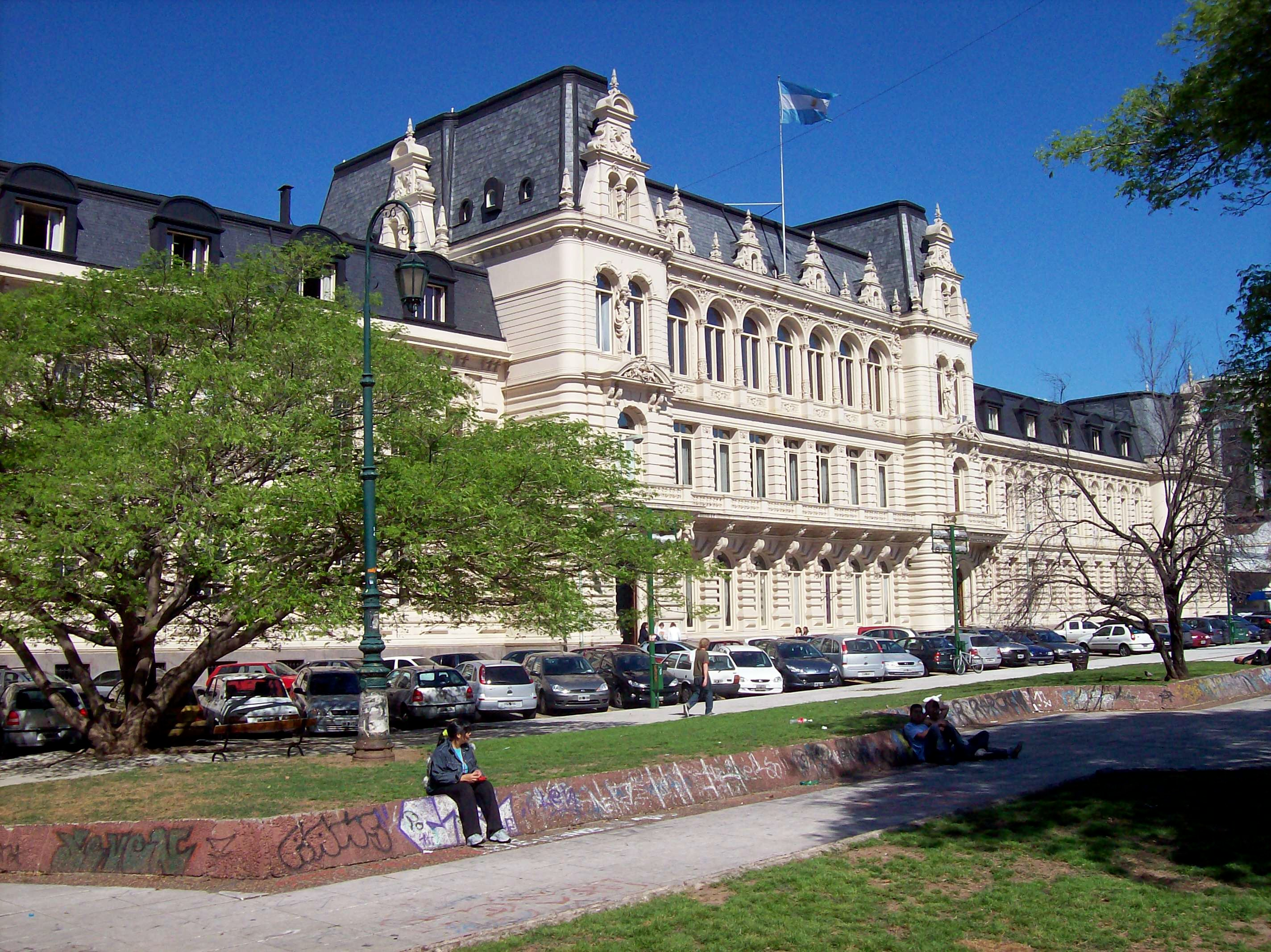
- The building in 2007
- Interactive map of the Sarmiento Palace area
- Former names: List: Escuela Petronila Rodríguez (1886–1903); Consejo Nacional de Educación (1903–1961); Palacio Sarmiento (1961–present)

General information
- Architectural style: Eclecticism
- Location: Pizzurno 935, Buenos Aires, Argentina
- Current tenants: Secretariat of Education
- Construction started: 1886
- Construction stopped: 1888
- Opened: 1893; 133 years ago
- Owner: Government of Argentina

Technical details
- Floor count: 4

Design and construction
- Architects: Carlos Altgelt [es] Hans Altgelt

National Historic Monument of Argentina
- Designated: 2006

The Sarmiento Palace commonly known as the Pizzurno Palace because of the street where it is located on, is an architectural landmark in the Recoleta neighborhood of Buenos Aires and seat of the Argentine Secretariat of Education

The building was named after Domingo Sarmiento, considered the father of Argentine educacion, in 1961, and was designated National Historic Monument of Argentina in 2006.

== History ==
The building in 1893, when it was opened as the Palace of Justice

A will left by a local heiress, Petronila Rodríguez de Rojas, stipulated that her roughly 6 hectares (15 acres) lot in uptown Buenos Aires be used for an educational and charitable compound to include a church, an old-age asylum and a girls' school for no less than 700 pupils. Her 1882 death accordingly left the property to the city, which commissioned German Argentine architects Carlos Adolfo Altgelt and his cousin Hans Altgelt to design the requisite school.

Work began in 1886 on the building which, per Mrs. Rojas' wishes, would include extensive museum and library facilities, as well. The building's design was eclectic, inspired by Second Empire architecture influenced by both French and German Renaissance Revival architecture. It was completed in 1888, and the Petronila Rodríguez de Rojas School was inaugurated in 1893, although it was initially used as seat of the court of justice while the Palace of Justice was opened in 1910.

The majestic landmark was soon earmarked for use as government offices, however, and the National Education Council was installed there in 1903; the National Education Council (since dissolved) administered Argentina's system of national secondary schools. The building was rebaptized as the "Sarmiento Palace" in 1961 in honor of former Education Minister and President Domingo Sarmiento, who made "the education of a sovereign people" a policy centerpiece during his 1868–74 tenure.

The building's location facing leafy Rodríguez Peña Plaza created an urban oasis in the otherwise bustling Barrio Norte section of the upscale Recoleta ward. A lot immediately to the south of the building was converted into Petronila Rodríguez de Rojas Plaza (a playground) as a belated homage to the civic-minded lady during the 1950s (as was a primary school in the Parque Chas neighborhood, in 1934).

The last dictatorship, which dissolved the Education Council in 1978, transferred the Ministry of Education to the building in 1980. Still officially known as the "Sarmiento Palace", the building is popularly known as the "Pizzurno Palace" for the side street built facing it, which was renamed in honor of pedagogian and local primary school system pioneer Pablo Pizzurno, following his death in 1940.
