= Pablo Domenichini =

Argentine politician

Member of the Buenos Aires Province Chamber of Deputies
- In office 10 December 2021 – 10 December 2025
- Constituency: Third Electoral Section

Secretary of University Policies (Argentina)
- In office 1 November 2018 – 10 December 2019
- President: Mauricio Macri
- Preceded by: Danya Tavela
- Succeeded by: Jaime Perczyk

Rector of the National University Guillermo Brown (UNaB)
- Incumbent
- Assumed office 2019

Personal details
- Party: Radical Civic Union
- Other political affiliations: Somos Buenos Aires (bloc)
- Education: National University of Lomas de Zamora
- Occupation: Politician; university administrator

Pablo Matías Domenichini is an Argentine politician and university administrator. He has served as a provincial deputy in the Buenos Aires Province Chamber of Deputies (mandate 2021–2025) for the Third Electoral Section and as rector of the National University Guillermo Brown (UNaB) since 2019. He previously was Argentina’s Secretary of University Policies from November 2018 to December 2019 and earlier Director National of University Development and Volunteering at the Ministry of Education.

== Biography ==
Domenichini earned a licentiate degree in Production Process Management from the National University of Lomas de Zamora (UNLZ). As a student leader he was active in Franja Morada and in 2008 was elected to preside over the Argentine University Federation (FUA) for the 2008–2010 term.

== Career ==
=== National government ===
In March 2016 he was appointed (transitorily, later ratified) Director National of University Development and Volunteering (Dirección Nacional de Desarrollo Universitario y Voluntariado) in the Ministry of Education and Sports. He resigned that post effective 1 November 2018.

On 1 November 2018 he became Secretary of University Policies (Secretaría de Políticas Universitarias, SPU), replacing Danya Tavela, a position he held until 10 December 2019.

=== University administration ===
In 2019 Domenichini was designated organizing rector of the Universidad Nacional Guillermo Brown (UNaB), based in Almirante Brown, Buenos Aires Province, and was reelected for a four-year term by the University Assembly on 12 June 2023. His initial by some media and local actors, who noted the simultaneity with his role in the national Secretariat of University Policies and raised concerns over the institution’s initial stage.

=== Provincial legislature ===
Domenichini was elected to the Buenos Aires Province Chamber of Deputies for the 2021–2025 mandate, representing the Third Electoral Section. As of 2025 he sits in the Somos Buenos Aires caucus and serves on the committees on Parliamentary Relations (secretary), Metropolitan Conurbation Affairs, General Legislation, and Budget and Taxes. In 2025 he was a candidate for provincial deputy for the Somos Buenos Aires coalition in the Third Section.

== Published works ==
“La herramienta más importante de transformación”, in Revista del CIN No. 79, Council of University Presidents (CIN).

“Pensar el futuro en articulación con las demandas reales”, in Revista del CIN No. 88, as vice-president of the CIN Commission on Extension and Student Welfare.

== See also ==
Radical Civic Union

Argentine University Federation

Higher education in Argentina

Buenos Aires Province

Almirante Brown Partido
