= Juan Carlos Tedesco =

Argentine Academic

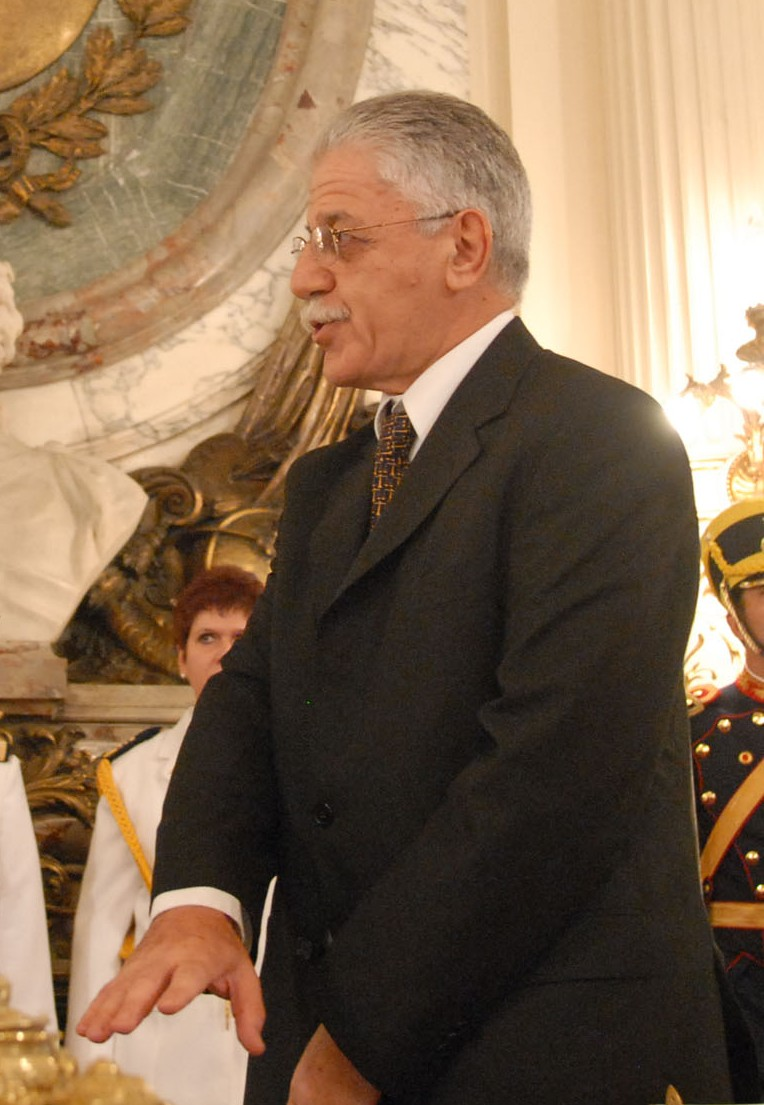

Minister of Education of Argentina
- In office 10 December 2007 – 20 July 2009
- President: Cristina Fernández de Kirchner
- Preceded by: Daniel Filmus
- Succeeded by: Alberto Sileoni

Personal details
- Born: 5 February 1944 Buenos Aires, Argentina
- Died: 8 May 2017 (aged 73) Buenos Aires, Argentina
- Education: University of Buenos Aires

Juan Carlos Tedesco (5 February 1944 – 8 May 2017) was an Argentine academic and policy maker who was the President's Education Minister, from December 2007 to July 2009.

== Life and career ==
Tedesco was born in Buenos Aires in 1944. Enrolling at the University of Buenos Aires, he graduated with a degree in Philosophy and Letters in 1968. He taught as Professor of Educational History in the Universities of La Plata, El Comahue and La Pampa and authored his first book, Education and Society in Argentina, 1800-1945, in 1972.

Tedesco was appointed as an education policy specialist in 1976 for UNESCO's Latin American Development and Education Project. He became Director of UNESCO's Regional Center for Latin American Higher Education in Caracas between 1982 and 1986 and of their Regional Education Center in Santiago between 1986 and 1992. Repression suffered by Argentine educators and students during its last dictatorship led Tedesco to co-author a criticism of the problem, The Authoritarian Educational Agenda, with Cecilia Braslavsky in 1983.

The experience earned him the post of Director of the IBE in Geneva, a position he held until 1997, and as head of the Buenos Aires UNESCO bureau, until 2004. Tedesco returned to Academia, dividing his time between the private Universidad de San Andrés and the public National University of Tres de Febrero, both outside Buenos Aires. He was subsequently appointed to the Federal Teacher Training Commission by Education Minister Daniel Filmus, who replaced Vice Minister Alberto Sileoni with Tedesco in April 2006.

The October 2007 election of Filmus as Senator for the city of Buenos Aires and of Senator Cristina Kirchner as President of Argentina led to Tedesco's swearing-in as Education Minister on 10 December 2007. Following a defeat in the 28 June 2009, mid-term elections and a resulting cabinet shake-up, however, he was replaced on 20 July by Sileoni. Tedesco was made executive director of the Unit of Strategic Planning and Evaluation of the Argentine Educational System, an agency within the Office of the President. Tedesco died in Buenos Aires, Argentina on 8 May 2017 after a long illness. He was 73.
