= Pablo Pizzurno =

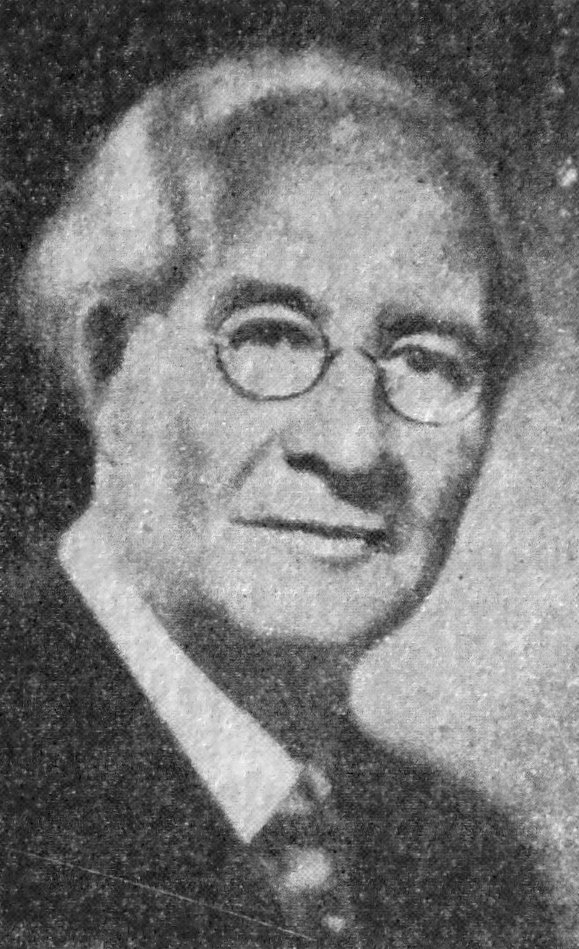
Pablo Pizzurno

Pablo Pizzurno (July 11, 1865 - March 24, 1940) was an Argentine educator who laid the foundations of the national primary education.

== Education and contributions ==
Pizzurno received his master's degree and began teaching in the Normal School in 1882. Two years later he became a school principal in Buenos Aires and integrated the following year at the National College of Buenos Aires. He served in several institutions at once, creating a chair of pedagogy in school subprefects and helpers and lecturing and writing about education in various publications.

In 1887 he was named director of the School of Buenos Aires, and in 1889 he was sent by the National Council on Education to the International Exhibition in Paris. He used the trip to become familiar with the educational techniques used in Europe, which he detailed in several reports and then applied to the creation in 1890 of the National Institute of Primary and Secondary.

In 1893 he founded the magazine The New School Teaching; that vehicle would reform plans such as introducing physical education as part of the curriculum that year. In 1897 he was elected to serve on the commission for renewal of curricula of schools in Buenos Aires, and in 1898 he was appointed inspector of schools under national administration. In 1900, he became the inspector general.

In 1902, Pizzurno presented the report to the Ministry of Education, detailing all study plans and methods applied in the country to date and proposing a comprehensive reform. He worked with the Ministry for the next 30 years, while continuing his work as inspector and writing and teaching.

It is commonly believed that the headquarters of the Ministry of Education is named after Argentine Pizzurno palace in his honor, but the building is called Sarmiento Palace. What is called Pizzurno is the little street that is in front of the headquarters.
