= Somos Buenos Aires =

We are Buenos Aires Somos Buenos Aires
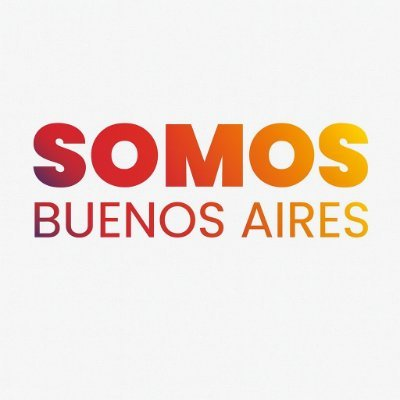
- Leader: Florencio Randazzo; Julio Zamora
- Founded: 2025
- Ideology: Radicalism; Federalism; Peronism; Third Way
- Political position: Center to center-right
- Regional affiliation: Buenos Aires Province
- Colors: #F8F9FA

Somos Buenos Aires (English: We are Buenos Aires) is a centrist Argentine political coalition. It was created in 2025 to compete in the 2025 legislative elections for Buenos Aires Province. The alliance is made up of dissident Peronists, radicals and socialists.

This alliance is represented by figures such as the national deputy for the Province of Buenos Aires, Florencio Randazzo, the mayor of Tigre (2023-2027), Julio Zamora, the provincial deputy, Pablo Domenichini, the Mayor of Junín, Pablo Petrecca, the provincial candidate for the 3rd Section, Agustín Boeri, and other politicians who base their campaign on management and consensus.

== Election results ==
Provincial elections

Year	Votes	%	Senate	Chamber of Deputies
2025	424,671	5.26%	2 / 46	2 / 23
