= José Torello =

Argentine politician

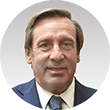

National Senator
- In office 24 February 2022 – 10 December 2023
- Preceded by: Esteban Bullrich
- Constituency: Buenos Aires

Personal details
- Born: José María Torello; 19 February 1960 (age 66) Buenos Aires, Argentina
- Party: Republican Proposal
- Other political affiliations: Juntos por el Cambio (2015–present)

José María Torello (born 19 February 1960) is an Argentine politician. A member of Republican Proposal (PRO), Torello served as National Senator representing Buenos Aires Province from 2022 to 2023, in replacement of Esteban Bullrich.

== Early life ==
Torello was born in Buenos Aires on 19 February 1960 into a wealthy family linked to the agricultural business. He is a grand-nephew of Pablo Miguel Torello (1864–1943), who was Minister of Public Works during the presidency of Hipólito Yrigoyen. His brother is Pablo Torello, also a Republican Proposal politician currently serving as a National Deputy. Torello attended Colegio Cardenal Newman, an elite private boys' school, where he met future president and collaborator Mauricio Macri.

== Career ==
After attaining his law degree, he became part of Llerena y Asociados, a major law firm based in Buenos Aires. He eventually left the firm to work for Mauricio Macri upon his entry into politics in 2003, becoming a founding member of Republican Proposal. Following Macri's election as Chief of Government of Buenos Aires in 2007, Torello became chief of advisors in the city government. Torello was later appointed to the same position in the national government following Macri's election as President of Argentina in 2015.

In the 2017 legislative election, Torello was the first alternate candidate in the Cambiemos list to the National Senate in Buenos Aires Province; the list was headed by education minister Esteban Bullrich. In 2022, following Bullrich's resignation due to health issues, Torello was sworn in as senator, with mandate until 2023.
