= Danya Tavela =

Argentine politician (born 1977)

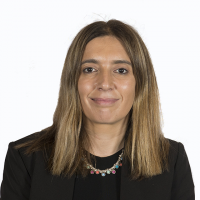
- Tavela in 2021

National Deputy of Argentina
- Incumbent
- Assumed office 10 December 2021
- Constituency: Buenos Aires Province

Secretary of University Policies
- In office 17 July 2017 – 1 November 2018
- President: Mauricio Macri
- Preceded by: Albor Cantard
- Succeeded by: Pablo Domenichini

Undersecretary of Management and Coordination of University Policies
- In office 10 December 2015 – 17 July 2017

Vice-rector of the National University of the Northwest of the Province of Buenos Aires
- In office November 2018 – November 2022

Personal details
- Born: Danya Verónica Tavela; February 8, 1977 (age 49) Junín, Buenos Aires Province, Argentina
- Party: Radical Civic Union
- Other political affiliations: Juntos por el Cambio; Democracy Forever (parliamentary bloc)
- Education: National University of La Plata
- Occupation: Public accountant, academic and politician

Danya Verónica Tavela (born 8 February 1977) is an Argentine public accountant, academic and politician. Since 2021 she has served as a National Deputy for Buenos Aires Province. She previously held senior roles in the national education portfolio—Undersecretary (2015–2017) and then Secretary of University Policies (2017–2018)—and was vice-rector at the National University of the Northwest of the Province of Buenos Aires (UNNOBA).

== Early life and education ==
Tavela was born in Junín, Buenos Aires Province, in 1977. She graduated as a public accountant and later obtained a master's degree in provincial and municipal public finance at the National University of La Plata (UNLP).

== Academic career ==
Tavela developed her career at UNNOBA, where she rose to the vice-rectorate. She was elected vice-rector for the 2015–2019 period (later on leave while serving in national government) and, after leaving the ministry, returned to the post from November 2018 until November 2022, when Florencia Castro was elected vice-rector by the University Council.

== National government ==
Following the 2015 change of administration, Tavela was appointed Undersecretary of Management and Coordination of University Policies at the Ministry of Education, effective 10 December 2015. In July 2017 she was promoted to Secretary of University Policies, a position she held until 1 November 2018, when she left the post and was succeeded by Pablo Domenichini.

During 2018, national university unions staged a prolonged strike that disrupted teaching across more than 50 public universities and involved around 190,000 staff and 1.5 million students; a mass demonstration took place in Buenos Aires on 30 August 2018.

== Parliamentary career ==
Tavela ran for a seat in the Chamber of Deputies on the Progresistas slate in the 2015 elections; the alliance obtained 317,448 votes (3.53%) in Buenos Aires Province and did not win seats.

She was elected National Deputy in 2021 for Buenos Aires Province on the Juntos por el Cambio list and took office on 10 December 2021. In the Chamber she has served as second vice-chair of the Education Committee, and as a member of the Science, Technology and Productive Innovation; Public Works; Justice; and Maritime, River, Fisheries and Port Interests committees, among others.

In 2023 she was a pre-candidate for the regional Parlasur seat for Buenos Aires Province on the list linked to Horacio Rodríguez Larreta and Gerardo Morales; she lost the internal primary to Héctor Gay. That year she was among a small group of opposition deputies who enabled quorum for the debate on changes to the income tax threshold, a move that exposed internal divisions within Juntos por el Cambio and drew criticism from former president Mauricio Macri.

== Publications ==
- La Universidad de Buenos Aires: aportes para la CRES 2018 (with Alberto E. Barbieri), Universidad de Buenos Aires, 2018.
- Futura BA (presentation at the Junín Book Fair, 2025).
