= Oscar Ivanissevich =

Argentine politician and footballer

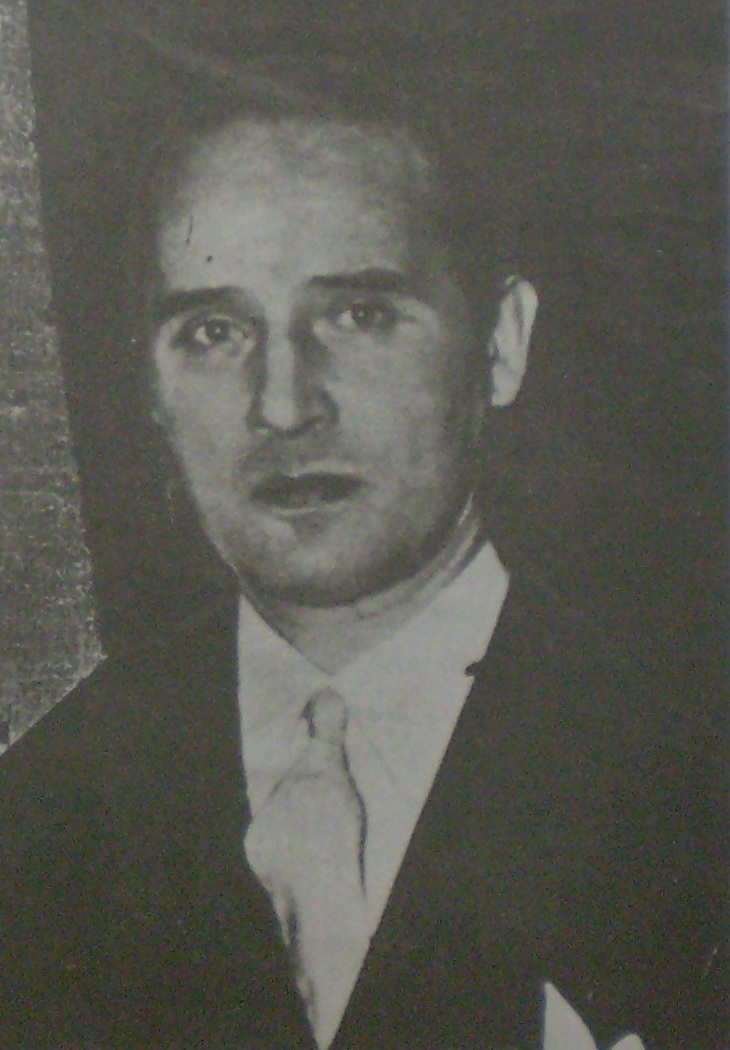

Oscar Ivanissevich (5 August 1895 – 5 June 1976) was an Argentine politician, physician and footballer. He belonged to Peronist Party and is considered the co-author of the Peronist March. He served as Minister of Education in two terms designated by president Juan Domingo Perón, between 1949 and 1950, and by president Isabel Perón, between 1974 and 1975 and was rector of the University of Buenos Aires. Also he served as Argentine Ambassador to the United States between 1946 and 1948. He lived in the "Wings House" on Dosoris Island in Glen Cove, Long Island in 1947 while serving as an Ambassador to the United States.

He was born in Buenos Aires in a Croatian immigrant family to Antonio Ivanissevich and Elena Defilippis. He played football in the Second Division of Argentina in teams such as Kimberley and Estudiantes de Buenos Aires.

He died in Buenos Aires at 81 years.
