= 2025 Buenos Aires provincial election =

- 7 September 2025

46 of the 92 seats in the Chamber of Deputies 23 of the 46 seats in the Senate
- Registered: 14,376,592
- Turnout: 61.04% (▼14.90pp)
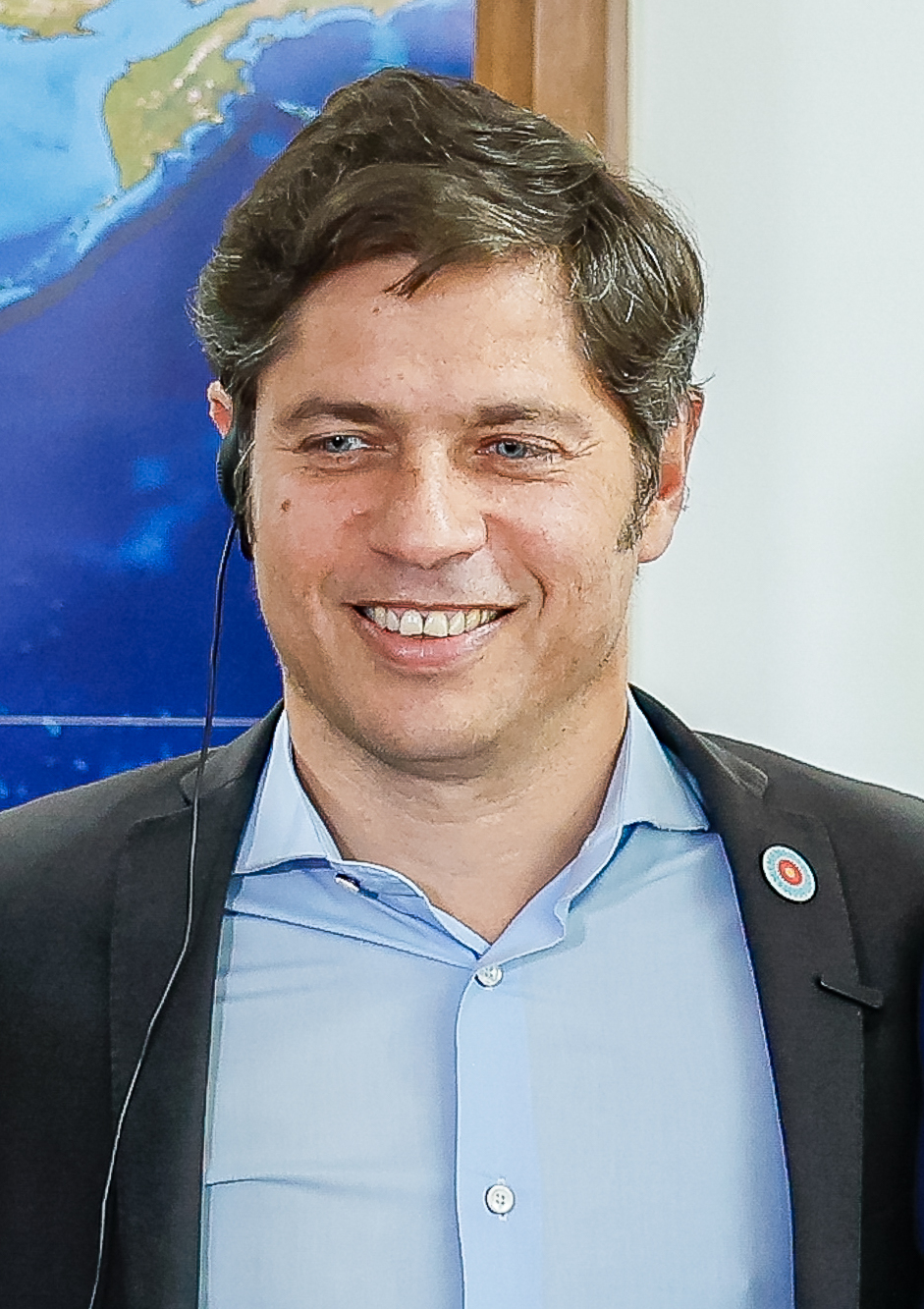

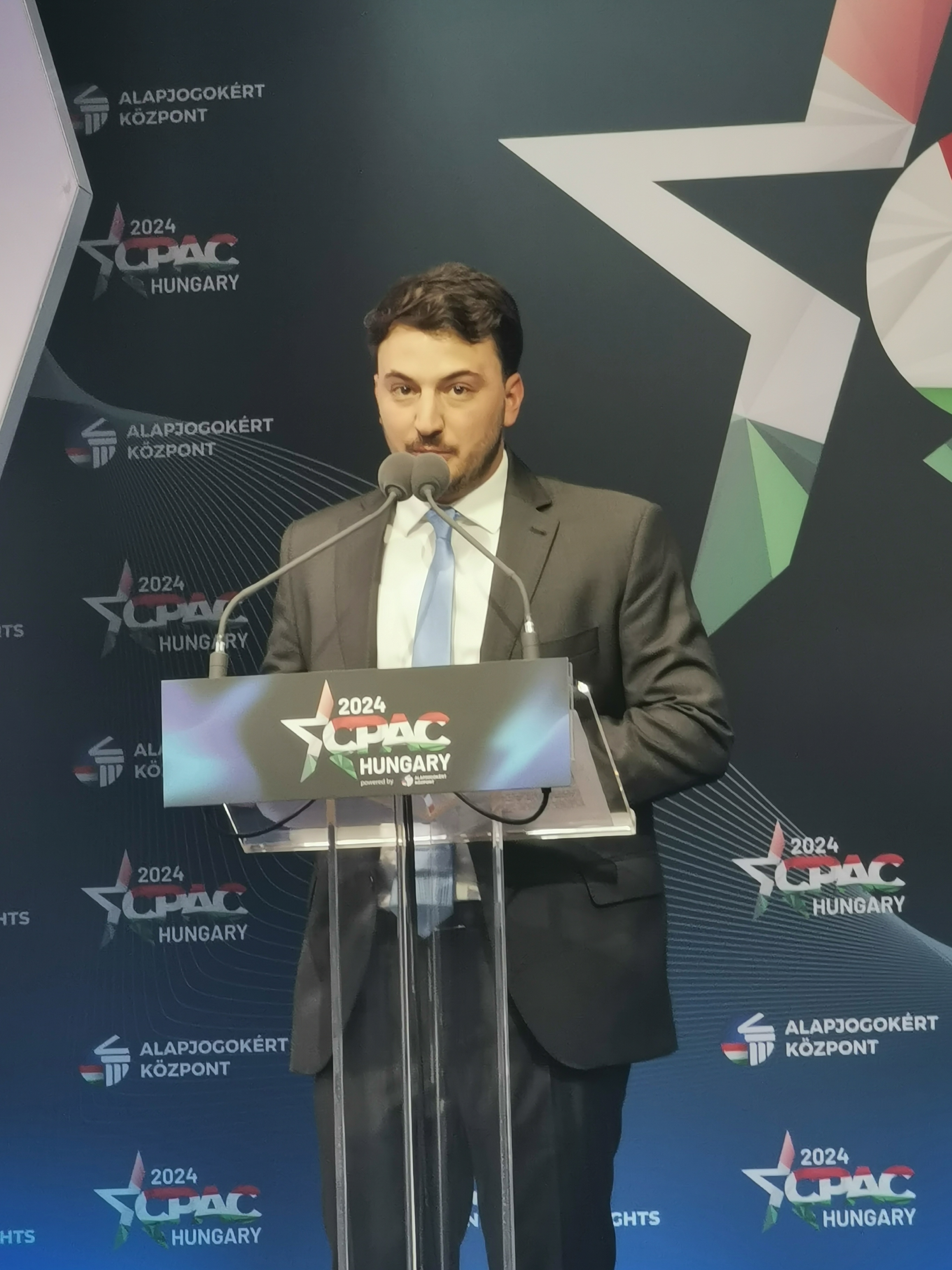

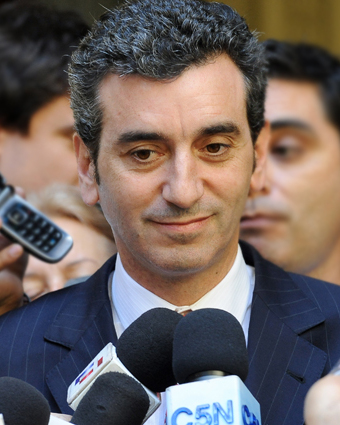
Leader	Axel Kicillof	Agustín Romo	Florencio; Randazzo
Alliance	FP	LLA	SBA
Last election	41.91%	25.34%	did not exist
Seats won	21	18	5
Seat change	▲4	▲5	new
Popular vote	2,065,415	1,272,584	238,708
Percentage	49.65%	30.59%	5.74%
Swing	▲7.74pp	▲5.25pp	new
Leader	None
Alliance	FIT-U
Last election	3.78%
Seats won	2
Seat change	▲2
Popular vote	211,035
Percentage	5.07%
Swing	▲1.29pp

General elections were held in Buenos Aires Province on 7 September 2025, to renew 46 seats in the Chamber of Deputies and 23 in the Senate. In addition, councilors and school counselors were elected in the municipalities of Buenos Aires.

It is the first time since the restoration of democracy in 1983 that the provincial elections in Buenos Aires were held on a date other than the national elections.

The Justicialist Party won 47% of the vote, followed by La Libertad Avanza of President Javier Milei at 34%.

The electoral victory of the left sparked widespread panic across financial markets, causing the peso to plunge by nearly 10% in a matter of hours. This sharp decline was fueled by concerns among investors about the potential downfall of President Javier Milei's pro-market, business-friendly libertarian administration.

== Election schedule ==
Date	Event
July 9, 2025	Deadline for submitting electoral alliances.
July 19, 2025	Deadline for the submission of candidates for provincial deputies and senators.
August 8, 2025	Presentation of party ballots.
September 5, 2025	End of the election campaign period, broadcasting of campaign ads, and publication of polls and election surveys.
September 7, 2025	Holding of provincial elections.

== Positions to Choose From ==
Electoral Section	Chamber of Deputies		Senate	
Electoral Section	Deputies	To be Renewed	Senators	To be Renewed
1	15	—	8	8
2	11	11	5	—
3	18	18	9	—
4	14	—	7	7
5	11	—	5	5
6	11	11	6	—
7	6	—	3	3
8 - Capital	6	6	3	—
Total	92	46	46	23

== Results ==
=== Chamber of Deputies ===
Party	Votes	%	Seats
Fuerza Patria	2,065,415	49.65	21
La Libertad Avanza	1,272,584	30.59	18
Somos Buenos Aires	238,708	5.74	5
Workers' Left Front	211,035	5.07	2
Nuevos Aires	98,534	2.37	–
Unión y Libertad	60,057	1.44	–
Potencia	50,565	1.22	–
Libertarian Party	33,735	0.81	–
Unión Liberal	24,649	0.59	–
Workers' Party	24,034	0.58	–
Movimiento Avanzada Socialista	21,001	0.50	–
Valores Republicanos	16,746	0.40	–
Patriot Front	15,715	0.38	–
Construyendo Porvenir	12,356	0.30	–
Tiempo de Todos	10,658	0.26	–
Es Con Vos, Es Con Nosotros	3,874	0.09	–
Total	4,159,666	100.00	46
Valid votes	4,159,666	95.01	
Invalid/blank votes	218,614	4.99	
Total votes	4,378,280	100.00	
Registered voters/turnout	7,075,220	61.88	

=== Senate ===
Party	Votes	%	Seats
Fuerza Patria	1,796,073	44.95	13
La Libertad Avanza	1,482,513	37.11	8
Somos Buenos Aires	280,012	7.01	2
Workers' Left Front	144,761	3.62	–
Potencia	60,177	1.51	–
Unión y Libertad	50,808	1.27	–
Unión Liberal	29,841	0.75	–
Libertarian Party	24,956	0.62	–
Workers' Party	21,561	0.54	–
Es Con Vos, Es Con Nosotros	20,152	0.50	–
Partido Valores Republicanos	18,093	0.45	–
Movimiento Avanzada Socialista	17,604	0.44	–
Construyendo Porvenir	16,819	0.42	–
Patriot Front	14,927	0.37	–
Tiempo de Todos	11,651	0.29	–
Nuevos Aires	5,428	0.14	–
Total	3,995,376	100.00	23
Valid votes	3,995,376	90.88	
Invalid/blank votes	401,132	9.12	
Total votes	4,396,508	100.00	
Registered voters/turnout	7,301,372	60.21	

== See also ==
- 2025 Buenos Aires City elections
- 2025 Argentine provincial elections
- 2025 Argentine legislative election
