= Alejandro Finocchiaro =

Argentine politician (born 1967)

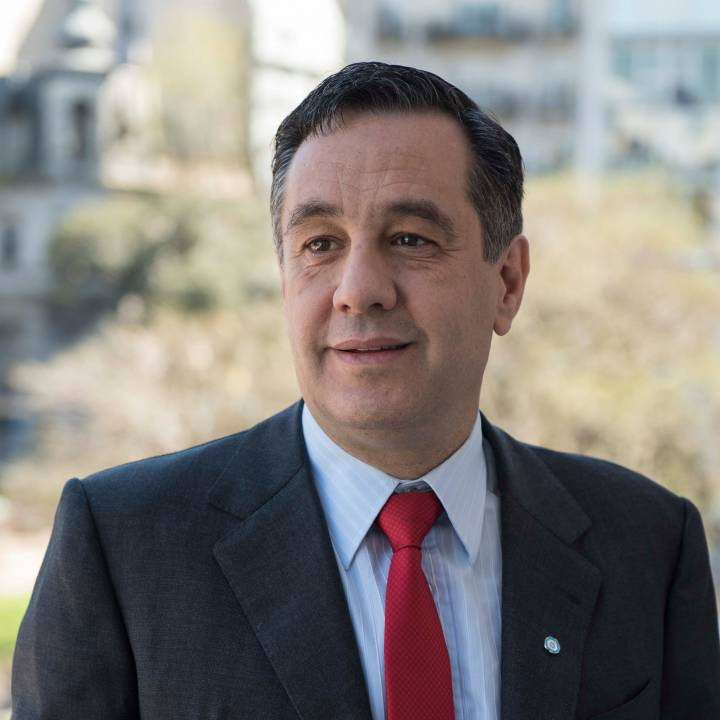
- Finocchiaro in 2018

National Deputy
- Incumbent
- Assumed office 10 December 2021
- Constituency: Buenos Aires

Minister of Education
- In office 17 July 2017 – 10 December 2019
- President: Mauricio Macri
- Preceded by: Esteban Bullrich
- Succeeded by: Nicolás Trotta

Personal details
- Born: 27 August 1967 (age 59) San Fernando Partido, Argentina
- Party: Republican Proposal
- Other political affiliations: Cambiemos (2015–present)
- Education: University of Buenos Aires, University of San Andrés
- Occupation: Lawyer

Alejandro Oscar Finocchiaro (born 27 August 1967) is an Argentine lawyer and politician who served as Minister of Education, Culture, Science and Technology of Argentina. Previously he was general director of Culture and Education of the province of Buenos Aires and Secretary of Educational Policies and Teaching Career in the Autonomous City of Buenos Aires. Since 2021, he has been a National Deputy elected in Buenos Aires Province.

== Early life and education ==
Finocchiaro was born in San Fernando, Argentina to a family of Italian descent. In his childhood he also lived in Chivilcoy, Vicente López and Villa Constructora.

Finocchiaro is a graduate of the University of Buenos Aires (UBA) and has a master's degree in education from the University of San Andrés. He also holds a doctorate in history from the Universidad del Salvador.

== Academic career ==
Finocchiaro is an associate professor of state theory at UBA Law School, head of contemporary international policy at the University of Business and Social Sciences (UCES), and professor of political law at the National University of La Matanza (UNLaM); he served as Dean of the College of Law and Political Science at the latter institution from 2004 to 2011.

Finocchiaro has authored the books UBA c / Estado Nacional. A study on university autonomy and El mito reformista, as well as articles on international politics, education, history, and political philosophy.

== Political career ==
Between 2011 and 2015, Finocchiaro served as Secretary of Educational Policies and Teaching Career in the Autonomous City of Buenos Aires. In December 2015 he was appointed by governor María Eugenia Vidal as general director of Culture and Education of the province of Buenos Aires.

Since July 2017 he has served as Argentina's Minister of education. Shortly after assuming his post, he decided to reduce the Our School program by canceling the plan that allowed thousands of teachers across the country to access a free postgraduate course through online training courses, starting in January 2018 with the closing of three posts. At the same time, the decree eliminated the national parity of teachers, which caused conflicts in several provinces. The conflict led to a strike and suspended the teaching of classes in the 57 national universities, covering 190,000 teachers and 1.6 million students, in addition to the 3,000 million pesos cut in public universities.

In September 2018, after the reduction of ministries implemented by President Mauricio Macri, Finocchiaro was put in charge of the Ministry of Education, Culture, Science and Technology, absorbing the former ministries of Culture and of Science, Technology and Productive Innovation.

In 2019, he ran for mayor of La Matanza as part of the Juntos por el Cambio coalition.

== Minister of Education ==
During his tenure, 19,000 schools were connected to the internet, and programming and robotics were introduced into the kindergarten curriculum.

During his tenure, the United Nations Educational, Scientific and Cultural Organization (UNESCO) highlighted progress that made Argentina an "emerging leader" in education. In 2018, he pointed to Argentina as one of the five countries in the world that had made the greatest progress in digital literacy and in 2019 in a document entitled "Artificial Intelligence in education: challenges and opportunities for sustainable development", highlights the Learn Connected program that promoted the Ministry of Education.

== Controversy ==
On 27 June 2019, Finocchiaro strongly condemned a school in Chaco Province which displayed a Cuban flag on Argentina's Flag Day labeling the Cuban regime as "What differences are there between the regime of Cuba and Nazism?". He also described Che Guevara as a "criminal and genocider".

Days later he recalled that the school was indoctrinating children with "communism and ideologies of totalitarian and populist governments"; he further said the school would be reviewed.

== Other activities ==
Finocchiaro is Argentina's ambassador to the Working Group on International Cooperation for Education, Remembrance and Holocaust Research at the International Holocaust Remembrance Alliance. Finocchiaro produced the 2008 documentary Mujeres de la Shoá ("Women of the Holocaust") in a joint production of the Holocaust Museum of Buenos Aires and the UNLaM.

== Awards ==
During the ceremony of August 30, 2017, Alejandro Finocchiaro received the Outstanding Graduate award from the University of San Andrés (UdeSA) for being a student of that university who reached the position of Minister of Education.

== Publications ==
Alejandro Finocchiaro is the author or co-author of works related to his specialty.

A study on university autonomy (1st edition). I promise Books. 2004. ISBN 978-950-9217-76-8.

The reformist myth (1st edition). Eudeba 2014. ISBN 978-950-23-2240-7.

There is only one way, education (1st edition). Planet. 2018. ISBN 978-950-49-5978-6. Participation in collective work.
