= Colegio del Salvador =

Location
- Callao 542; Buenos Aires; Argentina
- Coordinates: 34°36′10″S 58°23′34″W

Information
- Type: Private pre-school, primary and secondary school
- Motto: With Jesus, for the family and for peace
- Religious affiliation: Catholicism
- Denomination: Jesuit
- Established: 1868; 158 years ago
- Rector: Ricardo Moscato
- Teaching staff: 180
- Grades: Pre-K-12
- Gender: Boys
- Enrollment: 1,159
- Website: www.colegiodelsalvador.esc.edu.ar

Colegio del Salvador is a private Catholic pre-school, primary, and secondary school for boys located in Buenos Aires, Argentina. The school was founded by the Society of Jesus in 1868.

== Notable alumni ==
- Natalio R. Botana – political scientist and historian.
- Carlos Octavio Bunge – sociologist, writer and lawyer.
- Oscar Camilión – politician, lawyer and diplomat; served as Minister of Defense from December 1993 to August 1996.
- Ivo Cutzarida – actor, politician, and director of films and soap operas.
- Enrique Finochietto – a distinguished Argentine academic, physician, and inventor.
- Joaquin Galan – singer, actor, composer and producer. Also known for being part of the famous duo Pimpinela.
- Manuel Gálvez – novelist, poet, essayist, historian and biographer.
- Julio Grondona – football executive who served as the president of the Argentine Football Association and as a Senior Vice-president of FIFA.
- Juan José Llach – economist and sociologist. Professor and researcher of Universidad Austral. Member of the Pontifical Academy of Social Sciences since 1994 and of the national academies of Education since 2003 and Economics since 2007. He also served as the Secretary of Economic Policy between December 1991 and August 1996 and as the Minister of Education from December 1999 to October 2000
- Felix Luna – prominent writer, lyricist, and historian.
- Francisco Diego Maciel – retired football player.
- Salvador Oría – lawyer who focused his career on economics; served as the Minister of Public Works during Ramón Castillo presidency.
- Alejandro Posadas – physician and surgeon specializing in pediatric surgery. He was the first person to film an operation. He brought the first x-ray machine to Argentina.
- Julio César Saguier – lawyer and politician; former Mayor of Buenos Aires.

== Notable faculty ==
- Pope Francis – as Jorge Mario Bergoglio, taught literature and psychology and served as a spiritual director and confessor.
- Ismael Quiles – a Spanish philosopher and Jesuit priest who was the main promoter of East Asian studies in Argentina; founded the School of Oriental Studies at the Universidad del Salvador.
- Guillermo Furlong – Jesuit priest and historian; Member of the National Academy of History of Argentina.

== Controversy ==
Ten former students denounce sexual abuse at the Jesuit school where the Pope was a teacher

== See also ==
- Catholic Church in Argentina
- Education in Argentina
- List of Jesuit schools
