= Juan José Llach =

Argentinian economist (1945–2025)

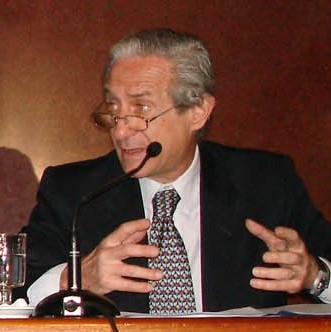
Juan Llach

Juan José Llach (7 February 1945 – 21 April 2025) was an Argentine economist and sociologist. He was a Member of Pontifical Academy of Social Sciences (1994–2019) and of the National Academies of Education (2003–2025) and Economics (2007–2025). He also served as Secretary of Economic Policy between December 1991 and August 1996 and Minister of Education of Argentina from December 1999 to October 2000, designated by president Fernando de la Rúa.

== Background ==
Llach was born in Buenos Aires on 7 February 1945. He attended high school at Colegio del Salvador. Llach earned a degree in Sociology at the Pontifical Catholic University of Argentina and then another degree in Economy at the University of Buenos Aires.

Llach died on 21 April 2025, at the age of 80.
