= Pablo Torello =

Argentine politician

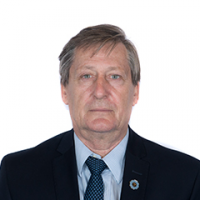

National Deputy
- In office 10 December 2015 – 10 December 2023
- Constituency: Buenos Aires

Personal details
- Born: 12 February 1959 (age 67) Buenos Aires, Argentina
- Party: Republican Proposal
- Other political affiliations: Juntos por el Cambio (2015–present)

Pablo Torello (born 12 February 1959) is an Argentine politician, who served as National Deputy representing Buenos Aires Province from 2015 to 2023. A member of Republican Proposal, Torello was first elected in 2015. He previously served as a member of the City Council of Bragado from 2013 to 2015.

== Early life and career ==
Torello was born on 12 February 1959 in Buenos Aires. He is a grand-nephew of Pablo Miguel Torello (1864–1943), who was Minister of Public Works during the presidency of Hipólito Yrigoyen. His brother, José Torello, is also a Republican Proposal politician and currently serves as a Senator for Buenos Aires. Torello is married to María Patricia Medina.

From 2008 to 2009 he led the Bragado chapter of the Sociedad Rural Argentina (SRA), and served in the SRA directive board from 2003 to 2013.

== Political career ==
Torello was a member of the City Council of Bragado from 2013 to 2015. He ran for a seat in the Argentine Chamber of Deputies in the 2015 general election; he was the 12th candidate in the Republican Proposal list in Buenos Aires Province. The list received 33.75% of the votes, and Torello was elected. He was re-elected in 2019, this time as the 13th candidate in the Juntos por el Cambio list.

As a national deputy, Torello formed part of the parliamentary commissions on Agriculture and Livestock, Consumer Rights, Communications, Economy, Industry, and Budgets. He was a vocal opponent of the legalization of abortion in Argentina, voting against the two Voluntary Interruption of Pregnancy bills that were debated by the Argentine Congress in 2018 and 2020. In 2020, before the second bill passed the Argentine Congress, Torello threatened to denounce the bill for unconstitutionality should it become law.

In 2019, he caused controversy when, on his official Twitter account, he replied affirmatively to a tweet stating that "feminist women are unfuckable".
