= Ricardo Bruera =

Argentine politician (1932–2025)

Minister of Education
- In office 29 March 1976 – 28 May 1977
- President: Jorge Rafael Videla
- Preceded by: César Augusto Guzzetti
- Succeeded by: Juan José Catalán

Personal details
- Born: Ricardo Pedro Bruera; 10 April 1932; Rosario, Santa Fe Province, Argentima
- Died: 21 August 2025 (aged 93); Rosario, Santa Fe Province, Argentina
- Political party: Independent
- Education: National University of Rosario
- Occupation: Academic

Ricardo Pedro Bruera (10 April 1932 – 21 August 2025) was an Argentine politician. An independent, he served as Minister of Education from 1976 to 1977.

Bruera died in Rosario on 21 August 2025, at the age of 93.
