= Nicolás Trotta =

Argentine politician

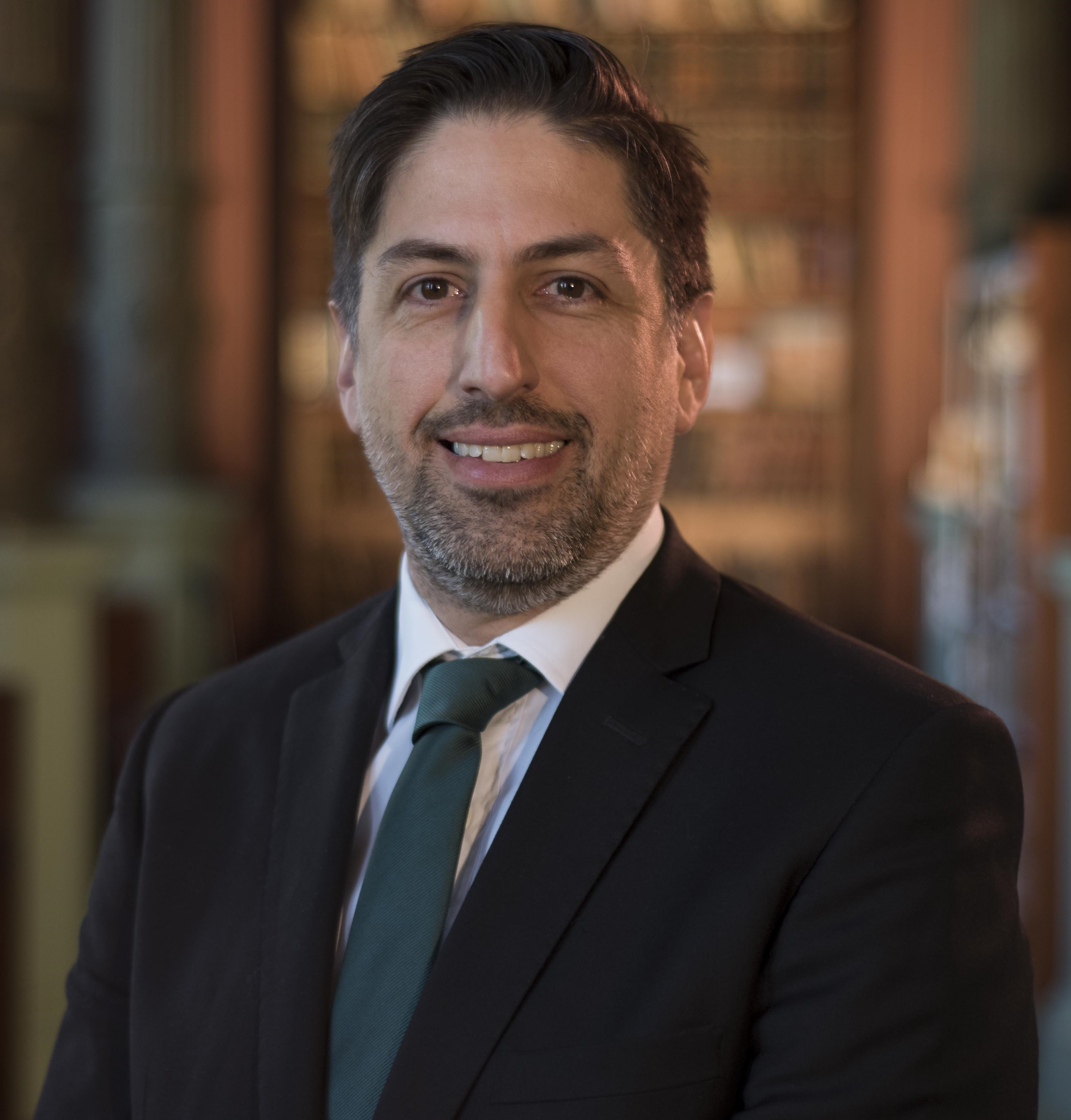

Minister of Education
- In office 10 December 2019 – 20 September 2021
- President: Alberto Fernández
- Preceded by: Alejandro Finocchiaro
- Succeeded by: Jaime Perczyk

Undersecretary of Administrative Technologies
- In office 10 December 2007 – 6 August 2009
- Preceded by: Office created
- Succeeded by: Eduardo Thill

Personal details
- Born: Nicolás Alfredo Trotta; 20 January 1976 (age 50) Buenos Aires, Argentina
- Party: Independent (since 2004); New Leadership (1997–2004)
- Other political affiliations: Front for Victory (2004–2009); Frente de Todos (2019–present)
- Education: University of Belgrano

Nicolás Alfredo Trotta (Spanish pronunciation: [nikoˈlas alˈfɾeðo ˈtɾota]; born 20 January 1976) is an Argentine politician. He was Argentina's Minister of Education from 10 December 2019 to 20 September 2021, in the cabinet of President Alberto Fernández.

From 2014 to 2019, he was rector of the Metropolitan University for Education and Labour (UMET), the private university of the Doorkeepers' Union (SUTERH). Before that, from 2007 to 2009, he was Undersecretary of Administrative Technologies, reporting directly to the Chief of the Cabinet of Ministers – first Alberto Fernández, then Sergio Massa, and finally Aníbal Fernández. He was also briefly director of YPF, Argentina's main oil and gas company.

== Early life and education ==
Nicolás Alfredo Trotta was born on 20 January 1976 in Buenos Aires. He studied law at the University of Belgrano and is yet to present his dissertation for a master's degree in education from the University of Buenos Aires's Faculty of Philosophy and Letters.

== Political career ==
Trotta's political career began in the New Leadership party, founded by Gustavo Béliz. Trotta worked as an advisor in the New Leadership parliamentary group at the Buenos Aires City Legislature from 1997 to 2000. He had run for a seat in the City Legislature in the New Leadership list alongside, among others, Alberto Fernández, but failed to be elected. In 2000 he was appointed director of the parliamentary commission on economic development, Mercosur affairs and employment policy.

Early into the presidency of Néstor Kirchner, for whom Fernández served as Chief of the Cabinet of Ministers, Trotta became the coordinator of the youth organization Jóvenes K. In 2004, Trotta was appointed director of the National School of Governance, which operated during Kirchner's presidency.

From 2007 to 2009 he was Undersecretary of Administrative Technologies, reporting directly to the Chief of Cabinet; he served under Alberto Fernández, Sergio Massa and Aníbal Fernández. He was succeeded in the position by Eduardo Thill. In 2014, he became rector of the Metropolitan University of Education and Labour (Spanish: Universidad Metropolitana para la Educación y el Trabajo; UMET), the private university of the Doorkeepers' Union (Spanish: Sindicato Único de Trabajadores de Edificios de Renta y Horizontal; SUTERH) headed by Buenos Aires City Justicialist Party president Víctor Santa María. As rector of the UMET, he co-founded the Workers' Innovation Centre (CITRA), co-sponsored by the CONICET.

For six months from 2015 to 2016 he was director of Yacimientos Petrolíferos Fiscales, Argentina's main energy company.

=== Minister of Education ===
On 6 December 2019, President-elect Alberto Fernández announced that Trotta would succeed Alejandro Finocchiaro and lead the Ministry of Education. He took office on 10 December 2019, alongside the rest of the cabinet. Trotta was replaced by Jaime Perczyk on 20 September 2021 as part of a cabinet reshuffle, following the government's poor showings in the 2021 legislative primary elections.

Political offices
Preceded by New post	Undersecretary of Administrative Technologies; 2007–2009	Succeeded by Eduardo Thill
Preceded by Alejandro Finocchiaro	Minister of Education; 2019–2021	Succeeded by Jaime Perczyk
