= Esteban Bullrich =

Argentine politician (born 1969)

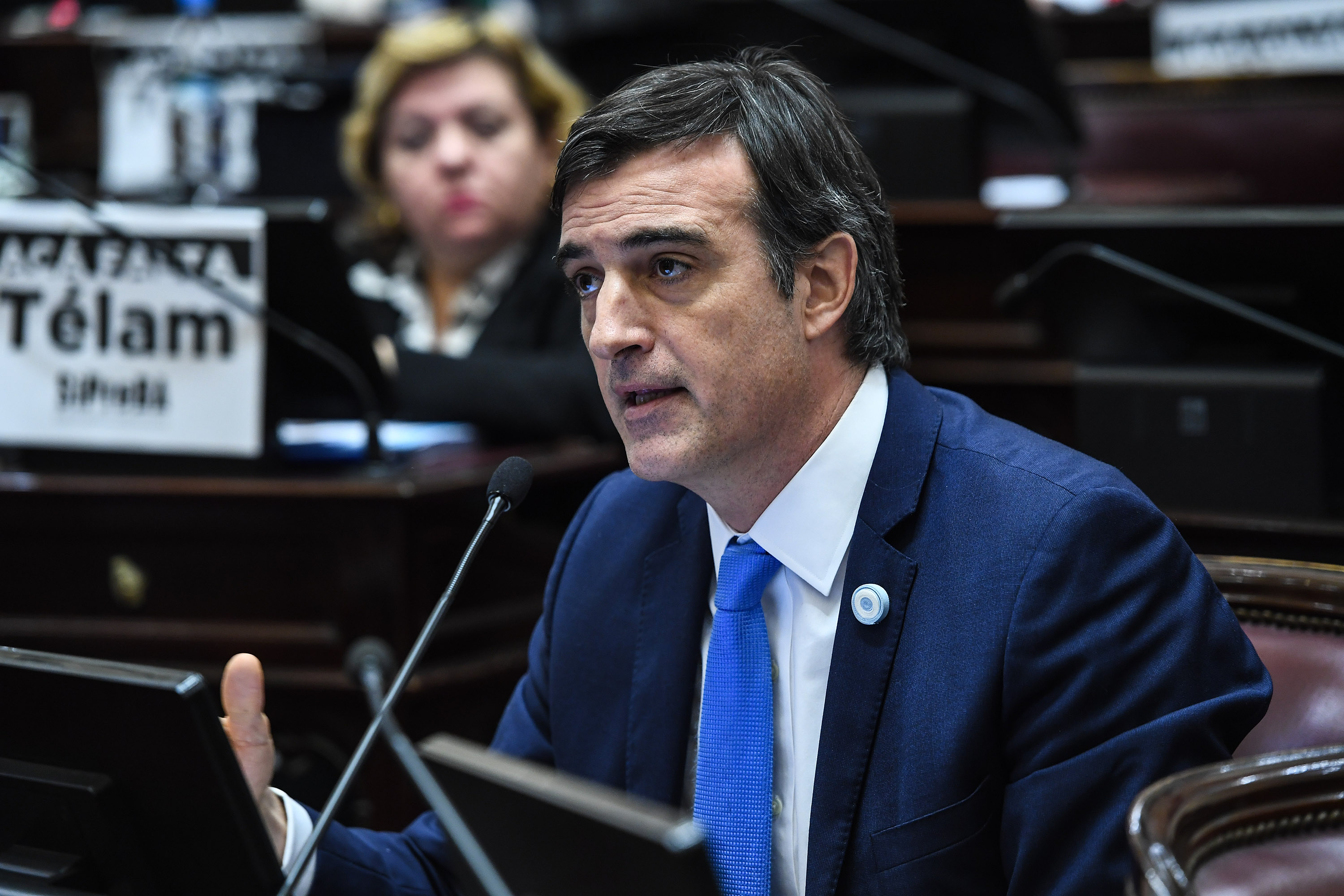

National Senator
- In office 10 December 2017 – 10 December 2021
- Succeeded by: José María Torello
- Constituency: Buenos Aires

Minister of Education
- In office 10 December 2015 – 17 July 2017
- President: Mauricio Macri
- Preceded by: Alberto Sileoni
- Succeeded by: Alejandro Finocchiaro

National Deputy
- In office 10 December 2005 – 31 August 2010
- Constituency: City of Buenos Aires

Personal details
- Born: Esteban José Bullrich; 26 May 1969 (age 57) Buenos Aires, Argentina
- Party: Republican Proposal (2009–present); Recreate for Growth (2002–2009)
- Other political affiliations: Juntos por el Cambio (2015–present)
- Relations: Patricia Bullrich (second cousin)
- Occupation: Politician

Esteban José Bullrich (born 20 May 1969, Buenos Aires) is an Argentine politician. A member of Republican Proposal (PRO), he served as a National Senator for Buenos Aires Province from 2017 to 2021, and as Minister of Education from 2015 to 2017, during the presidency of Mauricio Macri. Prior to that, he served as education minister of the Autonomous City of Buenos Aires, also under Macri, and as a National Deputy from 2005 to 2010.

He resigned from his seat in the Senate in 2021 due to the worsening of his amyotrophic lateral sclerosis. His vacancy was filled by José Torello. He is a now an advocate for ALS-related causes, including setting up a foundation to advance the cause of education and research in the area.

== Early life and education ==
Bullrich was born and raised in the city of Buenos Aires. After completing his bachelor's degree, Bullrich began his graduate studies in the United States at the Kellogg School of Management of Northwestern University in Evanston, Illinois. He was just 24 years old when he entered the program. At Kellogg he focused on human relations and organizational studies. After receiving his MBA Bullrich spent two months teaching mathematics to orphans in Nicaragua through the Padre Fabretto Foundation; he writes on his blog estebanbullrich.com that this experience "left a profound effect on me with regards to how a good education can help a child develop and achieve a more prosperous adult life" [quote translated from Spanish].

== Political career ==
Bullrich began his political career in 2003 when he ran for a seat in the Buenos Aires City Legislature for the Recreate for Growth party (Recrear), later becoming vice-president of the party for the Buenos Aires District. In office, he has organized and led efforts to improve the Argentine education system. In 2005, he was elected to the National Chamber of Deputies, representing the Autonomous City of Buenos Aires. Bullrich caucused with the PRO alliance, a center-right political bloc. Bullrich and PRO are also allied with political blocs Commitment to Change and Recrear.

In 2006 Bullrich was recognized as an Eisenhower Fellow in its Multi Nation Program 2006. This experience enabled him to meet American policy makers and study the US educational system with special attention on charter schools.

Bullrich has been in the press serving as an opposition congressman in the Skanska corruption case where the Swedish construction and development company allegedly over-charged the Argentine government for the construction of a pipeline in northern Argentina.

In 2007, Bullrich took leave from the chamber of deputies to become interim Minister of Social Development of the Autonomous City of Buenos Aires. He officially resigned to the chamber of deputies in 2009, a few months before the end his term.

On December 22, 2009, after the resignation of Abel Posse, it was announced that Bullrich would become Minister of Education of the Autonomous City of Buenos Aires. He took office on January 5, 2010. During his tenure, he reduced subsidies to private schools to increase teacher salaries in public schools by around 29% and closed 221 classes in order to merge them and decrease inefficiencies. During his administration launched the Sarmiento Plan, in order to give laptops to students and teachers.

=== Minister of Education and Election to the Senate ===
Mauricio Macri became president in 2015, and announced that he would be his minister of education. His mandate ended in 2017, after he became a senator. He was replaced by Alejandro Finocchiaro.

In 2017, Bullrich ran for Senator of the Buenos Aires province, leading the Cambiemos Party ticket. His list defeated the Citizen's Unity list, led by Cristina Fernández de Kirchner by a little more than four percentage points. 1Pais, led by Sergio Massa, was third.

As a senator, he opposed the national campaign for the decriminalization of abortion in 2018, stating religious arguments to do so.

In 2021, Bullrich was diagnosed with ALS. Due to his illness, he resigned from the Senate in December of that year.
