= Cecilia Braslavsky =

Argentine educator, pedagogue, and author

Cecilia Braslavsky (5 January 1952 – 1 June 2005) was an Argentine educator, pedagogue, and author. She served as Director-General of Educational Research in the Argentine Ministry of Education and Director of UNESCO's International Bureau of Education.

Braslavsky was born in Buenos Aires in 1952. She received degrees from the University of Buenos Aires and University of Leipzig (Ph.D.). She was a professor at the University of Buenos Aires, Educational Coordinator of the Latin American Social Sciences Faculty (1984–92), Coordinator of the Argentine Basic Contents Programme (1993), Director-General of Educational Research in the Argentine Ministry of Education (1994), and she was appointed Director of UNESCO's International Bureau of Education in 2000. A prolific writer, her essay Rehaciendo escuelas: hacia un nuevo paradigma en la educación latino-americana (1999), received the Andrès Bello Award for Latin American Thought. She died of cancer in Geneva, Switzerland in 2005.

== Selected works ==
- Braslavsky, C. y Halil, K. (2005). Textbooks and Education for All: Research findings and lessons learnt. UNESCO: IBE.
- Braslavsky, C. (2004). Diez factores para una educación de calidad para todos en el siglo XXI. Documento básico de la XIX Semana Monográfica de la Educación - Educación de calidad para todos: Iniciativas Iberoamericanas. Madrid: Fundación Santillana.
- Braslavsky, C.; Acosta, F. y Jabif, L. (2004). Directores en Acción - Módulos de formación en competencias para la gestión escolar en contextos de pobreza. Buenos Aires : IIPE/UNESCO Buenos Aires.
- Braslavsky, C.; Abdoulaye, A. y Patiño, M. I. (2003). Développement curriculaire et “bonne pratique” en éducation. UNESCO : BIE, Serie de Documents du BIE – 2.
- Braslavsky, C. y Acosta, F. (2001). El estado de la enseñanza de la formación en gestión y políticas educativa en América latina [The state of teacher training in educational management and policies in latin America]. Buenos Aires: IIEP.
- Braslavsky, C. (2001). La educación secundaria. ¿Cambio o inmutabilidad ? Análisis y debate de proceso europeos y latinoamericanos contemporáneos [Secondary education: changeable or immutable? Analysis and debate of the contemporary European and Latin American process]. Buenos Aires: IIEP.
- Braslavsky, C. (2001). As nova tendências mundiais e as mudanças curriculares na educação secundária latino-americana na década de 90 [New worldwide tendencies and curricular changes in Latin-American secondary education in the 90's decade], Serie Educaçao, vol. 8. Brasilia : Cadernos UNESCO Brasil.
- Braslavsky, C. (1999). Re-haciendo escuelas: Hacia un nuevo paradigma en la educación latinoamericana [Remaking schools: towards a new paradigm in Latin American education]. Buenos Aires: Santillana.
- Braslavsky, C. y Tiramonti, G. (1990). Conducción educativa y calidad de la enseñanza media. Buenos Aires: FLACSO‑Miño y Dávila.
- Braslavsky, C.; Cunha, L.A.; Filgueira, C. y Lemez, R. (1989). La educación en la transición democrática: los casos de Argentina, Brasil y Uruguay. Santiago de Chile: OREALC‑UNESCO.
- Braslavsky, C. (1987). La juventud argentina: informe de situación. Buenos Aires: CEAL.
- Braslavsky, C. (1985). La discriminación educativa en la Argentina. Buenos Aires: GEL‑ FLACSO.
- Braslavsky, C. (1984). Mujer y educación. Santiago de Chile: OREALC‑UNESCO.
- Tedesco, J.C.; Braslavsky, C. y Carciofi, R. (1983). El proyecto educativo autoritario. Argentina 1976‑1982. Buenos Aires: FLACSO. Reprint GEL‑FLACSO, 1985. Reprint Miño y Dávila S.R.L., 1986.
