= Secretariat of Education (Argentina) =

- Secretaría de Educación
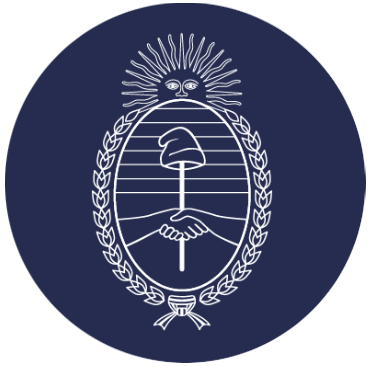

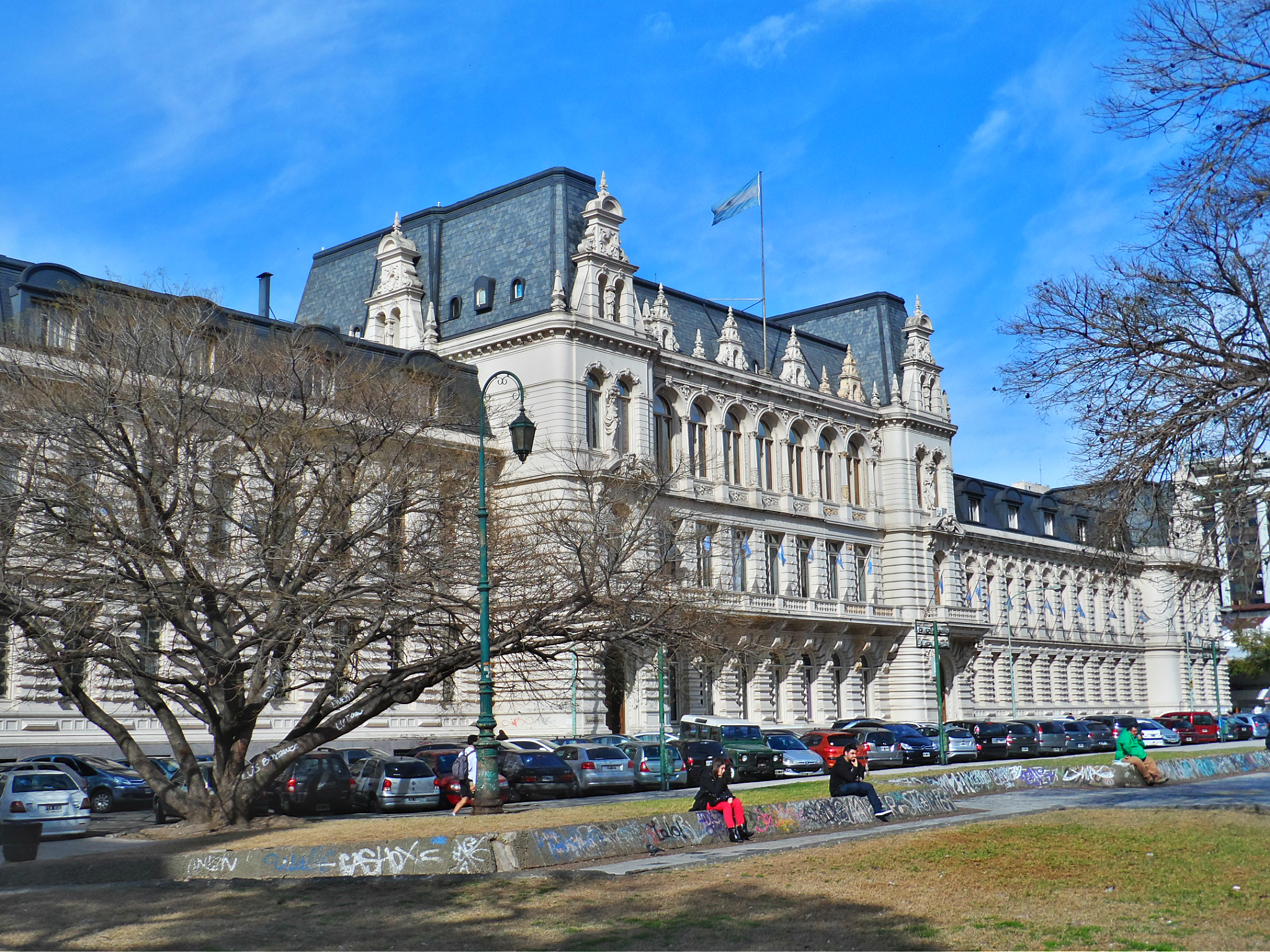
- Palacio Sarmiento, headquarters

Secretariat overview
- Formed: 1949; 77 years ago
- Preceding Secretariat: Ministry of Justice and Public Instruction
- Superseding Secretariat: Ministry of Human Capital
- Jurisdiction: Government of Argentina
- Headquarters: Palacio Sarmiento, Buenos Aires
- Annual budget: $ 397,168,460,932 (2021)
- Secretariat executive: Carlos Torrendell, Secretary
- Website: argentina.gob.ar/educacion

The Secretariat of Education (Spanish: Secretaría de Educación, formerly Ministry of Education) of Argentina is a secretariat and former ministry of the national executive power that oversaw education policies on all educational levels, alongside the governments of the twenty-three provinces of Argentina and the City of Buenos Aires.

The Ministry was founded in 1949, when the state's education portfolio was split from the Ministry of Justice and Public Instruction in the first cabinet of President Juan Domingo Perón; the first minister was Oscar Ivanissevich.

After president Javier Milei dissolved the Ministry of Education turning it into a secretariat, Carlos Torrendell was appointed secretary. The secretariat is controlled by the Ministry of Human Capital.

The secretariat of Education is headquartered at the Sarmiento Palace, popularly known as "Pizzurno Palace" due to its location on Pasaje Pizzurno, in the Buenos Aires neighbourhood of Recoleta.

== List of ministers and secretaries ==
No.	Minister	Party	Term	President
Ministry of Education (1949–1956)
1	Oscar Ivanissevich	Peronist Party	11 March 1949 – 11 May 1950	Juan Domingo Perón
2	Armando Méndez San Martín	Peronist Party	11 May 1950 – 29 June 1955	Juan Domingo Perón
3	Francisco Marcos Anglada	Peronist Party	29 June 1955 – 21 September 1955	Juan Domingo Perón
4	Atilio Dell'Oro Maini	Christian Democratic Party	21 September 1955 – 17 May 1956	Eduardo Lonardi
4	Atilio Dell'Oro Maini	Christian Democratic Party	21 September 1955 – 17 May 1956	Pedro Eugenio Aramburu
Ministry of Education and Justice (1949–1956)
5	Carlos Adrogué	Radical Civic Union	8 June 1956 – 25 January 1957	Pedro Eugenio Aramburu
6	Acdel Ernesto Salas	Independent	25 January 1957 – 1 May 1958	Pedro Eugenio Aramburu
7	Luis Rafael Mac Kay	Radical Civic Union	1 May 1958 – 26 March 1962	Arturo Frondizi
8	Miguel Sussini	Intransigent Radical Civic Union	26 March 1962 – 29 March 1962	Arturo Frondizi
8	Miguel Sussini	Intransigent Radical Civic Union	29 March 1962 – 19 October 1962	José María Guido
9	Alberto Rodríguez Galán	Independent	11 October 1962 – 15 May 1963	José María Guido
10	José Mariano Astigueta	Independent	15 May 1963 – 12 October 1963	José María Guido
11	Carlos Alconada Aramburú	Radical Civic Union	12 October 1963 – 28 June 1966	Arturo Illia
Ministry of Education (1966–1973)
12	Carlos María Gelly y Obes	Independent	28 June 1966 – 4 June 1967	Juan Carlos Onganía
13	José Mariano Astigueta	Independent	4 June 1967 – 23 October 1969	Juan Carlos Onganía
14	Dardo Pérez Guilhou	Independent	23 October 1969 – 8 June 1970	Juan Carlos Onganía
15	José Luis Cantini	Independent	8 June 1970 – 23 March 1971	Roberto Marcelo Levingston
16	Gustavo Malek	Independent	23 March 1971 – 25 May 1973	Alejandro Lanusse
Ministry of Culture and Education (1973)
17	Jorge Alberto Taiana	Justicialist Party	25 May 1973 – 13 July 1973	Héctor Cámpora
Ministry of Education (1973–1981)
17	Jorge Alberto Taiana	Justicialist Party	13 July 1973 – 14 August 1974	Raúl Lastiri
17	Jorge Alberto Taiana	Justicialist Party	13 July 1973 – 14 August 1974	Juan Domingo Perón
17	Jorge Alberto Taiana	Justicialist Party	13 July 1973 – 14 August 1974	Isabel Perón
18	Oscar Ivanissevich	Justicialist Party	14 August 1974 – 11 August 1975	Isabel Perón
19	Pedro J. Arrighi	Justicialist Party	11 August 1975 – 24 March 1976	Isabel Perón
20	Ricardo P. Bruera	Independent	29 March 1976 – 28 May 1977	Jorge Rafael Videla
21	Juan José Catalán	Independent	28 May 1977 – 26 August 1977	Jorge Rafael Videla
22	Juan Rafael Llerena Amadeo	Independent	26 August 1977 – 29 March 1981	Jorge Rafael Videla
Ministry of Culture and Education (1981)
23	Carlos Burundarena	Independent	29 March 1981 – 12 December 1981	Roberto Viola
Ministry of Education (1981–1983)
24	Cayetano Licciardo	Independent	22 December 1981 – 10 December 1983	Roberto Viola
Ministry of Education and Justice (1983–1989)
25	Carlos Alconada Aramburú	Radical Civic Union	10 December 1983 – 21 June 1986	Raúl Alfonsín
26	Julio Rajneri	Independent	21 June 1986 – 10 September 1987	Raúl Alfonsín
27	Jorge Federico Sabato	Radical Civic Union	10 September 1987 – 26 May 1989	Raúl Alfonsín
28	José Gabriel Dumón	Radical Civic Union	26 May 1989 – 8 July 1989	Raúl Alfonsín
Ministry of Education (1989–2001)
29	Antonio Salonia	Independent	8 July 1989 – 4 December 1992	Carlos Menem
30	Jorge Alberto Rodríguez	Justicialist Party	4 December 1992 – 28 March 1996	Carlos Menem
31	Susana Decibe	Justicialist Party	28 March 1996 – 7 May 1999	Carlos Menem
32	Manuel García Solá	MID	7 May 1999 – 10 December 1999	Carlos Menem
33	Juan José Llach	Radical Civic Union	10 December 1999 – 25 September 2000	Fernando de la Rúa
34	Hugo Juri	Radical Civic Union	25 September 2000 – 20 March 2001	Fernando de la Rúa
35	Andrés Delich	Radical Civic Union	20 March 2001 – 21 December 2001	Fernando de la Rúa
Ministry of Education, Science and Technology (2002–2003)
36	Graciela Giannettasio	Justicialist Party	3 January 2002 – 25 May 2003	Eduardo Duhalde
37	Daniel Filmus	Justicialist Party	25 May 2003 – 10 December 2007	Néstor Kirchner
Ministry of Education (2007–2015)
38	Juan Carlos Tedesco	Independent	10 December 2007 – 20 July 2009	Cristina Fernández de Kirchner
39	Alberto Sileoni	Justicialist Party	20 July 2009 – 10 December 2015	Cristina Fernández de Kirchner
Ministry of Education and Sports (2015–2017)
40	Esteban Bullrich	Republican Proposal	10 December 2015 – 17 July 2017	Mauricio Macri
Ministry of Education (2017–2018)
41	Alejandro Finocchiaro	Republican Proposal	17 July 2017 – 5 September 2018	Mauricio Macri
Ministry of Education, Culture, Science and Technology (2018–2019)
41	Alejandro Finocchiaro	Republican Proposal	5 September 2018 – 10 December 2019	Mauricio Macri
Ministry of Education (2019–2023)
42	Nicolás Trotta	Independent	10 December 2019 – 20 September 2021	Alberto Fernández
43	Jaime Perczyk	Independent	20 September 2021 – 10 December 2023	Alberto Fernández
Secretary of Education (2023–)
44	Carlos Torrendell	Independent	10 December 2023 – present	Javier Milei
