= Alberto Sileoni =

Argentine academic (born 1952)

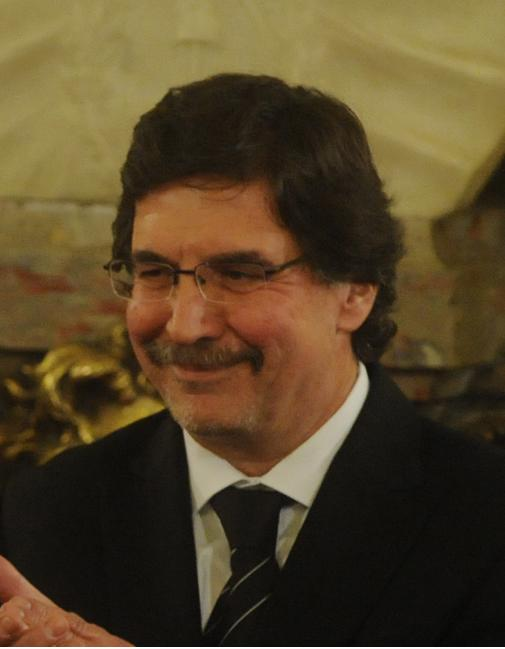

Minister of Education of Argentina
- In office July 20, 2009 – December 10, 2015
- President: Cristina Fernández de Kirchner
- Preceded by: Juan Carlos Tedesco
- Succeeded by: Esteban Bullrich

Minister of Education of the City of Buenos Aires
- In office March 2006 – February 2007
- Chief of Govt: Jorge Telerman

Personal details
- Born: 1952 (age 73–74) Buenos Aires, Argentina
- Party: Front for Victory
- Education: University of Buenos Aires; UNSAM

Alberto Estanislao Sileoni (born 1952) is an Argentine academic and policy maker who served as a former Minister of Education.

Alberto Sileoni enrolled in the University of Buenos Aires and earned a degree in history, in 1975. He later taught the discipline at his alma mater, and in 1993, was named Director of Adult Education Services for the City of Buenos Aires. He was shortly afterwards appointed the city's Undersecretary of Education, remaining in the post until the election of Mayor Fernando de la Rúa, in 1996.

Sileoni was transferred to the National Education Ministry, where he directed the Education and Work Project. The election of Mayor de la Rúa as president in late 1999 resulted in the project's replacement and Sileoni's appointment as Director of Secondary Education and Undersecretary for Buenos Aires Province Governor Carlos Ruckauf.

The election of a center-left Peronist, Néstor Kirchner, resulted in Sileoni's appointment as Vice Minister of Education in June 2003, a post he held until Minister Daniel Filmus transferred him to the City of Buenos Aires, in March 2006. He served as Education Minister for Mayor Jorge Telerman until Filmus declared his candidacy for Mayor, in early 2007; considering his friendship with Filmus a potential conflict of interest (when Mayor Telerman sought reelection), Sileoni resigned in February of that year.

The election of Kirchner's wife, Senator Cristina Fernández de Kirchner as president in late 2007 resulted in Sileoni's appointment as second-in-command for Education Minister Juan Carlos Tedesco, a UNESCO official. A disappointing showing in the June 2009 mid-term elections en 2009 and a subsequent cabinet-shake-up, however, led to Sileoni's appointment as Education Minister in replacement of Tedesco, who was made Director of the Ministry's Planning and Evaluation Unit.

== References and external links ==
- Argentine Ministry of Education (in Spanish)
