= Ministries of the Argentine Republic =

The ministries of Argentina, which form the cabinet, currently consist of eight ministries under a ministerial chief of staff. The ministers are appointed by and serve at the pleasure of the president. The current organization derives from the constitutional revision of 1994.

== History ==
Prior to independence, the administration of the Viceroyalty of the Río de la Plata was organized under the Royal Ordinance of Administrators (Spanish: Real Ordenanza de Intendentes) issued on 28 January 1782, under which there were eight intendencias, (Note: The intendencias were Buenos Aires, San Miguel de Tucumán, Cuyo, Paraguay, Santa Cruz de la Sierra, Potosí, La Paz, and Chuquisaca.) each with a governor reporting to the viceroy. The governor had the police, finance, and the military under his direct control, and his lieutenant administered the courts. At first the revolutionaries retained the same system, only gradually dispersing the executive authority over a larger body of men. The first true cabinet posts in Argentina emerged in the early to mid-19th century first under the United Provinces of the Río de la Plata and later under the Argentine Confederation and the State of Buenos Aires. For example, the Department of Governance and War (Departamento de Gobierno y Guerra) was created on 28 May 1810 by the First Junta with Mariano Moreno as secretary, and although the First Junta sent out diplomates as early as 1810, it was not until 27 February 1813 that the Department of Foreign Business (Departamento de Negocios Extranjeros) was created under the supervision of the Secretary of State.

Argentine Confederation (1831–1852)

- Ministry of War and the Navy
- Ministry of Finance
- Ministry of Interior
- Ministry of Foreign Affairs
- Ministry of Justice, Religion, and Public Education

State of Buenos Aires (1852–1861)

- Ministry of Governance
- Ministry of War
- Ministry of Finance
- Ministry of Foreign Affairs
- Prosecutor's Office

Argentina (before 2023)

Logo	Ministry	Date formed	Fate	Now part of
	Ministry of Foreign Affairs, International Trade and Worship		No changes	
	Ministry of Defense		No changes	
	Ministry of Justice		No changes	
	Ministry of Economy		No changes	
	Ministry of Security		No changes	
	Ministry of Health		No changes	
	Ministry of the Interior		No changes	
	Ministry of Culture	1973	Transformed into a secretariat	Ministry of Human Capital
	Ministry of Labour, Employment and Social Security	1943	Transformed into a secretariat	Ministry of Human Capital
	Ministry of Education	1949	Transformed into a secretariat	Ministry of Human Capital
	Ministry of Territorial Development and Habitat	2019	Transformed into a secretariat	Ministry of Economy
	Ministry of Transport	1949	Transformed into a secretariat	Ministry of Economy
	Ministry of Public Works	1898	Transformed into a secretariat	Ministry of Economy
	Ministry of Tourism and Sports	2001	Transformed into a secretariat	Secretariat of Tourism, Environment and Sports
	Ministry of Women, Genders and Diversity	2019	Transformed into a provisional undersecretary until dissolving in June 2024	
	Ministry of the Environment and Sustainable Development	2015	Fully dissolved	
	Ministry of Science, Technology and Innovation	2007	Fully dissolved	
	Ministry of Social Development	1955	Fully dissolved	

== Current ministries ==
As of October 2024

Portfolio	Logo	Incumbent				
Portfolio	Logo	Portrait	Name	Since	Party	Coalition
Chief of the Cabinet of Ministers			Manuel Adorni	5 November 2025	Freedom Advances	
Ministry of Foreign Affairs, International Trade and Worship			Pablo Quirno	28 October 2025	Freedom Advances	
Ministry of Defense			Carlos Presti	12 December 2025	Independent	
Ministry of the Interior			Diego Santilli	11 November 2025	Republican Proposal	Freedom Advances
Ministry of Economy			Luis Caputo	10 December 2023	Freedom Advances	
Ministry of Justice			Juan Bautista Mahiques	5 March 2026	Independent	
Ministry of National Security			Alejandra Monteoliva	2 December 2025	Freedom Advances	
Ministry of Health			Mario Lugones	26 September 2024	Independent	
Ministry of Human Capital			Sandra Pettovello	10 December 2023	Union of the Democratic Centre	Freedom Advances
Ministry of Deregulation and State Transformation			Federico Sturzenegger	5 July 2024	Freedom Advances	

== Presidential secretariats with ministerial rank ==
The 1983 Law on Ministries passed by then-president Raúl Alfonsín set the precedent for secretariats of state with ministerial rank. These secretaries respond directly to the presidency. As of the latest version of the Law on Ministries, these are the existing secretariats of the presidency counting with ministerial rank in the Argentine government.

Portfolio	Incumbent				
Portfolio	Portrait	Name	Since	Party	Coalition
General Secretariat		Karina Milei	10 December 2023	Freedom Advances	
Legal and Technical Secretariat		Javier Herrera Bravo	10 December 2023	Republican Proposal	Together for Change
Secretariat of Communication and Press		Javier Lanari	11 December 2025	Freedom Advances	
Culture Secretariat		Leonardo Cifelli	27 December 2023	Freedom Advances	
Secretariat of Intelligence of the State		Cristian Auguadra	2 December 2025	Independent	
