= Kelly Olmos =

Argentine politician (born 1952)

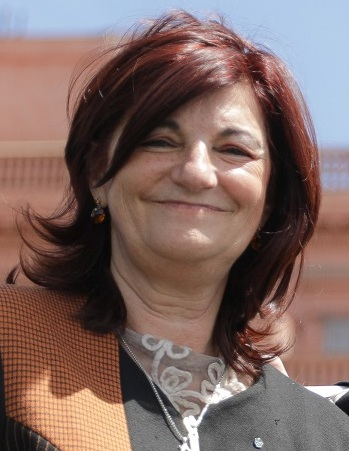

Minister of Labour
- In office 13 October 2022 – 10 December 2023
- President: Alberto Fernández
- Preceded by: Claudio Moroni
- Succeeded by: Sandra Pettovello (as Minister of Human Capital)

Secretary of Municipal Affairs
- In office 1 March 2007 – 10 December 2009
- President: Néstor Kirchner; Cristina Fernández de Kirchner
- Preceded by: Luis Alberto Ilarregui
- Succeeded by: Ignacio Lamothe

Legislator of the City of Buenos Aires
- In office 10 December 1997 – 10 December 2000

City Councillor of Buenos Aires
- In office 10 December 1993 – 10 December 1997

Personal details
- Born: 12 December 1952 (age 73) Buenos Aires, Argentina
- Party: Justicialist Party
- Other political affiliations: Front for Loyalty (2003); Front for Victory (2003–2017); Unidad Ciudadana (2017–2019); Frente de Todos (2019–present)
- Education: University of Buenos Aires

Raquel Cecilia Kismer de Olmos (Spanish pronunciation: [raˈkel seˈsilja ˈkismeɾ ðe ˈolmos]; born 12 December 1952), better known as Kelly Olmos, is an Argentine economist and politician who served as the country's Minister of Labour, Employment and Social Security from 2022 to 2023, in the cabinet of President Alberto Fernández.

A member of the Justicialist Party (PJ), she has spent most of her political career in Buenos Aires, where she has served as a member of the Deliberative Council (1993–1997), and later, after the adoption of the city's new constitution in 1996, as a member of the City Legislature (1997–2000). She also served in a number of executive positions within the city government under Mayor Jorge Domínguez.

From 2007 to 2011, she was Secretary of Municipal Affairs (a post within the Ministry of the Interior) during the presidencies of Néstor Kirchner and Cristina Fernández de Kirchner. She was director of the Banco Argentino de Desarrollo BICE from 2020 to 2022 and later served as vice president of the bank from January to October 2022.

== Biography ==
Raquel Kismer was born on 12 December 1952 in the Villa Urquiza neighbourhood of Buenos Aires, in her own words, a "working-class barrio [that led to her] becoming a peronist". She studied economics at the University of Buenos Aires Faculty of Economic Sciences, eventually graduating with a licenciatura degree. In addition, she has a magister's degree on urban economics from Universidad Torcuato di Tella.

Olmos is the daughter of Holocaust survivors and speaks Yiddish. She is married to Orlando Olmos, with whom she has three children. She describes herself as a feminist.

== Political career ==
Olmos' political career began under the wing of Carlos Corach, former interior minister to Carlos Menem. Her first elected post was to the Deliberative Council of Buenos Aires in 1993, before the adoption of the new city constitution which reformed the council into the City Legislature. She also served as a member of the City Legislature from 1997 to 2000, as part of the Justicialist Party bloc backing President Menem. She also served as director of the Corporación Buenos Aires Sur and as Secretary of Social Promotion, Production and Services and as Secretary of Industry and Commerce of Buenos Aires under Mayor Jorge Domínguez.

In March 2007, during the presidency of Néstor Kirchner, she was appointed as Secretary of Municipal Affairs (within the scope of the Ministry of the Interior), reporting to Minister Aníbal Fernández. She remained in the position following the election of Cristina Fernández de Kirchner as president, then reporting to Minister Florencio Randazzo, until 2009. In 2020, she was appointed to the directorate of the Banco Argentino de Desarrollo BICE, a state-owned development bank. She would later become vice-president of the bank in 2022.

In addition, Olmos has served as a member of the national council of the Justicialist Party. She is also a member of the Superior Council of the National University of Tres de Febrero (UNTREF) and director of its Instituto de Administración, Gobierno y Economía.

On 10 October 2022, Claudio Moroni resigned from his position as Minister of Labour, Employment and Social Security. President Alberto Fernández designated Olmos to the post, and she assumed office on 13 October 2022. It was one of three cabinet appointments made that day, alongside Ayelén Mazzina (to the Ministry of Women) and Victoria Tolosa Paz (to the Ministry of Social Development).

Political offices
Preceded by Claudio Moroni	Minister of Labour; 2022–2023	Succeeded by Sandra Pettovello as Minister of Human Capital
