= Jorge Triaca Jr. =

Argentine economist (born 1974)

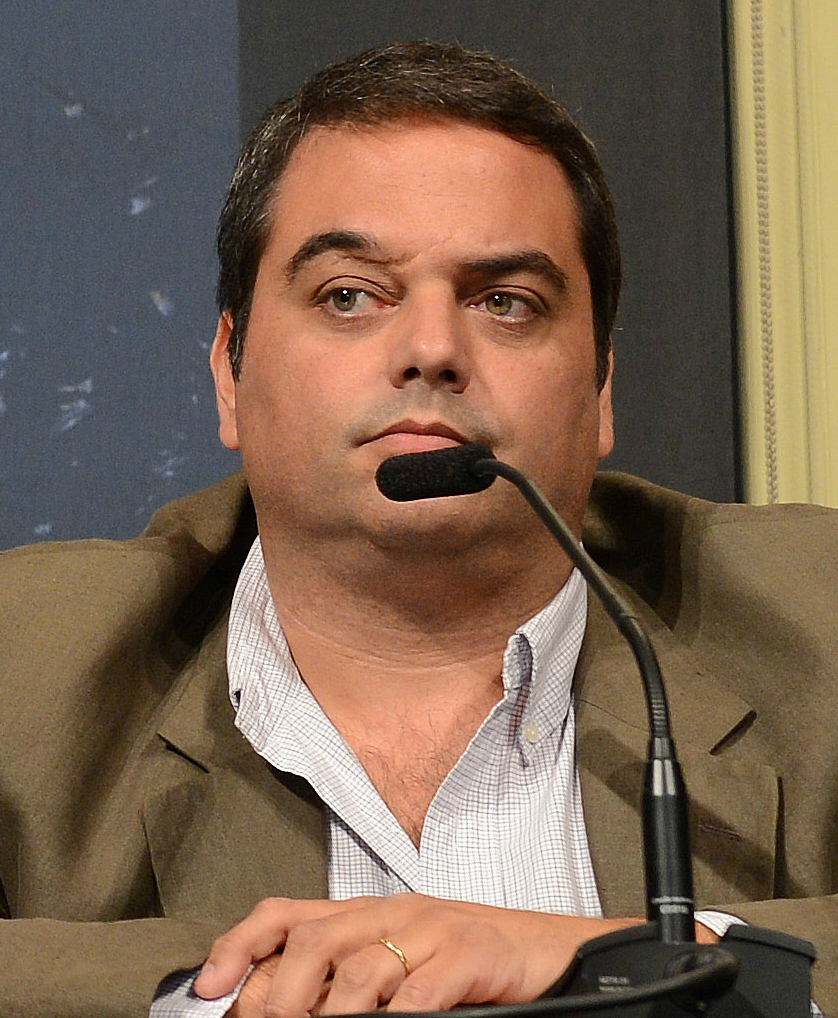

Minister of Labour, Employment and Social Security of Argentina
- In office 10 December 2015 – 3 December 2018
- President: Mauricio Macri
- Preceded by: Carlos Tomada
- Succeeded by: Dante Sica

National Deputy
- In office 10 December 2009 – 10 December 2015
- Constituency: Buenos Aires

Personal details
- Born: 30 March 1974 (age 52) Buenos Aires, Argentina
- Party: Republican Proposal
- Other political affiliations: Cambiemos (2015–present)
- Spouse: María Cecilia Loccisano
- Children: 2
- Parent: Jorge Alberto Triaca Sr. (father)
- Education: University of San Andrés
- Website: jorgetriaca.com

Jorge Alberto Triaca Jr. (born 30 March 1974) is an Argentine economist. Appointed by Mauricio Macri, he was the Minister of Labour, Employment and Social Security of Argentina until 3 December 2018.

== Biography ==
Jorge Triaca Jr. was born in Buenos Aires on 30 March 1974. He is the son of union and political leader Jorge Alberto Triaca (es) (1941–2008). He graduated from the University of Saint Andrés with a degree in economic sciences in 1996, and subsequently obtained a master's degree in Public Policy from University Torcuato di Tella, with his thesis on the process of market regulation.

== Politics ==
Triaca began his career as a consultant working on economic and labor projects such as BID ARG 826/OC-AR "Reform of the Public administration" (1996–1998), answering to the Ministry of Economy and Works and Public Services, and Project PNUD 94/001 "Reform of the Productive Sector" (1998) for the National Ministry of Work and Social Security. He was involved with development programs for the United Nations and the Inter-American Bank of Development, with themes of work, production and disability.

He is an activist of integration and equal opportunity employment. From 1998 through 2000, he coordinated the UNDP project ARG 98/033 " Occupational Program Support for People with Disabilities" created by the Department of Employment and Training of the National Ministry of Labour and Social Security.

Between 2002 and 2003 Triaca joined the Chief of the Cabinet of Ministers of the Nation in the Office of the Undersecretary of Coordination and Budgetary Assessments in the Credit Coordination with International Organizations.

Triaca directed the Odysseus Foundation's Area Youth Project between 2003 and 2004. In addition, he was from 2005 to 2009 CEO of the Thinking Foundation, dedicated to the analysis and formulation of public policies to develop long-term national plans.

Trica has been within the political sphere of Mauricio Macri since 2003. In 2009 he was elected national deputy for the City of Buenos Aires by the PRO, retaining his seat in 2013 elections. He has worked in the national assembly of the Party, contributing to the candidacy of Miguel del Sel in the province of Santa Fe. Because of his familial ties, he has also served as a channel of regular dialogue between the PRO and employers and trade unionists.

In his capacity as a national deputy, Triaca has authored numerous bills, primarily related to the economy and security.

Mauricio Macri has designated Triaca as Minister of Work, within the cabinet of his government that began on 10 December 2015.

In January 2018 an audio was leaked where Triaca dismisses and insults an employee of his. The woman (who worked unregistered since 2012) was fired without notice, without receiving compensation, unjustifiably and insults through WhatsApp. In addition, she worked as a Delegate of the Intervention in the SOMU union, placed there by Triaca. The minister admitted the facts in his Twitter account.
