= Sandra Pettovello =

Argentine politician (born 1968)

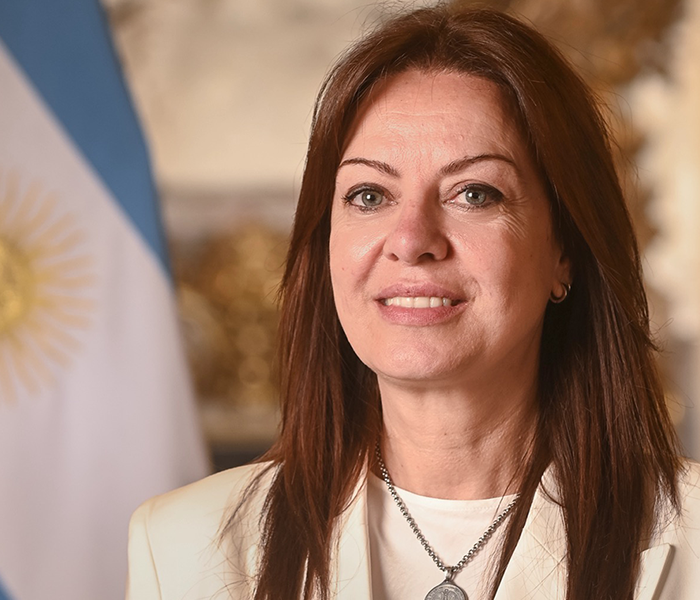
- Official portrait, 2024

Minister of Human Capital
- Incumbent
- Assumed office 10 December 2023
- President: Javier Milei
- Preceded by: Kelly Olmos (MTEySS); Jaime Perczyk (ME); Tristán Bauer (Culture); Victoria Tolosa Paz (MDS)

Personal details
- Born: Sandra Viviana Pettovello; 6 April 1968 (age 58) Buenos Aires, Argentina
- Party: LLA (2024–present) (Note: Member of the coalition of the same name since 2021)
- Other political affiliations: UCD (1987–2024)
- Spouse: Pablo Rago (m. 1993; div. 1994)
- Children: 1
- Education: University of Belgrano; Austral University; International University of Catalonia
- Occupation: Journalist • Politician

Sandra Viviana Pettovello (Spanish pronunciation: [ˈsandɾa βiˈβjana petoˈβelo]; born 6 April 1968) is an Argentine journalist, consultant, and politician who has served as the Minister of Human Capital since 10 December 2023 under the appointment by President Javier Milei.

Pettovello has previously served as a vice president of the Union of the Democratic Centre political party in Buenos Aires from 2021 to 2023.

== Early life and education ==
Sandra Viviana Pettovello was born on 6 April 1968.

Pettovello earned a licentiate in journalism from the University of Belgrano in 2003, and a licentiate in family sciences from Austral University in 2019. She has completed postgraduate work in family policies at the International University of Catalonia.

Pettovello has also reported taking additional courses in varied subjects, including cyberpsychology, neuropsychoeducation, public administration, and reiki.

== Career ==
After graduating from the University of Belgrano, Pettovello worked as a columnist at Radio El Mundo. She was also a producer of the television news program La Cornisa before she returned to university for her degree in family sciences.

From 21 August 2021 to 21 August 2023, Pettovello served as a vice president of the Union of the Democratic Centre of the city of Buenos Aires. (Note: Pettovello was the vicepresidente segundo ('second vice president') of the organization in Buenos Aires.)

On 10 December 2023, Pettovello was appointed by President Javier Milei to head the newly created Ministry of Human Capital, which combined the former ministries of culture, of education, of labor, and of social development. She was the first minister that Milei named while he was campaigning for the presidency. Pettovello has stated that she sees herself as a coordinator, as it is impossible for her to have expertise in all four areas.

In her first public appearance as human capital minister, Pettovello announced that any protesters who tried to block the streets during a then-upcoming protest would be cut off from social welfare. (Note: The protest in question was an annual event held in honor of 39 people who were killed during protests over two days in late 2001.)

=== Conflict with Soup Kitchens ===
On February 1, 2024, Sandra Pettovello took to the streets to personally confront a demonstration by the Union of Popular Economy Workers (UTEP), which accused her of cutting off the supply of food to government funded soup kitchens since she took office. The minister declared that she would personally receive anyone who is hungry. On February 5, 2024, a line of approximately 40 blocks of people willing to meet with the minister formed, but she refused to receive them. This phenomenon became known as "the hunger line." On the same day, February 5, Pettovello was criminally charged with "breach of public duties" and for suspending the delivery of basic food to dining halls.

== Controversies ==
The Argentine Episcopal Conference issued a strong statement to the minister on February, stating that "hundreds of thousands of families find it increasingly difficult to eat well."

Amid the food crisis, the minister agreed to allocate 177 million pesos to the Christian Alliance of Evangelical Churches of Argentina (ACEIRA) for the purchase of food modules. ACEIRA supported Javier Milei's presidential campaign, and the daughter of the organization's pro-secretary, Nadia Márquez, is a national deputy for La Libertad Avanza.

Regarding her public image, journalists Jorge Lanata and Marina Calabró criticized Minister Pettovello for flaunting a Hermès Birkin handbag, priced between 18,000 and 28,000 euros, amidst protests for food emergencies and the President's austerity measures.

== Personal life ==
Her marriage to the actor Pablo Rago during the 1990s ended in divorce. They were married in 1993, and had separated by 1994.
