= Carlos Tomada =

Argentine politician

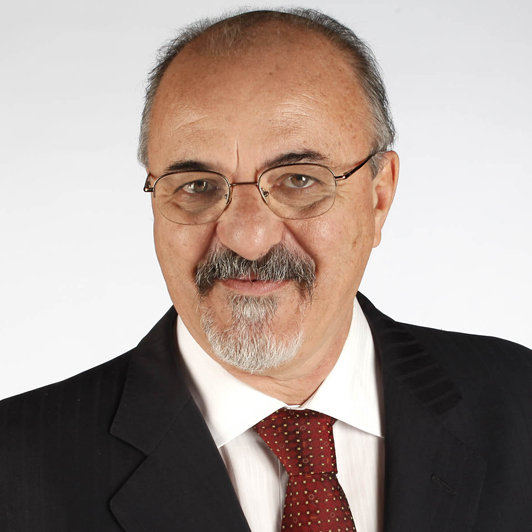

Ambassador of Argentina in Mexico
- In office October 2020 – December 2023
- President: Alberto Fernández
- Preceded by: Ezequiel Sabor
- Succeeded by: María Gabriela Quinteros

Minister of Labour, Employment, and Social Security
- In office 25 May 2003 – 10 December 2015
- President: Néstor Kirchner; Cristina Fernández de Kirchner
- Preceded by: Graciela Camaño
- Succeeded by: Jorge Triaca Jr.

Personal details
- Born: 4 May 1948 (age 78) Buenos Aires, Argentina
- Party: Justicialist Party
- Spouse: Clarisa Tomada
- Education: University of Buenos Aires

Carlos Alfonso Tomada (born 4 May 1948) is an Argentine Peronist politician who served as the country's Minister of Labour, Employment, and Social Security from 2003 to 2015, having first been appointed by former President Néstor Kirchner, and reappointed by President Cristina Fernández de Kirchner. From 2020 he served as Argentina's ambassador to Mexico as well as Belize beginning the following year until 2023.

== Early and personal life ==
Tomada was born in the Palermo neighborhood of Buenos Aires to a family with a history of involvement in politics: his mother, a teacher, was a Socialist and daughter of a Socialist member of the Argentine Chamber of Deputies, and his father was a Peronist lawyer. He played rugby for the Gimnasia y Esgrima de Buenos Aires club and at the Colegio Nacional de Buenos Aires. He enrolled at the University of Buenos Aires, was active in the Peronist Youth (the youth wing of the Justicialist Party), and earned a law degree in 1973. He and his wife, Clarisa, married in 1971 and had two sons.

== Career ==
As a lawyer, lecturer and trade unionist he has been involved in issues of employment and labor rights. He served as a consultant to the International Labour Organization (ILO), the United Nations Development Programme, and the Friedrich Ebert Foundation from 1986 onward, and from 1987 to 1989, served as National Director of Labor Relations. Tomada was named Professor of Labor Relations at his alma mater in 1988, served as Department Dean, and taught at the National University of La Matanza. Retaining his teaching post, he served as a labor law advisor to the CGT, the nation's largest trade union, from 1989 to 1992. He acted as a labor dispute mediator in subsequent years, and in 1997, was invited to the First World Summit of Labor Mediation.

=== Ministry of Labour ===
President Eduardo Duhalde appointed Tomada Secretary of Labour in 2002. He was a founding member of the Calafate Group, a think tank organized with Governor Néstor Kirchner in 1998, and on 25 May 25, 2003, he was sworn into the Cabinet in his current post as Minister of Labour, Employment, and Social Security by the newly elected President Kirchner.

Tomada headed the Front for Victory (FpV) party list in 2007 for the election of National Deputies representing the city of Buenos Aires. He was elected in October 2007; but forfeited his seat for reappointment as Minister of Labour by President Cristina Fernández de Kirchner. Serving both Kirchner administrations in this capacity, he became the longest-serving cabinet member since the advent of Kirchnerism in 2003. His tenure was highlighted by the August 2004 establishment of the National Council on Employment, Productivity, and Minimum Wages, which he presides and which periodically sets minimum wages and other labour guidelines. High inflation further underscored the importance of the council, which took part in numerous collective bargaining talks between management and organized labour.

Tomada also served as President of the ILO Administrative Council in 2005 and 2006, and remained active in the ILO afterwards. He announced his candidacy for Mayor of Buenos Aires in 2011 as a FpV candidate. Tomada was not nominated, but instead became the running mate to FpV nominee Daniel Filmus. Their ticket was defeated in a July runoff election by incumbent Mayor Mauricio Macri. Tomada retained his Labour portfolio.

=== Ambassador to Mexico ===
In 2020, Tomada was appointed ambassador of Argentina to Mexico by the government of Alberto Fernández. He is due to present his credentials before the Mexican government in October 2020.
