= International University of Catalonia =

Private university in Catalonia, Spain

Universitat Internacional de Catalunya
- Universitat Internacional de Catalunya
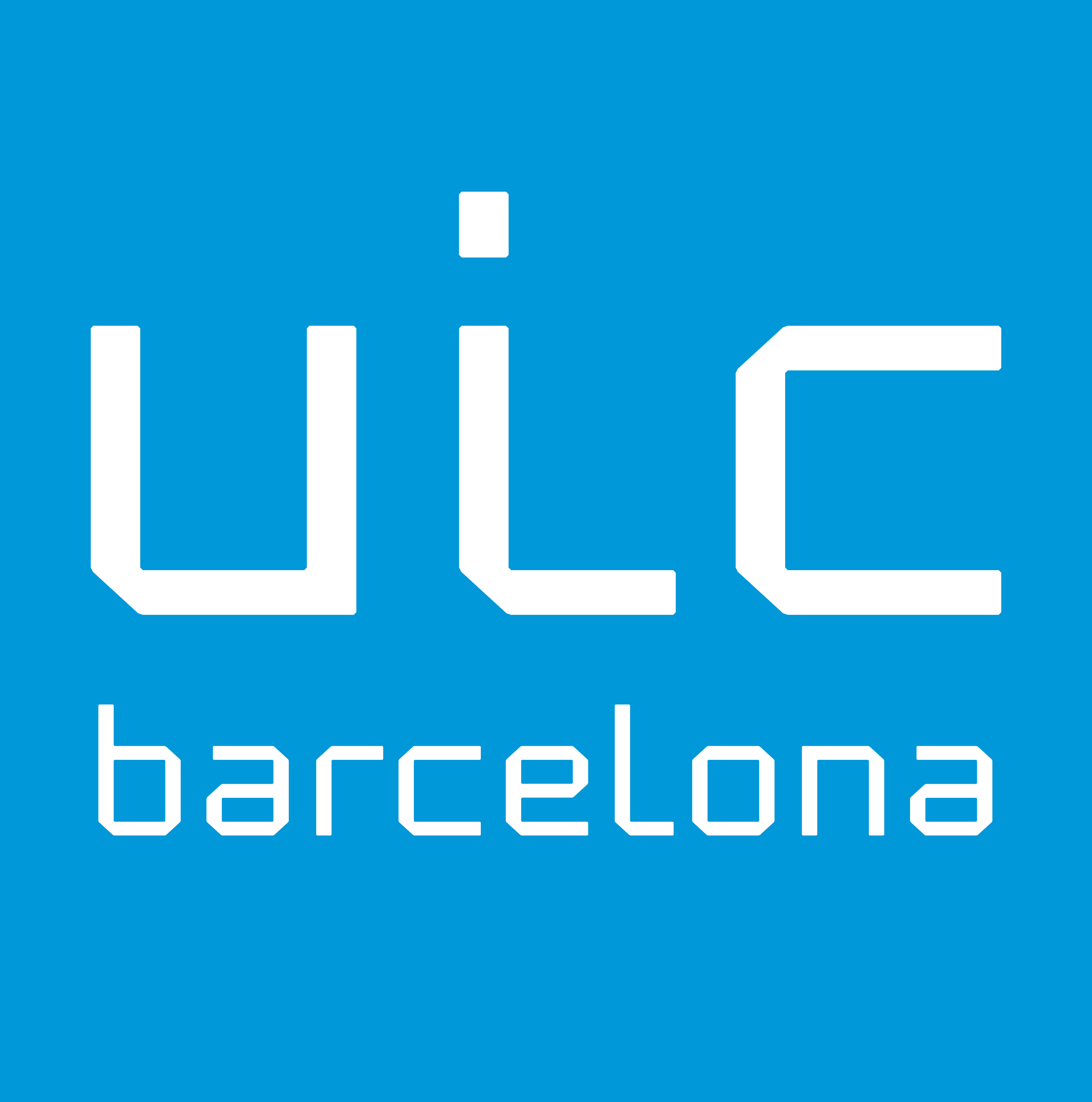
- Logo of UIC Barcelona
- Other name: International University of Catalonia
- Motto: Veritas liberabit vos
- Motto in English: The truth will set you free
- Type: Private university
- Established: 1 October 1997; 29 years ago
- Affiliations: European University Association, Xarxa Vives d'Universitats, Conference of Rectors of Spanish Universities
- Rector: Alfonso Méndiz
- Academic staff: 704
- Administrative staff: 498
- Students: 9,415
- Location: Barcelona and Sant Cugat del Vallès, Spain
- Campus: Campus Barcelona; Campus Sant Cugat
- Website: www.uic.es/en

The Universitat Internacional de Catalunya —commonly branded as UIC Barcelona and known in English as the International University of Catalonia— is a private university in Catalonia, Spain, with campuses in Barcelona and Sant Cugat del Vallès. It was recognised as a private university by the Parliament of Catalonia through Law 11/1997, of 1 October 1997.

The university has two main campuses, Campus Barcelona and Campus Sant Cugat, and offers programmes in fields including health sciences, dentistry, architecture, business, communication, law, education and the humanities. In the 2024–2025 academic year, it reported 9,415 enrolled students, 704 academic and research staff, and 498 administrative and service staff.

In that academic year, its official academic offer comprised 43 degrees: 16 bachelor's degrees, 23 university master's degrees and four doctoral programmes. The university also reported 1,979 international undergraduate and postgraduate students from 109 countries, as well as 497 mobility agreements with foreign universities and institutions.

UIC Barcelona appears in international and Spanish university rankings. In the QS World University Rankings 2027 it was placed in the 901–950 band worldwide, and in the QS World University Rankings by Subject 2026 its Dentistry area was ranked 36th worldwide and 2nd in Spain.

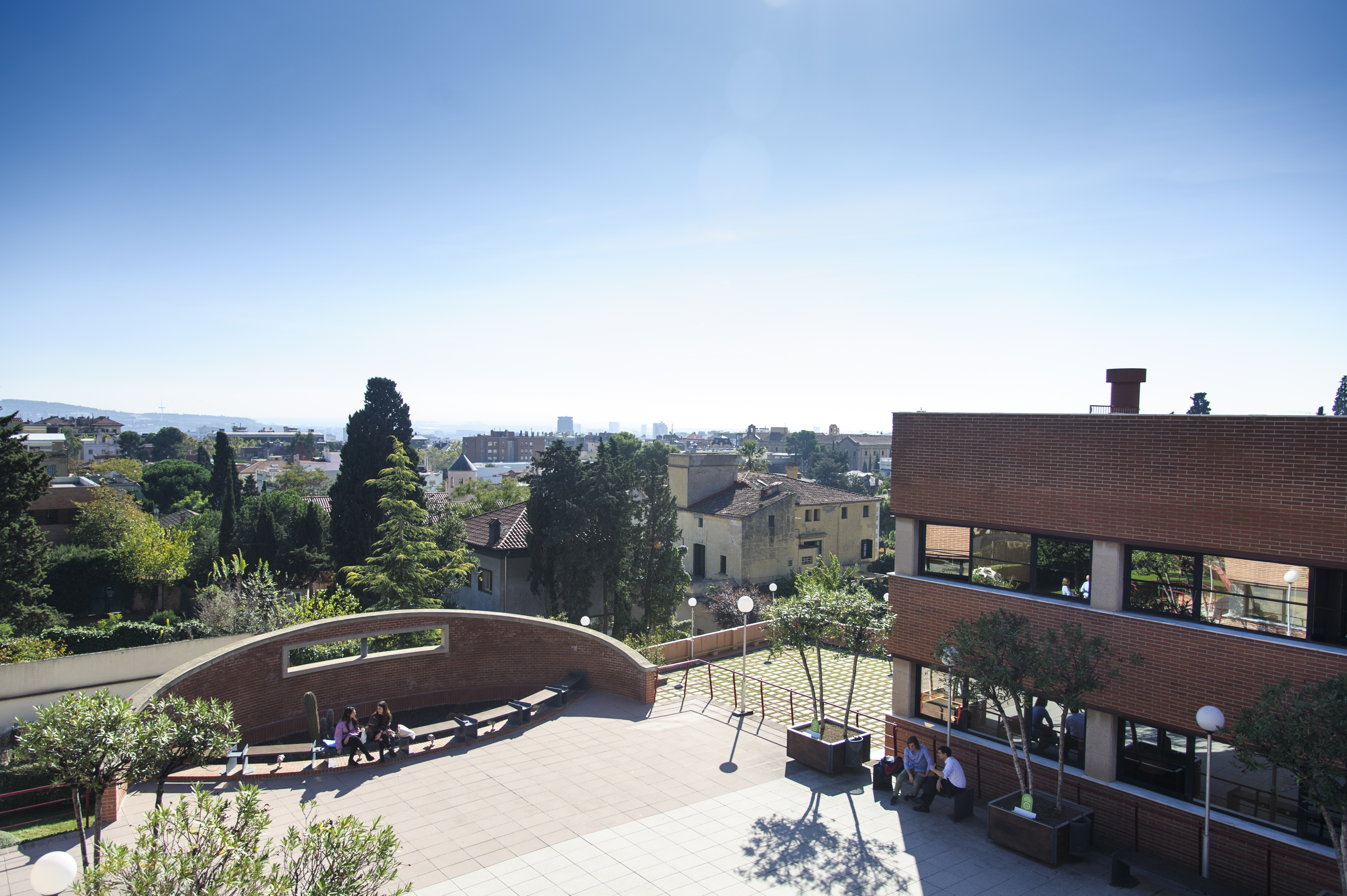
Campus Barcelona of UIC Barcelona

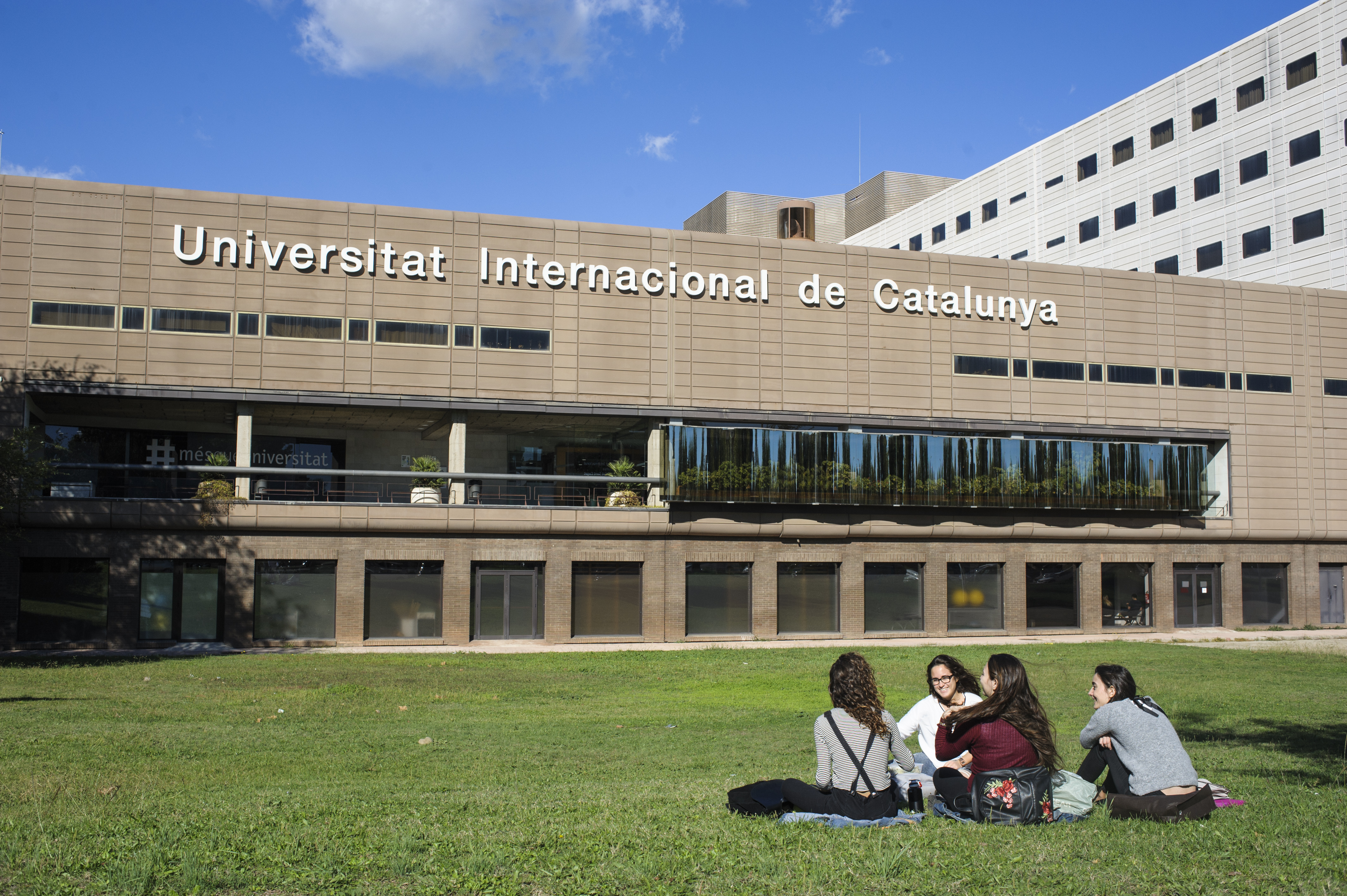
Campus Sant Cugat of UIC Barcelona

== History ==
The creation of the university was promoted by the Fundació Familiar Catalana, which began the process of establishing a new private university in Catalonia in the mid-1990s. The Parliament of Catalonia approved its recognition through Law 11/1997, of 1 October 1997, which authorised the new institution to begin academic activity once the relevant administrative requirements had been met.

The law initially provided for several teaching centres, including a Faculty of Legal and Political Sciences, a Faculty of Health Sciences, a Faculty of Humanities, a Faculty of Economic and Social Sciences and a Technical School of Architecture. According to the university's institutional chronology, Jordi Cervós Navarro was presented as the future rector in 1996 and became the university's first rector in 1997.

Jordi Cervós Navarro was succeeded by Josep Argemí i Renom in 2001, Pere Alavedra Ribot in 2010, Xavier Gil Mur in 2015 and Alfonso Méndiz Noguero in 2021.

== Institutional identity and governance ==
The Universitat Internacional de Catalunya has the legal personality of a private foundation. Its organisational and operating rules state that it has its own legal personality, full legal capacity and its own assets. The Board of Trustees is the institution's highest governing body and is responsible for appointments including the rector, vice-rectors, secretary general, general manager, deans and directors of schools and institutes.

The university defines its institutional philosophy in terms of Christian humanism and an integral conception of university education. Religious and spiritual services are offered by the university chaplaincy to members of the university community who freely wish to use them, and pastoral care is entrusted to priests of the Prelature of Opus Dei.

== Campuses and facilities ==
UIC Barcelona has two main campuses. Campus Barcelona, located in the Sarrià-Sant Gervasi district of Barcelona, hosts a significant part of teaching in areas such as business, communication, law, education, humanities and architecture. Campus Sant Cugat, located in Sant Cugat del Vallès, is mainly devoted to health sciences, including medicine, nursing, physiotherapy and dentistry.

According to institutional data for 2024–2025, Campus Barcelona had 30,628.56 m^{2} of built space and Campus Sant Cugat had 23,067 m^{2}. The university's teaching and professional facilities include university clinics, simulation laboratories and practice-based learning spaces. The university identifies three main clinics: Cuides UIC Barcelona, the University Dental Clinic and SUPPORT, the University Psychology and Psychiatry Clinic.

== Academic organisation ==
The university is organised into faculties, schools and institutes. According to its institutional list of centres, it includes faculties in economic and social sciences, communication, law, education, humanities, medicine and health sciences, dentistry and architecture, as well as university institutes and the Doctoral School.

In the 2024–2025 academic year, UIC Barcelona reported 43 official degrees: 16 bachelor's degrees, 23 university master's degrees and four doctoral programmes. Its bachelor's degree offer covered fields including business administration and management, architecture, bioengineering, biomedicine, communication, law, education, physiotherapy, humanities, nursing, medicine, dentistry and psychology.

=== Faculties, schools and academic heads ===
The university's plenary Governing Board includes the deans of the faculties, the director of the School of Architecture, department directors and the heads of university institutes.

Centre	Head	Main academic field
Faculty of Economic and Social Sciences	Dr Toni Moral Corral	Business, administration and management
Faculty of Communication Sciences	Dr Isabel Villanueva Benito	Communication, journalism, advertising and public relations
Faculty of Law	Dr Rafael Oliver Cuello	Law and legal studies
Faculty of Education Sciences	Dr Enric Vidal Rodà	Early childhood education, primary education and teacher training
Faculty of Humanities	Dr Laura Gandolfi	Humanities and cultural studies
Faculty of Medicine and Health Sciences	Dr Esther Calbo Sebastián	Medicine, nursing, physiotherapy, psychology, biomedicine and bioengineering
Faculty of Dentistry	Dr Lluís Giner Tarrida	Dentistry and oral sciences
School of Architecture	Dr Iñigo Ugalde Blázquez	Architecture, urbanism and architectural design

=== Institutes, doctoral school and related entities ===
In addition to its faculties and schools, the university has a Doctoral School and several university institutes or academic and professional centres linked to research, knowledge transfer and specialised training.

Entity	Head	Field
Doctoral School	Dr Núria Casals Farré	Doctoral training
Institute for Advanced Family Studies	Dr Marc Grau Grau	Family, work and society studies
Institut Carlemany d'Estudis Europeus	Dr Montserrat Nebrera González	European studies
University Institute for Patient Care	Dr Boi Ruiz García	Patient care, health and healthcare management
Institute for Research in Evaluation and Public Policy	Dr Toni Mora Corral	Evaluation and public policy
Bioengineering Institute of Technology	Dr Román Pérez Antoñanzas	Bioengineering, technology and health
Institute for Culture and Thought	Dr Andrea Rodríguez Prat	Culture, thought and humanities
Institute of Just and Resilient Carbon Neutral Places	Dr Lorenzo Chelleri	Urban sustainability and ecological transition

=== University clinics ===
UIC Barcelona has university clinics linked to teaching, care and professional practice. The university identifies three main clinics: Cuides UIC Barcelona, the University Dental Clinic and SUPPORT, the University Psychology and Psychiatry Clinic.

Clinic	Field
Cuides UIC Barcelona	Healthcare and care services
University Dental Clinic	Dentistry and clinical dental practice
SUPPORT. University Psychology and Psychiatry Clinic	Clinical psychology, psychiatry and mental health

== Research and knowledge transfer ==
The university conducts research through research groups, institutes, chairs and competitive and non-competitive projects. According to institutional data for the 2024–2025 academic year, it had 24 research groups, 167 active research projects and 14 corporate or institutional chairs. In that academic year, the university reported 320 articles in indexed journals, including 242 indexed in Web of Science and 157 in first-quartile journals.

In 2018, UIC Barcelona obtained the European Commission's "HR Excellence in Research" award, related to the European human resources strategy for researchers. The university also participates in European university cooperation initiatives, including the EduCare 5.0 alliance, which received the European Commission's Seal of Excellence under the European Universities call.

== Internationalisation and university community ==
In the 2024–2025 academic year, UIC Barcelona reported 1,979 international undergraduate and postgraduate students from 109 nationalities, and 90 international professors among its academic and research staff. The university also reported 497 mobility agreements with foreign universities and institutions.

According to the same institutional data, 65.89% of undergraduate and postgraduate students were women and 34.11% were men. Among academic and research staff, 51.42% were women and 48.58% were men. The university also reported a cumulative total of 30,753 alumni.

== Rankings and recognition ==
The university's position in international and Spanish rankings varies according to methodology, the field assessed and the number of institutions included. The university publishes its ranking results through its transparency portal.

Academic rankings
Spain
CYD Ranking	6
CYD Education	1
Forbes España	Top 20
Global
QS	901–950
THE	1001–1200
THE Impact	301–400
QS Europe	406–407
By subject
QS Dentistry	36
THE Education	401–500
THE Medical	601–800

In the QS World University Rankings 2027, UIC Barcelona was placed in the 901–950 band worldwide and tied 25th among Spanish universities included in the ranking. In the Times Higher Education World University Rankings 2026, it appeared in the 1001–1200 band worldwide and between 27th and 38th in Spain. In the THE Impact Rankings 2025, the university appeared in the 301–400 band worldwide.

By subject, the university's strongest ranking result was in Dentistry, where it ranked 36th worldwide and 2nd in Spain in the QS World University Rankings by Subject 2026. In the Times Higher Education World University Rankings by Subject 2026, the university appeared in the 401–500 band in Education Studies, 601–800 in Medical and Health and 601–800 in Social Sciences.

In Spain, the 2026 CYD Ranking placed UIC Barcelona 6th among 84 Spanish universities according to the number of high-performance indicators. In the same edition, the university ranked 1st in Spain in Education. In 2026, Forbes España included UIC Barcelona in its list of twenty leading universities in Spain.

== Rectors ==
Since its foundation, the Universitat Internacional de Catalunya has had five rectors. Jordi Cervós Navarro was a neuropathologist; Josep Argemí i Renom is a professor of paediatrics; Pere Alavedra Ribot is an industrial engineer; Xavier Gil Mur is a professor of materials engineering; and Alfonso Méndiz Noguero is a professor of audiovisual communication and advertising.

Rectors of the Universitat Internacional de Catalunya
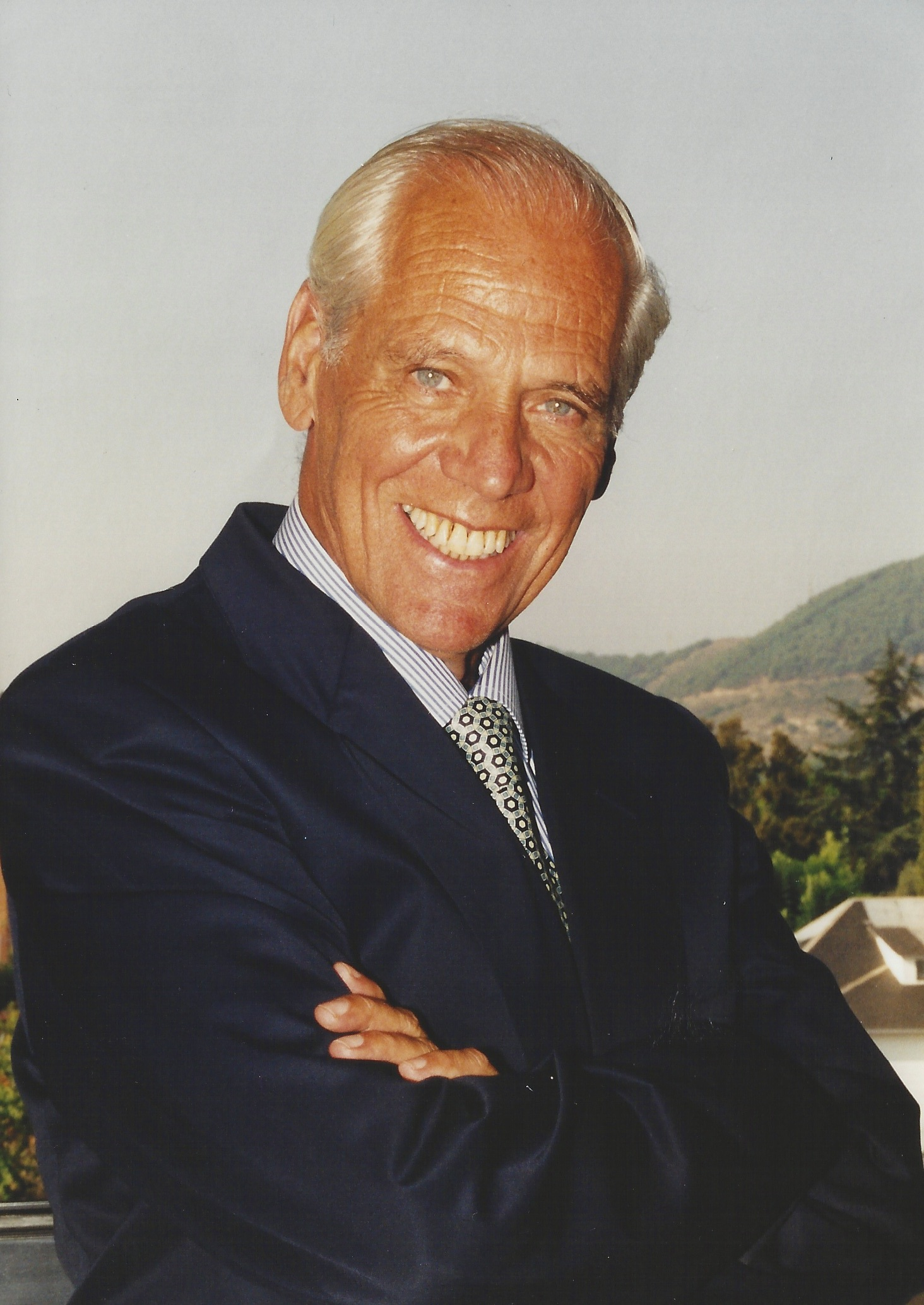

1st rector
Jordi Cervós Navarro
Neuropathologist
1997–2001

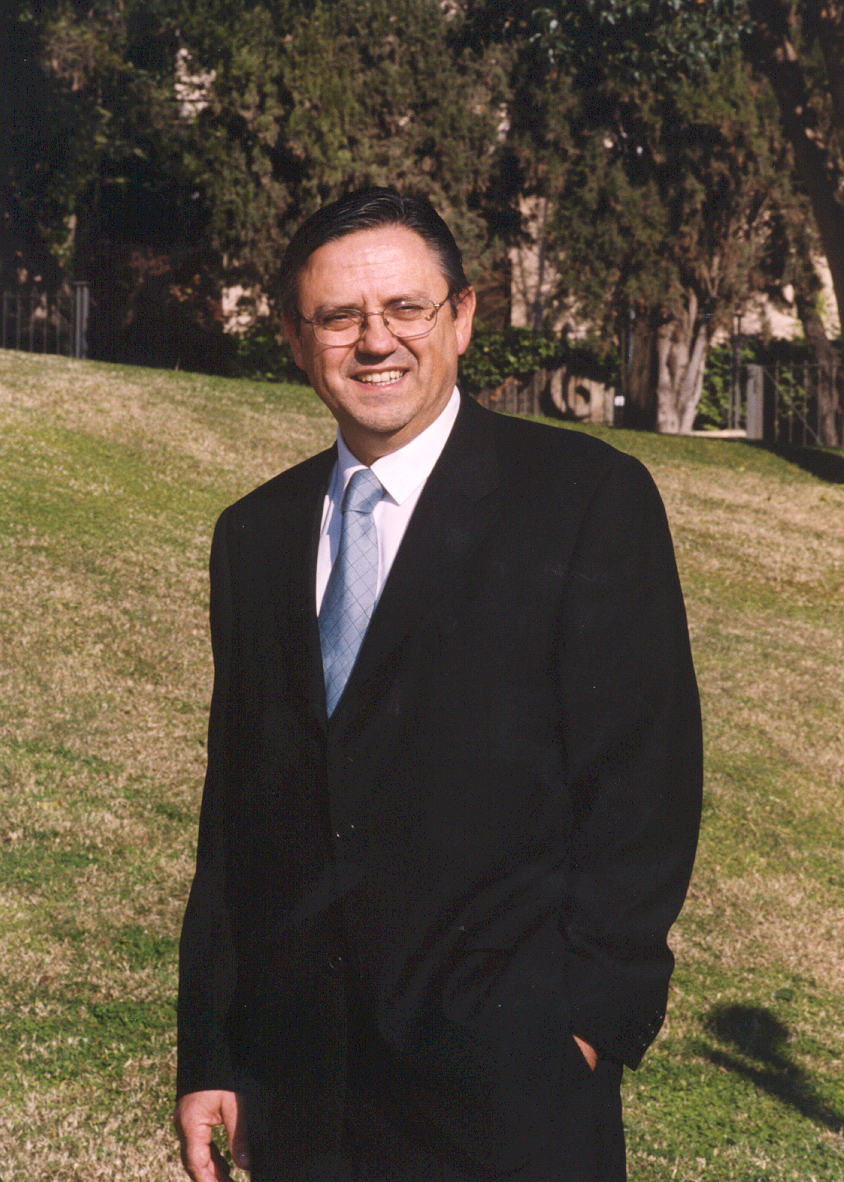

2nd rector
Josep Argemí i Renom
Professor of paediatrics
2001–2010

3rd rector
Pere Alavedra Ribot
Industrial engineer
2010–2015

4th rector
Xavier Gil Mur
Professor of materials engineering
2015–2021

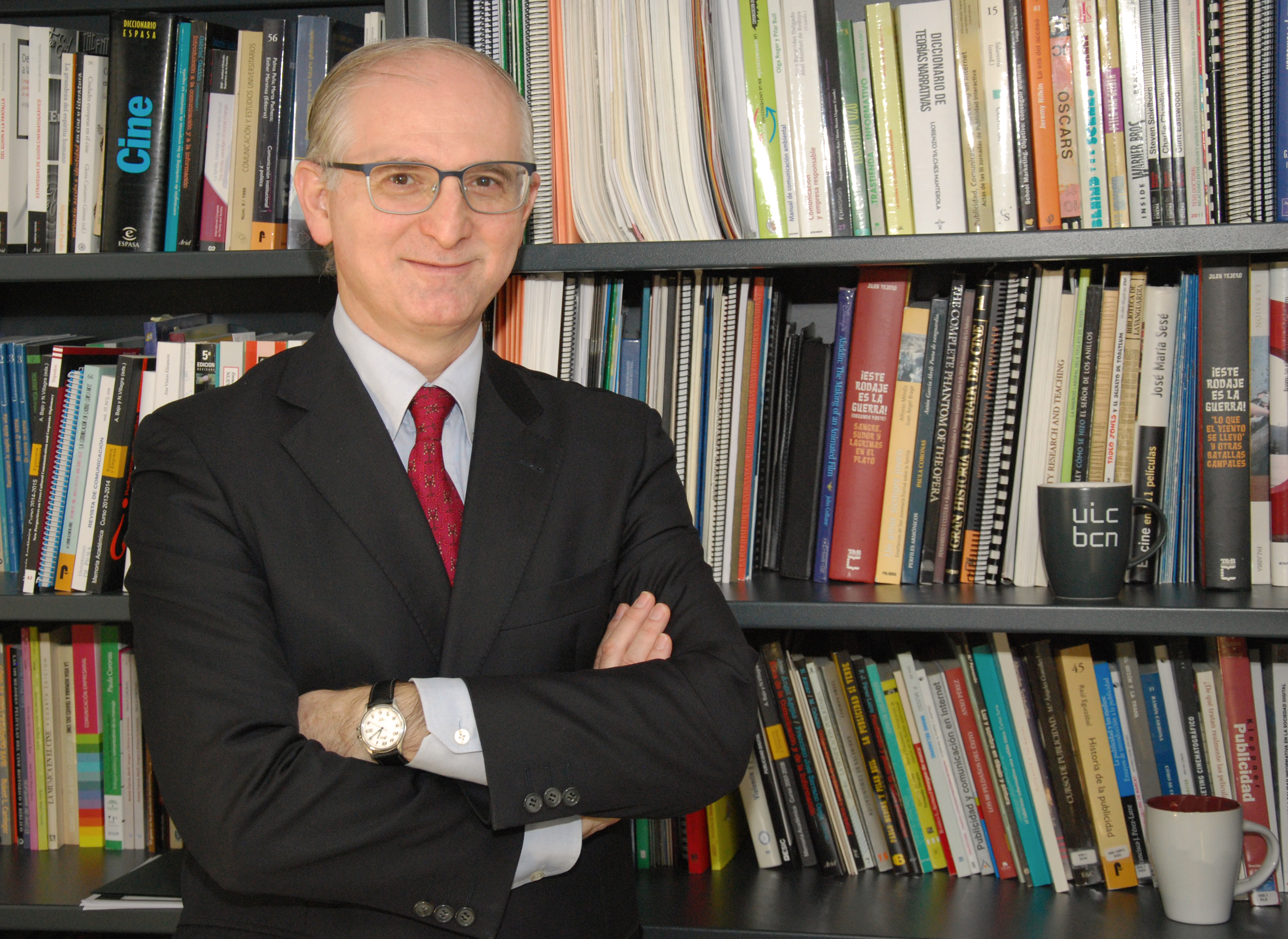

5th rector
Alfonso Méndiz Noguero
Professor of audiovisual communication and advertising
2021–present

== Alumni ==
According to institutional data for the 2024–2025 academic year, UIC Barcelona had 30,753 alumni, including 15,524 from bachelor's, licentiate or diploma programmes, 4,465 from university master's degrees, 2,473 from institutional master's degrees, 592 from doctoral programmes and 7,420 from postgraduate programmes.

The university has an Alumni community focused on alumni relations, employability and professional links with the institution. People who have studied at the university and have Wikipedia articles include singer Alfred García, historian and politician Santi Vila, dentist and politician Ignacio Garriga, historian Fernando Sánchez Costa and Argentine politician Sandra Pettovello.

Notable alumni include:
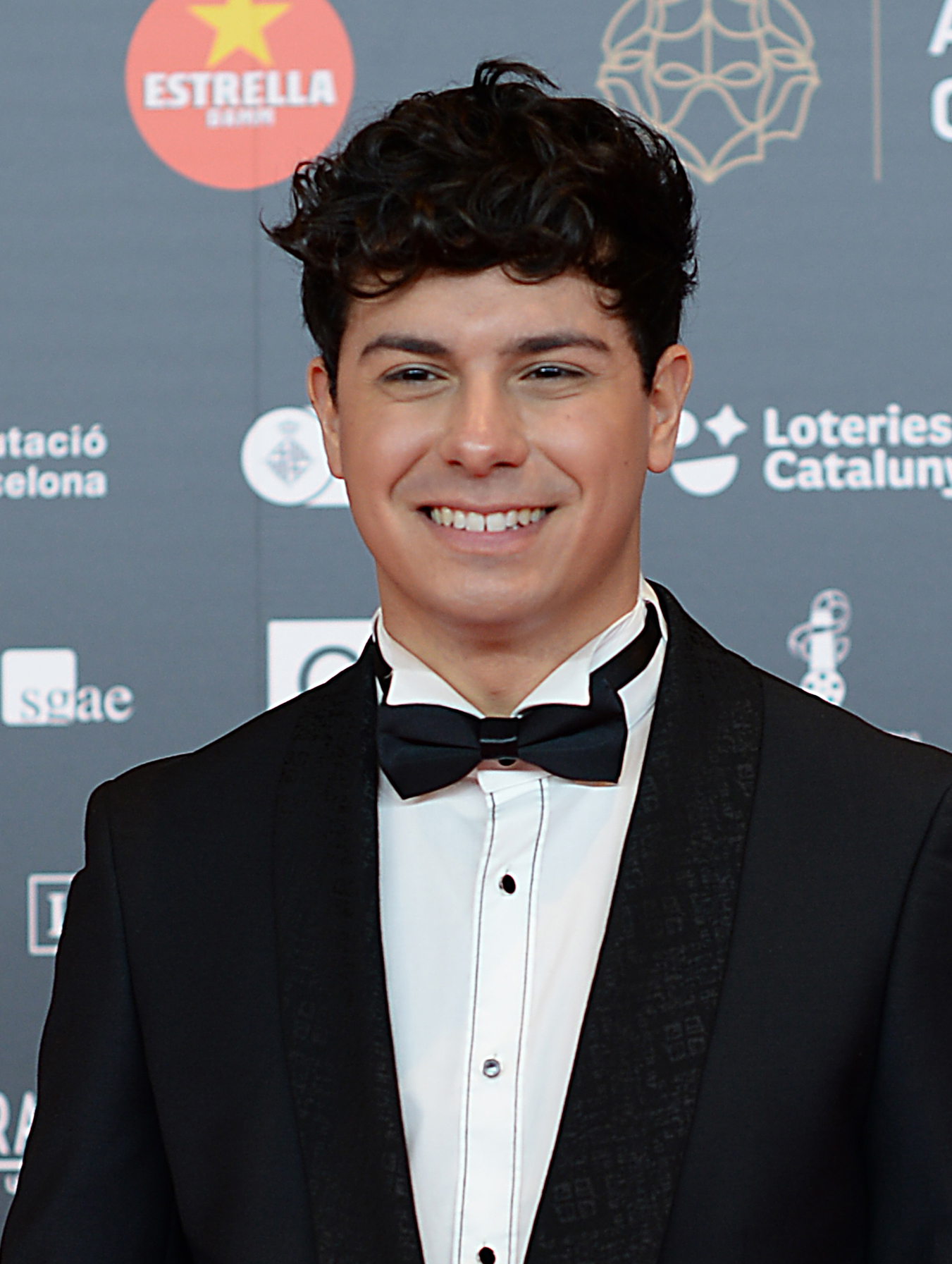

Alfred García Castillo
Singer and songwriter

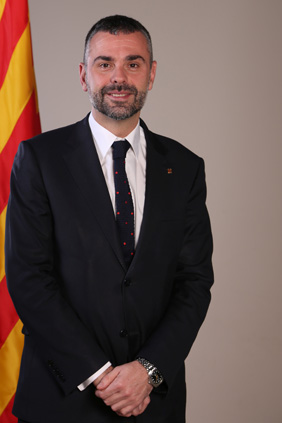

Santi Vila i Vicente
Historian and politician

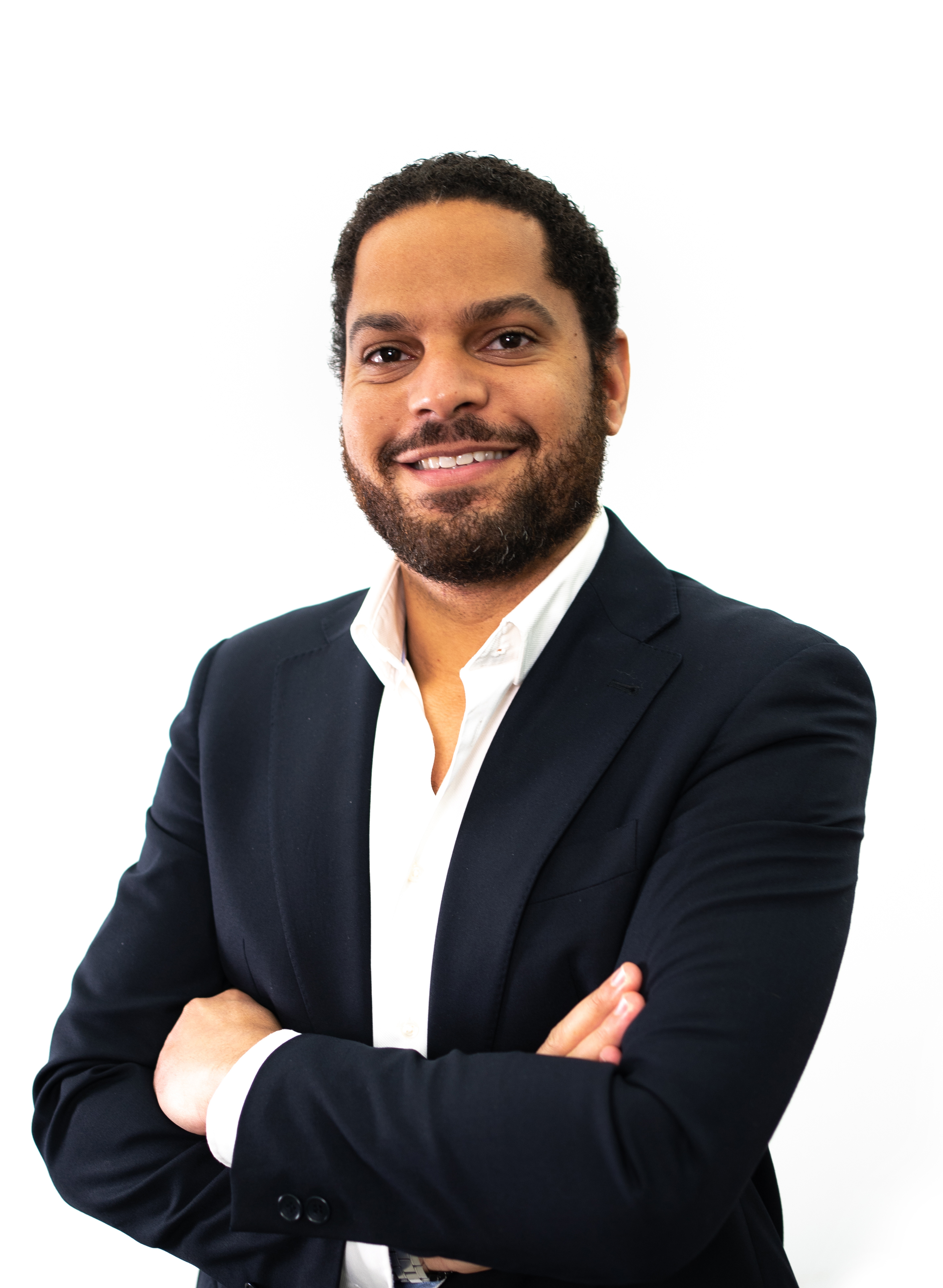

Ignacio Garriga Vaz de Concicao
Dentist and politician

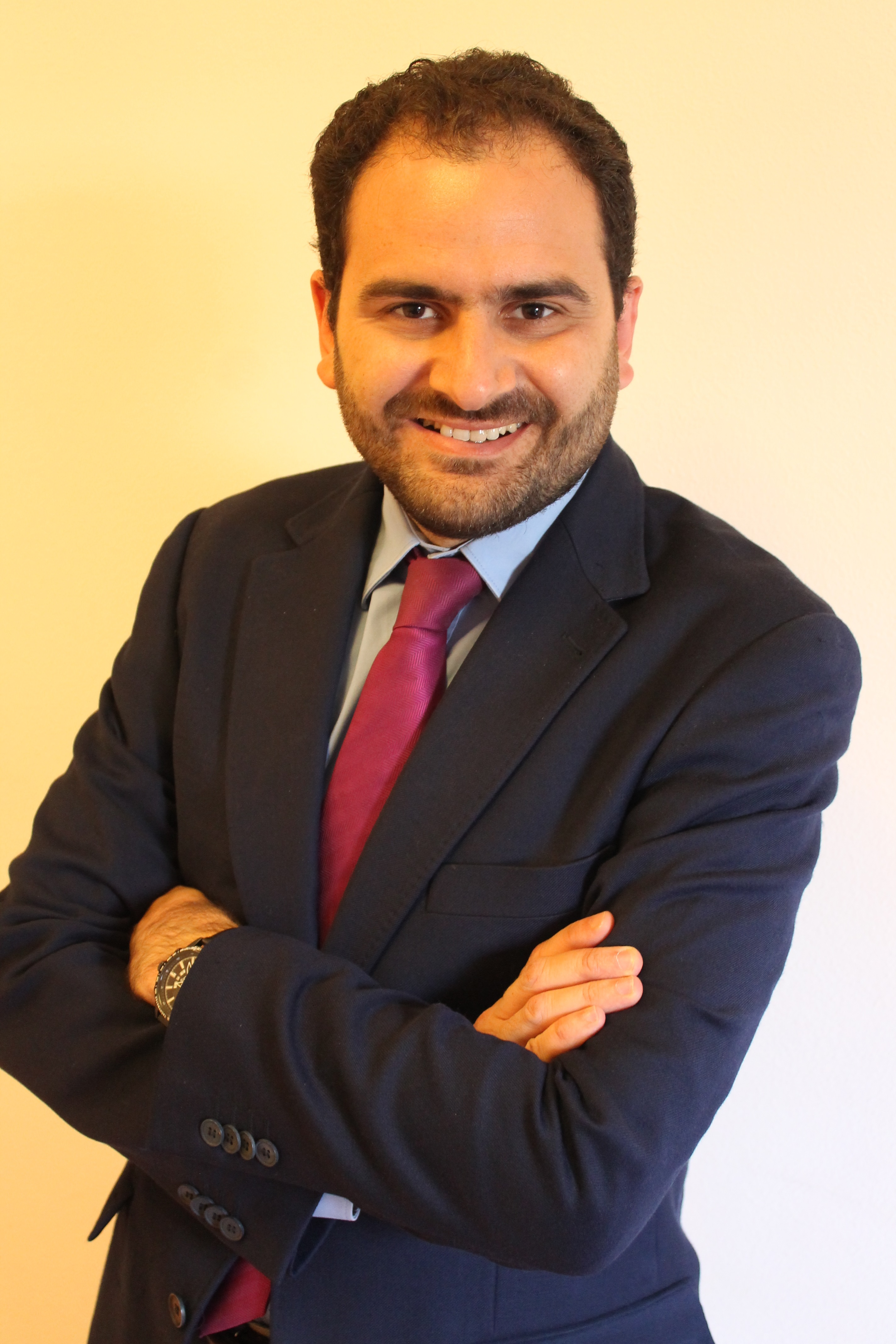

Fernando Sánchez Costa
Historian and academic

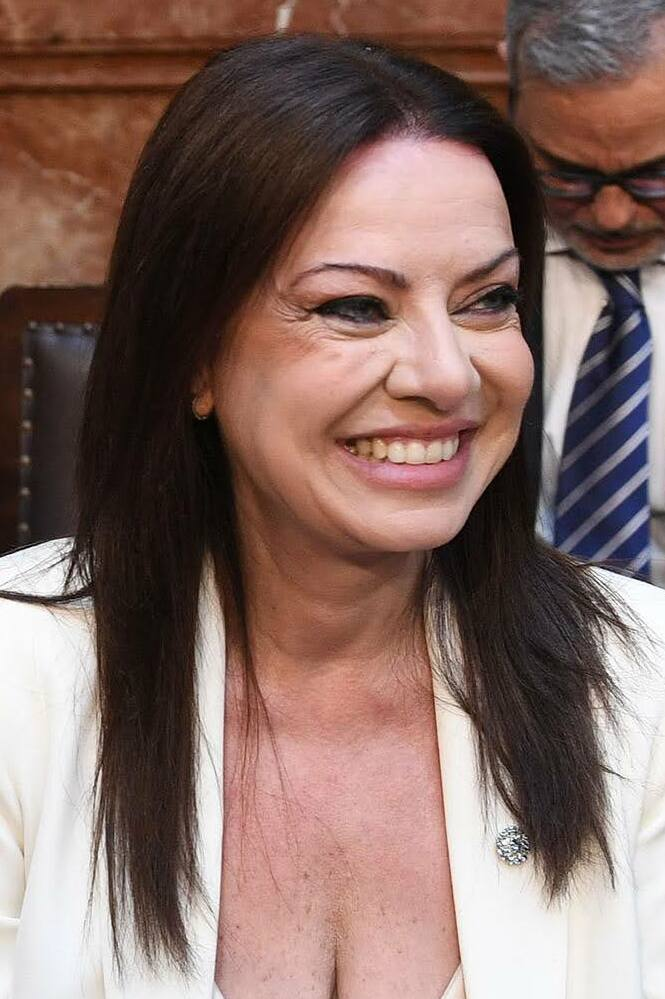

Sandra Pettovello
Argentine politician

== Honorary doctorates ==
The university maintains a record of people invested as doctors honoris causa. The first honorary doctorate awarded by the Universitat Internacional de Catalunya was received by Ramon Guardans i Vallès in 2005. More recent recipients include Aldo Roberto Boccaccini and Janne Haaland Matláry, invested in 2025; Eduardo Bruera, invested in 2023; Verónica Boix-Mansilla and Paul Levi, invested in 2021; and Rivka Oxman and Pierpaolo Donati, invested in 2017.

Year	Honorary doctor
2005	Ramon Guardans i Vallès
2008	Rafael Pich-Aguilera Girona; Peter Franz Riederer
2010	Joaquín Navarro-Valls; Valentí Fuster Carulla
2017	Rivka Oxman; Pierpaolo Donati
2021	Verónica Boix-Mansilla; Paul Levi
2023	Eduardo Bruera
2025	Aldo Roberto Boccaccini; Janne Haaland Matláry

== See also ==
- Xarxa Vives d'Universitats
- European University Association
