= Ministry of Human Capital =

Government ministry of Argentina

- Ministerio de Capital Humano
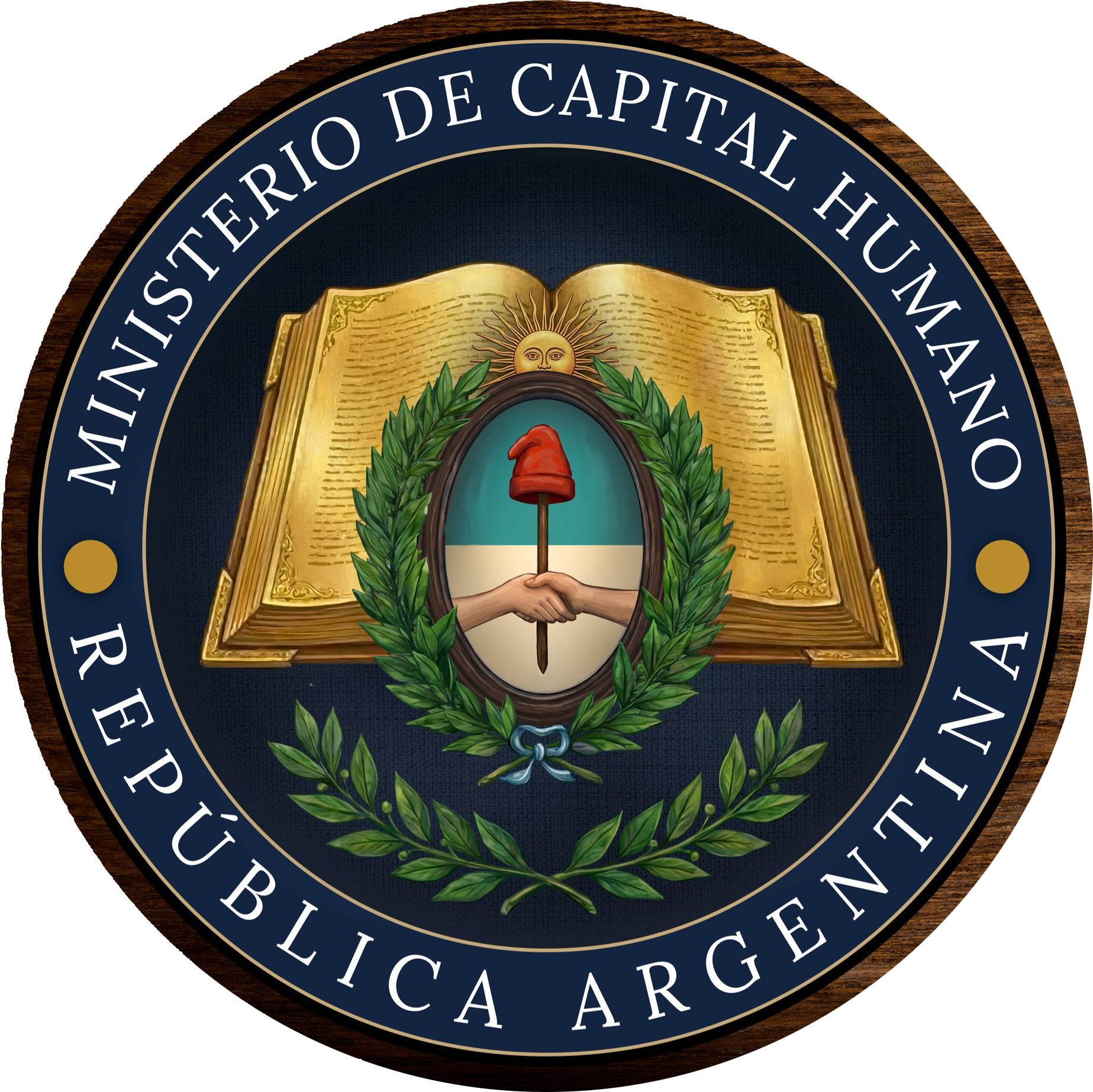

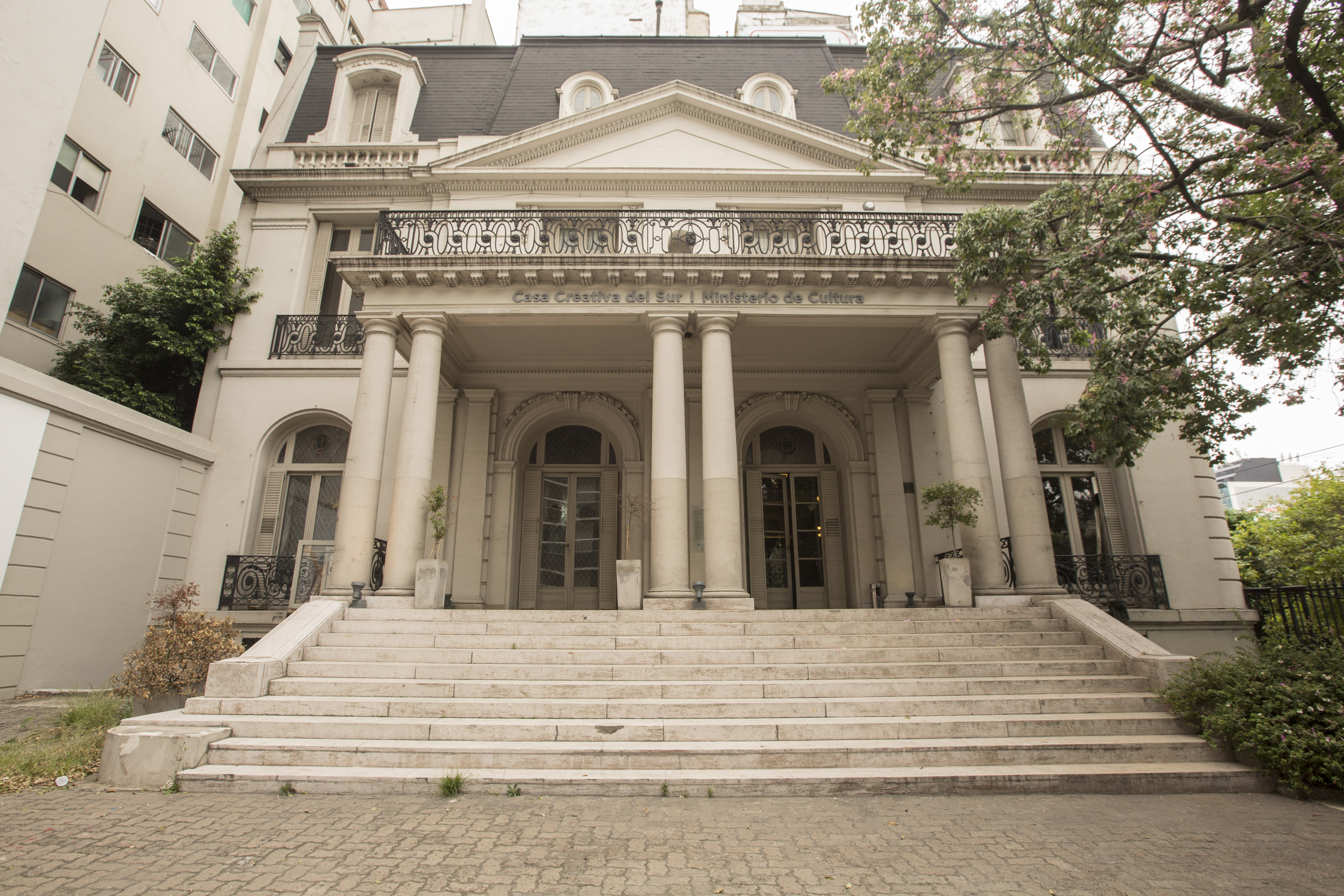
- Seat of the Ministry in Buenos Aires

Ministry overview
- Formed: 10 December 2023; 2 years ago
- Preceding agencies: Ministry of Culture; Ministry of Education; Ministry of Labour; Ministry of Social Development
- Jurisdiction: Government of Argentina
- Minister responsible: Sandra Pettovello
- Child agencies: Fondo Nacional de las Artes; Secretariat of Culture; Secretariat of Labour
- Website: argentina.gob.ar/capitalhumano

The Ministry of Human Capital (Spanish: Ministerio de Capital Humano) of Argentina is a ministry of the national executive power responsible for labour, education, culture and social welfare.

The incumbent minister is Sandra Pettovello, who has served since 10 December 2023 in the cabinet of Javier Milei, who created the ministry through a presidential decree.

== History ==
During the presidential campaign, Javier Milei promised to reduce the total number of existing ministries and create new bodies which would bring together several areas in order to cut public expenditure. Before the inauguration of the libertarian, the areas of labour, education, culture and social welfare each had their own ministry within the Government of Argentina. The Ministry of Human Capital can therefore be considered as the merging of the ministries of Labour, Employment and Social Security, Education, Culture and Social Development under the concept of Human Capital introduced by Nobel laurate in Economics Gary Becker.

On 10 December 2023, on his very first day as President of Argentina, Milei modified the ministries law and reduced the previous 19 government ministries to nine. While planned to be removed and included in this portfolio, the Ministry of Health was ultimately kept by the president and attributed to cardiologist Mario Russo. As stipulated in the presidential decree, the Ministry of Human Capital "concentrate policies regarding education, culture, work and social development in order to achieve the maximum development of human capital". The same day, Sandra Pettovello was then appointed head of the ministry. A member of the liberal conservative UCEDE party who campaigned for La Libertad Avanza and a former journalist, she was elected National Deputy for Buenos Aires before being appointed minister.

== Organisation ==
=== Branches ===
Former ministries turned into secretariats:

- Culture
- Education
- Labour, Employment and Social Security

=== Agencies ===
- Fondo Nacional de las Artes

=== List of ministers ===
No.	Minister	Party	Coalition	Term	President
1	Sandra Pettovello	UCEDE	LLA	10 December 2023 – present	Javier Milei
