= Secretariat of Labour, Employment and Social Security (Argentina) =

- Secretaría de Trabajo, Empleo y Seguridad Social
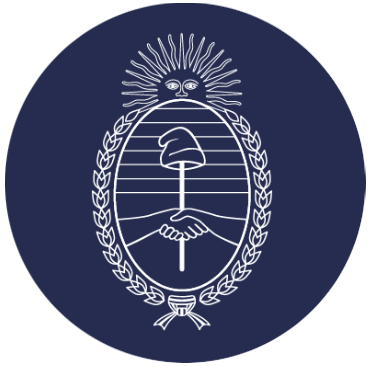

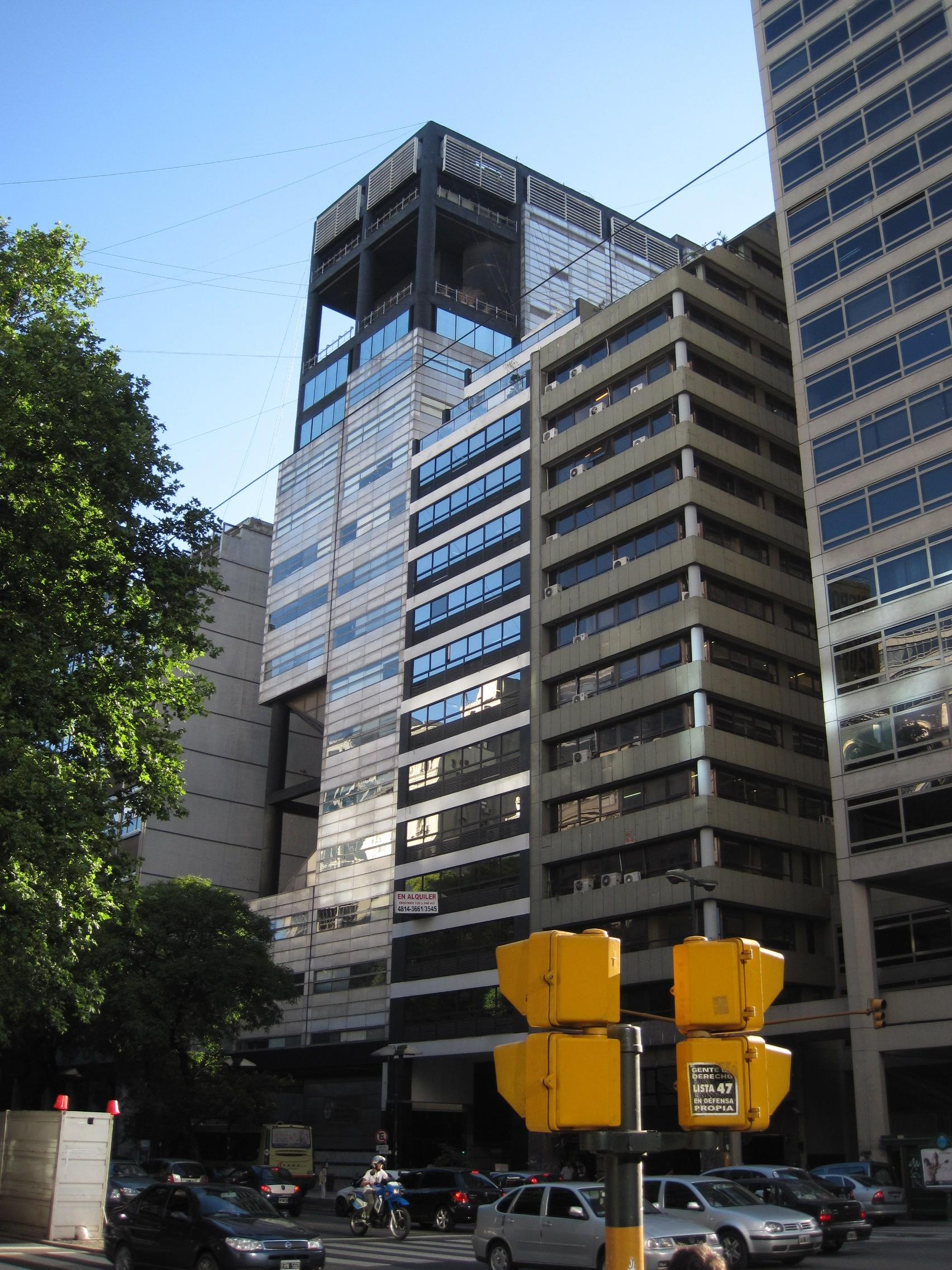
- Edificio CASFPI in Buenos Aires, headquarters

Secretariat overview
- Formed: December 1943; 82 years ago
- Preceding Secretariat: Secretariat of Labour and Prevision (1943–49)
- Superseding Secretariat: Ministry of Human Capital
- Jurisdiction: Government of Argentina
- Headquarters: Edificio CASFPI, Buenos Aires
- Annual budget: $ 3,693,758,343,111
- Secretariat executive: Omar Yasín, Secretary
- Child agencies: ANSES
- Website: argentina.gob.ar/trabajo

The Secretariat of Labour, Employment and Social Security (Spanish: Secretaría de Trabajo, Empleo y Seguridad Social) is a secreariat and former ministry of the Argentine Government tasked with overseeing the country's public policies on labour conditions, employment and social security. It was established in December 1943.

It proposes, designs, elaborates, administers and supervises the policies in all that is inherent to the relations and individual and collective conditions of work, to the legal regime of collective bargaining and of the professional associations of workers and employers, to employment, job training and social security. In addition, it was informally tasked with overseeing the government's relationship with Argentina's trade unions.

The secretariat is under the guidance of Ministry of Human Capital since its inception in 2023.

== History ==
It was founded in 1943 by Decree-Law No. 15,074 as the Secretariat of Labour and Prevision (STYP), assuming the functions of the former National Department of Labor, but also incorporating different agencies that previously functioned in various government agencies, such as the National Retirement and Pension Fund, the National Directorate of Public Health and Social Assistance, the National Board for Combat Unemployment, and the Rental Chamber, among others. The secretariat was then elevated to ministerial level in the first cabinet of President Juan Perón; the first minister was José María Freire.

Its function was to centralize all the social action of the State and supervise compliance with labor laws, for which it had regional delegations throughout the country.5 The services and powers of a conciliatory and conciliatory nature were also transferred to the Secretariat. arbitration, as well as the functions of labor police, industrial hygiene services, inspection of mutual associations and those related to maritime, river and port work. At the same time, the labor departments, directorates or offices and the existing organizations and services in the provinces were converted into regional Labor and Welfare delegations.

It was briefly disestablished during the dictatorship of Juan Carlos Onganía, being restored during the third and last presidency of Perón in 1973. It was also demoted to a secretariat for a short period during the presidency of Mauricio Macri, from 2018 to 2019.

The ministry was dissolved on December 10, 2023, following a presidential decree from President Javier Milei, and incorporated as a secretariat supervised by the Ministry of Human Capital. Omar Yasín was appointed as secretary.

== List of ministers and secretaries ==
No	Minister	Party	Term	President
Ministry of Labour and Prevision (1949–1958)
1	José María Freire	PJ	7 June 1949 – 6 April 1953	Juan Perón
2	Alejandro Giavarini	PJ	6 April 1953 – 21 September 1955	Juan Perón
3	Luis Cerruti Costa	Independent	21 September 1955 – 14 November 1955	Eduardo Lonardi
4	Raúl Carlos Migone	Independent	14 November 1955 – 21 September 1956	Pedro Eugenio Aramburu
5	Horacio Aguirre Legarreta	PD	26 September 1956 – 16 November 1956	Pedro Eugenio Aramburu
6	Alberto Mercier	Independent	17 November 1956 – 29 January 1957	Pedro Eugenio Aramburu
7	Tristán Guevara	PDP	30 January 1957 – 30 April 1958	Pedro Eugenio Aramburu
Ministry of Labour and Social Security (1958–1966)
8	Alfredo Allende	UCRI	18 June 1958 – 11 February 1959	Arturo Frondizi
9	David Bléjer	UCRI	11 February 1959 – 30 December 1960	Arturo Frondizi
10	Guillermo Acuña Anzorena	UCRI	30 December 1960 – 30 June 1961	Arturo Frondizi
11	Ismael Bruno Quijano	UCRI	30 June 1961 – 26 March 1962	Arturo Frondizi
12	Oscar Puiggrós	PDC	27 March 1962 – 29 April 1962	José María Guido
13	Galileo Puente	Independent	29 April 1962 – 28 February 1963	José María Guido
14	Alberto Rodríguez Galán	Independent	28 February 1963 – 11 March 1963	José María Guido
15	Rodolfo Martelli	Independent	12 March 1963 – 14 May 1963	José María Guido
16	Bernardo Bas	Independent	15 May 1963 – 11 October 1963	José María Guido
17	Fernando Solá	UCR	12 October 1963 – 28 June 1966	Arturo Illia
Ministry of Labour (1971–1989)
18	Rubens San Sebastián	Independent	30 May 1971 – 25 March 1973	Alejandro Lanusse
19	Ricardo Otero	PJ	25 March 1973 – 12 October 1973	Héctor Cámpora
19	Ricardo Otero	PJ	12 October 1973 – 1 July 1974	Juan Perón
19	Ricardo Otero	PJ	1 July 1974 – 29 June 1975	Isabel Perón
20	Cecilio Conditi	PJ	29 June 1975 – 11 August 1975	Isabel Perón
21	Carlos Ruckauf	PJ	11 August 1975 – 3 February 1976	Isabel Perón
22	Miguel Unamuno	PJ	3 February 1976 – 24 March 1976	Isabel Perón
23	Horacio Tomás Liendo	Independent (Military)	29 March 1976 – 8 February 1979	Jorge Rafael Videla
24	Llamil Reston	Independent (Military)	8 February 1979 – 29 March 1981	Jorge Rafael Videla
25	Julio Porcile	Independent (Military)	29 March 1981 – 2 July 1982	Roberto Viola
25	Julio Porcile	Independent (Military)	29 March 1981 – 2 July 1982	Carlos Lacoste
25	Julio Porcile	Independent (Military)	29 March 1981 – 2 July 1982	Leopoldo Galtieri
25	Julio Porcile	Independent (Military)	29 March 1981 – 2 July 1982	Alfredo Saint-Jean
26	Héctor Villaveirán	Independent	2 July 1982 – 10 December 1983	Reynaldo Bignone
27	Antonio Mucci	UCR	10 December 1983 – 24 April 1984	Raúl Alfonsín
28	Juan Manuel Casella	UCR	24 April 1984 – 31 October 1984	Raúl Alfonsín
29	Hugo Barrionuevo	PJ	31 October 1984 – 27 March 1987	Raúl Alfonsín
30	Carlos Alderete	PJ	27 March 1987 – 16 September 1987	Raúl Alfonsín
31	Ideler Tonelli	UCR	16 September 1987 – 7 July 1989	Raúl Alfonsín
Ministry of Labour and Social Security (1989–1999)
32	Jorge Alberto Triaca	PJ	8 July 1989 – 16 January 1992	Carlos Menem
33	Rodolfo Díaz	PJ	16 January 1992 – 4 December 1992	Carlos Menem
34	Enrique Rodríguez	PJ	4 December 1992 – 22 December 1993	Carlos Menem
35	Armando Caro Figueroa	PJ	22 December 1993 – 5 December 1997	Carlos Menem
36	Antonio Erman González	PDC	5 December 1997 – 26 May 1999	Carlos Menem
37	José Alberto Uriburu	Independent	26 May 1999 – 10 December 1999	Carlos Menem
Ministry of Labour, Employment and Human Resources (1999–2001)
38	Alberto Flamarique	UCR	10 December 1999 – 6 October 2000	Fernando de la Rúa
39	Patricia Bullrich	Nueva Dirigencia	6 October 2000 – 29 October 2001	Fernando de la Rúa
40	José Gabriel Dumón	UCR	29 October 2001 – 21 December 2001	Fernando de la Rúa
41	Oraldo Britos	PJ	23 December 2001 – 30 December 2001	Adolfo Rodríguez Saá
Ministry of Labour, Employment and Social Security (2002–2018)
42	Alfredo Atanasof	PJ	3 January 2002 – 3 May 2002	Eduardo Duhalde
43	Graciela Camaño	PJ	3 May 2002 – 25 May 2003	Eduardo Duhalde
44	Carlos Tomada	PJ	25 May 2003 – 10 December 2015	Néstor Kirchner
44	Carlos Tomada	PJ	25 May 2003 – 10 December 2015	Cristina Fernández de Kirchner
45	Jorge Triaca Jr.	PRO	10 December 2015 – 5 September 2018	Mauricio Macri
Ministry of Production and Labour (2018–2019)
46	Dante Sica	Independent	5 September 2018 – 10 December 2019	Mauricio Macri
Ministry of Labour, Employment and Social Security (2019–2023)
47	Claudio Moroni	PJ	10 December 2019 – 13 October 2022	Alberto Fernández
48	Kelly Olmos	PJ	13 October 2022 – 10 December 2023	Alberto Fernández
Secretariat of Labour, Employment and Social Security (2023–)
49	Omar Yasín	PRO	10 Dec 2023–present	Javier Milei
