= List of Argentine deputies, 2021–2023 =

This is a list of members of the Argentine Chamber of Deputies from 10 December 2021 to 10 December 2023.

== Composition ==
=== By province ===
Province	Deputies	Population (2010)
Buenos Aires	70	15,625,084
Buenos Aires City	25	2,890,151
Catamarca	5	367,828
Chaco	7	1,053,466
Chubut	5	506,668
Córdoba	18	3,304,825
Corrientes	7	993,338
Entre Ríos	9	1,236,300
Formosa	5	527,895
Jujuy	6	672,260
La Pampa	5	316,940
La Rioja	5	331,847
Mendoza	10	1,741,610
Misiones	7	1,097,829
Neuquén	5	550,334
Río Negro	5	633,374
Salta	7	1,215,207
San Juan	6	680,427
San Luis	5	431,588
Santa Cruz	5	272,524
Santa Fe	19	3,200,736
Santiago del Estero	7	896,461
Tierra del Fuego	5	126,190
Tucumán	9	1,448,200

=== By political groups ===
Composition of the Chamber by political groups.

Inter-bloc	Bloc	Leader
Frente de Todos / Unión por la Patria (118)		Germán Martínez
Together for Change (117)	PRO (53)	Cristian Ritondo
Together for Change (117)	Radical Civic Union (33)	Mario Negri
Together for Change (117)	Radical Evolution (12)	Rodrigo de Loredo
Together for Change (117)	Civic Coalition (11)	Juan Manuel López
Together for Change (117)	Federal Encounter (4)	Margarita Stolbizer
Together for Change (117)	Production and Labour (2)	Marcelo Orrego
Together for Change (117)	Advance San Luis (1)	Claudio Poggi
Together for Change (117)	United Republicans (1)	Ricardo López Murphy
Together for Change (117)	Fatherland Now (1)	Carlos Raúl Zapata
Together for Change (117)	CREO (1)	Paula Omodeo
Together for Change (117)	Independent	José Luis Espert
Federal (8) (President: Alejandro "Topo" Rodríguez)	Federal Córdoba (3)	Carlos Gutiérrez
Federal (8) (President: Alejandro "Topo" Rodríguez)	Bonaerense Identity (3)	Alejandro "Topo" Rodríguez
Federal (8) (President: Alejandro "Topo" Rodríguez)	Socialist Party (2)	Enrique Estévez
United Provinces (5) (President: Luis Di Giacomo)	Together We Are Río Negro (2)	Luis Di Giacomo
United Provinces (5) (President: Luis Di Giacomo)	Misiones Front for Concord (2)	Diego Sartori
United Provinces (5) (President: Luis Di Giacomo)	Neuquén People's Movement (1)	Rolando Figueroa
Workers' Left Front–Unity (4)		Myriam Bregman
La Libertad Avanza (2)		Javier Milei
SER – We Are Energy to Renovate (2)		Felipe Álvarez
Source: hcdn.gob.ar (last update: 11 December 2021)

== Election cycles ==
Election	Term	
Election	Start	End
2019	10 December 2019	10 December 2023
2021	10 December 2021	10 December 2025

== List of deputies ==
The table is sorted by provinces in alphabetical order, and then with their deputies in alphabetical order by their surnames. All deputies start their term on December 10, and end it on December 9 of the corresponding years, except when noted.

Province	Portrait	Deputy	Bloc	Term start	Term end
Buenos Aires		Juan Carlos Alderete	Frente de Todos, then Unión por la Patria	2019 (Note: Since 19 December 2020. Replaced Carlos Castagneto.)	2023
Buenos Aires		Constanza María Alonso	Frente de Todos, then Unión por la Patria	2021	2025
Buenos Aires		Alicia Noemí Aparicio	Frente de Todos, then Unión por la Patria	2019	2023
Buenos Aires		Daniel Fernando Arroyo	Frente de Todos, then Unión por la Patria	2021	2025
Buenos Aires		Alberto Asseff	PRO	2019	2023
Buenos Aires		Karina Banfi	UCR	2019	2023
Buenos Aires		Miguel Ángel Bazze	UCR	2019	2023
Buenos Aires		Gabriela Besana	PRO	2021	2025
Buenos Aires		Lisandro Bormioli	Frente de Todos, then Unión por la Patria	2020 (Note: Since 13 May 2020. Replaced Andrés Larroque.)	2023
Buenos Aires		Victoria Borrego	Civic Coalition	2021	2025
Buenos Aires		Graciela Camaño	Bonaerense Identity	2019	2023
Buenos Aires		Marcela Campagnoli	Civic Coalition	2021	2025
Buenos Aires		Camila Crescimbeni	PRO	2019	2023
Buenos Aires		Nicolás del Caño	Workers' Left Front–Unity	2021	2025
Buenos Aires		Romina del Plá	Workers' Left Front–Unity	2021	2025
Buenos Aires		José Luis Espert	Avanza Libertad, then independent	2021	2025
Buenos Aires		Federico Fagioli	Frente de Todos, then Unión por la Patria	2019 (Note: Since 19 December 2019. Replaced Eduardo de Pedro.)	2023
Buenos Aires		Alejandro Finocchiaro	PRO	2021	2025
Buenos Aires		Mónica Edith Frade	Civic Coalition	2019	2023
Buenos Aires		Raúl Sebastián García De Luca	Federal Encounter	2019	2023
Buenos Aires		Daniel Gollán	Frente de Todos, then Unión por la Patria	2021	2025
Buenos Aires		Leonardo Grosso	Frente de Todos, then Unión por la Patria	2019	2023
Buenos Aires		Ramiro Gutiérrez	Frente de Todos, then Unión por la Patria	2019	2023
Buenos Aires		Rogelio Iparraguirre	Frente de Todos, then Unión por la Patria	2021	2025
Buenos Aires		María de las Mercedes Joury	PRO	2019	2023
Buenos Aires		Máximo Carlos Kirchner	Frente de Todos, then Unión por la Patria	2019	2023
Buenos Aires		Florencia Lampreabe	Frente de Todos, then Unión por la Patria	2019	2023
Buenos Aires		Mónica Litza	Frente de Todos, then Unión por la Patria	2021	2025
Buenos Aires		Hernán Lombardi	PRO	2021	2025
Buenos Aires		María Jimena López	Frente de Todos, then Unión por la Patria	2019 (Note: Since 19 December 2019. Replaced Luana Volnovich.)	2023
Buenos Aires		Juan Manuel López	Civic Coalition	2021	2025
Buenos Aires		Silvia Gabriela Lospennato	PRO	2019	2023
Buenos Aires		Mónica Macha	Frente de Todos, then Unión por la Patria	2021	2025
Buenos Aires		Facundo Manes	UCR	2021	2025
Buenos Aires		María Rosa Martínez	Frente de Todos, then Unión por la Patria	2019	2023
Buenos Aires		Sergio Tomás Massa	Frente de Todos, then Unión por la Patria	2019	2022 (Note: Resigned on 2 August 2022 to take office as Minister of Economy. Replaced by Juan Marino.)
Buenos Aires		Gerardo Milman	PRO	2021	2025
Buenos Aires		Emilio Monzó	Federal Encounter	2021	2025
Buenos Aires		Micaela Morán	Frente de Todos, then Unión por la Patria	2022 (Note: Since 12 October 2022. Replaced Victoria Tolosa Paz.)	2025
Buenos Aires		Cecilia Moreau	Frente de Todos, then Unión por la Patria	2019	2023
Buenos Aires		Leopoldo Raúl Guido Moreau	Frente de Todos, then Unión por la Patria	2021	2025
Buenos Aires		María Graciela Ocaña	PRO	2021	2025
Buenos Aires		Claudia Beatriz Ormachea	Frente de Todos, then Unión por la Patria	2019	2023
Buenos Aires		Sergio Omar Palazzo	Frente de Todos, then Unión por la Patria	2021	2025
Buenos Aires		Marcela Fabiana Passo	Frente de Todos, then Unión por la Patria	2021	2025
Buenos Aires		Julio César Pereyra	Frente de Todos, then Unión por la Patria	2021	2025
Buenos Aires		Carolina Píparo	Avanza Libertad, then Free Buenos Aires	2021	2025
Buenos Aires		Agustina Lucrecia Propato	Frente de Todos, then Unión por la Patria	2021	2025
Buenos Aires		Fabio José Quetglas	UCR	2021	2025
Buenos Aires		Aníbal Florencio Randazzo	Bonaerense Identity	2021	2025
Buenos Aires		María Luján Rey	PRO	2019	2023
Buenos Aires		Cristian Adrián Ritondo	PRO	2019	2023
Buenos Aires		Alejandro "Topo" Rodríguez	Bonaerense Identity	2019	2023
Buenos Aires		Sebastián Nicolás Salvador	UCR	2019	2023
Buenos Aires		Diego César Santilli	PRO	2021	2025
Buenos Aires		Carlos Américo Selva	Frente de Todos, then Unión por la Patria	2019	2023
Buenos Aires		Vanesa Raquel Siley	Frente de Todos, then Unión por la Patria	2021	2025
Buenos Aires		María Sotolano	PRO	2021	2025
Buenos Aires		Natalia Marcela Souto	Frente de Todos, then Unión por la Patria	2021 (Note: Since 26 October 2021. Replaced Cristina Álvarez Rodríguez.)	2023
Buenos Aires		Mariana Stilman	Civic Coalition	2019	2023
Buenos Aires		Margarita Rosa Stolbizer	Federal Encounter	2021	2025
Buenos Aires		Luis Rodolfo Tailhade	Frente de Todos, then Unión por la Patria	2019	2023
Buenos Aires		Danya Tavela	Radical Evolution	2021	2025
Buenos Aires		Victoria Tolosa Paz	Frente de Todos, then Unión por la Patria	2021	2022 (Note: Resigned on 11 October 2022 to take office as Minister of Social Development. Replaced by Micaela Morán.)
Buenos Aires		Pablo Torello	PRO	2019	2023
Buenos Aires		Brenda Vargas Matyi	Frente de Todos, then Unión por la Patria	2021	2025
Buenos Aires		Waldo Ezequiel Wolff	PRO	2019	2023
Buenos Aires		Liliana Patricia Yambrún	Frente de Todos, then Unión por la Patria	2019	2023
Buenos Aires		Lucio Yapor	Frente de Todos, then Unión por la Patria	2021 (Note: Since 26 October 2021. Replaced Facundo Moyano.)	2023
Buenos Aires		Hugo Yasky	Frente de Todos, then Unión por la Patria	2021	2025
Buenos Aires		Natalia Zaracho	Frente de Todos, then Unión por la Patria	2021 (Note: Since 16 December 2021. Replaced Daniela Vilar.)	2023
Buenos Aires City		Sabrina Ajmechet	PRO	2021	2025
Buenos Aires City		Mara Brawer	Frente de Todos, then Unión por la Patria	2019 (Note: Since 19 December 2019. Replaced Victoria Donda.)	2023
Buenos Aires City		Myriam Bregman	Workers' Left Front–Unity	2021	2025
Buenos Aires City		Ana Carla Carrizo	Radical Evolution	2021	2025
Buenos Aires City		Maximiliano Carlos Francisco Ferraro	Civic Coalition	2019	2023
Buenos Aires City		Álvaro Gustavo González	PRO	2019	2023
Buenos Aires City		Itai Hagman	Frente de Todos, then Unión por la Patria	2019	2023
Buenos Aires City		Carlos Salomón Heller	Frente de Todos, then Unión por la Patria	2021	2025
Buenos Aires City		Fernando Adolfo Iglesias	PRO	2021	2025
Buenos Aires City		Ricardo López Murphy	United Republicans	2021	2025
Buenos Aires City		María Dolores Martínez	Radical Evolution	2019	2023
Buenos Aires City		Gisela Marziotta	Frente de Todos, then Unión por la Patria	2021	2025
Buenos Aires City		Javier Gerardo Milei	La Libertad Avanza	2021	2025
Buenos Aires City		Victoria Morales Gorleri	PRO	2019	2023
Buenos Aires City		Paula Mariana Oliveto Lago	Civic Coalition	2021	2025
Buenos Aires City		Paula Andrea Penacca	Frente de Todos, then Unión por la Patria	2019	2023
Buenos Aires City		Dina Esther Rezinovsky	PRO	2019	2023
Buenos Aires City		Leandro Santoro	Frente de Todos, then Unión por la Patria	2021	2025
Buenos Aires City		Martín Alberto Tetaz	Radical Evolution	2021	2025
Buenos Aires City		Pablo Gabriel Tonelli	PRO	2019	2023
Buenos Aires City		Eduardo Félix Valdés	Frente de Todos, then Unión por la Patria	2019	2023
Buenos Aires City		María Eugenia Vidal	PRO	2021	2025
Buenos Aires City		Victoria Villarruel	La Libertad Avanza	2021	2025
Buenos Aires City		Emiliano Benjamín Yacobitti	Radical Evolution	2019	2023
Buenos Aires City		Mariana de Jesús Zuvic	Civic Coalition	2019	2023
Catamarca		Anahí Costa	Frente de Todos, then Unión por la Patria	2021 (Note: Since 16 December 2021. Replaced Lucía Corpacci.)	2023
Catamarca		Silvana Micaela Ginocchio	Frente de Todos, then Unión por la Patria	2021	2025
Catamarca		Dante Edgardo López Rodríguez	Frente de Todos, then Unión por la Patria	2021	2025
Catamarca		Rubén Manzi	Civic Coalition	2019	2023
Catamarca		Francisco Monti	Civic Coalition	2021	2025
Chaco		María Luisa Chomiak	Frente de Todos, then Unión por la Patria	2021	2025
Chaco		Gerardo Cipolini	UCR	2019	2023
Chaco		Aldo Adolfo Leiva	Frente de Todos, then Unión por la Patria	2019	2023
Chaco		María Lucila Masin	Frente de Todos, then Unión por la Patria	2019	2023
Chaco		Juan Manuel Pedrini	Frente de Todos, then Unión por la Patria	2021	2025
Chaco		Juan Carlos Polini	UCR	2021	2025
Chaco		Marilú Quiroz	PRO	2021	2025
Chubut		Eugenia Alianiello	Frente de Todos, then Unión por la Patria	2021	2025
Chubut		Estela Beatriz Hernández	Frente de Todos, then Unión por la Patria	2019	2023
Chubut		Santiago Nicolás Igon	Frente de Todos, then Unión por la Patria	2019	2023
Chubut		Ana Clara Romero	PRO	2021	2025
Chubut		Matías Taccetta	PRO	2021 (Note: Since 16 December 2021. Replaced Ignacio Torres.)	2023
Córdoba		Héctor Baldassi	PRO	2021	2025
Córdoba		Gabriela Brouwer de Koning	Radical Evolution	2021	2025
Córdoba		María Soledad Carrizo	UCR	2021	2025
Córdoba		Pablo Carro	Frente de Todos, then Unión por la Patria	2021	2025
Córdoba		Natalia de la Sota	Federal Córdoba	2021	2025
Córdoba		Rodrigo de Loredo	Radical Evolution	2021	2025
Córdoba		Soher El Sukaria	PRO	2019	2023
Córdoba		Gabriela Beatriz Estévez	Frente de Todos, then Unión por la Patria	2019	2023
Córdoba		Eduardo Gabriel Fernández	Frente de Todos, then Unión por la Patria	2019	2023
Córdoba		Ignacio García Aresca	Federal Córdoba	2021	2025
Córdoba		Carlos Mario Gutiérrez	Federal Córdoba	2019	2023
Córdoba		Marcos Carasso	UCR	2021 (Note: Since 16 December 2021. Replaced Luis Juez.)	2023
Córdoba		Leonor María Martínez Villada	Civic Coalition	2019	2023
Córdoba		Mario Raúl Negri	UCR	2019	2023
Córdoba		Laura Elena Rodríguez Machado	PRO	2021	2025
Córdoba		Víctor Hugo Romero	UCR	2019	2023
Córdoba		Adriana Noemí Ruarte	PRO	2019	2023
Córdoba		Gustavo Santos	PRO	2021	2025
Corrientes		Manuel Ignacio Aguirre	Frente de Todos, then Unión por la Patria	2021	2025
Corrientes		Fabián Borda	Frente de Todos, then Unión por la Patria	2021 (Note: Since 16 December 2021. Replaced José Ruiz Aragón.)	2023
Corrientes		Sofía Brambilla	PRO	2021	2025
Corrientes		Ingrid Jetter	PRO	2019	2023
Corrientes		Jorge Antonio Romero	Frente de Todos, then Unión por la Patria	2021	2025
Corrientes		Nancy Sand	Frente de Todos, then Unión por la Patria	2019	2023
Corrientes		Jorge Vara	UCR	2019	2023
Entre Ríos		Marcela Antola	Radical Evolution	2021	2025
Entre Ríos		Marcelo Pablo Casaretto	Frente de Todos, then Unión por la Patria	2019	2023
Entre Ríos		Rogelio Frigerio	PRO	2021	2025
Entre Ríos		Ana Carolina Gaillard	Frente de Todos, then Unión por la Patria	2021	2025
Entre Ríos		Pedro Jorge Galimberti	UCR	2021	2025
Entre Ríos		Gustavo René Hein	PRO	2019	2023
Entre Ríos		Tomás Ledesma	Frente de Todos, then Unión por la Patria	2021	2025
Entre Ríos		Gabriela Mabel Lena	UCR	2019	2023
Entre Ríos		Blanca Inés Osuna	Frente de Todos, then Unión por la Patria	2019	2023
Formosa		Ricardo Buryaile	UCR	2019	2023
Formosa		Fernando Carbajal	UCR	2021	2025
Formosa		Nelly Ramona Daldovo	Frente de Todos, then Unión por la Patria	2019	2023
Formosa		Gustavo Ramiro Fernández Patri	Frente de Todos, then Unión por la Patria	2021	2025
Formosa		María Graciela Parola	Frente de Todos, then Unión por la Patria	2019	2023
Jujuy		Gustavo Bouhid	UCR	2021	2025
Jujuy		Leila Chaher	Frente de Todos, then Unión por la Patria	2021	2025
Jujuy		Daniel Julio Ferreyra	Frente de Todos, then Unión por la Patria	2019	2023
Jujuy		María Carolina Moisés	Frente de Todos, then Unión por la Patria	2019	2023
Jujuy		Jorge Raúl Rizzotti	UCR	2019	2023
Jujuy		Alejandro Ariel Vilca	Workers' Left Front–Unity	2021	2025
La Pampa		Martín Antonio Berhongaray	UCR	2019	2023
La Pampa		Marcela Coli	UCR	2021	2025
La Pampa		Martín Maquieyra	PRO	2021	2025
La Pampa		Varinia Lis Marín	Frente de Todos, then Unión por la Patria	2021	2025
La Pampa		Hernán Pérez Araujo	Frente de Todos, then Unión por la Patria	2019	2023
La Rioja		Hilda Clelia Aguirre de Soria	Frente de Todos, then Unión por la Patria	2019	2023
La Rioja		Diego Felipe Álvarez	SER – We Are Energy to Renovate	2019	2023
La Rioja		Sergio Guillermo Casas	Frente de Todos, then Unión por la Patria	2019	2023
La Rioja		Ricardo Herrera	Frente de Todos, then Unión por la Patria	2021	2025
La Rioja		Gabriela Pedrali	Frente de Todos, then Unión por la Patria	2021	2025
Mendoza		Adolfo Bermejo	Frente de Todos, then Unión por la Patria	2021	2025
Mendoza		Julio César Cleto Cobos	UCR	2021	2025
Mendoza		Omar Bruno De Marchi	PRO	2019	2023
Mendoza		Lisandro Nieri	UCR	2021 (Note: Since 10 December 2021. Replaced Alfredo Cornejo.)	2023
Mendoza		Jimena Hebe Latorre	UCR	2019	2023
Mendoza		Álvaro Martínez	PRO	2021	2025
Mendoza		Liliana Paponet	Frente de Todos, then Unión por la Patria	2021	2025
Mendoza		Eber Albano Pérez Plaza	Frente de Todos, then Unión por la Patria	2021 (Note: Since 27 March 2021. Replaced Alejandro Bermejo.)	2023
Mendoza		Marisa Lourdes Uceda	Frente de Todos, then Unión por la Patria	2019	2023
Mendoza		Pamela Fernanda Verasay	UCR	2021	2025
Misiones		Martín Arjol	UCR	2021	2025
Misiones		Héctor Orlando "Cacho" Bárbaro	Frente de Todos, then Unión por la Patria	2019	2023
Misiones		María Cristina Brítez	Frente de Todos, then Unión por la Patria	2019	2023
Misiones		Carlos Alberto Fernández	Misiones Front for Concord	2021 (Note: Since 16 December 2021.)	2025
Misiones		Florencia Klipauka Lewtak	PRO	2021	2025
Misiones		Diego Horacio Sartori	Misiones Front for Concord	2019	2023
Misiones		Alfredo Oscar Schiavoni	PRO	2019	2023
Neuquén		Tanya Bertoldi	Frente de Todos, then Unión por la Patria	2021	2025
Neuquén		Guillermo Oscar Carnaghi	Frente de Todos, then Unión por la Patria	2020 (Note: Since 24 September 2020. Replaced Darío Martínez.)	2023
Neuquén		Pablo Cervi	Radical Evolution	2021	2025
Neuquén		Rolando Figueroa	Neuquén People's Movement	2021	2025
Neuquén		Francisco Sánchez	PRO	2019	2023
Río Negro		Pedro Cristian Dantas	Frente de Todos, then Unión por la Patria	2021 (Note: Since 27 March 2021. Replaced Martín Soria.)	2023
Río Negro		Luis Di Giacomo	Together We Are Río Negro	2019	2023
Río Negro		Agustín Domingo	Together We Are Río Negro	2021	2025
Río Negro		Susana Graciela Landriscini	Frente de Todos, then Unión por la Patria	2019	2023
Río Negro		Aníbal Tortoriello	PRO	2021	2025
Salta		Lía Verónica Caliva	Frente de Todos, then Unión por la Patria	2019	2023
Salta		Pamela Calletti	Frente de Todos, then Unión por la Patria	2021	2025
Salta		Virginia María Cornejo	PRO	2019	2023
Salta		Emiliano Estrada	Frente de Todos, then Unión por la Patria	2021	2025
Salta		Lucas Javier Godoy	Frente de Todos, then Unión por la Patria	2019	2023
Salta		Miguel Nanni Valero	UCR	2019	2023
Salta		Carlos Raúl Zapata	Fatherland Now	2021	2025
San Juan		Walberto Enrique Allende	Frente de Todos, then Unión por la Patria	2021	2025
San Juan		Ana Fabiola Aubone	Frente de Todos, then Unión por la Patria	2021	2025
San Juan		Graciela María Caselles	Frente de Todos, then Unión por la Patria	2019	2023
San Juan		José Luis Gioja	Frente de Todos, then Unión por la Patria	2019	2023
San Juan		Susana Alicia Laciar	Production and Labour	2021	2025
San Juan		Humberto Marcelo Orrego	Production and Labour	2019	2023
San Luis		Karina Ethel Bachey	PRO	2021	2025
San Luis		Alejandro Cacace	Radical Evolution	2019	2023
San Luis		Claudio Javier Poggi	Advance San Luis	2021	2025
San Luis		Carlos Ybrhain Ponce	Frente de Todos, then Unión por la Patria	2019	2023
San Luis		María Natalia Zabala Chacur	Frente de Todos, then Unión por la Patria	2021 (Note: Resigned on 21 December 2021. Replaced by Natalia Zabala Chacur.)	2025
San Luis		María José Zanglá	Frente de Todos, then Unión por la Patria	2021	2021 (Note: Resigned on 21 December 2021. Replaced by Natalia Zabala Chacur.)
Santa Cruz		Gustavo Carlos Miguel González	Frente de Todos, then Unión por la Patria	2021 (Note: Since 16 December 2021.)	2025
Santa Cruz		Roxana Nahir Reyes	UCR	2021	2025
Santa Cruz		Jorge Guillermo Verón	Frente de Todos, then Unión por la Patria	2021 (Note: Since 2 February 2021. Replaced Pablo Gerardo González.)	2023
Santa Cruz		Marcela Paola Vessvessian	Frente de Todos, then Unión por la Patria	2019	2023
Santa Cruz		Claudio Orlando Vidal	SER – We Are Energy to Renovate	2021	2025
Santa Fe		Federico Angelini	PRO	2019	2023
Santa Fe		Mario Domingo Barletta	UCR	2021	2025
Santa Fe		Laura Carolina Castets	Civic Coalition	2019	2023
Santa Fe		Gabriel Felipe Angelini	PRO	2021	2025
Santa Fe		Marcos Cleri	Frente de Todos, then Unión por la Patria	2019	2023
Santa Fe		Enrique Eloy Estévez	Socialist	2019	2023
Santa Fe		Mónica Haydée Fein	Socialist	2021	2025
Santa Fe		Germana Figueroa Casas	PRO	2021	2025
Santa Fe		Ximena García	UCR	2019	2023
Santa Fe		Luciano Andrés Laspina	PRO	2021	2025
Santa Fe		Juan Martín	UCR	2019	2023
Santa Fe		Germán Pedro Martínez	Frente de Todos, then Unión por la Patria	2019	2023
Santa Fe		Vanesa Laura Massetani	Frente de Todos, then Unión por la Patria	2019	2023
Santa Fe		Magalí Mastaler	Frente de Todos, then Unión por la Patria	2021	2025
Santa Fe		Roberto Mario Mirabella	Frente de Todos, then Unión por la Patria	2021	2025
Santa Fe		José Carlos Núñez	PRO	2019	2023
Santa Fe		Alejandra del Huerto Obeid	Frente de Todos, then Unión por la Patria	2019	2023
Santa Fe		María Victoria Tejeda	PRO	2021	2025
Santa Fe		Eduardo Toniolli	Frente de Todos, then Unión por la Patria	2021	2025
Santiago del Estero		Daniel Agustín Brue	Frente de Todos, then Unión por la Patria	2019	2023
Santiago del Estero		Ricardo Daniel Daives	Frente de Todos, then Unión por la Patria	2019	2023
Santiago del Estero		Bernardo José Herrera	Frente de Todos, then Unión por la Patria	2021	2025
Santiago del Estero		María Luisa Montoto de Rogel	Frente de Todos, then Unión por la Patria	2021	2025
Santiago del Estero		Nilda Moyano	Frente de Todos, then Unión por la Patria	2021 (Note: Since 16 December 2021. Replaced Silvia Sayago.)	2025
Santiago del Estero		Graciela Navarro	Frente de Todos, then Unión por la Patria	2019	2023
Santiago del Estero		Estela Mary Neder	Frente de Todos, then Unión por la Patria	2019	2023
Santiago del Estero		Silvia Noemí del Valle Sayago	Frente de Todos, then Unión por la Patria	2021	2021 (Note: Died on 12 December 2021. Replaced by Nilda Moyano.)
Tierra del Fuego		Rosana Andrea Bertone	Frente de Todos, then Unión por la Patria	2019	2023
Tierra del Fuego		Mabel Luisa Caparrós	Frente de Todos, then Unión por la Patria	2019	2023
Tierra del Fuego		Federico Frigerio	PRO	2019	2023
Tierra del Fuego		Héctor Antonio Stefani	PRO	2021	2025
Tierra del Fuego		Inés Carolina Yutrovic	Frente de Todos, then Unión por la Patria	2021	2025
Tucumán		Domingo Luis Amaya	Federal Encounter	2019	2023
Tucumán		Lidia Inés Ascárate	UCR	2019	2023
Tucumán		Nilda Mabel Carrizo	Frente de Todos, then Unión por la Patria	2019	2023
Tucumán		Rossana Chahla	Frente de Todos, then Unión por la Patria	2021	2025
Tucumán		Carlos Aníbal Cisneros	Frente de Todos, then Unión por la Patria	2019	2023
Tucumán		Agustín Fernández	Frente de Todos, then Unión por la Patria	2021	2025
Tucumán		Mario Alberto Leito	Frente de Todos, then Unión por la Patria	2019	2023
Tucumán		Paula Omodeo	CREO	2021	2025
Tucumán		Roberto Antonio Sánchez	Frente de Todos, then Unión por la Patria	2021	2025
