= List of Argentine deputies, 2019–2021 =

This is a list of members of the Argentine Chamber of Deputies from 10 December 2019 to 9 December 2021.

== Composition ==
=== By province ===
Province	Deputies	Population (2010)
Buenos Aires	70	15,625,084
Buenos Aires City	25	2,890,151
Catamarca	5	367,828
Chaco	7	1,053,466
Chubut	5	506,668
Córdoba	18	3,304,825
Corrientes	7	993,338
Entre Ríos	9	1,236,300
Formosa	5	527,895
Jujuy	6	672,260
La Pampa	5	316,940
La Rioja	5	331,847
Mendoza	10	1,741,610
Misiones	7	1,097,829
Neuquén	5	550,334
Río Negro	5	633,374
Salta	7	1,215,207
San Juan	6	680,427
San Luis	5	431,588
Santa Cruz	5	272,524
Santa Fe	19	3,200,736
Santiago del Estero	7	896,461
Tierra del Fuego	5	126,190
Tucumán	9	1,448,200

=== By political groups ===
Alliance	Party	Leader
Everybody's Front (120)		Máximo Kirchner
Together for Change (115) (President: Mario Negri)	PRO (53)	Cristian Ritondo
Together for Change (115) (President: Mario Negri)	Radical Civic Union (46)	Mario Negri
Together for Change (115) (President: Mario Negri)	Civic Coalition (14)	Maximiliano Ferraro
Together for Change (115) (President: Mario Negri)	Production and Labour (1)	Marcelo Orrego
Federal (10) (President: Alejandro "Topo" Rodríguez)	Federal Córdoba (4)	Carlos Gutiérrez
Federal (10) (President: Alejandro "Topo" Rodríguez)	Federal Consensus (3)	Alejandro "Topo" Rodríguez
Federal (10) (President: Alejandro "Topo" Rodríguez)	Justicialist (1)	Andrés Zottos
Federal (10) (President: Alejandro "Topo" Rodríguez)	Progressive, Civic and Social Front (1)	Luis Contigiani
Federal (10) (President: Alejandro "Topo" Rodríguez)	Socialist Party (1)	Enrique Estévez
Federal Unity for Development (6) (President: José Luis Ramón)	Misiones Front for Concord (3)	Ricardo Wellbach
Federal Unity for Development (6) (President: José Luis Ramón)	Federal Unity and Equity (2)	José Luis Ramón
Federal Unity for Development (6) (President: José Luis Ramón)	Together We Are Río Negro (1)	Luis Di Giacomo
Federal Action (2)		Felipe Álvarez
Socialist Left–Left Front (2)		Juan Carlos Giordano
Party for Social Justice (1)		Beatriz Ávila
Neuquén People's Movement (1)		Alma Sapag

== Election cycles ==
Election	Term	
Election	Start	End
2017	10 December 2017	9 December 2021
2019	10 December 2019	9 December 2023

== List of Deputies ==
The table is sorted by provinces in alphabetical order, and then with their deputies in alphabetical order by their surnames. All deputies start their term on December 10, and end it on December 9 of the corresponding years, except when noted.

Province	Portrait	Deputy	Party	Term start	Term end
Buenos Aires		Juan Aicega	PRO	2017	2021
Buenos Aires		Juan Carlos Alderete	Everybody's Front	2019 (Note: Since 19 December 2020. Replaced Carlos Castagneto after he resigned to become Director of Social Security Resources at AFIP.)	2023
Buenos Aires		María Cristina Álvarez Rodríguez	Everybody's Front	2019	2021 (Note: Resigned on 21 September 2021 to become Minister of Government of Buenos Aires Province.)
Buenos Aires		Pablo Miguel Ansaloni	Federal Unity and Equity	2017	2021
Buenos Aires		Alicia Aparicio	Everybody's Front	2019	2023
Buenos Aires		Alberto Asseff	PRO	2019	2023
Buenos Aires		Karina Banfi	UCR	2019	2023
Buenos Aires		Miguel Ángel Bazze	UCR	2019	2023
Buenos Aires		Hernán Berisso	PRO	2017	2021
Buenos Aires		Claudia Alicia Bernazza	Everybody's Front	2020 (Note: Since 13 May 2020. Replaced Daniel Scioli after he resigned to become Argentina's ambassador to Brazil.)	2021
Buenos Aires		Lisandro Bormioli	Everybody's Front	2020 (Note: Since 13 May 2020. Replaced Andrés Larroque, who resigned to become Minister of Social Development of Buenos Aires Province.)	2023
Buenos Aires		Eduardo Bucca	Everybody's Front	2017	2021
Buenos Aires		Adriana Cáceres	PRO	2020 (Note: Since 27 February 2020. Replaced Guillermo Montenegro, who resigned to become mayor of General Pueyrredón.)	2021
Buenos Aires		Graciela Camaño	Federal Consensus	2019	2023
Buenos Aires		Marcela Campagnoli	Civic Coalition	2017	2021
Buenos Aires		Javier Campos	Civic Coalition	2017	2021
Buenos Aires		Walter Correa	Everybody's Front	2017	2021
Buenos Aires		Camila Crescimbeni	PRO	2019	2023
Buenos Aires		José Ignacio de Mendiguren	Everybody's Front	2017	2021
Buenos Aires		Nicolás del Caño	PTS-Workers' Left Front	2017	2021 (Note: Resigned on 10 June 2021 as per the seat rotation agreement within the Workers' Left Front. His seat was taken by Mónica Schlotthauer.)
Buenos Aires		Romina del Plá	Workers' Left Front	2017	2020 (Note: Resigned on 10 December 2020 as per the seat rotation agreement within the Workers' Left Front. Her seat was taken by Juan Carlos Giordano.)
Buenos Aires		Federico Fagioli	Everybody's Front	2019 (Note: Since 19 December 2019. Replaced Eduardo de Pedro, who became Minister of the Interior.)	2023
Buenos Aires		Héctor Fernández	Everybody's Front	2019 (Note: Since 19 December 2019. Replaced Fernando Espinoza, who resigned to become mayor of La Matanza.)	2021
Buenos Aires		Carlos Alberto Fernández	UCR	2017	2021
Buenos Aires		Ezequiel Fernández Langan	PRO	2017	2021
Buenos Aires		Héctor "Toty" Flores	Civic Coalition	2017	2021
Buenos Aires		Mónica Edith Frade	Civic Coalition	2019	2023
Buenos Aires		Sebastián García De Luca	PRO	2019	2023
Buenos Aires		Juan Carlos Giordano	Socialist Left–Workers' Left Front	2020 (Note: Since 10 December 2020. Replaced Romina del Plá, who resigned her seat.)	2021
Buenos Aires		Leonardo Grosso	Everybody's Front	2019	2023
Buenos Aires		Ramiro Gutiérrez	Everybody's Front	2019	2023
Buenos Aires		María de las Mercedes Joury	PRO	2019	2023
Buenos Aires		Máximo Carlos Kirchner	Everybody's Front	2019	2023
Buenos Aires		Marcelo Koenig	Everybody's Front	2019 (Note: Since 19 December 2019. Replaced Horacio Pietragalla, who resigned to become Secretary of Human Rights.)	2021
Buenos Aires		Florencia Lampreabe	Everybody's Front	2019	2023
Buenos Aires		Andrés Larroque	Everybody's Front	2019	2020 (Note: Resigned on 1 May 2020 to become Minister of Social Development of Buenos Aires Province. His seat was taken by Lisandro Bormioli.)
Buenos Aires		María Jimena López	Everybody's Front	2019 (Note: Since 19 December 2019. Replaced Luana Volnovich, who resigned to become Executive Director of PAMI.)	2023
Buenos Aires		Silvia Gabriela Lospennato	PRO	2019	2023
Buenos Aires		Mónica Macha	Everybody's Front	2017	2021
Buenos Aires		María Rosa Martínez	Everybody's Front	2019	2023
Buenos Aires		Sergio Tomás Massa	Everybody's Front	2019	2023
Buenos Aires		Martín Nicolás Medina	PRO	2017	2021
Buenos Aires		Josefina Mendoza	UCR	2017	2021
Buenos Aires		Cecilia Moreau	Everybody's Front	2019	2023
Buenos Aires		Leopoldo Raúl Guido Moreau	Everybody's Front	2017	2021
Buenos Aires		Juan Facundo Moyano	Everybody's Front	2019	2021 (Note: Resigned on 12 August 2021.)
Buenos Aires		María Graciela Ocaña	PRO	2017	2021
Buenos Aires		Claudia Beatriz Ormachea	Everybody's Front	2019	2023
Buenos Aires		Carlos Ortega	Everybody's Front	2021 (Note: Since 11 February 2021. Replaced Magdalena Sierra.)	2021
Buenos Aires		María Carla Piccolomini	PRO	2017	2021
Buenos Aires		Fabio José Quetglas	UCR	2017	2021
Buenos Aires		María Luján Rey	PRO	2019	2023
Buenos Aires		Cristian Adrián Ritondo	PRO	2019	2023
Buenos Aires		Alejandro "Topo" Rodríguez	Federal Consensus	2019	2023
Buenos Aires		Nicolás Rodríguez Saá	Everybody's Front	2019 (Note: Since 19 December 2019. Replaced Laura Valeria Alonso, who resigned to become Secretary of Social Inclusivity.)	2021
Buenos Aires		Laura Russo	Everybody's Front	2017	2021
Buenos Aires		Sebastián Nicolás Salvador	UCR	2019	2023
Buenos Aires		Jorge Sarghini	Federal Consensus	2019 (Note: Since 19 December 2019. Replaced Daniel Arroyo, who became Minister of Social Development.)	2021
Buenos Aires		Mónica Leticia Schlotthauer	Socialist Left–Workers' Left Front	2021 (Note: Since 10 June 2021. Replaced Nicolás del Caño, who resigned his seat.)	2021
Buenos Aires		María Liliana Schwindt	Everybody's Front	2020 (Note: Since 12 February 2020. Replaced Felipe Solá, who became Minister of Foreign Affairs.)	2021
Buenos Aires		Carlos Américo Selva	Everybody's Front	2019	2023
Buenos Aires		Magdalena Sierra	Everybody's Front	2017	2021 (Note: Resigned on 11 February 2021 to become cabinet chief of Avellaneda Partido. Replaced by Carlos Ortega.)
Buenos Aires		Vanesa Raquel Siley	Everybody's Front	2017	2021
Buenos Aires		Natalia Marcela Souto	Everybody's Front	2021 (Note: Since 26 October 2021. Replaced Cristina Álvarez Rodríguez after her resignation.)	2023
Buenos Aires		Mariana Stilman	Civic Coalition	2019	2023
Buenos Aires		Luis Rodolfo Tailhade	Everybody's Front	2019	2023
Buenos Aires		Pablo Torello	PRO	2019	2023
Buenos Aires		Mirta Tundis	Everybody's Front	2017	2021
Buenos Aires		Romina Uhrig	Everybody's Front	2019 (Note: Since 19 December 2019. Replaced Roberto Salvarezza, who became Minister of Science, Technology and Innovation.)	2021
Buenos Aires		Fernanda Vallejos	Everybody's Front	2017	2021
Buenos Aires		Daniela Marina Vilar	Everybody's Front	2019	2023
Buenos Aires		Natalia Soledad Villa	PRO	2017	2021
Buenos Aires		Waldo Ezequiel Wolff	PRO	2019	2023
Buenos Aires		Liliana Patricia Yambrún	Everybody's Front	2019	2023
Buenos Aires		Lucio Yapor	Everybody's Front	2021 (Note: Since 26 October 2021. Replaced Facundo Moyano after his resignation.)	2023
Buenos Aires		Hugo Yasky	Everybody's Front	2017	2021
Buenos Aires City		Mara Brawer	Everybody's Front	2019 (Note: Since 19 December 2019. Replaced Victoria Donda, who became Director of the National Institute Against Discrimination, Xenophobia and Racism.)	2023
Buenos Aires City		Ana Carla Carrizo	UCR	2017	2021
Buenos Aires City		Elisa María Avelina "Lilita" Carrió	Civic Coalition	2017	2020 (Note: Resigned on 1 March 2020. Her seat was taken by José Luis Patiño.)
Buenos Aires City		Gabriela Cerruti	Everybody's Front	2017	2021 (Note: Resigned on 13 October 2021 to become the official spokeswoman of the Presidency.)
Buenos Aires City		Álvaro Héctor de Lamadrid	UCR	2019 (Note: Since 19 December 2019. Replaced Martín Lousteau, who resigned to become a National Senator.)	2021
Buenos Aires City		Jorge Ricardo Enríquez	PRO	2017	2021
Buenos Aires City		Maximiliano Carlos Francisco Ferraro	Civic Coalition	2019	2023
Buenos Aires City		Alejandro García	PRO	2017	2021
Buenos Aires City		Álvaro Gustavo González	PRO	2019	2023
Buenos Aires City		Itai Hagman	Everybody's Front	2019	2023
Buenos Aires City		Carlos Salomón Heller	Everybody's Front	2019 (Note: Since 19 December 2019. Replaced Juan Cabandié, who became Minister of the Environment and Sustainable Development.)	2021
Buenos Aires City		Fernando Adolfo Iglesias	PRO	2017	2021
Buenos Aires City		Gustavo Fernando López	Everybody's Front	2021 (Note: Since 26 October 2021. Replaced Gabriela Cerruti after her resignation.)	2021
Buenos Aires City		Juan Manuel López	Civic Coalition	2017	2021
Buenos Aires City		María Dolores Martínez	UCR	2019	2023
Buenos Aires City		Gisela Marziotta	Everybody's Front	2020 (Note: Since 29 January 2020. Replaced Daniel Filmus, who became a Secretary of the Malvinas, Antarctica and the South Atlantic Islands.)	2021
Buenos Aires City		Victoria Morales Gorleri	PRO	2019	2023
Buenos Aires City		Paula Mariana Oliveto Lago	Civic Coalition	2017	2021
Buenos Aires City		José Luis Patiño	PRO	2020 (Note: Since 13 May 2020. Replaced Elisa Carrió, who resigned her seat.)	2021
Buenos Aires City		Paula Andrea Penacca	Everybody's Front	2019	2023
Buenos Aires City		Carmen Polledo	PRO	2017	2021
Buenos Aires City		Dina Esther Rezinovsky	PRO	2019	2023
Buenos Aires City		Facundo Suárez Lastra	UCR	2017	2021
Buenos Aires City		Pablo Gabriel Tonelli	PRO	2019	2023
Buenos Aires City		Eduardo Félix Valdés	Everybody's Front	2019	2023
Buenos Aires City		Emiliano Benjamín Yacobitti	UCR	2019	2023
Buenos Aires City		Mariana de Jesús Zuvic	Civic Coalition	2019	2023
Catamarca		Eduardo Segundo Brizuela del Moral	Civic and Social Front of Catamarca	2017	2021 (Note: Died on 25 August 2021.)
Catamarca		Lucía Benigna Corpacci	Everybody's Front	2019	2023
Catamarca		Silvana Micaela Ginocchio	Everybody's Front	2017	2021
Catamarca		Dante Edgardo López Rodríguez	Everybody's Front	2019 (Note: Since 19 December 2019. Replaced Gustavo Saadi, who became mayor of San Fernando del Valle de Catamarca.)	2021
Catamarca		Rubén Manzi	Civic Coalition	2019	2023
Catamarca		Julieta Marcolli	Civic and Social Front of Catamarca	2021 (Note: Since 26 October 2021. Replaced Gabriela Cerruti after her resignation.)	2021
Chaco		Aída Beatriz Máxima Ayala	UCR	2017	2021
Chaco		Gerardo Cipolini	UCR	2019	2023
Chaco		Aldo Adolfo Leiva	Everybody's Front	2019	2023
Chaco		María Lucila Masin	Everybody's Front	2019	2023
Chaco		Juan Mosqueda	Everybody's Front	2017	2021
Chaco		Elda Pértile	Everybody's Front	2017	2021
Chaco		Alicia Terada	Civic Coalition	2017	2021
Chubut		Estela Beatriz Hernández	Everybody's Front	2019	2023
Chubut		Santiago Nicolás Igon	Everybody's Front	2019	2023
Chubut		Gustavo Menna	UCR	2017	2021
Chubut		Rosa Rosario Muñoz	Everybody's Front	2017	2021
Chubut		Ignacio Agustín Torres	PRO	2019	2023
Córdoba		Brenda Lis Austin	UCR	2017	2021
Córdoba		Héctor Baldassi	PRO	2017	2021
Córdoba		María Soledad Carrizo	UCR	2017	2021
Córdoba		Pablo Carro	Everybody's Front	2017	2021
Córdoba		Paulo Leonardo Cassinerio	Federal Córdoba	2017	2021
Córdoba		Soher El Sukaria	PRO	2019	2023
Córdoba		Gabriela Beatriz Estévez	Everybody's Front	2019	2023
Córdoba		Eduardo Gabriel Fernández	Everybody's Front	2019	2023
Córdoba		Gabriel Alberto Frizza	PRO	2017	2021
Córdoba		Carlos Mario Gutiérrez	Federal Córdoba	2019	2023
Córdoba		Luis Alfredo Juez	PRO	2019	2023
Córdoba		Claudia Márquez	Federal Córdoba	2019 (Note: Since 19 December 2019. Replaced Martín Llaryora, who became mayor of Córdoba.)	2021
Córdoba		Leonor María Martínez Villada	Civic Coalition	2019	2023
Córdoba		Diego Matías Mestre	UCR	2017	2021
Córdoba		Mario Raúl Negri	UCR	2019	2023
Córdoba		Víctor Hugo Romero	UCR	2019	2023
Córdoba		Adriana Noemí Ruarte	PRO	2019	2023
Córdoba		Alejandra María Vigo	Federal Córdoba	2017	2021
Corrientes		Sofía Brambilla	PRO	2017	2021
Corrientes		Ingrid Jetter	PRO	2019	2023
Corrientes		Estela Mercedes Regidor Belledone	UCR	2017	2021
Corrientes		Jorge Antonio Romero	Everybody's Front	2017	2021
Corrientes		José Arnaldo Ruiz Aragón	Everybody's Front	2019	2023
Corrientes		Nancy Sand	Everybody's Front	2019	2023
Corrientes		Jorge Vara	UCR	2019	2023
Entre Ríos		Atilio Francisco Salvador Benedetti	UCR	2017	2021
Entre Ríos		Marcelo Pablo Casaretto	Everybody's Front	2019	2023
Entre Ríos		Mayda Cresto	Everybody's Front	2017	2021
Entre Ríos		Alicia Fregonese	PRO	2017	2021
Entre Ríos		Ana Carolina Gaillard	Everybody's Front	2019 (Note: Since 19 December 2019. Replaced Juan José Bahillo, who became Minister of Production, Tourism and Economic Development of Entre Ríos Province.)	2021
Entre Ríos		Gustavo René Hein	PRO	2019	2023
Entre Ríos		Jorge Enrique Lacoste	UCR	2017	2021
Entre Ríos		Gabriela Mabel Lena	UCR	2019	2023
Entre Ríos		Blanca Inés Osuna	Everybody's Front	2019	2023
Formosa		Mario Horacio Arce	UCR	2017	2021
Formosa		Ricardo Buryaile	UCR	2019	2023
Formosa		Nelly Ramona Daldovo	Everybody's Front	2019 (Note: Since 19 December 2019. Replaced Luis Basterra, who never took his seat and instead became Minister of Agriculture.)	2023
Formosa		Gustavo Ramiro Fernández Patri	Everybody's Front	2017	2021
Formosa		María Graciela Parola	Everybody's Front	2019	2023
Jujuy		María Gabriela Burgos	UCR	2017	2021
Jujuy		Julio Daniel Ferreyra	Everybody's Front	2019	2023
Jujuy		José Luis Martiarena	Everybody's Front	2017	2021
Jujuy		María Carolina Moisés	Everybody's Front	2019	2023
Jujuy		Osmar Antonio Monaldi	PRO	2017	2021
Jujuy		Jorge Raúl Rizzotti	UCR	2019	2023
La Pampa		Martín Antonio Berhongaray	UCR	2019	2023
La Pampa		Melina Aida Delú	Everybody's Front	2017	2021
La Pampa		Martín Maquieyra	PRO	2017	2021
La Pampa		Hernán Pérez Araujo	Everybody's Front	2019	2023
La Pampa		Ariel Rauschenberger	Everybody's Front	2017	2021
La Rioja		Hilda Clelia Aguirre de Soria	Everybody's Front	2019	2023
La Rioja		Diego Felipe Álvarez	Federal Action	2019	2023
La Rioja		Sergio Guillermo Casas	Everybody's Front	2019	2023
La Rioja		Danilo Adrián Flores	Everybody's Front	2017	2021
La Rioja		Julio Enrique Sahad	PRO	2017	2021
Mendoza		Alejandro Daniel Bermejo	Everybody's Front	2019	2021 (Note: Resigned on 3 March 2021. Replaced by Eber Pérez Plaza.)
Mendoza		Alfredo Víctor Cornejo Neila	UCR	2019	2023
Mendoza		Omar Bruno De Marchi	PRO	2019	2023
Mendoza		Omar Chafí Félix	Everybody's Front	2017	2021
Mendoza		Jimena Hebe Latorre	UCR	2019	2023
Mendoza		Claudia Najul	UCR	2017	2021
Mendoza		Eber Albano Pérez Plaza	Everybody's Front	2021 (Note: Since 27 March 2021. Replaced Alejandro Bermejo.)	2023
Mendoza		Luis Alfonso Petri	UCR	2017	2021
Mendoza		José Luis Ramón	Federal Unity and Equity	2017	2021
Mendoza		Marisa Lourdes Uceda	Everybody's Front	2019	2023
Mendoza		Federico Raúl Zamarbide	UCR	2017	2021
Misiones		Héctor Orlando Bárbaro	Everybody's Front	2019	2023
Misiones		María Cristina Britez	Everybody's Front	2019	2023
Misiones		Flavia Morales	Misiones Front for Concord	2017	2021
Misiones		Luis Mario Pastori	UCR	2017	2021
Misiones		Diego Horacio Sartori	Misiones Front for Concord	2019	2023
Misiones		Alfredo Oscar Schiavoni	PRO	2017	2021
Misiones		Ricardo Wellbach	Misiones Front for Concord	2017	2021
Neuquén		Guillermo Oscar Carnaghi	Everybody's Front	2020 (Note: Since 24 September 2020. Replaced Darío Martínez, who resigned to become Secretary of Energy.)	2023
Neuquén		Norman Darío Martínez	Everybody's Front	2019	2020 (Note: Resigned on 28 August 2020. His seat was taken by Guillermo Carnaghi.)
Neuquén		Francisco Sánchez	PRO	2019	2023
Neuquén		Alma Liliana "Chani" Sapag	Neuquén People's Movement	2017	2021
Neuquén		David Pablo Schlereth	PRO	2017	2021
Neuquén		Carlos Alberto Vivero	Everybody's Front	2019 (Note: Since 19 December 2019. Replaced Darío Martínez, who resigned from his 2017–2021 mandate to assume a new 2019–2023 mandate upon his re-election in 2019.)	2021
Río Negro		Pedro Cristian Dantas	Everybody's Front	2021 (Note: Since 27 March 2021. Replaced Martín Soria, who resigned to become Minister of Justice and Human Right.)	2023
Río Negro		Luis Di Giacomo	Together We Are Río Negro	2019	2023
Río Negro		Susana Graciela Landriscini	Everybody's Front	2019	2023
Río Negro		Lorena Matzen	UCR	2017	2021
Río Negro		Martín Horacio Soria	Everybody's Front	2019	2021 (Note: Resigned on 27 March 2021 to become Minister of Justice and Human Right. His seat was taken by Pedro Dantas.)
Río Negro		Ayelén Spósito	Everybody's Front	2019 (Note: Since 19 December 2019. Replaced María Emilia Soria, who became mayor of General Roca, Río Negro.)	2021
Salta		Juan Emilio Ameri	Everybody's Front	2019 (Note: From 19 December 2019. Replaced Sergio Leavy, who resigned to become a National Senator.)	2020 (Note: Resigned on 25 September 2020. His seat was taken by Alcira Figueroa.)
Salta		Lía Verónica Caliva	Everybody's Front	2019	2023
Salta		Virginia María Cornejo	PRO	2019	2023
Salta		Alcira Elsa Figueroa	Everybody's Front	2020 (Note: Since 7 October 2020. Replaced Juan Emilio Ameri.)	2021
Salta		Lucas Javier Godoy	Everybody's Front	2019	2023
Salta		Martín Federico Grande Durand	PRO	2017	2021
Salta		Miguel Nanni Valero	UCR	2019	2023
Salta		Miguel Andrés Costas Zottos	Justicialist	2017	2021
San Juan		Walberto Enrique Allende	Everybody's Front	2017	2021
San Juan		Eduardo Augusto Cáceres	PRO	2017	2021
San Juan		Graciela María Caselles	Everybody's Front	2019	2023
San Juan		José Luis Gioja	Everybody's Front	2019	2023
San Juan		Alejandro Francisco Guevara Olivera	Everybody's Front	2019 (Note: Since 19 December 2019. Replaced Daniela Castro, who became Secretary of Science and Technology in the Ministry of Defense.)	2021
San Juan		Humberto Marcelo Orrego	Production and Labour	2019	2023
San Luis		Karim Augusto Alume Sbodio	Everybody's Front	2017	2021
San Luis		Alejandro Cacace	UCR	2019	2023
San Luis		Carlos Ybrhain Ponce	Everybody's Front	2019	2023
San Luis		José Luis Riccardo	UCR	2017	2021
San Luis		Victoria Rosso	Everybody's Front	2017	2021
Santa Cruz		Antonio José Carambia	Federal Action	2017	2021
Santa Cruz		Pablo Gerardo González	Everybody's Front	2019	2021 (Note: Resigned on 19 January 2021 to become president of YPF. Replaced by Jorge Verón.)
Santa Cruz		Roxana Nahir Reyes	UCR	2017	2021
Santa Cruz		Juan Benedicto Vázquez	Everybody's Front	2017 (Note: Since 18 December 2017.)	2021
Santa Cruz		Jorge Guillermo Verón	Everybody's Front	2021 (Note: Since 2 February 2021. Replaced Pablo Gerardo González.)	2023
Santa Cruz		Marcela Paola Vessvessian	Everybody's Front	2019	2023
Santa Fe		Federico Angelini	PRO	2019	2023
Santa Fe		Esteban Mateo Bogdanich	Everybody's Front	2019 (Note: Since 19 December 2019. Replaced Agustín Rossi, who became Minister of Defense.)	2021
Santa Fe		Albor Ángel "Nicky" Cantard	UCR	2017	2021
Santa Fe		Laura Carolina Castets	Civic Coalition	2019	2023
Santa Fe		Marcos Cleri	Everybody's Front	2019	2023
Santa Fe		Luis Gustavo Contigiani	Progressive, Civic and Social Front	2017	2021
Santa Fe		Gonzalo Pedro Antonio del Cerro	UCR	2017	2021
Santa Fe		Enrique Eloy Estévez	Socialist	2019	2023
Santa Fe		Ximena García	UCR	2019	2023
Santa Fe		Josefina Victoria Tosetto González	Everybody's Front	2017	2021
Santa Fe		Luciano Andrés Laspina	PRO	2017	2021
Santa Fe		María Lucila Lehmann	Civic Coalition	2017	2021
Santa Fe		Juan Martín	UCR	2019	2023
Santa Fe		Germán Pedro Martínez	Everybody's Front	2019	2023
Santa Fe		Vanesa Laura Massetani	Everybody's Front	2019	2023
Santa Fe		Patricia Mónica Mounier	Everybody's Front	2019 (Note: Since 19 December 2019. Replaced Alejandra Rodenas, who became Vice Governor of Santa Fe Province.)	2021
Santa Fe		José Carlos Núñez	PRO	2019	2023
Santa Fe		Alejandra del Huerto Obeid	Everybody's Front	2019	2023
Santa Fe		Gisela Scaglia	PRO	2017	2021
Santiago del Estero		Norma Amanda Abdala de Matarazzo	Everybody's Front	2017	2021
Santiago del Estero		Daniel Agustín Brue	Everybody's Front	2019	2023
Santiago del Estero		Ricardo Daniel Daives	Everybody's Front	2019	2023
Santiago del Estero		Bernardo José "Pepe" Herrera	Everybody's Front	2019 (Note: Since 4 April 2019. Replaced Hugo Orlando Infante, who died on 30 December 2018.)	2021
Santiago del Estero		María Luisa Montoto de Rogel	Everybody's Front	2019 (Note: Since 19 December 2019. Replaced Claudia Ledesma Abdala, who resigned to become a National Senator.)	2021
Santiago del Estero		Graciela Navarro	Everybody's Front	2019	2023
Santiago del Estero		Estela Mary Neder	Everybody's Front	2019	2023
Tierra del Fuego		Rosana Andrea Bertone	Everybody's Front	2019	2023
Tierra del Fuego		Mabel Luisa Caparrós	Everybody's Front	2019	2023
Tierra del Fuego		Federico Frigerio	PRO	2019	2023
Tierra del Fuego		Héctor Antonio Stefani	PRO	2017	2021
Tierra del Fuego		Inés Carolina Yutrovic	Everybody's Front	2019 (Note: Since 19 December 2019. Replaced Martín Alejandro Pérez, who became mayor of Río Grande, Tierra del Fuego.)	2021
Tucumán		Domingo Luis Amaya	PRO	2019	2023
Tucumán		Lidia Inés Ascárate	UCR	2019	2023
Tucumán		Beatriz Luisa Ávila	Party for Social Justice	2017	2021
Tucumán		José Manuel Cano	UCR	2017	2021
Tucumán		Nilda Mabel Carrizo	Everybody's Front	2019	2023
Tucumán		Carlos Aníbal Cisneros	Everybody's Front	2019	2023
Tucumán		Mario Alberto Leito	Everybody's Front	2019	2023
Tucumán		Gladys Medina	Everybody's Front	2017	2021
Tucumán		Pablo Raúl Yedlin	Everybody's Front	2017	2021
