= Germana =

Germana is an Italian female name. Notable people with the name include:

- Germana Caroli (1931–2024), Italian singer
- Germana Di Natale (born 1974), Italian tennis player
- Germana Dominici (1946–2024), Italian actress and film director
- Germana Figueroa Casas (born 1967), Argentine politician
- Germana Malabarba (1913–2002), Italian gymnast
- Germana Marucelli (1905–1983), Italian fashion designer
- Germana Paolieri (1906–1998), Italian actress
- Germana Quintana (born 1940), Venezuelan director
- Germana Rocha (born 1968), Portuguese politician
- Germana Sperotto (born 1964), Italian cross-country skier
- Germana Viana (born 1972), Brazilian comic book artist and writer
- Saint Germaine Cousin (1579–1601), French saint.
- Saint Grimonia, 4th-century Irish martyr
