= Laura Rodríguez Machado =

Argentine politician (born 1965)

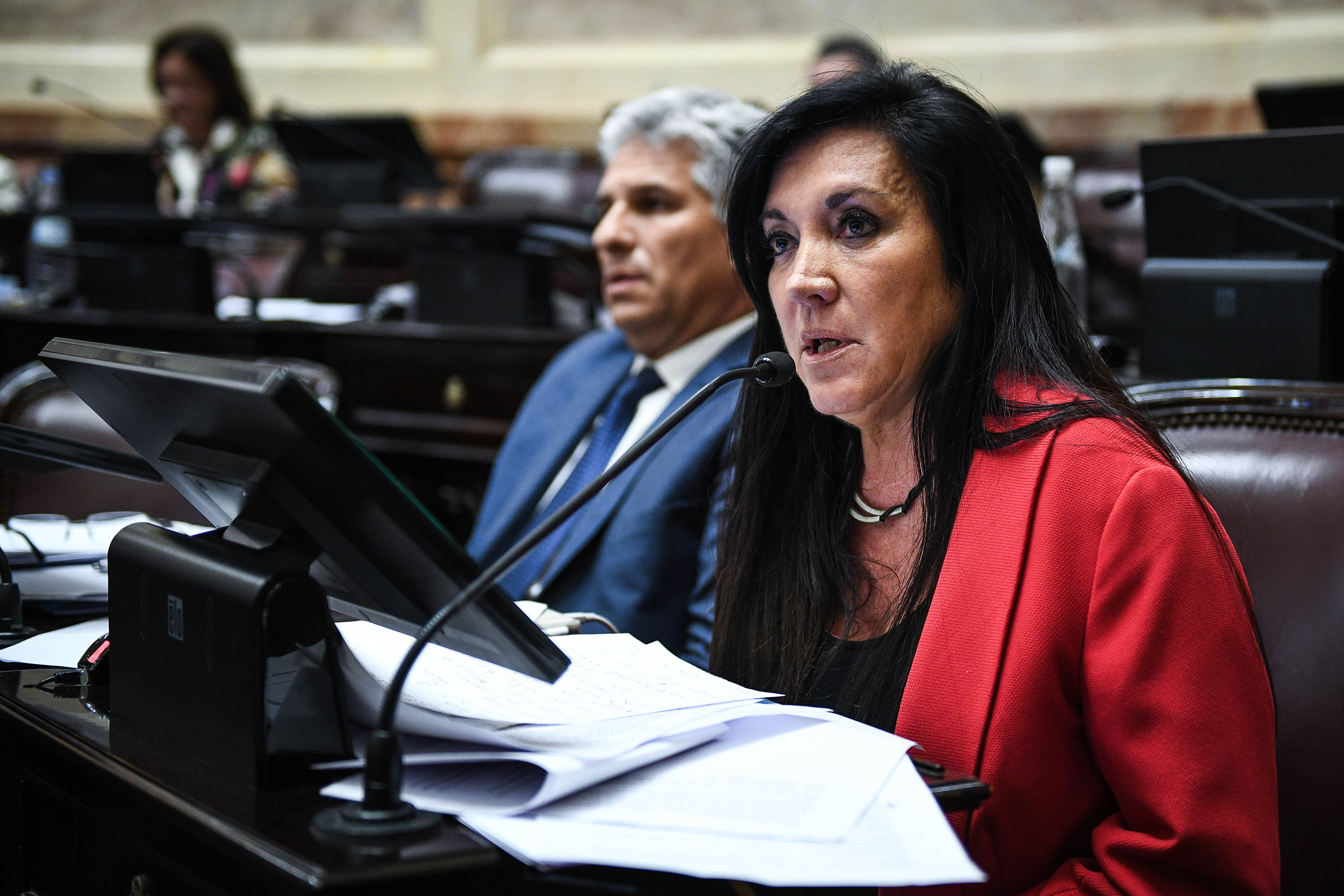

National Deputy
- Incumbent
- Assumed office 10 December 2021
- Constituency: Córdoba

National Senator
- In office 10 December 2015 – 10 December 2021
- Constituency: Córdoba

Provincial Legislator of Córdoba
- In office 10 December 1991 – 10 December 1999

Personal details
- Born: 9 April 1965 (age 61) Córdoba, Argentina
- Party: UCEDE (until 1998); Liberal Democratic Party (1998–2013); Republican Proposal (since 2013)
- Other political affiliations: Action for the Republic (1998); Juntos por el Cambio (since 2015)
- Education: National University of Córdoba

Laura Elena Rodríguez Machado (born 9 April 1965) is an Argentine politician who has been a National Deputy elected in Córdoba Province since 2021, and served as a National Senator for Córdoba from 2015 to 2021. A member of Republican Proposal (PRO), Rodríguez Machado previously served as a provincial legislator of Córdoba from 1991 to 1995 for the Union of the Democratic Centre (UCEDE). In the National Congress, she sits in the Juntos por el Cambio parliamentary inter-bloc. She is also the second vice president of PRO.

Laura Rodríguez Machado is running in the fourth position on La Libertad Avanza’s list to renew her seat as National Deputy for Córdoba in the 2025 congress elections.

== Early life and education ==
Rodríguez Machado was born on 9 April 1965 in Córdoba, Argentina. She has a law degree from the National University of Córdoba, where she specialized in labour law. She worked as an editor secretary at Contribuciones magazine, published by Konrad Adenauer Foundation.

== Political career ==
In 1991, she was elected to the Legislature of Córdoba as part of the Union of the Democratic Centre (UCEDE). She was re-elected to a second term in 1995. In 1998, following disagreements with party leader Germán Kammerath, Rodríguez Machado joined a group of UCEDE politicians in breaking away and forming the Liberal Democratic Party.

In 1998, she was the running mate of Guillermo Johnson for the governorship of Córdoba, in alliance with the Action for the Republic party. The Johnson–Rodríguez Machado ticket won 4.80% of the vote, placing in third place and trailing far behind the PJ and UCR candidates. Following Kammerath's victory in the Córdoba city elections in 1999, Rodríguez Machado was appointed secretary of economic development of the city, a position she held until 2003.

In the 2013 legislative election, Rodríguez Machado was the second candidate to the Chamber of Deputies in the Republican Proposal (PRO) list, behind Héctor Baldassi. The PRO list received 14.41% of the votes, enough for Baldassi to be elected, but not Rodríguez Machado.

=== Congresswoman ===
In the 2015 general election, Rodríguez Machado ran for one of Córdoba's three seats in the Senate as the first candidate in the Cambiemos list, alongside Ernesto Félix Martínez. The Cambiemos list was the most voted in the province, with 50.23% of the vote, granting both Rodríguez Machado and Martínez the seats for the majority as per the Senate's limited voting system.

As senator, Rodríguez Machado formed part of the parliamentary commissions on Tourism, Labour and Social Prevision, Population and Human Development, National Economy and Investment, Women's Affairs, and Constitutional Affairs (in which she serves as vice-president). She was a supporter of the legalization of abortion in Argentina, voting in favour the two Voluntary Interruption of Pregnancy bill debated by the Argentine Congress in 2018 and 2020. On 10 December 2019, she was elected second vice president of the Senate, deputising Claudia Ledesma Abdala alongside Maurice Closs and Martín Lousteau.

In the 2021 legislative election, Rodríguez Machado was the fourth candidate to the Chamber of Deputies in Córdoba in the Juntos por el Cambio list, behind Rodrigo de Loredo, Soledad Carrizo, and Héctor Baldassi. With 54.06% of the vote, the Juntos por el Cambio list received enough votes for all four of them (plus two more candidates) to be elected.
