= Galimberti =

Galimberti is an Italian surname. Notable people with the surname include:

- Carlo Galimberti (1894–1939), Argentine-Italian weightlifter
- Giorgio Galimberti (born 1976), Italian tennis player
- Jacopo Galimberti (born 1993), Italian footballer
- José Galimberti (1896–19??), Brazilian athlete
- Luigi Galimberti (1836–1896), Italian cardinal
- Orietta Galimberti, best known as Orietta Berti (born 1943), Italian pop-folk singer, actress and television personality
- Pablo Galimberti (born 1941), Uruguayan Roman Catholic bishop
- Paolo Galimberti (born 1968), Italian politician and entrepreneur
- Pedro Galimberti (born 1970), Argentine politician
