= Ricardo Wellbach =

Argentine politician

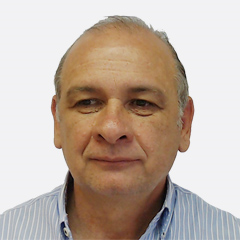

National Deputy
- In office 10 December 2017 – 10 December 2021
- Constituency: Misiones

Provincial Deputy of Misiones
- In office 10 December 2007 – 10 December 2011

Personal details
- Born: 15 February 1962 (age 64) Veinticinco de Mayo, Misiones Province, Argentina
- Party: Front for the Renewal of Concord
- Education: Instituto Saavedra

Ricardo Wellbach (born 15 February 1962) is an Argentine politician who was a National Deputy elected in Misiones Province from 2017 to 2021. A member of the regionalist Front for the Renewal of Concord (FRC), Wellbach previously served as a member of the Chamber of Representatives of Misiones from 2007 to 2011. During the 2019–2021 congressional term, Wellbach was president of the FRC parliamentary bloc in the Chamber of Deputies.

Wellbach was born in Veinticinco de Mayo, a city in South-Central Misiones Province. He studied political science at the Instituto Hernando Arias de Saavedra in Posadas, graduating with a higher technical degree in 2002. Wellbach is married to Juana Beatriz Skeppstedt and has two children.

Wellbach ran for a seat in the lower house of the National Congress in the 2017 legislative election, as the first candidate in the FRC list. The FRC was the most voted alliance in the province, with 42.69% of the vote, and Wellbach was elected alongside the list's second candidate, Flavia Morales.

As a national deputy, Wellbach formed part of the parliamentary commissions on Internal Security, Finances, Communications, and Tourism. He was an opponent of the legalization of abortion in Argentina, voting against the two Voluntary Interruption of Pregnancy bills, which passed the Chamber in 2018 and 2020.
