= Jimena Hebe Latorre =

Argentine politician

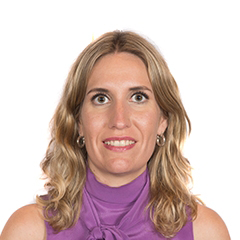

National Deputy
- In office 10 December 2019 – 10 December 2023
- Constituency: Mendoza Province

Personal details
- Born: August 6, 1986 (age 39)
- Party: Radical Civic Union

Jimena Hebe Latorre (born August 6, 1986) is an Argentine politician who was a member of the Argentine Chamber of Deputies from 2019 to 2023.

== Personal life ==
After her cancer diagnosis she received a standing ovation in congress.

== See also ==
- List of Argentine deputies, 2019–2021
- List of Argentine deputies, 2021–2023
