= María Luján Rey =

Argentine politician

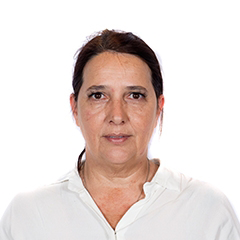

Member of the Argentine Chamber of Deputies
- In office 10 December 2019 – 10 December 2023
- Constituency: Buenos Aires Province

Personal details
- Born: 4 August 1969 (age 56)
- Party: Radical Civic Union

María Luján Rey (born 4 August 1969) is an Argentine politician who was a member of the Argentine Chamber of Deputies from 2019 to 2023.

== See also ==
- List of Argentine deputies, 2019–2021
- List of Argentine deputies, 2021–2023
