= Laura Castets =

Argentine politician

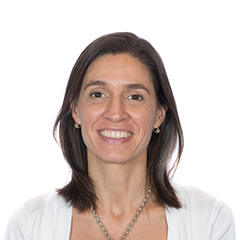

Member of the Argentine Chamber of Deputies
- In office 10 December 2019 – 10 December 2023
- Constituency: Santa Fe Province

Personal details
- Party: Civic Coalition ARI

Laura Carolina Castets is an Argentine politician who was a member of the Argentine Chamber of Deputies from 2019 to 2023.

In 2023, she left the Civic Coalition due to differences with Elisa Carrió.

== See also ==
- List of Argentine deputies, 2019–2021
- List of Argentine deputies, 2021–2023
