= Piquetero Party =

Political Party in Argentina

Partido Piquetero
- President: Juan Marino
- Founded: 2018
- Headquarters: Buenos Aires
- Ideology: Communism; Trotskyism; Kirchnerism; Socialism
- Political position: Far-left
- National affiliation: Homeland Force
- Chamber of Deputies: 1 / 257 (as part of Homeland Force)

The Piquetero Party is a Trotskyist political party of Argentina founded in 2018. Currently, it is one of the parties that make up the Homeland Force coalition.

== History ==
The term piquetero is a term from Argentine Spanish that refers to protesters who block streets to demonstrate for a particular issue. The concept of a piquetero has existed since at least the mid-1990s.

=== Foundation ===
The Piquetero Party was established in 2018 by Juan Marino, who had been a member of the Workers' Party. After his expulsion from the Workers' Party in 2009, he founded the Revolutionary Piquetera Tendency (TPR) in 2010. The TPR became the basis for the creation of the Piquetero Party in 2018.

=== Development ===
Since its creation, the Piquetero Party has actively participated in social mobilizations and has been part of various electoral coalitions. In 2017, it was part of the Popular Meeting for Land, Roof and Work.

In 2019, the party joined the Frente de Todos, and although it did not win seats in that election, its leader Juan Marino assumed a position in the Argentine Chamber of Deputies in 2022, replacing Sergio Massa.

== Ideology ==
The Piquetero Party describes itself as an advocate of social inclusion and economic justice, with proposals aimed at changes in existing economic structures. A key proposal is the implementation of a universal basic wage to address immediate economic inequalities. In line with this, the party has been described as far-left, Kirchnerist, communist, and Trotskyist, and openly supports Kirchnerism, while describes itself as the champion of the "piquetero struggle." It supports Peronism and evokes Eva Perón as one of its main ideological inspirations, situating itself as the "left of Kirchnerism" and maintaining political ties with Kirchnerist figures such as Luis D'Elía and Gabriel Mariotto. However, his ideology also raises a profound criticism of the current economic system, based on a Marxist analysis of the dynamics of modern capitalism.

According to the document "The Collapse of Capital", the party considers that the current historical phase is dominated by imperialist monopolies, which have "eradicated free markets, the core of traditional capitalism." This analysis highlights the antagonism between "parasitic monopolies and financial capitalism versus industrial production and merchant capitalism." This contradiction fuels important class struggles and international conflicts.

The Piquetero Party maintains that the fight against fascism is intrinsically linked to the fight against monopolies, arguing that the expropriation of these is a necessity to advance towards social and economic justice. This perspective seeks to guide the working class towards a planned or communist economy, positioning this expropriation as a crucial task.

=== International Position ===
Beyond the national sphere, the Piquetero Party has positioned itself in Latin American debates. In 2018, following the electoral victory of Jair Bolsonaro in Brazil, it issued a communiqué describing the result as the triumph of “fascism” and called for the formation of a continental anti-fascist front. The party highlighted that “the only path against Bolsonaro is the anti-fascist front,” stressing unity among workers, students, and social movements across the region. In foreign policy, the Piquetero Party is known for its defense of the chavista government of Venezuela and its alliance with the Russian Federation, a stance that situates its regional positions within a broader geopolitical alignment.

The Piquetero Party expressed solidarity with Brazilian organizations such as the Partido da Causa Operária (PCO), which it described as a “sister party” in the fight against fascism. It also supported the creation of self-defense committees within mass organizations as a way to resist authoritarian advances. While maintaining criticism of moderate currents like Lula da Silva and Fernando Haddad, the party nonetheless called to vote for the Workers’ Party candidate in the 2018 Brazilian elections as part of a united front against Bolsonaro. The party’s international orientation has also been reflected in its leaders’ statements: Juan Marino has praised Nicolás Maduro and the Russian aid to Venezuela, and decried other countries' offeres of aid to Venezuela as "a covert plan for a US-led intervention".

Additionally, Juan Marino and the party signed a national Argentine solidarity committee demanding fair electoral conditions for Lula in Brazil, rejecting what they considered a judicialized ousting of democratic rights.

In July 2025, the Piquetero Party organized a demonstration in front of the U.S. Embassy in Argentina to reject the war against Iran. At the event, Juan Marino gave a speech (transcribed by the party itself) in which he expressed solidarity with international protests and questioned U.S. military intervention.

== Electoral history ==
In 2017, the Piquetero Party participated in the legislative elections as part of the Popular Encounter for Land, Roof and Work coalition. However, it failed to obtain representation.

In 2019, the party joined the Frente de Todos and Juan Marino was included in the list of candidates, although he was not initially elected. Marino assumed a seat in the Chamber of Deputies in 2022 after the resignation of Sergio Massa.

In 2023, the Piquetero Party was part of the Union for the Homeland coalition and Juan Marino managed to obtain a seat in the Chamber of Deputies, occupying the 15th place on the list.
