= Nilda Moyano =

Politician in Argentina

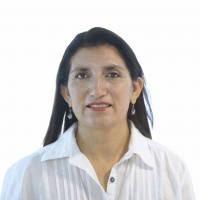

National Deputy
- Incumbent
- Assumed office 16 December 2021
- Constituency: Santiago del Estero

Personal details
- Born: 5 June 1976 (age 49)
- Party: Frente de Todos
- Occupation: Teacher

Nilda Moyano (born 5 June 1976) is an Argentine politician who sits as a member of the Chamber of Deputies elected in Santiago del Estero Province since 2021. She assumed office on 16 December 2021 following the death of Silvia Sayago.

== Biography ==
Moyano was elected in 2021.
