= Ingrid Jetter =

Argentine politician

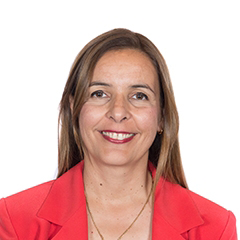

Member of the Argentine Chamber of Deputies
- In office 10 December 2019 – 10 December 2023
- Constituency: Corrientes Province

Personal details
- Party: Republican Proposal

Ingrid Jetter is an Argentine politician from the Republican Proposal. She was a member of the Argentine Chamber of Deputies from 2019 to 2023.

Jetter was previously mayor of Riachuelo. In March 2025, she resigned as president of the Pensar en Corrientes Foundation.

== See also ==
- List of Argentine deputies, 2019–2021
- List of Argentine deputies, 2021–2023
