= Deán Funes, Argentina =

Deán Funes
- City
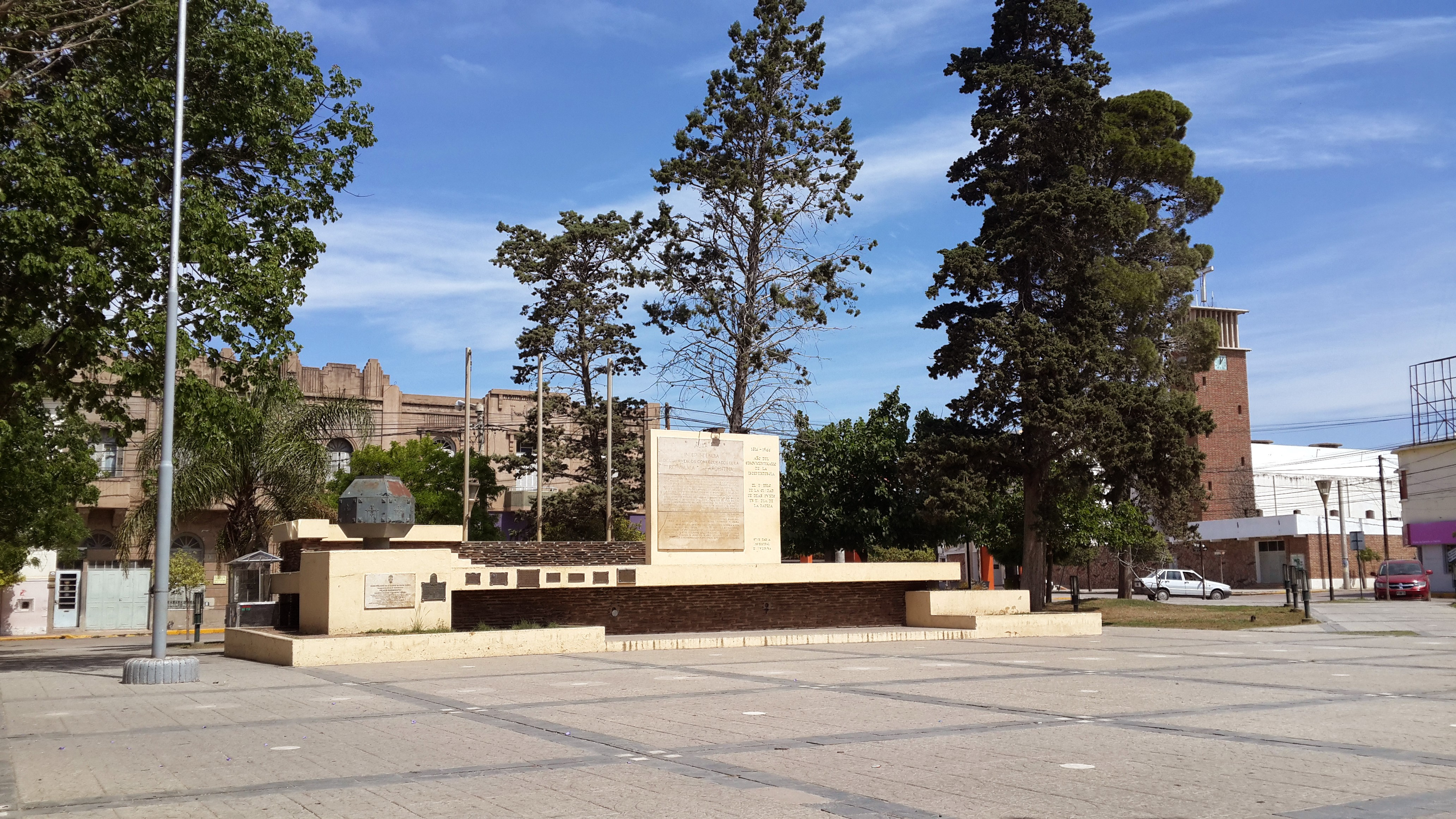

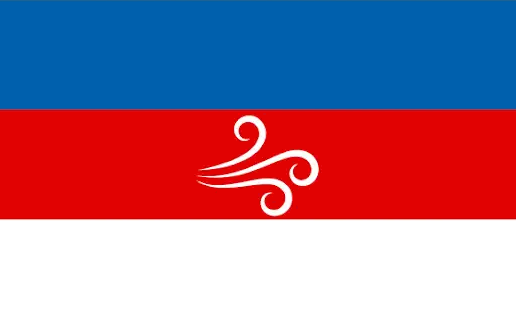
- Flag

- Location of Deán Funes in Argentina
- Coordinates: 30°26′S 64°21′W
- Country: Argentina
- Province: Córdoba
- Department: Ischilín

Government
  - Intendant: Andrea Nievas
- Elevation: 700 m (2,300 ft)

Population (2010 census)
  - Total: 21,211
- Time zone: UTC−3 (ART)
- CPA base: X5200
- Dialing code: +54 3521

Deán Funes is a city in the province of Córdoba, Argentina. It has 20,164 inhabitants per the 2001 census [INDEC], and is the head town of the Ischilín Department. It is the largest city in the northwest of the province. It lies by National Route 60, 118 km from the provincial capital Córdoba.

== History ==
The settlement was founded as Villa de Deán Funes on 9 March 1875, when the Ferrocarril Central Norte from Córdoba reached the area. It received its name honouring Gregorio Funes, a writer and deacon of the Archdiocese of Córdoba who was a deputy to the Junta Grande after the May Revolution of 1810. It received a strong wave of immigration, chiefly made up of Spaniards, Italians, people from Arab countries, and Yugoslavs. The town was officially declared a city on 29 October 1929.

In November 2025, in celebration of its 150th anniversary, Deán Funes adopted a new flag after a competition with over 60 participants.

== Transportation ==
The city hosts the Northern Córdoba Tradition Festival annually in the first half of January.
