= Leandro N. Alem, Misiones =

Leandro N. Alem
- City
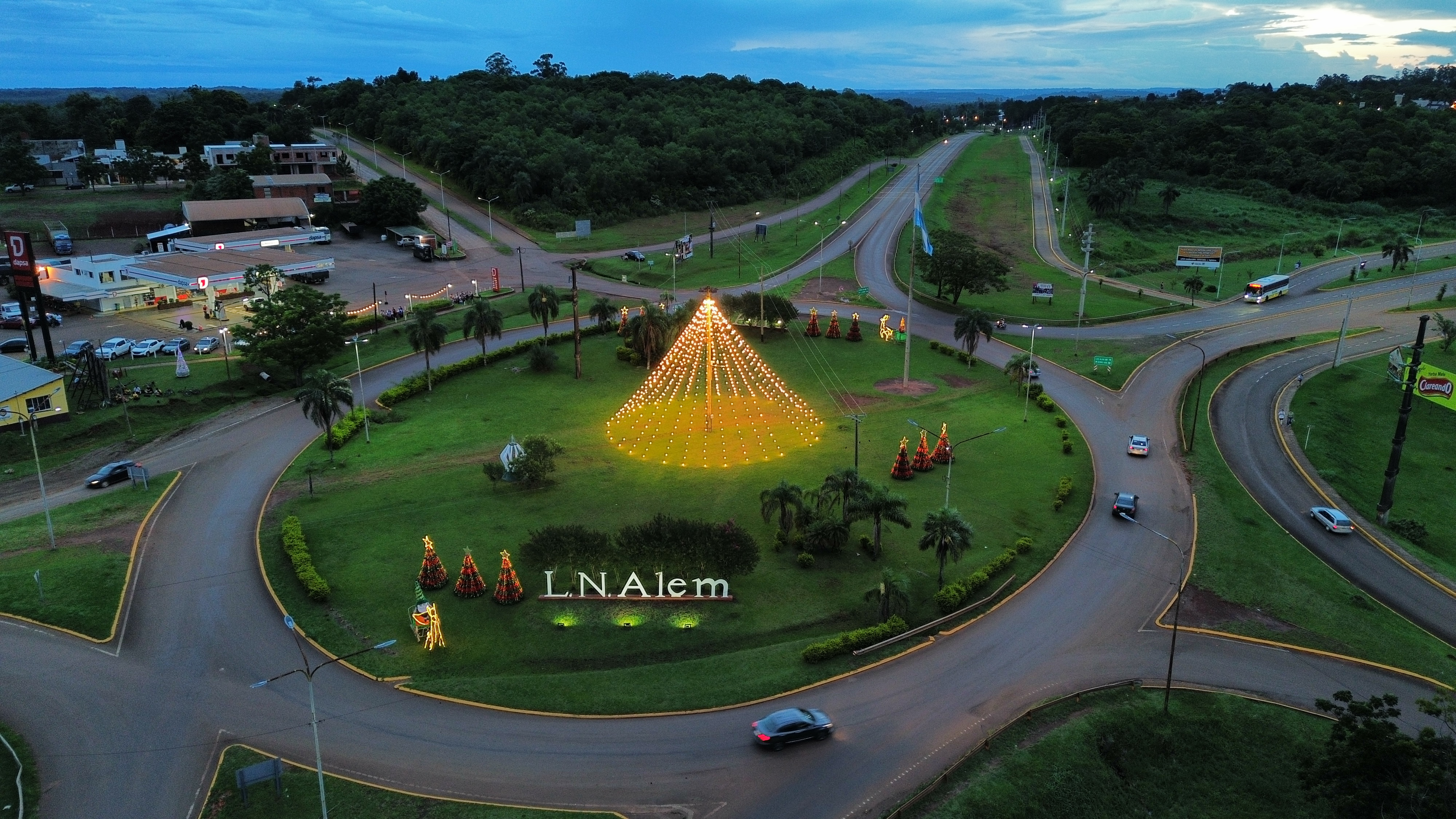

- Location of Leandro N. Alem in Argentina Leandro N. Alem (Argentina)
- Coordinates: 27°36′S 55°20′W
- Country: Argentina
- Province: Misiones
- Department: Leandro N. Alem

Government
  - Mayor: Mario Matías Sebely (Frente Renovador de la Concordia)
- Elevation: 280 m (920 ft)

Population (2022)
  - Total: 32,289
- Time zone: UTC−3 (ART)
- CPA base: N3315
- Dialing code: +54 3754

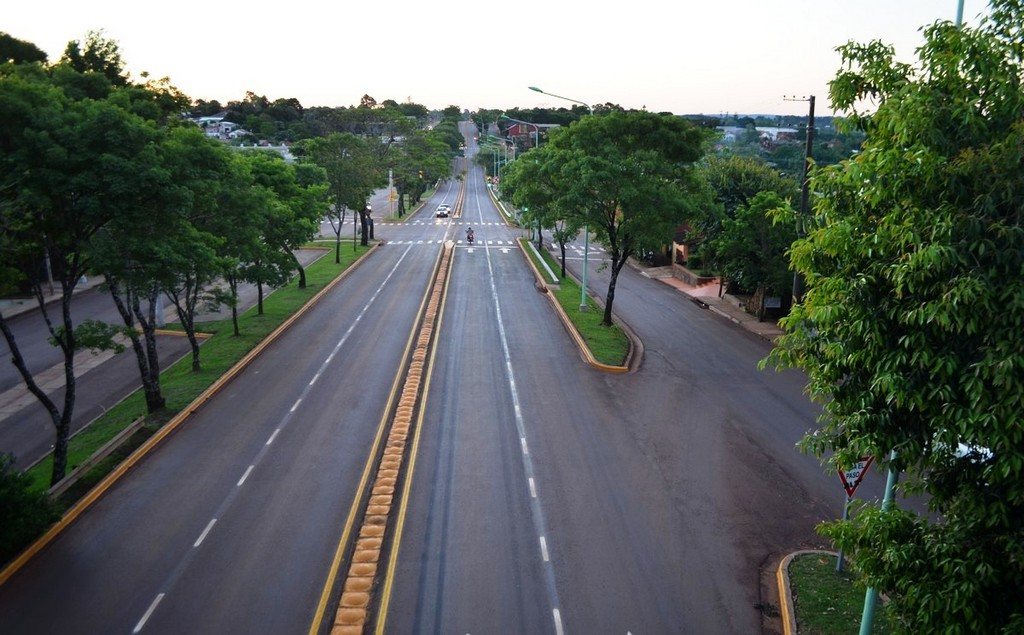
Autovía de la ciudad de Leandro N. Alem, Misiones, Argentina.

Leandro N. Alem is a city in the province of Misiones, Argentina, and the head town of the department of the same name. At the 2001 census [INDEC] it had a population of 25,404 inhabitants.

The city is named after Leandro Alem (1844–1896), one of the founders of the Radical Civic Union.
