= Gabriela Cerruti =

Argentine politician

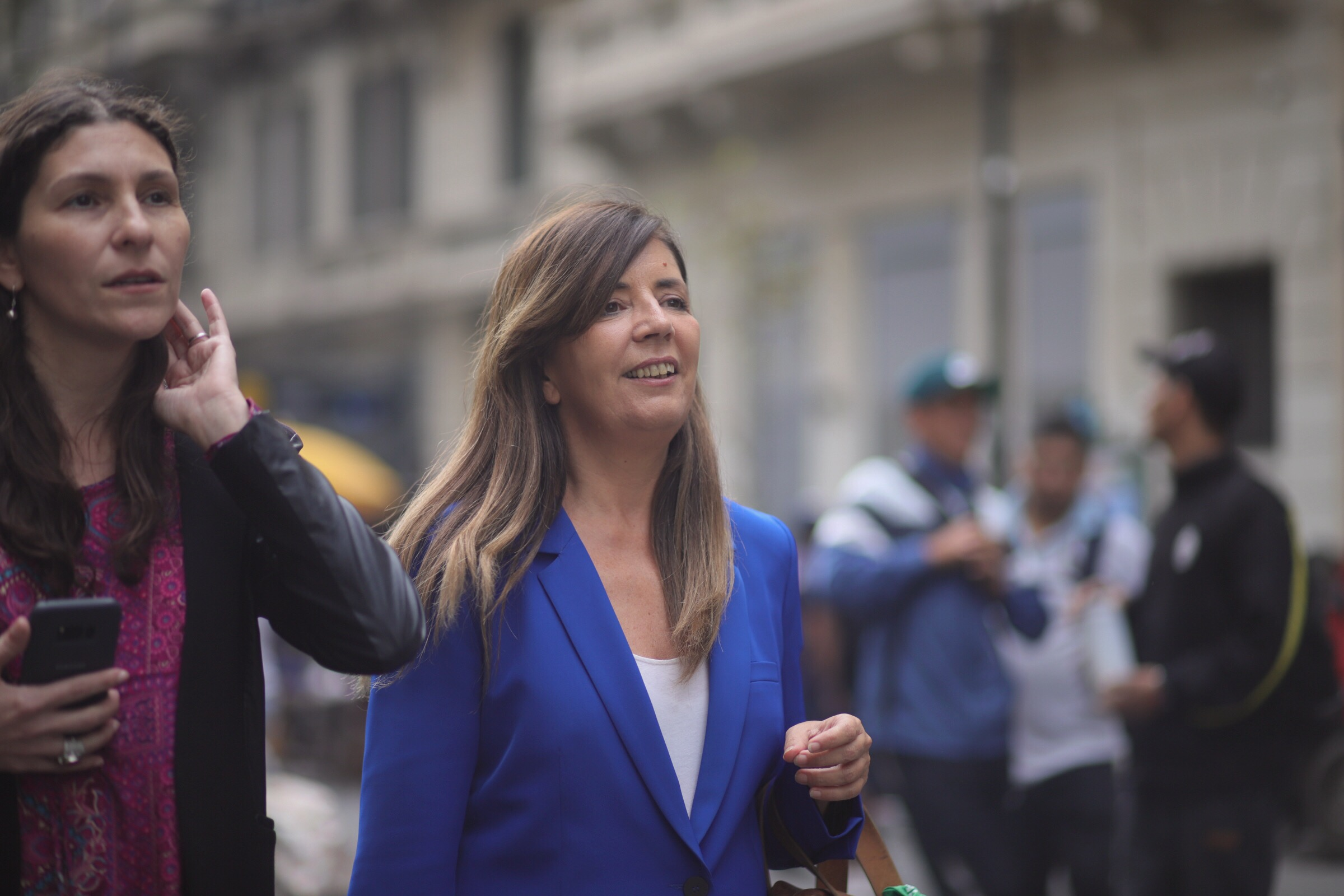

National Deputy
- In office 10 December 2017 – 13 October 2021
- Constituency: City of Buenos Aires

Legislator of the City of Buenos Aires
- In office 10 December 2007 – 10 December 2015

Minister of Social and Human Rights of the City of Buenos Aires
- In office 7 March 2006 – 10 December 2007
- Mayor: Jorge Telerman
- Preceded by: Gabriela Alegre
- Succeeded by: Helio Rebot

Personal details
- Born: Gabriela Carla Cerruti; 9 December 1965 (age 60) Punta Alta, Argentina
- Party: New Encounter
- Other political affiliations: Front for Victory (until 2017); Citizen's Unity (2017–2019); Frente de Todos (2019–present)
- Spouse: Lucas Guagnini (1997–2007)
- Education: University of Westminster
- Occupation: Journalist, writer, politician
- Website: www.gabrielacerruti.com

Gabriela Carla Cerruti (born 9 December 1965) is an Argentine journalist, writer, and politician. She was a member of the Chamber of Deputies representing Buenos Aires from 2017 to 2021, as part of the Front for Victory bloc, and later as part of the Frente de Todos bloc. She served as the official spokesperson for Alberto Fernández, President of Argentina.

In 2007, she was elected to the Buenos Aires City Legislature, and subsequently re-elected for the 2011–2015 term. She was part of the New Encounter bloc, a party for which she was one of the main leaders in her district.

== Early life and education ==
Gabriela Cerruti began her university studies in journalism at the National University of La Plata's School of Journalism and Social Communication in 1983. She pursued graduate studies at the Center for Communication and Information Studies of the University of Westminster in London, where she graduated with a Master of Arts with the thesis The War Against the Public Sphere.

She completed a PhD at the University of Westminster, with a thesis on the destruction of the public sphere during the self-proclaimed National Reorganization Process that governed Argentina from 1976 to 1983 when Argentina invaded the Falkland Islands. She has noted that Argentina's claim to the islands is supported by other nearby countries, and a political rather than a military solution is the only option.

== Career in journalism ==
Beginning in 1983, she alternated her studies and her teaching activity with the professional, making various contributions, first for different media in La Plata and Buenos Aires and then, in 1985, as editor at the national news agency Noticias Argentinas. In 1987, she became a reporter at the weekly Somos, El Periodista, and Página/12.

She continued her professional development at Página/12, going through different posts as a special editor until 1991, an editor until 1993, and a special correspondent to Thailand, Vietnam, Washington D.C., New York, Paris, Brussels, Rome, Frankfurt, Bonn, Strasbourg, Mexico, Chile, Uruguay, and Madrid.

In September 1991, she published her first book, El Octavo círculo. Crónica y entretelones de la Argentina Menemista, with Sergio Ciancaglini at Editorial Planeta of Buenos Aires.

In June 1993, she published El Jefe, vida y obra de Carlos Saúl Menem, a bestseller reissued 19 times. This book earned her reviews in all the most prominent media in Argentina and in El País (Spain), The Guardian and Financial Times (United Kingdom), and The New York Times (United States). In 1993, she was appointed correspondent of Página/12 in London, during which time she continued her postgraduate studies and specialized in issues related to collective memory.

Back in her home country, in 1995 she became Chief of the Political Section of Página/12 until 1997, when she founded and assumed direction of the weekly Trespuntos, where an interview with Alfredo Astiz was published. In June of that same year she published her third book Herederos del Silencio, a testimonial essay also at Editorial Planeta.

Although at the university level she had already been committed to political activity since her participation at the Student Center of Journalism and Social Communication, in the Student Council, and as a member of the Commission for the reform of the curriculum of the School of Social Communication of the National University of La Plata, it was in the year 2000 when she fully entered into public service. She participated in the foundation and assumed Executive Direction of the Provincial Commission for the Memory of Buenos Aires Province. From that year until 2004 she also directed Puentes, a debate magazine on the construction of collective memory published by the Commission.

== Political career ==
Around 2004, Cerruti began working in the field of the Government of the Autonomous City of Buenos Aires, coordinating the Open City Program under the Ministry of Culture, until in November 2004 she assumed the Cabinet Office of the Vice-Government Office. Then, in March 2006, she was appointed the city's Minister of Human and Social Rights.

In the elections held in Buenos Aires in June 2007, she headed list 505 of that city's deputies, and was elected to serve from December 2007 to December 2011. During the first two years, she was a member of the Commissions of Economic Development, Mercosur, and Employment Policies; Woman, Childhood, Adolescence and Youth; and Public Works and Services. Until the end of 2010, she was also on the Committee for Budget, Finance, Financial Administration, and Tax Policy. During 2010 and 2011, she was on the Commission on Constitutional Affairs and the Special Commission on Public Policies for Full Citizenship.

In March 2010, making use of her perspective, experience, and public commitment as an official and journalist, she turned over the result of an investigation carried out during more than two years of legislative work in her book El pibe. Negocios, intrigas y secretos de Mauricio Macri, el hombre que quiere ser Presidente, also for Editorial Planeta.

In 2009, she joined the New Encounter parliamentary bloc. In July 2011, she renewed her mandate as deputy, heading the list of the Nuevo Encuentro Front in its first electoral participation in the city as a political party after having achieved legal status in the district. She joined the parliamentary commissions on Justice, Social Communication, Protection and Use of Public Space, and continued at Constitutional Affairs.

In 2015, she was a candidate to Chief of Government of Buenos Aires for the Front for Victory, standing for the primary elections in April and the general elections in July 2015. However, she could not participate in the latter because she had obtained less than 2.2% of the votes. The internal leadership of the electoral front was in the hands of Mariano Recalde, who was a candidate in the general elections on 5 July.

In 2016, Gabriela Cerruti criminally denounced Mauricio Macri for "negotiations incompatible with the public function", citing "omissions" between two affidavits presented by Macri and "loans granted to the businessman Nicolás Caputo, one of the City's main contractors."

=== National Deputy ===
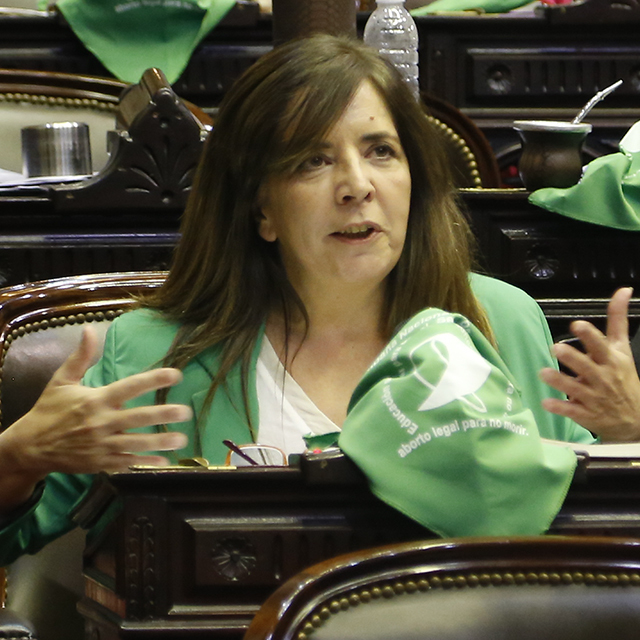
Cerruti during the 2018 debate on the legalization of abortion in the Chamber of Deputies.

In the 2017 legislative elections in the City of Buenos Aires, she participated as the second precandidate of Unidad Ciudadana in the primary with Itai Hagman (AHORA Buenos Aires) and Guillermo Moreno (Honesty and Courage). After Citizen's Unity's victory in the primary, she was presented as a second candidate for national deputy by the Autonomous City of Buenos Aires, being elected along with Daniel Filmus and Juan Cabandié, consecrating Unidad Porteña as the top opposition party in percentage of votes (21.74%).

In 2018, Cerruti spoke up in parliament in support of the legalisation of abortion. She shared her own experiences of having an abortion in a country where the procedure is illegal.

=== Presidential spokesperson ===
In October 2021, the Casa Rosada announced Cerruti would be standing down from her seat in the Chamber of Deputies in order to be appointed the official spokesperson for the Presidency of Argentina. Her position at the head of the Communications Unit of the Presidency was officialised on 15 October 2021.

== Personal life ==
Gabriela Cerruti is the daughter of Rosa Riasol and Ruggero Cerruti, and the third of six sisters: Sandra, Fabiana, Gabriela, Viviana, Carina, and Andrea. From 1997 to 2007, she was married to the journalist Lucas Guagnini, with whom she had two children.

== Works ==
- 1991: El octavo círculo, crónica de la Argentina menemista (together with Sergio Ciancaglini)
- 1996: El jefe (about former President Carlos Menem)
- 1997: Herederos del silencio (about the dictatorship)
- 2010: El pibe (about the then Head of Government of the City of Buenos Aires, Mauricio Macri)
- 2014: Vivir bien en la ciudad (proposals for better living in the city)
- 2020: La Revolución de las Viejas
