= Victoria Tejeda =

Argentine politician

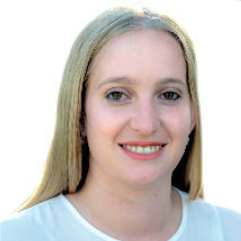

Member of the Chamber of Deputies of Argentina
- Incumbent
- Assumed office 10 December 2021

Personal details
- Born: 6 November 1988 (age 37)
- Party: Evolucion
- Occupation: Agribusiness Management Tech.

Victoria Tejeda is an Argentine politician who is a member of the Chamber of Deputies of Argentina.

== Biography ==
Tejeda worked for Agribusiness Management Tech before her election in 2021.
