= Germana Quintana =

Dominican theater director and producer

- Born: 16 July 1940 (age 86); Caracas, Venezuela
- Education: RCA Institutes
- Occupations: Theatrical director, producer

Germana Quintana (born 16 July 1940) is a Venezuelan-born theatrical and television director and producer, a pioneer of independent and musical theater in the Dominican Republic, where she is known as la señora teatro. She is the founder of several theater groups in Spain and Latin America.

== Biography ==
Germana Quintana was born in Caracas on 16 July 1940. She studied television production and directing in Havana from 1957 to 1959. In late 1959, she began working as a TV producer and director at Channel 5, Caracas. In 1961, she traveled to Mexico to take courses and workshops on television production at Columbia College. In 1962, she moved to Buenos Aires to study at Channel 13. In 1963, she began her studies in the theatrical field. In 1966, she traveled to the United States to attend RCA Institutes in New York.

She was part of the founding group of Channel 47 in New York, where she was in charge of the production of librettos for Teatro del Sábado, adapting classical theater works for television.

Quintana created and directed the Grupo Hispanoamericano de Teatro in Madrid from 1974 to 1978. She worked on Revista de Cine on TVE-2.

She moved to the Dominican Republic in 1978, and the following year began producing the Channel 4 program 3 x 3, hosted by Cecilia García and Freddy Beras-Goico. She went on to produce the children's program Tina y Tino, El Capitàn Espacio on Channel 7, and El Show de Cecilia García on Channel 4.

In 1979, Quintana and Nancy Álvarez founded the company Producciones Teatrales, which operated until 1991. They presented two or three plays a year at the Sala Ravelo and the Sala Carlos Piantini, including Heidi, La Cenicienta, Hansel y Gretel, and El Cuento de Navidad, originally by Juan Bosch. The company staged some of the first musicals in the Dominican Republic, such as Están tocando nuestra canción, starring Nancy Álvarez and Carlos Victoria.

In 1984, she founded the Teatro Arroyo Hondo. She directed it for 20 years, helping to train many future stars of Dominican theater. It premiered a play every four months, by national and international authors.

Also in 1984, she began teaching the course Radio and Television Production at the Universidad APEC. She founded the university's theater group and directed it until 2003.

In 1995, together with Lidia Ariza, she started the Fundación Pro-Arte Dramático, which sought to create an independent theater. They later founded the Teatro Las Máscaras, and opened it on 9 March 2001 with a production of the play Las Locas del Bingo.

== Awards and recognition ==
In 2014, Germana Quintana was presented with a Journalistic Merit Award by the Association of Art Chroniclers.

In 2019, she received the Corripio Art Foundation's Award for theater direction.

== Plays written ==
- No quiero ser fuerte
- La hierba no da frutos
- Mea culpa
- Mi divina loca
- La querida de don José
- La carretera
- Volvió Juanita
- La coronela
- Dolly's bar
- Tato nítido

== Selected productions ==
- 1992: 1492 epopea lirica d'America by Antonio Braga, world premiere at the Eduardo Brito National Theater
- 2001: Las locas del Bingo by American playwright Jeanne Michels and adapted by Dominican actress Patricia Muñoz, first performed at Teatro Las Máscaras. Holds the national record with 203 performances, and was the first play presented in the Sala Ravelo at the Eduardo Brito National Theater.
- 2003–2004: Las viejas vienen marchando, with more than 100 performances. Niurka Mota nominated for the 2004 Casandra Award (now Soberano Award) for Best Actress.
- 2006–2008: El prestamista, with more than 100 performances. Éxmin Carvajal nominated for the 2006 Casandra Award for Best Actor.
- 2012: Brujas somos todas by Santiago Moncada, produced by Atrévete, SRL by Gianni Paulino, presented at the Eduardo Brito National Theater. Nominated for the 2012 Casandra Award for Best Direction.
- 2012: El resbalón de Julieta
- 2013: Locamente embarazada
- 2013: The Woman in Black by Susan Hill, produced by Atrévete, SRL by Gianni Paulino, presented at the Eduardo Brito National Theater
- 2014: La luz de un cigarrillo, won Soberano Awards for Best Direction, Actress, and Play
- 2014: Les Précieuses ridicules by Molière, produced by Atrévete, SRL by Gianni Paulino, presented at the Eduardo Brito National Theater
- 2015–2016: Toc Toc by Laurent Baffie and adapted into Spanish by Julián Quintanilla, produced by Atrévete, SRL by Gianni Paulino, presented at the Eduardo Brito National Theater
- 2016: Citas a Ciegas, won Soberano Awards for Best Actor, Actress, and Play
- 2016: Pecados Enfrentados
- 2017: Made in Dominicana, Lidia Ariza nominated for the Soberano Award for Best Actress
- 2018: Big Capital by Dominican author Iván Alcántara, produced by Gianni Paulino, presented at the Sala Ravelo at the Eduardo Brito National Theater
- 2018–2019: Las prostitutas os precederán en el reino de los cielos (Prostitutes Will Precede You Into the Kingdom of Heaven) by José Luis Martín Descalzo, originally presented as De todos será el reino de los cielos (The Kingdom of Heaven Will Belong to All). This ran for 60 performances.
- 2020: Mimosas by Santiago Moncada, produced by Atrévete, SRL by Gianni Paulino, presented outdoors at Centro Cultural Mecenas
