= Estela Hernández =

Argentine politician

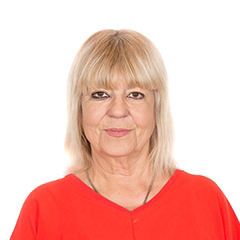

Member of the Chamber of Deputies of Argentina
- Incumbent
- Assumed office 10 December 2019
- Constituency: Chubut

Personal details
- Born: 8 September 1954 (age 71)
- Party: Frente de todos
- Relations: Frente de todos

Estela Hernández is an Argentine politician who is a member of the Chamber of Deputies of Argentina

== Biography ==
Hernández was elected in 2019.
