= Carla Carrizo =

Argentine politician (born 1966)

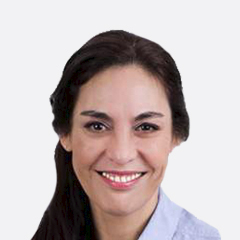

National Deputy
- Incumbent
- Assumed office 10 December 2013
- Constituency: City of Buenos Aires

Personal details
- Born: 6 August 1966 (age 60) Quilino, Córdoba Province, Argentina
- Party: Radical Civic Union
- Other political affiliations: Broad Front UNEN (2013–2015); Evolución (2017–2019); Juntos por el Cambio (2019–present)
- Education: University of Buenos Aires
- Profession: Political scientist

Ana Carla Carrizo (born 6 August 1966) is an Argentine political scientist and politician, currently serving as National Deputy elected in the City of Buenos Aires since 2013. She is a member of the Radical Civic Union (UCR).

Carrizo was director of the Political Science department at the Universidad del Salvador and is a lecturer at the University of Buenos Aires.

== Early life and career ==
Carrizo was born on 6 August 1966 in Quilino, a small town in the Ischilín Department of Córdoba Province. Her father, Raúl Carrizo, was twice member of the Argentine Chamber of Deputies for the UCR. When she was fifteen, she moved to Germany to finish high school. She later returned to Argentina and studied Political Science at the Universidad del Salvador.

Carrizo has taught at the Argentine Catholic University, the Torcuato di Tella University and the University of Buenos Aires, where she presently dictates courses on Political Sociology and Political Theory at the Faculty of Social Sciences. Carrizo was also director of the Political Science department at the Universidad del Salvador and served in the directive board of the Political Science department of the University of Buenos Aires.

Carrizo's first cousin, Soledad Carrizo, was mayor of Quilino and currently serves as a national deputy representing Córdoba Province; both were elected in 2013.

== Political career ==
Carrizo became an affiliated UCR member in 1985. She ran for a seat in the Chamber of Deputies in the 2013 legislative election, as the fourth candidate in the UNEN – Suma+ list in Buenos Aires. The list came second in the P.A.S.O. primaries on 11 August 2013, and Carrizo was later the fourth candidate in the definitive UNEN list, which came second in the legislative election on 27 October 2013, with 27.66% of the vote. Carrizo was elected, and took office on 10 December 2013.

Carrizo was re-elected in the 2017 legislative election, this time as part of the Evolución coalition; she was the second candidate in the Evolución list, behind Martín Lousteau. The list was the third-most voted with 12.33% of the vote; only Lousteau and Carrizo were elected.

As a national deputy, Carrizo was a vocal supporter of the legalization of abortion in Argentina. She voted in favor of the two Voluntary Interruption of Pregnancy bills that were debated by the Argentine Congress in 2018 and 2020.

Following the 2019 general election, Carrizo, alongside her Evolución parliamentary bloc members Martín Lousteau and Teresita Villavicencio all joined the UCR bloc; since then, she has been vice-president of the UCR bloc in the Chamber of Deputies.
