= Mabel Carrizo =

Argentine politician (born 1979)

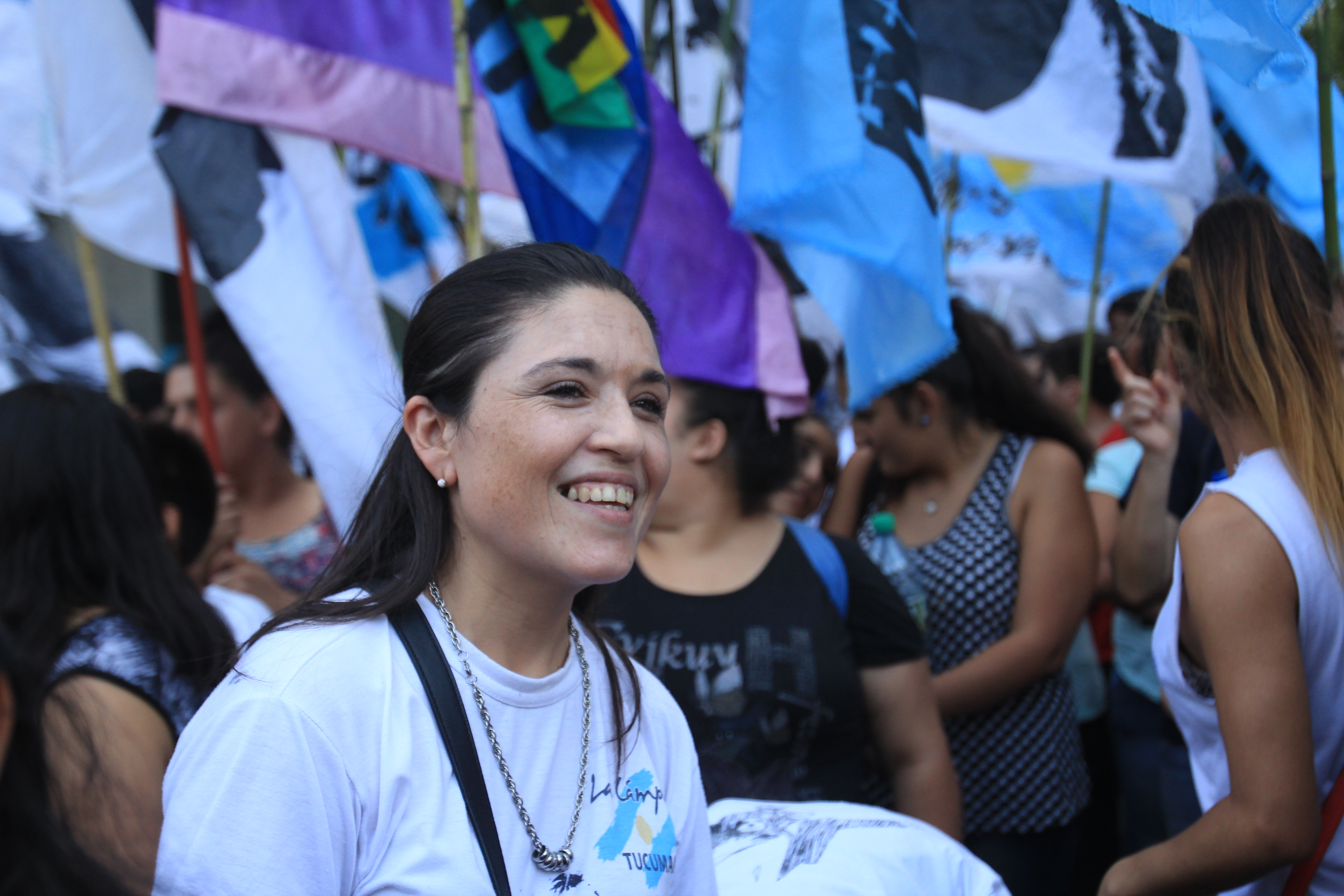

National Deputy
- In office 10 December 2019 – 10 December 2023
- Constituency: Tucumán
- In office 10 December 2013 – 10 December 2017
- Constituency: Tucumán

Personal details
- Born: 13 January 1979 (age 47) Buenos Aires, Argentina
- Party: Justicialist Party
- Other political affiliations: Front for Victory (2013–2017); Unidad Ciudadana (2017–2019); Frente de Todos (2019–present)

Nilda Mabel Carrizo (born 13 January 1979) is an Argentine teacher and politician, who served twice as National Deputy elected in Tucumán Province. A member of the Justicialist Party and La Cámpora, Carrizo served in the Chamber from 2013 to 2017 and later from 2019 to 2023. In parlamient she sat in the Frente de Todos bloc.

== Early and personal life ==
Carrizo was born on 13 January 1979 in Buenos Aires. She studied to be a primary teacher at the Instituto de Enseñanza Superior in Famaillá, Tucumán. Carrizo is married to Jesús Salim, a fellow Justicialist Party politician who was a provincial legislator in Tucumán. Salim and Carrizo have two children.

== Political career ==
Carrizo's political career began as an activist in La Cámpora, a kirchnerist youth organization. She was also a member of the Justialist Party Youth council. Before being elected to office, she was an administrative worker at the Superintendencia de Riesgo del Trabajo (SRT), Argentina's labour work risk assessment agency. In the 2013 legislative election, Carrizo ran in the Front for Victory list in Tucumán as the third candidate, behind (then) Health Minister Juan Manzur and Osvaldo Jaldo. The list received 46.94% of the vote, not enough for Carrizo to make it past the D'Hondt cut; however, Manzur never took office, as he remained in his position as Health Minister, and Carrizo was sworn in as deputy in his stead.

Carrizo's term ended in 2017, and she did not stand for re-election. She would run again in 2019, this time as the second candidate in the Frente de Todos list, behind Mario Leito. The list received 51.9% of the vote, and both Leito and Carrizo were elected.

During her 2019–2023 term, Carrizo formed part of the parliamentary commissions on Pensions and Social Security, Families and Childhood, Education, Elderly People, Science and Technology, Social Action and Public Health, and Sports. She was also a supporter of the 2020 Voluntary Interruption of Pregnancy bill, which legalized abortion in Argentina.
