= Susana Alicia Laciar =

Argentine politician

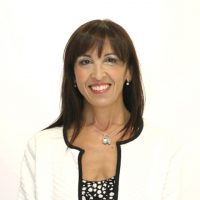

Member of the Chamber of Deputies of Argentina
- Incumbent
- Assumed office 10 December 2021
- Constituency: San Juan, Argentina

Personal details
- Born: 31 January 1969 (age 57)
- Party: Production and Labour

Susana Alicia Laciar is an Argentine politician who is a member of the Chamber of Deputies of Argentina.

== Biography ==
Laciar worked as a lawyer before her election in 2021.
