= Jorge Rizzotti =

Argentine politician

Member of the Chamber of Deputies of Argentina

Jorge Rizzotti is an Argentine politician who is a member of the Chamber of Deputies of Argentina.
