= Marcela Coli =

Argentine politician

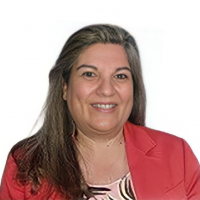

Member of the Chamber of Deputies of Argentina
- Incumbent
- Assumed office 10 December 2021
- Constituency: La Pampa Province

Personal details
- Born: 14 June 1963 (age 63)
- Relations: Radical Civic Union
- Occupation: Teacher

Marcela Coli is an Argentine politician who is a member of the Chamber of Deputies of Argentina.

== Biography ==
Coli worked as a teacher before she was elected in 2021.
