= Diego Sartori =

Argentine politician

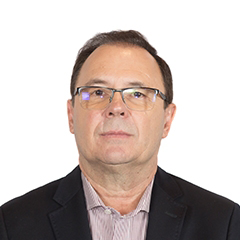

National Deputy
- Incumbent
- Assumed office 10 December 2019
- Constituency: Misiones
- In office 10 December 2003 – 10 December 2007
- Constituency: Misiones

Mayor of Leandro N. Alem
- In office 10 December 2011 – 10 December 2019
- Preceded by: Waldemar Wolenberg
- Succeeded by: Waldemar Wolenberg

Provincial Deputy of Misiones
- In office 10 December 2007 – 10 December 2011
- In office 10 December 1999 – 10 December 2003

Personal details
- Born: 8 January 1959 (age 67) Leandro N. Alem, Misiones, Argentina
- Party: Justicialist Party (until 2007); Front for the Renewal of Concord (since 2007)

Diego Horacio Sartori (born 8 January 1959) is an Argentine politician currently serving as a National Deputy elected in Misiones Province since 2019. A member of the regionalist Front for the Renewal of Concord (FRC), Sartori previously served as deputy from 2003 to 2007. He also served two consecutive terms as mayor of his hometown, Leandro N. Alem, from 2011 to 2019. In addition, he has served as a member of the provincial legislature of Misiones on two occasions.

== Early and personal life ==
Sartori was born on 8 January 1959 in Leandro N. Alem, Misiones Province. He finished high school at the Escuela de Comercio Nº 6, graduating with a tax liquidation technician's degree in 1976. In 1998, he completed a degree on public policy from the George Washington University. Sartori is married to Heidy Schirse, and has three children.

== Political career ==
Sartori's political career began in the Justicialist Party. From 1995 to 1999, he was a member of the City Council of Leandro N. Alem, and from 1997 to 1999 he was a member of the party congress of the Misiones Justicialist Party. Later, from 1999 to 2003, he was a member of the Misiones Chamber of Representatives. In the 2003 legislative election, he was elected to the National Chamber of Deputies on the Justicialist Party list, which received 34.12% of the vote and came second behind the Front for the Renewal of Concord (FRC) list.

Toward the end of his term as deputy, he was once again elected as a member of the Misiones Legislature, only this time as part of the Front for the Renewal of Concord. He served his term until 2011, when he was elected as intendente (mayor) of Leandro N. Alem. He was re-elected in 2015.

Sartori ran for a second term as a member of the lower house of the National Congress in the 2019 legislative election, as the first candidate in the FRC list. The FRC was the third-most voted alliance in the province, with 28.62% of the vote, and Sartori was the only candidate in the list to be elected.

During his 2019–2023 term, Sartori formed part of the parliamentary commissions on Budget and Finances, Transport, and Economy. He was an opponent of the legalisation of abortion in Argentina, voting against the 2020 Voluntary Interruption of Pregnancy bill, which passed the Chamber. Since 2021, he has been president of the FRC parliamentary bloc in the Chamber of Deputies, organised within the "Provincias Unidas" inter-bloc.
