= Paula Omodeo =

Argentine politician

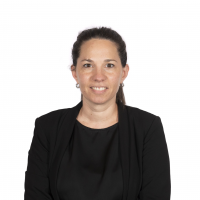

National Deputy
- Incumbent
- Assumed office 10 December 2021
- Constituency: Tucumán

Personal details
- Born: 19 August 1986 (age 39)
- Party: Creo Tucumán
- Other political affiliations: Juntos por el Cambio
- Occupation: Lawyer

Paula Omodeo (born 19 August 1986) is an Argentine politician, currently sitting as a National Deputy elected in Tucumán Province since 2021. She is a member of the local CREO party, founded and led by Sebastián Murga.

== Biography ==
Omodeo was born on 19 August 1986. She attended the Universidad Austral and graduated in 2009 as a lawyer. She practised law in multiple firms. Later on, she was able to lecture on law at the Pontifical Catholic University of Argentina (UCA). In 2021, she was elected to the Chamber of Deputies for Tucumán Province.
