= Natalia Zabala Chacur =

Argentine politician

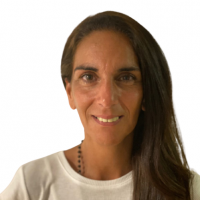

National Deputy
- In office 21 December 2021 – 10 December 2023
- Constituency: San Luis

Personal details
- Born: 15 January 1978 (age 48)
- Party: Justicialist Party
- Other political affiliations: Frente de Todos (2021–2023); Union for the Homeland (2023–present)
- Occupation: Accountant

Natalia Zabala Chacur (born 15 January 1978) is an Argentine politician. From 2021 to 2023 she served as a National Deputy elected in San Luis Province for the Frente de Todos (and later Union for the Homeland) coalitions.

== Biography ==
Chacur worked as an accountant before she was elected.
