= Juan Marino =

Argentine politician

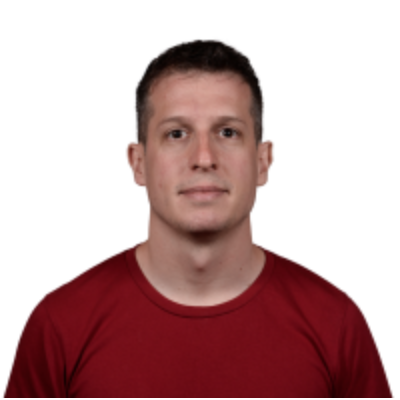

National Deputy
- Incumbent
- Assumed office 2 August 2022
- Preceded by: Sergio Massa
- Constituency: Buenos Aires

Personal details
- Born: November 25, 1987 (age 38) Argentina
- Party: Piquetero Party
- Parent: Gabriela Saidón
- Profession: Social leader Politician

Juan Marino (born 25 November 1987) is an Argentine social and political leader of the Piqueteros' Party. He has been a Deputy of the Argentine Nation for Buenos Aires since 2022.

== Early life and education ==
Marino was born on 25 November 1987 in General Madariaga, and began his activism as a high school student at the age of 15. He is a business expert and a graduate in Commercial Sciences from the Escuela Superior de Comercio Carlos Pellegrini, an institution of which he became president of its student center in 2006, under list 1 "FEL".

== Political Career ==
He served on the national leadership of the Union of Youth for Socialism - Workers' Party (UJS - PO) from 2006 to 2009, as well as on the Central Committee of the Federal Capital of the Workers' Party (PO) between 2008 and 2009. However, his time in the PO came to an end in 2009 when he was expelled from the party.

On April 2, 2010, Marino founded the Revolutionary Piquetera Tendency (TPR) and, later, the Piquetera Villera Group (today the Piquetera Unit).

Marino later founded the Piqueteros' Party in 2018.

In 2017, he ran as a candidate for national deputy for the Popular Encounter for Land, Roof and Work, a front led by Luis D'Elía.

In the 2019 legislative elections, he won a place on the Frente de Todos ticket, but was not elected. In July 2021, he was appointed Provincial Director of Territorial Organization of the Ministry of Community Development of the Province of Buenos Aires. In August 2022, he was appointed Deputy of the Argentine Nation for Buenos Aires, replacing Sergio Massa, who was appointed Minister of Economy.

Marino maintains that his main task as a legislator is to pass a law that provides for a universal basic salary, although this has never materialized.

Before the 2023 Primary Elections, he presented his book "Militant Strategy, Here and Now" at the Buenos Aires Graphic Federation.

In the 2023 legislative elections he won a place in the chamber, after being placed 15th on the Union for the Homeland list.

In 2025 he was appointed by the Union for the Fatherland bloc as Secretary of the Investigative Commission on the cryptocurrency $LIBRA, created to investigate an alleged financial fraud. After the expiration of the commission's mandate in August 2025, Marino was one of the signatories of a statement in which opposition deputies denounced that the ruling party had obstructed the investigation and demanded the continuation of the inquiries, arguing that the commission was still in effect.

== Publications ==
=== Books ===
- — (2023). Militant strategy: here and now (PDF). Buenos Aires. Co-authored with Vladimir Cerrón.
- — (2024). APRIL THESIS – ENOUGH MILEI!. Buenos Aires.
