= Felipe Álvarez =

Argentine politician

Diego Felipe Álvarez
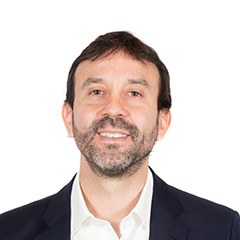

Member of the Chamber of Deputies of Argentina
- Incumbent
- Assumed office 10 December 2019
- Constituency: La Rioja

Personal details
- Born: 15 December 1980 (age 45)
- Party: Somos Energía para Renovar Santa Cru
- Occupation: Lawyer

Felipe Álvarez is an Argentine politician who is a member of the Chamber of Deputies of Argentina.

== Biography ==
Álvarez was a lawyer before he was elected in 2019.
