= Sebastián Salvador =

Argentine politician

Member of the Chamber of Deputies of Argentina
- Incumbent
- Assumed office 10 December 2019
- Constituency: Buenos Aires

Personal details
- Born: 11 September 1977 (age 48)
- Party: Radical Civic Union

Sebastián Salvador is an Argentine politician who is a member of the Chamber of Deputies of Argentina since 2019.
