= Jorge Verón =

Argentine politician

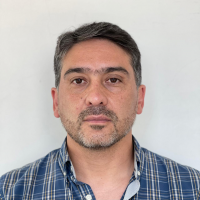

Member of the Chamber of Deputies of Argentina
- Incumbent
- Assumed office 11 February 2021
- Constituency: Santa Cruz

Personal details
- Born: January 14, 1973 (age 53)
- Party: Frente de Todos
- Occupation: Nurse

Jorge Verón is an Argentine politician who is a member of the Chamber of Deputies of Argentina.
