= Lisandro Bormioli =

Argentine politician

Member of the Chamber of Deputies of Argentina
- Incumbent
- Assumed office 10 December 2019
- Constituency: Buenos Aires

Personal details
- Born: 13 April 1975 (age 51)
- Party: Frente de Todos

Lisandro Bormioli is an Argentine politician who is a member of the Chamber of Deputies.

== Biography ==
Bormioli was elected in 2019.
