= Pedro Galimberti =

Argentine politician (born 1970)

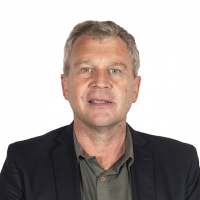

National Deputy
- Incumbent
- Assumed office 10 December 2021
- Constituency: Entre Ríos

Mayor of Chajarí
- In office 10 December 2015 – 10 December 2021
- Preceded by: José Luis Panozzo
- Succeeded by: Marcelo Borghesan

Personal details
- Born: 22 August 1970 (age 56)
- Party: Radical Civic Union
- Education: National University of La Plata
- Occupation: Lawyer

Pedro Jorge Galimberti (born 22 August 1970) is an Argentine politician and lawyer who is a member of the Chamber of Deputies, representing Entre Ríos since 2021. From 2015 to 2021, he was mayor of Chajarí.

== Biography ==
Galimberti graduated from the National University of La Plata and worked as a lawyer. He was elected mayor of Chajarí in 2015 and 2019, before resigning after his election to the Chamber of Deputies in 2021.

On 10 September 2024, he resigned from his seat to take over a position in the Salto Grande Technical Commission. He was accused of corruption for doing so just a few days before a vote on Javier Milei's veto of a bill that improved retirement benefits.
