= Pedro Dantas =

Argentine politician

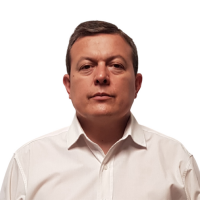

Member of the Chamber of Deputies of Argentina
- Incumbent
- Assumed office 27 March 2021

Personal details
- Born: January 19, 1972 (age 54)

Pedro Dantas is an Argentine politician who is a member of the Chamber of Deputies of Argentina.

== Biography ==
His term started in 2021.
