= Marisa Uceda =

Argentine politician

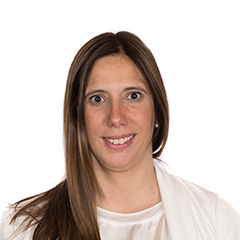

National Deputy
- In office 10 December 2019 – 10 December 2023
- Constituency: Mendoza

Personal details
- Born: 30 January 1979 (age 47)
- Party: Frente de Todos
- Occupation: Lawyer

Marisa Uceda is an Argentine politician. From 2019 to 2023 she served as a member of the Chamber of Deputies of Argentina.

== Biography ==
Uceda worked as a lawyer before she was elected in 2021.
