= Domingo Amaya =

Argentine politician

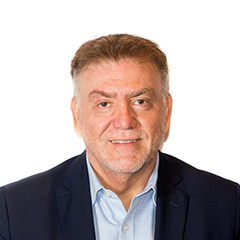

Member of the Chamber of Deputies of Argentina
- Incumbent
- Assumed office 10 December 2019
- Constituency: Tucuman

Personal details
- Born: 25 August 1958 (age 67)
- Party: ENCUENTRO FEDERAL
- Occupation: Accountant

Domingo Amaya is an Argentine politician who is a member of the Chamber of Deputies of Argentina from Tucuman. He previously worked as an accountant before being elected in 2021.
