= Natalia Souto =

Argentine politician

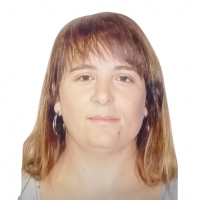

Member of the Chamber of Deputies of Argentina
- Incumbent
- Assumed office 26 October 2021
- Constituency: Buenos Aires

Personal details
- Born: 1 April 1975 (age 51)
- Relations: Frente de Todos

Natalia Souto is an Argentine politician currently serving as a member of the Chamber of Deputies of Argentina.

== Biography ==
Souto was elected in 2021.
