= Lucas Godoy =

Argentine politician (born 1982)

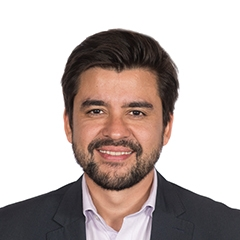

National Deputy
- In office 10 December 2019 – 10 December 2023
- Constituency: Salta

Provincial Deputy of Salta
- In office 10 December 2011 – 10 December 2019
- Constituency: Capital Department

Personal details
- Born: 25 March 1982 (age 44) Salta, Argentina
- Party: Justicialist Party
- Other political affiliations: Frente de Todos (2019–2023)
- Education: National University of Tucumán

Lucas Javier Godoy (born 25 March 1982) is an Argentine lawyer and politician. A member of the Justicialist Party, Godoy was a National Deputy elected in Salta Province from 2019 to 2023. He was a member of the Salta Province Chamber of Deputies from 2011 to 2019.

== Early life and education ==
Godoy was born on 25 March 1982 in Salta. His father is Manuel Santiago Godoy, a Justicialist Party politician who was president of the Salta Province Chamber of Deputies. He has three siblings, is married, and has two children.

Godoy studied law at the National University of Tucumán, graduating in 2006, and has a degree on parliamentary law and legislation from Universidad San Pablo-T.

== Political career ==
In the 2011 provincial elections, Godoy was the second candidate in the Justicialist Party list to the Provincial Chamber of Deputies, behind Guido Giacosa. The list came second in the general election, and Godoy was elected. He was re-elected in 2015, winning the P.A.S.O. primaries with 22,237 votes, and coming third in the general election behind the Romero+Olmedo Front and Republican Proposal. As provincial deputy, Godoy presided the Human Rights parliamentary commission, and during his two terms, he was the legislator who introduced the most bills to the Chamber.

Ahead of the 2019 general election, Godoy and Noelia Bonetto competed in the Frente de Todos primaries to the Argentine Chamber of Deputies against the list of Jorge Guaymás and Verónica Caliva. Godoy's list won the primaries, and in the end, the Frente de Todos list was composed of Godoy and Caliva. The list received 46.08% of the popular vote and both Godoy and Caliva were elected. He was sworn in on 4 December 2019.

As a national deputy, Godoy formed part of the parliamentary commissions on Commerce, Consumer Rights, Modernization of Parliamentary Procedure, Industry, Justice, General Legislation, Public Works, and Small and Medium-sized Enterprises. Despite his personal opposition to the practice, Godoy was a supporter of the legalization of abortion in Argentina, voting in favour of the 2020 Voluntary Interruption of Pregnancy bill that passed the Argentine Congress.
