= Guillermo Carnaghi =

Argentine politician

Member of the Chamber of Deputies of Argentina
- Incumbent
- Assumed office 24 September 2020
- Constituency: Neuquen

Personal details
- Born: 8 October 1952 (age 73)
- Party: Frente de Todos

Guillermo Carnaghi is an Argentine politician who is a member of the Chamber of Deputies of Argentina.

== Biography ==
Carnaghi was elected in 2021.
