= Rodrigo de Loredo =

Argentine politician (born 1980)

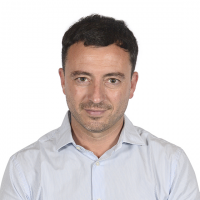

National Deputy
- Incumbent
- Assumed office 10 December 2021
- Constituency: Córdoba

Provincial Legislator of Córdoba
- In office 10 December 2011 – 10 December 2015
- Constituency: Provincial List

Personal details
- Born: 21 February 1980 (age 46)
- Party: Radical Civic Union
- Other political affiliations: Evolución; Juntos por el Cambio

Rodrigo de Loredo (born 21 February 1980) is an Argentine politician and lawyer who has been a National Deputy elected in Córdoba Province since 2021. He belongs to the Radical Civic Union (UCR), and since 2023 he has been president of the UCR parliamentary bloc in the Chamber of Deputies.

In 2025, congressman de Loredo confirmed that he will not seek reelection and will complete his current term on December 10.

== Biography ==
He graduated as a lawyer from the National University of Córdoba and worked at his father-in-law’s firm, Aguad & Asociados.
