= Eber Pérez Plaza =

Argentine politician

Eber Albano Perez Plaza
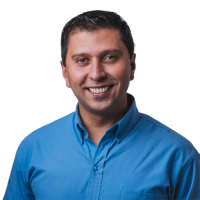

Member of the Chamber of Deputies of Argentina
- Incumbent
- Assumed office 27 March 2021
- Constituency: Mendoza

Personal details
- Born: 21 September 1989 (age 36)
- Party: Frente de Todos
- Occupation: Lawyer

Eber Pérez Plaza is an Argentine politician who is a member of the Chamber of Deputies of Argentina representing Mendoza since 2021. He previously worked as an attorney before venturing into politics.
