= Ischilín Department =

Ischilín Department Departamento Ischilín
- Department
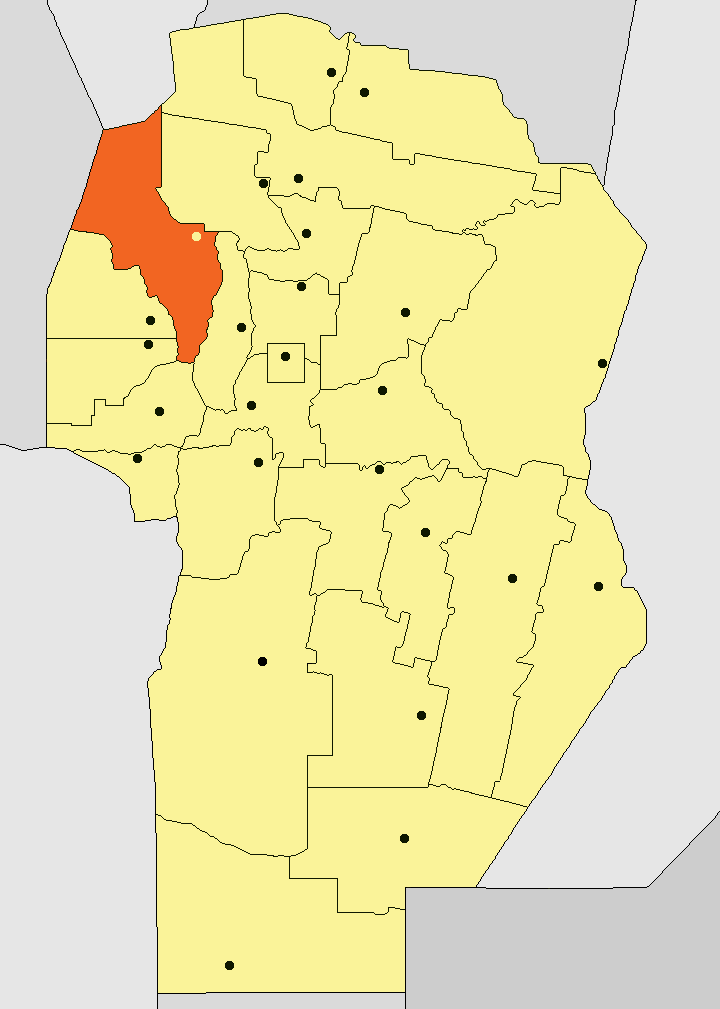
- Location of Ischilín Department in Córdoba Province
- Coordinates: 30°25′S 64°20′W
- Country: Argentina
- Province: Córdoba
- Capital: Deán Funes

Area
  - Total: 5,123 km^{2} (1,978 sq mi)

Population (2001 census [INDEC])
  - Total: 30,105
  - Density: 5.876/km^{2} (15.22/sq mi)
  - Pop. change (1991-2001): +6.23%
- Time zone: UTC-3 (ART)
- Postal code: X5200
- Dialing code: 03521
- Distances to
- Buenos Aires: 834 km (518 mi)
- Córdoba: 125 km (78 mi)

Ischilín Department is a department of Córdoba Province in Argentina.

The provincial subdivision has a population of about 30,105 inhabitants in an area of 5,123 km^{2}, and its capital city is Deán Funes, which is located around 834 km from Capital Federal.

== Settlements ==
- Avellaneda
- Cañada de Río Pinto
- Chuña
- Copacabana
- Deán Funes
- Los Pozos
- Olivares de San Nicolás
- Quilino
- Villa Gutiérrez
