= Silvia Sayago =

Argentine politician (1955–2021)

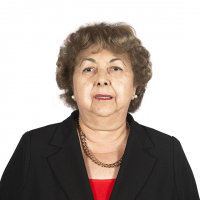

National Deputy
- In office 10 December 2021 – 12 December 2021
- Constituency: Santiago del Estero

Provincial Deputy of Santiago del Estero
- In office 10 December 2017 – 9 December 2021

Personal details
- Born: Silvia Noemí del Valle Sayago; 2 March 1955 Santiago del Estero, Argentina
- Died: 12 December 2021 (aged 66) Santiago del Estero, Argentina
- Party: Civic Front for Santiago
- Other political affiliations: Frente de Todos (2019–2021)

Silvia Noemí del Valle Sayago (2 March 1955 – 12 December 2021) was an Argentine politician. A member of the Civic Front for Santiago she served in the Argentine Chamber of Deputies from 10 December 2021 until her sudden death due to organ failure two days later, on 12 December 2021.
