= Luis Di Giacomo =

Argentine politician

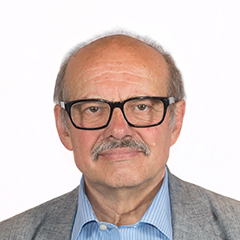

National Deputy
- In office 10 December 2019 – 10 December 2023
- Constituency: Río Negro

Minister of Government of Río Negro
- In office 27 September 2012 – 10 December 2019
- Governor: Alberto Weretilneck
- Preceded by: Hugo Lastra
- Succeeded by: Rodrigo Buteler

Provincial Legislator of Río Negro
- In office 10 December 2003 – 10 December 2007
- Constituency: Provincial list

Personal details
- Born: 29 April 1954 (age 72) Avellaneda, Buenos Aires Province, Argentina
- Party: Intransigent Party (1988–1992); Patagonian People's Movement (1992–2003); Broad Front (2003–2015); Together We Are Río Negro (2015–present)
- Education: University of Buenos Aires

Luis Di Giacomo (born 29 April 1954) is an Argentine psychiatrist and politician. A member of the regionalist Together We Are Río Negro party, Di Giacomo was elected in 2019 as a National Deputy for Río Negro Province, and served until 2023.

Di Giacomo previously served as Minister of Government of Río Negro from 2012 to 2019, during the governorship of Alberto Weretilneck. Prior to that, he was a member of the Provincial Legislature of Río Negro from 2003 to 2007, and a member of the City Council of General Roca on numerous occasions.

== Early life and career ==
Di Giacomo was born on 29 April 1954 in Avellaneda, in the Greater Buenos Aires, to Italian immigrant parents. He studied medicine at the University of Buenos Aires, graduating in 1978, and specialized in psychiatry at the Provincial Public Health Council of Río Negro Province. Di Giacomo worked as a medical professional at the Centro Neurológico LEMNOS in General Roca, Río Negro, and at the Fundación Confluencia Patagónica para la Salud. In addition, he has taught postgraduate courses on cognitive therapies at the National University of La Plata.

Di Giacomo has lived in General Roca since the 1980s. He is married and has four children.

== Political career ==
Di Giacomo has been politically active since the last military dictatorship; his political activism began in the Intransigent Party (PI). He was elected president of the Río Negro chapter of the PI in 1988. Later, in 1992, he became a founding member of the Patagonian People's Movement (MPP), and co-wrote the new party's official charter. In 1995, Di Giacomo was elected to the General Roca City Council, serving in the position until 1999. In 2003, he was elected to the Provincial Legislature, as part of the Broad Front party list. In 2007, he was re-elected to the City Council as part of the Front for Victory. From 2011 to 2012, he was President of the General Roca City Council.

In 2012, Governor Alberto Weretilneck appointed Di Giacomo as the new Minister of Government of the province, succeeding Hugo Lastra, who became Secretary General of Governance. Di Giacomo remained in the position after the re-election of Weretilneck in 2015. That year, Di Giacomo became a co-founder of Juntos Somos Río Negro, (JSRN, "Together We Are Río Negro") a regionalist political party based on the electoral coalition that had led Weretilneck to re-election.

=== National Deputy ===
In the 2019 legislative election, Di Giacomo ran in the JSRN list to the Chamber of Deputies in Río Negro as the first candidate. The JSRN list was the second-most voted, with 32.05% of the vote, and Di Giacomo was the only candidate in the list to be elected. He was sworn in on 4 December 2019. As the only deputy from JSRN, he presided the single-member JSRN bloc in the Chamber during the 2019–2021 legislative term, and formed part of the "Unidad Federal" inter-bloc, presided by José Luis Ramón.

As a national deputy, Di Giacomo presided the parliamentary commission on Addictions Prevention and Drug-trafficking control, and formed part of the commissions on Foreign Affairs, Small and Medium-sized Companies, and Regional Economies and Development. He was also a supporter of the 2020 Voluntary Interruption of Pregnancy bill, which legalized abortion in Argentina.

Following the 2021 legislative election, the Unidad Federal inter-bloc was dissolved, and instead a new bloc, called "Provincias Unidas", was formed between members of regional parties not aligned with either the national government or the Juntos por el Cambio opposition. JSRN, which elected another deputy in the 2021 election, formed part of the bloc alongside Misiones' FRC and Neuquén's MPN. Di Giacomo was elected to be the five-member inter-bloc's president.
