= Lidia Ascárate =

Argentine politician

Member of the Chamber of Deputies of Argentina
- Incumbent
- Assumed office 10 December 2019
- Constituency: Tucuman

Personal details
- Born: 24 January 1951
- Party: Radical Civic Union
- Occupation: Accountant

Lidia Ascárate is an Argentine politician who is a member of the Chamber of Deputies of Argentina

She was elected in 2019.
