= Verónica Caliva =

Argentine politician

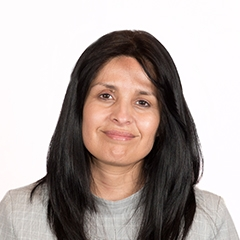

National Deputy
- Incumbent
- Assumed office 10 December 2019
- Constituency: Salta

Personal details
- Born: 12 April 1977 (age 49) General Güemes, Salta Province, Argentina
- Party: Revolutionary Communist Party; Frente de Todos (2019–present)
- Education: National University of Salta
- Profession: Journalist and politician

Lía Verónica Caliva (born 12 April 1977) is an Argentine journalist and politician, currently serving as National Deputy representing Salta Province. A member of the Revolutionary Communist Party, Caliva was elected in 2019, and currently sits in the Frente de Todos bloc.

== Early life and education ==
Caliva was born on 12 April 1977 in General Güemes, in Salta Province. She finished high school at the Escuela Nacional de Educación Técnica Nº 1 Juana Azurduy, graduating in 1992, and studied communication sciences at the National University of Salta. She also has a teaching degree from the Colegio Nacional Mariano Moreno.

In 2005, Caliva co-founded Fundación entre Mujeres (FEM), a non-governmental foundation advocating for the rights of women and girls.

== Political career ==
Caliva has been active in politics since she was 17 years old, and currently serves as in the directive committee of the Salta chapter of the Revolutionary Communist Party (legally registered as the "Party of Labour and the People").

At the 2019 general election, Caliva was the second candidate in the Frente de Todos list to the Argentine Chamber of Deputies in Salta Province, behind Lucas Godoy; the list received 46.08% of the popular vote and both Godoy and Caliva were elected. She was sworn in on 4 December 2019; she swore her oath "on Manuel Belgrano, on Martín Miguel de Güemes, on Juana Azurduy, on Otto Vargas, on René Salamanca, Clelia Iscaro, on Evita and El Che, on all of those who fight for land, roof and labour, on my sisters and brothers of the originary peoples of Salta, because it will be law, and we want ourselves alive and free".

In 2021, she was a candidate for the constitutional convention in Salta Province for the "Salta para Todos" list.
