= Soledad Carrizo =

Argentine politician (born 1977)

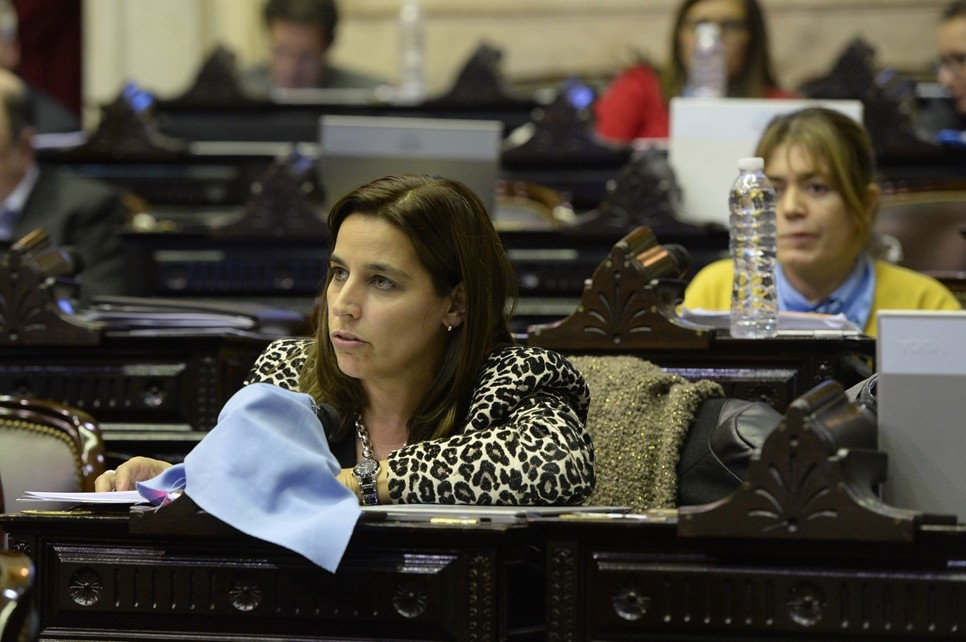

National Deputy
- Incumbent
- Assumed office 10 December 2013
- Constituency: Córdoba

Personal details
- Born: 21 April 1977 (age 49) Villa Quilino, Córdoba Province, Argentina
- Party: Radical Civic Union
- Other political affiliations: Juntos por el Cambio (2019–present)
- Education: Catholic University of Córdoba

María Soledad Carrizo (born 21 April 1977) is an Argentine politician, currently serving as National Deputy elected in Córdoba since 2013. She is a member of the Radical Civic Union (UCR). She was intendenta (mayor) of Quilino, a municipality in the Ischilín Department of Córdoba Province, from 2007 to 2013.

== Early life and career ==
Carrizo was born on 21 April 1977 in Quilino, a small town in the Ischilín Department of Córdoba Province. Carrizo's family has been politically active in the region for some generations; Carrizo's father, Alfredo Carrizo, was mayor of Quilino from 1983 to 1987. She studied law at the Catholic University of Córdoba, graduating in 2000, and has a notary title from the same university. She is married to Pablo Caparrós, and has two children.

Carrizo's first cousin, Carla Carrizo, currently serves as a national deputy representing the Federal Capital; both were elected in 2013.

== Political career ==
Carrizo became an affiliated UCR member in her youth, and served as secretary of the provincial UCR committee and vice president of the Radical mayors' forum. In 2007, when she was 30 years old, she was elected mayor of Quilino, becoming the first woman to hold the post. She was re-elected for a second term in 2011.

She ran for a seat in the Chamber of Deputies in the 2013 legislative election, as the second candidate in the Radical Civic Union list in Córdoba Province (behind Oscar Aguad). The list came second in the general election with 22.67% of the vote, and Carrizo was elected. Carrizo was re-elected in the 2017 legislative election, this time as part of the Cambiemos coalition; she was the second candidate in the list, behind Héctor Baldassi. The list was the most voted with 48.48% of the vote, and Carrizo was elected.

As a national deputy, Carrizo was an opponent of the legalization of abortion in Argentina. She voted against the two Voluntary Interruption of Pregnancy bills that were debated by the Argentine Congress in 2018 and 2020.

In 2019, she was elected third vice-president of the Provincial Committee of the Radical Civic Union in Córdoba.
