= Germana Figueroa Casas =

Argentine politician

Member of the Chamber of Deputies of Argentina
- Incumbent
- Assumed office 10 December 2021
- Constituency: Santa Fe

Personal details
- Born: 22 March 1967 (age 59)
- Party: Republican Proposal
- Occupation: Public Accountant

Germana Figueroa Casas (born 22 March 1967) is an Argentine politician who is a member of the Chamber of Deputies of Argentina.

== Biography ==
She worked as an accountant before she was elected in 2021.
