= Mario Leito =

Argentine politician

Member of the Chamber of Deputies of Argentina
- Incumbent
- Assumed office 10 December 2019
- Constituency: Tucuman

Personal details
- Born: 17 May 1964 (age 61)
- Party: Frente de Todos
- Occupation: Lawyer

Mario Leito is an Argentine politician who is a member of the Chamber of Deputies of Argentina.

== Biography ==
Leito was a lawyer before being elected in 2019
