= 2023 Argentine general election =

- Presidential election
- 22 October 2023 (first round); 19 November 2023 (second round)
- Opinion polls
- Registered: 35,854,122 (first round); 35,405,398 (second round)
- Turnout: 77.14% (first round) ▼3.27pp 76.32% (second round) ▼0.82pp
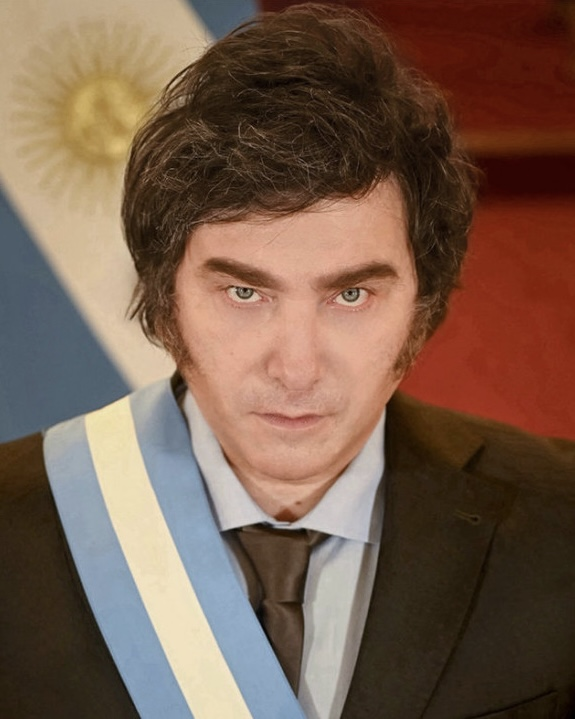

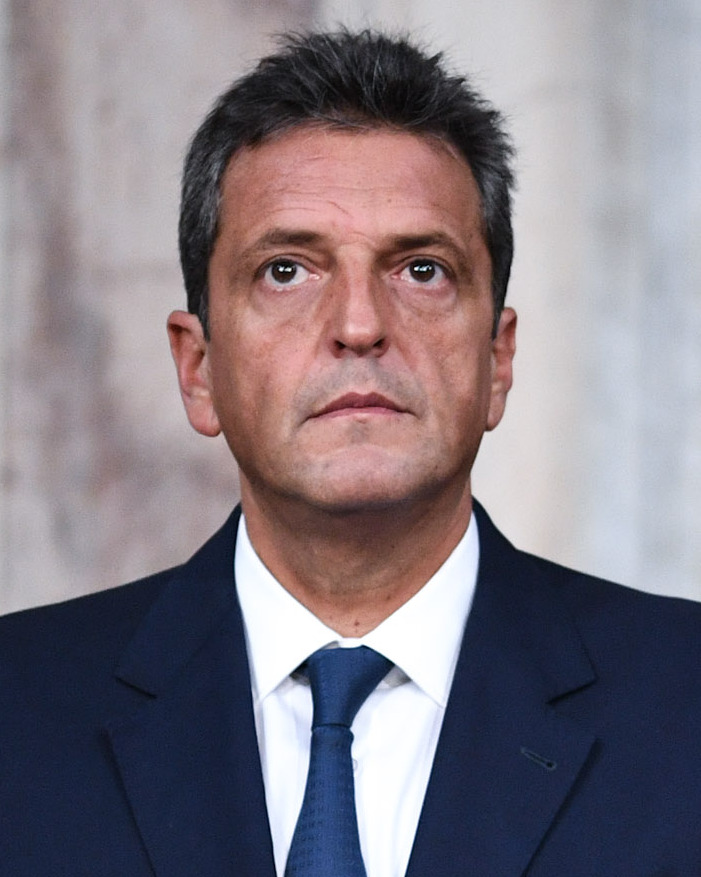
Nominee	Javier Milei	Sergio Massa
Party	PL	FR
Alliance	LLA	UxP
Running mate	Victoria Villarruel	Agustín Rossi
States carried	19 + CABA	4
Popular vote	14,554,560	11,598,720
Percentage	55.65%	44.35%
President before election
Alberto Fernández
FdT–PJ
Elected President
Javier Milei
LLA–PL
- Chamber of Deputies
- 22 October 2023
- 130 of the 257 seats in the Chamber of Deputies
- Turnout: 77.01%
Party	Leader	Vote %	Seats	+/–
UxP	Germán Martínez	38.54	58	−10
JxC	Mario Negri	26.60	31	−25
LLA	Javier Milei	26.51	35	New
Hacemos	Juan Schiaretti	3.99	4	0
FIT – Unidad	Nicolás del Caño	3.31	1	+1
Por Santa Cruz	Claudio Vidal	0.23	1	0
This lists parties that won seats. See the complete results below.
- Senate
- 22 October 2023
- 24 of the 72 seats in the Senate
- Turnout: 78.30%
Party	Leader	Vote %	Seats	+/–
UxP	José Mayans	43.66	13	+3
LLA	Javier Milei	25.93	7	New
JxC	Alfredo Cornejo	25.62	2	−9
Por Santa Cruz	Claudio Vidal	0.50	2	+1
This lists parties that won seats. See the complete results below.
Map showing the seats won by each party in each province.

General elections were held in Argentina on 22 October 2023 to elect the president, vice president, members of the National Congress, and the governors of most provinces. As no presidential candidate won a majority in the first round, a run-off was held on 19 November, in which Buenos Aires Deputy Javier Milei defeated Economy Minister Sergio Massa by 11% of the votes, to become President of Argentina. Incumbent president Alberto Fernández and incumbent vice president and former president Cristina Fernández de Kirchner, despite both being eligible for a second, consecutive term, did not seek re-election.

Advancing to the run-off, Massa of the ruling centre-left Union for the Homeland unexpectedly came in first place, winning 36% of the vote, against Milei of the right-wing Liberty Advances, who came in second place, with 30% of the vote. Massa's victory in the first round was seen as an upset because of the severe inflation that took place during Massa's tenure as economy minister, as well as Milei's lead in polls up to that point. In the run-off, Milei defeated Massa with 56% of the vote, the highest percentage of the vote since Argentina's transition to democracy. Milei received over 14 million votes, which was the highest-ever vote total in Argentina's history. In a surprise reversal of the first round, Milei outperformed polls, which had been predicting a much closer race. Massa conceded defeat shortly before the official results were published. Milei was inaugurated on 10 December.

Observers generally saw Milei's win as a sign more of discontent with the status quo than support for his politics, and his victory was likened to that of Donald Trump's 2016 victory in the United States and Jair Bolsonaro's 2018 victory in Brazil. Milei expressed support and admiration for both figures, and endorsed Trump in the 2024 United States presidential election.

== Background ==
In the 2019 general election, the Peronist, left-wing Frente de Todos ticket of Alberto Fernández, former Cabinet Chief, and Cristina Fernández de Kirchner, National Senator and former president, defeated the center-right Juntos por el Cambio ticket of incumbent president Mauricio Macri and conservative Peronist National Senator Miguel Ángel Pichetto, exceeding the threshold to win the presidency in a single round. Macri became the first incumbent president in Argentine history to be defeated for reelection.

The first two years of the Fernández presidency were limited by the COVID-19 pandemic in Argentina, during which he imposed strict lockdown measures in an attempt to suppress the spread of the disease, and a debt crisis. While the economy did recover in 2021–22, inflation rose to 100% (the highest since 1991). His approval ratings were low throughout his presidency, rarely cresting 50%, while disapproval ranged from 60% to 80%. In 2020, The Economist declared him "a president without a plan", and his presidency a "weak administration", alluding to his lack of independent decision-making and the admitted influence on him of Vice President and former President Cristina Fernández de Kirchner. The 2021 midterm elections resulted in heavy losses for the Frente de Todos, which lost its majority in both houses of Congress. Observers attributed the loss to widespread anger over high inflation and rising poverty.

In April 2023, Fernández announced that he had decided not to seek reelection to the presidency in the 2023 general election. Others who refused to run were incumbent vice president Cristina Fernández de Kirchner (who served as president between 2007 and 2015), and former president Mauricio Macri, who succeeded Fernández de Kirchner and preceded Fernández. Controversial constitutional amendments in Jujuy – a province governed by Gerardo Morales, who ran as a precandidate for vice president alongside Horacio Rodriguez Larreta– led to protests beginning in June where demonstrators stormed the Jujuy legislature.

The 2023 election was held amid a severe economic crisis with over 140% inflation and 40% poverty which observers said would negatively affect the ruling party's chance for another term.

== Debates ==
2023 Argentine presidential debates
Date	Time	Organizers	Location	P Present I Invitee N Non-invitee					
Date	Time	Organizers	Location	FR–UP	PL–LLA	PRO–JxC	PJ–HNP	PTS–FIT–U	Refs
1 October 2023	1 hour and 48 min.	Televisión Pública	Santiago del Estero Forum, Santiago del Estero City	P Sergio Massa	P Javier Milei	P Patricia Bullrich	P Juan Schiaretti	P Myriam Bregman	
8 October 2023	1 hour and 41 min.	Televisión Pública	Faculty of Law, University of Buenos Aires, Buenos Aires City	P Sergio Massa	P Javier Milei	P Patricia Bullrich	P Juan Schiaretti	P Myriam Bregman	
12 November 2023	1 hour and 58 min.	Televisión Pública	Faculty of Law, University of Buenos Aires, Buenos Aires City	P Sergio Massa	P Javier Milei				

2023 Argentine vice presidential debates
Date	Time	Organizer	Location	P Present I Invitee N Non-invitee					
Date	Time	Organizer	Location	PJ–UP	PD–LLA	UCR–JxC	HACER–HNP	PTS–FIT–U	Refs
20 September 2023	1 hour and 46 min.	Todo Noticias	Todo Noticias headquarters, Buenos Aires City	P Agustín Rossi	P Victoria Villarruel	P Luis Petri	P Florencio Randazzo	P Nicolas del Caño	
8 November 2023	1 hour and 17 min.	Todo Noticias	Todo Noticias headquarters, Buenos Aires City	P Agustín Rossi	P Victoria Villarruel				

== Electoral system ==
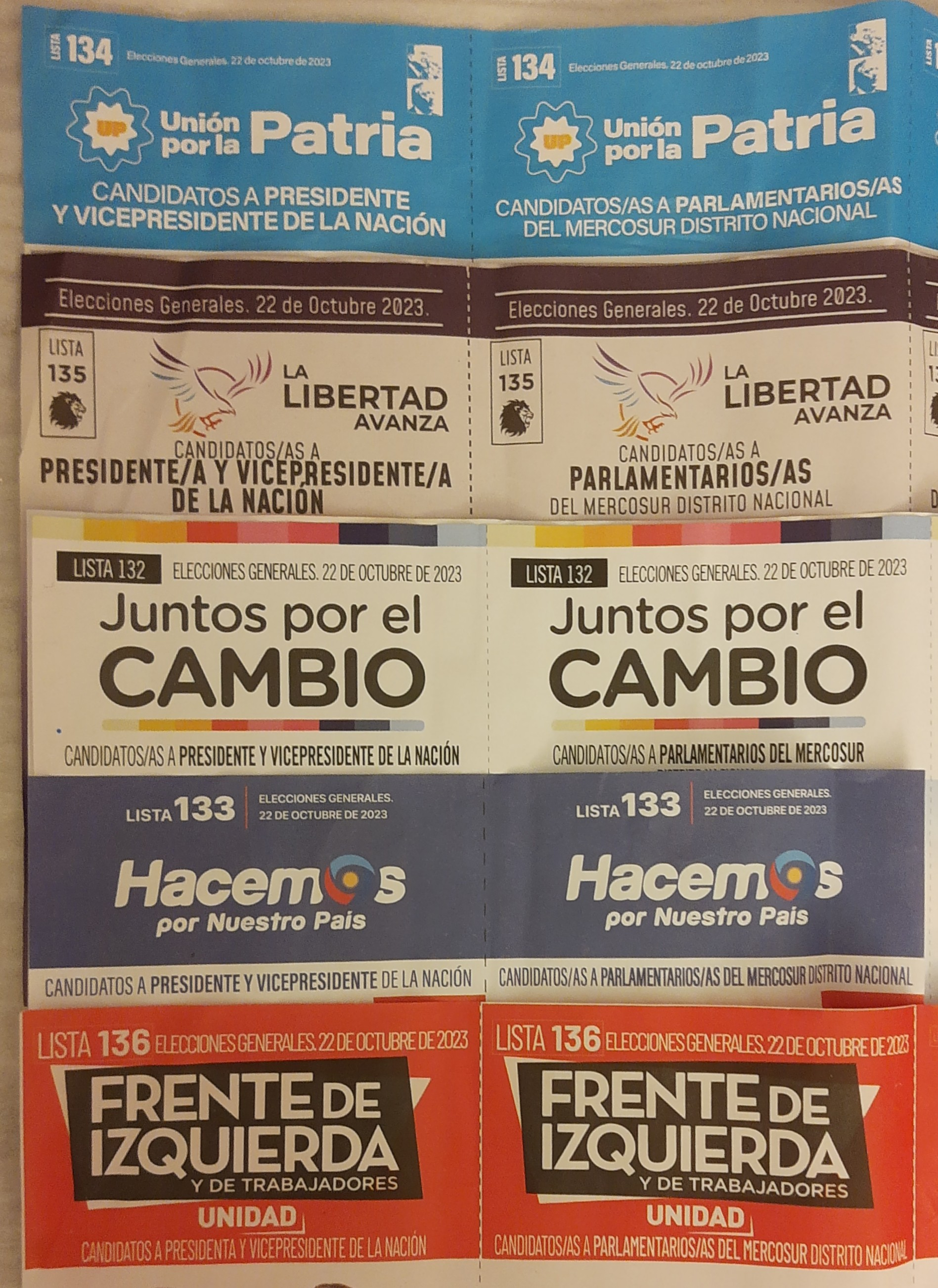
Ballots used for the 22 October general election.

=== President ===
The election of the president is conducted under the ballotage system, a modified version of the two-round system. A candidate can win the presidency in a single round by either winning over 45% of the vote or if they win 40% of the vote while finishing more than 10 percentage points ahead of the second-place candidate. If no candidate meets either threshold, a runoff takes place between the top two candidates. Voting is compulsory for citizens between 18 and 70 years old. Suffrage is also extended to 16- and 17-year-olds, though without compulsory voting. Both in the primaries and in the first and second rounds polls opened at 08:00 and closed at 18:00 (UTC −3), with vote results starting to show at around 21:00.

=== Congress ===
==== Chamber of Deputies ====
The 257 members of the Chamber of Deputies are elected by proportional representation in 24 multi-member constituencies based on the provinces (plus the City of Buenos Aires). Seats are allocated using the d'Hondt method with a 3% electoral threshold. In this election, 130 of the 257 seats were up for renewal for a four-year term.

Province	Total seats	Seats at stake
Buenos Aires	70	35
Buenos Aires City	25	12
Catamarca	5	2
Chaco	7	3
Chubut	5	3
Córdoba	18	9
Corrientes	7	4
Entre Ríos	9	4
Formosa	5	3
Jujuy	6	3
La Pampa	5	2
La Rioja	5	3
Mendoza	10	5
Misiones	7	4
Neuquén	5	2
Río Negro	5	3
Salta	7	4
San Juan	6	3
San Luis	5	2
Santa Cruz	5	2
Santa Fe	19	10
Santiago del Estero	7	4
Tierra del Fuego	5	3
Tucumán	9	5
Total	257	130

Outgoing deputies
Province	Deputy	Party
Buenos Aires	Juan Carlos Alderete	Unión por la Patria
Buenos Aires	Alicia Noemí Aparicio	Unión por la Patria
Buenos Aires	Alberto Asseff	PRO
Buenos Aires	Karina Banfi	UCR
Buenos Aires	Miguel Ángel Bazze	UCR
Buenos Aires	Lisandro Bormioli	Unión por la Patria
Buenos Aires	Graciela Camaño	Bonaerense Identity
Buenos Aires	Camila Crescimbeni	PRO
Buenos Aires	Federico Fagioli	Unión por la Patria
Buenos Aires	Mónica Frade	Civic Coalition
Buenos Aires	Raúl Sebastián García De Luca	Federal Encounter
Buenos Aires	Leonardo Grosso	Unión por la Patria
Buenos Aires	Ramiro Gutiérrez	Unión por la Patria
Buenos Aires	María de las Mercedes Joury	PRO
Buenos Aires	Máximo Carlos Kirchner	Unión por la Patria
Buenos Aires	Florencia Lampreabe	Unión por la Patria
Buenos Aires	María Jimena López	Unión por la Patria
Buenos Aires	Silvia Gabriela Lospennato	PRO
Buenos Aires	María Rosa Martínez	Unión por la Patria
Buenos Aires	Cecilia Moreau	Unión por la Patria
Buenos Aires	Claudia Beatriz Ormachea	Unión por la Patria
Buenos Aires	María Luján Rey	PRO
Buenos Aires	Cristian Adrián Ritondo	PRO
Buenos Aires	Alejandro "Topo" Rodríguez	Bonaerense Identity
Buenos Aires	Carlos Américo Selva	Unión por la Patria
Buenos Aires	Natalia Marcela Souto	Unión por la Patria
Buenos Aires	Mariana Stilman	Civic Coalition
Buenos Aires	Luis Rodolfo Tailhade	Unión por la Patria
Buenos Aires	Pablo Torello	PRO
Buenos Aires	Waldo Ezequiel Wolff	PRO
Buenos Aires	Liliana Patricia Yambrún	Unión por la Patria
Buenos Aires	Lucio Yapor	Unión por la Patria
Buenos Aires	Natalia Zaracho	Unión por la Patria
Buenos Aires City	Mara Brawer	Unión por la Patria
Buenos Aires City	Maximiliano Carlos Francisco Ferraro	Civic Coalition
Buenos Aires City	Álvaro Gustavo González	PRO
Buenos Aires City	Itai Hagman	Unión por la Patria
Buenos Aires City	María Dolores Martínez	Radical Evolution
Buenos Aires City	Victoria Morales Gorleri	PRO
Buenos Aires City	Paula Andrea Penacca	Unión por la Patria
Buenos Aires City	Dina Esther Rezinovsky	PRO
Buenos Aires City	Pablo Gabriel Tonelli	PRO
Buenos Aires City	Eduardo Félix Valdés	Unión por la Patria
Buenos Aires City	Emiliano Benjamín Yacobitti	Radical Evolution
Buenos Aires City	Mariana de Jesús Zuvic	Civic Coalition
Catamarca	Anahí Costa	Unión por la Patria
Catamarca	Rubén Manzi	Civic Coalition
Chaco	Gerardo Cipolini	Radical Evolution
Chaco	Aldo Adolfo Leiva	Unión por la Patria
Chaco	María Lucila Masin	Unión por la Patria
Chubut	Estela Beatriz Hernández	Unión por la Patria
Chubut	Santiago Nicolás Igon	Unión por la Patria
Chubut	Matías Taccetta	PRO
Córdoba	Soher El Sukaria	PRO
Córdoba	Gabriela Beatriz Estévez	Unión por la Patria
Córdoba	Eduardo Gabriel Fernández	Unión por la Patria
Córdoba	Carlos Mario Gutiérrez	Federal Córdoba
Córdoba	Marcos Carasso	UCR
Córdoba	Leonor María Martínez Villada	Civic Coalition
Córdoba	Mario Raúl Negri	UCR
Córdoba	Víctor Hugo Romero	UCR
Córdoba	Adriana Noemí Ruarte	PRO
Corrientes	Fabián Borda	Unión por la Patria
Corrientes	Ingrid Jetter	PRO
Corrientes	Nancy Aracely Sand Giorasi	Unión por la Patria
Corrientes	Jorge Vara	UCR
Entre Ríos	Marcelo Pablo Casaretto	Unión por la Patria
Entre Ríos	Gustavo René Hein	PRO
Entre Ríos	Gabriela Mabel Lena	UCR
Entre Ríos	Blanca Inés Osuna	Unión por la Patria
Formosa	Ricardo Buryaile	UCR
Formosa	Nelly Ramona Daldovo	Unión por la Patria
Formosa	María Graciela Parola	Unión por la Patria
Jujuy	Daniel Julio Ferreyra	Unión por la Patria
Jujuy	María Carolina Moisés	Unión por la Patria
Jujuy	Jorge Raúl Rizzotti	UCR
La Pampa	Martín Antonio Berhongaray	UCR
La Pampa	Hernán Pérez Araujo	Unión por la Patria
La Rioja	Hilda Clelia Aguirre de Soria	Unión por la Patria
La Rioja	Diego Felipe Álvarez	SER – We Are Energy to Renovate
Mendoza	Omar Bruno De Marchi	PRO
Mendoza	Lisandro Nieri	UCR
Mendoza	Jimena Latorre	UCR
Mendoza	Eber Albano Pérez Plaza	Unión por la Patria
Mendoza	Marisa Lourdes Uceda	Unión por la Patria
Misiones	Héctor Orlando "Cacho" Bárbaro	Unión por la Patria
Misiones	María Cristina Brítez	Unión por la Patria
Misiones	Diego Horacio Sartori	Misiones Front for Concord
Misiones	Alfredo Oscar Schiavoni	PRO
Neuquén	Guillermo Oscar Carnaghi	Unión por la Patria
Neuquén	Francisco Sánchez	PRO
Neuquén	Pedro Cristian Dantas	Unión por la Patria
Río Negro	Luis Di Giacomo	Together We Are Río Negro
Río Negro	Susana Graciela Landriscini	Unión por la Patria
Salta	Lía Verónica Caliva	Unión por la Patria
Salta	Virginia María Cornejo	PRO
Salta	Lucas Javier Godoy	Unión por la Patria
Salta	Miguel Nanni Valero	UCR
San Juan	Graciela María Caselles	Unión por la Patria
San Juan	José Luis Gioja	Unión por la Patria
San Juan	Humberto Marcelo Orrego	Production and Labour
San Luis	Alejandro Cacace	Radical Evolution
San Luis	Carlos Ybrhain Ponce	Unión por la Patria
Santa Cruz	Jorge Guillermo Verón	Unión por la Patria
Santa Cruz	Marcela Paola Vessvessian	Unión por la Patria
Santa Fe	Federico Angelini	PRO
Santa Fe	Laura Carolina Castets	Civic Coalition
Santa Fe	Marcos Cleri	Unión por la Patria
Santa Fe	Enrique Eloy Estévez	Socialist Party
Santa Fe	Ximena García	UCR
Santa Fe	Juan Martín	UCR
Santa Fe	Germán Pedro Martínez	Unión por la Patria
Santa Fe	Vanesa Massetani	Unión por la Patria
Santa Fe	José Carlos Núñez	PRO
Santa Fe	Alejandra del Huerto Obeid	Unión por la Patria
Santiago del Estero	Daniel Agustín Brue	Unión por la Patria
Santiago del Estero	Ricardo Daniel Daives	Unión por la Patria
Santiago del Estero	Graciela Navarro	Unión por la Patria
Santiago del Estero	Estela Mary Neder	Unión por la Patria
Tierra del Fuego	Rosana Andrea Bertone	Unión por la Patria
Tierra del Fuego	Mabel Luisa Caparrós	Unión por la Patria
Tierra del Fuego	Federico Frigerio	PRO
Tucumán	Domingo Luis Amaya	Federal Encounter
Tucumán	Lidia Inés Ascárate	UCR
Tucumán	Nilda Mabel Carrizo	Unión por la Patria
Tucumán	Carlos Aníbal Cisneros	Unión por la Patria
Tucumán	Mario Alberto Leito	Unión por la Patria

==== Senate ====
The 72 members of the Senate are elected in the same 24 constituencies, with three seats in each. The party receiving the most votes in each constituency wins two seats, with the third seat awarded to the second-placed party. The 2023 elections will see one-third of senators renewed, with eight provinces electing three senators for a 6-year term; Buenos Aires, Formosa, Jujuy, La Rioja, Misiones, San Juan, San Luis, and Santa Cruz.

Outgoing senators
Province	Senator	Party
Buenos Aires	José María Torello	PRO
Buenos Aires	Gladys González	PRO
Buenos Aires	Juliana Di Tullio	Unión por la Patria
Formosa	María Teresa Margarita González	Unión por la Patria
Formosa	José Miguel Ángel Mayans	Unión por la Patria
Formosa	Luis Carlos Petcoff Naidenoff	Unión por la Patria
Jujuy	Mario Raymundo Fiad	Radical Civic Union
Jujuy	Silvia del Rosario Giacoppo	Radical Civic Union
Jujuy	Guillermo Eugenio Mario Snopek	Unión por la Patria
La Rioja	Ricardo Antonio Guerra	Unión por la Patria
La Rioja	Julio César Martínez	Radical Civic Union
La Rioja	María Clara del Valle Vega	We Have a Future Argentina
Misiones	Maurice Fabián Closs	Unión por la Patria
Misiones	Humberto Luis Arturo Schiavoni	PRO
Misiones	Magdalena Solari Quintana	Misiones
San Juan	Roberto Gustavo Basualdo	Production and Labour
San Juan	Cristina del Carmen López Valverde	Unión por la Patria
San Juan	José Rubén Uñac	Unión por la Patria
San Luis	María Eugenia Catalfamo	Unión por la Patria
San Luis	Gabriela González Riollo	PRO
San Luis	Adolfo Rodríguez Saá	Unión por la Patria
Santa Cruz	Eduardo Raúl Costa	Radical Civic Union
Santa Cruz	Ana María Ianni	Unión por la Patria
Santa Cruz	María Belén Tapia	Radical Civic Union

== Presidential candidates ==
The following candidates participated in the Open, Simultaneous and Mandatory Primaries (PASO), which were held on 13 August 2023. The primaries determined the candidates of each coalition. Coalitions who received less than 1.5% of the votes will not be able to participate in the general election on 22 October.

=== Advanced to runoff election ===
Name Birth date and place	Prior experience	Party	Vice President	Coalition	Ref
Sergio Massa b. 1972 (age 54); San Martín, Buenos Aires Province	Minister of Economy (2022–2023) See more: President of the Chamber of Deputies (2019–2022); National Deputy from Buenos Aires Province (2013–2017; 2019–2022); Mayor of Tigre (2007–2008; 2009–2013); Chief of the Cabinet of Ministers (2008–2009); Executive Director of ANSES (2002–2007); Provincial Deputy of Buenos Aires (1999–2002); 2015 presidential candidate under the United for a New Alternative coalition	Renewal Front	Cabinet Chief; Agustín Rossi (PJ)	Union for the Homeland Member parties: Justicialist Party; Renewal Front; Evita Movement; Broad Front; Victory Party; Kolina; New Encounter; FORJA Concertation Party; Patria Grande Front; Solidary Party; Federal Party; Intransigent Party; Communist Party; Popular Unity; Party of Culture, Education and Labour; Revolutionary Communist Party; Party of Labour and Equity	
Javier Milei b. 1970 (age 56); Buenos Aires	National Deputy from the City of Buenos Aires (2021–2023)	Libertarian Party	National Deputy; Victoria Villarruel (PD)	Liberty Advances Member parties: National Democratic Party; Democratic Party Integration and Development Movement (Factions); Republican Force Federal Renewal Party; Renewal Crusade; Unite for Freedom and Dignity; Neighborhood Confederation of Entre Ríos; Pensioners and Youth Movement	

=== Defeated in the first round ===
Name Birth date and place	Prior experience	Party	Vice President	Coalition	Ref
Patricia Bullrich b. 1956 (age 70); Buenos Aires	Minister of Security (2015–2019) See more: National Deputy from the City of Buenos Aires (1993–1997; 2007–2015); Minister of Social Security (October–November 2001); Minister of Labour, Employment and Human Resources (2000–2001)	Republican Proposal	Former; National Deputy; Luis Petri (UCR)	Together for Change Member parties: Republican Proposal; Radical Civic Union; Civic Coalition ARI; Generation for a National Encounter; UNIR Constitutional Nationalist Party; Democratic Progressive Party; Federal Republican Encounter	
Juan Schiaretti b. 1949 (age 77); Córdoba, Córdoba Province	Governor of Córdoba Province (2007–2011; 2015–2023) See more: Vice Governor of Córdoba Province (2003–2007); Federal Interventor of Santiago del Estero Province (1993–1995)	Justicialist Party	National Deputy; Florencio Randazzo (HACER)	We Do for Our Country Member parties: Socialist Party; Christian Democratic Party; Autonomist Party	
Myriam Bregman b. 1972 (age 54); Timote, Buenos Aires Province	National Deputy from Buenos Aires Province (2015–2016) and the City of Buenos Aires (2021–present) See more: Legislator of Buenos Aires City (2017–2021); 2015 vice presidential candidate under the Workers' Left Front coalition	Socialist Workers' Party	National Deputy; Nicolás del Caño (PTS)	Workers' Left Front – Unity Member parties: Workers' Party; Socialist Workers' Party; Socialist Left; Socialist Workers' Movement	

=== Defeated in primary elections, but party advanced ===
Name Birth date and place	Prior experience	Party	Vice President	Coalition	Ref
Juan Grabois b. 1983 (age 43); San Isidro, Buenos Aires Province	Leader of the Patria Grande Front	Patria Grande Front	Doctor; Paula Abal Medina (FPG)	Union for the Homeland Member parties: Justicialist Party; Renewal Front; Evita Movement; Broad Front; Victory Party; Kolina; New Encounter; FORJA Concertation Party; Patria Grande Front; Solidary Party; Federal Party; Intransigent Party; Communist Party; Popular Unity; Party of Culture, Education and Labour; Revolutionary Communist Party; Party of Labour and Equity	
Horacio Rodríguez Larreta b. 1965 (age 60); Buenos Aires	Mayor of Buenos Aires (2015–2023) See more: Chief of the Cabinet of Ministers of Buenos Aires (2007–2015)	Republican Proposal	Governor of Jujuy; Gerardo Morales (UCR)	Together for Change Member parties: Republican Proposal; Radical Civic Union; Civic Coalition ARI; Generation for a National Encounter; UNIR Constitutional Nationalist Party; Democratic Progressive Party; Federal Republican Encounter	
Gabriel Solano b. 1974 (age 52); Buenos Aires	Legislator of Buenos Aires City (2017–2020; 2021–present) See more: president of the Workers' Party (2019–present)	Workers' Party	Former Legislator of Buenos Aires City; Vilma Ripoll (MST)	Workers' Left Front – Unity Member parties: Workers' Party; Socialist Workers' Party; Socialist Left; Socialist Workers' Movement	

=== Defeated in primary elections, party did not advance ===
Name Birth date and place	Prior experience	Party	Vice President	Coalition	Ref
Guillermo Moreno b. 1955 (age 71); Buenos Aires	Secretary of Domestic Trade (2006–2013) See more: Under-Secretary of Production for the City of Buenos Aires (1990–1993)	Principles and Values Party	Secretary General of APOPS; Leonardo Fabre (PyV)	Principles and Values Member parties: People's Party; Principles and Values	
Paula Arias	–	Labour Party	Walter Vera (PL)	Principles and Values Member parties: People's Party; Principles and Values	
Carina Bartolini	–	Justicialist Party	Mabel Gómez (PJ)	Principles and Values Member parties: People's Party; Principles and Values	
Eliodoro Martínez	Leader of the CABA wing of the Action for the Republic	Action for the Republic	Vicente Souto (APLR)	Principles and Values Member parties: People's Party; Principles and Values	
Jorge Oliver	Journalist and political analist	Three Flags group	Ezequiel San Martín (Three Flags)	Principles and Values Member parties: People's Party; Principles and Values	
Manuela Castañeira b. 1984 (age 41); Paraná, Entre Ríos Province	Sociologist	New MAS	Teacher; Lucas Ruiz (New MAS)	New MAS	
Jesús Escobar b. 1971 (age 55); El Maitén, Chubut Province	Provincial Legislator of Neuquén (2003–2007; 2011–2019)	Freemen of the South	Former Santiago del Estero City councilwoman Marianella Lezama Hid (Freemen of the South)	Freemen of the South Movement	
Marcelo Ramal b. 1954 (age 72); Buenos Aires	Legislator of Buenos Aires City (2013–2015; 2015–2017)	Workers' Policy	Teacher; Patricia Urones (PO)	Workers' Policy	
Nazareno Etchepare	Lawyer	Demos	Bachelor; Fernando Lorenzo (DEMOS)	Liber.AR Member parties: Unite for Liberty and Dignity; Liber.AR	
Ramiro Vasena	Political leader	Reconquest Group	Political leader Víctor Aníbal Lagonegro (Reconquest)	Liber.AR Member parties: Unite for Liberty and Dignity; Liber.AR	
Raúl Castells b. 1953 (age 72); Rosario, Santa Fe Province	Leader of the MIJD	MIJD	Social activist Adriana Reinoso (MIJD)	MIJD	
Santiago Cúneo b. 1970 (age 56); Buenos Aires	Journalist and businessman	MIJD	Falklands War veteran Gustavo Barranco (MIJD)	MIJD	
Mempo Giardinelli b. 1947 (age 79); Resistencia, Chaco Province	Writer, journalist and professor	Peace, Democracy and Sovereignty	Teacher; Bárbara Solemou (PDyS)	Youth Project Member parties: Humanist Party; Youth Project Party; National Liberation Movement; Popular Consensus; United for the South; The Argentine Manifesto	
Reina Ibáñez	Sex worker	TODEX	Gonzalo Ibarra (TODEX)	Youth Project Member parties: Humanist Party; Youth Project Party; National Liberation Movement; Popular Consensus; United for the South; The Argentine Manifesto	
Martín Ayerbe	President of the Argentine Naval Forum Hipólito Bouchard	United Homeland	Hugo Rodríguez (United Homeland)	Youth Project Member parties: Humanist Party; Youth Project Party; National Liberation Movement; Popular Consensus; United for the South; The Argentine Manifesto	
César Biondini	Lawyer	Patriot Front	Teacher; Mariel Avendaño (FP)	Patriot Front	
Raúl Albarracín	Provincial Legislator of Córdoba (2007–2011)	Neighbourhood Action Movement	Lawyer; Sergio Pastore (MAV)	Neighbourhood Action Movement	
Andrés Passamonti	Leader of the UCEDE (Buenos Aires)	Union of the Democratic Centre	Public accountant Pamela Fernández (UCEDE)	Union of the Democratic Centre	

== Endorsements ==
Javier Milei

Former executive officials

- Mauricio Macri, former President of Argentina (2015–2019)

Former cabinet officials

- Patricia Bullrich, former Ministry of National Security (2015–2019)

National deputies

- José Luis Espert, member for Buenos Aires (since 2021)
- Luis Petri, former member for Mendoza (2013–2021)

Individuals

- Andrés Calamaro, Argentine singer
- Agustín Laje, Argentine conservative writer and activist
- Juan Manuel Martínez, Argentine footballer
- José Luis Chilavert, Paraguayan footballer
- Mario Vargas Llosa, Spanish-Peruvian writer, politician, and Nobel Prize winner

International politicians

Head of states and government

- Andrés Pastrana, former President of Colombia (1998–2002)
- Felipe Calderón, former President of Mexico (2006–2012)
- Iván Duque, former President of Colombia (2018–2022)
- Jair Bolsonaro, former President of Brazil (2019–2023)
- Jorge Quiroga, former President of Bolivia (2001–2002)
- Sebastián Piñera, former President of Chile (2010–2014, 2018–2022)
- Mariano Rajoy, former Prime Minister of Spain (2011–2018)
- Luis Fortuño, former Governor of Puerto Rico (2009–2013)
- Vicente Fox, former President of Mexico (2000–2006)

Members of national and supranational parliaments

- Eduardo Bolsonaro, member of the Chamber of Deputies of Brazil, and son of Brazilian President Jair Bolsonaro
- José Antonio Kast, member of the Chamber of Deputies of Chile from District 30 (2002–2014) and District 24 (2014–2018)

== Results ==
=== President ===
Candidate	Running mate	Party	First round		Second round	
Candidate	Running mate	Party	Votes	%	Votes	%
Sergio Massa	Agustín Rossi	Union for the Homeland	9,853,492	36.78	11,598,720	44.35
Javier Milei	Victoria Villarruel	Freedom Advances	8,034,990	29.99	14,554,560	55.65
Patricia Bullrich	Luis Petri	Together for Change	6,379,023	23.81		
Juan Schiaretti	Florencio Randazzo	We Do for Our Country	1,802,068	6.73		
Myriam Bregman	Nicolás del Caño	Workers' Left Front	722,061	2.70		
Total			26,791,634	100.00	26,153,280	100.00
Valid votes			26,791,634	96.86	26,153,280	96.79
Invalid votes			451,486	1.63	450,746	1.67
Blank votes			415,737	1.50	417,574	1.55
Total votes			27,658,857	100.00	27,021,600	100.00
Registered voters/turnout			35,854,122	77.14	35,405,398	76.32

==== Results by province, first round ====
Provinces won by Massa/Rossi
Provinces won by Milei/Villarruel
Provinces won by Bullrich/Petri

Province	Massa/Rossi (UP)		Milei/Villarruel (LLA)		Bullrich/Petri (JxC)		Schiaretti/Randazzo (HxNP)		Bregman/Del Caño (FIT-U)		Blanks/Invalid		Turnout	
Province	Votes	%	Votes	%	Votes	%	Votes	%	Votes	%	Votes	%	Votes	%
Buenos Aires	4,327,441	42.95	2,593,075	25.73	2,423,384	24.05	373,087	3.70	359,538	3.57	348,389	3.34	10,424,914	78.61
Buenos Aires City	616,182	32.18	382,488	19.98	789,454	41.23	58,788	3.07	67,666	3.53	49,056	2.50	1,963,634	72.97
Catamarca	104,322	42.83	78,017	32.03	41,719	17.13	15,677	6.44	3,841	1.58	20,616	7.80	264,192	77.42
Chaco	313,941	43.67	200,006	27.82	173,253	24.10	26,059	3.62	5,637	0.78	12,023	1.64	730,919	72.95
Chubut	111,752	32.22	121,842	35.13	71,343	20.57	26,722	7.70	15,187	4.38	10,193	2.85	357,039	74.83
Córdoba	309,044	13.42	773,428	33.58	521,310	22.63	667,447	28.98	31,922	1.39	37,952	1.62	2,341,103	75.73
Corrientes	262,170	37.21	189,282	26.87	226,371	32.13	19,215	2.73	7,464	1.06	17,980	2.49	722,482	77.40
Entre Ríos	283,136	33.31	252,719	29.74	255,236	30.03	45,540	5.36	13,248	1.56	49,758	5.53	899,637	78.16
Formosa	189,593	52.31	105,330	29.06	55,738	15.38	8,843	2.44	2,954	0.81	6,945	1.88	369,403	76.01
Jujuy	148,103	32.36	170,966	37.35	91,373	19.96	31,063	6.79	16,193	3.54	11,240	2.40	468,938	79.04
La Pampa	80,611	34.86	77,493	33.51	50,640	21.90	17,195	7.44	5,292	2.29	4,319	1.83	235,550	78.15
La Rioja	98,739	41.14	90,328	37.63	28,314	11.80	20,416	8.51	2,219	0.92	5,560	2.26	245,576	80.53
Mendoza	269,326	24.01	475,272	42.38	289,533	25.82	48,472	4.32	38,932	3.47	34,999	3.03	1,156,534	75.84
Misiones	277,836	37.93	309,077	42.19	105,384	14.39	30,036	4.10	10,228	1.40	25,033	3.30	757,594	76.07
Neuquén	135,881	31.76	157,187	36.74	87,952	20.56	25,438	5.95	21,356	4.99	19,450	4.35	447,264	80.33
Río Negro	168,235	37.85	150,079	33.76	80,591	18.13	27,782	6.25	17,847	4.01	20,523	4.41	465,057	77.54
Salta	304,880	38.00	323,105	40.27	110,702	13.80	49,587	6.18	14,014	1.75	25,419	3.07	827,707	75.49
San Juan	155,794	33.30	164,117	35.08	108,547	23.20	28,879	6.17	10,455	2.23	11,800	2.46	479,592	78.43
San Luis	88,235	27.33	139,894	43.33	67,517	20.91	20,159	6.24	7,055	2.19	9,934	2.99	332,794	78.69
Santa Cruz	67,336	37.79	64,687	36.30	29,234	16.41	11,757	6.60	5,161	2.90	15,058	7.79	193,233	72.41
Santa Fe	607,088	29.70	664,607	32.52	549,363	26.88	184,337	9.02	38,550	1.89	44,420	2.13	2,088,365	73.14
Santiago del Estero	416,597	65.77	144,659	22.84	50,749	8.01	13,489	2.13	7,912	1.25	13,315	2.06	646,721	79.29
Tierra del Fuego	40,889	38.20	36,202	33.82	16,043	14.99	9,767	9.12	4,137	3.86	3,363	3.05	110,401	74.16
Tucumán	476,361	44.93	371,130	35.00	155,273	14.64	42,313	3.99	15,253	1.44	34,941	3.19	1,095,271	82.65
Total	9,853,492	36.78	8,034,990	29.99	6,379,023	23.81	1,802,068	6.73	722,061	2.70	832,286	3.01	27,623,920	77.05

==== Results by province, second round ====
Provinces won by Massa/Rossi
Provinces won by Milei/Villarruel

Province	Milei/Villarruel (LLA)		Massa/Rossi (UP)		Margin		Blanks/Invalid		Turnout	
Province	Votes	%	Votes	%	Votes	%	Votes	%	Votes	%
Buenos Aires	4,801,185	49.24	4,949,734	50.76	148,549	1.52	322,872	3.21	10,073,791	76.78
Buenos Aires City	1,038,310	57.25	775,356	42.75	262,954	14.50	91,959	4.83	1,905,625	75.42
Catamarca	125,325	52.81	111,994	47.19	13,331	5.62	5,930	2.44	243,249	71.40
Chaco	357,106	49.81	359,789	50.19	2,683	0.37	13,369	1.83	730,264	73.10
Chubut	197,835	59.07	137,057	40.93	60,778	18.15	15,565	4.44	350,457	73.85
Córdoba	1,639,102	74.05	574,313	25.95	1,064,789	48.11	84,981	3.70	2,298,396	75.09
Corrientes	366,228	53.16	322,694	46.84	43,534	6.32	16,667	2.36	705,589	75.85
Entre Ríos	529,318	61.47	331,763	38.53	197,555	22.94	28,698	3.23	889,779	77.76
Formosa	154,306	43.27	202,288	56.73	47,982	13.46	6,389	1.76	362,983	75.23
Jujuy	258,754	58.14	186,315	41.86	72,439	16.28	11,845	2.59	456,914	77.32
La Pampa	126,794	57.28	94,546	42.72	32,248	14.57	7,683	3.35	229,023	76.33
La Rioja	126,357	53.73	108,817	46.27	17,540	7.46	4,990	2.08	240,164	78.89
Mendoza	784,109	71.17	317,656	28.83	466,453	42.34	41,636	3.64	1,143,401	76.49
Misiones	405,460	56.72	309,355	43.28	96,105	13.44	14,889	2.04	729,704	73.74
Neuquén	254,613	60.43	166,700	39.57	87,913	20.87	19,041	4.32	440,354	79.48
Río Negro	236,796	54.22	199,969	45.78	36,827	8.43	17,708	3.90	454,473	76.26
Salta	461,685	57.67	338,925	42.33	122,760	15.33	18,672	2.28	819,282	75.04
San Juan	277,621	60.71	179,706	39.29	97,915	21.41	13,027	2.77	470,354	77.43
San Luis	214,938	67.98	101,232	32.02	113,706	35.96	10,593	3.24	326,763	77.61
Santa Cruz	104,531	58.00	75,706	42.00	28,825	15.99	6,014	3.23	186,251	70.07
Santa Fe	1,282,012	62.83	758,396	37.17	523,616	25.66	80,137	3.78	2,120,545	74.96
Santiago del Estero	198,805	31.49	432,433	68.51	233,628	37.01	9,343	1.46	640,581	78.68
Tierra del Fuego	55,975	53.32	48,998	46.68	6,977	6.65	4,636	4.23	109,609	74.07
Tucumán	557,395	51.98	514,978	48.02	42,417	3.96	21,676	1.98	1,094,049	82.91
Total	14,554,560	55.65	11,598,720	44.35	2,955,840	11.30	868,320	3.21	27,021,600	76.32

=== Chamber of Deputies ===
Party or alliance		Votes	%	Seats
Union for the Homeland	Union for the Homeland	8,252,357	33.62	48
Union for the Homeland	Civic Front for Santiago	378,246	1.54	4
Union for the Homeland	Más para Entre Ríos	293,605	1.20	2
Union for the Homeland	Front for the Renewal of Concord	252,335	1.03	3
Union for the Homeland	Unión por San Luis	83,178	0.34	1
Union for the Homeland	Renewal Front	38,770	0.16	0
Union for the Homeland	Total	9,298,491	37.88	58
La Libertad Avanza	La Libertad Avanza	5,804,502	23.65	28
La Libertad Avanza	Ahora Patria	305,397	1.24	2
La Libertad Avanza	Republican Force	286,594	1.17	1
La Libertad Avanza	Federal Renewal Party	152,853	0.62	1
La Libertad Avanza	Arriba Neuquén	136,290	0.56	1
La Libertad Avanza	Faith Party	126,879	0.52	1
La Libertad Avanza	Republicanos Unidos	30,534	0.12	1
La Libertad Avanza	Total	6,843,049	27.88	35
Juntos por el Cambio	Juntos por el Cambio	5,519,165	22.48	27
Juntos por el Cambio	Cambia Mendoza	287,020	1.17	1
Juntos por el Cambio	Juntos por Entre Ríos	269,189	1.10	1
Juntos por el Cambio	ECO–Vamos Corrientes	222,006	0.90	1
Juntos por el Cambio	Cambia Jujuy	96,158	0.39	1
Juntos por el Cambio	Cambia Santa Cruz	18,595	0.08	0
Juntos por el Cambio	Total	6,412,133	26.12	31
Hacemos por Nuestro País	Hacemos por Nuestro País	687,511	2.80	3
Hacemos por Nuestro País	La Fuerza de Santa Fe	184,680	0.75	1
Hacemos por Nuestro País	Partido Autonomista	40,723	0.17	0
Hacemos por Nuestro País	Christian Democratic Party	17,603	0.07	0
Hacemos por Nuestro País	Unity and Liberty Party	16,323	0.07	0
Hacemos por Nuestro País	Total	946,840	3.86	4
Workers' Left Front		798,396	3.25	1
Together We Are Río Negro		60,259	0.25	0
Por Santa Cruz		55,430	0.23	1
Freemen of the South Movement		42,085	0.17	0
Neuquén People's Movement		30,649	0.12	0
Agrarian and Social Party		26,776	0.11	0
Salta Independiente		22,818	0.09	0
Somos Fueguinos		9,935	0.04	0
Total		24,546,861	100.00	130
Valid votes		24,546,861	88.90	
Invalid votes		220,717	0.80	
Blank votes		2,845,161	10.30	
Total votes		27,612,739	100.00	
Registered voters/turnout		35,854,122	77.01	

==== Results by province ====
Province	Union for the Homeland			La Libertad Avanza			Juntos por el Cambio			Hacemos por Nuestro País			Others		
Province	Votes	%	Seats	Votes	%	Seats	Votes	%	Seats	Votes	%	Seats	Votes	%	Seats
Buenos Aires	4,094,665	43.71	16	2,382,198	25.43	9	2,484,593	26.52	9	—	—	—	405,973	4.33	1
Buenos Aires City	577,225	31.41	4	377,451	20.54	2	782,984	42.61	6	—	—	—	99,947	5.44	—
Catamarca	102,943	52.52	2	50,657	25.84	—	42,415	21.64	—	—	—	—	—	—	—
Chaco	305,229	45.53	1	192,284	28.68	1	172,929	25.79	1	—	—	—	—	—	—
Chubut	101,885	32.85	1	118,246	38.12	1	71,333	23.00	1	—	—	—	18,698	6.03	—
Córdoba	286,615	12.60	1	751,428	33.02	3	509,837	22.41	2	679,603	29.87	3	48,057	2.11	—
Corrientes	253,334	38.72	2	178,855	27.34	1	222,006	33.94	1	—	—	—	—	—	—
Entre Ríos	293,605	39.81	2	174,787	23.70	1	269,189	36.50	1	—	—	—	—	—	—
Formosa	184,028	54.31	2	101,637	30.00	1	53,155	15.69	—	—	—	—	—	—	—
Jujuy	123,971	30.91	1	152,853	38.12	1	96,158	23.98	1	—	—	—	28,027	6.99	—
La Pampa	81,094	58.15	1	—	—	—	52,574	37.70	1	—	—	—	5,796	4.16	—
La Rioja	93,668	41.50	2	85,794	38.01	1	28,656	12.70	—	17,603	7.80	—	—	—	—
Mendoza	259,263	24.20	1	462,657	43.18	3	287,020	26.79	1	—	—	—	62,566	5.84	—
Misiones	252,335	64.87	3	—	—	—	109,856	28.24	1	—	—	—	26,776	6.88	—
Neuquén	111,828	29.09	1	136,290	35.46	1	79,773	20.75	1	—	—	—	56,507	14.70	—
Río Negro	134,429	32.84	1	126,879	31.00	1	67,986	16.61	1	—	—	—	80,059	19.56	—
Salta	280,111	36.48	2	305,397	39.77	2	101,188	13.18	—	40,723	5.30	—	40,487	5.27	—
San Juan	154,715	36.67	1	153,576	36.40	1	113,662	26.94	1	—	—	—	—	—	—
San Luis	83,178	27.31	1	125,123	41.08	1	71,718	23.55	—	16,323	5.36	—	8,256	2.71	—
Santa Cruz	45,182	36.68	1	—	—	—	18,595	15.10	—	—	—	—	59,391	48.22	1
Santa Fe	584,589	29.10	3	649,809	32.34	3	541,534	26.95	3	184,680	9.19	1	48,469	2.41	—
Santiago del Estero	417,016	89.27	4	—	—	—	50,115	10.73	—	—	—	—	—	—	—
Tierra del Fuego	34,206	34.12	2	30,534	30.46	1	13,254	13.22	—	7,908	7.89	—	14,337	14.30	—
Tucumán	443,377	46.94	3	286,594	30.34	1	171,603	18.17	1	—	—	—	43,002	4.55	—
Total	9,298,491	37.88	58	6,843,049	27.88	35	6,412,133	26.12	32	946,840	3.86	4	1,046,348	4.26	2

=== Senate ===
Party or alliance		Votes	%	Seats
Union for the Homeland	Union for the Homeland	4,739,859	40.82	10
Union for the Homeland	Front for the Renewal of Concord	253,428	2.18	2
Union for the Homeland	Unión por San Luis	82,957	0.71	1
Union for the Homeland	Total	5,076,244	43.72	13
La Libertad Avanza	La Libertad Avanza	2,854,193	24.58	5
La Libertad Avanza	Federal Renewal Party	153,333	1.32	2
La Libertad Avanza	Total	3,007,526	25.90	7
Juntos por el Cambio	Juntos por el Cambio	2,852,763	24.57	2
Juntos por el Cambio	Cambia Jujuy	97,481	0.84	0
Juntos por el Cambio	Cambia Santa Cruz	18,826	0.16	0
Juntos por el Cambio	Total	2,969,070	25.57	2
Workers' Left Front		438,922	3.78	0
Por Santa Cruz		58,500	0.50	2
Hacemos por Nuestro País	Christian Democratic Party	17,653	0.15	0
Hacemos por Nuestro País	Unity and Liberty Party	16,426	0.14	0
Hacemos por Nuestro País	Total	34,079	0.29	0
Agrarian and Social Party		25,985	0.22	0
Total		11,610,326	100.00	24
Valid votes		11,610,326	87.52	
Invalid votes		85,567	0.65	
Blank votes		1,570,128	11.84	
Total votes		13,266,021	100.00	
Registered voters/turnout		16,942,571	78.30	

==== Results by province ====
Province	Union for the Homeland			La Libertad Avanza			Juntos por el Cambio			Others		
Province	Votes	%	Seats	Votes	%	Seats	Votes	%	Seats	Votes	%	Seats
Buenos Aires	4,135,519	44.01	2	2,386,048	25.39	—	2,479,071	26.38	1	396,500	4.22	—
Formosa	184,475	54.18	2	103,030	30.26	1	52,983	15.56	—	—	—	—
Jujuy	123,453	30.54	1	153,333	37.93	2	97,481	24.11	—	29,987	7.42	—
La Rioja	95,733	42.44	2	85,152	37.75	1	27,026	11.98	—	17,653	7.83	—
Misiones	253,428	65.11	2	—	—	—	109,836	28.22	1	25,985	6.68	—
San Juan	155,266	36.73	2	153,951	36.42	1	113,509	26.85	—	—	—	—
San Luis	82,957	27.29	1	126,012	41.45	2	70,338	23.14	—	24,718	8.13	—
Santa Cruz	45,413	35.79	1	—	—	—	18,826	14.84	—	62,643	49.37	2
Total	5,076,244	43.72	13	3,007,526	25.90	7	2,969,070	25.57	2	557,486	4.80	2

=== Mercosur Parliament ===
Party	National			Provincial			Total seats
Party	Votes	%	Seats	Votes	%	Seats	Total seats
Union for the Homeland	9,387,184	36.38	7	9,278,963	38.11	14	21
La Libertad Avanza	7,508,592	29.10	6	6,741,551	27.69	8	14
Juntos por el Cambio	6,394,390	24.78	5	6,370,910	26.16	1	6
Hacemos por Nuestro País	1,708,429	6.62	1	944,780	3.88	0	1
Workers' Left Front	803,164	3.11	0	786,624	3.23	0	0
Together We Are Río Negro				58,351	0.24	0	0
Por Santa Cruz				54,355	0.22	1	1
Freemen of the South Movement				38,411	0.16	0	0
Neuquén People's Movement				28,642	0.12	0	0
Agrarian and Social Party				25,052	0.10	0	0
Salta Independiente				21,937	0.09	0	0
Total	25,801,759	100.00	19	24,349,576	100.00	24	43
Valid votes	25,801,759	93.40		24,349,576	88.18		
Invalid votes	226,163	0.82		219,265	0.79		
Blank votes	1,595,998	5.78		3,043,898	11.02		
Total votes	27,623,920	100.00		27,612,739	100.00		
Registered voters/turnout	35,854,122	77.05		35,397,600	78.01		

== Reactions ==
=== Domestic ===
Milei defeated Massa in the runoff what was described as a historic election in Argentina. Milei in his victory speech vowed to begin "the reconstruction of Argentina" and end the country's economic decline. His prospective foreign minister Diana Mondino also announced Argentina would pause their accession to BRICS. Massa conceded and announced his retirement from politics after the runoff election results showed that he had lost by roughly 11 percentage points.

Incumbent and retiring president Alberto Fernández congratulated Milei: "I am a man of democracy, and I value nothing more than the popular verdict. I trust that tomorrow we can start working with Javier Milei to guarantee an orderly transition." Former president Mauricio Macri, who had endorsed Milei in the runoff, said: "I congratulate Javier Milei for bravely representing the will to advance and prosper that lives in the hearts of Argentines. He knew how to listen to the voice of young people and the fatigue of millions of neglected and impoverished people."

=== International ===
Bolivia: Bolivian president Luis Arce wished success to Javier Milei and said that he would work hard to keep "firm relations" with Argentina. On the other hand, former president Evo Morales said that he would never wish success to "[Milei's] fascism, far-right and neoliberalism, who supports the Zionist genocide and Yankee imperialism."

Brazil: Brazilian president Luiz Inácio Lula da Silva congratulated Milei without mentioning his name, saying: "Democracy is the voice of the people, and it must always be respected. My congratulations to Argentine institutions for conducting the electoral process and to the Argentine people who participated on election day in an orderly and peaceful manner. I wish the new government good luck and success." Former president Jair Bolsonaro congratulated Milei saying: "Congratulations to the Argentine people for Javier Milei's victory. Hope will shine again in South America. May these good winds reach the United States and Brazil so that honesty, progress and freedom come back to all of us."

Chile: Chilean president Gabriel Boric congratulated Milei saying: "I salute Javier Milei for his victory and Sergio Massa for his worthy recognition of defeat. I wish the Argentine people the best and know that they will always have our respect and support. As president of Chile, I will work tirelessly to keep our sister nations united and collaborating for the well-being of all."

China: Chinese president Xi Jinping congratulated Milei saying: "I am ready to work with President-elect Milei to continue the China-Argentina friendship, help the development and revitalisation of our respective countries through win-win cooperation, and promote steady and far-reaching development of China-Argentina relations." Milei thanked Xi for his congratulations, replying "I thank President Xi Jinping for the congratulations and good wishes. I send him my most sincere wishes for the Chinese people's wellbeing."

Colombia: Colombian president Gustavo Petro lamented Milei's win, which was mocked by El Salvador president Nayib Bukele.

European Union: Charles Michel, the president of the European Council, congratulated Milei saying: "Congratulations to Argentina's new president-elect Javier Milei for his victory. The people of Argentina have spoken in free and democratic elections."

Ilan Goldfajn, the president of the Inter-American Development Bank, congratulated Milei saying: "Congratulations Javier Milei, president-elect of Argentina. At the IDB, we are ready to continue our collaboration with the country and promote sustainable and inclusive economic development for the benefit of its citizens."

India: Indian prime minister Narendra Modi congratulated Milei saying: "Congratulations for the victory in the Presidential elections. Look forward to working closely with you to diversify and expand India-Argentina strategic partnership."

Mexico: Mexican president Andrés Manuel López Obrador called Argentina's election of Milei an "own goal".

Paraguay: Paraguayan president Santiago Peña congratulated Milei saying: "I congratulate Javier Milei for his victory and I offer Paraguay's cordial and brotherly hand to strengthen relations between our countries."

Peru: Peruvian president Dina Boluarte congratulated Milei saying: "Peru expresses its warm congratulations to Javier Milei for his election as president of the Argentine Republic. Wishing him the greatest success in his administration, Peru renews its commitment to continue strengthening the historic ties of friendship and cooperation that unite our countries."

Russia: Russian president Vladimir Putin congratulated Milei, despite the latter support for Ukraine in the Russo-Ukrainian War. Putin's press secretary Dmitry Peskov said: "We noted a number of statements that Mr. Milei made during the election campaign, but we will focus on and judge him mainly by the statements that he makes after the inauguration" while remaining supportive of the "development of bilateral relations with Argentina."

Ukraine: Ukrainian president Volodymyr Zelenskyy congratulated Milei on his victory and thanked him for his clear stance of support for Ukraine. Zelenskyy further stated that he looked forward to working together with Milei to strengthen Ukrainian-Argentinian cooperation and restore international order based on international law. Zelenskyy and Milei held a phone call where they discussed cultivating relations and Ukraine's war against Russia.

United States: U.S. president Joe Biden congratulated Milei and held a phone call with him, where Biden said that Argentina can count on US support. Milei told Biden that he would align with the US and Israel, while repeatedly saying that he would cool relations with China. Antony Blinken, the United States Secretary of State, congratulated Milei saying: "The United States congratulates Argentine President-elect Javier Milei on his victory in today's election, and we applaud the robust democratic process through which the Argentine public has spoken. The strong turnout and peaceful conduct of the vote are a testament to Argentina's electoral and democratic institutions. We look forward to working with President-elect Milei and his government on shared priorities that benefit the people of both countries, including protecting human rights and democracy, addressing climate change, and investing in the middle class." Jake Sullivan, the National Security Advisor, congratulated Milei saying: "I congratulate Javier Milei on his election as president of Argentina and to the people of Argentina for holding free and fair elections. We look forward to building on our strong bilateral relationship based on our shared commitment to human rights, democratic values, and transparency." Former president Donald Trump congratulated Milei saying: "Congratulations to Javier Milei on a great race for president of Argentina. The whole world was watching! I am very proud of you. You will turn your country around and truly Make Argentina Great Again!"

Uruguay: Uruguayan president Luis Lacalle Pou congratulated Milei saying: "I salute President-elect Javier Milei. We have much to work on together and improve our bilateral relations."

Venezuela: Venezuelan president Nicolás Maduro, reacting to the election results, declared that "the neo-Nazi extreme right won in Argentina, we call for reflection on the emergence of extreme right centers that seek to impose themselves to recolonize Latin America and impose extremist models".
