= Eduardo Fernández =

Eduardo Fernández or Eduardo Fernandez is the name of:

- Eduardo Fernández (guitarist)
- Eduardo Fernández (Venezuelan politician) (born 1940), Venezuelan politician and lawyer
- Eduardo Fernández (Argentine politician) (born 1952), Argentine politician
- Eduardo Fernández (Peruvian footballer) (1923–2002), Peruvian football forward
- Eduardo Fernández (Mexican footballer) (born 1990), Mexican football midfielder
- Eduardo Fernández Rubiño (born 1991), Spanish politician

== See also ==
- Lalo Fernández (born 1992), born Eduardo Fernández Lopez, Mexican football goalkeeper
