= Cristina Pérez =

Cristina Pérez may refer to:

- Cristina Perez (judge) (born 1968), U.S. judge
- Cristina Pérez (reporter) (born 1973), Argentine journalist
- Cristina Pérez (athlete) (born 1965), Spanish Olympic hurdler
