= Ianni =

Ianni is an Italian surname. Notable people with the surname include:

- Ana María Ianni (born 1969), Argentine politician
- Octavio Ianni (1926–2004), Brazilian sociologist
- Patrick Ianni (born 1985), American soccer player
- Stefano Ianni (born 1981), Italian tennis player
- Tayt Ianni (born 1971), American soccer player

== See also ==
- Larry Di Ianni, Canadian politician
