= Carlos Presti =

Minister of Defence of Argentina since 2025

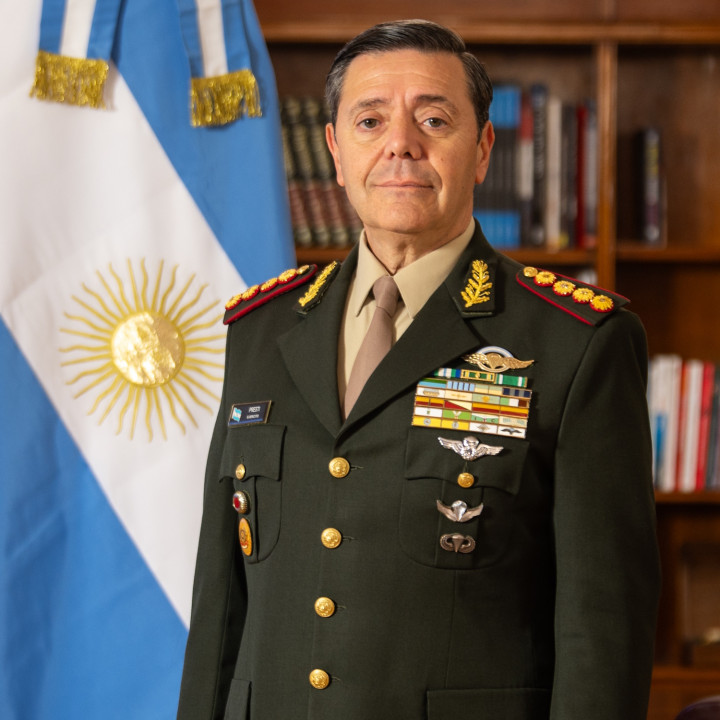
- Presti in 2026

Minister of Defence
- Incumbent
- Assumed office 10 December 2025
- President: Javier Milei
- Preceded by: Luis Petri

Chief of the Army General Staff
- In office 10 January 2024 – 12 December 2025
- President: Javier Milei
- Preceded by: Guillermo Pereda
- Succeeded by: Oscar Zarich

Personal details
- Born: 23 June 1966 (age 60) Buenos Aires
- Party: Independent
- Parent(s): Roque Presti; María Isabel Valdés

Carlos Alberto Presti (Spanish pronunciation: [ˈkaɾlos alˈβeɾto ˈpɾesti]; born 23 June 1966) is an Argentine Army general who served as Chief of the Argentine Army from 2024 to 2025. He was later appointed Minister of Defense of Argentina by President Javier Milei, taking office on 10 December 2025.

== Biography ==
Presti was born in Buenos Aires. His the son of Roque Carlos Alberto Presti, also a military officer. He studied at the Colegio Militar de la Nación, where he graduated with the rank of second lieutenant as part of the 118th class.

During his military career he served as commander of the 601 Air Assault Regiment and the IV Airborne Brigade, and also he served as director of the Colegio Militar de la Nación. He additionally served as a United Nations peacekeeper in Haiti and as a military attaché in Guatemala.

He was promoted to the rank of general during the presidency of Alberto Fernández. After Javier Milei assumed the presidency, Presti was appointed Chief of the Army in January 2024. He remained in that position until Milei nominated him as Minister of Defense to replace Luis Petri, who was elected National Deputy in December 2025. Presti became the first active or former military officer to serve as minister in Argentina since the return of democracy in 1983.
