= Luis Petri =

Argentine politician (born 1972)

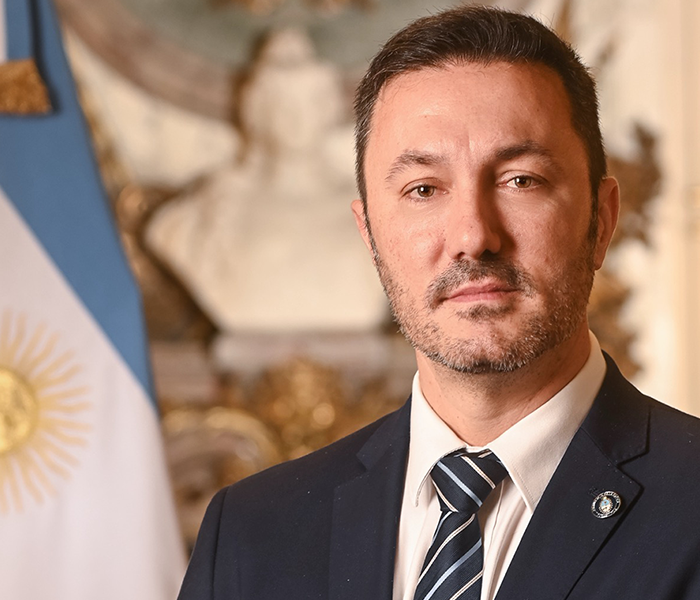
- Official portrait, 2024

National Deputy
- Incumbent
- Assumed office 10 December 2025
- Constituency: Mendoza
- In office 10 December 2013 – 10 December 2021
- Constituency: Mendoza

Minister of Defense
- In office 10 December 2023 – 9 December 2025
- President: Javier Milei
- Preceded by: Jorge Taiana
- Succeeded by: Carlos Presti

Provincial Deputy of Mendoza
- In office 1 May 2006 – 9 December 2013
- Constituency: Section II

Personal details
- Born: 1 April 1977 (age 49) San Martín, Mendoza, Argentina
- Party: Radical Civic Union (2010–2025); La Libertad Avanza (since 2025)
- Other political affiliations: Social and Civic Agreement (2009–2011); Juntos por el Cambio (2015–2023)
- Domestic partner: Cristina Pérez (2021–present)
- Children: 1
- Education: National University of the Littoral

Luis Alfonso Petri (Spanish pronunciation: [ˈlwis alˈfonso ˈpetɾi]; born 1 April 1977) is an Argentine lawyer and politician who is serving as the country's Minister of Defence since 2023 under president Javier Milei. Previously, from 2013 to 2021, he was a National Deputy elected in Mendoza Province. Prior to serving as a member of the National Congress, he was a member of the Legislature of Mendoza from 2006 to 2013.

He was Patricia Bullrich's running mate in the 2023 presidential election, running as part of the "Force of Change" list within the Juntos por el Cambio coalition, coming third in the first round.

== Early life and education ==
Petri was born on 1 April 1977 in San Martín, Mendoza. He studied law at the National University of the Littoral (UNL), later working as a private lawyer at his own firm.

== Political career ==
Petri became involved in politics as a member of the Juventud Radical, the youth wing of the Radical Civic Union (UCR). He was elected vice president of the Mendoza Juventud Radical in 2003, and from 2003 to 2006 he was legislative secretary of the Mendoza Province Senate.

In the 2005 provincial legislative elections, he ran for a seat in the Chamber of Deputies in Section II as part of the UCR list, and was elected with 33.90% of the vote. He took office on 1 May 2006. He was re-elected to a second term as part of the Federal Civic Front list in the 2009 elections with 51.76% of the vote. During his time in the provincial legislature he specialized in matters of security and law and order, authoring a bill to make crimes with aggravating circumstances non-commutable.

In the 2013 legislative election, Petri ran for one of Mendoza's seats in the Argentine Chamber of Deputies. He was the third candidate in the UCR list, behind Julio Cobos and Patricia Giménez, and was elected with 47.69% of the vote. He was re-elected in 2017 as part of the Cambiemos coalition.

As a national deputy, Petri formed part of the parliamentary commissions on Internal Security, Addiction Prevention and Drug-trafficking Control, Transport, Communications and Information, Criminal Legislation, Justice, and General Legislation. He was second vice-president of the Chamber from 2017 to 2019, during the presidency of Emilio Monzó.

He voted against the legalization of abortion in Argentina twice: in 2018 and 2020.

In 2023, he sought the Juntos por el Cambio nomination to run for Governor of Mendoza, running against former governor and fellow UCR member Alfredo Cornejo. He received 17.4% of the PASO votes against Cornejo's 26.7%. On 22 June 2023, presidential hopeful Patricia Bullrich of the Republican Proposal party announced Petri would be her running mate in the 2023 presidential election, as part of the "Force of Change" list within the Juntos por el Cambio coalition.

== Personal life ==
Petri has one child. Since 2021, he has been in a relationship with journalist and Telefé newscaster Cristina Pérez.

== Electoral history ==
=== Executive ===
Electoral history of Luis Petri
Election	Office	List	Votes			Result	Ref.
Election	Office	List	Total	%	P.	Result	Ref.
2023 PASO	Governor of Mendoza	Cambia Mendoza	166,758	17.4%	3rd (Note: Out of all candidates in all lists.)	Not elected (Note: Lost the coalition's primary.)	
2023	Vice President of Argentina	Juntos por el Cambio	6,379,023	23.81%	3rd	Not elected	

=== Legislative ===
Electoral history of Luis Petri
Election	Office	List	#	District	Votes			Result	Ref.
Election	Office	List	#	District	Total	%	P.	Result	Ref.
2005	Provincial Deputy	Radical Civic Union	1	Section II	57,678	33.90%	1st (Note: Presented on an electoral list. The data shown represents the share of the vote the entire party/alliance received in that constituency.)	Elected	
2009	Provincial Deputy	Federal Civic Front	1	Section II	105,679	51.76%	1st	Elected	
2013	National Deputy	Radical Civic Union	3	Mendoza Province	487,372	47.69%	1st	Elected	
2017	National Deputy	Cambia Mendoza	2	Mendoza Province	491,012	45.73%	1st	Elected	

Political offices
Preceded by Jorge Taiana	Minister of Defense; 2023–2025	Succeeded by Carlos Presti
