= María Graciela Parola =

Argentine politician

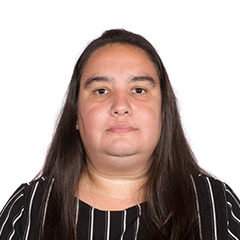

National Deputy
- Incumbent
- Assumed office 10 December 2019
- Constituency: Formosa

Personal details
- Born: 6 September 1978 (age 47)
- Party: Frente de Todos
- Occupation: Lawyer

María Graciela Parola (born 6 September 1978) is an Argentine politician who is a member of the Chamber of Deputies.

== Biography ==
Parola studied at the University of Moron from 1997 to 2003 before she was elected in 2019.
