= Santiago Igon =

Argentine politician

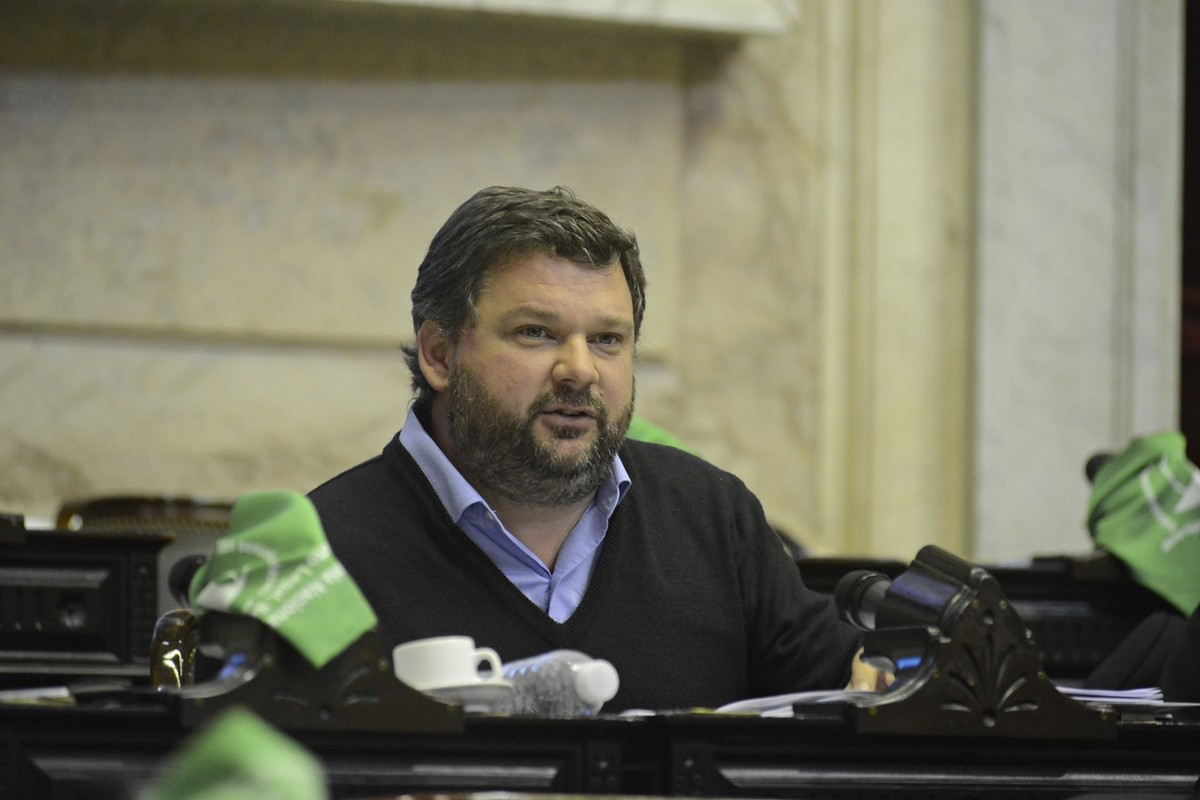

National Deputy
- In office 10 December 2015 – 10 December 2023
- Constituency: Chubut

Personal details
- Born: 24 October 1977 (age 48) Mercedes, Buenos Aires, Argentina
- Party: Justicialist Party
- Other political affiliations: Front for Victory (2005–2017); Unidad Ciudadana (2017–2019); Frente de Todos (2019–present)

Santiago Nicolás Igon (born 24 October 1977) is an Argentine politician, who served as a National Deputy elected in Chubut Province. A member of the Justicialist Party and La Cámpora, Igon served as a Deputy from 2015 to 2023. In the Chamber of Deputies, he sat in the Frente de Todos bloc.

== Early life and education ==
Igon was born on 24 October 1977 in Mercedes, Buenos Aires Province. He studied psychological orientation and addictions assessment at the University of Morón, graduating with a technician's degree.

== Political career ==
In 2005, he was appointed regional coordinator of the Undersecretariat of Addictions Attention of Buenos Aires Province, in the administration of Daniel Scioli. He would serve in the post until 2008, when he moved to Esquel, Chubut Province. He was an employee at the local branch of ANSES in Esquel, and later worked as head of the District Unit for Inclusivity Support (Spanish: Unidad Distrital de Apoyo a la Inclusión, UDAI) from 2013 to 2015. He also became politically involved in La Cámpora, eventually rising through the ranks and becoming the organisation's leader in Chubut by 2013.

In the 2015 general election, Igon ran for one of Chubut's seats in the National Chamber of Deputies as the first candidate in the Front for Victory (FPV) list, followed by Ana María Llanos Massa. With 42.44% of the vote, the FPV was the most voted alliance in the province, and both Igon and Llanos Massa were elected. He was re-elected in 2019 as the first candidate in the Frente de Todos list, which received 53.45% of the vote.

During his 2019–2023 term, Igon formed part of the parliamentary commissions on Human Rights and Guarantees, Energy and Fuels, Labour Legislation, Mining, Internal Security, Addiction Prevention, and Maritime Interests (the latter two of which he served in as secretary). He was a supporter of the legalisation of abortion in Argentina, voting in favour of the two Voluntary Interruption of Pregnancy bills debated by the Argentine Congress in 2018 and 2020, the last of which passed the Chamber and became law in 2021.

== Personal life ==
Igon is married and has three children.
