= Solidary Party =

Argentine political party

Solidary Party Partido Solidario
- President: Carlos Heller
- Secretary: Juan Carlos Junio
- Founded: 23 March 2007; 18 years ago
- Membership (2017): ▲30.200
- Ideology: Co-operatism; Socialism
- Political position: Left-wing
- National affiliation: Homeland Force
- Regional affiliation: São Paulo Forum
- Colors: Green, black
- Seats in the Chamber of Deputies: 1 / 257
- Seats in the Senate: 0 / 72

Website
- https://www.partidosolidario.org.ar/

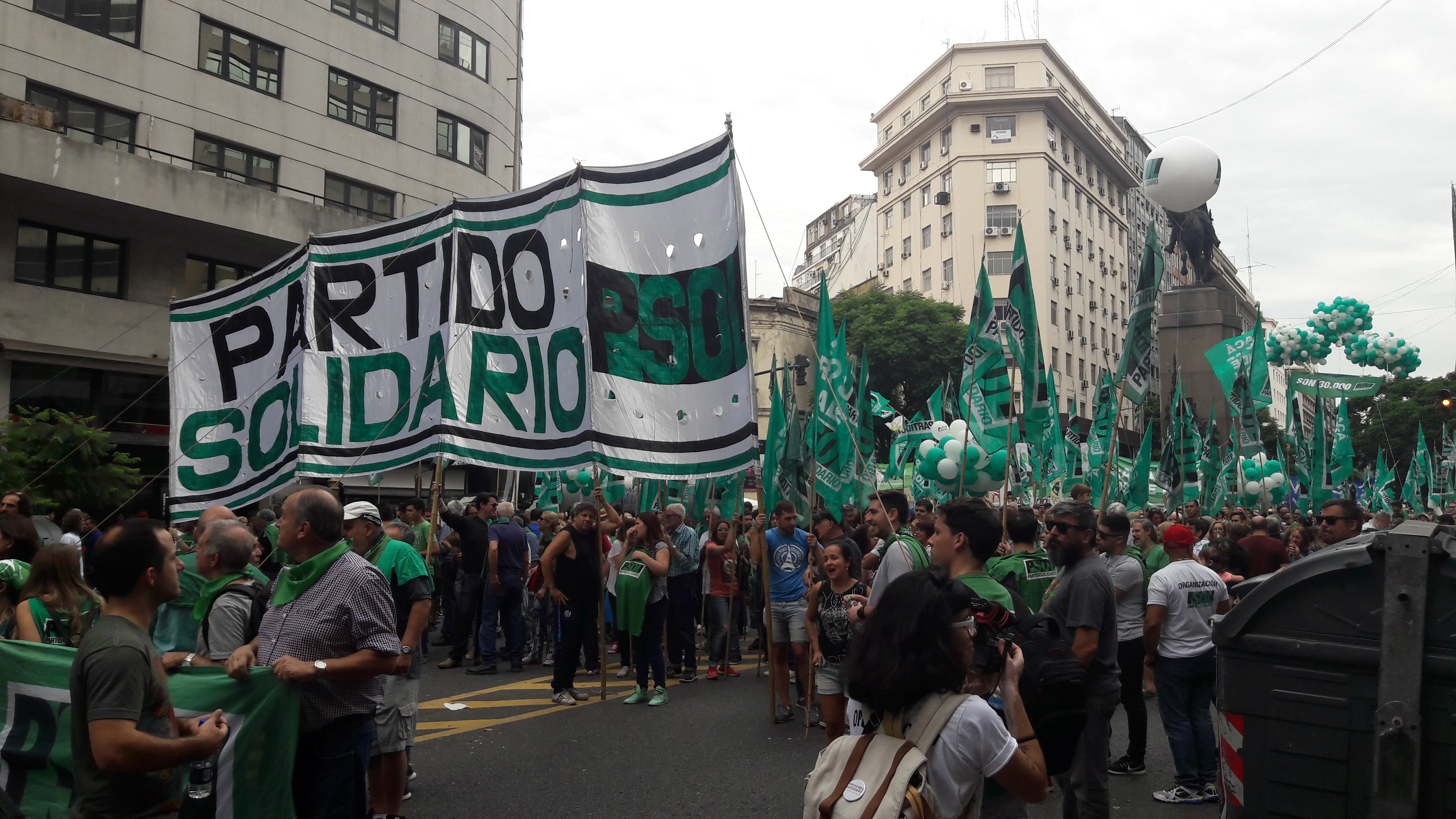
Solidary Party supporters at the 2018 Day of Remembrance for Truth and Justice march in Buenos Aires.

The Solidary Party (Spanish: Partido Solidario; PSOL) is a co-operatist political party in Argentina, founded by banker and politician Carlos Heller in 2007. It was part of the Frente de Todos coalition, and was part of the kirchnerist Front for Victory from its foundation until the alliance's dissolution in 2019. The party was also previously aligned with New Encounter. It is now a member of the Unión por la Patria, formed to support Sergio Massa's 2023 presidential campaign.

The party has minor representation in the Argentine Chamber of Deputies: Heller, who has sat as a National Deputy since 2019 representing the Autonomous City of Buenos Aires and served as member of the Chamber from 2009 to 2017 as well, and Eduardo Fernández of Córdoba.

== Electoral performance ==
=== President ===
| Election year | Candidate | Coalition | 1st round | | 2nd round | | Result |
| Election year | Candidate | Coalition | # of overall votes | % of overall vote | # of overall votes | % of overall vote | Result |
|---|---|---|---|---|---|---|---|
| 2007 | Cristina Kirchner | Front for Victory | 8,651,066 | 45.29 (1st) | — | | ✓ Elected |
| 2011 | Cristina Kirchner | Front for Victory | 11,865,055 | 54.11 (1st) | — | | ✓ Elected |
| 2015 | Daniel Scioli | Front for Victory | 9,338,449 | 37.08 (1st) | 12,198,441 | 48.60 (2nd) | ✗ 2-R Defeated |
| 2019 | Alberto Fernández | Frente de Todos | 12,473,709 | 48.10 (1st) | — | | ✓ Elected |
