= Ana María Ianni =

Argentine politician

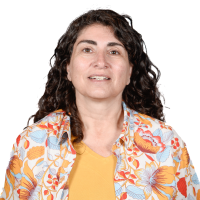

National Deputy
- Incumbent
- Assumed office 10 December 2023
- Constituency: Santa Cruz
- In office 10 December 2011 – 10 December 2015
- Constituency: Santa Cruz

National Senator
- In office 10 December 2017 – 10 December 2023
- Constituency: Santa Cruz

Personal details
- Born: 21 September 1969 (age 56) Buenos Aires, Argentina
- Party: Justicialist Party
- Other political affiliations: Front for Victory (2011–2017); Unidad Ciudadana (2017–2019); Frente de Todos (2019–2023); Union for the Homeland (2023–present)
- Education: Pontifical Catholic University of Argentina; University of Morón

Ana María Ianni (born 21 September 1969) is an Argentine politician, currently serving as National Deputy elected in Santa Cruz since 2023. Ianni previously served in the same position from 2011 to 2015, and later served as a National Senator for Santa Cruz from 2017 to 2023.

She is a member of the Justicialist Party.

== Early and personal life ==
Ianni was born on 21 September 1969 in Buenos Aires. She studied a professorship in educational sciences at the Pontifical Catholic University of Argentina (UCA), graduating in 1991. In 2001, she graduated as a higher technician in tourism from the University of Morón.

In 2001, she travelled to El Calafate, Santa Cruz, and decided to become a tourist guide there. She continued to work as a tourist guide for a private agency until 2007.

She is married and has three children.

== Political career ==
In 2007, the mayor of El Calafate, Javier Belloni, appointed Ianni as secretary of tourism of the city. She continued to work in the municipal government until 2011, when she was elected to the National Chamber of Deputies as part of the Front for Victory list. Later, when her mandate ended in 2015, she was elected to the City Council of El Calafate, a position she held until 2017.

In the 2017 legislative election, Ianni was elected National Senator for Santa Cruz, as part of the Unidad Ciudadana list. The list received 32.07% of the vote, coming second behind the Cambiemos list, and so Ianni was elected for the minority seat. In the Senate, she formed part of the parliamentary commissions on Budget and Finances, Internal Security, Industry and Commerce, Mining and Fuels, Infrastructure, Housing and Transport, Environment and Sustainable Development, Population and Human Development, Science and Technology, Education and Culture, Sport, Health, and Women's Affairs.

In 2018 and later in 2020, she voted in favour of the legalisation of abortion in Argentina.

== Electoral history ==
Electoral history of Ana María Ianni
Election	Office	List	#	District	Votes			Result	Ref.
Election	Office	List	#	District	Total	%	P.	Result	Ref.
2011	National Deputy	Front for Victory	2	Santa Cruz Province	74,846	65.41%	1st (Note: Presented on an electoral list. The data shown represents the share of the vote the entire party/alliance received in that constituency.)	Elected	
2015	Councilwoman	Front for Victory	1	El Calafate	7000	76.89%	1st	Elected	
2017	National Senator	Unidad Ciudadana	1	Santa Cruz Province	53,646	32.07%	2nd	Elected	
2023	National Deputy	Union for the Homeland	4	Santa Cruz Province	45,182	36.68%	2nd	Elected	
