= Virginia Cornejo =

Argentine politician

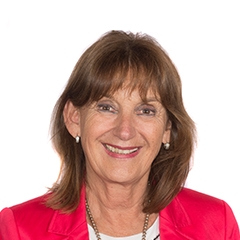

National Deputy
- Incumbent
- Assumed office 10 December 2019
- Constituency: Salta

Provincial Deputy of Salta
- In office 10 December 2005 – 10 December 2013
- Constituency: Capital Department

Personal details
- Born: 18 October 1951 (age 74) Salta, Argentina
- Party: Salta Renewal Party (formerly); Salta Proposal Party (2010–2015); Republican Proposal (2015–present)
- Other political affiliations: Juntos por el Cambio (2015–present)
- Education: Universidad Católica de Salta

Virginia María Cornejo (born 18 October 1951) is an Argentine politician, currently serving as National Deputy elected in Salta Province. A member of Republican Proposal (PRO), Cornejo was elected in 2019, and currently sits in the Juntos por el Cambio parliamentary inter-bloc. She previously served as a member of the Salta Province Chamber of Deputies from 2005 to 2013, and as a city councillor in her hometown of Salta from 2015 to 2019.

== Early life and education ==
Cornejo was born on 18 October 1951 in Salta, capital of the homonymous Salta Province. She studied to be a certified tourist guide in her province at the Universidad Católica de Salta (UCASAL), later acquiring a degree on tourism from the Instituto Superior Perito Moreno, and a technician's degree on marketing from UCASAL.

== Early political career and provincial deputy ==
Cornejo's political career began in 1970, when she was appointed head of the tourism department of the Casa de Salta, the province's "cultural embassy" in Buenos Aires. She held the post until the following year. In 1993, Cornejo was designated director of social action in the Municipality of the City of Salta.

In the 2003 legislative elections, Cornejo ran for a seat in the National Chamber of Deputies in the Salta Renewal Party (PRS) list, behind Carlos Sosa. The PRS received 23.19% of the vote and came second, behind the Front for Victory, securing enough votes for only Sosa to be elected.

=== Provincial deputy ===
In 2005, Cornejo ran for a seat in the Chamber of Deputies of Salta in the PRS list in the Capital Department, and won. In 2007, she split from the PRS and instead joined the Salta Proposal Party (PPS), citing differences with the PRS's leadership which had established an alliance with the governing Front for Victory. That year, she ran for one of Salta's three seats in the National Senate as the second candidate in the PPS list, behind Luis García Salado. The PPS received only 2.87% of the vote, and none of its candidates were elected. In 2009, Cornejo ran for re-election as part of the Social and Civic Agreement list, of which the PPS formed part. With 10.08% of the vote, the list received enough votes for Cornejo to secure another term as a member of the provincial legislature.

As a member of the provincial Chamber of Deputies, Cornejo stood in opposition to the governing Justicialist Party and its majority in the chamber. She sought to audit the provincial government in cases of alleged mismanagement of public funds and did a number of public accusations against provincial officials. In 2010, Cornejo was elected president of the Salta Proposal Party.

== 2011, 2013 and 2015 candidacies ==
Cornejo would run for a seat in the National Congress again in 2011 (as part of the Union for Social Development, in the Chamber of Deputies list) and 2013 (as part of the Union for the Republic, in the Senate list). Both times, the lists in which she ran did not receive enough votes for her to be elected. In the 2013 election, her Union for the Republic list had such poor results in the PASO primaries that it did not participate in the general election.

In 2013, she also sought a third term as a member of the provincial Chamber of Deputies, as part of the PPS list. She won in the PPS primaries, but did not receive enough votes in the general election to secure re-election.

In the 2015 local elections in the City of Salta, Cornejo ran for a seat in the city council as part of the Republican Proposal list. With 29,349 votes in the general election, the list received enough votes for Cornejo to be elected to a two-year term in the Council. She formed part of the council's general legislation, treasury, budget and accountings, and social action and scholarships commissions.

== National deputy ==
At the 2019 general election, Cornejo was the second candidate in the Juntos por el Cambio list to the National Chamber of Deputies, behind Miguel Nanni; the list received 35% of the popular vote, coming second and securing both Nanni and Cornejo seats in the lower house of Congress. She was sworn in on 4 December 2019.

As a national deputy, Cornejo formed part of the parliamentary commissions on Natural Resources and Conservation, Prevision and Social Security, Small and Medium-sized Businesses, Mining, Disabilities, Sports, and Tourism, the last of which she co-chaired as second vice-president. She was an opponent of the legalisation of abortion in Argentina, voting against the 2020 Voluntary Interruption of Pregnancy bill that passed the Argentine Congress.

== Personal life ==
Cornejo is married to Armando Isasmendi and has four children.
