= Mariana Stilman =

Argentine politician

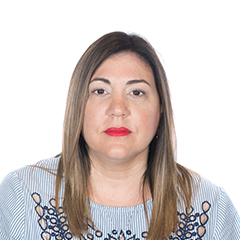

Member of the Chamber of Deputies of Argentina
- Incumbent
- Assumed office 10 December 2019
- Constituency: Buenos Aires

Personal details
- Born: 3 November 1975 (age 50)
- Party: Coalition Civil
- Occupation: Lawyer

Mariana Stilman is an Argentine politician who is a member of the Chamber of Deputies of Argentina.

== Biography ==
Stilman worked as a lawyer before she was elected in 2019.
