= Ximena García =

Argentine politician

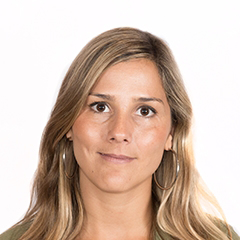

Member of the Chamber of Deputies of Argentina
- Incumbent
- Assumed office 2019

Personal details
- Born: 16 August 1989 (age 37)
- Party: Radical Civic Union
- Education: National University of the Littoral

Ximena García is an Argentine politician who is a member of the Chamber of Deputies of Argentina.

== Biography ==
García worked as a lawyer before her election in 2019.
