= Francisco Sánchez (Argentine politician) =

Argentine politician

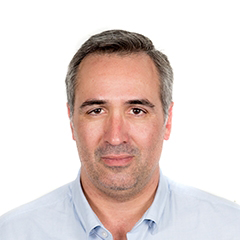

Secretary of Worship
- Incumbent
- Assumed office 16 January 2024
- President: Javier Milei
- Preceded by: Guillermo Oliveri

National Deputy
- In office 10 December 2019 – 10 December 2023
- Constituency: Neuquén

Personal details
- Born: 23 December 1973 (age 52)
- Children: 2
- Occupation: Civil servant

Francisco Sánchez (Spanish pronunciation: [fɾanˈsisko ˈsantʃes]; born 23 December 1973) is an Argentine politician. A member of Republican Proposal (PRO), he served as a member of the Chamber of Deputies elected in Neuquén Province from 2019 to 2023. Since 2024, he has been Secretary of Worship in the cabinet of President Javier Milei.

Sánchez is known for his extreme positions on many subjects, having been described as far-right and ultra-conservative.

== Biography ==
Sánchez was born in Lomas de Zamora, Buenos Aires Province, on 23 December 1973.

Sánchez was elected to the Chamber of Deputies in 2019.

He was appointed to the Secretariat of Worship by President Javier Milei on 16 January 2024. In May 2024, during a speech at the Europa Viva 2024 conference hosted by the Spanish far-right party Vox, Sánchez criticized Argentina's abortion laws, same-sex marriage and divorce, as well as the previous governments' Comprehensive Sex Education (Spanish: Educación sexual integral) programmes.
