= José Carlos Núñez =

Argentine politician

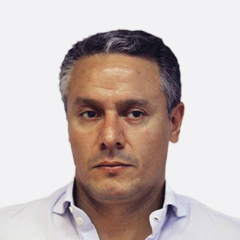

Member of the Chamber of Deputies of Argentina
- Incumbent
- Assumed office 10 December 2019
- Constituency: Santa Fe

Personal details
- Born: 12 November 1984 (age 41)
- Party: Republican Proposal

José Carlos Núñez is an Argentine politician who is a member of the Chamber of Deputies of Argentina.

== Biography ==
Núñez was elected in 2019.
