= Dina Rezinovsky =

Argentine politician

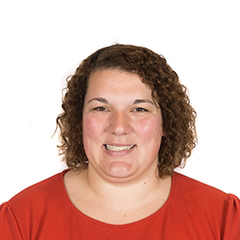

National Deputy
- In office 10 December 2019 – 10 December 2023
- Constituency: City of Buenos Aires

Personal details
- Born: Dina Esther Rezinovsky; 29 January 1987 (age 39) Buenos Aires, Argentina
- Party: Republican Proposal
- Other political affiliations: Juntos por el Cambio (2019–2023)

Dina Esther Rezinovsky (born 29 January 1987) is an Argentine politician. She served as a National Deputy elected in the Federal Capital from 2019 to 2023. She is a member of Republican Proposal (PRO).

== Early life and career ==
Rezinovsky was born on 29 January 1987 in Buenos Aires. Her parents, José Rezinovsky and Claudia Fanderwud, are Evangelical pastors from La Rioja Province. Rezinovsky herself is a devout Evangelical Christian. She grew up in La Rioja, and moved back to Buenos Aires when she was 21 years old.

== Political career ==
Rezinovsky became politically active in Republican Proposal (PRO) during the mayorship of Mauricio Macri in Buenos Aires in 2012. That year, she became employed as a communications advisor at the city government, a position she held until 2016. From 2016 to 2019, she was a ministerial agent at the Ministry of Social Development under Carolina Stanley, during Macri's time as president of Argentina.

Rezinovsky has also held a number of positions within PRO, having acted as communications secretary of Jóvenes PRO, the party's youth wing, from 2014 to 2016, and national coordinator of Jóvenes PRO from 2016 to 2018.

Rezinovsky ran for a seat in the Chamber of Deputies in the 2019 legislative election, as the eighth candidate in the Juntos por el Cambio list. The list was the most voted in the general election with 52.86% of the vote, more than enough for Rezinovsky to make it past the D'Hondt and be elected.

As a national deputy, Rezinovsky formed part of the parliamentary commissions on Education, Disabilities, Elderly People, Co-operative Affairs and NGOs, Social Action and Public Health, and Human Rights and Guarantees. Owing to her faith, she was a vocal opponent of the legalization of abortion in Argentina. She voted against the Voluntary Interruption of Pregnancy bill debated by the Argentine Congress in 2020, which eventually passed and went on to legalize abortion in 2021. Rezinovsky was also one of 11 deputies to vote against the trans labour quota bill passed by the Chamber in 2021.
