= Federico Angelini =

Argentine politician

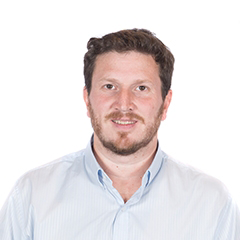

Member of the Chamber of Deputies of Argentina
- Incumbent
- Assumed office 10 December 2019

Personal details
- Born: 19 February 1977 (age 49)
- Party: Republican Proposal

Federico Angelini is an Argentine politician who is a member of the Chamber of Deputies of Argentina

== Biography ==
Angelini was elected in 2021.
