= Florencia Lampreabe =

Argentine politician

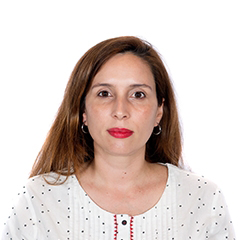

Member of the Chamber of Deputies of Argentina
- Incumbent
- Assumed office 10 December 2019
- Constituency: Buenos Aires

Personal details
- Born: 2 December 1982 (age 43)
- Party: Frente de Todos
- Occupation: Graduate in Political Science

Florencia Lampreabe is an Argentine politician who is a member of the Chamber of Deputies of Argentina.

== Biography ==
Lampreabe was elected in 2019.
