= Alejandra Obeid =

Argentine politician

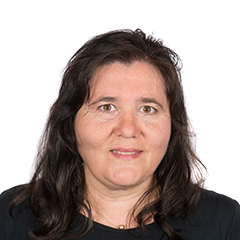

Member of the Chamber of Deputies of Argentina
- Incumbent
- Assumed office 10 December 2019

Personal details
- Born: 12 April 1978 (age 48)
- Party: Frente de Todos
- Occupation: Technician in Human Resource management

Alejandra Obeid is an Argentine politician who is a member of the Chamber of Deputies of Argentina.

== Biography ==
Obeid was elected in 2021.
