= Alfredo Schiavoni =

Argentine politician

Alfredo Oscar Schiavoni
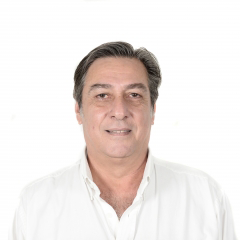

Member of the Chamber of Deputies of Argentina
- Incumbent
- Assumed office 10 December 2019
- Constituency: Misiones

Personal details
- Born: 7 April 1963 (age 63)
- Party: Republican Proposal

Alfredo Oscar Schiavoni is an Argentine politician who is a member of the Chamber of Deputies of Argentina.

== Biography ==
Schiavoni was elected in 2019.
