= Hilda Aguirre =

Argentine politician

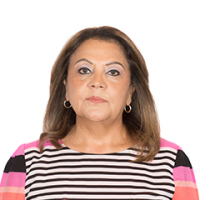

Member of the Chamber of Deputies of Argentina
- Constituency: La Rioja

Personal details
- Born: April 11, 1960 (age 66)
- Party: Frente de Todos
- Children: Psychologist

Hilda Aguirre is an Argentine politician who is a member of the Chamber of Deputies of Argentina She was elected in 2019.
