= Alejandro Cacace =

Argentine politician (born 1985)

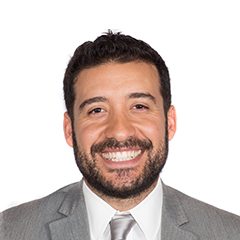
- Cacace in 2020

National Deputy
- In office 10 December 2019 – 10 December 2023
- Constituency: San Luis

Personal details
- Born: 21 March 1985 (age 41)
- Party: Radical Civic Union
- Other political affiliations: Evolución
- Education: National University of Córdoba
- Occupation: Lawyer

Alejandro Cacace (Spanish pronunciation: [aleˈxandɾo kaˈkase]; born 21 March 1985) is an Argentine politician of the Radical Civic Union (UCR). He was a member of the Chamber of Deputies elected in San Luis Province from 2019 to 2023.

== Biography ==
Cacace graduated from National University of Córdoba in 2007 and worked as a lawyer, and multiple local offices before his election in 2019. He also earned a MPA from Harvard Kennedy School in 2023.
