= Lisandro Nieri =

Politician in Argentina

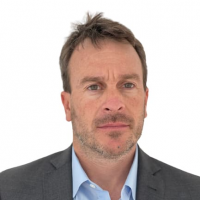

National Deputy
- Incumbent
- Assumed office 16 December 2021
- Constituency: Mendoza

Personal details
- Born: 12 June 1972 (age 54)
- Party: Radical Civic Union
- Occupation: Econimst

Lisandro Nieri (born 12 June 1972) is an Argentine politician who is a member of the Chamber of Deputies of Argentina.

== Biography ==
Nieri was elected in 2021.
