= Dolores Martínez =

Argentine politician

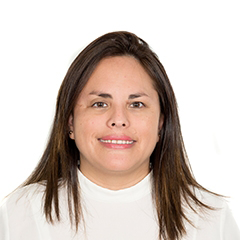

National Deputy
- In office 10 December 2019 – 10 December 2023
- Constituency: City of Buenos Aires

Personal details
- Born: 16 May 1978 (age 48) Andalgalá, Argentina
- Party: Radical Civic Union
- Other political affiliations: Broad Front UNEN (2013–2015); Evolución (2017–2019); Juntos por el Cambio (2019–present)
- Education: University of Buenos Aires
- Profession: Political scientist

María Dolores Martínez (born 16 May 1978) is an Argentine political scientist and politician who served as National Deputy elected in the City of Buenos Aires from 2019 to 2023. She is a member of the Radical Civic Union (UCR).

Since 2023, she has served as Parliamentary Pro-secretary of the Argentine Senate.

== Early life and career ==
Martínez was born on 16 May 1978 in Andalgalá, Catamarca Province. She studied Political Science at the University of Buenos Aires, graduating in 2016. Martínez is in a relationship with Marcelo Sances and has two children.

== Political career ==
Martínez has worked in the National Congress of Argentina since 1999, first as a legislative aide at the Radical Civic Union parliamentary bloc from 1999 to 2012, and then as parliamentary secretary in the UNEN Suma+ bloc from 2013 to 2015. In 2016, she was appointed director of Innovation, Transparency, and Democratic Strengthening of the Chamber of Deputies. She belongs to the Evolución group within the UCR, led by Martín Lousteau.

She ran for a seat in the Chamber of Deputies in the 2019 legislative election, as the sixth candidate in the Juntos por el Cambio list in Buenos Aires. The list was the most voted in the general election, with 53.02% of the vote, and Martínez was elected.

As a national deputy, Martínez formed part of the parliamentary commissions on Petitions, Powers and Norms, National Defense, Maritime Interests, Labour Legislation, Freedom of Expression, Foreign Affairs and Worship, Housing and Urban Planning, Culture, and Communications. She was supporter of the legalization of abortion in Argentina, voting in favour of the 2020 Voluntary Interruption of Pregnancy bill that passed the Argentine Congress 2020.
