= Liliana Yambrún =

Argentine politician

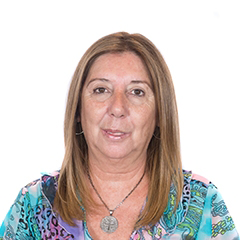

National Deputy
- In office 10 December 2019 – 10 December 2023
- Constituency: Buenos Aires

Personal details
- Born: 13 October 1957 (age 68) Buenos Aires, Argentina
- Party: Justicialist Party
- Other political affiliations: Front for Victory (2003–2017); Unidad Ciudadana (2017–2019); Frente de Todos (2019–present)

Liliana Patricia Yambrún (born 13 October 1957) is an Argentine politician. She served as National Deputy representing Buenos Aires Province. A member of the Justicialist Party, Yambrún was elected in 2019 for the Frente de Todos. She previously worked in the municipal government of La Matanza Partido, as private secretary during the mayorship of Verónica Magario.

Born in Buenos Aires, Yambrún is divorced and has two children. She ran for a seat in the La Matanza City Council in the 2017 elections as part of the Unidad Ciudadana coalition. She ran for a seat in the Argentine Chamber of Deputies in the 2019 legislative election; she was the 10th candidate in the Frente de Todos list in Buenos Aires Province. The list received 51.64% of the vote, enough for Yambrún to be elected.

As a national deputy, Yambrún formed part of the parliamentary commissions on Foreign Affairs and Worship, Mercosur, Freedom of Expression, Families and Childhood, Communications, and Municipal Affairs. She was a supporter of the 2020 Voluntary Interruption of Pregnancy bill, which legalized abortion in Argentina.

== Electoral history ==
Electoral history of Liliana Yambrún
Election	Office	List	#	District	Votes			Result	Ref.
Election	Office	List	#	District	Total	%	P.	Result	Ref.
2017	Councillor	Unidad Ciudadana	6	La Matanza Partido	397.298	50.02%	1st (Note: Presented on an electoral list. The data shown represents the share of the vote the entire party/alliance received in that constituency.)	Elected	
2019	National Deputy	Frente de Todos	10	Buenos Aires Province	5,113,359	52.64%	1st	Elected	
