= Claudia Beatriz Ormachea =

Argentine politician and psychologist (born 1959)

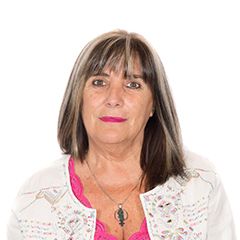

Member of the Chamber of Deputies of Argentina
- Incumbent
- Assumed office 10 December 2019
- Constituency: Buenos Aires

Personal details
- Born: 22 January 1959 (age 67)
- Party: Frente de Todos

Claudia Beatriz Ormachea is an Argentine politician who is a member of the Chamber of Deputies of Argentina. She worked as a social psychologist prior to her election in 2019.
