= María de las Mercedes Joury =

Argentine politician

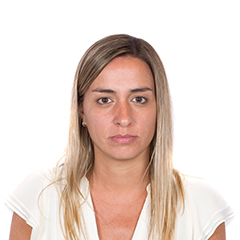

Member of the Chamber of Deputies of Argentina

Personal details
- Born: 28 October 1982 (age 43)
- Party: Republican Proposal
- Occupation: Political Scientist

María de las Mercedes Joury is an Argentine politician who is a member of the Chamber of Deputies.

== Biography ==
Joury worked in various political jobs before she was elected in 2019.
