= Fabián Borda =

Argentine politician

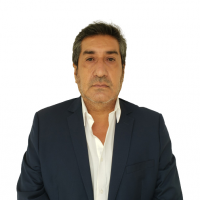

Member of the Chamber of Deputies of Argentina
- Incumbent
- Assumed office 16 December 2019

Personal details
- Born: July 22, 1966 (age 59)
- Party: Frente de Todos
- Occupation: AFIP DGA Employee

Fabián Borda is an Argentine politician who is a member of the Chamber of Deputies of Argentina.

== Biography ==
He was elected in 2021.
