= Sebastián García De Luca =

Argentine politician

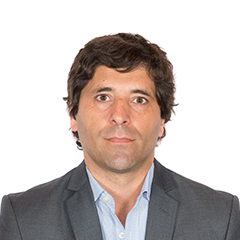

National Deputy
- Incumbent
- Assumed office 10 December 2019
- Constituency: Buenos Aires Province

Personal details
- Born: 9 May 1980 (age 45)
- Party: Juntos por el Cambio

Sebastián García De Luca is an Argentine politician who was a member of the Chamber of Deputies from 2019 to 2023. He was elected in the Juntos por el Cambio list in Buenos Aires Province.
