= Alicia Aparicio =

Argentine politician

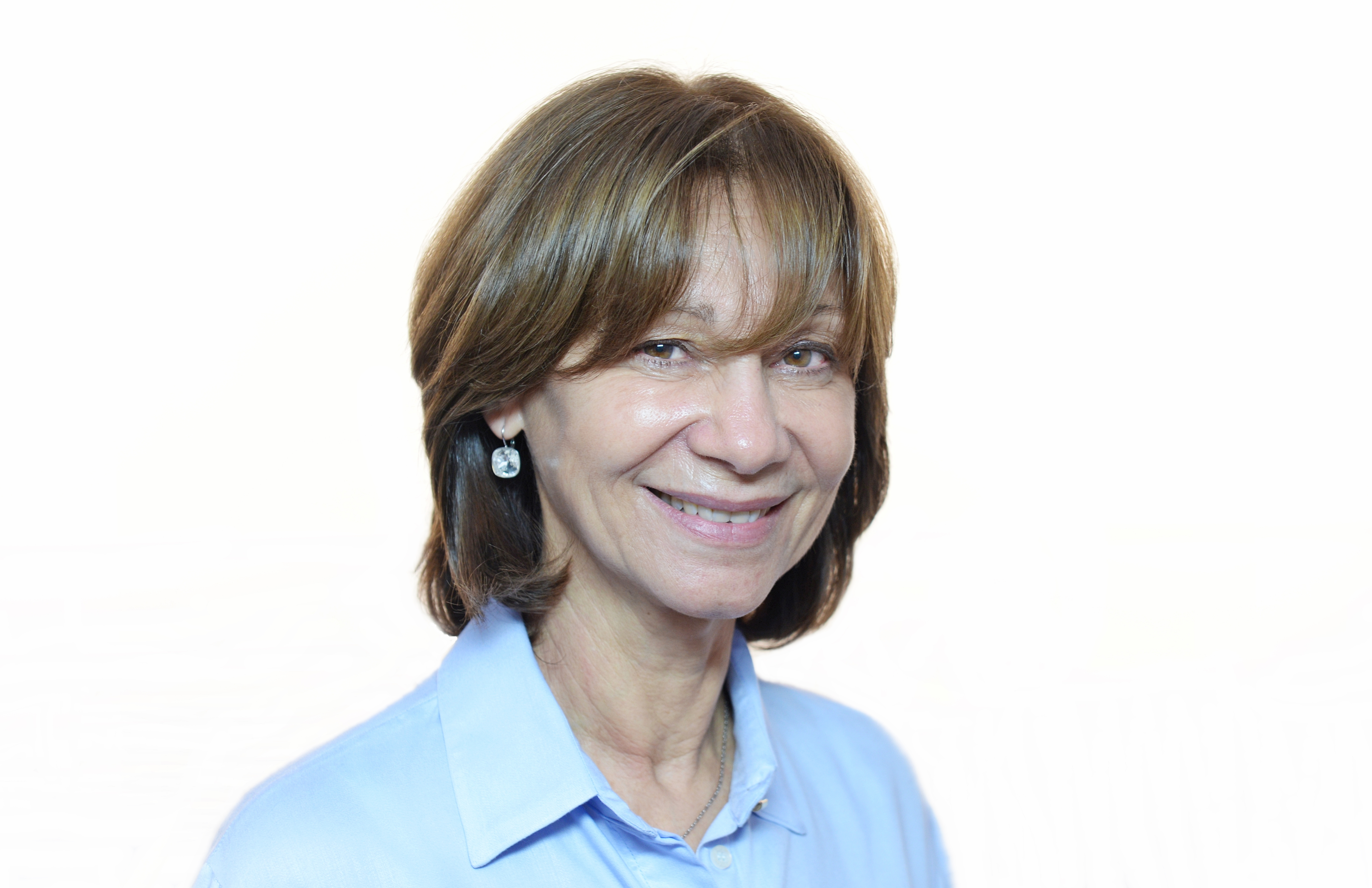

National Deputy
- Incumbent
- Assumed office 10 December 2019
- Constituency: Buenos Aires

Personal details
- Born: 14 September 1954 (age 71) San Fernando, Buenos Aires Province, Argentina
- Party: Justicialist Party (until 2013); Renewal Front (since 2013)
- Other political affiliations: United for a New Alternative (2015–2017); Frente de Todos (2019–present)
- Education: University of Buenos Aires

Alicia Noemí Aparicio (born 14 September 1954) is an Argentine politician, currently serving as National Deputy representing Buenos Aires Province. A member of the Renewal Front, she was elected in 2019 as part of the Frente de Todos. Aparicio previously served as a member of the City Council of San Fernando.

== Early and personal life ==
Aparicio was born on 14 September 1954 in San Fernando, in the Greater Buenos Aires conurbation. Her parents were politically involved in the Peronist Movement, and her father was a political prisoner and later a desaparecido during the last military dictatorship. She was raised in Villa del Totoral, Córdoba. Aparicio became politically active in the Peronist Youth. She studied Economics at the University of Buenos Aires.

Aparicio is married to Luis Andreotti, intendente (mayor) of San Fernando from 2011 to 2019. Aparicio and Andreotti have two children, María Eva and Juan Francisco Andreotti, the latter of which succeeded his father as mayor of San Fernando in 2019. Aparicio is also the sister of Santiago Aparicio, a member of the San Fernando City Council and vice president of Club Atlético Tigre.

== Political career ==
Upon her husband's election as mayor of San Fernando in 2011, Aparicio was appointed Secretary of Education, Culture, Sports and Social Assistance. Later, she was Secretary of Public Health, Human Development and Environmental Policies. In the 2017 local elections, Aparicio headed the Renewal Front list to the City Council; she was elected.

Aparicio ran for a seat in the Argentine Chamber of Deputies in the 2019 legislative election; she was the 16th candidate in the Frente de Todos list in Buenos Aires Province. The list received 51.64% of the vote, and Aparicio was elected.

As a national deputy, Aparicio formed part of the parliamentary commissions on Population and Human Development, Finances, Education, Economy, Municipal Affairs, Agriculture and Livestock, and Communications. She was a supporter of the 2020 Voluntary Interruption of Pregnancy bill, which legalized abortion in Argentina.

== Electoral history ==
Electoral history of Alicia Aparicio
Election	Office	List	#	District	Votes			Result	Ref.
Election	Office	List	#	District	Total	%	P.	Result	Ref.
2019	National Deputy	Frente de Todos	16	Buenos Aires Province	5,113,359	52.64%	1st (Note: Presented on an electoral list. The data shown represents the share of the vote the entire party/alliance received in that constituency.)	Elected	
