= María Eugenia Catalfamo =

Argentine politician (born 1987)

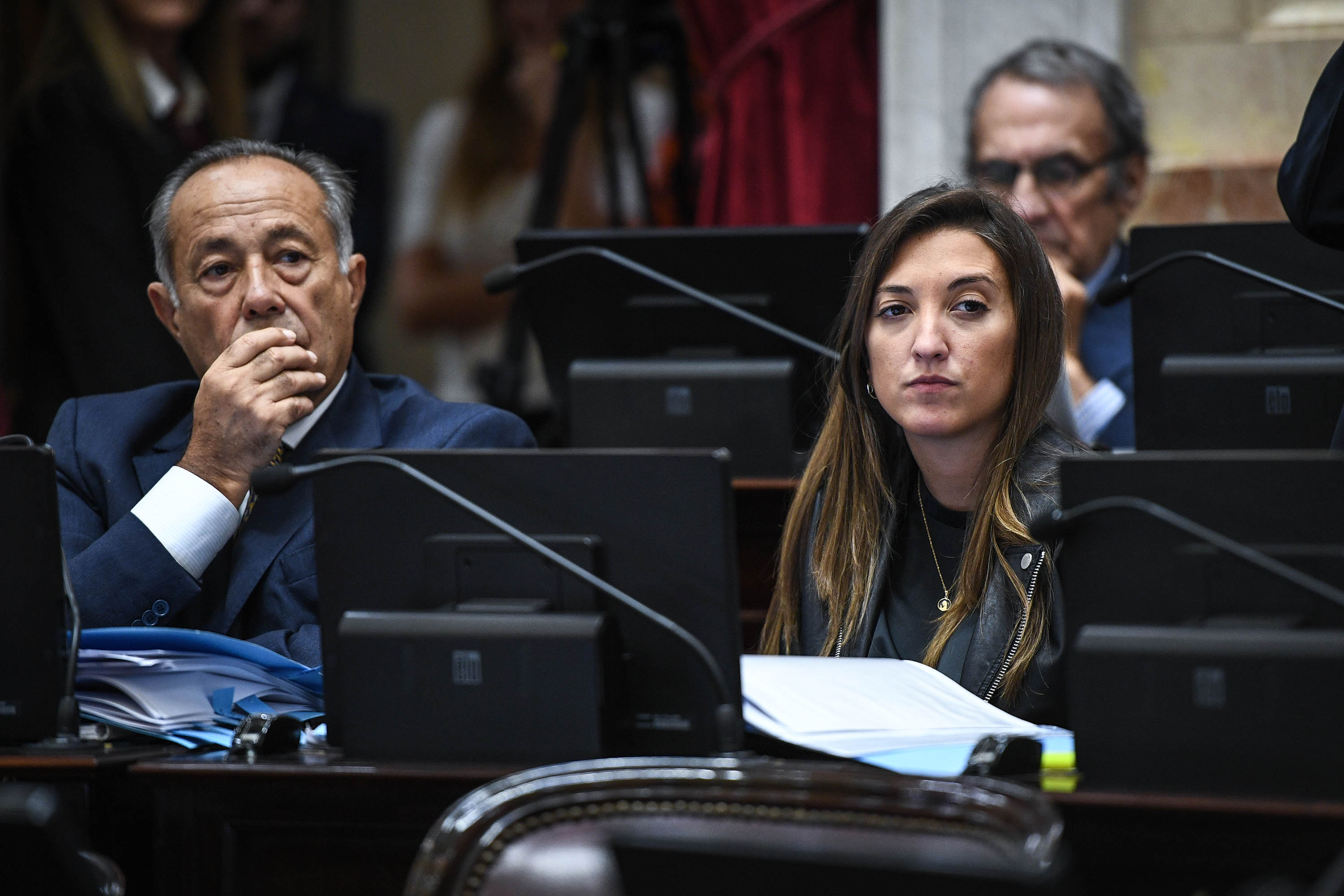

National Senator
- In office 10 December 2017 – 10 December 2023
- Constituency: San Luis

Personal details
- Born: 4 October 1987 (age 38) San Luis, Argentina
- Party: Justicialist Party
- Other political affiliations: Federal Commitment (since 2017); Frente de Todos (since 2019)
- Education: National University of Córdoba
- Profession: Journalist, politician

María Eugenia Catalfamo (born 4 October 1987) is an Argentine journalist and politician served as a National Senator for San Luis Province. A member of the Justicialist Party, Catalfamo was elected in 2017 and currently sits in the Frente de Todos parliamentary bloc.

== Early life and education ==
Catalfamo was born on 4 October 1987 in San Luis, Argentina. She finished high school at Instituto Aleluya, and later studied social communication at the National University of Córdoba (UNC), graduating 2012. From 2012 to 2013, she worked as a journalist for Agencia de Noticias San Luis, San Luis Province's state-owned news agency. She was also a writer for Vivir Urbano magazine from 2013 to 2015. From 2015 to 2017, she headed the press department of the Universidad de La Punta.

== Political career ==
From 2013 to 2015, she was chief of press and protocol of the San Luis Province Ministry of Security. Later, in May 2017, she was appointed as State Secretary of Youth of San Luis by Governor Alberto Rodríguez Saá.

That same year, Catalfamo was the second candidate in the Justicialist Party list to the National Senate in San Luis, behind Adolfo Rodríguez Saá. The PJ list was the most voted in the province, with 55.48% of the vote, and took the two seats for the majority. She originally formed part of the dissident Justicialist Unity bloc, alongside Rodríguez Saá. In March 2019, she broke away from the Justicialist Unity bloc, forming a single-member bloc by the name of "San Luis Justicialism". Following the 2019 general election, both Rodríguez Saá and Catalfamo became part of the Frente de Todos bloc.

As a national senator, she formed part of the parliamentary commissions on Industry and Commerce, Rights and Guarantees, Population and Human Development, Science and Technology, Women's Affairs, and General Legislation. During the 2018 vote on the Voluntary Interruption of Pregnancy Bill, which would have legalised abortion in Argentina, Catalfamo was the only senator to be absent in the session. Two years later, when the bill was once again debated by the Senate, Catalfamo was present and voted in favour.
