= Graciela Landriscini =

Argentine politician

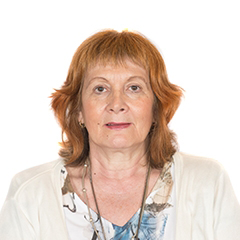

National Deputy
- In office 10 December 2019 – 10 December 2023
- Constituency: Río Negro

Personal details
- Born: 16 May 1952 (age 74) Bahía Blanca, Argentina
- Party: Justicialist Party
- Other political affiliations: Front for Victory (2013–2017); Unidad Ciudadana (2017–2019); Frente de Todos (2019–present)
- Education: Universidad Nacional del Sur

Susana Graciela Landriscini (born 16 May 1952) is an Argentine economist, professor, researcher and politician. A member of the Justicialist Party, Landriscini was elected in 2019 and as a National Deputy in Río Negro.

Landriscini is a researcher in the National Scientific and Technical Research Council (Conicet), specialized in economic planning and development. She served as Dean of the National University of Comahue (UNCo) Faculty of Economics and Administration in Neuquén, and as Dean of the Centro Universitario Regional Zona Atlántica, the UNCo campus in Viedma.

== Early life and career ==
Landriscini was born on 16 May 1952 in Bahía Blanca, in Southern Buenos Aires Province. She attained her licenciatura on Economic Sciences at the Universidad Nacional del Sur in 1974. She moved to Viedma, Río Negro shortly before the 1976 coup d'état. Following the return of democracy in 1983, Landriscini became employed at the National University of Comahue (UNCo), and rose through the academic ranks to become a professor of economic theory at the Faculty of Economics and Administration.

At the UNCo, Landriscini has served as Dean of the Faculty of Economics and Administration, and of the Centro Universitario Regional Zona Atlántica, the university's campus in Viedma. She has also been Secretary of Institutional Planning and Development at the UNCo rectorate.

Landriscini is in a relationship with José Luis Valicenti, and has three children.

== Political career ==
Landriscini has been active in politics throughout her career, and served as a member of the local Justicialist Party Congress in Cipolletti. She also served as Parliamentary Secretary of the Justicialist Party parliamentary bloc in the Río Negro Provincial Legislature.

In the 2019 legislative election, Landriscini ran in the Frente de Todos list to the Chamber of Deputies in Río Negro as the second candidate, behind General Roca mayor Martín Soria. The Frente de Todos list was the most voted, with 45.21% of the vote, and both Soria and Landriscini were elected. She was sworn in on 4 December 2019.

As a national deputy, Landriscini formed part of the parliamentary commissions on Economy, Education, Small and Medium-sized Companies, Industry, Budgets and Treasury, Science and Technology, and Regional Economies and Development. She was also a supporter of the 2020 Voluntary Interruption of Pregnancy bill, which legalized abortion in Argentina.
