= Carlos Américo Selva =

Argentine politician

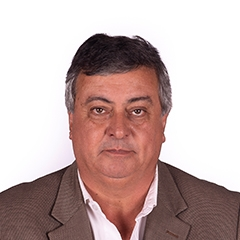

Member of the Chamber of Deputies of Argentina
- Incumbent
- Assumed office 10/12/2019

Personal details
- Born: March 5, 1958 (age 68)
- Party: Frentes de Todos
- Children: 3

Carlos Américo Selva is an Argentine politician who is a member of the Chamber of Deputies of Argentina.

== Biography ==
He was elected in 2019.
