= Leonor Martínez Villada =

Argentine politician (born 1950)

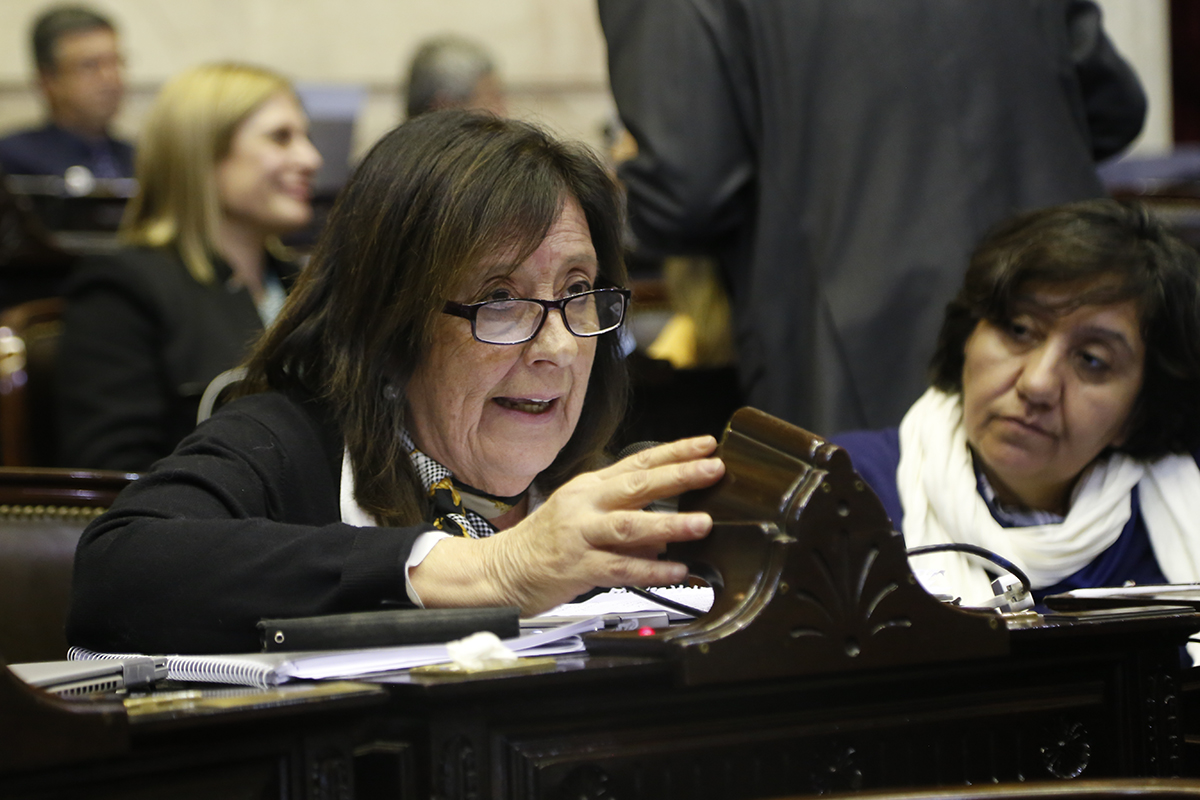

National Deputy
- Incumbent
- Assumed office 10 December 2015
- Constituency: Córdoba

Personal details
- Born: 5 June 1950 (age 75) Córdoba, Argentina
- Party: Civic Coalition ARI
- Other political affiliations: Juntos por el Cambio (2015–present)

Leonor María Martínez Villada (born 5 June 1950) is an Argentine politician, currently serving as National Deputy elected in Córdoba since 2015. She is a member of the Civic Coalition ARI.

Martínez Villada was born in the City of Córdoba. She is married and has four children. She has worked as a housewife.

Martínez Villada became politically active in the Movimiento Humanista de Resistencia y Construcción, led by Héctor "Toty" Flores, organized within the Civic Coalition ARI. She ran for a seat in the Chamber of Deputies in the 2015 legislative election, as the fourth candidate in the Cambiemos list in Córdoba Province. The list came first in the general election with 49.83% of the vote, and Martínez Villada was elected. Martínez Villada was re-elected in the 2019 legislative election, again occupying the fourth place in the Juntos por el Cambio list. The list was the most voted once again, with 51.32% of the vote.

As deputy, Martínez Villada formed part of the parliamentary commissions on Social Action and Public Health, Communications, Natural Resources, Human Rights and Guarantees, Cooperative Affairs and NGOs, Women and Diversity, and Labour Legislation. She was an opponent of the legalization of abortion in Argentina, voting against the two Voluntary Interruption of Pregnancy bills that passed the Chamber, in 2018 and 2020.
