= Víctor Hugo Romero =

Argentinean politician

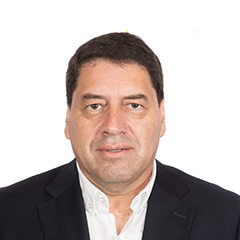

Member of the Chamber of Deputies of Argentina
- Incumbent
- Assumed office 10 December 2021
- Constituency: Cordoba, Argentina

Personal details
- Born: 26 March 1953 (age 73)
- Party: Radical Civic Union

Víctor Hugo Romero is an Argentine politician who is a member of the Chamber of Deputies of Argentina.

== Biography ==
Romero worked as an accountant before he was elected in 2021.
