= Marcos Cleri =

Argentine politician

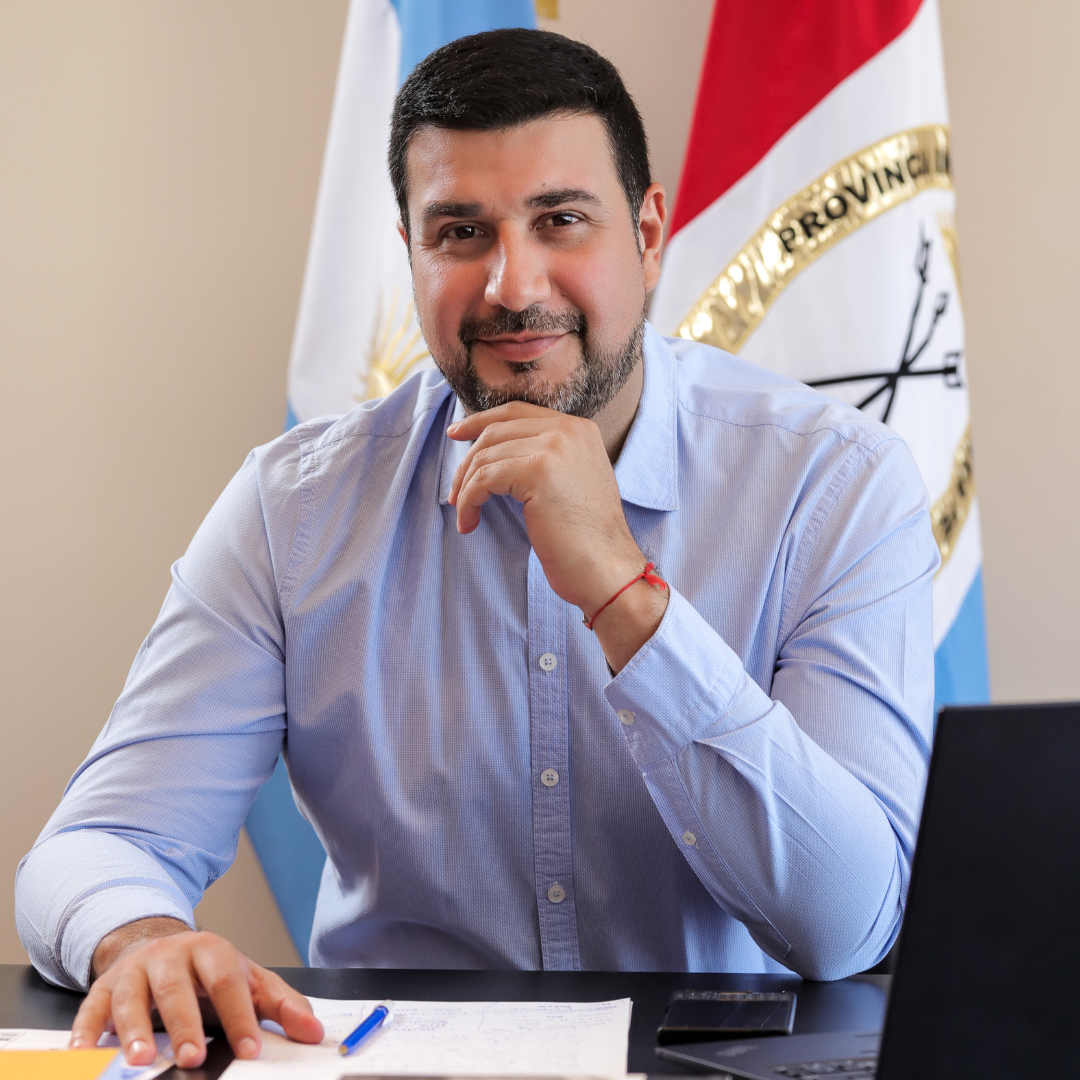

Member of the Chamber of Deputies of Argentina
- Incumbent
- Assumed office 10 December 2019
- Constituency: Santa Fe

Personal details
- Born: 12 January 1982 (age 44)
- Party: Frente de Todos
- Occupation: Lawyer

Marcos Cleri is an Argentine politician who is a member of the Chamber of Deputies of Argentina.

== Biography ==
Cleri was elected in 2019.
