= Graciela Caselles =

Argentine politician

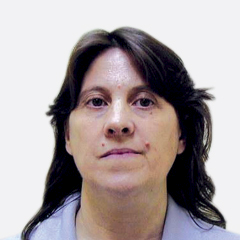

Member of the Chamber of Deputies of Argentina
- Constituency: San Juan

Personal details
- Born: 5 October 1966 (age 59)
- Party: Frente de Todos
- Occupation: Psychopedagogy

Graciela Caselles is an Argentine politician who is a member of the Chamber of Deputies of Argentina.

== Biography ==
Caselles worked in Psychopedagogy before she was elected in 2019.
