= Carlos Ybrhain Ponce =

Argentine politician

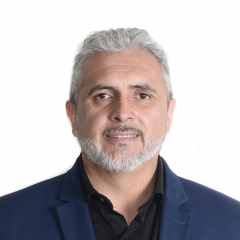

Member of the Chamber of Deputies of Argentina
- Constituency: San Luis, Argentina

Personal details
- Born: February 11, 1970 (age 56)
- Party: Frente de Todos

Carlos Ybrhain Ponce is an Argentine politician who is a member of the Chamber of Deputies of Argentina.

== Biography ==
He was elected in 2019 for San Luis, Argentina.
