= Adriana Noemí Ruarte =

Argentine politician

Member of the Chamber of Deputies of Argentina
- Incumbent
- Assumed office 10 December 2019 - 9 December 2023
- Constituency: Cordoba

Personal details
- Born: May 10, 1969 (age 56)
- Party: Republican Proposal
- Occupation: Teacher

Adriana Noemí Ruarte is an Argentine politician who is a member of the Chamber of Deputies of Argentina.

She was a teacher before her election in 2019.
