= Marcos Carasso =

Argentine politician and kinesiologist

Member of the Chamber of Deputies of Argentina
- In office 16 December 2021 – 10 December 2023
- Constituency: Cordoba

Personal details
- Born: 19 January 1970 (age 56)
- Party: Radical Civic Union
- Occupation: Kinesiologist

Marcos Carasso is an Argentine politician who was a member of the Chamber of Deputies of Argentina.

== Biography ==
Carasso worked as a kinesiologist before he was elected in 2021.

Carasso was a candidate for the post of Vice Gobernor of Córdoba Province in the 2023 provincial elections.
