= Gabriela Lena =

Argentine politician

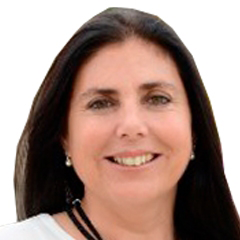

Member of the Chamber of Deputies of Argentina
- Incumbent
- Assumed office 10 December 2019
- Constituency: Entre Rios

Personal details
- Born: 7 February 1966 (age 60)
- Party: Entre Rios
- Spouse: Radical Civic Union
- Occupation: Clerk

Gabriela Lena (born February 7, 1966) is an Argentine politician who is a member of the Chamber of Deputies of Argentina.

== Biography ==
Lena worked as a clerk before she was elected in 2019.
