= Juan Martín (politician) =

Argentine politician

Member of the Chamber of Deputies of Argentina
- Incumbent
- Assumed office 10 December 2019
- Constituency: Santa Fe

Personal details
- Born: 18 October 1987 (age 38)
- Party: Radical Civic Union
- Occupation: Lawyer

Juan Martín is an Argentine politician who is a member of the Chamber of Deputies of Argentina.

== Biography ==
Martín worked as a lawyer before he was elected in 2019.
