= Cristina Pérez (reporter) =

Argentine television news journalist

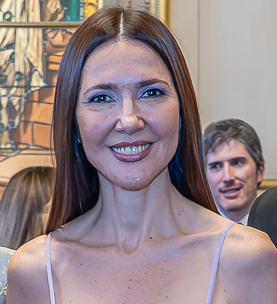
- Pérez in 2023
- Born: August 17, 1973 (age 53); San Miguel de Tucumán, Tucumán, Argentina
- Education: National University of Tucumán
- Occupation: Journalist
- Years active: 1990–present
- Notable credit: Telefe Noticias host (2002–present)
- Partner: Luis Petri (2021–present)
- Children: 1

Cristina Pérez (born August 17, 1973 in San Miguel de Tucumán) is an Argentine television news journalist. Since 2002, she has worked alongside Rodolfo Barilli, as news anchor of Telefe's Telefe Noticias a las 20 ("Telefe News at 8 PM").

== Career ==
Cristina Pérez is journalist, News Anchor, author and actress. She has a vast career as a journalist in the Argentine Media. She has been working in the national television for the last 27 years. She co-hosts Telefe Noticias prime time edition since 2002, in Telefe-ViacomCBS (Channel 11), the leading network. She also has her own daily radio show, "Confesiones", in Radio Mitre AM790, top radio in Argentina.

For her work as a journalist she's been awarded with four Martin Fierro Awards, (Television best female Journalist, Radio Best Journalist, Best Night Radio Show, Best TV Style News), five Tato Awards as best Journalist and anchor woman, Women to Watch, and Security Award as journalist of the year. As an author, Cristina has written two fiction books, El Jardin de los Delatores, her first novel, and Cuentos Inesperados, a short stories collection. Cristina runs her own website cristinaperez.com.ar where she publishes her daily interviews at Radio Mitre and a diverse range of articles including current affairs, travel chronicles, literature and opinion on different fields.

She frequently writes for newspapers and magazines as Revista Noticias, La Nación, Clarin and Perfil. Recently she's also been working for BBC Mundo, telling stories about Argentina from a regional perspective.

As a host of international summits and events she run Women to Watch Argentina, Girls 20, T-Solutions World Bank, Global Pact PNUD, Oracle Convention, Telefónica Summit, among others.

As an actress, she has played three major roles in Shakespearean performances at the Buenos Aires Shakespeare Festival. She has degrees in History (UNT) and English Literature (University of London and Oxford Continuing Education). She is a member of FOPEA (Foro de Periodismo Argentino), an NGO that advocates freedom of expression and better professional standards for journalists. She's also a member of CARI KOL (Key Opinion Leaders at Argentina Council of International Relations). A deep love of words underpins her vocation as a journalist, author, and actress.

== Awards ==
=== Nominations ===
- 2013 Martín Fierro Awards
  - Best female TV host (for Telefe Noticias)
