= Rubén Manzi =

Argentine politician

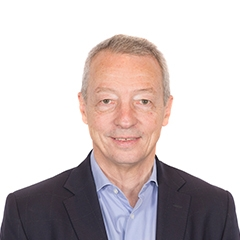

National Deputy
- In office 10 December 2019 – 10 December 2023
- Constituency: Catamarca

Personal details
- Born: 1 December 1954 (age 71)
- Party: Civic Coalition ARI
- Other political affiliations: Juntos por el Cambio (2015–2023)
- Occupation: Doctor

Rubén Manzi (born 1 December 1954) is an Argentine physician and politician who was a member of the Chamber of Deputies of Argentina, elected in Catamarca Province. He is a member of the Civic Coalition ARI.

== Biography ==
He worked as a doctor before being elected in 2019.
