= Gerardo Cipolini =

Argentine politician

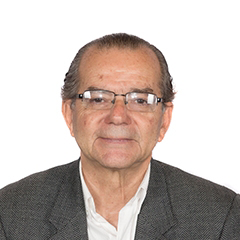

National Deputy
- Incumbent
- Assumed office 10 December 2019
- Constituency: Chaco

Personal details
- Born: 29 March 1943 (age 83)
- Party: Radical Civic Union
- Occupation: Accountant

Gerardo Cipolini is an Argentine politician who is a member of the Chamber of Deputies of Argentina.

== Biography ==
Cipolini worked as an accountant before he was elected in 2019.
