= Ricardo Daniel Daives =

Argentine politician

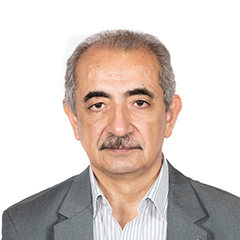

Member of the Chamber of Deputies of Argentina
- Incumbent
- Assumed office 10 December 2019
- Constituency: Santiago del Estero

Personal details
- Born: 6 January 1950 (age 76)
- Party: Frente de Todos

Ricardo Daniel Daives is an Argentine politician and lawyer who is a member of the Chamber of Deputies of Argentina since 2019.
