= Mónica Edith Frade =

Argentine politician

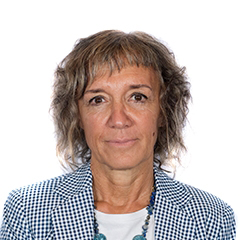

Member of the Chamber of Deputies of Argentina
- Incumbent
- Assumed office 10 December 2019
- Constituency: Buenos Aires

Personal details
- Born: 29 September 1958 (age 67)
- Party: Coalicion Civic
- Occupation: Lawyer

Mónica Edith Frade is an Argentine politician who is a member of the Chamber of Deputies.

== Biography ==
Frade worked as a lawyer before she was elected in 2019.
