= Lucio Yapor =

Argentine politician

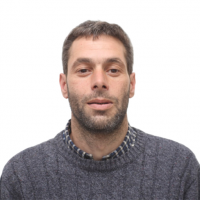

National Deputy
- In office 26 October 2021 – 10 December 2023
- Constituency: Buenos Aires

Personal details
- Born: 14 July 1983 (age 42)
- Party: Frente de Todos
- Occupation: agricultural production technician

Lucio Yapor is an Argentine politician who served as a member of the Chamber of Deputies of Argentina from 2021 to 2023.

== Biography ==
Yapor worked in the field of agriculture before assuming office in Congress.
