= Eduardo Fernández (Argentine politician) =

Argentine politician (born 1952)

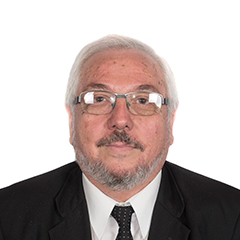

National Deputy
- In office 10 December 2019 – 10 December 2023
- Constituency: Córdoba

Personal details
- Born: 9 June 1952 (age 74) Córdoba, Argentina
- Party: Solidary Party
- Other political affiliations: New Encounter (2011–2017); Unidad Ciudadana (2017–2019); Frente de Todos (2019–present)
- Education: National University of Córdoba

Eduardo Gabriel Fernández (born 9 June 1952) is an Argentine public accountant and politician, who served as National Deputy representing Córdoba. A member of the Solidary Party (PSOL), Fernández was elected in 2019 for the Frente de Todos and finished his term in 2023. He presides the Córdoba chapter of the PSOL.

== Early life and education ==
Fernández was born on 9 June 1952 in the City of Córdoba. He studied public accounting at the National University of Córdoba.

== Political career ==
Fernández has done his political career in the Solidary Party (PSOL). In 2011, Fernández was the New Encounter candidate to the governorship of Córdoba Province; he garnered 0.93% of the vote and landed fifth in the election.

At the 2017 legislative election, Fernández was the third candidate in the Córdoba Ciudadana alliance list, headed by Pablo Carro. The list received 9.71% of the vote, enough for only Carro to be elected. Fernández ran again in the 2019 legislative election, this time as the first candidate in the Frente de Todos list, alongside Gabriela Estévez. The list received 22.31% of the vote, and both Fernández and Estévez were elected.

As a national deputy, Fernández formed part of the parliamentary commissions on Natural Resources, Industry, Finances, Economy, Communications, Science and Technology, Analysis and Following of Tax Norms, and Small and Medium-sized Companies. He was a vocal supporter of the legalization of abortion in Argentina, votin in favour of the 2020 Voluntary Interruption of Pregnancy bill that passed the Argentine Congress.
