= Miguel Nanni =

Argentine politician

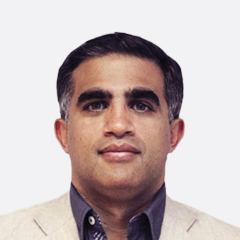

Member of the Chamber of Deputies of Argentina
- Incumbent
- Assumed office 10 December 2019
- Constituency: Salta

Personal details
- Born: 6 May 1977 (age 49)
- Party: Radical Civic Union
- Occupation: Lawyer

Miguel Nanni is an Argentine politician who is a member of the Chamber of Deputies of Argentina.

== Biography ==
Nanni worked as a lawyer before he was elected in 2019.
