= Universidad de Morón =

Private university in Morón, Argentina

Coordinates: 34°38′48″S 58°37′12″W

University of Morón
- Universidad de Morón
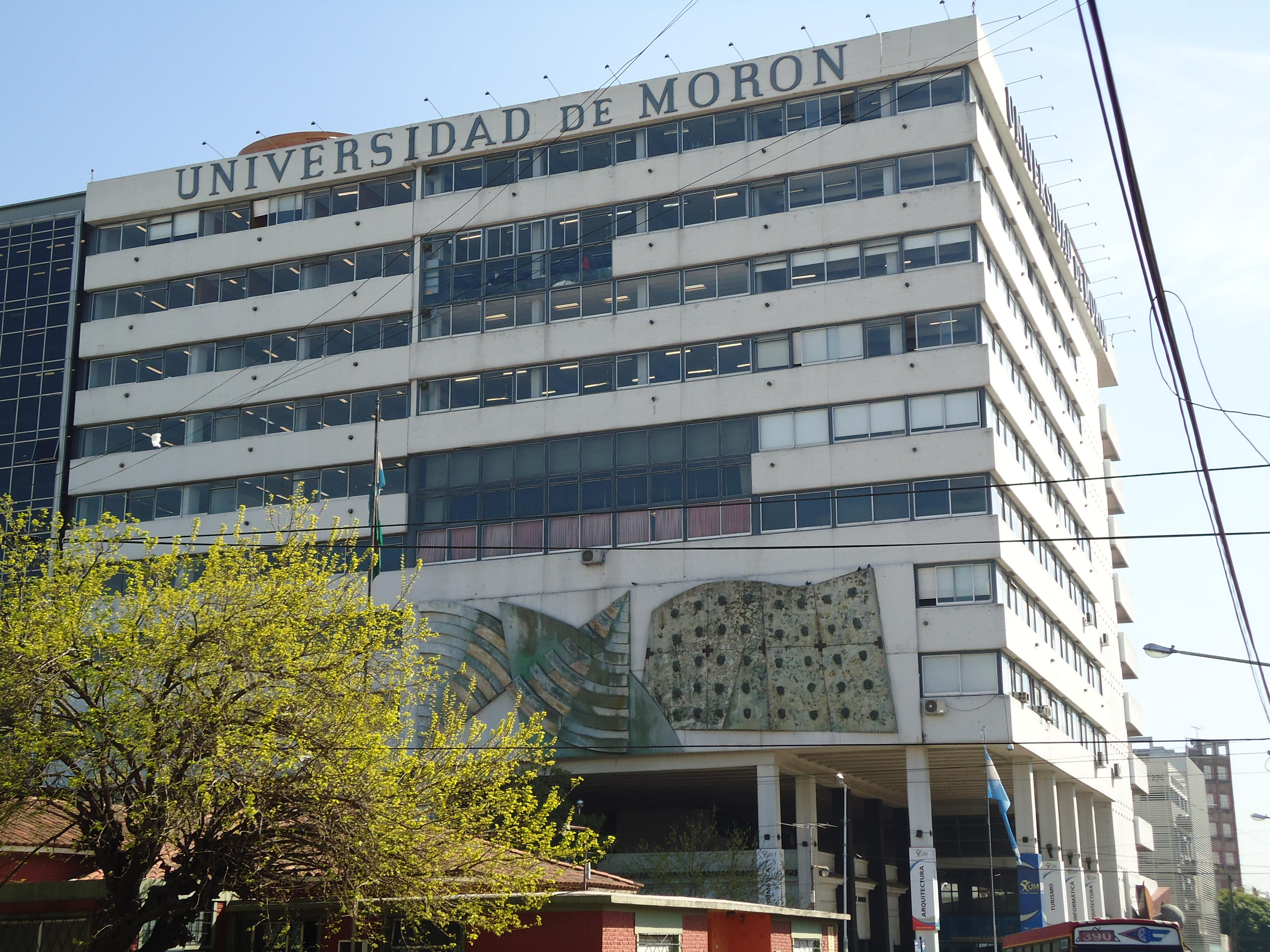
- Type: Private
- Established: 1960
- Rector: Dr. Héctor Noberto Porto Lemma
- Location: Morón, Buenos Aires, Argentina
- Campus: Urban
- Website: http://www.unimoron.edu.ar/

The Universidad de Morón (University of Morón) is a private university located in Morón in the Buenos Aires Province of Argentina. It was founded on May 18, 1960, and was officially recognized through Presidential Decree No. 4958 on August 2, 1972, finally being incorporated into the regime of private universities with Decree No. 1173 on September 11, 1981.

Ten faculties offer courses on Agronomy and Agro-alimentary Sciences; Architecture, Design, Art and Urbanism; Law, Political and Social Sciences; Exact, Chemical, and Material Sciences; Philosophy, Education Sciences, and Humanities; Information, Communication Sciences, and Special Techniques; Engineering; Medicine; Applied Tourism Sciences and Population.

== History ==
The Universidad de Morón was inaugurated on May 18, 1960. At the time of its inauguration, the university possessed two academic units: the School of Law and Social Sciences and the School of Arts.
