= Valores para mi País =

Values for my Country Valores para mi País
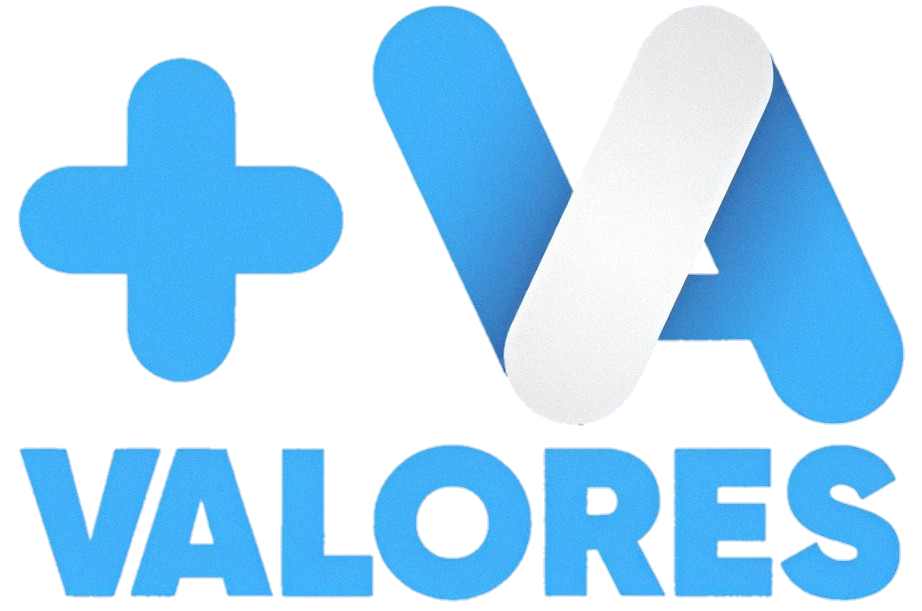
- Leader: Cynthia Hotton
- Founded: 2009
- Split from: Republican Proposal
- Membership: NOS front (2019) +Valores (2021); Juntos por el Cambio (currently)
- Ideology: Conservatism; Anti-feminism; Anti-kirchnerism; Anti-corruption; Anti-LGBT; Anti-abortion; Neoconservatism; Christian democracy Evangelicalism; Pluriconfedentialism; Social market economy
- Political position: Centre-right to far-right
- Religion: Catholicism
- International affiliation: The Movement

Website
- https://www.valoresparamipais.com/

Values for my Country, Values, +Values or More Values, is an Argentinian political party. Globally it is affiliated with the Alternative Right. It was created in 2009 after breaking away from the Republican Proposal party. It is led by the evangelical Cynthia Hotton. He is currently part of the Juntos por el Cambio alliance. It has provisional political personality in the Province of Buenos Aires, San Juan, and in Río Negro.

== History ==
=== 2009 ===
Initially, Values for my Country emerged as a bloc in the Chamber of Deputies, based on a detachment from the Republican Proposal party. In 2009 it would be recognized as a district political party.

=== 2015 ===
Cynthia Hotton on January 29, 2015 launched "Values for my Country" as a national party, in La Rural in Buenos Aires. More than a thousand people from different provinces were present along with various political leaders who supported the initiative. Other politicians like Sérgio Massa and Julio Cobos showed their support.

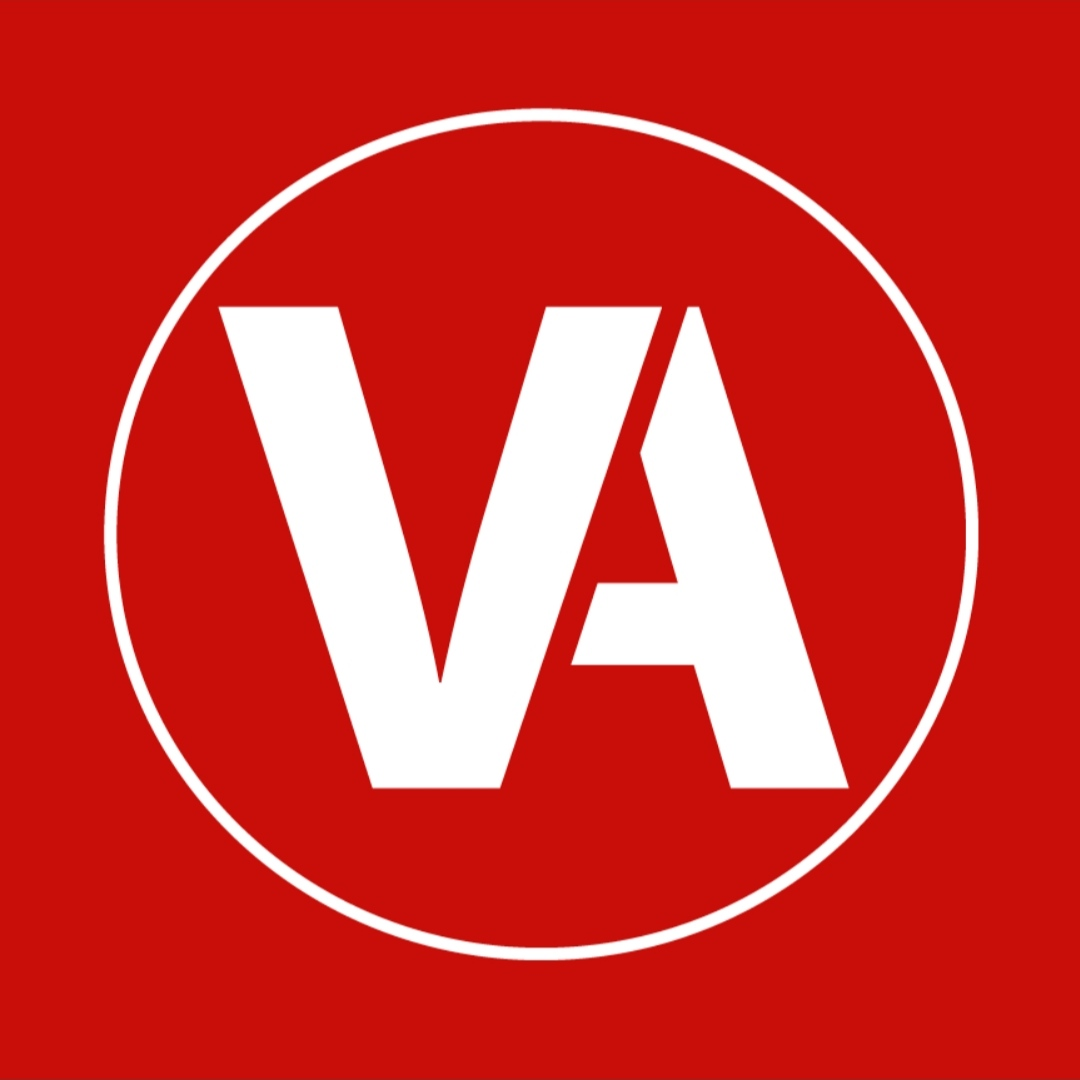

=== 2019 ===
In 2019, he was part of the extreme-right alliance NOS Front together with the NOS party, Republican Force, People's Conservative Party, etc. Qualifying for the general elections, falling behind the Left Front and the Workers. Applying for vice presidency with Cynthia Hotton, and José Gómez Centurión would go as president for the NOS party. "For reasons of machismo", as the president of the party points out, she would later leave the coalition.

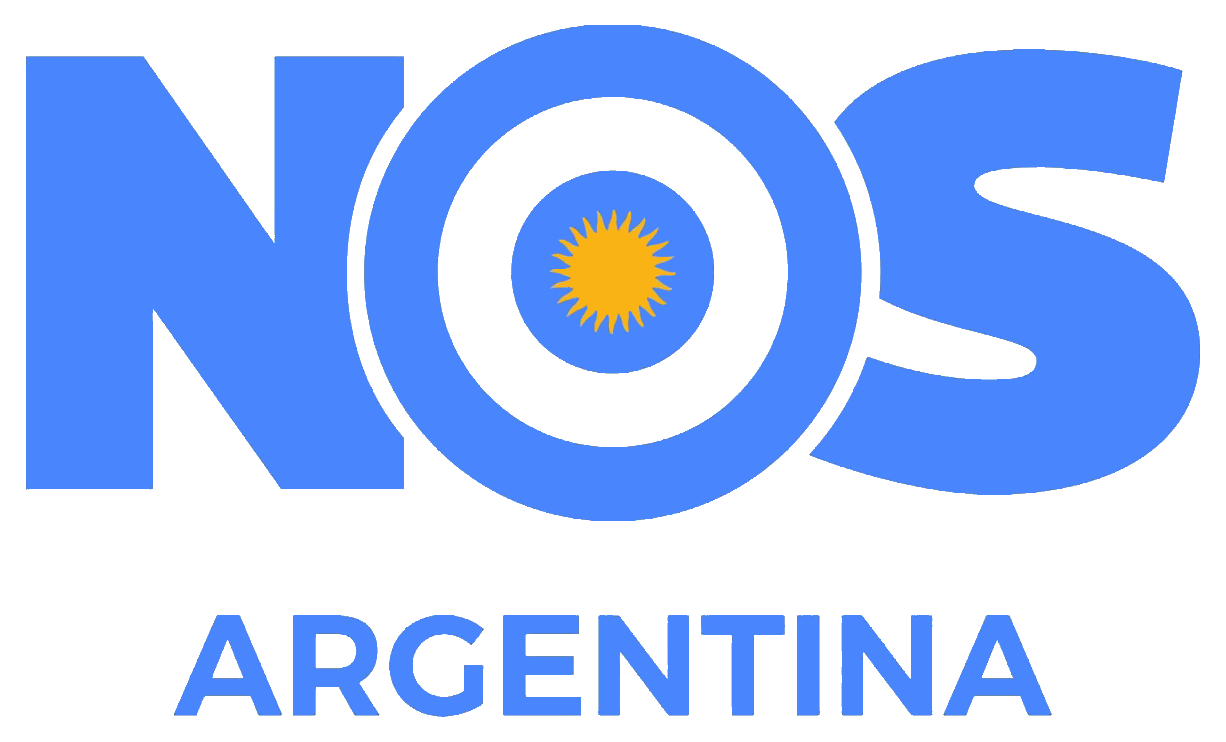

=== 2021 ===
In 2021, party leader Cynthia Hotton decided to form a right-wing and far-right alliance together with the parties, UCEDE, Autonomist Party, United Republicans, Democratic Party, Liberal Party and Avanza Libertad called the "Vamos Front". Valores para mi País together with the Autonomist Party would participate together in the internship of the same front. In the end, the alliance would dissolve due to the refusal of José Antonio Romero Feris to participate in it.

Then, they formed a center-right alliance with the parties, Anti-Corruption Party and Celestial and White Union, called +Values. When they passed the elections, other right-wing parties offered their support, although in the general elections they failed to obtain any seats.

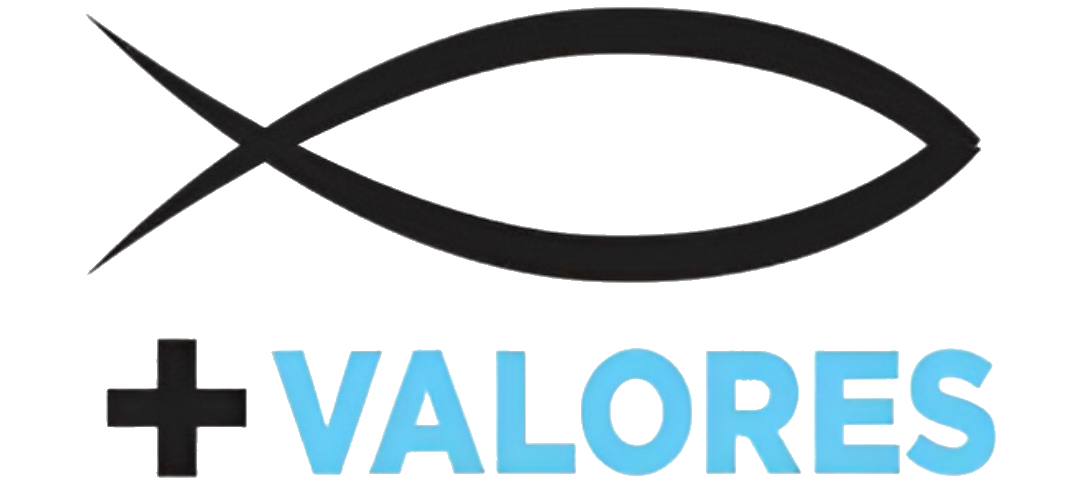

=== 2022 ===
At the end of 2022, in the act for the inauguration of Guevara street in the Playón de Chacarita, Horacio Rodríguez Larreta officially presented Cynthia Hotton as part of the Buenos Aires Executive, making her preside over the Social Council, and highlighted: "He defends the value of life, of the family, of the truth." Including "+Valores" within the JxC coalition and the Buenos Aires government.

=== 2023 ===
Cynthia Hotton, on July 4, 2023, launched her candidacy for lieutenant governor of the province of Buenos Aires. In a conjunctive formula with Diego Santilli. Staying in the Together for Change coalition.

== Ideology ==
They identify themselves as evangelical Christians and pro-lifes, of center and center-right; however, the media place them on the right or the far right. The party has maintained ties with the ultra-conservative politician Steve Bannon.

Similarly, the media label them as conservatives, something that Cynthia Hotton, the president, has denied multiple times.

According to their main leader, they advocate a social market economy with a present and articulating state. He also expressed his support for the labor reform, which the different right-wing parties propose in Argentina.

== Proposals ==
On their platform they presented the following axes:

=== Human Rights ===
- Defend life in all its stages, from conception to natural death.
- Guarantee the right to life and health of both the pregnant mother and the unborn child.
- Promote and protect the family as a fundamental institution of society.
- Promote policies to reduce malnutrition and poverty throughout the country, with special emphasis on early childhood.
- Propose effective solutions to violence and abuse against women and children.
- Defend the rights of women, especially the rights to equal opportunities, in opposition to exclusive feminism, which focuses on the promotion of abortion.
- Guarantee the quality of life of the elderly.
- Promote the inclusion of people with disabilities.
- Guarantee palliative care at the end of life.
- Guarantee each immigrant full access to rights based on the fulfillment of their duties as citizens.
- Reject gender ideology.

=== Education ===
- Recognize the family as the first and main educator and promote parental participation.
- Respect and have respect for personal and institutional freedom to educate in accordance with personal and community convictions.
- Promote a sexual education that integrates affective, ethical and moral aspects free of ideologies.
- Privilege Education as a fundamental policy for the development of the country, with better budgets, strategies and educational plans and a permanent qualification of directors and teachers.

=== Economy ===
- Promote work as an indispensable means for personal development.
- Carry out a comprehensive reform of the tax system, favoring job creation and an orderly transition from social plans to jobs.
- Promote exports in order to balance the trade balance.
- Control the fiscal deficit and indebtedness.

=== Political reform ===
- Promote an electoral reform for the promotion of the single ballot and the elimination of the sheet lists.
- Promote transparency and fight against corruption, promoting the laws of clean record and extinction of domain.

=== Safety ===
- Comply with the provisions of the penal code: that the offender pays his sentence.
- Ensure free and safe circulation in the streets.
- Caring for victims of crime.
- Extradite foreign criminals.
- Combat drug trafficking, prevent drug use and work on the recovery of addicts.
- Promote a reform of the security system to face new types of threats from international organized crime: drug trafficking, arms trafficking, money laundering, terrorism, trafficking, etc.

== Electoral results ==
=== Presidential Elections ===
Year	Formula		Primaries		First lap		Result	Note
Year	President	Vice president	votes	%	votes	%	Result	Note
2019	Juan José Gómez Centurión	Cynthia Hotton	670 162	2.62	443 507	1.71	Not Elected	NOS Front

=== National Congress ===
Deputies
Year	Votes	%	Banks obtained	Note
2021	263,515	2.95	0 / 35	+Values

=== Provincial elections of the Province of Buenos Aires ===
Deputies
Year	Votes	%	Banks obtained	Note
2021	116,684	3%	0 / 20	+Values
