= Opinion polling for the 2019 Argentine general election =

This table provides a list of nationwide public opinion polls that have been conducted in the run-up to the 2019 Argentine general election, scheduled to take place on 27 October 2019, with a second round to take place on 24 November 2019, should no candidate obtain the necessary number of votes in the first round.

== Polls conducted since the submission of candidacies ==
The following opinion polls were conducted after the deadline for the submission of candidacies before the National Electoral Chamber, on 22 June 2019.

=== Primaries ===
Date	Pollster	Sample size	Alberto Fernández	Mauricio Macri	Roberto Lavagna	Nicolás Del Caño	José Luis Espert	Juan José G. Centurión	Undecided	Lead
30 September 2019	Opinaia	3000	48	30	7	2	3	2	3	18
11 August 2019	Primary Election	–	47.7	32.1	8.2	2.9	2.2	2.6	–	15.6
11-13 July 2019	Synopsis	2260	40.6	38.1	8.9	1.5	3.9	–	4.9	2.5
11 July 2019	Gustavo Córdoba y Asociados	1934	33.5	32.5	11.3	3.8	5.1	–	1.0	1
2-11 July 2019	Universidad de San Andrés	2260	29	25	5	3	3	1	15	4
29 June 2019	Meridional	1934	42.5	34.5	8.8	2.7	11.5	–	11.3	8
28 June 2019	Synopsis	2261	40.3	36.2	9.1	1.1	4.1	–	8.1	4.2
23 June 2019	CEOP	1500	43.7	32.3	9.3	2.1	3.9	–	8.7	11.4
23 June 2019	Trespuntozero	1400	42	33.4	7.9	0.9	2.5	2.5	6.9	8.6

== Polls conducted before the submission of candidacies ==
The following opinion polls were conducted before the deadline for the submission of candidacies before the National Electoral Chamber, on 22 June 2019.

=== First round ===
Date	Polling firm	Citizen's Unity				Let's Change		Federal Alternative			FIT	RxA
Date	Polling firm	Kirchner	Kicillof	Scioli	Rossi	Macri	Vidal	Massa	Lavagna	Urtubey	Del Caño	Solá
13 March 2019	Centro de Estudios de Opinión Pública	31.4	-	-	-	27.3	-	10.8	8.5	2.9	2.6	-
10 March 2019	Raúl Aragón & Asociados	28.4	-	-	-	26.9	-	10.9	9.1	9.7	4.1	-
7 March 2019	Universidad de San Andrés	23	-	-	-	24	-	5	11	6	-	-
8 March 2019	M&R Asociados / Query Argentina	27.9	-	-	-	26.9	-	-	12.1	-	5.3	-
8 March 2019	M&R Asociados / Query Argentina	27.8	-	-	-	-	30.2	-	11.4	-	5.1	-
8 March 2019	M&R Asociados / Query Argentina	-	-	-	-	27.4	-	-	21.7	-	10.2	-
8 March 2019	M&R Asociados / Query Argentina	-	-	-	-	-	29	-	20.1	-	10.6	-
8 March 2019	Oh! Panel	24	-	-	-	22	9	3	10	2	4.1	-
21 February 2019	Circuitos	33.8	-	-	-	29.4	-	6.1	8.7	-	5.8	-
17 February 2019	Hugo Haime & Asociados	37.7	-	-	-	27.1	-	19.3	-	-	5.9	-
17 February 2019	Hugo Haime & Asociados	41.6	-	-	-	26.7	-	-	-	12.9	7.6	-
17 February 2019	Hugo Haime & Asociados	41.8	-	-	-	26.7	-	-	14.6	-	5.8	-
12 February 2019	Ricardo Rouvier & Asociados	28.4	-	-	-	26.9	-	10.9	9.1	9.7	4.1	-
10 February 2019	Centro de Estudios de Opinión Pública	34.3	-	-	-	31.4	-	8.6	-	-	2.9	-
4 February 2019	M&R Asociados / Query Argentina	33.7	-	-	-	29.2	-	9.1	-	-	5.2	-
4 February 2019	Aragón y Asociados	30	-	-	-	29	-	13	-	-	-	-
2 February 2019	Consultora de Imagen y Gestión Política	34.96	-	-	-	28.16	-	6.51	14.47	-	-	-
27 January 2019	Ricardo Rouvier & Asociados	32.4	-	-	-	29.2	-	9.5	-	5.7	4.5	-
25 January 2019	Consultora de Imagen y Gestión Política	34.6	-	-	-	32.1	-	10	-	-	-	-
25 January 2019	Reyes Filadoro	34	-	-	-	28	-	9	-	-	-	-
25 January 2019	Del Franco	29.3	-	-	-	27.2	-	13.8	-	-	-	-
25 January 2019	Aresco	31.9	-	-	-	30.7	-	8.6	-	-	-	-
25 January 2019	Gustavo Córdoba y Asociados	38.2	-	-	-	34.6	-	8.5	-	-	-	-
23 January 2019	Opinaia	30	-	-	-	30	-	11	-	-	3	-
23 January 2019	Opinaia	30	-	-	-	30	-	-	11	-	4	-
23 January 2019	Opinaia	31	-	-	-	30	-	-	-	8	4	-
21 January 2019	Circuitos	33.2	-	-	-	30.1	-	9.8	-	-	6.4	-
15 January 2019	Gustavo Córdoba y Asociados	31.8	-	-	-	22.8	-	7.4	-	9	0.9	-
11 January 2019	Synopsis	27.6	-	-	-	29.1	-	6.7	13.1	2.8	2.2	-
11 January 2019	Synopsis	-	-	5.6	9.9	27.8	-	7.5	15.6	3.5	2.7	3.2
8 January 2019	Quality Politics Argentina	30.7	-	6.3	2.5	29.3	-	10.8	-	5.7	2.8	3.4
8 January 2019	Dicen	34	-	-	-	30	-	10	-	-	3	-
8 January 2019	Dicen	-	-	23	-	28	-	12	-	-	3	-
8 January 2019	Analogías	-	-	27.6	-	23	-	12	-	-	5.7	-
1 January 2019	Opinaia	26	-	-	-	27	-	11	-	-	4	-
1 January 2019	Opinaia	27	-	-	-	28	-	-	-	8	5	-
23 December 2018	Federico González y Asociados	27.7	-	4.2	-	29.2	-	14.1	-	6.1	3.4	2.7
23 December 2018	Federico González y Asociados	-	11.2	6.7	1.5	29.5	-	17.1	-	7.9	4.6	4.2
12 December 2018	Opina Argentina	34	-	-	-	30	-	11	-	5	5	-
3 December 2018	Ricardo Rouvier & Asociados	31.9	-	-	-	28.1	-	10	-	6.4	4.4	-
3 December 2018	Ricardo Rouvier & Asociados	38.9	-	-	-	37.9	-	-	-	-	-	-
2 December 2018	M&R Asociados / Query Argentina	29.1	-	-	-	28.4	-	9.1	-	-	5.5	-
29 November 2018	Gustavo Córdoba y Asociados	35.3	-	-	-	25.5	-	17.1	-	-	-	-
26 November 2018	Opinaia	28	-	-	-	28	-	-	-	8	4	-
26 November 2018	Opinaia	27	-	-	-	28	-	11	-	-	3	-
26 November 2018	Opinaia	27	-	-	-	-	30	12	-	-	4	-

=== Second round ===
Date	Polling firm	Citizen's Unity				Let's Change		Federal Alternative			RxA
Date	Polling firm	Kirchner	Kicillof	Scioli	Rossi	Macri	Vidal	Massa	Lavagna	Urtubey	Solá
13 March 2019	Centro de Estudios de Opinión Pública	37.4	-	-	-	34.3	-	-	-	-	-
10 March 2019	Hugo Haime y Asociados	51	-	-	-	39	-	-	-	-	-
10 March 2019	Hugo Haime y Asociados	-	-	-	-	32	-	55	-	-	-
10 March 2019	Hugo Haime y Asociados	-	-	-	-	34	-	-	50	-	-
10 March 2019	Hugo Haime y Asociados	-	-	-	-	33	-	-	-	49	-
9 March 2019	Synopsis	49.2	-	-	-	50.8	-	-	-	-	-
9 March 2019	Synopsis	-	-	-	-	49.8	-	-	-	-	50.2
9 March 2019	Synopsis	-	-	-	48.3	51.7	-	-	-	-	-
9 March 2019	Synopsis	-	-	-	-	48.8	-	51.2	-	-	-
9 March 2019	Synopsis	-	-	-	-	41.1	58.9	-	-	-	-
9 March 2019	Synopsis	-	-	-	-	45.9	-	-	-	54.1	-
9 March 2019	Synopsis	40.6	-	-	-	-	-	-	59.3	-	-
9 March 2019	Synopsis	47.1	-	-	-	-	52.9	-	-	-	-
8 March 2019	M&R Asociados / Query Argentina	35.7	-	-	-	35.1	-	-	-	-	-
8 March 2019	M&R Asociados / Query Argentina	35.9	-	-	-	-	36.7	-	-	-	-
8 March 2019	M&R Asociados / Query Argentina	-	-	-	-	34.4	-	-	35.2	-	-
8 March 2019	M&R Asociados / Query Argentina	-	-	-	-	-	32.6	-	32.2	-	-
8 March 2019	Oh! Panel	38	-	-	-	41	-	-	-	-	-
8 March 2019	Oh! Panel	-	-	-	-	30	-	-	37	-	-
8 March 2019	Oh! Panel	31	-	-	-	-	48	-	-	-	-
8 March 2019	Oh! Panel	-	-	-	-	-	36	-	35	-	-
7 March 2019	Universidad de San Andrés	33.1	-	-	-	45.6	-	-	-	-	-
7 March 2019	Universidad de San Andrés	-	-	-	-	30.3	-	-	38	-	-
23 February 2019	Opinaia	43	-	-	-	41	-	-	-	-	-
21 February 2019	Circuitos	42.5	-	-	-	39.9	-	-	-	-	-
17 February 2019	Hugo Haime & Asociados	51	-	-	-	39.1	-	-	-	-	-
17 February 2019	Hugo Haime & Asociados	-	-	-	-	32.3	-	55.5	-	-	-
17 February 2019	Hugo Haime & Asociados	-	-	-	-	33.2	-	-	-	49.6	-
17 February 2019	Hugo Haime & Asociados	-	-	-	-	34.6	50.4	-	-	-	-
12 February 2019	Ricardo Rouvier & Asociados	38.6	-	-	-	38	-	-	-	-	-
10 February 2019	Centro de Estudios de Opinión Pública	40.4	-	-	-	40.3	-	-	-	-	-
10 February 2019	Centro de Estudios de Opinión Pública	-	-	-	-	33.7	-	-	29.7	-	-
4 February 2019	M&R Asociados / Query Argentina	40	-	-	-	38.9	-	-	-	-	-
2 February 2019	Consultora de Imagen y Gestión Política	45	-	-	-	40	-	-	-	-	-
2 February 2019	Consultora de Imagen y Gestión Política	-	-	-	-	31.5		-	36	-	-
2 February 2019	Consultora de Imagen y Gestión Política	-	-	-	-	38	-	-	-	-	35
2 February 2019	Consultora de Imagen y Gestión Política	-	-	-	-	32	-	26	-	-	-
27 January 2019	Ricardo Rouvier & Asociados	38.9	-	-	-	37.9	-	-	-	-	-
23 January 2019	Opinaia	40	-	-	-	43	-	-	-	-	-
23 January 2019	Opinaia	-	-	-	-	36	-	35	-	-	-
23 January 2019	Opinaia	-	-	-	-	34	-	-	37	-	-
23 January 2019	Opinaia	-	34	-	-	41	-	-	-	-	-
21 January 2019	Circuitos	42.7	-	-	-	43.8	-	-	-	-	-
21 January 2019	Circuitos	-	-	-	-	40.6	-	24.3	-	-	-
15 January 2019	Gustavo Córdoba y Asociados	33.4	-	-	-	29.1	-	-	-	-	-
15 January 2019	Gustavo Córdoba y Asociados	-	-	-	-	27.4	-	25.2	-	-	-
15 January 2019	Gustavo Córdoba y Asociados	-	-	-	-	24.4	-	-	-	25.1	-
15 January 2019	Gustavo Córdoba y Asociados	-	-	-	-	25.8	-	-	31	-	-
15 January 2019	Gustavo Córdoba y Asociados	-	-	-	-	29.3	-	-	-	-	20.5
8 January 2019	Quality Politics Argentina	51.7	-	-	-	48.3	-	-	-	-	-
8 January 2019	Quality Politics Argentina	-	-	-	-	46.8	-	-	-	-	53.2
8 January 2019	Quality Politics Argentina	-	47.9	-	-	52.1	-	-	-	-	-
8 January 2019	Quality Politics Argentina	-	-	-	51.7	48.3	-	-	-	-	-
8 January 2019	Quality Politics Argentina	-	-	-	-	51.4	-	48.6	-	-	-
8 January 2019	Quality Politics Argentina	-	-	-	-	44.6	-	-	-	55.5	-
8 January 2019	Dicen	44	-	-	-	41	-	-	-	-	-
8 January 2019	Dicen	-	-	43	-	41	-	-	-	-	-
30 December 2018	Centro de Estudios de la Opinión Pública	32.9	-	-	-	32	-	-	-	-	-
30 December 2018	Centro de Estudios de la Opinión Pública	-	-	-	-	32.6	-	31.6	-	-	-
30 December 2018	Centro de Estudios de la Opinión Pública	-	-	-	-	33.6	-	-	-	-	29.2
30 December 2018	Centro de Estudios de la Opinión Pública	-	-	-	-	31.6	-	-	26.4	-	-
24 December 2018	Isonomía	39	-	-	-	47	-	-	-	-	-
24 December 2018	Isonomía	-	-	-	-	39	-	43	-	-	-
24 December 2018	Isonomía	37	-	-	-	-	55	-	-	-	-
23 December 2018	Gustavo Córdoba y Asociados	41.1	-	-	-	36.6	-	-	-	-	-
23 December 2018	Federico González y Asociados	37.2	-	-	-	40.2	-	-	-	-	-
23 December 2018	Federico González y Asociados	-	-	-	-	38.1	-	39.9	-	-	-
21 December 2018	Consultora de Imagen y Gestión Política	42.19	-	-	-	42.93	-	-	-	-	-
21 December 2018	Consultora de Imagen y Gestión Política	-	-	-	-	42.93	-	-	-	-	34
21 December 2018	Consultora de Imagen y Gestión Política	-	-	-	-	37.22	-	-	38.21	-	-
12 December 2018	Opina Argentina	44	-	-	-	39	-	-	-	-	-
12 December 2018	Opina Argentina	44	-	-	-	-	42	-	-	-	-
9 December 2018	Synopsis	47.1	-	-	-	52.9	-	-	-	-	-
9 December 2018	Synopsis	-	-	-	47.7	52.3	-	-	-	-	-
9 December 2018	Synopsis	-	49.3	-	-	50.7	-	-	-	-	-
9 December 2018	Synopsis	-	-	47.8	-	52.2	-	-	-	-	-
9 December 2018	Synopsis	-	-	-	-	50.5	-	49.5	-	-	-
9 December 2018	Synopsis	-	-	-	-	45.6	-	-	-	54.4	-
9 December 2018	Synopsis	-	-	-	-	48.7	-	-	-	-	51.3
3 December 2018	Ricardo Rouvier & Asociados	38.9	-	-	-	37.9	-	-	-	-	-
2 December 2018	M&R Asociados / Query Argentina	35.9	-	-	-	35.3	-	-	-	-	-
29 November 2018	Gustavo Córdoba y Asociados	43.6	-	-	-	34.2	-	-	-	-	-
29 November 2018	Gustavo Córdoba y Asociados	43.1	-	-	-	-	36.1	-	-	-	-
29 November 2018	Gustavo Córdoba y Asociados	-	-	-	-	28.4	-	29.4	-	-	-
29 November 2018	Gustavo Córdoba y Asociados	-	-	-	-	26.7	-	-	-	21.7	-
24 November 2018	Consultora de Imagen y Gestión Política	34.58	-	-	-	32.08	-	-	-	-	-
21 November 2018	Aresco	39.3	-	-	-	38.8	-	-	-	-	-
12 March 2018	Grupo de Opinión Pública	37.2	-	-	-	44.1	-	-	-	-	-
12 March 2018	Grupo de Opinión Pública	37.3	-	-	-	-	50	-	-	-	-
12 March 2018	Grupo de Opinión Pública	-	-	-	-	37	-	37.4	-	-	-
12 March 2018	Grupo de Opinión Pública	-	-	-	-	-	42.3	37.2	-	-	-
12 March 2018	Grupo de Opinión Pública	-	36.5	-	-	41.5	-	-	-	-	-
12 March 2018	Grupo de Opinión Pública	-	33.1	-	-	-	50.9	-	-	-	-
12 March 2018	Grupo de Opinión Pública	-	-	-	-	37.7	-	-	-	24.7	-
12 March 2018	Grupo de Opinión Pública	-	-	-	-	-	47.2	-	-	22.4	-
12 March 2018	Grupo de Opinión Pública	-	-	-	-	40.1	-	-	-	-	33.7
12 March 2018	Grupo de Opinión Pública	-	-	-	-	-	49.1	-	-	-	29.5
10 March 2018	Synopsis	32.5	-	-	-	49.4	-	-	-	-	-
10 March 2018	Synopsis	-	-	-	-	42.6	-	32.6	-	-	-
10 March 2018	Synopsis	-	-	-	-	38.7	-	-	-	30	-
