= NOS (political party) =

US NOS
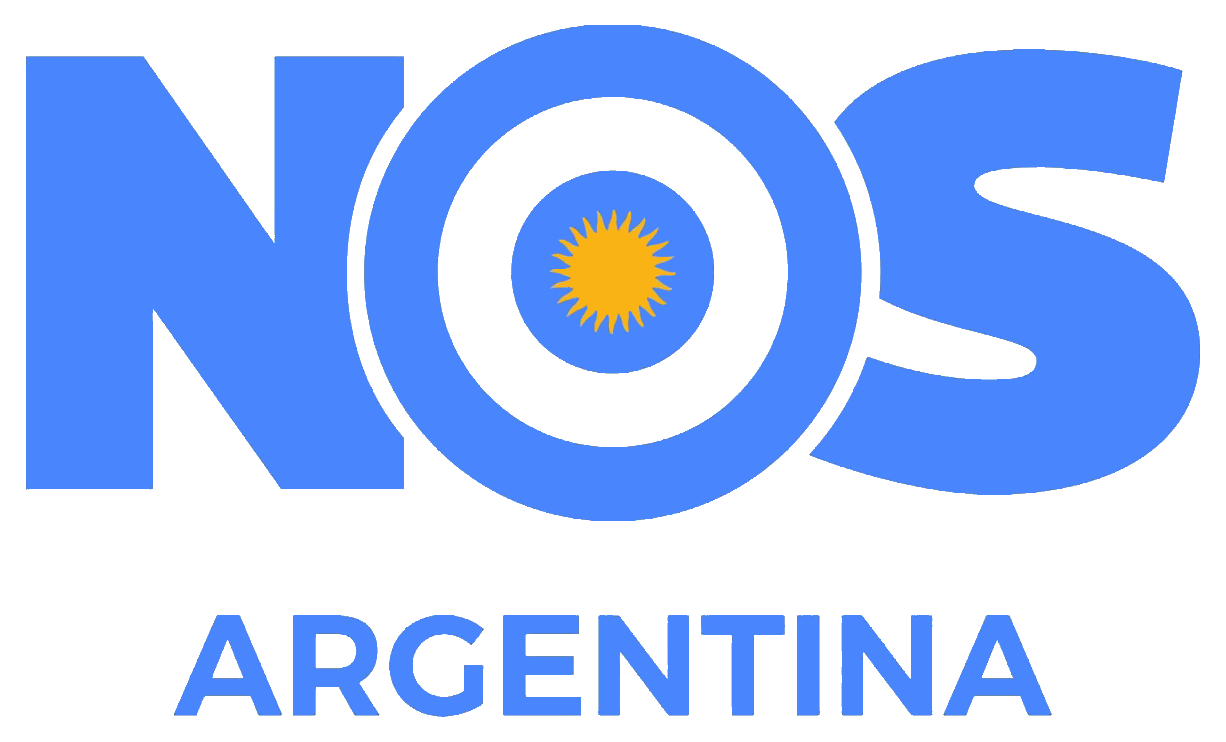
- Leader: Juan José Gómez Centurión
- Founded: 12 June 2019; 7 years ago
- Dissolved: 15 November 2021; 4 years ago
- Succeeded by: +Valores
- Headquarters: Uruguay 880, Buenos Aires
- Youth wing: NOS Jovenes
- Ideology: Ultraconservatism; Liberal conservatism Catholic nationalism Welfare chauvinism Factions: Orthodox Peronism
- Political position: Far-right
- Colours: Blue; White; Gold
- Slogan: «Let's rescue Argentina from failure» (Spanish: «Rescatemos a Argentina del fracaso»)

Website
- afiliatenos.com

The NOS (US) is an Argentine right-wing political coalition registered on 12 June 2019, to compete in the 2019 presidential election. In the 2021 primary elections, it presented candidates in the provinces of Buenos Aires, Córdoba, Corrientes, Santa Cruz, Chaco, Entre Ríos, Mendoza, San Luis, and in CABA.

However, the political proposal of NOS has been developing since the end of 2018, and became official when, in 2019, the then-vice president of the Banco de la Nación Argentina, Major (R) Juan José Gómez Centurión, decided to resign from that position, and completely separate himself from the government of Mauricio Macri.

It is a right-wing space that was born from the social mobilization in 2018 against abortion, and in defense of the traditional family. It criticized the economic performance, taxes and indebtedness, gender identity, the crime rate, corruption, and unemployment during the Macrism and Kirchnerism governments alike.

== History ==
=== 2019 presidential election ===
On 11 March 2019, retired Major and decorated Malvinas War veteran, Juan José Gómez Centurión, publicly broke with the PRO party and its coalition government in Cambiemos by resigning as vice president of the Nation Bank of Argentina. The reasons for the detachment were disagreements with the slow and gradualist change of the economy and social and cultural issues that culminated when Mauricio Macri enabled the debate on the decriminalization of abortion.

The first public appearance of the Centurion and Hotton candidates together took place on 28 March 2019, when the Values for my Country political party was relaunched in the Federación del Box. Numerous anti-abortion leaders from all over the country were present at the event, which until now had only been organized through the Federal Family and Life Front.

During different moments of the campaign they received signs of support from personalities such as journalist Mariano Obarrio; actress and current deputy Amalia Granata; Pablo De La Torre, Secretary of Health and Family Welfare of San Miguel; Pocho Romero Feris, former national senator and ex-governor of Corrientes Province and president of the Autonomist Party, Liliana Negre de Alonso, senator mandate fulfilled by San Luis; Héctor Bonarrico, provincial senator of Mendoza of the Mas Fe party; Pablo Tschirsch, former lieutenant governor of Misiones; pastor Víctor Albarracín, of the Conservative People's Party and shipowner of deputy Alfredo Olmedo; the writers and lecturers Agustín Laje and Nicolás Márquez; el doctor Leandro Rodríguez Lastra; pastor Gabriel Ballerini, bioethicist of ACIERA; Dr. Chinda Brandolino; among other religious references and various NGOs. As the parties of Juan José Gómez Centurión and Cynthia Hotton still did not have enough endorsements, they decided to join parties with legal recognition to present an alliance at the national level.

On 29 June, the most massive act of NOS was held in Rosario; together with the evangelical church, Vision of the Future, about 5,000 women gathered who supported the formula of NOS. On 15 September in Córdoba, within the framework of the G12 Convention, candidate Cynthia Hotton spoke to about 23,000 people.

On Wednesday, 7 August, the Las PASO 2019 campaign was closed at the Asturian Center in Vicente López.

On 8 August 2019, the date on which the International Day of Action for Two Lives is celebrated, according to its organizers, for the anniversary of the rejection of abortion in Congress, an event was held at the Metropolitan Theater with the presence of about a thousand evangelical pastors.

On 11 August, in the 2019 presidential and legislative primary elections, the Frente NOS prevailed as the fifth national force with more than half a million votes, between 650 thousand and 820 thousand according to the ballot cut. In the provinces of Misiones and Chaco, it positioned itself as the third electoral force with about 5% of the votes, in the remaining provinces – with the exception of the Province of Buenos Aires, Catamarca, Neuquén and the Autonomous city of Buenos Aires (CABA) — it was the fourth force. In the Argentine bases of Antarctica and in the village of Suncho Corral it took second place.

On 10 November, after the 2019 presidential and legislative elections and Cynthia Hotton's estrangement to dedicate herself to her own party, a national meeting of regional referents close to Juan José Gómez Centurión was held at the Estancia San Agustín in Santa Rita, Mendoza, where the founding act of the NOS party, successor of the electoral front, was signed with a view to competing in a greater center-right alliance in the legislative elections of 2021. To date, the NOS Party has presented itself with its respective promoting boards in 20 out of 24 districts.

=== 2021 legislative elections ===
In the framework of the 2021 legislative elections of Argentina, NOS presents candidates for national deputies in the provinces of Buenos Aires (Juan José Gómez Centurión on the Union for the Future front), Santa Cruz (Pedro Márquez on the "NOS Santa Cruz" list), Chaco Province (Darío Cañete together with Acción Chaqueña on the "NOS + Acción Chaqueña" list), Entre Ríos Province (Miriam Müller together with the Conservative People's Party on the "EntrerriaNOS" list), Province of Córdoba (Jorge Scala on the "Libertarios + NOS" list) and in the City of Buenos Aires (María Fernanda Araujo for the frente La Libertad Avanza).

NOS has María Marta Silva Ortiz as the second pre-candidate for national senator for the Province of Corrientes ("Libertad + Valores + Nosotros somos el cambio" list) and Ana Nemer as the second pre-candidate for national senator for the Province of Córdoba on the "Libertarios + NOS" list. He also presents candidates to local legislators in the provinces of Buenos Aires (together with the Union for All party), Chaco, Mendoza (together with the Pensioners Party), Misiones (together with the Democratic Party) and in San Luis with its own party. He also supports the national and local candidates of the Christian Democratic Party in Neuquén and the Fuerza Republicana in Tucumán.

== Ideology ==
It describes itself as a pre-ideological party, that is, it does not possess an ideology according to the Marxist meaning. According to its founder, Gómez Centurión, the social and economic problems of Argentina have a deeper cultural background caused by the loss of the moral order of both the ruling class and Argentine society.

NOS proposes to recover the Christian moral values with which Argentina was founded, such as justice, respect, honesty, solidarity, etc. through a moral and historical pact. Based on this ideology, a philosophy of the role of the State is formed as a guarantor of the historical continuity of the nation project and protector of the rights to life, liberty and private property that allow the development of the community.

=== Historical model ===
The pragmatism of NOS allows a historical conciliation and a complementarity between the local liberal-conservative and Catholic nationalist doctrines with a conservative articulating axis with the political purpose of disputing the power of social democracy and cultural progressivism, their antagonistic models. It takes elements of the administrative and institutional model of the time of the conservative republic of the PAN, and the Constitution of 1853 product of intellectuals and politicians of the Generation of '80 and '37 as Sarmiento and Alberdi and statesmen like Julio Argentino Roca.

On the other hand, great importance is given to the Argentine Catholic and Hispanic tradition and to the conception of the State according to the social doctrine of the church, the natural order and the principle of Subsidiarity. His inspiration comes from Argentine intellectuals such as Sacheri, Meinvielle, Jordán Genta and Castellani.

Gómez Centurión has sympathized with the state model in different aspects of the Argentine governments of Agustín Justo of nationalist conservatism, Julio Argentino Roca of liberalism and Juan Manuel de Rosas of Catholic nationalism.

=== Internal currents ===
Within NOS converge both conservative sectors (Social, fiscal and national) and nationalists (Spanish-Catholic traditionalists, monarchists, and Catholic nationalists as liberals (Classicals, conservatives and paleolibertarians) and Christian democrats. Although NOS is a non-denominational party, it is made up of a large number of Catholics and evangelicals. NOS is the broadest right-wing force in the country.

There are general coincidences with national conservative parties such as VOX in Spain, Donald Trump's Republican sector in the United States, Bolsonaro's Alliance for Brazil, among many other European and American parties. The main differences with US stand out in the framework of immigration and national identity, the degree of trade protectionism, and economic liberalism.

=== Relationship with Peronism ===
The NOS party, unlike other right-wing spaces, does not call itself anti-Peronist; instead, it claims certain elements of Juan Perón's first presidency, such as the demographic, industrial and geopolitical model, the class alliance, social mobility and the organized community in contrast to Kirchnerist progressivism. In this sense there are many coincidences between the Catholic nationalists and the Orthodox justicialists who ascribe to NOS. However, NOS is also critical of both Peronist praxis: and doctrine in terms of interventionism, welfare state, personalism, statism, etc.

=== Relationship with liberalism ===
The socio-economic doctrine of NOS is a local version of the social market economy, a pragmatic capitalism influenced by the Social Doctrine of the Church and partly also by economic liberalism. Therefore, there are general coincidences with classical liberalism and minarchism especially on issues of the role and size of the state, non-intervention in the price system, the defense of Private property and the need for labor, tax and administrative reforms. It differs with liberalism in terms of protectionism where NOS has a hostile stance towards commercial globalism and moderately more favorable to the promotion of the industrial matrix.

== Proposes ==
Its main axes are the defense of life, freedom and property together with the common good, the family, tradition and the homeland. Among the proposals and campaign harangues, the firm opposition to abortion and the support for the traditional family in opposition to progressivism and radical feminism stand out.

In the economic aspect, he is advised by the economist Agustín Monteverde and proposes the refounding of the State through a new social pact that contemplates labor, tax, pension reforms, etc., the independence of the Central Bank to limit monetary issuance and inflation, the drastic reduction and simplification of taxes (low flat tax) around 50%, the reduction of the number of state employees, exchange freedom, deregulation and moderate trade protectionism. The aim is the genuine creation of private employment, the reactivation of the national industry and exports together with economic stability and legal security.

In the social aspect, the discourse aims to use public spending almost exclusively for health, educational and public security improvements. A limited and efficient State with a strategic geopolitical vision dedicated to the protection of the most vulnerable sectors, against drug trafficking and promoter of public order.

Their proposals, in terms of justice and security aim to frame the public order and citizen, with greater discipline penalty, life sentence for rapists and murderers through reforms to the Criminal Code and reinforcement of public safety with the support of the armed forces, voluntary military service, repression of pickets, easing into the carrying of weapons, and a greater margin of the concept of self-defense.

Its leader, Gómez Centurión is a veteran of the Falklands War (retired with the rank of Major and the specialty of command) holds the highest decoration given by the country. He was part of the carapintadas group, rising up against his military and political superiors who were part of the government of Raúl Alfonsín. In accordance with his nationalist discourse of the National Reorganization Process, his support for the armed forces and his military life, he affirmed in a television program not without questions and denunciations that the last military dictatorship did not have a genocidal plan but was an internal war between the army and Marxist terrorist insurgents (Montoneros and ERP).

== Controversies ==
The relationship between Gómez Centurión and Cynthia Hotton had been weaving for some time, when Hotton reappeared publicly on social networks announcing that he would return from his diplomatic work in the OAS and when Gómez Centurión's proposal began to be disseminated. For some sectors considered ultranationalist and neo-Nazis, it constituted a strategy of the Mauricio Macri government to attract voters disenchanted with its management, since the Frente NOS ended up absorbing all the other attempts to form anti-abortion groups and included few recognized abortion opponents on its lists, these statements were forcefully dismissed by the candidates.

Due to the fact that Gómez Centurión did not have his own political party and that Cynthia Hotton's party still did not reach enough endorsements, both decided to join parties with legal recognition to present an alliance at the national level. However, the use of stamps of other related parties harmed them since in a measure of dubious proceeding, the representative of the Conservative People's Party, Marco Aurelio Michelli, prevented NOS from presenting candidacies for National Deputies in the Province of Buenos Aires, the most important district in electoral terms.

On 17 May 2021, a group of militants from the party's youth vandalized the LGBT flag that was hanging in front of the Obelisco de Buenos Aires, a fact that was filmed by the same participants and later shared on social networks accompanied by the legend «Let's cut with the lobbies, let's cut with taxes. Return the Homeland!" This act was also shared by Juan José Gómez Centurión on his personal Twitter account. This event was repudiated by the Argentine LGBT Federation and by the Undersecretary of Human Rights of the City of Buenos Aires, who described the act as hateful towards the LGBT community.
