= Avanza Libertad =

Argentine political coalition

Freedom Advances Avanza Libertad
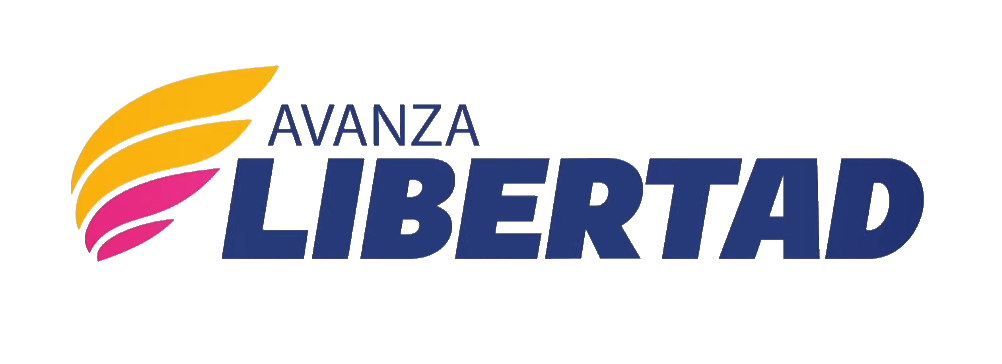
- Abbreviation: AL
- Leader: José Luis Espert
- Founded: 12 June 2019 (Frente Despertar); 7 December 2020 (Avanza Libertad)
- Dissolved: 12 March 2024
- Merged into: La Libertad Avanza
- Ideology: Classical liberalism; Libertarian conservatism; Economic liberalism Libertarianism
- Political position: Right-wing to far-right
- Coalition members: Union of the Democratic Centre; Libertarian Party; Democratic Party; Autonomist Party; United Republicans
- Colours: Blue; Black
- Members: Union of the Democratic Centre; Unite por la Libertad y la Dignidad; Democratic Party; Autonomist Party; Libertarian Party
- Politics of Argentina; Political parties; Elections; A: It included centre-right and far-right factions.

Avanza Libertad (English: Freedom Advances; AL), originally founded in 2019 as Frente Despertar (English: Awakening Front; FD), was an Argentine right-wing political coalition. Renamed in 2020, Avanza Libertad had legal status in the Buenos Aires Province. Ideologically, it is libertarian conservative, supportive of economic liberalism, and critical of both Kirchnerism and Juntos por el Cambio. Led by José Luis Espert, it included centre-right and far-right factions, with its more radical factions being compared to Spain's Vox.

The coalition members included the Union of the Democratic Centre, the Democratic Party of the City of Buenos Aires, the Autonomist Party, and the United Republicans. Espert ran in the legislative elections with his own alliance of centre-right and right-wing parties. The presentation was made after the negotiations with the leaders of Juntos por el Cambio failed. Previously, the alliance in the Autonomous City of Buenos Aires also included Javier Milei, who later confirmed that he would compete separately from Espert.

Its presidential candidate was the economist José Luis Espert, who announced on 23 December 2018 his intention to participate in the presidential elections.

== History ==
=== Frente Despertar ===
Frente Despertar logo

On 11 June 2019, the coalition Frente Despertar was made official before the courts, which led to José Luis Espert, as candidate for president, and Luis Rosales, as candidate for vice president, in the 2019 Argentine general election. Espert had declared his intention to participate in the presidential race on 23 December 2018. This national alliance was made up of the Unite for Freedom and Dignity party, the Union of the Democratic Centre (UCEDE) except in the City of Buenos Aires, and some sectors of the Libertarian Party. In the beginning, the alliance had the support of Alberto Asseff, president of the UNIR Constitutional Nationalist Party; after a sudden change, he decided to leave the front and support Juntos por el Cambio. This fact caused that the ex alliance was almost terminated by Assef's sudden change; due to the signing of the UNITE seal, he was able to participate in the elections a few days later.

Espert launched his electoral campaign at the Héctor Etchart stadium of the Ferro Carril Oeste club, in the Buenos Aires neighborhood of Caballito, where he was accompanied by his main candidates. There he asked to vote "neither with fear nor anger" and abandon "the crack speech".

The alliance was about to be disbanded because Alberto Asseff's party, UNIR Constitutional Nationalist Party (the only party in the alliance that met the requirements to nominate a presidential candidate), stopped supporting the front. But a few days later, UNITE backed Espert's candidacy and ended up participating in the elections.

In the primary elections, the electoral coalition obtained 2.16% of the votes, a total of 550,593 votes. Having exceeded 1.5% of the required votes, they were able to stand in the general elections. In the October elections they obtained a total of 394,206 votes, 1.47% of the votes; being, in this way, last in front of five other candidates.

Following doubts related to the financing of the 2019 Argentine presidential election campaign of the Frente Despertar and the links with the drug trafficking detainee Federico "Fred" Machado, Milei was denounced along with José Luis Espert; Milei did not take part to the 2019 campaign. Luis Rosales, Jimena Aristizabal, and Nazareno Etchepare also entered the complaint before the Federal Criminal and Correctional Court No. 8, for the crimes of concealment and illicit association.

=== Avanza Libertad ===
In September 2020, during a live broadcast with Espert, the economist Javier Milei confirmed that he would be a candidate for deputy for the City of Buenos Aires, on behalf of the Frente Despertar. On 23 October 2020, the lawyer, Francisco Oneto also made the decision to support the space by adhering to its electoral proposals.

On 10 March 2021, a meeting was held between the main referents of the Autonomist Party, the Democratic Party, the UCEDE, United Republicans, the Republican Liberal Party, and Valores para mi País for the formation of an electoral coalition called as Frente Vamos, whose objective was to compete in the 2021 Argentine legislative election. Soon after, José Antonio Romero Feris, president of the Autonomist Party, announced that he would not participate in any electoral alliance that "divides the opposition political arc".

In June 2021, Espert proposed a broad opposition front against the government of Axel Kicillof in the province of Buenos Aires for the 2021 legislative election, and that it would include anti-Kirchnerist sectors like Juntos por el Cambio.

==== 2021 legislative election ====
On 14 July 2021, the closing day for the presentation of alliances for the legislative elections of 2021, the Avanza Libertad coalition was made official with parties from the Argentine political centre-right sector in the province of Buenos Aires. The UCEDE, the Democratic Party, and the Autonomist Party took part in the coalition, in addition to political groups in the province, such as United Republicans and the Republican Libertarian Movement.

== Electoral platform ==
The electoral platform of Avanza Libertad has fourteen proposals. They were announced in conjunction with Espert's candidacy and published on the coalition's website, where they were developed more broadly.

1. Eliminate or reduce to a very low and uniform minimum import tariffs.
2. Sign free trade agreements with all regions or countries that wish to access the local market.
3. Eliminate export taxes (retentions).
4. Reduce public spending.
5. Focus attention on the most vulnerable sectors.
6. Transform social plans into in-kind disbursements (community kitchens, health and education plans, etc.).
7. Lower the tax burden, including the elimination of certain taxes and the reduction of others.
8. Keep fiscal accounts balanced.
9. Reduce the expenses of the political apparatus.
10. End the partnership and propose a political regionalization of the provinces in order to obtain jurisdictions that are self-financing.
11. Eliminate all industrial and regional promotion regimes.
12. Reforms within syndicalism and collective bargaining agreements.
13. Reform the educational system.
14. Reform the Penal Code and Criminal Procedure of the Nation, imposing sentences of effective compliance and eliminating constitutional guarantees that favor criminals.

== Controversies ==
Various journalistic media and referents of Argentine economic liberalism criticized the alleged financing by Kirchnerism of the 2019 Argentine general election campaign of the Despertar Front for which its campaign manager, the former member of the Civic Coalition ARI, Nazareno Etchepare, would have resigned. Luis Rosales forcefully denied all the accusations. In turn, an alleged collaboration by Kirchnerism in the control of the ballots during the elections came to light and so that the front could print its ballots in the province of Buenos Aires glued to its local candidates.

In August 2020, the journalist Eduardo Feinmann revived these accusations on his television program and social networks, stating that Espert's candidacy was promoted by the former president and political shipowner Eduardo Duhalde, that it was financed by Eduardo de Pedro and mayors of the suburbs and later by the head of government Horacio Rodríguez Larreta. This last statement was confirmed by the former first candidate for Buenos Aires legislator linked to the convicted former minister Julio de Vido, Gonzalo Díaz Córdoba, who was appointed in 2020 by the Buenos Aires government as trustee of the Puerto Madero Corporation. The economist Diego Giacomini, who accompanied Espert during the first part of his 2019 campaign, and the musician Emmanuel Danann, also confirmed the previous accusations, indicating that Espert would have been promoted by Eduardo Duhalde and Carlos Menem to subtract votes from Mauricio Macri's camp and allow the Frente de Todos to reach the ballot.

The Despertar Front was also accused of having rented the parties presided over by Alberto Assef (UNIR) and José Bonacci (UNITE) in exchange for money. Although the financing reports of the Frente Despertar campaign did not declare private contributions, it is suspected that the campaign was financed by Federico "Fred" Machado, a businessman arrested for crimes of illicit association for the manufacture and distribution of cocaine, money laundering, and fraud. It was also argued that the campaign received contributions from the governor of the province of Formosa, Gildo Insfrán, and the late banker Jorge Horacio Brito, thanks to the link between Sergio Massa and Daniel Ivoskus. Finally, it was said that Daniel Vila, president of Grupo América, supported Espert's candidacy. As a result of the doubts related to the financing of the presidential campaign of the ex-Frente Despertar in 2019 and the ties with Machado, Espert was denounced along with Rosales, Milei, Jimena Aristizabal, and Nazareno Etchepare, before the Federal Criminal and Correctional Court No. 8, for the crimes of concealment and illicit association.

== Member parties ==
Party	President	Ideology	Position
Union of the Democratic Centre	Hugo Bontempo	Classical liberalism	Right-wing
Democratic Party of the City of Buenos Aires (left in 2022)	Carlos Nestor Onteiro (interventor)	Conservative liberalism	Centre-right
Libertarian Party (left in 2021)	Lucas Gazzotti	Libertarian conservatism	Right-wing
Autonomist Party	José Romero Feris	Autonomism	Centre-right
United Republicans	Sebastián "Vasco" Pascual	Liberalism	Right-wing
Republican Libertarian Movement	Luciano Silva	Liberalism	Centre-right
Popular Dignity	Ernesto Raúl Habra	Neo-Nazism	Far-right
Alternative Plural Encounter	Andrés Resa	Federal Peronism	Right-wing

== Electoral results ==
=== Presidential elections ===
Year	Ticket		Primary		First round		Result	Notes
Year	President	Vice President	Votes	%	Votes	%	Position	Notes
2019	José Luis Espert	Luis Rosales	550.593		394,206		6th	

=== National Congress elections ===
==== Chamber of Deputies ====
Year	Votes	%	Seats won	Total seats
2019	113,812	0.44%	0 / 130	0 / 257

==== Senate ====
Year	Votes	%	Seats won	Total seats
2019	38,970	0.69%	0 / 24	0 / 72

=== National Deputies for the Province of Buenos Aires ===
Year	Primary		General		Seats		Position
Year	Votes	%	Votes	%	Obtained	Total	Position
2021	417.858		656.487		2 / 35	2 / 70	3º

=== Deputies of the Province of Buenos Aires ===
Year	Votes	%	Seats		Position
Year	Votes	%	Obtained	Total	Position
2021	288.536		3 / 46	3 / 92	3rd

=== Senate of the Province of Buenos Aires ===
Year	Votes	%	Seats		Position
Year	Votes	%	Obtained	Total	Position
2021	334.228		0 / 23	0 / 46	3rd

== See also ==
- Anarcho-capitalism
- Right-libertarianism
