= +Valores =

Argentine political party

+Values +Valores
- Leader: Cynthia Hotton
- Legalised: 2021
- Dissolved: 2022
- Preceded by: NOS Front
- Youth wing: Youngs with Values
- Ideology: Catholic social teaching Evangelicalism; Christian right Conservatism; Social Justice; Social Market Economy; Conservative Liberalism; Pro-life
- Political position: Right-wing
- Religion: Evangelism

Website
- https://www.valoresparamipais.com/

+Values or More Values is a political alliance Argentina of conservative cut, created to compete in the legislative elections of 2021. It is led by evangelist Cynthia Hotton.

The alliance was in force in the provinces of, Buenos Aires, Córdoba, Chaco and Mendoza.

== History ==
The +Values alliance was created by former congresswoman Cynthia Hotton proclaiming the union of the parties Valores para mi País, Light Blue and White Union, and the Anti-Corruption Party. The leader sought to represent the horizon of the evangelists to bring that representativeness to congress and to each municipality, competing for the legislative elections of 2021, surpassing the floor to qualify for the generals. She placed herself behind the front Vamos con Vos of Randazzo, obtaining more than one hundred thousand votes, but without getting any bench.

== Proposals ==
These are the main postulates and axes of their proposals:

- 1. Call for unity, dialogue, social agreement and the formulation of basic agreements.
- 2. Strong institutions, political stability and deepening of democracy.
- 3. A comprehensive development project.
- 4. A market economy with a state that promotes growth and social justice.
- 5. Equal opportunities. Quality education for a job with dignity.
- 6. To govern is to generate prosperity and create jobs.
- 7. Federalism and redesign of the Argentine economic geography.
- 8. Transparency and decency as the fundamental axis of the development model.
- 9. Defend sovereignty and ensure inner peace.
- 10. A nation with a presence in the world.

== Ideology ==
The Alliance is primarily evangelical, recognized as an advocate of Christian social doctrine, and an advocate of the social market economy and social justice; in contrast to the liberal sectors. It considers itself a non-liberal centre-right and pro-life alliance, the latter being one of the most outstanding things of his ideals. Although various media consider them to be on the right or even ultra-right.

Some media consider them conservative, although their main reference denies being so.

== Members ==
Party	Leader	Ideology	Position
Valores para mi País	Cynthia Hotton	Ultraconservatism	Centre-right to far-right
Anticorruption Party	Leonardo Mollard	Anti-corruption	Centre-right
Light Blue and White Union	Carlos Fabián Luayza Troncoso	Conservative liberalism	Centre-right to right-wing

== External support ==
When classifying for the final legislative elections, other groups and parties that did not make it decided to support +Valores, among them are:

Party	Leader	Ideology	Position
Popular Party	Santiago Cúneo	Ultraconservatism; Antisemitism	Far-right
Pro-life Light Blue Party	Raúl Guillermo Magnasco	Provida; Conservatism	Right-wing to far-right
Conservative People's Party	Marco Aurelio Michelli	Peronismo	Right-wing
New Citizen Union	Juan Carlos Neves	National conservatism	Right-wing to far-right
Union for All	Jorge Simmermacher	Republican liberalism	Right-wing to far-right
Federal Party	Daniel Madeo	Federalism	Centre-right
Frente Evangélico Justicialista	Unknown	Peronismo	Centre-right
