= Libertarian Party (Argentina) =

Political party in Argentina

Libertarian Party Partido Libertario
- Abbreviation: PL
- President: Nicolás Emma
- Honorary president: Javier Milei
- Founded: 16 October 2018
- Registered: 15 October 2023 (national level)
- Split from: Liberal Libertarian Party
- Youth wing: Jóvenes Libertarios
- Membership (2023): ▲21,841
- Ideology: Libertarian conservatism; Paleolibertarianism; Economic liberalism; Minarchism; Factions: Anarcho-capitalism
- Political position: Right-wing to far-right
- National affiliation: La Libertad Avanza (2021–present)
- Regional affiliation: Alianza Libertaria de Iberoamérica
- Colours: Violet
- Chamber of Deputies: 0 / 257
- Senate: 1 / 72

The Libertarian Party (Spanish: Partido Libertario, abbr. PL) is a political party in Argentina. It promotes libertarian conservatism. In 2019, Javier Milei affiliated to the party; the same year, it joined the Avanza Libertad coalition. In 2021, it was one of the founding parties of the La Libertad Avanza coalition, led by Javier Milei. Milei was chosen honorary president in May 2022. He won the 2023 Argentine general election runoff, placed second in the first round of the general election, and placed first in the Argentine primary election with 29.86% of the vote.

The party's ideology, according to its platform, centers on libertarianism, advocating for free markets and a minimal and secular state, among other ideas. However, among its followers, there are positions ranging from classical liberalism and conservatism to anarcho-capitalism and cross-sectional approaches.

The party has obtained authorisation to support national-level candidacies. The establishment of the National Executive Board took place in Rosario, with the participation of libertarian leaders from various provinces. The party holds national legal recognition and is established in 11 districts, including the Federal Capital. It is currently chaired by Nicolás Emma.

== History ==
The party was founded in 2018 by a majority of young individuals from various regions of the country. They were connected and grouped through social networks and debate forums, all sympathizers of the media-savvy economist Javier Milei. On February 23 of the following year, during a party event in the Federal Capital organized by the Libertarian Party, Milei publicly affiliated with the party.

In 2019, it joined the Avanza Libertad coalition, led by José Luis Espert. They left in 2021, becoming one of the founding members of the La Libertad Avanza coalition, led by Milei, which would ended up winning the 2023 Argentine general election. Milei was chosen as honorary president on 23 May 2022.

It was the only party which Javier Milei was affiliated to until September 2024, when the La Libertad Avanza party was inaugurated at a national level.

== Election results ==
=== Presidential elections ===
Year	Candidates	Popular votes	Percentage	Alliance	Image
2019	Supported; José Luis Espert (Ind.)	394,207	1.47% (lost)	Frente Despertar	
2023	Javier Milei	14,554,560 (Runoff)	55.65% (won)	La Libertad Avanza	

=== Legislative elections ===
Year	Popular votes	Percentage	Deputies	Senators	Alliance
2019	6,440	0.31%	0	0	Frente Despertar
2021	358,377	1.54%	1 (+1)	0	La Libertad Avanza
2023	6,788,400	27.90%	4 (+3)	1 (+1)	La Libertad Avanza
