= Rodolfo Suárez =

Argentine politician

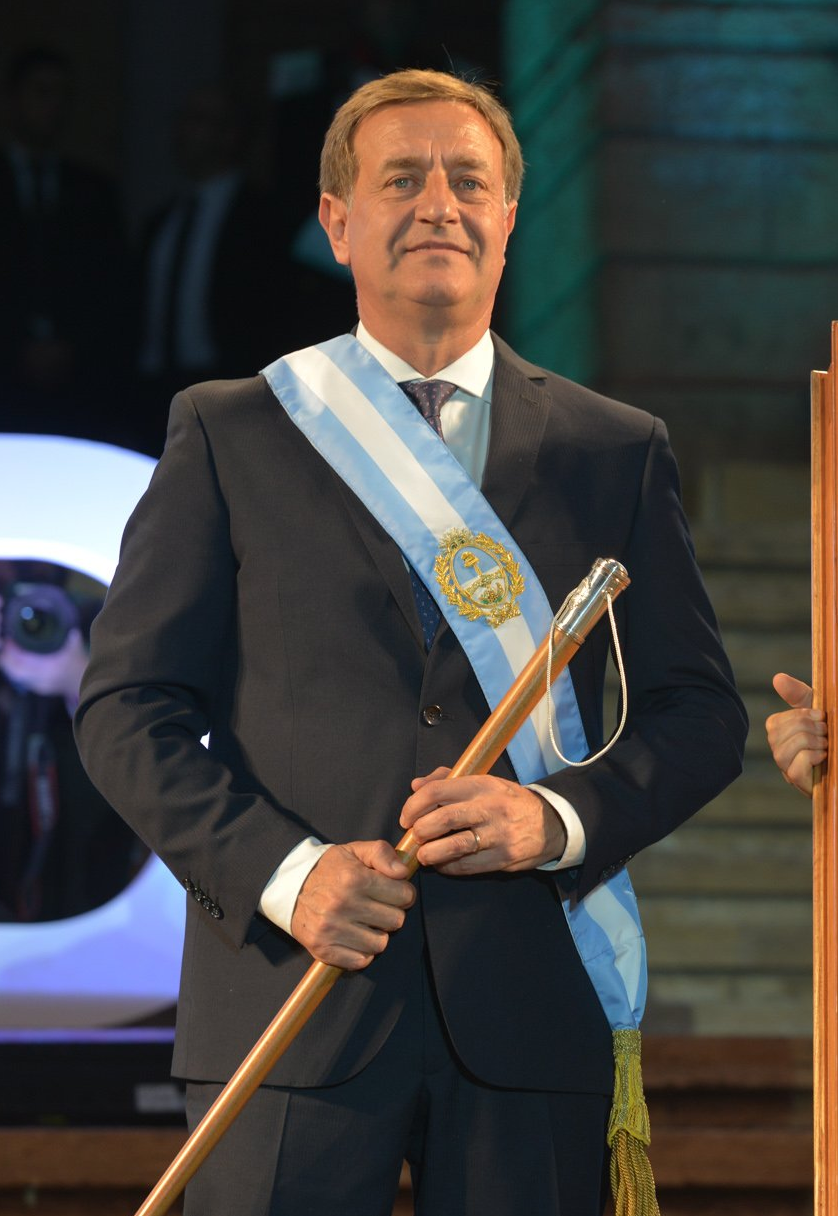
- Suárez in 2019

National Senator
- Incumbent
- Assumed office 10 December 2023
- Constituency: Mendoza

Governor of Mendoza
- In office 10 December 2019 – 10 December 2023
- Vice Governor: Mario Abed
- Preceded by: Alfredo Cornejo
- Succeeded by: Alfredo Cornejo

Mayor of Mendoza
- In office 7 August 2014 – 10 December 2019
- Preceded by: Víctor Fayad
- Succeeded by: Ulpiano Suárez

Personal details
- Born: Rodolfo Alejandro Suarez; 20 April 1963 (age 63) La Consulta, Mendoza Province, Argentina
- Party: Radical Civic Union
- Other political affiliations: Juntos por el Cambio (2015–present)
- Education: National University of Córdoba

Rodolfo Alejandro Suarez (born 20 April 1963) is an Argentine Radical Civic Union politician who is currently serving as a National Senator for Mendoza Province since 10 December 2023. He previously served as governor of Mendoza from 2019 to 2023, and from 2014 to 2019, he was intendente (mayor) of the City of Mendoza, having assumed office following the death of then-mayor Víctor Fayad.

Suarez wanted to reform the Constitution, which has not been updated for more than 100 years. He proposed to update rights, establish unicamerality, increase territorial representation, reduce political spending and leave out the possibility of reelection of the governor. The Justicialist Party opposed it.

== Early life and education ==
Rodolfo Alejandro Suarez was born on 20 April 1963 in the rural town of La Consulta, in the San Carlos Department of Mendoza Province, the youngest of four siblings. Suárez comes from a political family: both of his grandfathers served as mayors of San Carlos; Ricardo Reynoso for the Justicialist Party (PJ) and Ulpiano Suárez for the Radical Civic Union (UCR). Rodolfo's father, Ulpiano, served as president of the provincial Chamber of Deputies. His nephew, also named Ulpiano after his father and grandfather, succeeded him as mayor of Mendoza in 2019.

Suárez moved to Mendoza in 1981 to study law at the University of Mendoza, later finishing his studies at the National University of Córdoba, where he earned his licenciatura in 1991.

== Political career ==
Suárez joined the Radical Civic Union in the 1980s. He held a number of low-profile advisoral positions in the provincial legislature and the City of Mendoza throughout the 1990s before being elected to the Mendoza City Council in 2009.

Throughout his career he maintained a close friendship with Víctor Fayad, who was twice mayor of Mendoza; Suárez has stated that he considered Fayad to be his "mentor" and "political godfather"; it was Fayad who suggested Suárez run for a seat in the City Council. He was sworn in on 21 April 2010. A year later, Suárez was elected president of the city council.

Upon Fayad's death due to cancer on 7 August 2014, Suárez succeeded him as mayor of Mendoza. He ran for the position the next year and won with 59.99% of the vote.

=== Governor of Mendoza ===
Ahead of the 2019 general election, Suárez was nominated by the ruling UCR to be the Cambiemos Mendoza gubernatorial candidate. He won the election with 51% against Frente de Todos candidate Anabel Fernández Sagasti's 36%. He took office on 10 December 2019.

On 20 December 2019 the provincial legislature passed – with Suárez's blessing – a resolution modifying Law 7722 on mining regulations; the new modified law allowed for the use of cyanide and sulfuric acid in surface mining, which could have had negative impact on the province's already limited water resources. The initiative stirred controversy and was widely protested by locals and environmentalist groups. The law was overturned on 30 December 2019. On 26 February 2026, Suárez, as a national senator, voted in favor of a bill that received Senate approval to amend the Ley de Glaciares (Glaciers Law), changing protections for periglacial environments from an absolute ban to a framework that allows provinces to decide.

== Personal life ==
Suárez is married to Fabiana Calleja, a physics education teacher. He has four children: Gastón, Valentín, Sofía and Facundo.

Political offices
Preceded by Víctor Fayad	Mayor of Mendoza; 2014–2019	Succeeded by Ulpiano Suárez
Preceded by Alfredo Cornejo	Governor of Mendoza; 2019–2023	Succeeded by Alfredo Cornejo
