= Anabel Fernández Sagasti =

Argentine politician (born 1984)

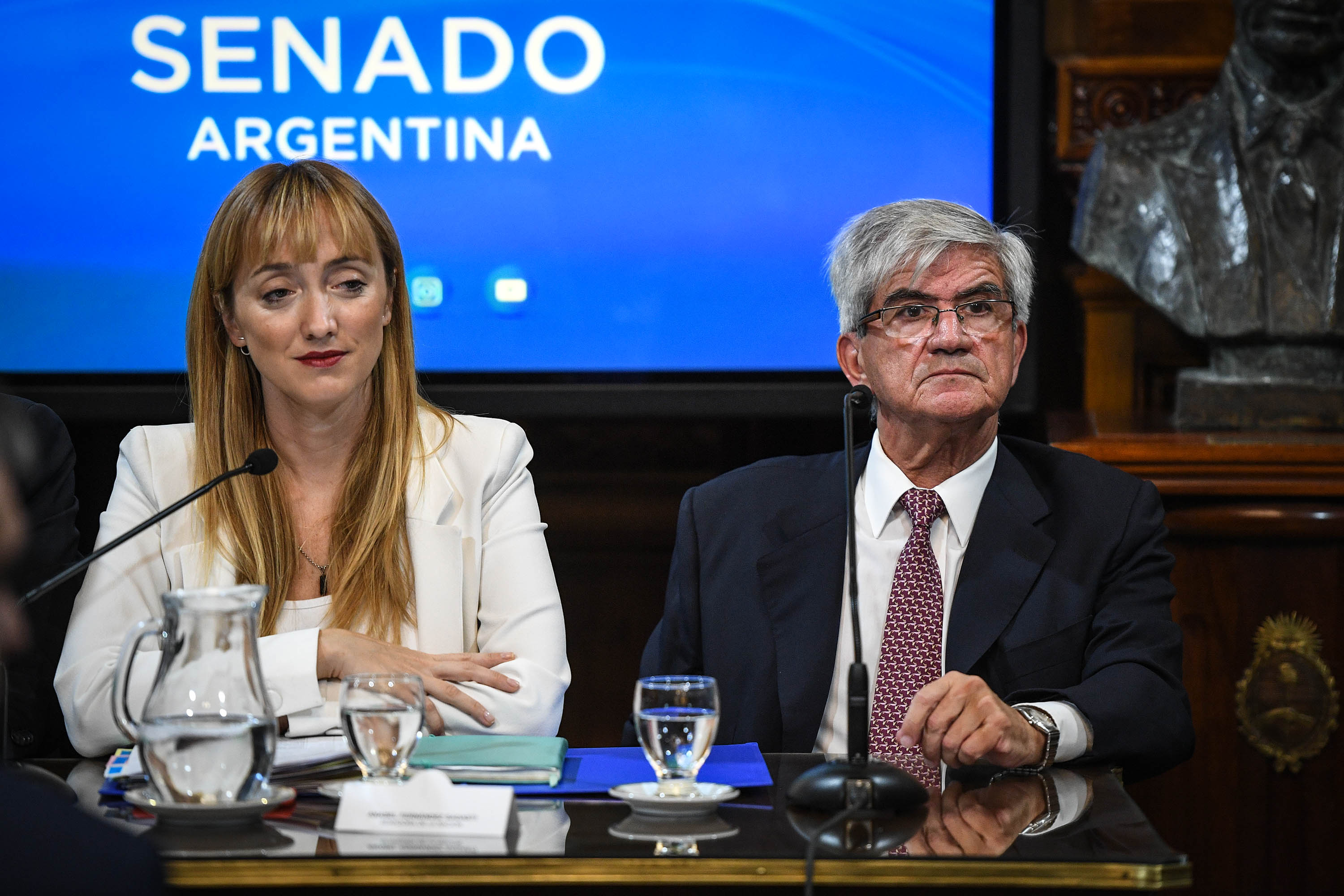

National Senator
- Incumbent
- Assumed office 10 December 2015
- Constituency: Mendoza

Councillor of Magistracy
- In office 10 March 2015 – 10 December 2015
- Appointed by: Chamber of Deputies

National Deputy
- In office 10 December 2011 – 10 December 2015
- Constituency: Mendoza

Personal details
- Born: 3 April 1984 (age 42) Godoy Cruz, Mendoza Province, Argentina
- Party: Justicialist Party
- Other political affiliations: Front for Victory (2011–2017); Citizen's Unity (2017–2019); Frente de Todos (since 2019)
- Education: National University of Cuyo

Anabel Fernández Sagasti (born 3 April 1984) is an Argentine politician, currently serving as a National Senator for Mendoza Province since 2015. She previously served as a National Deputy from 2011 to 2015, elected in Mendoza as well. Fernández Sagasti has been the president of the Mendoza chapter of the Justicialist Party since 2020.

== Early life and education ==
Anabel Fernández Sagasti was born on 3 April 1984 in Godoy Cruz, Mendoza Province. Her father, Roberto Fernández, was a peronist trade union leader. She studied law at the National University of Cuyo and graduated in 2011, and also has an auctioneer title authorized by the Supreme Court of Mendoza.

== Political career ==
Fernández Sagasti's political activism began in La Cámpora; she was one of the group's founding members in Mendoza. At the 2011 legislative elections, Fernández Sagasti was the second candidate in the Front for Victory (FPV) list to the Argentine Chamber of Deputies in Mendoza, and was comfortably elected as the list received 46.76% of the vote; elected at 27, she became one of the youngest legislators in the lower chamber of Congress at the time. As a national deputy, Fernández Sagasti introduced legislation to extend maternity leave in cases of preterm birth. From 10 March to 10 December 2015, she was one of the Chamber of Deputies' representatives in the Council of Magistracy.

Fernández Sagasti was the first FPV candidate to the National Senate in Mendoza for the 2015 legislative election. Although the FPV list was not the most voted in the province, Fernández Sagasti was still elected in the minority seat and was sworn in as National Senator on 10 December 2015.

As senator, Fernández Sagasti voted in favour of the Voluntary Interruption of Pregnancy bill, which would have legalised abortion in Argentina, but was struck down by her fellow senators on 8 August 2018. Fernández Sagasti explained her position stating that "maternity cannot be the one, mandatory destiny [for women]".

=== Gubernatorial run ===
Fernández Sagasti ran for governor of Mendoza Province in 2019. She won the 9 June primaries within the Justicialist Front with 17.40% of the vote against Alejandro Bermejo; Fernández Sagasti represented the more kirchnerist wing of the Justicialist Party, while Bermejo was the more "traditional" peronist candidate. She faced off UCR candidate and City of Mendoza mayor Rodolfo Suárez on 29 September 2019, but lost with 36.24% against Suárez's 51.67%.

=== President of the Mendoza PJ ===
In November 2020, Fernández Sagasti was elected to preside the Mendoza provincial chapter of the Justicialist Party. Her list ran unopposed. She was sworn in on 19 December 2020, succeeding Guillermo Carmona and becoming the first woman to lead the Mendoza PJ.

== Personal life ==
She was in a ten-year relationship with Lucas Ilardo, a fellow member of La Cámpora.
