= Neighbourhood Action Movement =

Argentine political party

Neighbourhood Action Movement Movimiento de Acción Vecinal
- President: Martín Dandach
- Founded: 1999; 26 years ago
- Membership (2017): ▲12,773
- Ideology: Localism; Centrism
- Political position: Center-right
- Colors: Green
- Seats in the Chamber of Deputies: 0 / 257
- Seats in the Senate: 0 / 72

The Neighbourhood Action Movement (Spanish: Movimiento de Acción Vecinal; MAV) is a national localist political party in Argentina based in Córdoba Province. It was founded in 1999 by Kasem Dandach, an immigrant from Lebanon who served as a provincial lawmaker. It has run its own candidates in presidential elections in 2015 and 2019; both times, it has failed to secure enough votes to cross the threshold mandated by the Mandatory, Open and Simultaneous Primaries (PASO) to participate in the general election. According to them, they are a centrist group, although the media consider them center-right.

According to Raúl Albarracín, the party's leader in Córdoba Province and twice presidential candidate, the Neighbourhood Action Movement stands for a free market economy, supporting regional economies in Argentina's provinces and introducing a reform of the judiciary.

== Electoral performance ==
=== President ===
Election year	Candidate	PASO		Result
Election year	Candidate	# of overall votes	% of overall vote	Result
2015	Raúl Albarracín	39,512	0.18 (11th)	✗ Failed to pass threshold
2019	Raúl Albarracín	36,411	0.14 (9th)	✗ Failed to pass threshold
