= Alberto Asseff =

Argentine politician

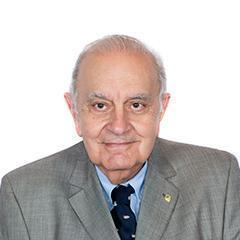

National Deputy
- Incumbent
- Assumed office 10 December 2019
- Constituency: Buenos Aires
- In office 10 December 2011 – 10 December 2015
- Constituency: Buenos Aires

Deputy of the Mercosur Parliament representing Argentina
- In office 2015–2019

Personal details
- Born: 31 October 1942 (age 83)
- Party: UNIR Constitutional Nationalist Party
- Other political affiliations: Juntos por el Cambio

Alberto Emilio Asseff (born 31 October 1942) is an Argentine lawyer and politician who served a National Deputy between 2011 and 2015, reassuming office in 2019.

== Early life and education ==
Asseff graduated at Law at the University of Buenos Aires in 1968, where he started to be politically active in the centrist Civic Radical Union (UCR). After his graduation, he worked as an advisor in some administrations of UCR's politicians like Ricardo Balbín and Arturo Illia. In 1982 he created the Constitutional Nationalist Party, with former members of UCR. In this party was where Alberto Fernández, president of Argentina, made his first steps in politics. Fernandez left the NCP when Asseff started to be identified with some conservative Argentine politicians.

== Political career ==
Asseff served as a National Deputy between 2011 and 2015, representing Buenos Aires province by the alliance between his party UNIR Constitutional Nationalist Party and Compromiso Federal, created by former president Alberto Rodríguez Saá. He was re-elected as a deputy in 2019, but on this occasion for Juntos por el Cambio, in charge since then. Asseff also served as member of Mercosur Parliament from his election in 2015 until 2019 as part of Unidos por una Nueva Alternativa.

For the 2019 Argentine general election, Asseff initially endorsed José Luis Espert for president, but later changed his position and supported Mauricio Macri of Juntos por el Cambio, which was criticized by Espert. He is a cousin of José Asseff, who was president of the Lebanese Club of Buenos Aires.

=== International politics ===
Internationally, Asseff signed the Madrid Charter of the far-right Spanish political party Vox, joining the alliance of right-wing and far-right politicians.
