= Nicolás Emma =

Argentine politician (born 1981)

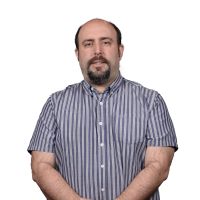
- Emma in 2023

National Deputy
- Incumbent
- Assumed office 7 December 2023
- Preceded by: Javier Milei
- Constituency: City of Buenos Aires

Personal details
- Born: 2 October 1981 (age 44)
- Party: Libertarian Party
- Other political affiliations: La Libertad Avanza

Nicolás Mario Emma (born 2 October 1981) is an Argentine politician serving as a member of the Chamber of Deputies since 2023. During the 2021 legislative election, he served as campaign manager for Javier Milei.
