= UNIR Constitutional Nationalist Party =

Argentine political party

Constitutional Nationalist Party – Union for Integration and Resurgence Partido Nacionalista Constitucional – Unión para la Integración y el Resurgimiento
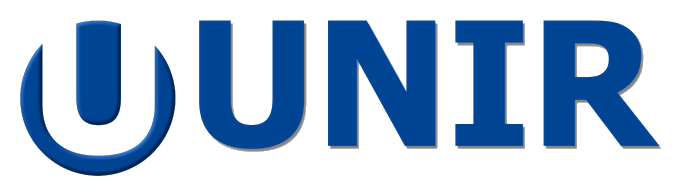
- Leader: Alberto Asseff
- Founded: 1982; 44 years ago
- Membership (2017): ▲26,624
- Ideology: Neo-fascism; Nationalism; Conservatism
- Political position: Far-right
- National affiliation: Juntos por el Cambio
- Colors: Blue
- Seats in the Chamber of Deputies: 1 / 257
- Seats in the Senate: 0 / 72

The Constitutional Nationalist Party – Union for Integration and Resurgence (Spanish: Partido Nacionalista Constitucional – Unión para la Integración y el Resurgimiento, PNC–UNIR), often known by the shortened name UNIR Constitutional Nationalist Party or simply UNIR Party, is a conservative political party in Argentina founded in 1982 by Alberto Asseff, a former member of the Radical Civic Union. It is currently part of the Juntos por el Cambio coalition, and Asseff sits in the Argentine Chamber of Deputies since 2019 representing Buenos Aires Province. For most of its history, it has supported Peronist candidates and alliances. It has hosted candidates and has had neo-Nazi attitudes.
