= Provida =

Chilean pension management company

Administradora de Fondos de Pensiones Provida S.A.
- Type: Public
- Traded as: NYSE: PVD
- Industry: Financial services
- Founded: 1981
- Headquarters: Santiago, Chile
- Key people: Gregorio Ruiz-Esquide (CEO)
- Services: Pension fund management
- Revenue: ▲US$352.6 million (2008)
- Total assets: ▲US$33.0 billion (2008)
- Parent: MetLife
- Website: www.provida.cl

AFP Provida or Administradora de Fondos de Pensiones Provida (English: 'Provida Pension Fund Administrator') is the lead pension fund manager of the Chilean Pension Fund.

== History ==
It was founded in 1981 under the eaves of Decree Law 3.500 in Chile, and launched a private pension system with 59 branches nationwide, replicated in 10 years in Latin American countries (such as Mexico, Ecuador and the Dominican Republic) and also in Eastern Europe.

In 1999, AFP Provida was purchased by Spanish financial group BBVA for $1.54 billion.

In 2013, US insurance company MetLife purchased BBVA's 64.3% stake in AFP Provida for approximately $1.54 billion.
