= Víctor Fayad =

Argentine politician (1955–2014)

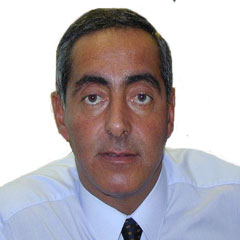

Víctor Manuel Federico Fayad (9 February 1955 – 7 August 2014) was an Argentine politician and lawyer. He was a member of the Radical Civic Union.

Fayad served as Mayor of Mendoza from 10 December 1987 through 10 December 1991, and again from 10 December 2007 until his death on 7 August 2014. Before being mayor of Mendoza, Fayad served in the Argentine Chamber of Deputies from 10 December 1993 through 10 December 2005.

In his municipal driving are attributed, among other things, the beautification of public places and the transformation of the current Sarmiento walkway. On the other hand, has been criticized among other things for its strict policy of not allowing street artists working in the public spaces of the city.

Fayad was born in Mendoza. He was married to Marcela Pérez Caroli until his death in 2014. They had three children.

Fayad died in Mendoza, Argentina, from mediastinum cancer, aged 59.
