= Conservative People's Party (Argentina) =

Argentine political party

Conservative People's Party Partido Conservador Popular
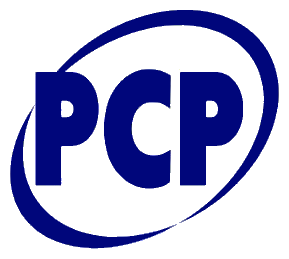
- President: Marco Aurelio Michelli
- Founded: 1958; 68 years ago
- Split from: Democratic Party
- Membership (2017): ▼18,337
- Ideology: Conservatism; Social conservatism
- Political position: Right-wing
- National affiliation: Homeland Force
- Colors: Dark blue
- Seats in the Chamber of Deputies: 0 / 257
- Seats in the Senate: 0 / 72

The Conservative People's Party (Spanish: Partido Conservador Popular; PCP) is a minor social conservative political party in Argentina founded in 1958 by Vicente Solano Lima, who was vice president of Argentina in 1973. It was founded as a split from the Democratic Party (PD), following the 1955 coup that ousted Juan Domingo Perón from the presidency.

A historical ally of Peronism and the Justicialist Party, in recent years, the PCP has backed anti-Peronist parties and alliances, and was one of the founding parties of the Cambiemos coalition in 2015. Ahead of the 2019 general election, the PCP left Cambiemos, and instead joined the newly formed NOS Front, backing the candidacy of Falklands War veteran Juan José Gómez Centurión. Gómez Centurión placed fifth in the presidential race with 2.6% of the vote.

Presently, it has no representation at the federal level.
