= 2019 Argentine general election =

- 27 October 2019
- Opinion polls
- Presidential election
- Registered: 34,231,895
- Turnout: 80.41%
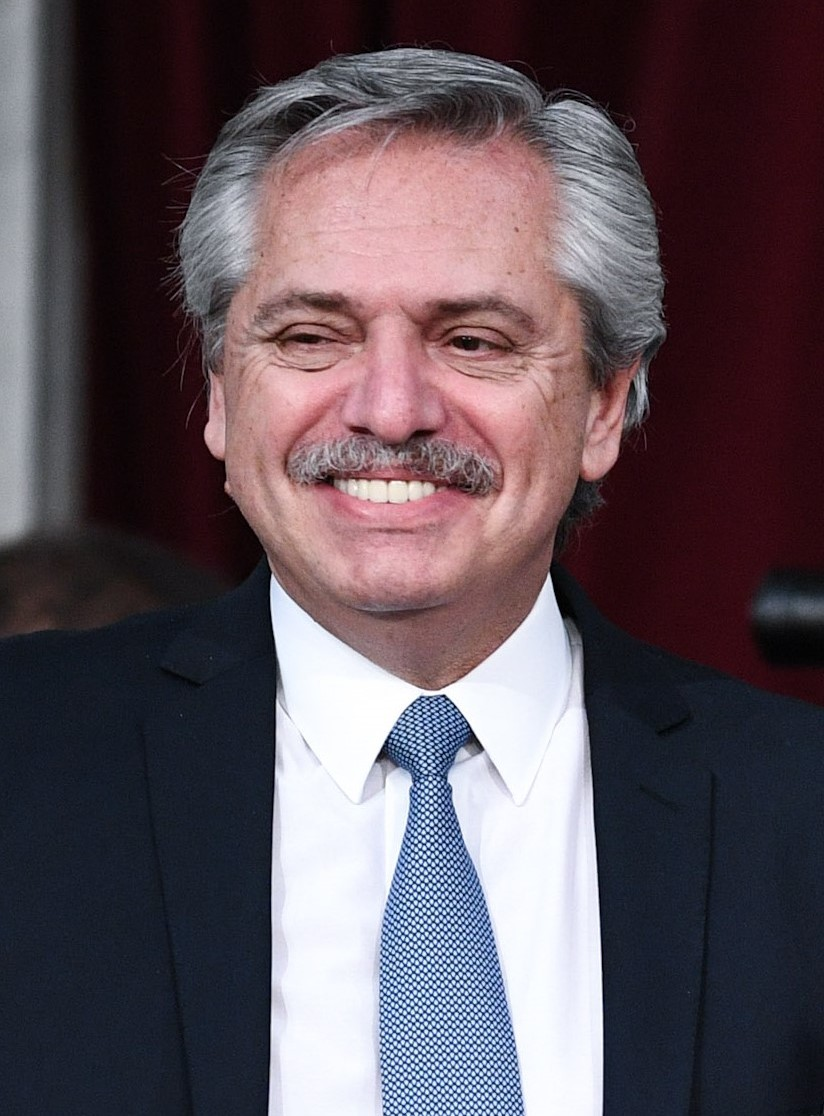

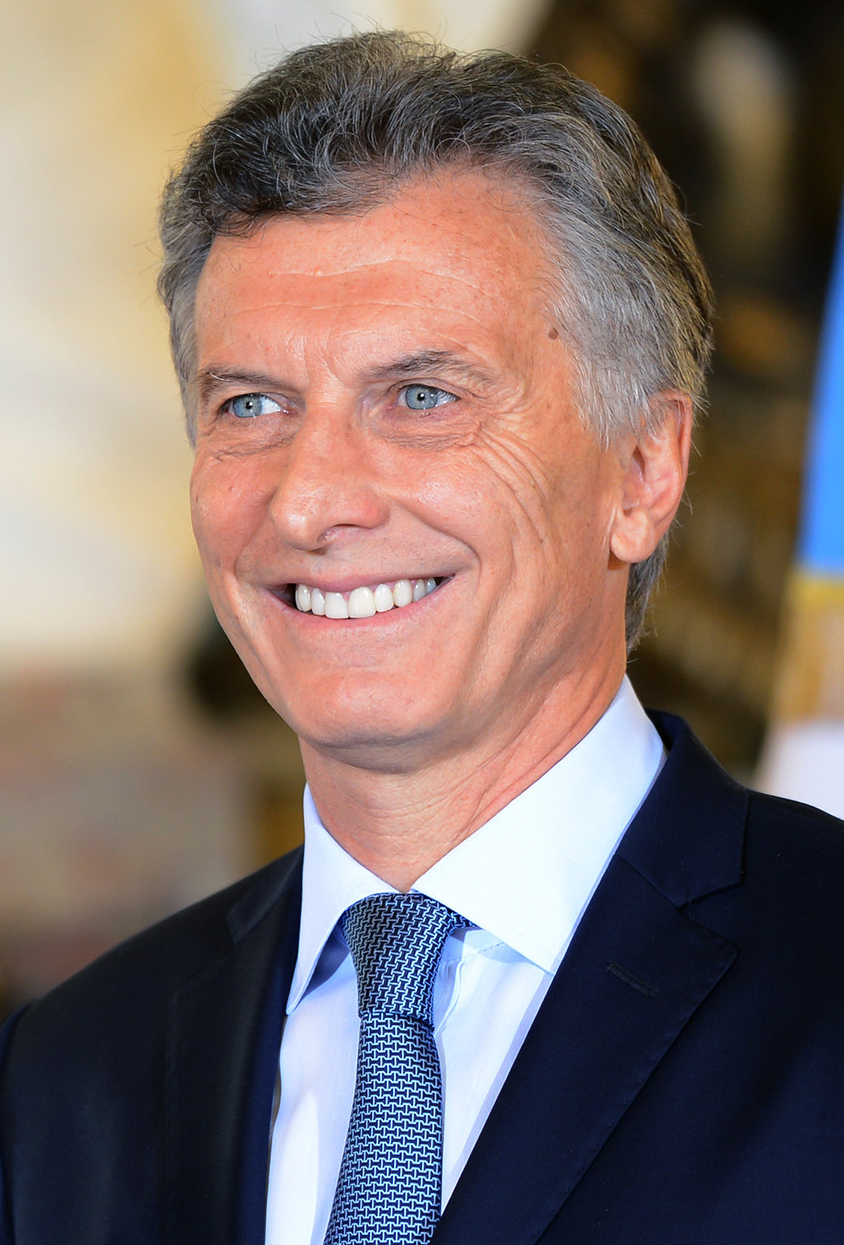

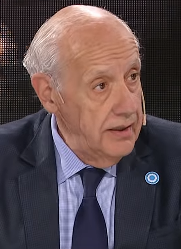
Nominee	Alberto Fernández	Mauricio Macri	Roberto Lavagna
Party	PJ	PRO	Independent
Alliance	FdT	JxC	CF
Running mate	Cristina Fernández de Kirchner	Miguel Ángel Pichetto	Juan Manuel Urtubey
States carried	18	5 + CABA	0
Popular vote	12,946,037	10,811,586	1,649,322
Percentage	48.24%	40.28%	6.15%
President before election
Mauricio Macri
JxC–PRO
Elected President
Alberto Fernández
FDT–PJ
- Chamber of Deputies
- 130 of the 257 seats in the Chamber of Deputies
- Turnout: 80.37%
Party	Vote %	Seats
Frente de Todos	45.26	64
Juntos por el Cambio	40.36	56
Federal Consensus	5.85	3
We Do for Córdoba	1.47	1
Civic Front for Santiago	1.27	3
Front for the Renewal of Concord	0.75	1
Together We Are Río Negro	0.47	1
Let's All Live Better	0.07	1
This lists parties that won seats. See the complete results below.
- Senate
- 24 of the 72 seats in the Senate
- Turnout: 78.27%
Party	Vote %	Seats
Frente de Todos	40.16	13
Juntos por el Cambio	39.22	8
Civic Front for Santiago	5.83	2
Together We Are Río Negro	2.72	1
This lists parties that won seats. See the complete results below.
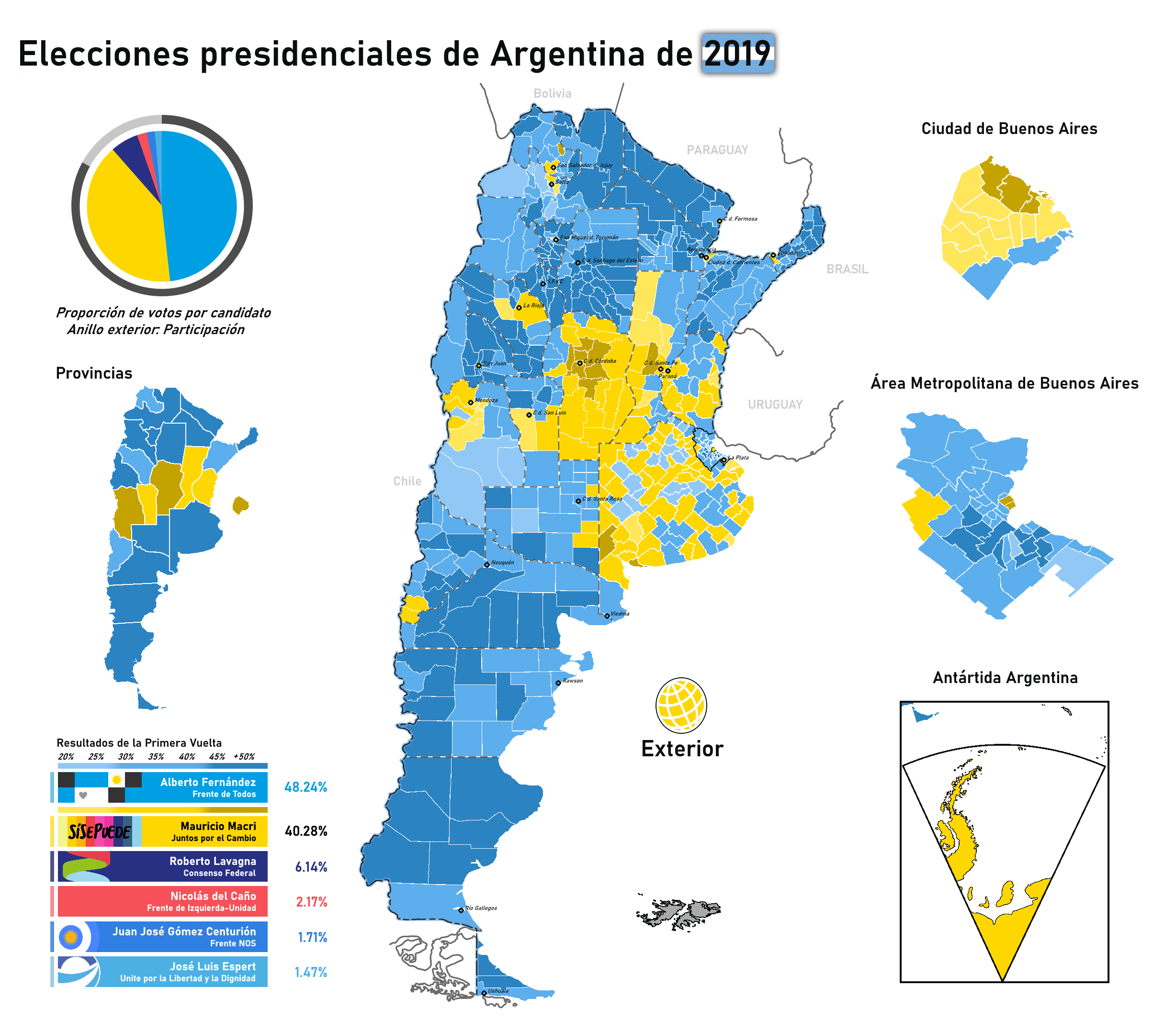

General elections were held in Argentina on 27 October 2019, to elect the president of Argentina, members of the national congress and the governors of most provinces.

The Peronist, left-wing Frente de Todos ticket of Alberto Fernández, former Chief Cabinet, and Cristina Fernández de Kirchner, National Senator and former president, defeated the center-right Juntos por el Cambio ticket of incumbent president Mauricio Macri and conservative Peronist National Senator Miguel Ángel Pichetto, exceeding the threshold to win the presidency in a single round. Macri became the first incumbent president in Argentine history to be defeated in his reelection bid.

== Electoral system ==
The election of the president was conducted under the ballotage system, a modified version of the two-round system. A candidate can win the presidency in a single round by either winning 45% of the vote, or if they win 40% of the vote while finishing 10 percentage points ahead of the second-place candidate. If no candidate meets either threshold, a runoff takes place between the top two candidates. Voting is compulsory for citizens between 18 and 70 years old. Suffrage was also extended to 16- and 17-year-olds, though without compulsory voting.

There are a total of 257 seats of the Chamber of Deputies. They are elected from 24 electoral districts–the 23 provinces, plus the federal district of Buenos Aires, which elects its own executive and legislature and is represented in the national Congress like all other provinces. The number of seats are distributed in relation to the population of the province. One-third of the seats in the Chamber of Deputies are reserved for women. The 130 seats of the Chamber of Deputies up for election were elected from 24 multi-member constituencies based on the 23 provinces and Buenos Aires. Seats were allocated using the D'Hondt method of proportional representation, with an electoral threshold of 3%.

The 24 seats in the Senate up for election were elected in three-seat constituencies using the closed list system. Each district is represented by three senatorial seats. Each party is allowed to register up to two candidates; one of those registered must be female. The party receiving the most votes wins two seats, and the second-placed party wins one. The third senatorial seat was established in the Constitution of 1994 in order to better represent the largest minority in each district.

=== Congress ===
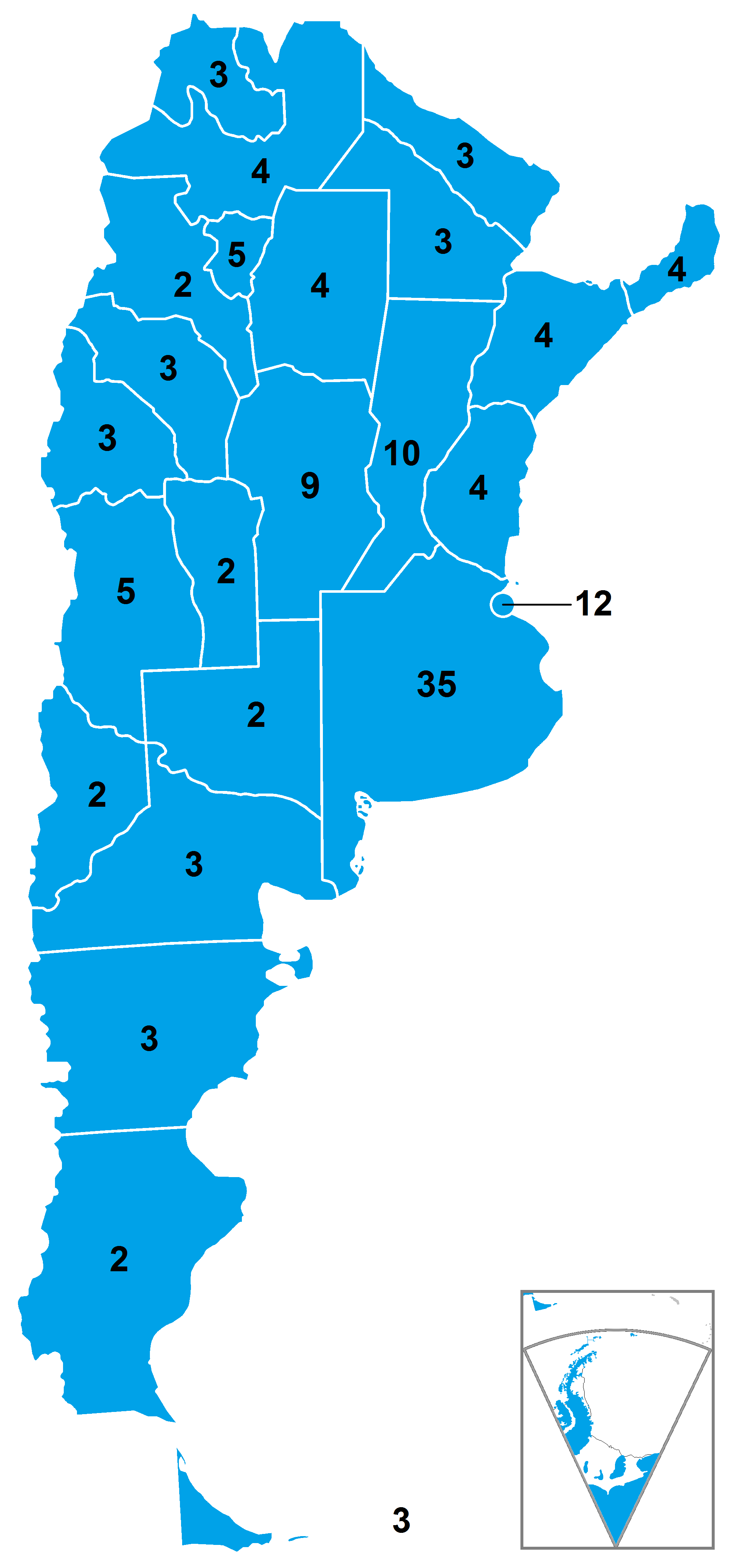
Number of deputies at stake in each province.

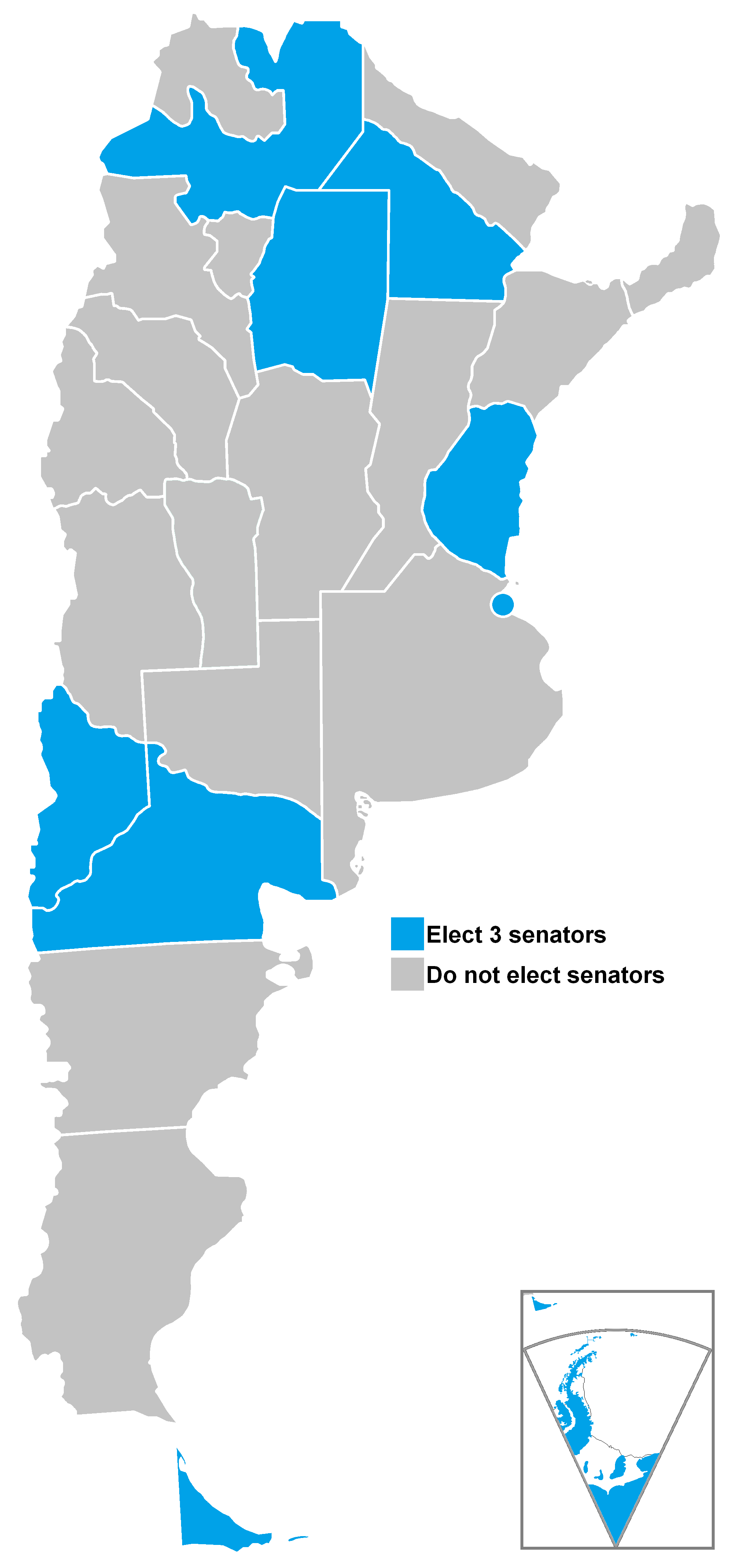
Provinces that elected senators in blue.

==== Chamber of Deputies ====
The 257 members of the Chamber of Deputies are elected by proportional representation in 24 multi-member constituencies based on the provinces (plus the City of Buenos Aires). Seats are allocated using the d'Hondt method with a 3% electoral threshold. In this election, 130 of the 257 seats are up for renewal for a 4-year term.

Province	Total seats	Seats at stake
Buenos Aires	70	35
Buenos Aires City	25	12
Catamarca	5	2
Chaco	7	3
Chubut	5	3
Córdoba	18	9
Corrientes	7	4
Entre Ríos	9	4
Formosa	5	3
Jujuy	6	3
La Pampa	5	2
La Rioja	5	3
Mendoza	10	5
Misiones	7	4
Neuquén	5	2
Río Negro	5	3
Salta	7	4
San Juan	6	3
San Luis	5	2
Santa Cruz	5	2
Santa Fe	19	10
Santiago del Estero	7	4
Tierra del Fuego	5	3
Tucumán	9	5
Total	257	130

==== Senate ====
The 72 members of the Senate are elected in the same 24 constituencies, with three seats in each. The party receiving the most votes in each constituency wins two seats, with the third seat awarded to the second-placed party. The 2019 elections will see one-third of senators renewed, with eight provinces electing three senators for a 6-year term; Buenos Aires City, Chaco, Entre Ríos, Neuquén, Río Negro, Salta, Santiago del Estero and Tierra del Fuego.

== Candidates ==
The following candidates successfully registered their nominations before the limit date of 22 June 2019, and went on to compete in the Open, Simultaneous and Mandatory Primaries (PASO) on 11 August 2019.

Presidential candidate (political party)	Vice-presidential candidate (political party)	Coalition	Coalition parties	Presidential candidate prior political offices
Alberto Fernández (PJ)	Cristina Fernández de Kirchner (PJ)		Justicialist Party; Intransigent Party; Renewal Front; Communist Party; Communist Party (Extraordinary Congress); Humanist Party; Broad Front Party; Victory Party; Solidary Party; Kolina; New Encounter; Federal Commitment; Concertation Party; Proyecto Sur; National Alfonsinist Movement; Revolutionary Communist Party; Popular Unity; We Are; Green Party	Chief of the Cabinet of Ministers (2003–2008)
Mauricio Macri (PRO)	Miguel Ángel Pichetto (PJ)		Republican Proposal; Radical Civic Union; Civic Coalition; Democratic Progressive Party; Faith Party; Dialogue Party; Integration and Development Movement; Popular Union; Constitutional Nationalist Party	President of Argentina (since 2015); Chief of Government of Buenos Aires (2007–2015)
Roberto Lavagna (Independent)	Juan Manuel Urtubey (PJ)		Generation for a National Encounter; Freemen of the South Movement; Federal Party; Socialist Party; Christian Democratic Party; Third Position Party; Light Blue and White Union	Minister of Economy and Production (2003–2005)
Nicolás del Caño (PTS)	Romina Del Plá (PO)		Socialist Workers' Party; Workers' Party; Socialist Left; Workers' Socialist Movement; Unified Socialist Workers' Party; People's Power	National Deputy from Buenos Aires (since 2017)
José Luis Espert (PL)	Luis Rosales (PL)		Union of the Democratic Centre; Libertarian Party	None (economist and professor)
Alejandro Biondini (BV)	Enrique Venturino (BV)		People's Countryside Party; People's Party; Neighborhood Flag; People In Action; Popular Dignity; Labour Party; The Movement	None (founder and president of Bandera Vecinal)
Manuela Castañeira (Nuevo MAS)	Eduardo Mulhall (Nuevo MAS)			None (sociologist)
Juan José Gómez Centurión (NOS)	Cynthia Hotton (Valores para mi País)			Vice-president of the Bank of the Argentine Nation (2017–2019)
José Antonio Romero Feris (PAN)	Guillermo Sueldo (PAN)			National Senator for Corrientes (1987–2001); Governor of Corrientes (1983–1987)
Raúl Humberto Albarracín (Neighbourhood Action Movement)	Sergio Darío Pastore (Neighbourhood Action Movement)			Provincial legislator of Córdoba (2007–2011)

== Results ==
=== Primary elections ===
Open primary elections for the presidency were held nationwide on 11 August. With this system, all parties run primary elections on a single ballot. All parties must take part in it, both the parties with internal factions and parties with a single candidate list. Citizens may vote for any candidate of any party, but may only cast a single vote. The most voted candidate of parties gaining 1.5% or higher of the valid votes advances to the general election.

Fernández came top with 47.8% of the vote, with Macri trailing behind with 31.8%. Lavagna, del Caño, Gómez Centurión and Espert all received enough valid votes to participate in the general election.

Candidate	Running mate	Party	Votes	%
Alberto Fernández	Cristina Fernández de Kirchner	Frente de Todos	12,205,938	47.79
Mauricio Macri	Miguel Ángel Pichetto	Juntos por el Cambio	8,121,689	31.80
Roberto Lavagna	Juan Manuel Urtubey	Federal Consensus	2,081,315	8.15
Nicolás del Caño	Romina Del Plá	Workers' Left Front	723,147	2.83
Juan José Gómez Centurión	Cynthia Hotton	NOS	670,162	2.62
José Luis Espert	Luis Rosales	Unite por la Libertad y la Dignidad	550,593	2.16
Manuela Castañeira	Eduardo Mulhall	Movimiento al Socialismo	179,461	0.70
Alejandro Biondini	Enrique Venturino	Patriotic Front	58,944	0.23
Raúl Albarracín	Sergio Pastore	Neighbourhood Action Movement	36,411	0.14
José Antonio Feris	Guillermo Sueldo	Autonomist Party	32,722	0.13
Blank votes			882,659	3.46
Total			25,543,041	100.00
Valid votes			25,543,041	98.77
Invalid/blank votes			318,009	1.23
Total votes			25,861,050	100.00
Registered voters/turnout			33,871,832	76.35
Source: Padron, DINE

=== President ===
Most voted party by winner strength.

Fernández owed his victory mostly to Buenos Aires Province swinging over dramatically to support him; he carried it by over 1.6 million votes over Macri, accounting for almost all of his nationwide margin of 2.1 million votes. By comparison, Daniel Scioli only carried the province by 219,000 votes in 2015.

Candidate	Running mate	Party	Votes	%
Alberto Fernández	Cristina Fernández de Kirchner	Frente de Todos	12,946,037	48.24
Mauricio Macri	Miguel Ángel Pichetto	Juntos por el Cambio	10,811,586	40.28
Roberto Lavagna	Juan Manuel Urtubey	Federal Consensus	1,649,322	6.15
Nicolás del Caño	Romina Del Plá	Workers' Left Front	579,228	2.16
Juan José Gómez Centurión	Cynthia Hotton	NOS	457,956	1.71
José Luis Espert	Luis Rosales	Unite por la Libertad y la Dignidad	394,207	1.47
Total			26,838,336	100.00
Valid votes			26,838,336	97.50
Invalid votes			252,388	0.92
Blank votes			434,379	1.58
Total votes			27,525,103	100.00
Registered voters/turnout			34,231,895	80.41
Source: Padron, DINE

==== Results by district ====
Province	Fernández/Kirchner (FdT)		Macri/Pichetto (JxC)		Lavagna/Urtubey (CF)		Del Caño/del Plá (FIT–U)		G. Centurión/Hotton (NOS)		Espert/Rosales (UNITE)		Blanks/Invalid		Turnout		Margin	
Province	Votes	%	Votes	%	Votes	%	Votes	%	Votes	%	Votes	%	Votes	%	Votes	%	Votes	%
Buenos Aires	5,294,879	52.20	3,640,552	35.89	638,990	6.30	273,495	2.70	150,067	1.48	145,743	1.43	230,767	2.22	10,374,493	82.19	1,654,327	16.31
Buenos Aires City	719,655	35.46	1,068,134	52.64	130,475	6.43	59,066	2.91	13,863	0.68	38,013	1.87	46,228	2.23	2,075,434	76.85	-348,479	-17.18
Catamarca	132,590	56.66	79,568	34.00	13,197	5.64	3,508	1.50	2,136	0.91	3,011	1.29	24,941	9.63	258,951	81.04	53,022	22.66
Chaco	404,758	55.73	258,432	35.58	27,636	3.81	6,986	0.96	20,617	2.84	7,856	1.08	11,370	1.54	737,655	77.61	146,326	20.15
Chubut	174,726	52.42	97,837	29.35	25,357	7.61	13,117	3.94	14,253	4.28	8,029	2.40	14,289	4.11	347,608	77.78	76,889	23.07
Córdoba	666,445	29.31	1,394,104	61.31	113,734	5.00	37,612	1.65	31,869	1.40	30,213	1.33	68,489	2.93	2,342,466	79.01	-727,659	-32.00
Corrientes	354,968	51.19	290,690	41.92	21,658	3.12	6,522	0.94	12,515	1.80	7,044	1.02	13,427	1.90	706,824	80.75	64,278	9.27
Entre Ríos	390,587	44.37	391,495	44.47	55,030	6.25	14,504	1.65	14,647	1.66	14,111	1.60	14,576	1.63	894,950	80.59	-908	-0.10
Formosa	229,774	65.21	100,280	28.46	11,057	3.14	3,112	0.88	5,334	1.51	2,797	0.79	5,137	1.44	357,491	77.75	129,494	36.75
Jujuy	207,120	46.19	186,104	41.50	26,835	5.98	9,214	2.05	10,512	2.34	8,617	1.92	8,714	1.91	457,116	81.79	21,016	4.69
La Pampa	115,095	50.07	86,744	37.74	15,137	6.59	4,727	2.06	4,676	2.03	3,471	1.51	3,665	1.57	233,515	81.25	28,351	12.33
La Rioja	85,779	47.37	80,462	44.43	7,844	4.33	2,127	1.17	2,087	1.15	2,801	1.55	52,964	22.63	234,064	80.78	5,317	2.94
Mendoza	435,313	37.83	576,493	50.10	75,448	6.56	26,315	2.29	22,715	1.97	14,370	1.25	23,902	2.03	1,174,556	81.10	-141,180	-12.27
Misiones	417,752	57.71	245,254	33.88	24,451	3.38	6,704	0.93	21,239	2.93	8,537	1.18	18,551	2.50	742,488	79.90	172,498	23.83
Neuquén	194,205	47.73	151,939	37.34	25,628	6.30	15,209	3.74	11,743	2.89	8,167	2.01	20,018	4.72	426,909	83.94	42,266	10.39
Río Negro	247,664	57.23	123,674	28.58	27,483	6.35	11,252	2.60	14,173	3.28	8,482	1.96	19,431	4.30	452,159	80.35	123,990	28.65
Salta	374,369	48.82	266,406	34.74	82,358	10.74	13,625	1.78	16,635	2.17	13,378	1.74	17,608	2.24	784,379	76.11	107,963	14.08
San Juan	242,060	53.01	160,449	35.14	33,004	7.23	6,928	1.52	8,388	1.84	5,759	1.26	8,341	1.79	464,929	82.44	81,611	17.87
San Luis	129,118	41.68	139,479	45.03	20,954	6.76	7,171	2.32	7,683	2.48	5,354	1.73	8,076	2.54	317,835	81.53	-10,361	-3.35
Santa Cruz	108,323	59.77	51,183	28.24	9,123	5.03	6,032	3.33	5,171	2.85	1,402	0.77	7,649	4.05	188,883	74.73	57,140	31.53
Santa Fe	920,202	42.68	937,611	43.49	193,603	8.98	30,862	1.43	33,247	1.54	40,353	1.87	43,662	1.99	2,199,540	79.48	-17,409	-0.81
Santiago del Estero	451,082	74.95	110,525	18.37	20,103	3.34	5,755	0.96	9,220	1.53	5,123	0.85	9,924	1.62	611,732	80.45	340,557	56.58
Tierra del Fuego	57,887	56.93	26,529	26.09	7,785	7.66	2,760	2.71	3,925	3.86	2,803	2.76	3,208	3.06	104,897	75.88	31,358	30.84
Tucumán	591,686	57.76	347,642	33.94	42,432	4.14	12,598	1.23	21,241	2.07	8,773	0.86	17,801	1.71	1,042,173	82.84	244,044	23.82
Total	12,946,037	48.24	10,811,586	40.28	1,649,322	6.14	579,228	2.16	457,956	1.71	394,207	1.47	686,767	2.52	27,525,103	80.41	2,134,501	7.96

=== Chamber of Deputies ===
Party or alliance		Votes	%	Seats	
Party or alliance		Votes	%	Won	Total
Frente de Todos		11,606,411	45.26	64	112
Juntos por el Cambio		10,347,605	40.36	56	119
Federal Consensus	Federal Consensus	1,178,627	4.60	3	5
Federal Consensus	Socialist Party	90,719	0.35	0	2
Federal Consensus	Union for Salta	83,633	0.33	0	0
Federal Consensus	Protector Political Force	74,138	0.29	0	1
Federal Consensus	Generation for a National Encounter	25,246	0.10	0	0
Federal Consensus	Social Pole Movement	22,636	0.09	0	0
Federal Consensus	Freemen of the South Movement	18,585	0.07	0	0
Federal Consensus	Authentic Renewal Front	6,858	0.03	0	0
Federal Consensus	Total	1,500,442	5.85	3	8
Workers' Left Front	Workers' Left Front	742,128	2.89	0	2
Workers' Left Front	Workers' Socialist Movement	19,671	0.08	0	0
Workers' Left Front	Workers' Party	3,651	0.01	0	0
Workers' Left Front	Total	765,450	2.99	0	2
We Do for Córdoba		377,844	1.47	1	4
Civic Front for Santiago		326,566	1.27	3	6
Front for the Renewal of Concord		191,876	0.75	1	3
Together We Are Río Negro		121,478	0.47	1	1
Unite por la Libertad y la Dignidad		113,812	0.44	0	0
NOS	Republican Force	55,713	0.22	0	0
NOS	Conservative People's Party	22,048	0.09	0	0
NOS	Acción Chaqueña	21,173	0.08	0	0
NOS	Citizens to Govern Party	12,976	0.05	0	0
NOS	Total	111,910	0.44	0	0
Neuquén People's Movement		78,342	0.31	0	1
Encuentro Vecinal Córdoba		44,642	0.17	0	0
Self-determination and Freedom		24,685	0.10	0	0
Let's All Live Better		17,992	0.07	1	1
Independent Party of Chubut		5,172	0.02	0	0
Patagonian Social Party		4,727	0.02	0	0
Partido Es Posible		2,181	0.01	0	0
Total		25,641,135	100.00	130	257
Valid votes		25,641,135	93.20		
Invalid votes		274,322	1.00		
Blank votes		1,596,110	5.80		
Total votes		27,511,567	100.00		
Registered voters/turnout		34,231,895	80.37		
Source: Padron, DINE

==== Results by province ====
Province	FdT			JxC			CF			Others		
Province	Votes	%	Seats	Votes	%	Seats	Votes	%	Seats	Votes	%	Seats
Buenos Aires	5,113,359	52.64	19	3,668,580	37.77	14	583,699	6.01	2	348,501	3.59	—
Buenos Aires City	641,054	32.05	4	1,060,404	53.02	8	114,968	5.75	—	183,665	9.18	—
Catamarca	133,327	61.32	1	73,578	33.84	1	10,516	4.84	—	—	—	—
Chaco	397,472	56.70	2	255,528	36.45	1	26,778	3.82	—	21,173	3.02	—
Chubut	160,996	53.45	2	97,245	32.29	1	22,636	7.52	—	20,327	6.75	—
Córdoba	495,823	22.31	2	1,140,338	51.32	6	79,098	3.56	—	506,732	22.81	1
Corrientes	336,448	50.98	2	290,463	44.01	2	20,120	3.05	—	12,976	1.97	—
Entre Ríos	380,614	45.20	2	384,968	45.72	2	56,786	6.74	—	19,671	2.34	—
Formosa	225,608	67.01	2	99,305	29.49	1	11,780	3.50	—	—	—	—
Jujuy	189,305	45.40	2	180,877	43.38	1	29,030	6.96	—	17,721	4.25	—
La Pampa	114,079	51.63	1	87,049	39.40	1	14,627	6.62	—	5,197	2.35	—
La Rioja	70,564	52.18	2	60,498	44.73	1	—	—	—	4,179	3.09	—
Mendoza	423,002	37.99	2	583,897	52.44	3	74,138	6.66	—	32,343	2.90	—
Misiones	234,404	34.94	2	225,232	33.58	1	19,306	2.88	—	191,876	28.60	1
Neuquén	137,285	36.39	1	123,386	32.70	1	17,602	4.67	—	99,025	26.25	—
Río Negro	170,935	45.10	2	71,949	18.98	—	—	—	—	136,107	35.91	1
Salta	328,966	46.68	2	244,225	34.65	2	83,633	11.87	—	47,920	6.80	—
San Juan	239,426	54.79	2	167,672	38.37	1	29,867	6.84	—	—	—	—
San Luis	126,592	43.87	1	134,668	46.67	1	18,622	6.45	—	8,701	3.02	—
Santa Cruz	96,658	62.13	2	45,586	29.30	—	6,858	4.41	—	6,474	4.16	—
Santa Fe	890,561	42.26	4	912,407	43.30	5	210,773	10.00	1	93,358	4.43	—
Santiago del Estero	125,609	21.88	1	103,411	18.01	—	18,585	3.24	—	326,566	56.88	3
Tierra del Fuego	33,878	38.67	1	20,747	23.68	1	6,624	7.56	—	26,370	30.10	1
Tucumán	540,446	55.25	3	315,592	32.26	2	44,396	4.54	—	77,795	7.95	—
Total	11,606,411	45.26	64	10,347,605	40.36	56	1,500,442	5.85	3	2,186,677	8.53	7

=== Senate ===
Party or alliance		Votes	%	Seats	
Party or alliance		Votes	%	Won	Total
Frente de Todos		2,263,221	40.16	13	39
Juntos por el Cambio		2,210,310	39.22	8	28
Federal Consensus	Federal Consensus	159,271	2.83	0	0
Federal Consensus	Union for Salta	85,601	1.52	0	0
Federal Consensus	Socialist Party	56,606	1.00	0	0
Federal Consensus	Freemen of the South Movement	18,344	0.33	0	0
Federal Consensus	Generation for a National Encounter	8,144	0.14	0	0
Federal Consensus	Total	327,966	5.82	0	0
Workers' Left Front	Workers' Left Front	140,792	2.50	0	0
Workers' Left Front	Workers' Socialist Movement	18,718	0.33	0	0
Workers' Left Front	Workers' Party	2,815	0.05	0	0
Workers' Left Front	Total	162,325	2.88	0	0
Civic Front for Santiago		328,627	5.83	2	2
Together We Are Río Negro		153,338	2.72	1	1
Neuquén People's Movement		85,617	1.52	0	0
NOS	Conservative People's Party	22,305	0.40	0	0
NOS	Acción Chaqueña	21,191	0.38	0	0
NOS	Total	43,496	0.77	0	0
Unite por la Libertad y la Dignidad		38,970	0.69	0	0
Let's All Live Better		17,210	0.31	0	0
Patagonian Social Party		4,826	0.09	0	0
Federal Peronism				0	1
Front for the Renewal of Concord				0	1
Total		5,635,906	100.00	24	72
Valid votes		5,635,906	92.64		
Invalid votes		64,463	1.06		
Blank votes		383,031	6.30		
Total votes		6,083,400	100.00		
Registered voters/turnout		7,772,500	78.27		
Source: Padron, DINE

==== Results by province ====
Province	FdT			JxC			CF			Others		
Province	Votes	%	Seats	Votes	%	Seats	Votes	%	Seats	Votes	%	Seats
Buenos Aires City	679,569	34.08	1	1,076,452	53.99	2	114,907	5.76	—	122,892	6.16	—
Chaco	400,188	56.98	2	254,215	36.19	1	26,766	3.81	—	21,191	3.02	—
Entre Ríos	383,238	45.47	1	384,300	45.59	2	56,606	6.72	—	18,718	2.22	—
Neuquén	136,350	35.66	2	123,490	32.30	1	17,598	4.60	—	104,936	27.44	—
Río Negro	169,726	50.38	2	—	—	—	—	—	—	167,181	49.62	1
Salta	330,324	46.55	2	247,699	34.91	1	85,601	12.06	—	46,013	6.48	—
Santiago del Estero	126,413	21.91	1	103,581	17.95	—	18,344	3.18	—	328,627	56.96	2
Tierra del Fuego	37,413	41.12	2	20,573	22.61	1	8,144	8.95	—	24,851	27.31	—
Total	2,263,221	40.16	13	2,210,310	39.22	8	327,966	5.82	0	834,409	14.81	3

=== Provincial elections ===
Date	District	Offices	Winner	Runner-up
10 March	Neuquén	Governor Vice Governor 35 provincial deputies	Omar Gutiérrez - Marcos Koopmann (Neuquén People's Movement) (40,19 %)	Ramón Rioseco - Darío Martínez (Neuquin Front–Citizens' Unity) (25,93 %)
7 April	Río Negro	Governor Vice Governor 46 provincial deputies	Arabela Carreras - Alejandro Palmieri (Together We Are Río Negro) (52,63 %)	Martín Soria - Magdalena Odarda (Front for Victory) (34,97 %)
12 May	Córdoba	Governor Vice Governor 70 provincial deputies	Juan Schiaretti - Manuel Calvo (We Do for Córdoba) (57,38 %)	Mario Negri - Héctor Baldassi (Córdoba Changes) (18,85 %)
19 May	La Pampa	Governor Vice Governor 30 provincial deputies	Sergio Ziliotto - Mariano Fernández (La Pampa Justicialist Front) (52,68 %)	Daniel Kroneberger - Luis Evangelista (Cambiemos La Pampa) (31,80 %)
2 June	Misiones	Governor Vice Governor 20 provincial deputies	Oscar Herrera Ahuad - Carlos Omar Arce (Front for the Renewal of Concord) (72,81 %)	Humberto Schiavoni - Luis Mario Pastori (Together for Change) (17,59 %)
2 June	San Juan	Governor Vice Governor 36 provincial deputies	Sergio Uñac - Roberto Gattoni (Everyone Front) (55,84 %)	Marcelo Orrego - Susana Laciar (Front with You) (33,91 %)
9 June	Chubut	Governor Vice Governor 27 provincial deputies	Mariano Arcioni - Ricardo Sastre (Chubut Ahead) (41,35 %)	Carlos Linares - Claudia Bard (Chubut Patriotic Front) (33,97 %)
9 June	Entre Ríos	Governor Vice Governor 34 provincial deputies 17 provincial senators	Gustavo Bordet - María Laura Stratta (Believe Entre Ríos) (57,43 %)	Atilio Benedetti - Gustavo Hein (Cambiemos) (35,57 %)
9 June	Jujuy	Governor Vice Governor 24 provincial deputies	Gerardo Morales - Carlos Haquim (Change Jujuy) (43,76 %)	Julio Ferreyra - Adrián Mendieta (Justicialist Front) (32,77 %)
9 June	Tucumán	Governor Vice Governor 49 provincial deputies	Juan Luis Manzur - Osvaldo Jaldo (Justicialist Front for Tucumán) (51,86 %)	Silvia Elías de Pérez - José Manuel Paz (Let's Go Tucumán) (20,41 %)
16 June	Formosa	Governor Vice Governor 15 provincial deputies	Gildo Insfrán - Eber Wilson Solís (Justicialist Party) (70,66 %)	Adrián Bogado - Iván Nicolás Kaluk (Formosan Broad Front) (28,89 %)
16 June	San Luis	Governor Vice Governor 21 provincial deputies 5 provincial senators	Alberto Rodríguez Saá - Eduardo Mones Ruiz (Justicialist Unity) (42,34 %)	Claudio Poggi - Enrique Ariel Ponce (United San Luis) (34,54 %)
16 June	Santa Fe	Governor Vice Governor 50 provincial deputies 19 provincial senators	Omar Perotti - Alejandra Rodenas (Together Front) (42,31 %)	Antonio Bonfatti - María Victoria Tejeda (Progressive, Civic and Social Front) (37,91 %)
16 June	Tierra del Fuego	Governor Vice Governor 15 provincial deputies	Gustavo Melella - Mónica Urquiza (FORJA) (55,03 %)	Rosana Bertone - Juan Carlos Arcando (Fueguin Unity) (40,86 %)
11 August	Santa Cruz	Governor Vice Governor 24 provincial deputies	Alicia Kirchner - Eugenio Quiroga (Santacruzean Accord) (58,59%)	Eduardo Costa - Liliana Andrade (To get out ahead) (32,03%)
29 September	Mendoza	Governor Vice Governor 24 provincial deputies 19 provincial senators	Rodolfo Suárez - Mario Abed (Change Mendoza) (51,63%)	Anabel Fernández Sagasti - Jorge Tanus (Choose Mendoza) (36,21%)
13 October	Chaco	Governor Vice Governor 16 provincial deputies	Jorge Capitanich - Analía Rach Quiroga (Chaqueño Front) (49,32%)	Carim Peche - Roy Nikisch (We Are All Chaco) (31,40%)
27 October	Buenos Aires (in detail)	Governor Vice Governor 46 provincial deputies 23 provincial senators	Axel Kicillof - Verónica Magario (Everyone's Front) (52,28%)	María Eugenia Vidal - Daniel Salvador (Together for Change) (38,39%)
27 October	Catamarca	Governor Vice Governor 20 provincial deputies 8 provincial senators	Raúl Jalil - Rubén Dusso (Everyone's Front) (60,40%)	Roberto Gómez - Lía Quiroga (Together for Change) (33,46%)
27 October	Buenos Aires City (in detail)	Chief of Government Vice Chief of Government 30 legislators	Horacio Rodríguez Larreta - Diego Santilli (Together for Change) (55,90%)	Matías Lammens - Gisela Marziotta (Everyone's Front) (35,06%)
27 October	La Rioja	Governor Vice Governor 18 provincial deputies	Ricardo Quintela - Florencia López (Everyone's Front) (40,84%)	Julio Martínez - Teresita Luna (Together for La Rioja) (27,90%)
10 November	Salta	Governor Vice Governor 30 provincial deputies 11 provincial senators	Gustavo Sáenz - Antonio Marocco (Sáenz Governor Front) (53,85%)	Sergio Leavy - Emiliano Estrada (Everyone's Front) (26,00%)
