= Cynthia Hotton =

Argentine politician (born 1969)

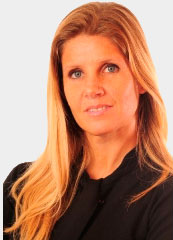

National Deputy
- In office 10 December 2007 – 10 December 2011
- Constituency: City of Buenos Aires

Personal details
- Born: January 17, 1969 (age 57) Buenos Aires
- Party: Recreate for Growth (2002-2009); Values for my Country (2009- present)
- Other political affiliations: Republican Proposal (2005-2007); NOS Front (2019-present) +Valores (currently)
- Website: www.cynthiahotton.com.ar

Cynthia Hotton (born 17 January 1969) is an Argentine politician, former National Deputy, and candidate for Vice President.

== Early life ==
Cynthia Hotton was born on 17 January 1969 in Buenos Aires to Arturo Hotton Risler, whose parents had emigrated to Argentina from Australia at the beginning of the 20th century.

== Political career ==
Hotton began her political career with Ricardo López Murphy's party, Recreate for Growth, which merged with Republican Proposal. In March 2009, she launched the Valores para mi país party, formally breaking from the Republican Proposal in August of that same year. Hotton promoted the conservative party as being the emphatic opposition to the legalization of abortion. In May 2010, she was one of the primary opponents to same-sex marriage in Argentina in the Chamber of Deputies, leading demonstrations against the passing of same-sex marriage in July.

During the devising of the 2011 budget for the Government of Argentina, Hotton denounced an alleged attempt at bribery through text messages.
