= Juan José Gómez Centurión =

Argentine soldier and politician

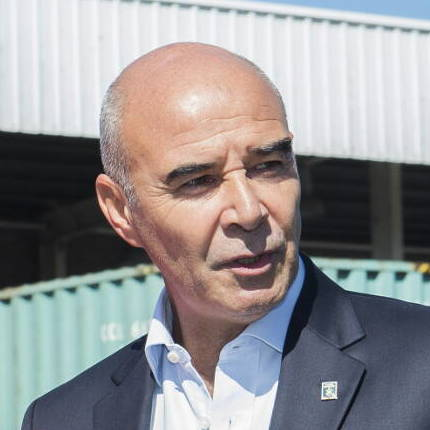
Gómez-Centurión in 2017

Juan José Gómez-Centurión (born 26 May 1958) is an Argentine soldier and politician.

He is a retired officer of the Argentine Army, a veteran of the Falklands War, where he received the Cross to the Heroic Valour in Combat, the highest military distinction.

== Politics ==
He was a candidate for President of Argentina by the NOS Front for the 2019 elections.
