= José Luis Espert =

Argentine economist and politician (born 1961)

Jose Luis Espert
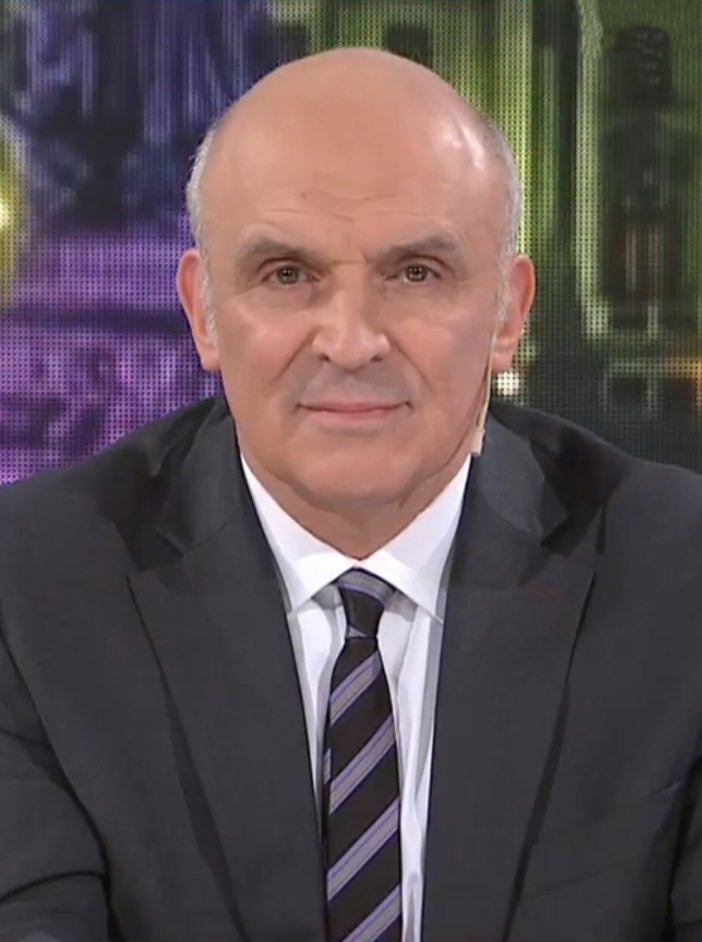

National Deputy
- Incumbent
- Assumed office 10 December 2021
- Constituency: Buenos Aires

Personal details
- Born: 21 November 1961 (age 64) Pergamino, Argentina
- Party: Independent
- Other political affiliations: Avanza Libertad (2019–2024); Juntos por el Cambio (2023); La Libertad Avanza (since 2024)
- Institution: University of Buenos Aires (BA); National University of Tucumán (MA); University of CEMA (MA, PhD)
- Awards: Fundación Atlas 1853 (2009); Federalismo y Libertad Foundation

José Luis Espert (born 21 November 1961) is an Argentine economist and politician. He is known to be one of the strongest supporters of economic liberalism in Argentina. He was elected National Deputy for the Province of Buenos Aires in the 2021 Argentine legislative election. He was the founder and leader of the Avanza Libertad coalition, and in 2023 he briefly became a member of Juntos por el Cambio. In 2024 he joined La Libertad Avanza.

Espert supports free trade, proposes to deepen the commercial opening with the world, and attacks Mercosur for what he describes as its limitations to this. He is against the "corporations that devour the country"; he proposes that the country "change the system for another". With his ideology, he seeks to position himself as the only representative of liberalism. Espert considers himself a "common citizen", criticizes Mauricio Macri and Alberto Fernández, and claims to be the sole opposition figure to Kirchnerism.

== Education and career ==
Espert was born in Pergamino to a Catalan father and an Argentine mother. His father, who died in 2018, was a prominent businessman linked to the rural sector. Espert studied economics at the University of Buenos Aires (UBA), later earning a master's degree in economics at the University of CEMA (UCEMA), and a master's in Statistics at the National University of Tucumán.

He started working at the Miguel Ángel Broda firm where he was a monetary policy analyst, later to become a chief economist at the same institution. He also worked as an econometrist at Estudio Arriazu firm and was a partner at Econométrica S.A. In 2000, he founded his own firm, Estudio Espert, which offers macroeconomic consultancy and Asset Management.

He is a member of the Argentine Association of Political Economy (Asociación Argentina de Economía Política). He was Econometrics professor at UBA and Public Finances professor at UCEMA.

He is a columnist in different newspapers, such as La Nación and El País from Uruguay. In 2015, he was interviewed by José del Río at a La Nación program, which became the second-most viewed interview of the year.

== Politics ==
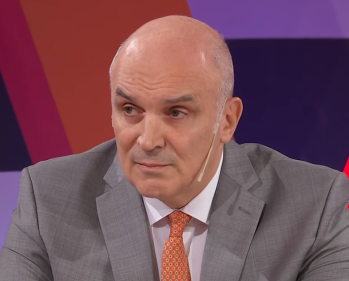
Espert as a presidential candidate on television

He is very critical of the economic policies of the second presidency of Carlos Menem and the governments of Fernando de la Rúa, Eduardo Duhalde, Néstor Kirchner, Cristina Fernández and Mauricio Macri.

In December 2018 he officially launched his presidential campaign for the 2019 Argentine general election.

Espert's proposals consist of lowering public spending, forming an agency similar to the US Drug Control Administration to combat drug trafficking, lowering taxes, decriminalizing personal marijuana use, decriminalizing abortion and reforming the education system through school vouchers.

He opposes industrial promotion regimes and believes that the right to strike has gone too far, harmed even the worker himself. Therefore, he seeks a labor, tax and state reform in general. He also showed himself in favor of privatizing inefficient state companies and the retirement system, to turn it into an individual capitalization system such as in Chile.

Espert signed the Madrid Charter, a document drafted by the conservative Spanish political party Vox that describes left-wing groups as enemies of Ibero-America involved in a "criminal project" that are "under the umbrella of the Cuban regime".

== Electoral history ==
=== Executive ===
Electoral history of José Luis Espert
Election	Office	List	Votes			Result	Ref.
Election	Office	List	Total	%	P.	Result	Ref.
2019	President of Argentina	Unite for Dignity and Liberty	394,207	1.47%	6th	Not elected	

=== Legislative ===
Electoral history of José Luis Espert
Election	Office	List	#	District	Votes			Result	Ref.
Election	Office	List	#	District	Total	%	P.	Result	Ref.
2021	National Deputy	Avanza Libertad	1	Buenos Aires Province	669,865	7.50%	3rd (Note: Presented on an electoral list. The data shown represents the share of the vote the entire party/alliance received in that constituency.)	Elected	

== Books ==
- Argentina Devoured (La Argentina Devorada) (2017)
- The Complicit Society (La Sociedad Cómplice) (2019)
- Invisible Chains (Cadenas Invisibles) (2021)
