= Primary elections in Argentina =

Argentina employs a system of blanket primary elections called PASO (which stands for Primarias Abiertas Simultáneas y Obligatorias, "Simultaneous and mandatory open primaries"). They were established in 2009 by the law 26,571.

In this system, all parties run primary elections in each general election. All parties must take part, including both the parties with internal factions and parties with a single candidate list. Citizens may vote for any candidate of any party, but may only cast a single vote.

Parties must also get 1.5% or higher of the vote to be allowed to run in the main election. Furthermore, each party should have at least a membership of 0,4% of the electoral roll of its respective district to continue operating. In 2011, 149 minor parties were either closed, or were not allowed to run in specific provinces where they did not meet the requirements. This was rejected by the small opposition parties, which charged that these reforms could stymy minor parties and the formation of new ones.

Private funding for political campaigns is not allowed. All parties are granted free airtime during the political campaign to advertisements of a fixed time duration.

Primary elections also serve as polls for the actual presidential elections, revealing the portion of votes that the candidates are expected to receive in them.

== Criticism ==
The PASO elections received several criticisms. Although they are mandatory for all parties, no parties used them for competitive primary elections since they were implemented. All primaries were either between a leading candidate and a small candidate with no real chances to win, or in most cases a single candidate with no rivals within the party. As a result, the candidates of the PASO elections were always the same as in the main elections.

As a consequence of the lack of use by the parties, the PASO were perceived as just a complex opinion poll for the real elections. Popular interest in PASO elections decreased, and as of 2023 attendance diminished almost 10% since implementation.

The lack of use and popular disinterest also raised concerns over the financial cost of holding such elections, as Argentina was in the middle of an economic crisis.

== Repeal ==
President Javier Milei, elected in 2023, proposed a bill to repeal the system. Negotiations with the Radical Civic Union and Republican Proposal changed it to a new bill that only skips the system for the 2025 Argentine legislative election. The bill was approved on February 21, 2025, with support from sectors of all parties.

The system is still used in several provinces to hold the elections for local politicians.
