= Norma Plá =

Argentine activist (1932–1996

- Born: Norma Beatriz Guimil; 7 September 1932; Villa Domínico, Buenos Aires, Argentina
- Died: 18 June 1996 (aged 63); Temperley, Buenos Aires, Argentina
- Occupation: Activist
- Spouse: Miguel Plá (died)
- Children: 4

Norma Beatriz Guimil de Plá (born Norma Beatriz Guimil; 7 September 1932 – 18 June 1996), better known as Norma Plá, was an Argentine activist who demanded an increase in pensions for retirees, and led various marches for the rights of older people in Argentina. In 1991, her movement of retirees began the practice of blocking the strategic Rivadavia Avenue in Buenos Aires every Wednesday, in front of the National Congress, becoming the first in Argentine history to systematically block streets as a form of protest, anticipating the piquetero movement.

== Biography ==
She was born and lived her entire life in a humble house. She was married and never got a formal job, when her husband died she was able to have a pension of 150 USD. This money was not enough to have a good standard of life and that motivated her first movements of manifestations.

As a retired woman, she started to be known for the claim of a minimum of 450 USD for all people on retirement to President Carlos Menem and Minister of Economy Domingo Cavallo. In one interview with Cavallo, he started crying in front of Plá remembering his parents as retired people. She also proposed that the affairs of the PAMI (the public health insurance agency for retired people) be conducted by its beneficiaries.

She started a campaign to improve the situation of older people in Argentina with manifestations in public places like squares. She was arrested by the police many times for his campaigns and for occupy public spaces. On one occasion, she gave to Mikhail Gorbachev a petition to require President Menem for improvements for older people.

She died of breast cancer in 1996 in her house in the neighbourhood of San José, Temperley. She is considered an icon of feminism in Argentina and an icon of the defense of older people.
