= Parroquia Nuestra Señora de la Piedad (Temperley) =

Church in Temperley, Argentina

Parroquia Nuestra Señora de la Piedad of Temperley
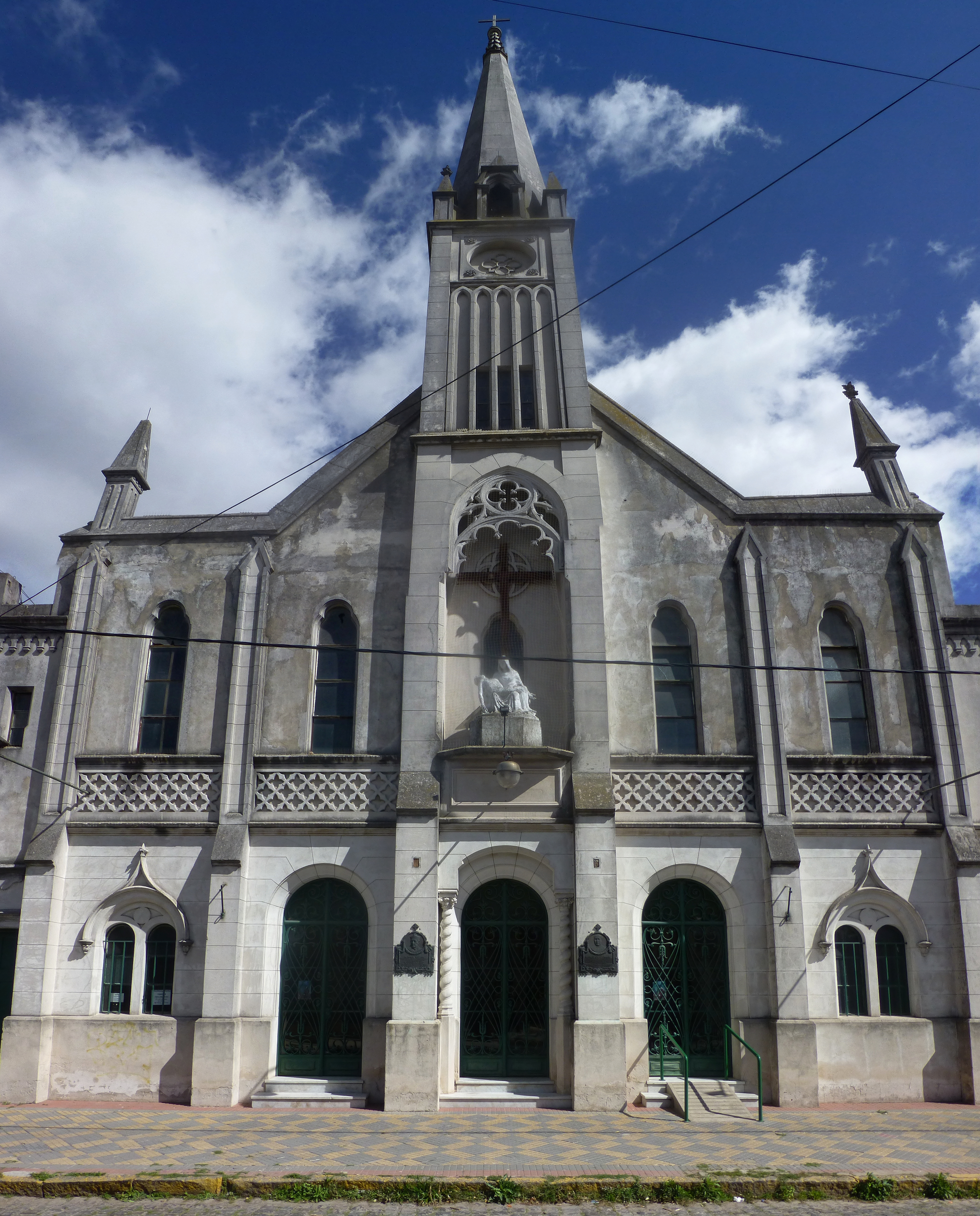
- facade of the parish

Religion
- District: Lomas de Zamora
- Province: Buenos Aires Province
- Rite: Catholic
- Patron: Virgen de la Piedad

Location
- Location: Espora 153, Temperley
- Country: Argentina
- Territory: Greater Buenos Aires

Architecture
- Architect: ?
- Style: eclectic
- Established: 1914
- Completed: 1931

Parroquia Nuestra Señora de la Piedad of Temperley is a Catholic church located in the city of Temperley, south part of Greater Buenos Aires, Argentina.

== History ==
The Parroquia Nuestra Señora de la Piedad was established on June 26, 1931, by initiative of the monsignor Francisco Alberti, being its first priest Félix Dutari Rodríguez. The parish is located in the "barrio inglés" of Temperley, a neighborhood of typical English architecture, who was populated towards the end of the 19th century by settlers of British origin, and also by Irish Catholics, whose descendants were faithful of the parish.
