= Sebastián Carruega =

Argentine professional footballer

Personal information
- Full name: Ignacio Sebastián Carruega
- Date of birth: 1 September 1996 (age 30)
- Place of birth: Villa Fiorito, Argentina
- Position: Midfielder

Team information
- Current team: Sacachispas

Youth career
- Almirante Brown

Senior career*
Years	Team	Apps	(Gls)
2015–2019	Almirante Brown	92	(5)
2019	Alebrijes de Oaxaca	0	(0)
2020–	Sacachispas	55	(3)
- * Club domestic league appearances and goals as of 17:42, 8 June 2022 (UTC)

Ignacio Sebastián Carruega (born 1 September 1996) is an Argentine professional footballer who plays as a midfielder for Sacachispas.

== Career ==
Almirante Brown gave Carruega his start in senior football. Osvaldo Rodríguez promoted the midfielder into the club's first-team during the 2015 season in Primera B Metropolitana, as he made five appearances off the substitutes bench; with his debut coming versus Deportivo Merlo in September. His first start came in a 1–1 draw away to San Telmo on 29 April 2016, which was followed by his first goal on 9 May against Atlanta. Carruega netted four times two seasons later in 2017–18. September 2019 saw Carruega head to Mexico to join Alebrijes de Oaxaca of Ascenso MX.

In March 2020, Carruega joined Sacachispas.

== Career statistics ==
As of 13 October 2019.

Appearances and goals by club, season and competition
Club	Season	League			Cup		League Cup		Continental		Other		Total	
Club	Season	Division	Apps	Goals	Apps	Goals	Apps	Goals	Apps	Goals	Apps	Goals	Apps	Goals
Almirante Brown	2015	Primera B Metropolitana	5	0	0	0	—		—		0	0	5	0
Almirante Brown	2016	Primera B Metropolitana	7	1	0	0	—		—		0	0	7	1
Almirante Brown	2016–17	Primera B Metropolitana	33	0	0	0	—		—		0	0	33	0
Almirante Brown	2017–18	Primera B Metropolitana	32	4	0	0	—		—		0	0	32	4
Almirante Brown	2018–19	Primera B Metropolitana	15	0	0	0	—		—		0	0	15	0
Almirante Brown	Total		92	5	0	0	—		—		0	0	92	5
Alebrijes de Oaxaca	2019–20	Ascenso MX	0	0	0	0	—		—		0	0	0	0
Career total			92	5	0	0	—		—		0	0	92	5
