= St. Andrew's Presbyterian Church, Temperley =

Church in Greater Buenos Aires, Argentina

St. Andrew's Presbyterian Church
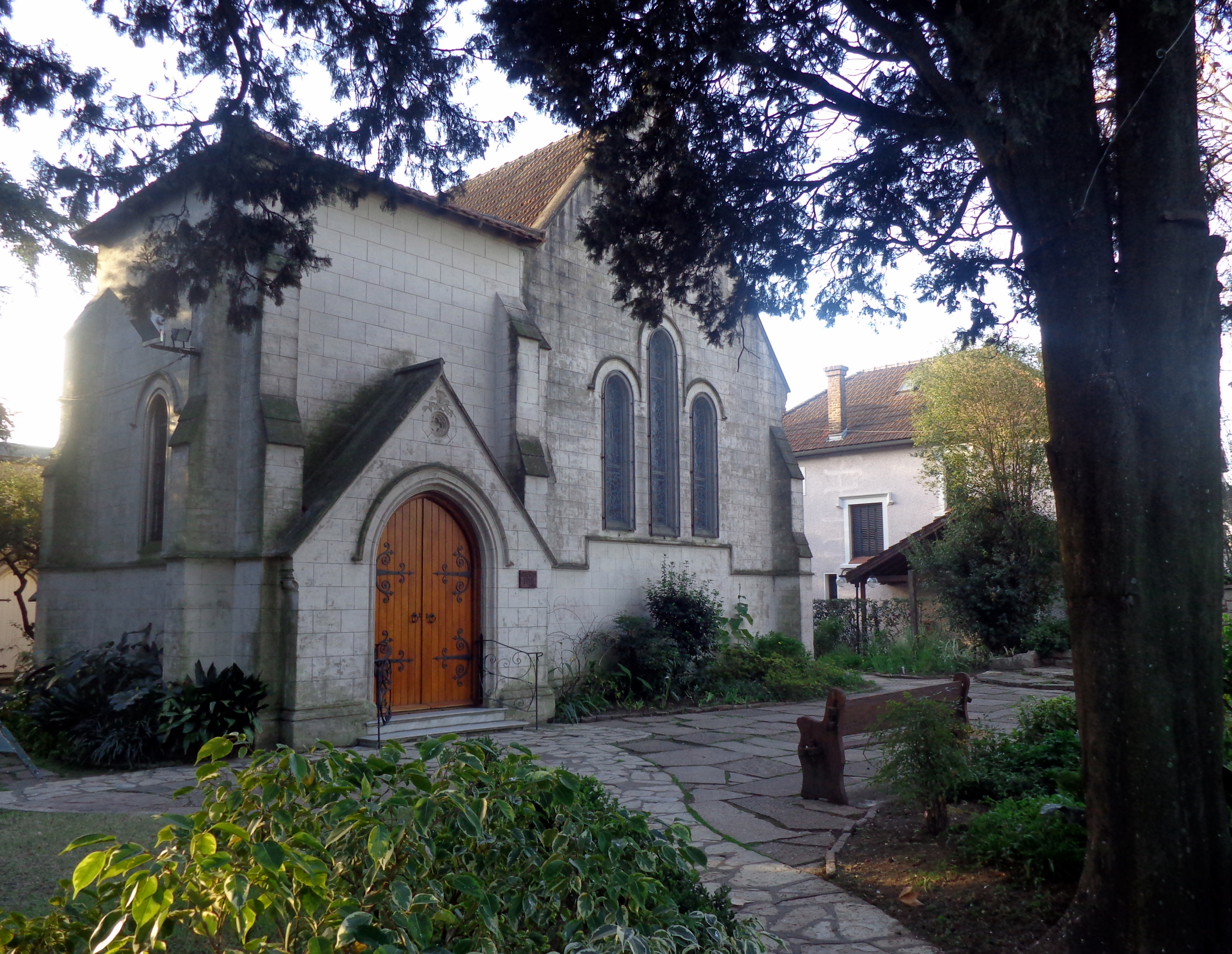
- facade of the church

Religion
- Affiliation: Presbyterian
- District: Lomas de Zamora
- Province: Buenos Aires Province
- Rite: Protestant
- Patron: Andrew the Apostle

Location
- Location: corner José María Paz and Tomás Espora, Temperley
- Country: Argentina
- Interactive map of St. Andrew's Presbyterian Church
- Coordinates: 34°46′25″S 58°24′01″W

Architecture
- Architects: Walter Bassett Smith; Bertie Hawkins Collcutt
- Style: neo-Gothic
- Established: March 2, 1913

St. Andrew's Presbyterian Church of Temperley (Spanish: Iglesia Presbiteriana San Andrés de Temperley) is a temple of Presbyterian religion, located in the "barrio inglés" of Temperley, southern part of the Greater Buenos Aires.

== History ==
Established in 1913, this church was originally conceived to house the large number of British residents of the area, mostly Protestant. It was the work of the English architects, Walter Bassett Smith and Bertie Hawkins Collcutt, who began construction in 1911.

St. Andrew's Presbyterian Church of Temperley was declared as historical heritage of Argentina in 2018.
