= Daniela Vilar =

Argentine politician

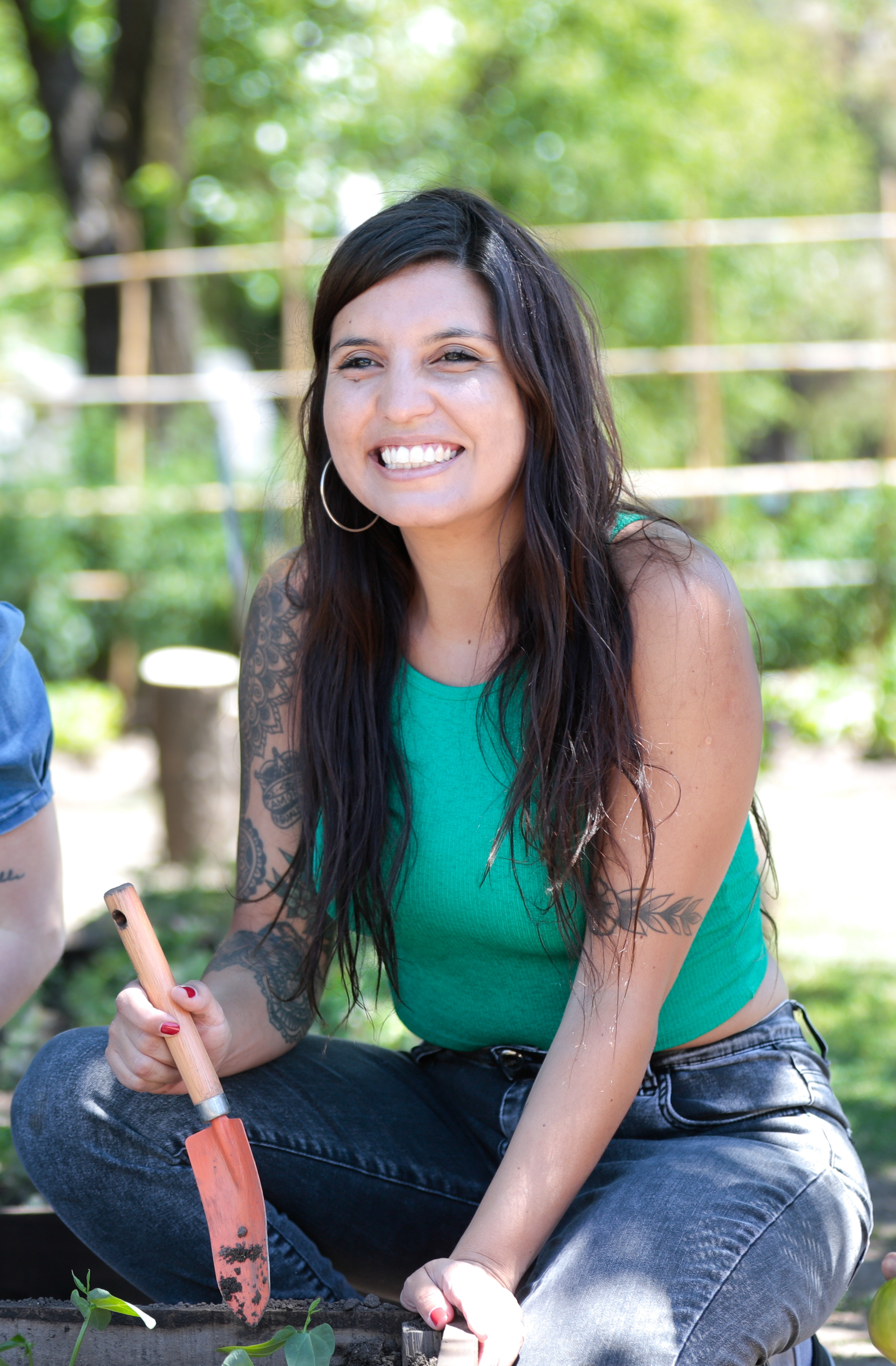

Minister of the Environment of Buenos Aires Province
- Incumbent
- Assumed office 10 December 2021
- Governor: Axel Kicillof
- Preceded by: New post

National Deputy
- In office 10 December 2019 – 9 December 2021
- Constituency: Buenos Aires

Personal details
- Born: 2 January 1984 (age 42) Lomas de Zamora, Argentina
- Party: Justicialist Party
- Other political affiliations: Unidad Ciudadana (2017–2019); Frente de Todos (2019–present)

Daniela Marina Vilar (born 2 January 1984) is an Argentine politician and retired handball player, currently serving as Minister of the Environment of Buenos Aires Province, in the administration of Governor Axel Kicillof. A member of the Justicialist Party and La Cámpora, she previously served as a National Deputy elected in Buenos Aires Province in 2019 for the Frente de Todos. Before that, she was a member of the Lomas de Zamora City Council.

== Early life and career ==
Vilar was born on 2 January 1984 in Lomas de Zamora, in the Greater Buenos Aires conurbation. She grew up in a working-class family, and became interested in sports from an early age. She played handball as part of Club Cideco, in the position of goalkeeper. Vilar was part of the national beach handball team in the 2014 Pan American Beach Handball Championship and the 2014 World Championships.

Vilar studied Political Science at the University of Buenos Aires, and has a master's degree in Public Policy from the University of San Andrés. She is married to Federico Otermín, a fellow politician and the current mayor of Lomas de Zamora.

== Political career ==
Vilar began her political activism in La Cámpora, one of the youth wings of the Front for Victory. In 2015, she was elected to the City Council of Lomas de Zamora on the Front for Victory ticket. She ran for a seat in the Argentine Chamber of Deputies in the 2019 legislative election; she was the 12th candidate in the Frente de Todos list in Buenos Aires Province. The list received 51.64% of the vote, and Vilar was elected.

As a national deputy, Vilar formed part of the parliamentary commissions on the Modernization of Parliamentary Procedure (which she presides), Natural Resources and Environmental Conservation, Cooperative Affairs, Municipal Affairs, Sports, General Legislation, Petitions, Powers and Norms, and Foreign Affairs. She was a supporter of the 2020 Voluntary Interruption of Pregnancy bill, which legalized abortion in Argentina.

She has also introduced legislation on gender affairs and women's rights and environmental protection, such as the National Plan for Sustainable Menstrual Administration.

On 9 December 2021, Buenos Aires governor Axel Kicillof appointed her as the province's new Minister of the Environment (a new portfolio) due to her active participation in environmental policy. Her vacancy in the Chamber of Deputies was filled by Natalia Zaracho.
