= San José, Buenos Aires =

San José
- Location in Greater Buenos Aires
- Coordinates: 34°45′S 58°23′W
- Country: Argentina
- Province: Buenos Aires
- Partido: Lomas de Zamora
- Elevation: 16 m (52 ft)

Population (2001 census [INDEC])
  - Total: 44,437
- CPA Base: B 1498
- Area code: +54 11

San José is a localidad (district) located in the south of Lomas de Zamora Partido in Buenos Aires Province. It forms part of the Greater Buenos Aires conurbation.

The neighborhood, named after Saint Joseph, traces its origins to 1948, when a region of semi-rural terrain between Temperley and Quilmes was developed.
