= Natalia Zaracho =

Argentine politician (born 1989)

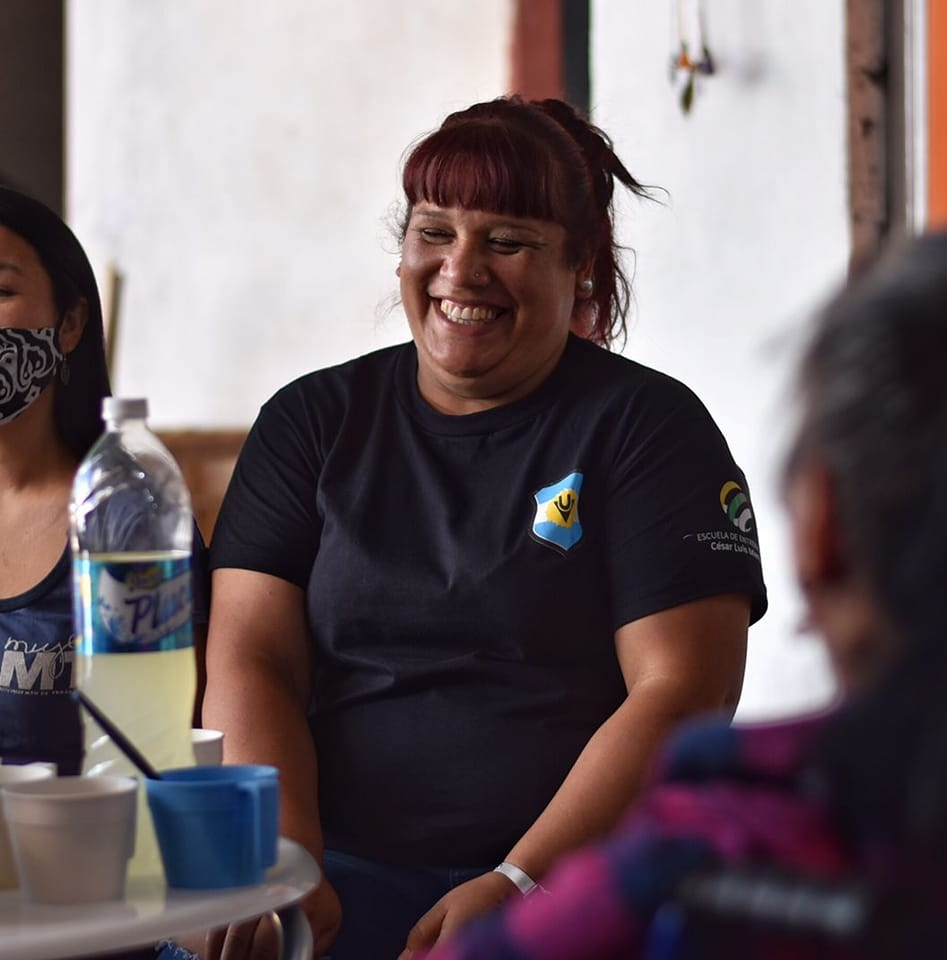

National Deputy
- Incumbent
- Assumed office 16 December 2021
- Constituency: Buenos Aires

Personal details
- Born: Natalia Beatriz Zaracho; 5 July 1989 (age 37) Villa Fiorito, Argentina
- Party: Patria Grande Front
- Other political affiliations: Frente de Todos (2019–2023); Union for the Homeland (2023–present)
- Children: 2
- Profession: Politician Activist Scrap collector (formerly)

Natalia Beatriz Zaracho (born 5 July 1989) is an Argentine scrap collector, activist and politician, currently serving as a National Deputy of the Argentine Congress. She is a member of the Patria Grande Front.

== Early life and career ==
Zaracho was born on 5 July 1989. She grew up in Villa Fiorito, a working-class neighbourhood in the Greater Buenos Aires conurbation. She lives with her two sons.

In the midst of the 1998–2002 Argentine great depression, Zaracho began working as a cartonera, a street scrap collector. When she was 25, she joined the Movimiento de Trabajadores Excluidos ("Rejected Workers' Movement", MTE), which sought to group and fight for the demands of informal sector workers. Led by Juan Grabois, the MTE would later become part of the Patria Grande Front.

== Political career ==
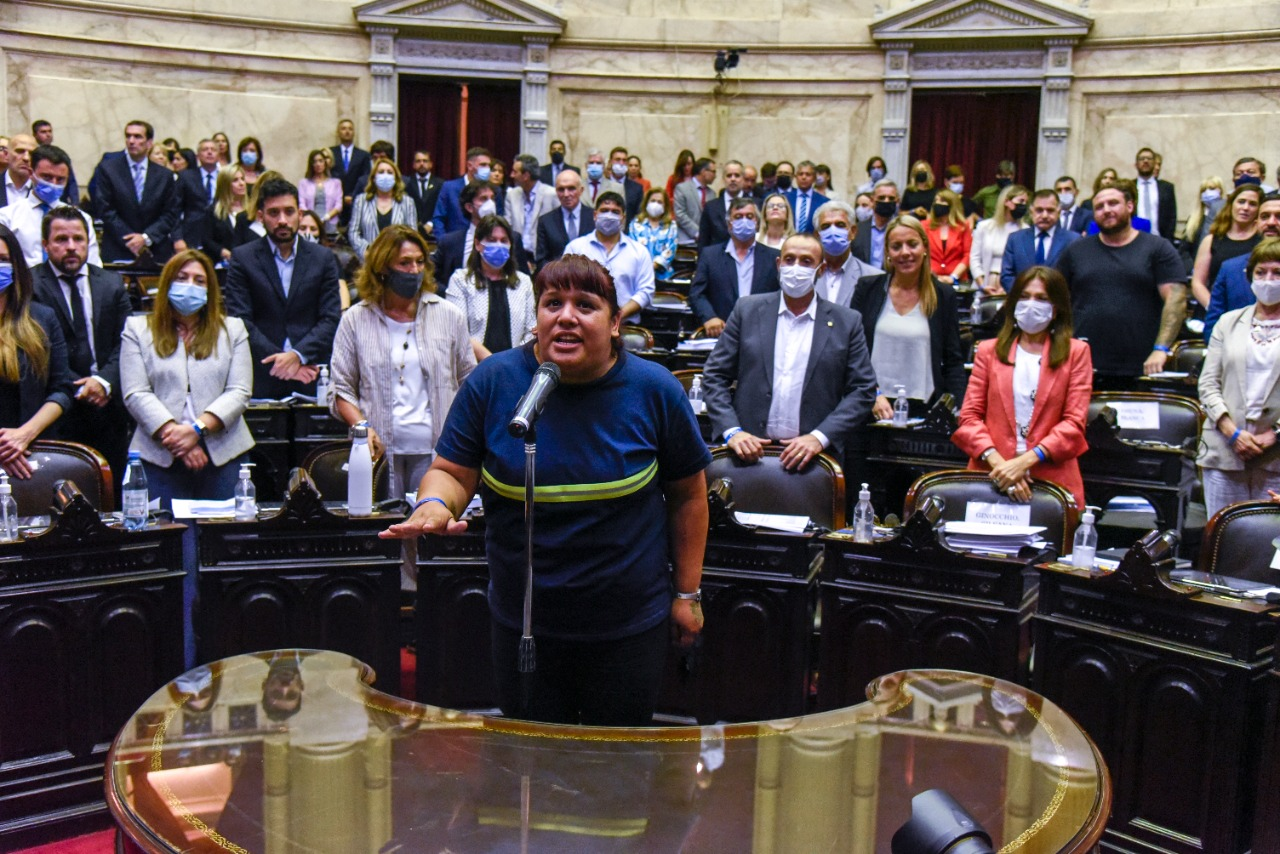
Zaracho is sworn in as deputy on 16 December 2021.

Zaracho's political career began as a legislative aide for Itai Hagman. She has stated that she was initially reluctant to run for office, as she considered traditional politics to be a "very hostile place". In the 2019 general election, with the Patria Grande Front as part of the broader Frente de Todos (FDT) coalition, Zaracho ran for a seat in the Argentine Chamber of Deputies as the 26th candidate in the Frente de Todos list in Buenos Aires Province. The list received 52.64% of the vote, not nearly enough for Zaracho to make it past the D'Hondt cut.

In 2021, FDT deputy Daniela Vilar resigned from her seat in order to take office as a government minister in Buenos Aires Province. Zaracho was called in to fill in Vilar's vacancy for the remainder of the 2019–2023 term. She took office as deputy on 16 December 2021. Nationwide media highlighted her as "the first cartonera congresswoman". During her swearing-in ceremony, she swore her oath "for the patria cartonera and for the struggle of the poor of our country", while wearing her scrap collector uniform.

As deputy, Zaracho has stated she wants to push for the implementation of a universal basic income in Argentina, citing the shortcomings of the universal allocation per child (AUH) and other similar social assistance programmes introduced during the progressive governments of Néstor Kirchner and Cristina Fernández de Kirchner.

In February 2023, she was briefly detained and held by local police in Lanús, Buenos Aires after an altercation with an on duty police squad. According to Zaracho, she saw two policemen beating a youth and she stepped in to make them stop. She was then detained and held in a police car, before being relocated to a nearby police station. Despite stating she is a sitting congresswoman (therefore counting with parliamentary immunity), she was held in prison for three hours. The incident elicited condemnation from the president of the Chamber of Deputies, Cecilia Moreau, who demanded for her release upon learning of the situation. Néstor Grindetti, mayor of Lanús, and a member of the opposition party, alleged that Zaracho tried to directly assault and aggravate police officers at the scene who were apprehending a driver with a stolen motorcycle.

== Electoral history ==
Electoral history of Natalia Zaracho
Election	Office	List	#	District	Votes			Result	Ref.
Election	Office	List	#	District	Total	%	P.	Result	Ref.
2019	National Deputy	Frente de Todos	26	Buenos Aires Province	5,113,359	52.64%	1st (Note: Presented on an electoral list. The data shown represents the share of the vote the entire party/alliance received in that constituency.)	Not elected (Note: Assumed office on 16 December 2021 following the resignation of Daniela Vilar.)	
2023	National Deputy	Union for the Homeland	8	Buenos Aires Province	4,094,665	43.71%	1st	Elected	
