= George Temperley =

George Alison Temperley
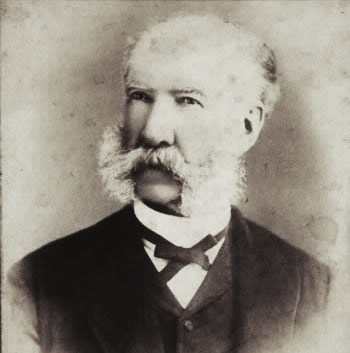

Personal details
- Born: October 10, 1823 Newcastle upon Tyne, United Kingdom
- Died: June 25, 1900 (aged 76) Buenos Aires, Argentina
- Resting place: La Recoleta Cemetery
- Occupation: Landowner; Trader
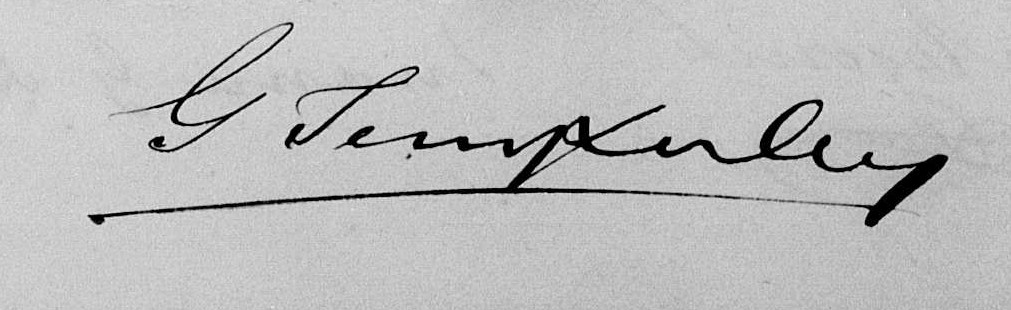
- Signature

George Temperley (1823–1900) was an English landowner, founder of the Argentine city Temperley.

== Biography ==
George Temperley was born in Newcastle, England, son of John Askew Temperley and Margaret Allison, belonging to a family of Durham. He had emigrated to Argentina during the reign of Queen Victoria. Permanently established in the city of Buenos Aires, he married Charlotte Knight, daughter of George Knight and Eleonor Proctor, natives of London. His marriage was performed under the Anglican rite, and was celebrated on February 17, 1846, the Cathedral of St. John the Baptist His second wife was Carolyn Knight, a noble lady relative of his first spouse. The wedding was held in 1851 by the Irish priest Anthony Dominic Fahy in the Catholic Church San Pedro Telmo.

In his early years in Argentina, Temperley was dedicated to the commerce, he had been the owner of a blacksmithing business, considered one of the most important establishments of Buenos Aires. In 1866 George Temperley, together with his compatriot Richard Blake Newton were co-founders of THE Sociedad Rural Argentina. Time later in 1872, he helped build the Church Holy Trinity, an Anglican church built for British families who were established in the area of Lomas de Zamora from around 1860.

On January 1, 1893, George Temperley founded Temperley, a locality belonging to the commune of Lomas de Zamora in the southern part of Greater Buenos Aires.
