= Villa Centenario =

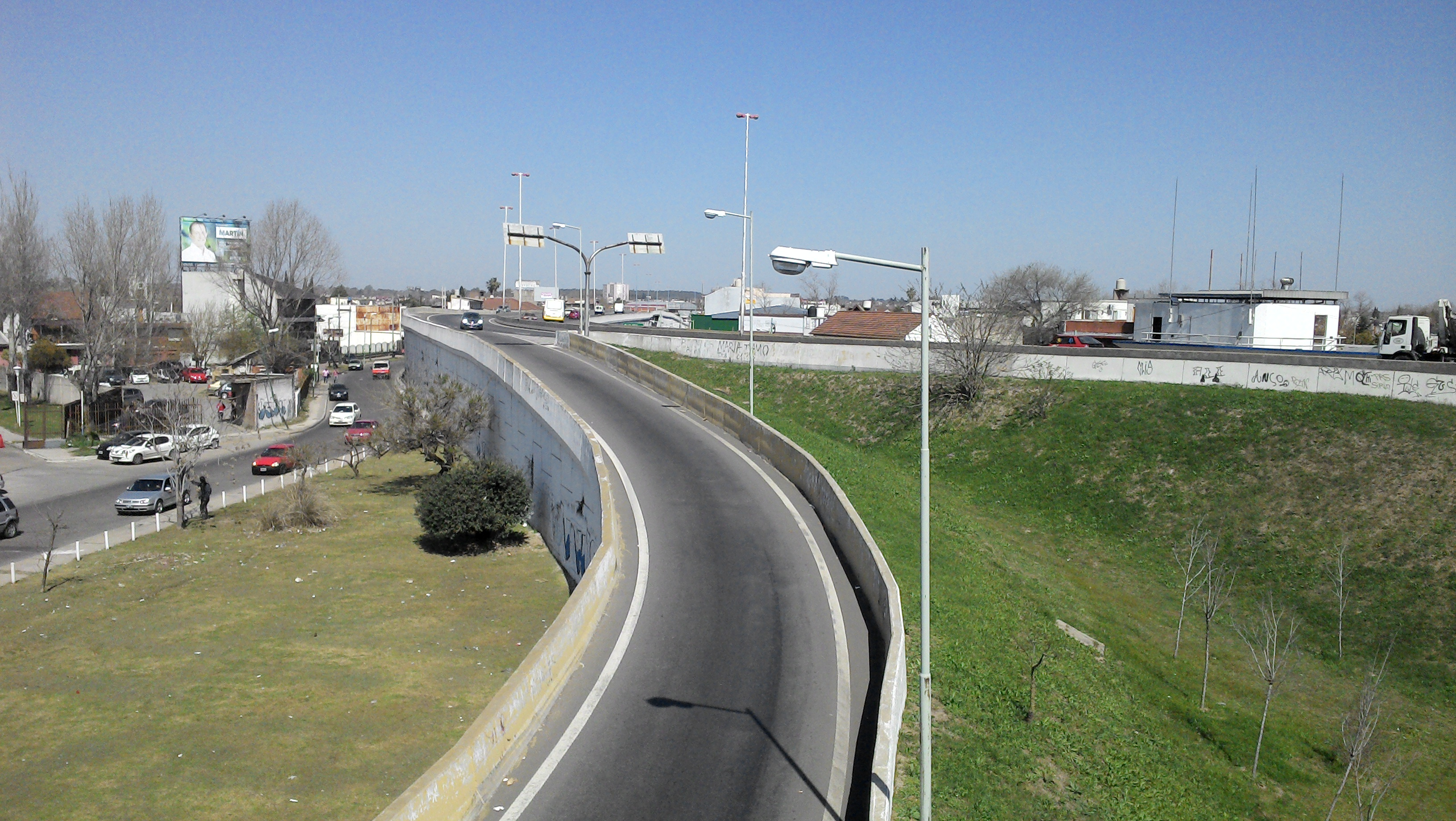
- View of Presidente Perón Freeway in Villa Centenario.

- Location in Greater Buenos Aires
- Coordinates: 34°46′S 58°23′W
- Country: Argentina
- Province: Buenos Aires
- Partido: Lomas de Zamora
- Elevation: 20 m (66 ft)

Population (2001 census [INDEC])
  - Total: 49,737
  - Density: 8,741.12/km^{2} (22,639.4/sq mi)
- CPA Base: B 2700
- Area code: +54 11

Villa Centenario is a district of Lomas de Zamora Partido in Buenos Aires Province, Argentina. It forms part of the Greater Buenos Aires urban conurbation.
