= Federico Otermín =

Argentine lawyer and politician

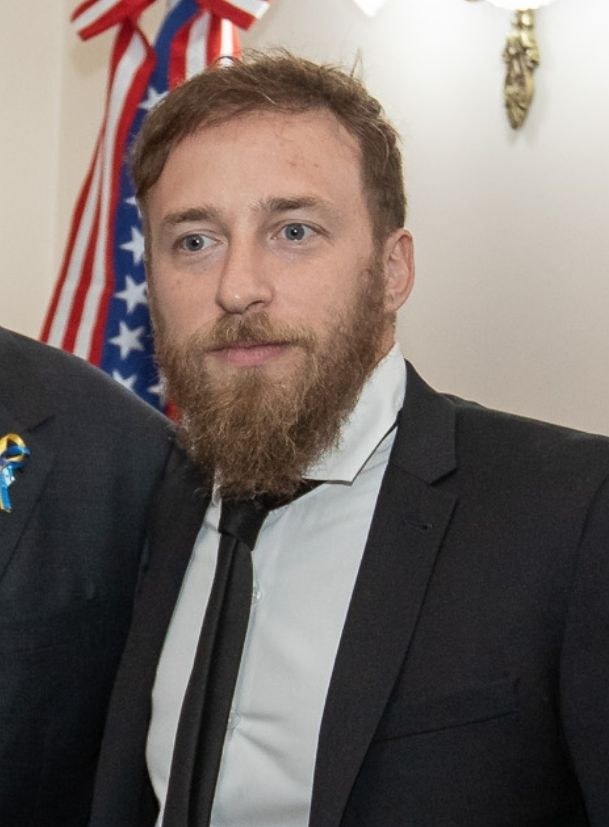

Intendant of Lomas de Zamora
- Incumbent
- Assumed office 10 December 2023
- Preceded by: Marina Lesci

President of the Buenos Aires Province Chamber of Deputies
- In office 10 December 2019 – 6 December 2023
- Preceded by: Marisol Merquel
- Succeeded by: Enrique Alejandro Dichiara

Provincial Deputy of Buenos Aires
- In office 10 December 2017 – 10 December 2023
- Constituency: Third Electoral Section

Personal details
- Born: 1 December 1984 (age 41) Banfield, Argentina
- Party: Justicialist Party
- Other political affiliations: Front for Victory (2013–2017); Frente de Todos (2019–2023); Union for the Homeland (2023–present)
- Spouse: Daniela Vilar

Jorge Federico Otermín (born 1 December 1984) is an Argentine politician. Since 2023, he has been a intendente (mayor) of Lomas de Zamora, a municipality in the Greater Buenos Aires conurbation. He is a member of the Justicialist Party.

He previously served as a member of the Buenos Aires Province Chamber of Deputies from 2017 to 2023, and served as the chamber's president from 2019 to 2023.

== Early life and career ==
Otermín was born on 1 December 1984 in Balfield, a suburb in the Lomas de Zamora Partido within the Greater Buenos Aires metro area. His father was a cardiologist and his mother a schoolteacher. Otermín studied journalism and worked as a writer at Clarín and as a TV producer for Telefe. In 2009 he started working in the communications area of the Lomas de Zamora mayor's office under intendente Martín Insaurralde.

== Political career ==
From 2013 to 2017 he was Secretary of Culture and Communication in the municipality of Lomas de Zamora. Otermín was elected to the Buenos Aires Province Chamber of Deputies at the 2017 provincial elections; he ran in the Unidad Ciudadana list in the Third Electoral Section.

Following the 2019 provincial election, which saw Axel Kicillof elected governor and the peronist Frente de Todos alliance win a majority in the Chamber of Deputies, Otermín was elected by the new legislature to serve as President of the Chamber. At age 34 he became the youngest deputy to preside the provincial Chamber.

He was re-elected to the Chamber of Deputies in the 2021 election.

In 2023 he was elected as intendente (mayor) of Lomas de Zamora as part of the Union for the Homeland coalition, attaining over 49% of the vote and succeeding Marina Lesci.

== Personal life ==
He is married to fellow politician Daniela Vilar, with whom he has a daughter.

== Electoral history ==
=== Executive ===
Electoral history of Federico Otermín
Election	Office	List	Votes			Result	Ref.
Election	Office	List	Total	%	P.	Result	Ref.
2023	Mayor of Lomas de Zamora	Union for the Homeland	197,942	49.82%	1st	Elected	

=== Legislative ===
Electoral history of Federico Otermín
Election	Office	List	#	District	Votes			Result	Ref.
Election	Office	List	#	District	Total	%	P.	Result	Ref.
2017	Provincial Deputy	Unidad Ciudadana	4	Third Electoral Section	1,487,803	44.1%	1st (Note: Presented on an electoral list. The data shown represents the share of the vote the entire party/alliance received in that constituency.)	Elected	
2021	Provincial Deputy	Frente de Todos	5	Third Electoral Section	1,481,960	45.67%	1st	Elected	

Political offices
Preceded by Marisol Merquel	President of the Buenos Aires Province Chamber of Deputies; 2019–2023	Succeeded by Enrique Alejandro Dichiara
Preceded by Marina Lesci	Mayor of Lomas de Zamora; 2023–present	Incumbent
