= Villa Fiorito =

- City
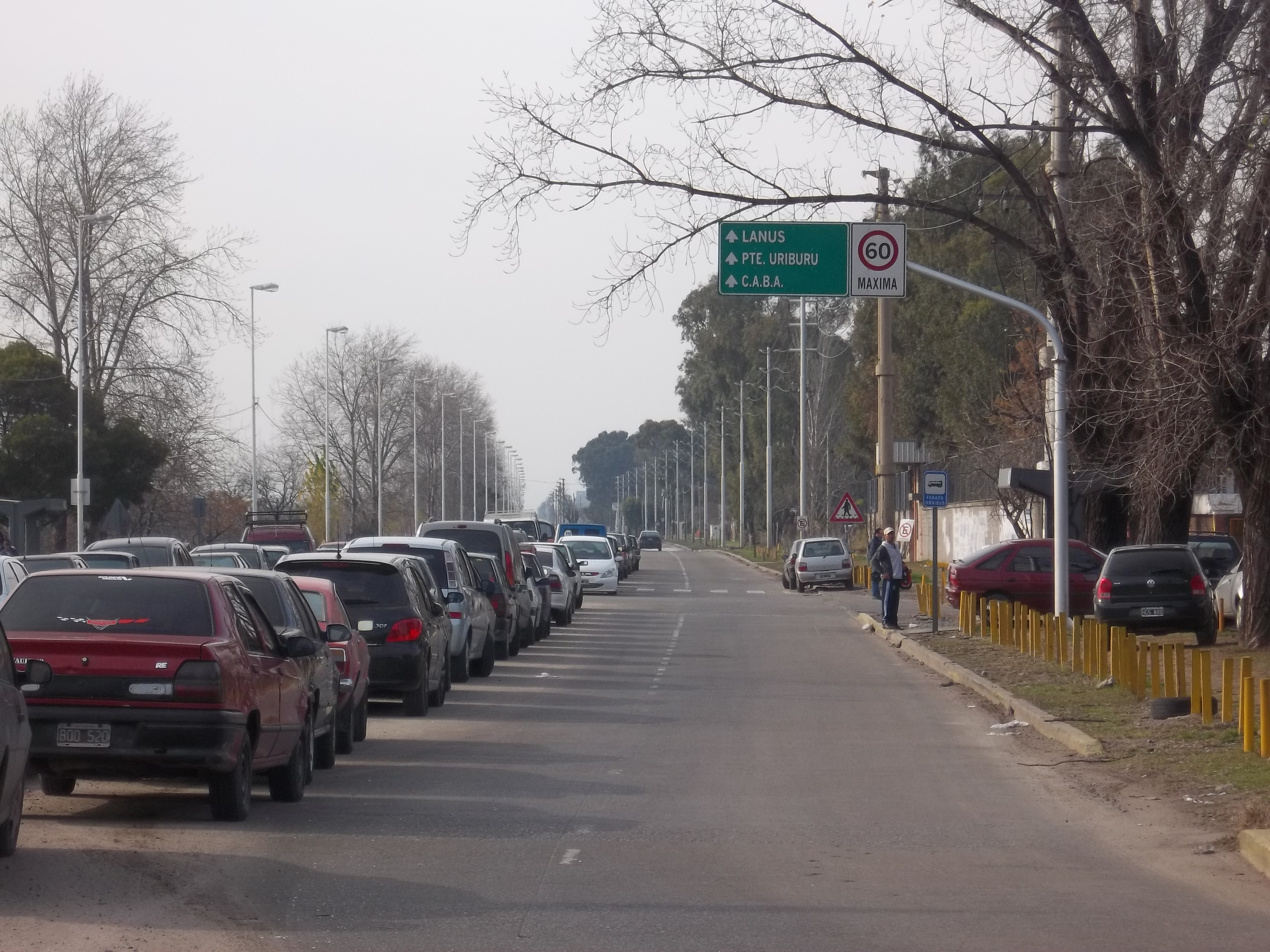
- Ribera Sur Road in Villa Fiorito.
- Interactive map of Villa Fiorito
- Location in Greater Buenos Aires
- Coordinates: 34°42′S 58°27′W
- Country: Argentina
- Province: Buenos Aires
- Partido: Lomas de Zamora
- Elevation: 1 m (3.3 ft)

Population (2001 census [INDEC])
  - Total: 42,904
- CPA Base: B 1832
- Area code: +54 11

Villa Fiorito is a city in the Lomas de Zamora Partido of Buenos Aires Province, to the south of central Buenos Aires, Argentina. It forms part of the Greater Buenos Aires urban conurbation. Many Italian and Spanish descendants live there. In recent decades people from other provinces have come to live near central Buenos Aires, creating new slums in the city. Diego Maradona, considered one of the greatest footballers of all time, was raised in Villa Fiorito.

== Notable residents ==
- Claudio García, footballer
- Diego Maradona, footballer
- Facundo Medina, footballer
- Héctor Yazalde, footballer
- Natalia Zaracho, cartonera and politician
