= Lomas de Zamora Partido =

Lomas de Zamora Partido de Lomas de Zamora
- Partido
- Emblem

- location of Lomas de Zamora Partido in Greater Buenos Aires
- Coordinates: 34°46′S 58°23′W
- Country: Argentina
- Province: Buenos Aires
- Established: July 10, 1861
- Founder: Esteban Adrogué
- Seat: Lomas de Zamora

Government
  - Intendant: Federico Otermín (UxP)

Area
  - Total: 89 km^{2} (34 sq mi)

Population
  - Total: 613,192
  - Density: 6,900/km^{2} (18,000/sq mi)
- Demonym: lomense
- Postal Code: B1832
- IFAM: BUE074
- Area Code: 011
- Patron saint: Nuestra Señora de la Paz
- Website: lomasdezamora.gov.ar

Lomas de Zamora is a partido (district) of Buenos Aires Province, Argentina, and part of the Greater Buenos Aires urban agglomeration.

It has an area of 89 km^{2} (34 sq mi) and a population of 613,192 (2001 census [INDEC]), the second-most populous partido in the Greater Buenos Aires agglomeration. The local government's seat is at the city of Lomas de Zamora.

== Districts ==
- Banfield
- Llavallol
- Lomas de Zamora (capital)
- Temperley
- San José
- Turdera
- Villa Centenario
- Villa Fiorito (formerly in Lanús Partido)
