= Esteban Adrogué =

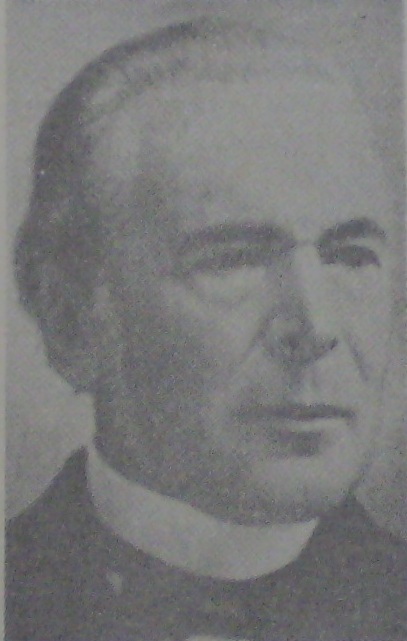
Esteban Adrogué

Esteban Adrogué (September 2, 1815 – 1903) was an Argentine citizen born in Buenos Aires and founder of the city of Adrogué in the southern part of Greater Buenos Aires, Argentina.

== Early life ==
Son of Don José Ramón Adrogué and Doña Petrona Portela. His father, originally from Valencia, Spain, was a merchant, activity that he would later develop, to reach a solid economical position. He dedicated his life to commerce and saved a good deal of money that would allow him to become a pioneer in the urbanization of the southern part of Greater Buenos Aires, Argentina.

His enterprising and progressive spirit took him to worry about public works and participated in many of them. During his lifetime, he participated in the construction on the Alsina bridge, located over the Matanza River, the electricity and gas-based lighting in Buenos Aires and the pavement on the streets.

== Founder ==
By the middle of the 19th century, he was one of the founders of the city of Lomas de Zamora, contributing also to the creation of the partido bearing the same name. In the 1870s he started the project that would make him famous, the foundation of the city of Adrogué, originally called Almirante Brown, and the foundation of the Almirante Brown Partido. It was built as a fashionable area, safe from yellow fever.

Esteban Adrogué wanted the town that would bear his name to stand out from the others, so it possesses an original layout and numerous lush trees on the sidewalks, and was the summer resort of preference of the porteños aristocracy between 1872 and 1920. He was the owner of the Las Delicias hotel, formerly his own private residence, which accommodated several distinguished figures like Jorge Luis Borges, Domingo Faustino Sarmiento, Adolfo Bioy Casares, Silvina Ocampo, Victoria Ocampo and Carlos Pellegrini, among others.

On April 12, 1837, he married Isidora Amestoy Arnais y Pinazo.

== Death and legacy ==
Esteban Adrogué died in 1903. A monument in his honor is established in the square baring his name, located in the center of the city of Adrogué. His remains rest in the La Recoleta Cemetery, in Buenos Aires.
