= Temperley, Argentina =

Temperley
- City
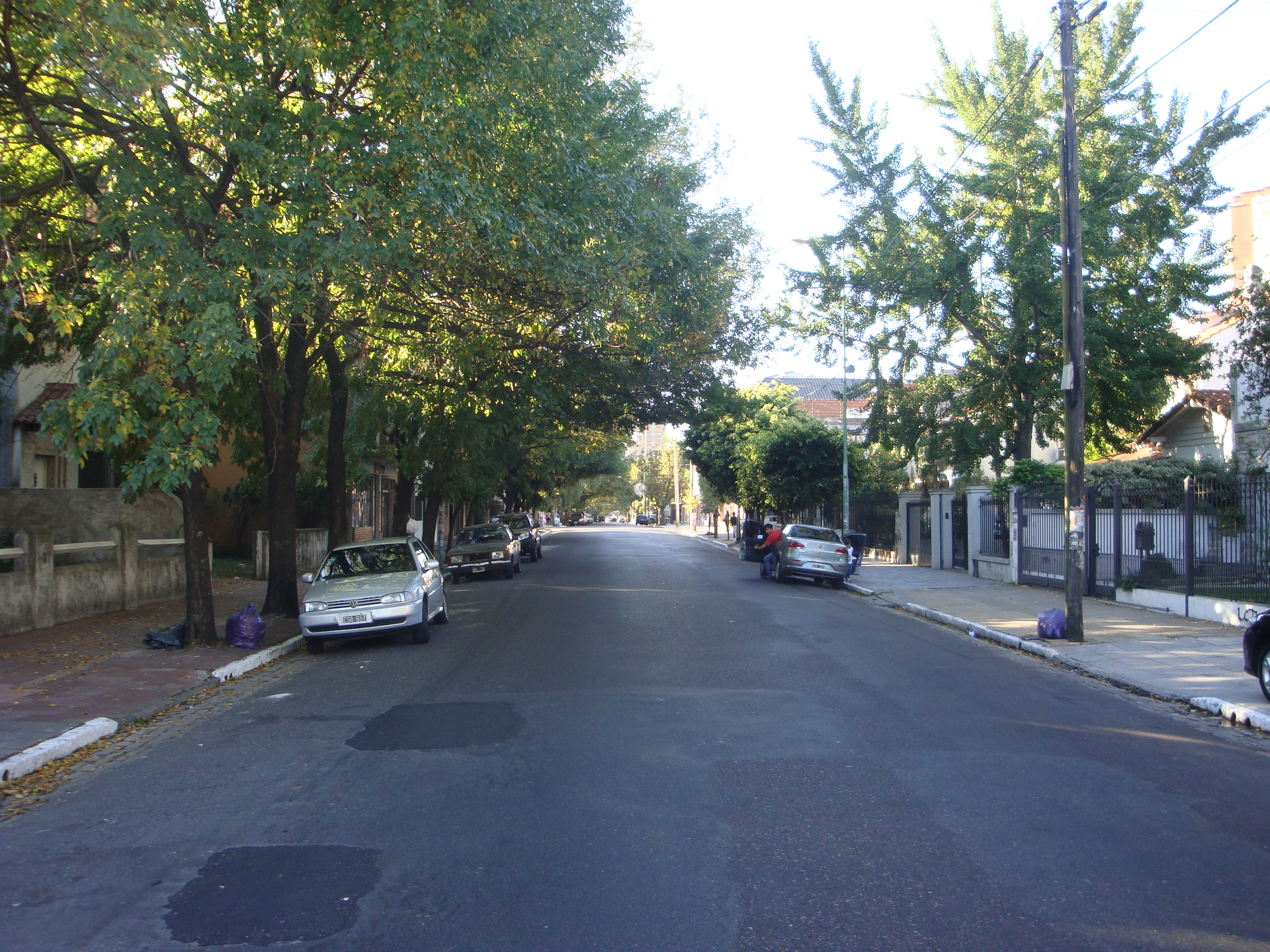
- Meeks Avenue, Temperley.

- Location in Greater Buenos Aires
- Coordinates: 34°46′S 58°23′W
- Country: Argentina
- Province: Buenos Aires
- Partido: Lomas de Zamora
- Founded: 1870
- Elevation: 20 m (66 ft)

Population (2001 census [INDEC])
  - Total: 111,160
  - Density: 6,991/km^{2} (18,110/sq mi)
- CPA Base: B 1834
- Area code: +54 11

Temperley is a district in Greater Buenos Aires, Argentina, located in the south of Lomas de Zamora Partido.

== History ==
In 1854 the industrial and textile merchant George Temperley (born in 1823 in Newcastle upon Tyne, England) bought from the Marenco brothers 51 hectares between the present streets of Dorrego, Almirante Brown, Eva Perón and Lavalle, and built a country house there. On October 16, 1870, Temperley set aside land from his extensive property for the establishment of a community, and participated in the building of both the original Lomas de Zamora City Hall and the Temperley railway station, one of the largest in Greater Buenos Aires.

In 1965 the town of Temperley was granted ciudad status by the Provincial Legislature.

== Origin of the name ==
It was George Temperley who helped to create Lomas de Zamora Partido and who made possible the foundation of the town of Temperley.

== Important places ==
Founded on November 1, 1912, Club Atlético Temperley is the football club for the Cities of Temperley and Turdera.

== Gallery ==
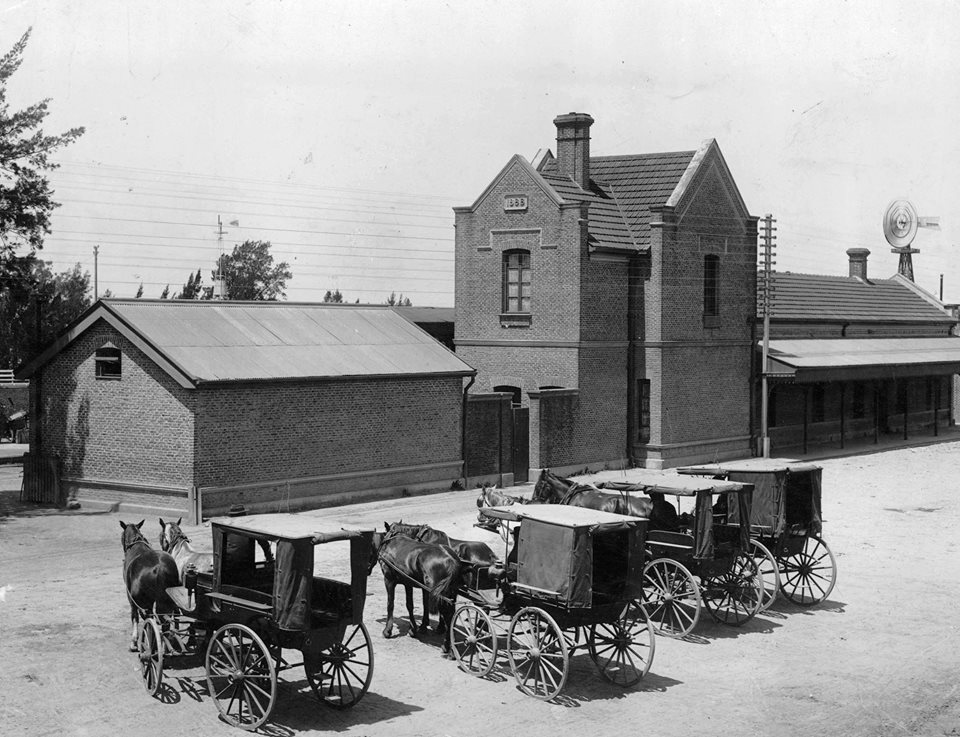
Temperley Station, c.1905

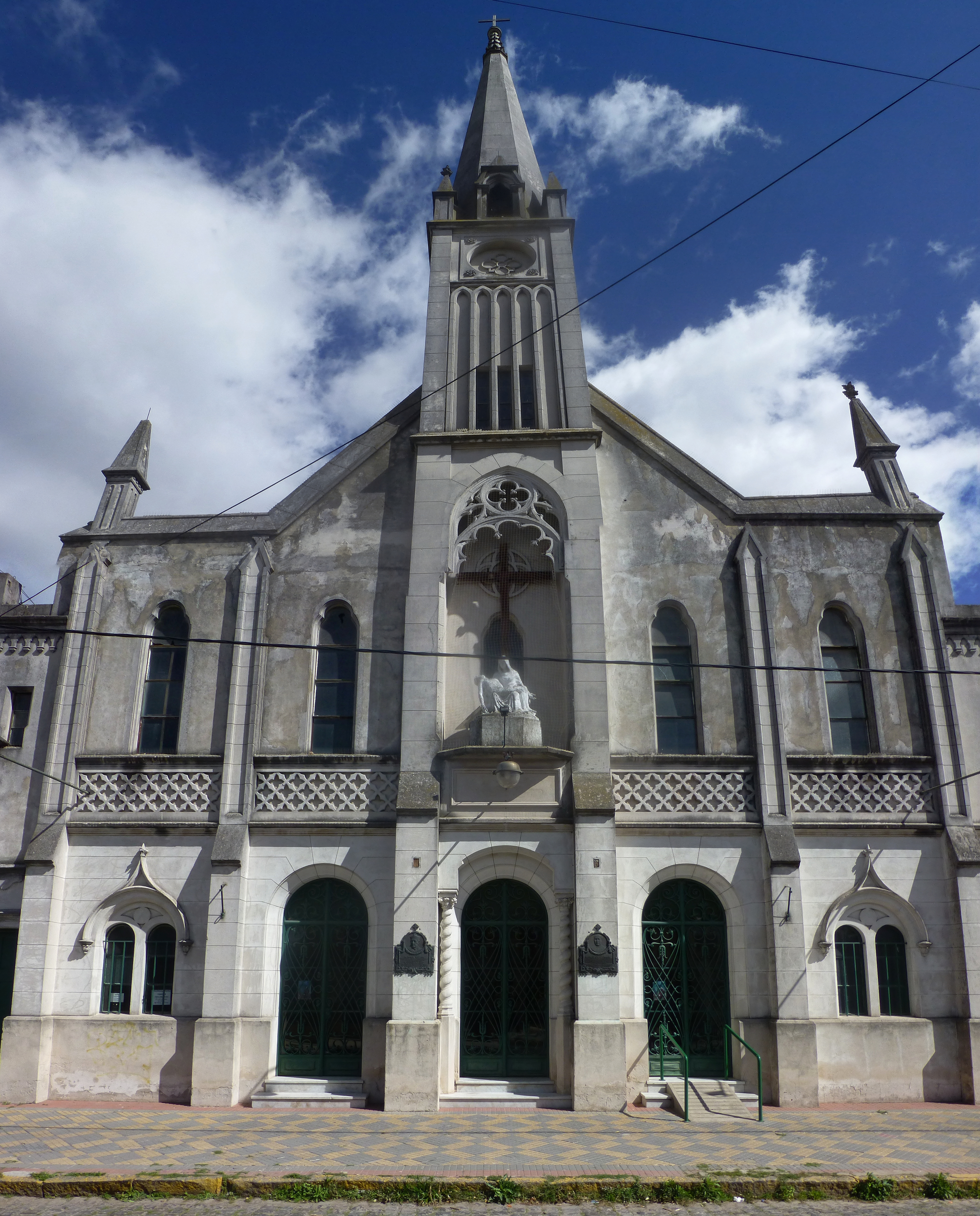
Parish Our Lady of Mercy of Temperley

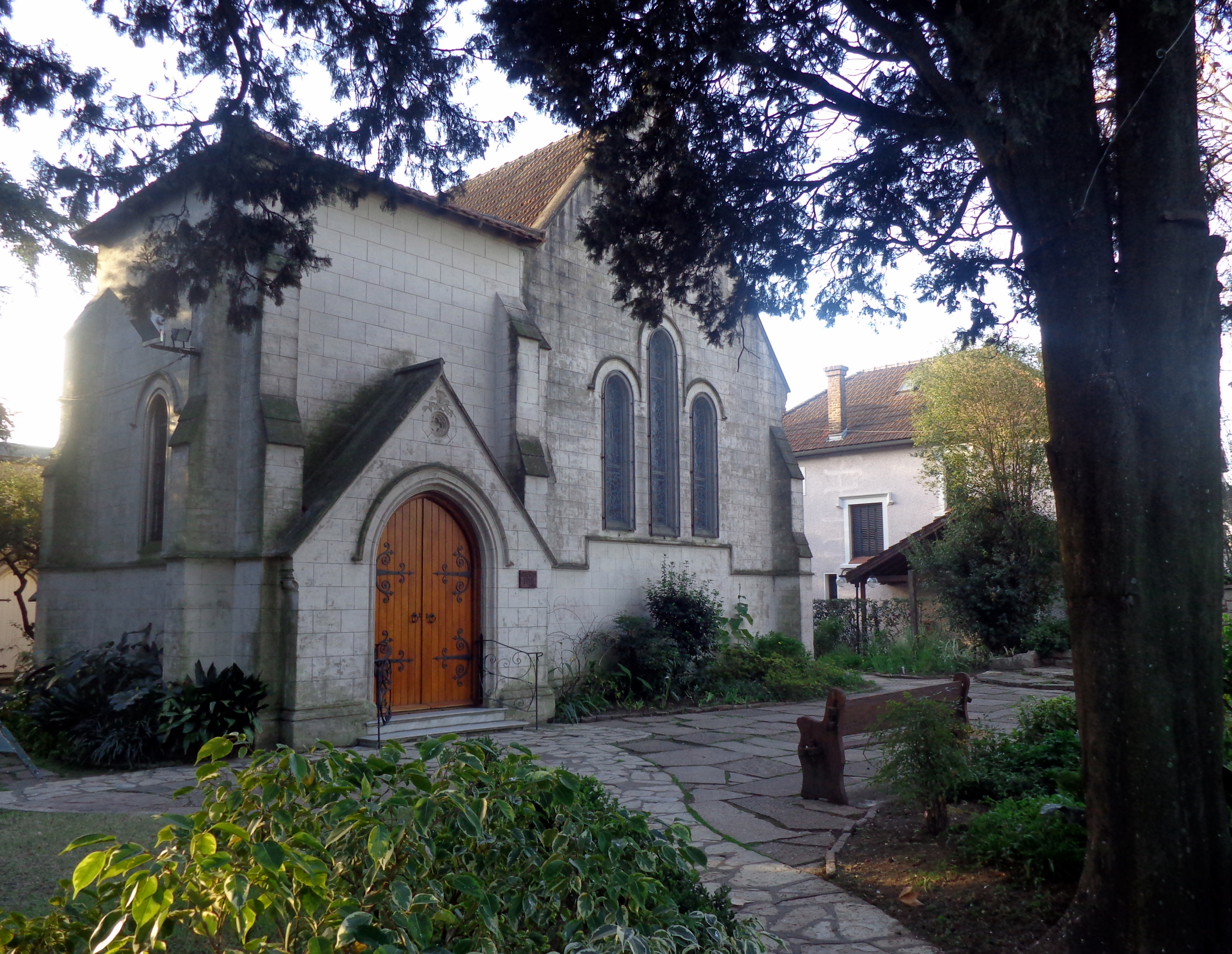
St. Andrew´s Presbyterian Church

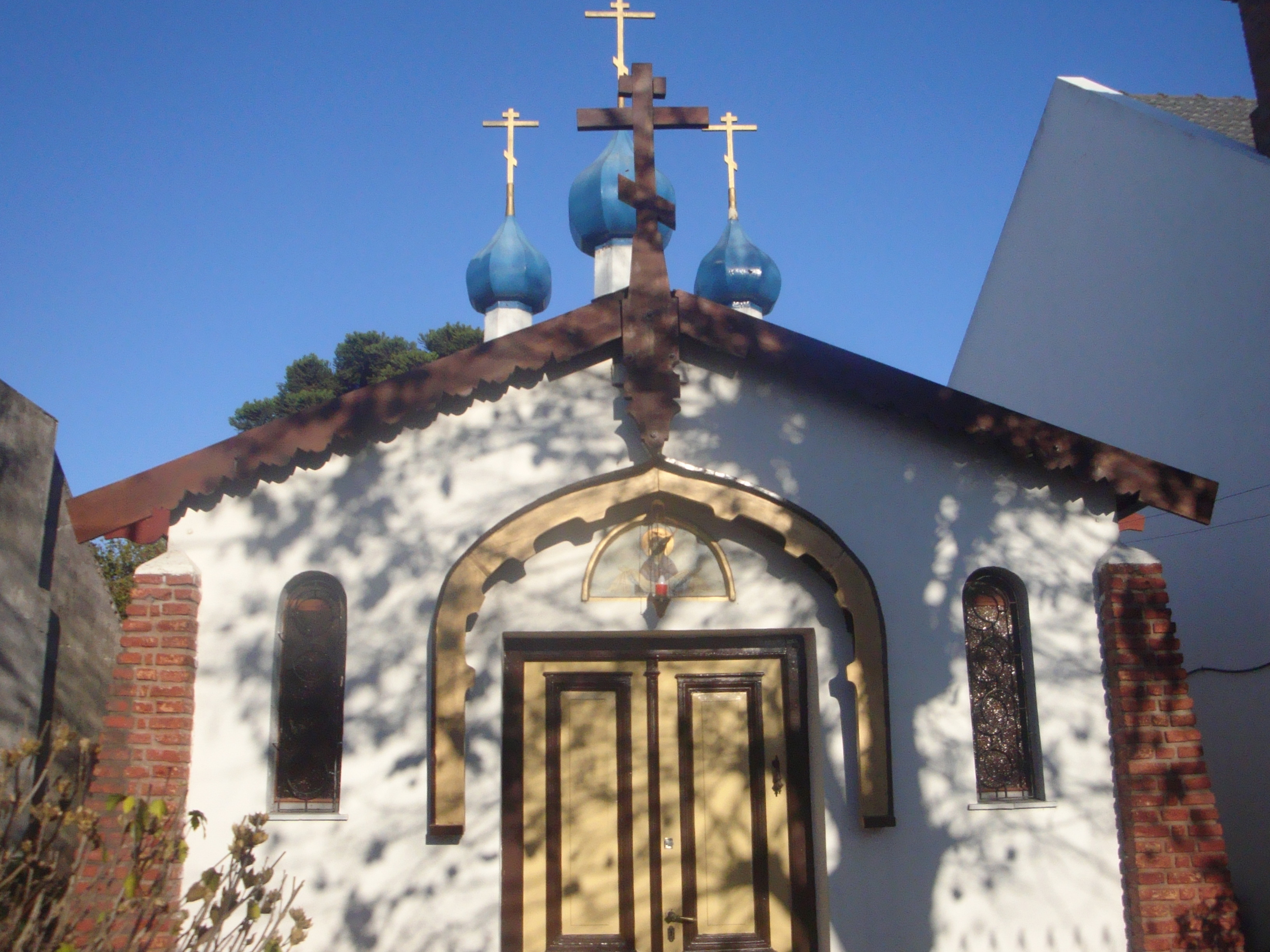
Russian Orthodox Church of Temperley

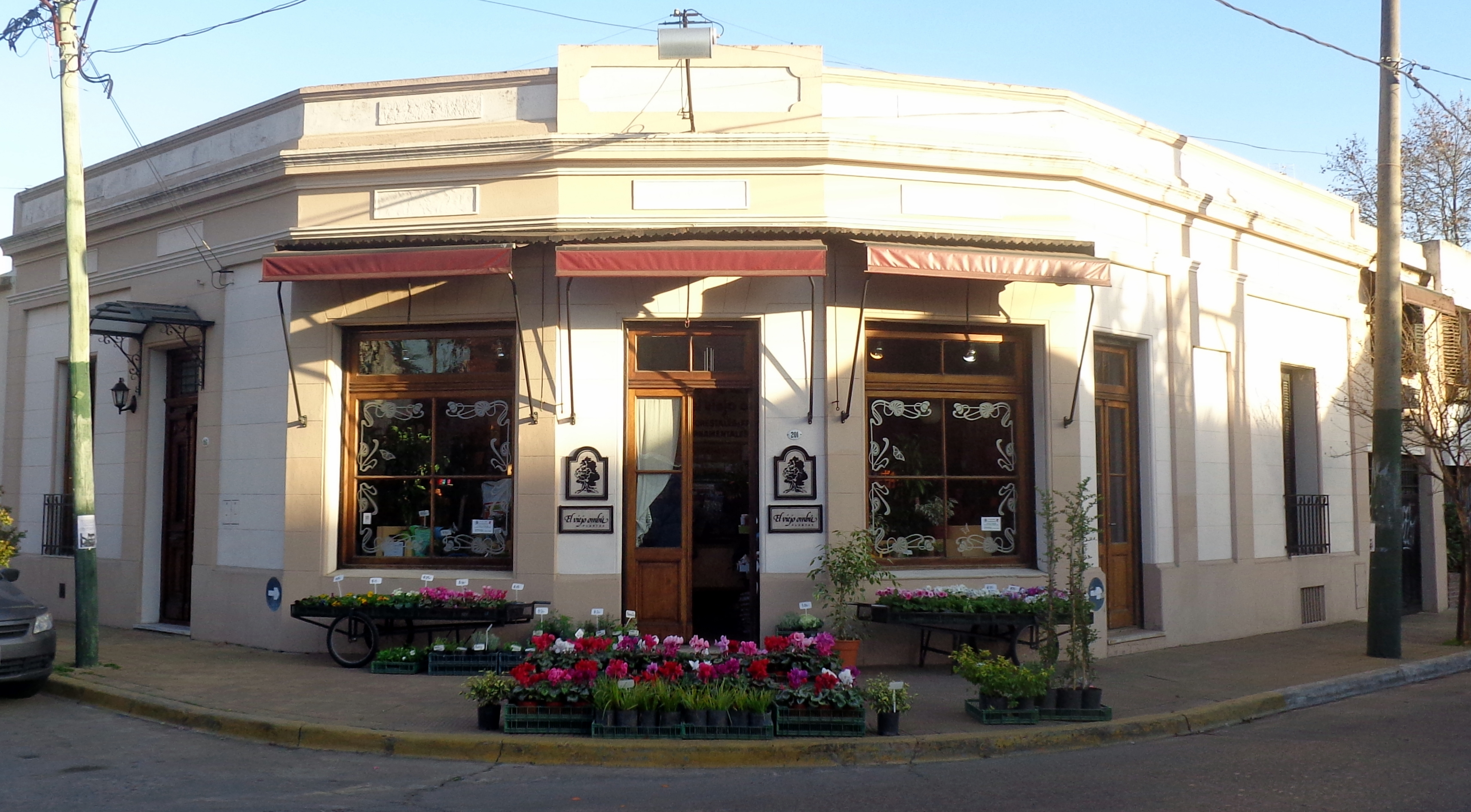
Corner of the streets Espora and Avellaneda, Temperley

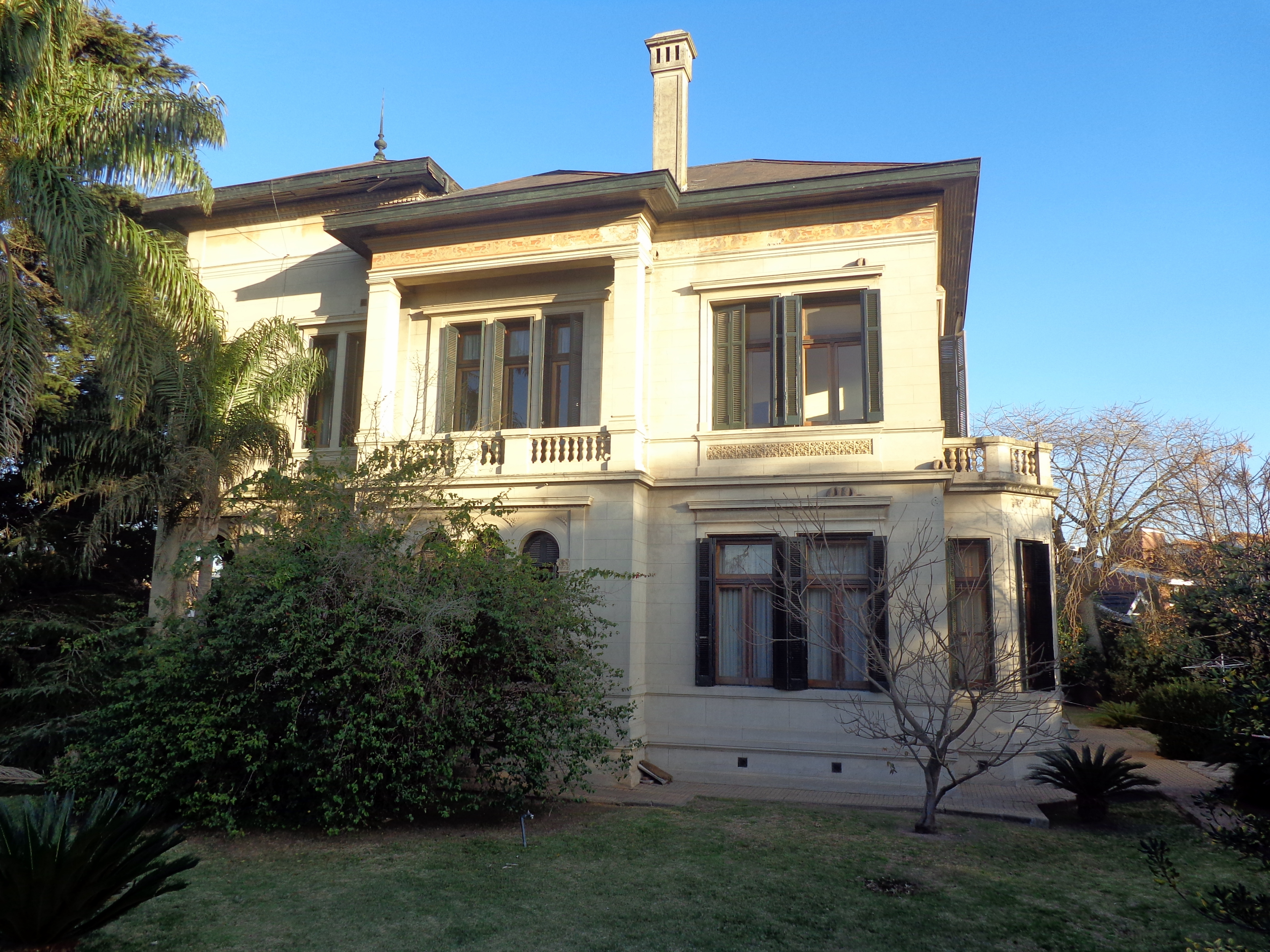
old house of Temperley (Villa Grampa)

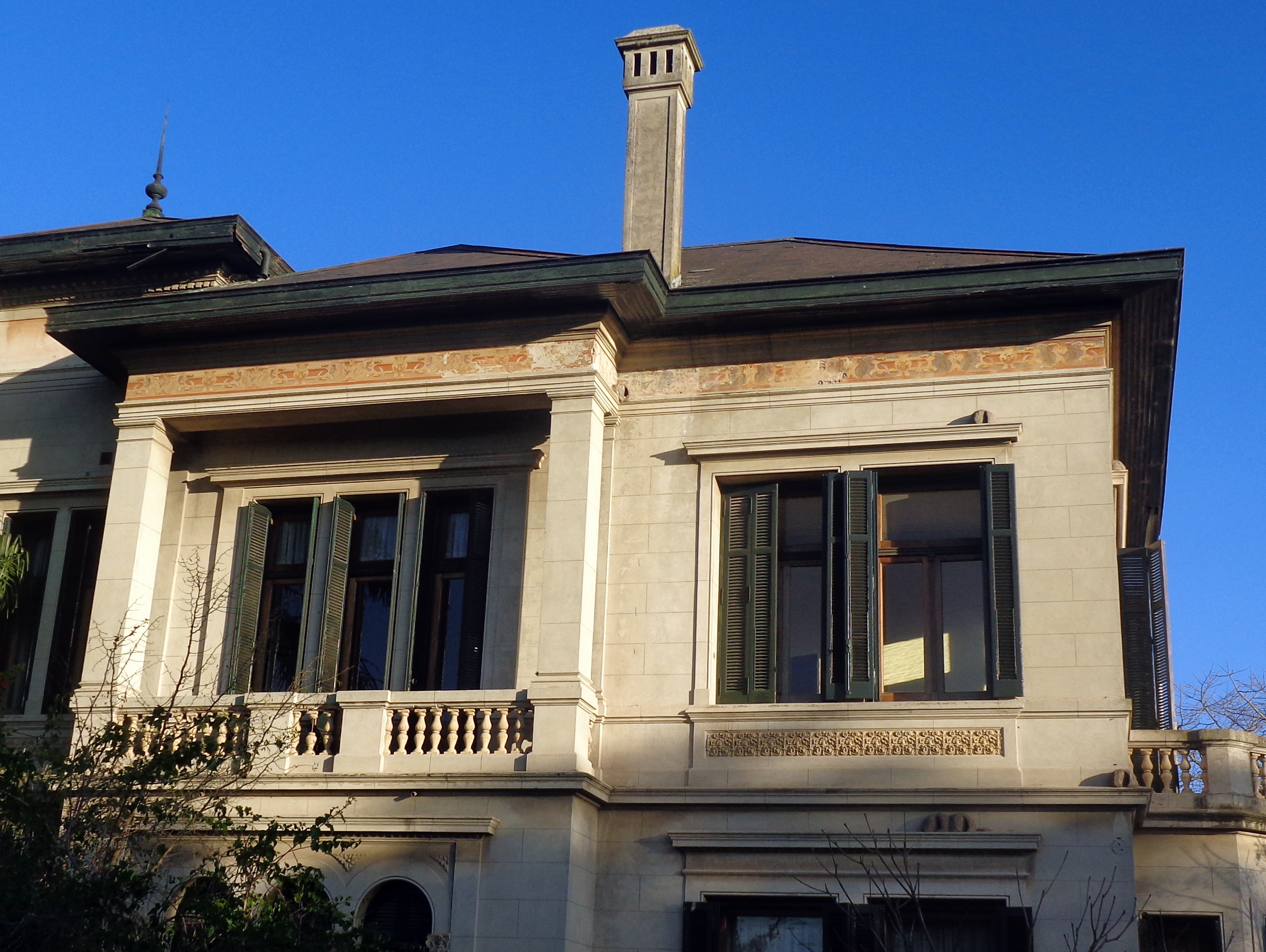
Villa Grampa

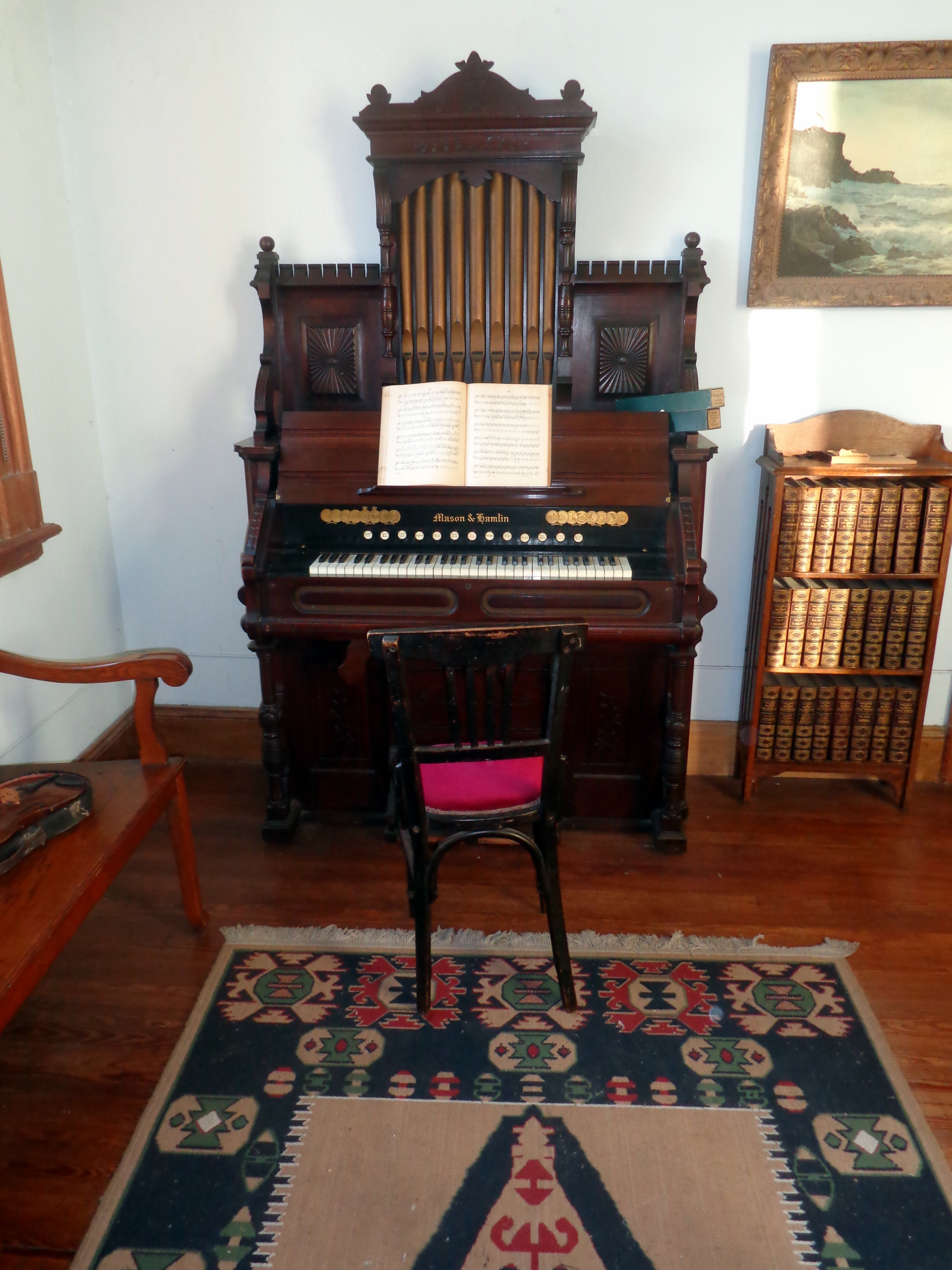
Mason & Hamlin organ (Villa Grampa)

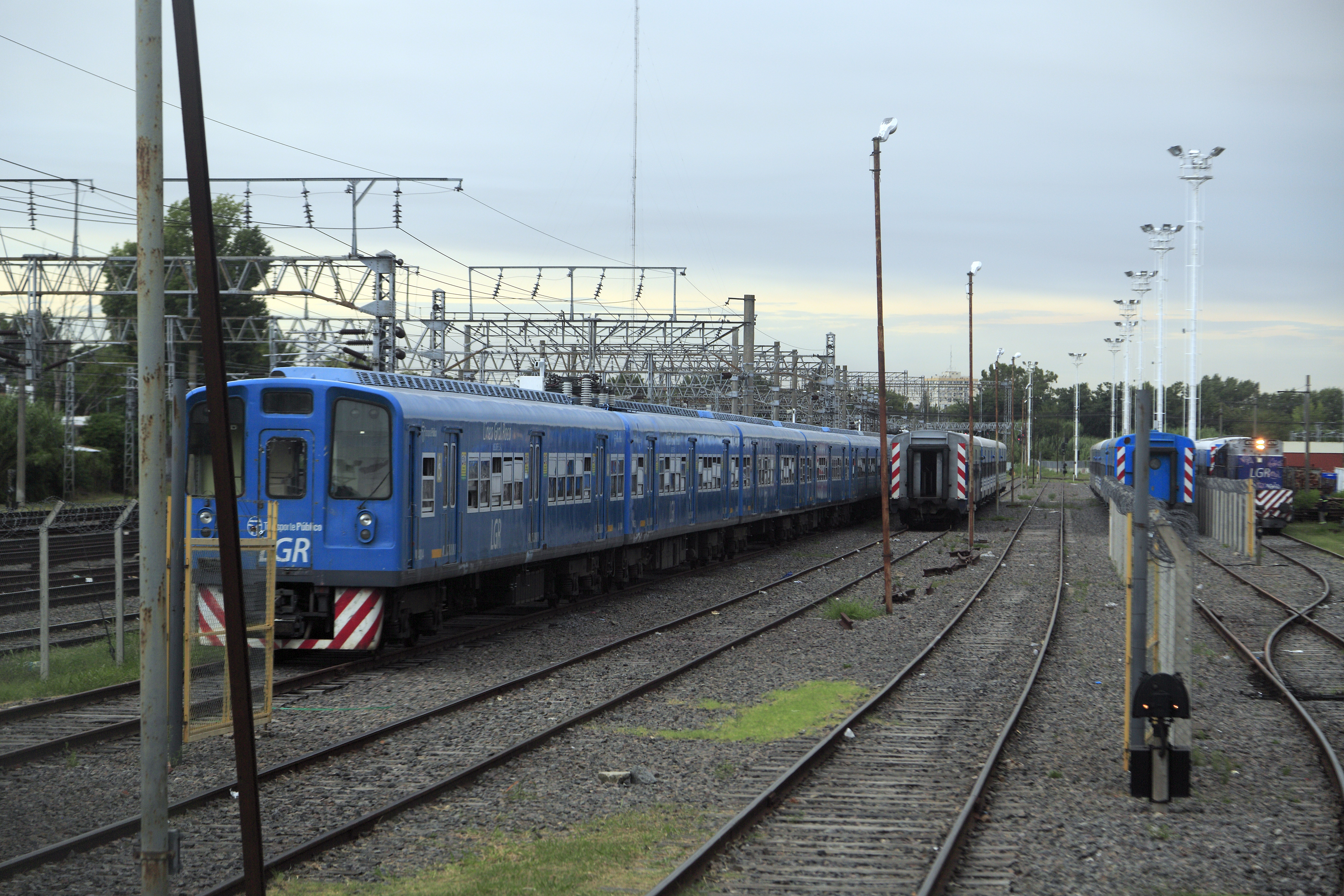
General Roca Railway

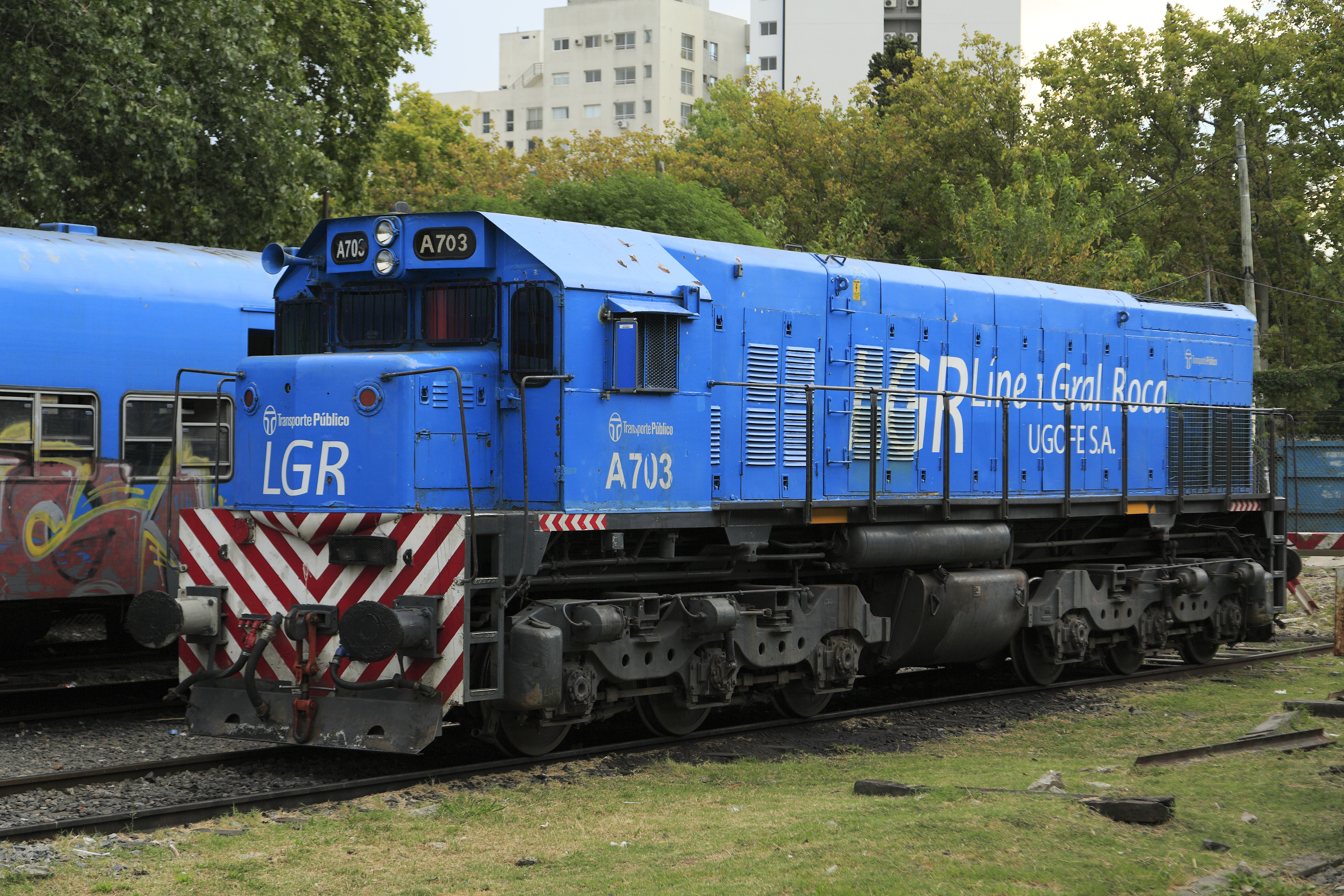
cargo train of General Roca Railway
