= 2025 Argentine legislative election =

- 26 October 2025
- Chamber of Deputies
- 127 of the 257 seats in the Chamber of Deputies
- Turnout: 67.43%
Party	Leader	Vote %	Seats	+/–
LLA	Javier Milei	40.66	64	+54
Fuerza Patria	Axel Kicillof	33.70	47	−1
PU	Juan Schiaretti	7.73	8	−16
FIT – Unidad	Nicolás del Caño	3.90	3	−1
Innovación Federal	Pamela Calletti	2.14	2	−1
Defendamos Córdoba	Natalia de la Sota	0.74	1	+1
For San Juan	Fabián Martín	0.57	1	0
La Neuquinidad	Alliance	0.52	1	+1
This lists parties that won seats. See the complete results below.
- Senate
- 24 of the 72 seats in the Senate
- Turnout: 68.05%
Party	Leader	Vote %	Seats	+/–
LLA	Javier Milei	42.01	13	+13
Fuerza Patria	Axel Kicillof	36.28	9	−6
Innovación Federal	Pamela Calletti	5.75	1	0
La Neuquinidad	Alliance	2.28	1	+1
This lists parties that won seats. See the complete results below.
Chamber of Deputies results by province

Legislative elections were held in Argentina on 26 October 2025. Nearly half of the seats in the Chamber of Deputies (127 of 257) and a third of the seats in the Senate (24 of 72) were contested.

The elections resulted in a decisive victory for incumbent president Javier Milei's party, with La Libertad Avanza (under a single ballot line with Republican Proposal and other smaller parties) winning 64 seats, totalling 95 seats in the Chamber of Deputies. The opposition Homeland Force won 47 seats for a total of 100 seats. The United Provinces, a newly formed coalition of regional and centrist politicians, decreased to a total of 21 seats, and the Workers' Left Front won 3 seats for a total of 4. Other smaller parties won the remaining 5. Turnout reached a record low in modern Argentine history, at 67.43%, despite compulsory voting.

== Background ==
These midterm elections were the first during the presidency of Javier Milei; his libertarian economic reform agenda was top of mind for many voters. The election took place in the aftermath of the 2025 elections in the 2025 Buenos Aires provincial election in which Homeland Force of Governor Axel Kicillof achieved a resounding victory in the province obtaining 47% of the vote compared to 33% of La Libertad Avanza. The results featured the Peronist alliance far over performing polls. As a result of the election, the Argentine Peso lost 5% against the dollar and Argentine stocks slid around 15%.

During a 14 October White House meeting with Milei, US president Donald Trump conditioned a US$20 billion currency swap (in which two governments agree to trade currencies at a fixed rate rather than on the open market) on the electoral success of Milei's party La Libertad Avanza in the election. Trump stated, "If [Milei] doesn't win, we're gone", and that "If [Milei] loses, we are not going to be generous with Argentina." The next day, US Treasury Secretary Scott Bessent told reporters that an additional US$20 billion in financial aid could be provided to Argentina through sovereign funds and investments from private banks. The deal was widely reported as a bailout that prevented Argentina from going into default. The Central Bank of Argentina announced the signature of the first US$20 billion currency swap agreement on 20 October.

== Electoral system ==
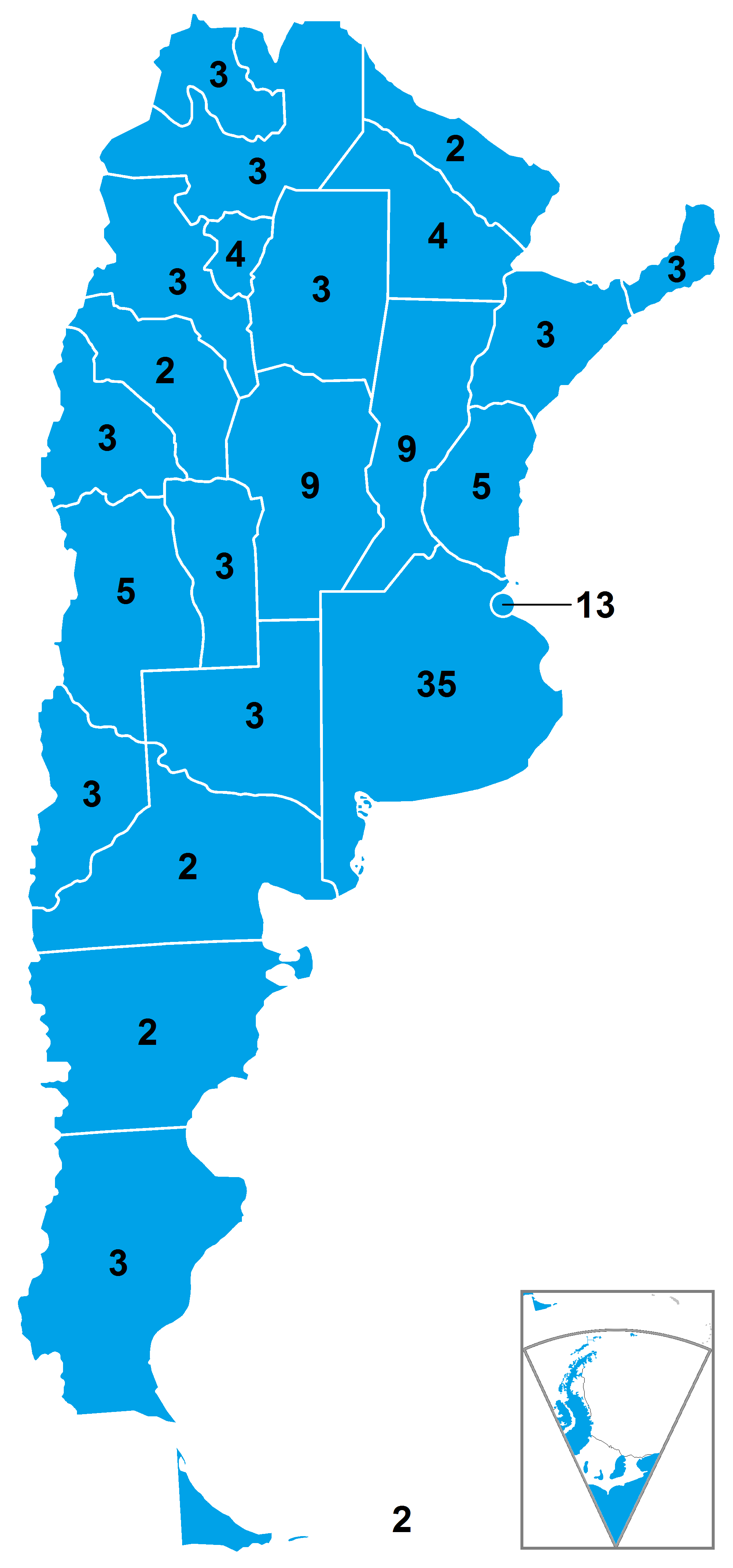
Number of Deputies at stake in each district

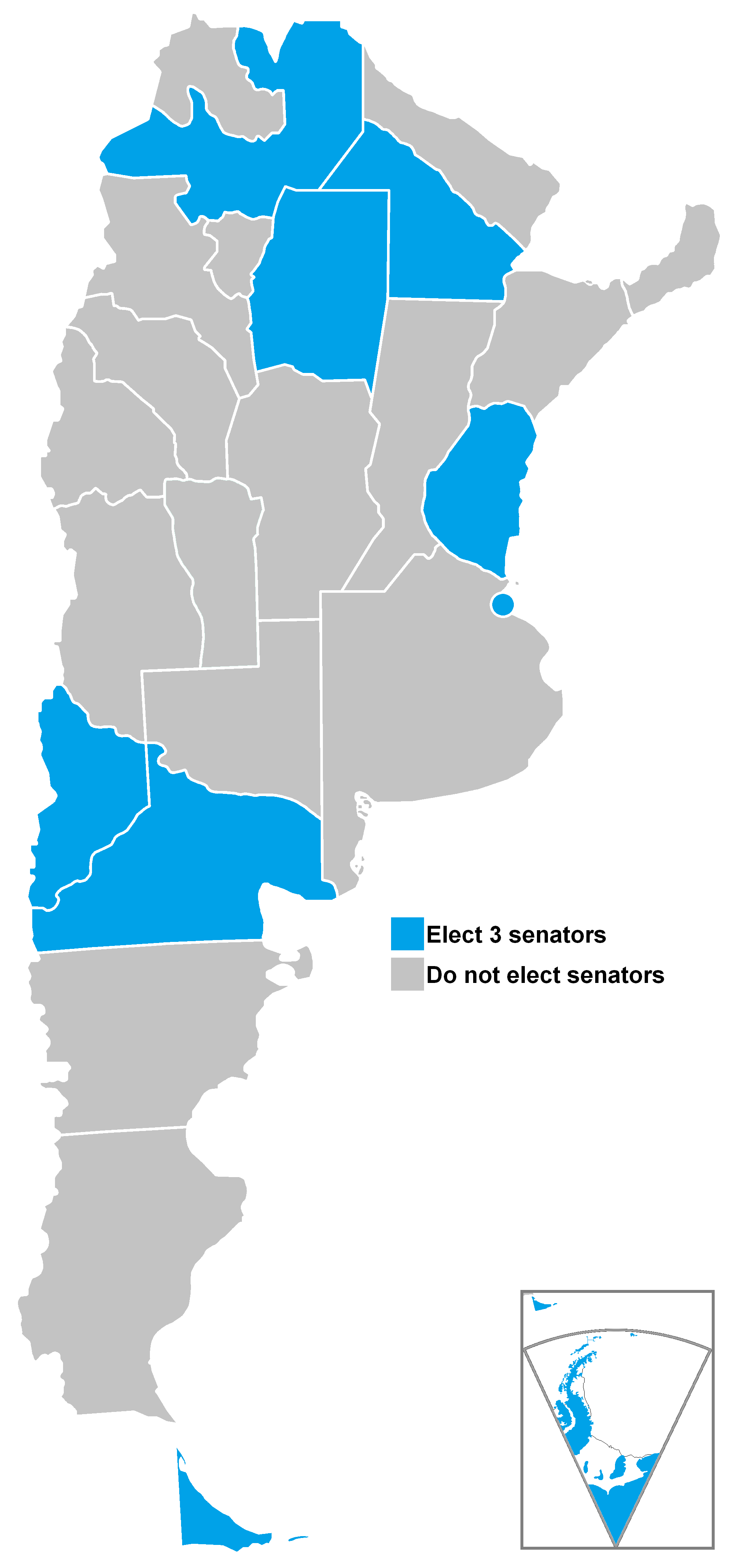
Provinces in which Senators are up for election

The 2025 elections were the first in which the unified paper ballot (in Spanish: Boleta Única de Papel, BUP) system was used, following a 2024 reform of the electoral law. It was also be the first time at the national level since the 2011 Argentine general election without Open, Mandatory and Simultaneous Primaries (PASO); the PASO primary election system was suspended ahead of the 2025 contest but was still legally in place.

=== Chamber of Deputies ===
The 257 members of the Chamber of Deputies are elected by proportional representation in 24 multi-member constituencies based on the provinces (plus the City of Buenos Aires). Seats are allocated using the d'Hondt method, with a 3% electoral threshold. In the 2025 election, 127 of the 257 seats were up for renewal for a four-year term.

Province	Seats	Seats at stake
Buenos Aires	70	35
City of Buenos Aires	25	13
Catamarca	5	3
Chaco	7	4
Chubut	5	2
Córdoba	18	9
Corrientes	7	3
Entre Ríos	9	5
Formosa	5	2
Jujuy	6	3
La Pampa	5	3
La Rioja	5	2
Mendoza	10	5
Misiones	7	3
Neuquén	5	3
Río Negro	5	2
Salta	7	3
San Juan	6	3
San Luis	5	3
Santa Cruz	5	3
Santa Fe	19	9
Santiago del Estero	7	3
Tierra del Fuego	5	2
Tucumán	9	4
Total	257	127

Outgoing deputies
Province	Deputy	Party	Seeking re-election
Buenos Aires	Constanza María Alonso	Union for the Homeland	Not seeking re-election
Buenos Aires	Daniel Fernando Arroyo	Union for the Homeland	Not seeking re-election
Buenos Aires	Gabriela Besana	PRO	Not seeking re-election
Buenos Aires	Victoria Borrego	Civic Coalition ARI	Seeking re-election
Buenos Aires	María Marcela Campagnoli	Civic Coalition ARI	Not seeking re-election
Buenos Aires	María Florencia De Sensi	PRO	Seeking re-election
Buenos Aires	Nicolás del Caño	Workers' Left Front–Unity	Seeking re-election
Buenos Aires	Romina del Plá	Workers' Left Front–Unity	Seeking re-election
Buenos Aires	José Luis Espert	La Libertad Avanza	Resigns re-election
Buenos Aires	Alejandro Finocchiaro	PRO	Seeking re-election
Buenos Aires	Daniel Gollán	Union for the Homeland	Not seeking re-election
Buenos Aires	Rogelio Iparraguirre	Union for the Homeland	Not seeking re-election
Buenos Aires	Mónica Edith Litza	Union for the Homeland	Not seeking re-election
Buenos Aires	Juan Manuel López	Civic Coalition ARI	Seeking re-election
Buenos Aires	Mónica Macha	Union for the Homeland	Not seeking re-election
Buenos Aires	Facundo Manes	Democracy Forever	Not seeking re-election
Buenos Aires	Gerardo Milman	PRO	Not seeking re-election
Buenos Aires	Emilio Monzó	Federal Encounter	Seeking re-election
Buenos Aires	Micaela Morán	Union for the Homeland	Not seeking re-election
Buenos Aires	Leopoldo Raúl Guido Moreau	Union for the Homeland	Not seeking re-election
Buenos Aires	Sergio Omar Palazzo	Union for the Homeland	Seeking re-election
Buenos Aires	Marcela Fabiana Passo	Union for the Homeland	Not seeking re-election
Buenos Aires	Julio César Pereyra	Union for the Homeland	Not seeking re-election
Buenos Aires	Carolina Píparo	La Libertad Avanza	Not seeking re-election
Buenos Aires	Agustina Lucrecia Propato	Union for the Homeland	Seeking re-election
Buenos Aires	Fabio Quetglas	Radical Civic Union	Not seeking re-election
Buenos Aires	Aníbal Florencio Randazzo	Federal Encounter	Seeking re-election
Buenos Aires	Javier Sánchez Wrba	PRO	Seeking re-election
Buenos Aires	Diego César Santilli	PRO	Replaces Espert
Buenos Aires	Vanesa Raquel Siley	Union for the Homeland	Seeking re-election
Buenos Aires	María Sotolano	PRO	Not seeking re-election
Buenos Aires	Margarita Rosa Stolbizer	Federal Encounter	Seeking re-election
Buenos Aires	Danya Tavela	Democracy Forever	Seeking re-election
Buenos Aires	Brenda Vargas Matyi	Union for the Homeland	Not seeking re-election
Buenos Aires	Hugo Rubén Yasky	Union for the Homeland	Seeking re-election
City of Buenos Aires	Sabrina Ajmechet	PRO	Seeking re-election
City of Buenos Aires	María Fernanda Araujo	La Libertad Avanza	Seeking re-election
City of Buenos Aires	Mercedes de Mendieta	Workers' Left Front–Unity	Seeking re-election
City of Buenos Aires	Ana Carla Carrizo	Democracy Forever	Not seeking re-election
City of Buenos Aires	Nicolás Mario Emma	La Libertad Avanza	Seeking re-election
City of Buenos Aires	Carlos Salomón Heller	Union for the Homeland	Not seeking re-election
City of Buenos Aires	Fernando Adolfo Iglesias	PRO	Not seeking re-election
City of Buenos Aires	Ricardo López Murphy	United Republicans	Seeking re-election
City of Buenos Aires	Gisela Marziotta	Union for the Homeland	Not seeking re-election
City of Buenos Aires	Paula Mariana Oliveto Lago	Civic Coalition ARI	Not seeking re-election
City of Buenos Aires	Leandro Santoro	Union for the Homeland	Not seeking re-election
City of Buenos Aires	Martín Alberto Tetaz	Democracy Forever	Not seeking re-election
City of Buenos Aires	María Eugenia Vidal	PRO	Not seeking re-election
Catamarca	Silvana Micaela Ginocchio	Union for the Homeland	Not seeking re-election
Catamarca	Dante Edgardo López Rodríguez	Union for the Homeland	Not seeking re-election
Catamarca	Francisco Monti	League of the Interior	Not seeking re-election
Chaco	María Luisa Chomiak	Union for the Homeland	Not seeking re-election
Chaco	Juan Manuel Pedrini	Union for the Homeland	Not seeking re-election
Chaco	Juan Carlos Polini	Democracy Forever	Not seeking re-election
Chaco	Marilú Quiroz	PRO	Not seeking re-election
Chubut	Eugenia Alianiello	Union for the Homeland	Not seeking re-election
Chubut	Ana Clara Romero	PRO	Seeking re-election
Córdoba	Oscar Agost Agost Carreño	Federal Encounter	Seeking re-election
Córdoba	Héctor Walter Baldassi	PRO	Seeking re-election
Córdoba	Gabriela Brouwer de Koning	Radical Civic Union	Not seeking re-election
Córdoba	María Soledad Carrizo	Radical Civic Union	Not seeking re-election
Córdoba	José Pablo Carro	Union for the Homeland	Seeking re-election
Córdoba	Natalia de la Sota	Federal Encounter	Seeking re-election
Córdoba	Rodrigo de Loredo	Radical Civic Union	Not seeking re-election
Córdoba	Ignacio Jorge García Aresca	Federal Encounter	Seeking re-election
Córdoba	Laura Elena Rodríguez Machado	PRO	Seeking re-election
Córdoba	Laura Elena Rodríguez Machado	PRO	Seeking re-election
Corrientes	Manuel Ignacio Aguirre	Democracy Forever	Not seeking re-election
Corrientes	Sofía Brambilla	PRO	Not seeking re-election
Corrientes	Jorge Antonio Romero	Union for the Homeland	Not seeking re-election
Entre Ríos	Marcela Antola	Democracy Forever	Not seeking re-election
Entre Ríos	Atilio Benedetti	Democracy Forever	Not seeking re-election
Entre Ríos	Ana Carolina Gaillard	Union for the Homeland	Not seeking re-election
Entre Ríos	Nancy Ballejos	PRO	Not seeking re-election
Entre Ríos	Tomás Ledesma	Union for the Homeland	Not seeking re-election
Formosa	Fernando Carbajal	Democracy Forever	Not seeking re-election
Formosa	Gustavo Ramiro Fernández Patri	Union for the Homeland	Not seeking re-election
Jujuy	Leila Chaher	Union for the Homeland	Seeking re-election
Jujuy	Natalia Silvina Sarapura	Radical Civic Union	Not seeking re-election
Jujuy	Alejandro Ariel Vilca	Workers' Left Front–Unity	Seeking re-election
La Pampa	Martín Maquieyra	PRO	Not seeking re-election
La Pampa	Varinia Lis Marín	Union for the Homeland	Seeking re-election
La Rioja	Jorge Ricardo Herrera	Union for the Homeland	Seeking re-election
La Rioja	Gabriela Pedrali	Union for the Homeland	Seeking re-election
Mendoza	Adolfo Bermejo	Union for the Homeland	Not seeking re-election
Mendoza	Julio César Cleto Cobos	Radical Civic Union	Not seeking re-election
Mendoza	Álvaro Fernando Martínez	La Libertad Avanza	Seeking re-election
Mendoza	María Liliana Paponet	Union for the Homeland	Not seeking re-election
Mendoza	Pamela Fernanda Verasay	Radical Civic Union	Seeking re-election
Misiones	Martín Arjol	League of the Interior	Not seeking re-election
Misiones	Carlos Alberto Fernández	Federal Innovation	Not seeking re-election
Misiones	Florencia Naiara Klipauka Lewtak	La Libertad Avanza	Not seeking re-election
Neuquén	Tanya Yanet Bertoldi	Union for the Homeland	Not seeking re-election
Neuquén	Pablo Cervi	League of the Interior	Not seeking re-election
Neuquén	Osvaldo Llancafilo	Neuquén People's Movement	Not seeking re-election
Río Negro	Agustín Domingo	Federal Innovation	Not seeking re-election
Río Negro	Aníbal Tortoriello	PRO	Seeking re-election
Salta	Pamela Calletti	Federal Innovation	Not seeking re-election
Salta	Emiliano Estrada	Union for the Homeland	Seeking re-election
Salta	Carlos Raúl Zapata	La Libertad Avanza	Seeking re-election
San Juan	Walberto Enrique Allende	Union for the Homeland	Not seeking re-election
San Juan	Ana Fabiola Aubone	Union for the Homeland	Not seeking re-election
San Juan	María de Los Ángeles Moreno	Production and Labour	Seeking re-election
San Luis	Alberto Gustavo Arancibia Rodríguez	La Libertad Avanza	Seeking re-election
San Luis	Karina Ethel Bachey	PRO	Not seeking re-election
San Luis	María Natalia Zabala Chacur	Union for the Homeland	Not seeking re-election
Santa Cruz	Sergio Edgardo Acevedo	For Santa Cruz	Not seeking re-election
Santa Cruz	Gustavo Carlos Miguel González	Union for the Homeland	Not seeking re-election
Santa Cruz	Roxana Nahir Claudia Reyes	Radical Civic Union	Not seeking re-election
Santa Fe	Mario Domingo Barletta	United	Not seeking re-election
Santa Fe	Gabriel Felipe Chumpitaz	Future and Freedom	Seeking re-election
Santa Fe	Mónica Haydée Fein	Federal Encounter	Not seeking re-election
Santa Fe	Germana María Figueroa Casas	PRO	Not seeking re-election
Santa Fe	Melina Giorgi	Democracy Forever	Seeking re-election
Santa Fe	Luciano Andrés Laspina	PRO	Not seeking re-election
Santa Fe	Magalí Mastaler	Union for the Homeland	Not seeking re-election
Santa Fe	Roberto Mario Mirabella	Union for the Homeland	Not seeking re-election
Santa Fe	Eduardo Toniolli	Union for the Homeland	Not seeking re-election
Santiago del Estero	Bernardo José Herrera	Union for the Homeland	Not seeking re-election
Santiago del Estero	María Luisa Montoto de Rogel	Union for the Homeland	Not seeking re-election
Santiago del Estero	Nilda Moyano	Union for the Homeland	Not seeking re-election
Tierra del Fuego	Ricardo Juan Garramuño	La Libertad Avanza	Not seeking re-election
Tierra del Fuego	Inés Carolina Yutrovic	Union for the Homeland	Not seeking re-election
Tucumán	Elia Marina Fernández de Mansilla	Independence	Seeking re-election
Tucumán	Agustín Fernández	Independence	Not seeking re-election
Tucumán	Paula Omodeo	CREO	Seeking re-election
Tucumán	Roberto Antonio Sánchez	Radical Civic Union	Seeking re-election

=== Senate ===
The 72 members of the Senate are elected in the same 24 provinces, with three seats in each. The party receiving the most votes in each constituency wins two seats, with the third seat awarded to the second-placed party. In this election, one-third of senate seats were up for election, namely those for the eight provinces of Chaco, Entre Ríos, Neuquén, Río Negro, Salta, Santiago del Estero, Tierra del Fuego, and the City of Buenos Aires.

Outgoing senators
Province	Senator	Party	Seeking re-election
City of Buenos Aires	Martín Lousteau	Radical Civic Union	Not seeking re-election
City of Buenos Aires	Mariano Recalde	Union for the Homeland	Seeking re-election
City of Buenos Aires	Guadalupe Tagliaferri	PRO	Not seeking re-election
Chaco	María Inés Pilatti Vergara	Union for the Homeland	Not seeking re-election
Chaco	Antonio José Rodas	Union for the Homeland	Not seeking re-election
Chaco	Víctor Zimmermann	Radical Civic Union	Not seeking re-election
Entre Ríos	Stefania Cora	Union for the Homeland	Not seeking re-election
Entre Ríos	Alfredo Luis de Angeli	PRO	Not seeking re-election
Entre Ríos	Stella Maris Elisa Olalla de Moreira	Radical Civic Union	Not seeking re-election
Neuquén	Carmen Lucila Crexell	Neuquén People's Movement	Not seeking re-election
Neuquén	Oscar Isidro Parrilli	Union for the Homeland	Not seeking re-election
Neuquén	Silvia Sapag	Union for the Homeland	Seeking re-election
Río Negro	Claudio Martín Doñate	Union for the Homeland	Not seeking re-election
Río Negro	Silvina Marcela García Larraburu	Union for the Homeland	Not seeking re-election
Río Negro	Mónica Esther Silva	Together We Are Río Negro	Not seeking re-election
Salta	Nora del Valle Giménez	Union for the Homeland	Seeking re-election
Salta	Sergio Napoleón Leavy	Union for the Homeland	Seeking re-election
Salta	Juan Carlos Romero	Federal Change	Not seeking re-election
Santiago del Estero	Claudia Ledesma Abdala de Zamora	Union for the Homeland	Not seeking re-election
Santiago del Estero	Gerardo Antenor Montenegro	Union for the Homeland	Not seeking re-election
Santiago del Estero	José Emilio Neder	Union for the Homeland	Seeking re-election
Tierra del Fuego	Pablo Daniel Blanco	Radical Civic Union	Seeking re-election
Tierra del Fuego	María Eugenia Duré	Union for the Homeland	Not seeking re-election
Tierra del Fuego	Cándida Cristina López	Union for the Homeland	Seeking re-election

== Opinion polls ==
=== Polling chart ===
Opinion polling for the 2025 Argentine legislative election using Local regression (LOESS) of polls conducted. Kirchnerism and Federal Peronism entries were merged into UXP.

=== 2025 ===
Polling firm	Fieldwork date	Sample size	La Libertad Avanza	Fuerza Patria	Federal Peronism	Republican Proposal	Radical Civic Union	Workers' Left Front	Others	Undecided	Lead
Fixer	26–31 May 2025	2774	40	32	—	6	5	—	8	11	8
Giacobbe	26 May–2 June 2025	2500	40.9	26.3	4.5	5.9	1.8	3	—	10.4	14.6
UdeSA	21–29 May 2025	1005	29	24		7	3	4	—	17	5
Isasi/Burdman	20–27 May 2025	2500	42	23		8	4	3	20		19
Delfos	15–22 May 2025	2353	38.1	30.6	4.9	8.1	1.6	3.9	2.8	5.1	7.5
Pulso Research	5–11 May 2025	2000	30.5	18.5	7.6	7.1	2.2	3.9	6	24.2	12
Isasi/Burdman	April 2025	—	35	21		10	5	4	25		14
Analogías	26–28 April 2025	2758	29.9	29.7		11.4	5.4	6.4	3.8	13.4	0.2
Management & Fit	14–28 April 2025	2600	36.9	25.9	10.1	9.1	4.1	2.7	4.5	5.1	11
Tendencias	18–23 April 2025	9490	36.1	33.7	2.1	9.2	2.4	5.7	—	10.8	2.4
Zuban Córdoba	16–19 April 2025	1600	34.8	34.4	4.5	6.1	1.7	3.1	—	16.6	0.4
Delfos	11–14 April 2025	2411	35.5	31.3	3.4	8.6	3.1	4.9	3.6	5.1	4.2
Pulso Research	2–9 April 2025	1800	29.8	22.1	6.3	7.2	2.6	5.4	6.1	20.6	7.7
Proyección Consultores	29 March–4 April 2025	2397	29.3	31.7	—	6.4	3.7	2.9	1.9	24.2	2.4
Tendencias	29 March–4 April 2025	8865	36.8	34.6	2.4	11.1		5.6	—	9.5	2.2
Analogías	28–31 March 2025	2864	30.8	30.2	—	10.8	5.3	4.3	—	18.6	0.6
Opina Argentina	1–4 March 2025	2085	38	32	4	7	4	4	3	7	6
Analogías	25–28 February 2025	2733	33.1	30.4	—	10.6	3.6	3	4.6	14.9	2.7
Tendencias	24–28 February 2025	11077	40.9	35.1	1.9	8.2		5.8	—	8.1	5.8
Poliarquía	February 2025	—	36	16	9	9	3	9	2	17	20
Isasi/Burdman	February 2025	—	37	10	11	12	4	3	23		25
Proyección Consultores	17–22 February 2025	2029	28.8	17.9	15.4	5.8	3.3	2.2	2.7	23.9	10.9
Management & Fit	10–21 February 2025	2200	41.6	26.7	9.4	6.4	2.6	3.5	3.1	6.6	14.9
Pulso Research	1–7 February 2025	1777	31.4	18.4	5.4	6.3	3.3	4.5	9.4	21.2	13
Aresco	January 2025	—	47.2	36.1	—	7.9	6	—	2.8	—	11.1
Isasi/Burdman	January 2025	—	36	9	12	10	4	3	4	21	24
Management & Fit	10–21 January 2025	—	42.1	26.5	9.8	7	1.8	2.8	3	7	15.6
Analogías	19–23 January 2025	2645	33.6	31.1	—	8.7	4.4	4.4	—	17.8	2.5
Pulso Research	6–12 January 2025	1900	30.2	15.9	7	5	3.6	4	8.2	26.1	14.3

=== 2024 ===
Polling firm	Fieldwork date	Sample size	La Libertad Avanza	Fuerza Patria	Provincias Unidas	Republican Proposal	Radical Civic Union	Workers' Left Front	Others	Undecided	Lead
D'Alessio Irol – Berensztein	December 2024	1035	35	24	—	17	8	4	9	2	11
Isasi/Burdman	December 2024	2065	37	10	11	9	3	5	21		26
Fixer	11–20 December 2024	1100	37	35	2	6	3	5	—	8	2
Synopsis	5–13 December 2024	—	39.8	26.8	11	5.7	2.9	2.9	4	6.9	13
Pulso Research	4–11 December 2024	1700	32.6	20.8	6	3.8	2.8	3.9	7.7	22.3	11.8
Aresco	December 2024	—	45.4	34.3	—	7	4.1	—	9.1	—	11.1
CB Consultora	2–6 December 2024	1562	39.4	18.5	9	6.6	1.8	5.4	3.8	15	20.9
Sentimetro	3 December 2024	1100	46	14	6	7	2	6	3	16	32
Isasi/Burdman	20 November 2024	2091	34	7	15	14	2	4	21		19
Opinión Lab	12 November 2024	1800	34	24	11	7	3	3	7	10	10
Pulso Research	4–11 November 2024	2091	32.3	15.7	6.3	5.7	1.8	2.9	10.2	25	16.6
Fixer	5 November 2024	1790	34	33	3	7	2	5	—	14	1
Poliarquía	October 2024	—	34	18	8	9	6	6	2	17	16
Opina Argentina	25 October 2024	1764	33	33	5	10	5	3	3	8	Tie
DC Consultores	22 October 2024	—	54.2	8.4	25.3	5.6	3.7	2.8	—	—	28.9
Proyección Consultores	16 October 2024	1822	27.2	20.5	14	8	5.7	3	—	21.6	6.7
Isasi/Burdman	12–17 October 2024	2057	28	9	16	13	4	4	3	23	12
Pulso Research	2–9 October 2024	2000	30	20.7	6.3	6.3	2.9	4.8	9.2	19.7	9.3
Poliarquía	September 2024	—	35	16	12	10	4	4	1	19	19
Pulso Research	2–9 September 2024	2112	29.5	20.4	8.2	7.4	4.7	5.1	7.7	17	9.1
Poliarquía	August 2024	—	39	13	5	13	2	5	1	21	26
Synopsis	8–14 August 2024	1186	30.9	15.8	22.2	9.4	3.6	4.7	2.2	11.2	8.7
Pulso Research	2–8 August 2024	2800	29.3	18.9	9.2	8.1	4.1	5.1	6.6	18.7	10.4
Poliarquía	July 2024	—	36	15	8	14	3	5	2	18	21
Pulso Research	1–10 July 2024	2350	31.7	16.5	11.2	6.1	3.8	6.3	8.2	16.3	15.2
Pulso Research	1–10 June 2024	2661	33.5	18.6	8	5	4.7	5.3	5.4	19.5	14.9
Opinión Lab	3 June 2024	1538	37	17	13	7	3	4	8	12	20
Pulso Research	1–10 May 2024	2113	34.8	17	8.5	6.8	4.4	5.7	—	22.8	17.8
Pulso Research	4–15 April 2024	2014	31.7	15.1	12.1	5	5.3	6	—	24.8	16.6
Pulso Research	4–14 March 2024	1914	34.2	19.7	8.7	5.5	4.2	3.9	—	23.7	14.5

== Results ==
=== Chamber of Deputies ===
Party or alliance		Votes	%	Seats
La Libertad Avanza		9,437,860	40.66	64
Homeland Force	Homeland Force	5,554,230	23.93	30
Homeland Force	Tucumán Primero	526,249	2.27	2
Homeland Force	Civic Front for Santiago	290,968	1.25	2
Homeland Force	Fuerza Justicialista Mendoza	254,447	1.10	1
Homeland Force	Fuerza Entre Ríos	245,691	1.06	2
Homeland Force	Frente de la Victoria	191,267	0.82	1
Homeland Force	Fuerza San Juan	148,046	0.64	1
Homeland Force	Fuerza Patria Peronista	117,748	0.51	1
Homeland Force	Federales Defendamos La Rioja	90,892	0.39	1
Homeland Force	Frente Defendemos La Pampa	90,500	0.39	2
Homeland Force	Frente Unidos Podemos	88,904	0.38	1
Homeland Force	Frente Justicialista	86,942	0.37	1
Homeland Force	Fuerza Santacruceña	53,421	0.23	2
Homeland Force	Victory Party	41,950	0.18	0
Homeland Force	Ahora 503	25,473	0.11	0
Homeland Force	Defendamos Tierra del Fuego	20,103	0.09	0
Homeland Force	Frente Pueblo	17,699	0.08	0
Homeland Force	Total	7,844,530	33.79	47
United Provinces	United Provinces	1,099,412	4.74	5
United Provinces	Vamos Corrientes	185,990	0.80	1
United Provinces	Radical Civic Union	112,173	0.48	0
United Provinces	Ciudadanos Unidos	99,034	0.43	1
United Provinces	Unidos por Tucumán	84,085	0.36	0
United Provinces	Frente Jujuy Crece	81,825	0.35	1
United Provinces	Despierta Chubut	64,008	0.28	0
United Provinces	Defendamos Mendoza - Provincias Unidas	29,120	0.13	0
United Provinces	Socialist Party	26,148	0.11	0
United Provinces	Por Santa Cruz	25,810	0.11	0
United Provinces	Vamos Chaco	17,800	0.08	0
United Provinces	Cambia La Pampa	17,428	0.08	0
United Provinces	Somos Provincias Unidas - Catamarca	14,111	0.06	0
United Provinces	Juntos por la Libertad y la República	12,044	0.05	0
United Provinces	Ciudadanos	10,444	0.04	0
United Provinces	Hacemos	8,129	0.04	0
United Provinces	Hacemos Renacer Catamarca	6,801	0.03	0
United Provinces	Hacemos por Santiago	6,261	0.03	0
United Provinces	Total	1,900,623	8.19	8
Workers' Left Front	Workers' Left Front	860,793	3.71	3
Workers' Left Front	Workers' Socialist Movement	23,507	0.10	0
Workers' Left Front	Workers' Party	20,134	0.09	0
Workers' Left Front	Total	904,434	3.90	3
Innovación Federal	Primero los Salteños	214,854	0.93	1
Innovación Federal	Front for the Renewal of Concord	182,107	0.78	1
Innovación Federal	La Neuquinidad	121,504	0.52	1
Innovación Federal	Juntos Defendemos Río Negro	100,694	0.43	0
Innovación Federal	Total	619,159	2.67	3
Propuesta Federal para el Cambio		246,246	1.06	0
Defendamos Córdoba		170,837	0.74	1
Libertarian Party		157,083	0.68	0
Por San Juan		133,432	0.57	1
Potencia		128,632	0.55	0
Civic Coalition ARI	Civic Coalition ARI	88,679	0.38	0
Civic Coalition ARI	Hagamos Futuro	29,701	0.13	0
Civic Coalition ARI	Primero Catamarca	6,883	0.03	0
Civic Coalition ARI	Total	125,263	0.54	0
Partido Nuevo Buenos Aires		117,149	0.50	0
Patriot Front		114,826	0.49	0
New Movement for Socialism		105,871	0.46	0
Frente Verde		80,597	0.35	0
Unión Federal		79,215	0.34	0
Frente Primero Jujuy Avanza		61,777	0.27	0
Democratic Party		59,504	0.26	0
Proyecto Sur		58,818	0.25	0
Despierta Santiago		58,520	0.25	0
Frente Amplio por la Soberanía		53,564	0.23	0
Faith Party		53,041	0.23	0
Federal Party / Nuevos Aires		51,857	0.22	0
Frente Popular Agrario y Social		50,583	0.22	0
Union of the Democratic Centre / Unión Liberal		44,384	0.19	0
Republican Proposal		34,739	0.15	0
La Fuerza del Trabajo Chubutense		34,704	0.15	0
Encuentro por la República		31,848	0.14	0
Política Obrera		28,387	0.12	0
Más por Neuquén		23,401	0.10	0
Republican Force		22,600	0.10	0
GEN Party		21,169	0.09	0
Nuevas Ideas		20,561	0.09	0
Corrientes nos Une		20,259	0.09	0
Liber.Ar		16,171	0.07	0
Federal Popular Union		15,250	0.07	0
Igualdad y Participación		14,323	0.06	0
Frente Integrador		13,773	0.06	0
Defendamos Santa Fe		13,766	0.06	0
Republicanos Unidos		11,279	0.05	0
Primero Río Negro		11,222	0.05	0
Movimiento de Jubilados y Juventud		11,189	0.05	0
Partido Renacer		10,416	0.04	0
Protector Political Force		10,186	0.04	0
UNIR Constitutional Nationalist Party / Frente Liberal		9,993	0.04	0
Popular Unity		9,683	0.04	0
Partido Activar		9,247	0.04	0
Creo		8,537	0.04	0
Desarrollo Ciudadano		8,247	0.04	0
Integrar		7,925	0.03	0
Partido Ahora		7,719	0.03	0
Frente Vida y Valores por un Nuevo Octubre		7,687	0.03	0
Compromiso Federal		7,561	0.03	0
Renewal Crusade		6,951	0.03	0
Evolución Liberal		6,586	0.03	0
Política Abierta para la Integridad Social		6,531	0.03	0
Integration and Development Movement		6,516	0.03	0
Partido Independiente del Chubut		6,406	0.03	0
Nuevo Espacio de Participación		6,397	0.03	0
Partido Autonomista		6,011	0.03	0
Frente del Pueblo Unido		5,973	0.03	0
Partido del Trabajo y del Pueblo		5,593	0.02	0
Proyecto Alternativo		5,528	0.02	0
Acción para el Cambio		5,041	0.02	0
Córdoba Te Quiero		4,657	0.02	0
Unite por la Libertad y la Dignidad		4,282	0.02	0
Frente Federal de Acción Solidaria		3,894	0.02	0
Movimiento Independiente Renovador		3,869	0.02	0
Dignidad Popular		3,684	0.02	0
FORJA Concertation Party		3,482	0.02	0
Authentic Socialist Party		3,309	0.01	0
Principios y Convicción		3,266	0.01	0
Ideas de la Libertad		3,155	0.01	0
Communist Party		3,031	0.01	0
Movimiento Plural		3,028	0.01	0
Las Fuerzas del Centro		2,965	0.01	0
Partido Polo Social - Movimiento de Bases		1,950	0.01	0
Broad Front		863	0.00	0
Total		23,212,615	100.00	127
Valid votes		23,212,615	94.62	
Invalid votes		611,839	2.49	
Blank votes		706,845	2.88	
Total votes		24,531,299	100.00	
Registered voters/turnout		36,471,355	67.26	

=== Senate ===
Party or alliance		Votes	%	Seats
La Libertad Avanza		2,221,163	42.01	13
Homeland Force	Homeland Force	1,114,856	21.09	5
Homeland Force	Civic Front for Santiago	329,634	6.23	2
Homeland Force	Fuerza Entre Ríos	273,753	5.18	1
Homeland Force	Fuerza Patria Peronista	113,630	2.15	1
Homeland Force	Victory Party	58,373	1.10	0
Homeland Force	Ahora 503	27,988	0.53	0
Homeland Force	Defendamos Tierra del Fuego	20,879	0.39	0
Homeland Force	Total	1,939,113	36.68	9
Innovación Federal	Primero los Salteños	194,619	3.68	1
Innovación Federal	La Neuquinidad	120,553	2.28	1
Innovación Federal	Juntos Defendemos Río Negro	109,339	2.07	0
Innovación Federal	Total	424,511	8.03	2
Workers' Left Front	Workers' Left Front	145,354	2.75	0
Workers' Left Front	Workers' Socialist Movement	19,346	0.37	0
Workers' Left Front	Workers' Party	10,241	0.19	0
Workers' Left Front	Total	174,941	3.31	0
United Provinces	Ciudadanos Unidos	86,100	1.63	0
United Provinces	Socialist Party	24,459	0.46	0
United Provinces	Radical Civic Union	16,143	0.31	0
United Provinces	Vamos Chaco	15,776	0.30	0
United Provinces	Hacemos por Santiago	5,191	0.10	0
United Provinces	United Provinces	3,637	0.07	0
United Provinces	Total	151,306	2.86	0
Despierta Santiago		48,079	0.91	0
GEN Party		38,867	0.74	0
Más por Neuquén		32,703	0.62	0
New Movement for Socialism		32,323	0.61	0
Hagamos Futuro		28,574	0.54	0
Fuerza Libertaria		23,314	0.44	0
Republican Proposal		18,759	0.35	0
Movimiento de Jubilados y Juventud		16,559	0.31	0
Federal Popular Union		13,964	0.26	0
Potencia		19,262	0.36	0
Política Obrera		12,381	0.23	0
Primero Río Negro		11,991	0.23	0
Union of the Democratic Centre		9,075	0.17	0
Frente Integrador		8,873	0.17	0
Partido Renacer		8,290	0.16	0
Federal Party		7,299	0.14	0
Nuevo Espacio de Participación		6,469	0.12	0
Desarrollo Ciudadano		5,866	0.11	0
Patriot Front		5,260	0.10	0
Proyecto Sur		4,724	0.09	0
Dignidad Popular		4,132	0.08	0
UNIR Constitutional Nationalist Party		3,876	0.07	0
Unite por la Libertad y la Dignidad		3,792	0.07	0
Communist Party		3,179	0.06	0
Authentic Socialist Party		3,058	0.06	0
Movimiento Plural		2,675	0.05	0
Partido Polo Social - Movimiento de Bases		1,624	0.03	0
Broad Front		930	0.02	0
Total		5,286,932	100.00	24
Valid votes		5,286,932	94.99	
Invalid votes		139,952	2.51	
Blank votes		138,775	2.49	
Total votes		5,565,659	100.00	
Registered voters/turnout		8,179,347	68.05	

== Analysis ==
This was the first election in which the new single paper ballot system was introduced for national elections. The new system replaces individual party ballots with a unified paper listing all candidates. Parties had to print their own ballots in the previous system, leading towards bias towards wealthier parties as well as the ability to bury opponent parties in a sea of ballots. Nicolás Mayoraz, president of the Constitutional Affairs Committee, hailed the law as a victory for democracy. He claimed it would end corrupt practices like ballot theft. LLA and PRO and some Peronist parties were in favour of this reform, while the opposition coalition Homeland Force were against it.

Data released at 1 pm on election day showed that 23% of the electorate had cast their ballots by 12 pm, a substantial drop from the 2023 Argentine general election in which voter turnout was 30.3% by the same time, although midterm elections (in which the office of President is not up for election) typically have lower turnout. At 9:25 pm, results were published. Despite disapproval ratings reaching 53% in a September poll, Milei's LLA finished in first place with 40.84% of the vote, and the largest opposition party, the Peronist coalition Homeland Force, finished in second place with 31.63% of the vote. Turnout remained lower than usual, at 67.85% of the 36 million eligible voters, the lowest tally for a national election since the return of democracy with the 1983 Argentine general election. Prior polling forecasted LLA attaining 30 to 35% of the vote and the Homeland Force on about the same support.

The elections were a decisive victory for Milei, whose party rebounded despite several political setbacks and unfavourable polls in the previous months. The surprise victory was highlighted by LLA's lead in Buenos Aires Province, a Peronist stronghold that previously had voted for the Peronists by a substantial margin in the 2025 Buenos Aires provincial election held the previous month. According to political scientist Carlos Fara, the rejection of Peronism "carried more weight" than the recent political and corruption scandals surrounding Milei’s government, the run on the Argentine peso and "the fatigue with the President’s leadership style". This was reflected in the low voter turnout.

The result allowed Milei to proceed with his libertarian program. Notably, LLA won just over half of the Chamber of Deputies seats up for election, almost tripling their number of seats and bringing their total to over one-third of the seats in the chamber. This means that opposition parties can no longer obstruct his agenda by overriding his presidential vetoes through a two third majority, although LLA would still need support from other parties to pass its legislation.

== Reactions ==
Former President Mauricio Macri congratulated Milei, and said that Argentines chose to "renew hopes" for the country. US President Donald Trump congratulated Milei for his "crushing victory", adding that the Argentine people had justified the US' trust and support in Milei. Secretary of the Treasury Scott Bessent also congratulated Milei, and highlighted Argentina as a "vital ally" in Latin America.

Israeli Prime Minister Benjamin Netanyahu expressed his "warmest congratulations" to Argentines and President Milei for his "extraordinary victory". Paraguayan President Santiago Peña expressed his satisfaction with Milei's victory, and congratulated the Argentine people. Bolivian President-elect Rodrigo Paz congratulated Milei, saying that his victory confirmed "Argentine citizens' support for his leadership", and that he looked forward to strengthening relations between both countries. Hungarian Prime Minister Viktor Orbán congratulated Milei, and said that they "share a deep respect for freedom and sovereignty", and called Milei a "true patriot". Italian Prime Minister Giorgia Meloni sent her congratulations to the Argentine people and Milei, to whom she referred as a "great friend".

Colombian President Gustavo Petro, a critic of president Milei, posted on X (formerly Twitter) that "progressivism had won in Argentina", which unleashed a wave of criticism from media and opposition politicians labelling his posts a fabrication. Ukrainian President Volodymyr Zelenskyy called Milei to congratulate him for his victory. Zelenskyy also invited Milei to visit Ukraine, and said that both countries have shared projects and interests.
