= List of Argentine deputies, 2025–2027 =

This is a list of members of the Argentine Chamber of Deputies from 10 December 2025 to 10 December 2027.

== Composition ==
=== By province ===
Province	Deputies	Population (2010)
Buenos Aires	70	15,625,084
Buenos Aires City	25	2,890,151
Catamarca	5	367,828
Chaco	7	1,053,466
Chubut	5	506,668
Córdoba	18	3,304,825
Corrientes	7	993,338
Entre Ríos	9	1,236,300
Formosa	5	527,895
Jujuy	6	672,260
La Pampa	5	316,940
La Rioja	5	331,847
Mendoza	10	1,741,610
Misiones	7	1,097,829
Neuquén	5	550,334
Río Negro	5	633,374
Salta	7	1,215,207
San Juan	6	680,427
San Luis	5	431,588
Santa Cruz	5	272,524
Santa Fe	19	3,200,736
Santiago del Estero	7	896,461
Tierra del Fuego	5	126,190
Tucumán	9	1,448,200

=== By political groups ===
Composition of the Chamber by political groups.

127 of the current members of the Chamber of Deputies for the 2025-2027 period were elected in 2025, while the remaining 130 were elected in 2023. The governing party La Libertad Avanza, to which President Javier Milei belongs, is the largest parliamentary bloc, with 95 deputies, while the main opposition, Union for the Homeland, holds 93 deputies.

Bloc	Leader
La Libertad Avanza (95)	Gabriel Bornoroni
Union for the Homeland (93)	Germán Martínez
United Provinces (18)	Gisela Scaglia
PRO (12)	Cristian Ritondo
Federal Innovation (7)	Alberto Arrúa
Radical Civic Union (6)	Pamela Verasay
Workers' Left Front – Unity (4)	Myriam Bregman
Elijo Catamarca (3)	Sebastián Nóblega
Independencia (3)	Gladys Medina
País Federal (3)	Claudio Álvarez
Civic Coalition (2)	Maximiliano Ferraro
Encuentro Federal (2)	Miguel Ángel Pichetto
Integration and Development Movement (2)	Oscar Zago
Production and Labour (2)	Nancy Picón
Adelante Buenos Aires (1)	Karina Banfi
Defendamos Córdoba (1)	Natalia de la Sota
La Neuquinidad (1)	Karina Maureira
For Santa Cruz (1)	José Luis Garrido
Primero San Luis (1)	Jorge Fernández
Source: hcdn.gob.ar (last update: 14 December 2025)

== Chamber leadership ==
Title	Officeholder	Bloc	Province
President	Martín Menem	La Libertad Avanza	La Rioja
First Vice President	Cecilia Moreau	Union for the Homeland	Buenos Aires
Second Vice President	Luis Petri	La Libertad Avanza	Mendoza
Third Vice President	Vacant	—N/a	
Parliamentary Secretary	Adrián Pagan	—N/a	
Administrative Secretary	Laura Emilia Oriolo	—N/a	

== Election cycles ==
Election	Term	
Election	Start	End
2023	10 December 2023	10 December 2027
2025	10 December 2025	10 December 2029

== List of deputies ==
The table is sorted by provinces in alphabetical order, and then with their deputies in alphabetical order by their surnames. All deputies start their term on December 10, and end it on December 9 of the corresponding years, except when noted.

Province	Deputy	Party	Term	
Province	Deputy	Party	From	To
Buenos Aires	Pablo Ansaloni	La Libertad Avanza	2023	2027
Buenos Aires	Karina Banfi	Adelante Buenos Aires	2023	2027
Buenos Aires	Alberto Benegas Lynch	La Libertad Avanza	2023	2027
Buenos Aires	Lilia Adela Bolukalo Lemoine	La Libertad Avanza	2023	2027
Buenos Aires	Santiago Cafiero	Union for the Homeland	2023	2027
Buenos Aires	Alejandro Carrancio	La Libertad Avanza	2025	2029
Buenos Aires	Carlos Daniel Castagneto	Union for the Homeland	2023	2027
Buenos Aires	Giselle Castelnuovo	La Libertad Avanza	2025	2029
Buenos Aires	María Florencia De Sensi	PRO	2025	2029
Buenos Aires	Nicolás del Caño	Workers' Left Front	2025	2029
Buenos Aires	Romina Del Plá	Workers' Left Front	2025	2029
Buenos Aires	Fernanda Díaz	Union for the Homeland	2025	2029
Buenos Aires	Eduardo Falcone	MID	2023	2027
Buenos Aires	Sergio Figliuolo	La Libertad Avanza	2025	2029
Buenos Aires	Alejandro Finocchiaro	PRO	2025	2029
Buenos Aires	Mónica Frade	Civic Coalition	2023	2027
Buenos Aires	Sebastián Galmarini	Union for the Homeland	2025	2029
Buenos Aires	María Teresa García	Union for the Homeland	2025	2029
Buenos Aires	Álvaro García	La Libertad Avanza	2025	2029
Buenos Aires	María Luisa González Estevarena	La Libertad Avanza	2025	2029
Buenos Aires	Juan Grabois	Union for the Homeland	2025	2029
Buenos Aires	Ramiro Gutiérrez	Union for the Homeland	2023	2027
Buenos Aires	Gladys Humenuk	La Libertad Avanza	2025	2029
Buenos Aires	Pablo Juliano	United Provinces	2023	2027
Buenos Aires	Máximo Carlos Kirchner	Union for the Homeland	2023	2027
Buenos Aires	Johanna Sabrina Longo	La Libertad Avanza	2025	2029
Buenos Aires	María Jimena López	Union for the Homeland	2025	2029
Buenos Aires	Lorena Macyszyn	La Libertad Avanza	2023	2027
Buenos Aires	Mario Manrique	Union for the Homeland	2023	2027
Buenos Aires	Juan Marino	Union for the Homeland	2023	2027
Buenos Aires	Nicolás Massot	Federal Encounter	2023	2027
Buenos Aires	Fernanda Miño	Union for the Homeland	2025	2029
Buenos Aires	Matías Molle	Union for the Homeland	2023	2027
Buenos Aires	Guillermo Maximiliano Montenegro	La Libertad Avanza	2023	2027
Buenos Aires	Roxana Monzón	Union for the Homeland	2023	2027
Buenos Aires	Cecilia Moreau	Union for the Homeland	2023	2027
Buenos Aires	Hugo Antonio Moyano	Union for the Homeland	2025	2029
Buenos Aires	Miriam Niveyro	La Libertad Avanza	2025	2029
Buenos Aires	Joaquín Ojeda	La Libertad Avanza	2025	2029
Buenos Aires	Marcela Marina Pagano	Coherencia	2023	2027
Buenos Aires	Sergio Omar Palazzo	Union for the Homeland	2025	2029
Buenos Aires	Sebastián Pareja	La Libertad Avanza	2025	2029
Buenos Aires	María Lorena Petrovich	La Libertad Avanza	2025 (Note: Since 10 December 2025, replacing Silvia Lospennato, who resigned on 9 December to take office as a member of the Buenos Aires City Legislature.)	2027
Buenos Aires	Miguel Ángel Pichetto	Federal Encounter	2023	2027
Buenos Aires	Horacio Pietragalla Corti	Union for the Homeland	2025	2029
Buenos Aires	Néstor Pitrola	Workers' Left Front	2025 (Note: Since 10 December 2025, replacing Christian Castillo, who resigned under a rotation agreement of the Workers' Left Front.)	2027
Buenos Aires	Luciana Potenza	Union for the Homeland	2023	2027
Buenos Aires	Agustina Lucrecia Propato	Union for the Homeland	2025	2029
Buenos Aires	Karen Reichardt	La Libertad Avanza	2025	2029
Buenos Aires	Cristian Adrián Ritondo	PRO	2023	2027
Buenos Aires	Marina Dorotea Salzmann	Union for the Homeland	2025	2029
Buenos Aires	Javier Sánchez Wrba	PRO	2025	2029
Buenos Aires	Juliana Santillán Juárez Brahim	La Libertad Avanza	2023	2027
Buenos Aires	Santiago Santurio	La Libertad Avanza	2023	2027
Buenos Aires	Sabrina Selva	Union for the Homeland	2023	2027
Buenos Aires	Vanesa Raquel Siley	Union for the Homeland	2025	2029
Buenos Aires	Julia Strada	Union for the Homeland	2023	2027
Buenos Aires	Jorge Taiana	Union for the Homeland	2025	2029
Buenos Aires	Rodolfo Tailhade	Union for the Homeland	2023	2027
Buenos Aires	Victoria Tolosa Paz	Union for the Homeland	2023	2027
Buenos Aires	Rubén Darío Torres	La Libertad Avanza	2025	2029
Buenos Aires	Nicolás Alfredo Trotta	Union for the Homeland	2025	2029
Buenos Aires	Hernán Urien	La Libertad Avanza	2025	2029
Buenos Aires	Patricia María Vásquez	La Libertad Avanza	2023	2027
Buenos Aires	María Elena Velázquez	Union for the Homeland	2025	2029
Buenos Aires	Andrea Fernanda Vera	La Libertad Avanza	2025	2029
Buenos Aires	Luana Volnovich	Union for the Homeland	2023	2027
Buenos Aires	Hugo Yasky	Union for the Homeland	2025	2029
Buenos Aires	Martín Yeza	PRO	2023	2027
Buenos Aires	Natalia Zaracho	Union for the Homeland	2023	2027
City of Buenos Aires	Sabrina Ajmechet	La Libertad Avanza	2025	2029
City of Buenos Aires	Javier Andrade	Union for the Homeland	2025 (Note: Since 10 December 2025, replacing Itai Hagman, who resigned to assume a 2025–2029 term as national deputy.)	2027
City of Buenos Aires	Damián Arabia	La Libertad Avanza	2023	2027
City of Buenos Aires	Myriam Bregman	Workers' Left Front	2025	2029
City of Buenos Aires	Lucía Cámpora	Union for the Homeland	2025	2029
City of Buenos Aires	Mariela Coletta	United Provinces	2023	2027
City of Buenos Aires	Fernando de Andreis	PRO	2025	2029
City of Buenos Aires	Nicolás Emma	La Libertad Avanza	2025	2029
City of Buenos Aires	Alejandro Fargosi	La Libertad Avanza	2025	2029
City of Buenos Aires	Daiana Fernández Molero	PRO	2023	2027
City of Buenos Aires	Maximiliano Ferraro	Civic Coalition	2023	2027
City of Buenos Aires	Alida Ferreyra	La Libertad Avanza	2024 (Note: Since 31 January 2024, replacing Diana Mondino, who resigned as deputy-elect to become Minister of Foreign Affairs.)	2027
City of Buenos Aires	Antonela Giampieri	PRO	2025	2029
City of Buenos Aires	Silvana Giudici	La Libertad Avanza	2023	2027
City of Buenos Aires	Álvaro González	PRO	2023	2027
City of Buenos Aires	Itai Hagman	Union for the Homeland	2025	2029
City of Buenos Aires	Patricia Holzman	La Libertad Avanza	2025	2029
City of Buenos Aires	Andrés Leone	La Libertad Avanza	2025	2029
City of Buenos Aires	Martín Lousteau	United Provinces	2025	2029
City of Buenos Aires	Raquel Cecilia "Kelly" Kismer de Olmos	Union for the Homeland	2025	2029
City of Buenos Aires	Paula Andrea Penacca	Union for the Homeland	2023	2027
City of Buenos Aires	Lorena Pokoik	Union for the Homeland	2023	2027
City of Buenos Aires	Santiago Luis Roberto	Union for the Homeland	2025	2029
City of Buenos Aires	Eduardo Félix Valdés	Union for the Homeland	2023	2027
City of Buenos Aires	Oscar Zago	MID	2023	2027
Catamarca	Fernanda Ávila	Elijo Catamarca	2023	2027
Catamarca	Adrián Brizuela	La Libertad Avanza	2025	2029
Catamarca	Fernando Monguillot	Elijo Catamarca	2025	2029
Catamarca	Sebastián Nóblega	Elijo Catamarca	2023	2027
Catamarca	Claudia María Palladino	Union for the Homeland	2025	2029
Chaco	Guillermo César Agüero	Radical Civic Union	2025	2029
Chaco	Julieta Marisol Campo	Union for the Homeland	2025	2029
Chaco	Gerardo Cipolini	Radical Civic Union	2023	2027
Chaco	Sergio Dolce	Union for the Homeland	2025	2029
Chaco	Carlos García	La Libertad Avanza	2023	2027
Chaco	Rosario Goitia	La Libertad Avanza	2025	2029
Chaco	Aldo Leiva	Union for the Homeland	2023	2027
Chubut	Jorge Antonio Ávila	United Provinces	2023	2027
Chubut	Maira Frías	La Libertad Avanza	2025	2029
Chubut	José Glinski	Union for the Homeland	2023	2027
Chubut	Juan Pablo Luque	Union for the Homeland	2025	2029
Chubut	César Treffinger	La Libertad Avanza	2023	2027
Córdoba	Belén Avico	La Libertad Avanza	2023	2027
Córdoba	Carolina Basualdo	United Provinces	2025	2029
Córdoba	Gabriel Bornoroni	La Libertad Avanza	2023	2027
Córdoba	Juan Fernando Brügge	United Provinces	2023	2027
Córdoba	Natalia de la Sota	Defendamos Córdoba	2025	2029
Córdoba	Gabriela Beatriz Estévez	Union for the Homeland	2023	2027
Córdoba	Ignacio García Aresca	United Provinces	2025	2029
Córdoba	Carlos Mario Gutiérrez	United Provinces	2023	2027
Córdoba	María Cecilia Ibáñez	La Libertad Avanza	2023	2027
Córdoba	Enrique Lluch	La Libertad Avanza	2025	2029
Córdoba	Marcos Patiño Brizuela	La Libertad Avanza	2025	2029
Córdoba	Luis Albino Picat	La Libertad Avanza	2023	2027
Córdoba	María Celeste Ponce	La Libertad Avanza	2023	2027
Córdoba	Gonzalo Roca	La Libertad Avanza	2025	2029
Córdoba	Laura Elena Rodríguez Machado	La Libertad Avanza	2025	2029
Córdoba	Juan Schiaretti	United Provinces	2025	2029
Córdoba	Laura Soldano	La Libertad Avanza	2025	2029
Córdoba	Alejandra Torres	United Provinces	2023	2027
Corrientes	Lisandro Almirón	La Libertad Avanza	2023	2027
Corrientes	María Virginia Gallardo	La Libertad Avanza	2025	2029
Corrientes	Diógenes Ignacio González	Radical Civic Union	2025	2029
Corrientes	Raúl Hadad	Union for the Homeland	2025	2029
Corrientes	Nancy Sand	Union for the Homeland	2023	2027
Corrientes	José Federico Tournier	La Libertad Avanza	2024 (Note: Since 14 August 2024, replacing Alfredo Vallejos, who resigned on 15 July to become Minister of Security of Corrientes Province.)	2027
Corrientes	Christian Alejandro Zulli	Union for the Homeland	2023	2027
Entre Ríos	Beltrán Benedit	La Libertad Avanza	2023	2027
Entre Ríos	Gustavo Bordet	Union for the Homeland	2023	2027
Entre Ríos	Alicia Fregonese	PRO	2025	2029
Entre Ríos	Andrés Ariel Laumann	La Libertad Avanza	2025	2029
Entre Ríos	Marianela Marclay	Union for the Homeland	2025	2029
Entre Ríos	Guillermo Michel	Union for the Homeland	2025	2029
Entre Ríos	Francisco Morchio	La Libertad Avanza	2023	2027
Entre Ríos	Blanca Inés Osuna	Union for the Homeland	2023	2027
Entre Ríos	Darío Schneider	Radical Civic Union	2025	2029
Formosa	Luis Eugenio Basterra	Union for the Homeland	2023	2027
Formosa	Atilio Basualdo	La Libertad Avanza	2025 (Note: Since 17 December 2025.)	2029
Formosa	María Graciela de la Rosa	Union for the Homeland	2025	2029
Formosa	Gerardo Gustavo González	Federal Innovation	2023	2027
Formosa	María Graciela Parola	Union for the Homeland	2023	2027
Jujuy	Bárbara Andreussi	La Libertad Avanza	2025	2029
Jujuy	Alfredo Gonzales	La Libertad Avanza	2025	2029
Jujuy	Manuel Quintar	La Libertad Avanza	2023	2027
Jujuy	Jorge Rizzotti	United Provinces	2023	2027
Jujuy	Guillermo Snopek	Union for the Homeland	2023	2027
Jujuy	María Inés Zigarán	United Provinces	2025	2029
La Pampa	Martín Ardohain	PRO	2023	2027
La Pampa	Abelardo Ferrán	Union for the Homeland	2025	2029
La Pampa	Varinia Lis Marín	Union for the Homeland	2025	2029
La Pampa	Ariel Rauschenberger	Union for the Homeland	2023	2027
La Pampa	Martín Matzkin	La Libertad Avanza	2026 (Note: Since 24 June 2026, replacing Adrián Ravier, who resigned to become Presidential Spokesperson of Argentina.)	2029
La Rioja	Hilda Aguirre de Soria	Union for the Homeland	2023	2027
La Rioja	Sergio Guillermo Casas	Union for the Homeland	2023	2027
La Rioja	Martín Menem	La Libertad Avanza	2023	2027
La Rioja	Gabriela Pedrali	Union for the Homeland	2025	2029
La Rioja	Gino Visconti	La Libertad Avanza	2025	2029
Mendoza	Lourdes Micaela Arrieta	United Provinces	2023	2027
Mendoza	Martín Aveiro	Union for the Homeland	2023	2027
Mendoza	Facundo Correa Llano	La Libertad Avanza	2023	2027
Mendoza	Emir Félix	Union for the Homeland	2025	2029
Mendoza	Mercedes Llano	La Libertad Avanza	2023	2027
Mendoza	Álvaro Martínez	La Libertad Avanza	2025	2029
Mendoza	Julieta Metral Asensio	La Libertad Avanza	2025	2029
Mendoza	Lisandro Nieri	Radical Civic Union	2023	2027
Mendoza	Luis Petri	La Libertad Avanza	2025	2029
Mendoza	Pamela Fernanda Verasay	Radical Civic Union	2025	2029
Misiones	Alberto Arrúa	Federal Innovation	2023	2027
Misiones	Emmanuel Bianchetti	PRO	2023	2027
Misiones	Maura Gruber	La Libertad Avanza	2025	2029
Misiones	Diego Hartfield	La Libertad Avanza	2025	2029
Misiones	Oscar Herrera Ahuad	Federal Innovation	2025	2029
Misiones	Yamila Ruíz	Federal Innovation	2023	2027
Misiones	Daniel Vancsik	Federal Innovation	2023	2027
Neuquén	Karina Maureira	La Neuquinidad	2025	2029
Neuquén	Soledad Mondaca	La Libertad Avanza	2025	2029
Neuquén	Gabriela Luciana Muñoz	La Libertad Avanza	2025 (Note: Since 10 December 2025, replacing Nadia Márquez, who resigned to become a national senator.)	2027
Neuquén	Gastón Riesco	La Libertad Avanza	2025	2029
Neuquén	Pablo Todero	Union for the Homeland	2023	2027
Río Negro	Sergio Eduardo Capozzi	United Provinces	2023	2027
Río Negro	Marcelo Mango	Union for the Homeland	2025 (Note: Since 10 December 2025, replacing Martín Soria, who resigned on 9 December to become a national senator.)	2027
Río Negro	Adriana Cristina Serquis	Union for the Homeland	2025	2029
Río Negro	Aníbal Tortoriello	La Libertad Avanza	2025	2029
Río Negro	Lorena Villaverde	La Libertad Avanza	2023	2027
Salta	Bernardo Biella	Federal Innovation	2025	2029
Salta	Eliana Bruno	La Libertad Avanza	2025 (Note: Since 10 December 2025, replacing Emilia Orozco, who resigned to become a national senator.)	2027
Salta	María Gabriela Flores	La Libertad Avanza	2025	2029
Salta	Julio Moreno Ovalle	La Libertad Avanza	2023	2027
Salta	Pablo Outes	Federal Innovation	2023	2027
Salta	Yolanda Vega	Federal Innovation	2023	2027
Salta	Carlos Raúl Zapata	La Libertad Avanza	2025	2029
San Juan	Cristian Andino	Union for the Homeland	2025	2029
San Juan	Jorge Chica	Union for the Homeland	2023	2027
San Juan	Abel Chiconi	La Libertad Avanza	2025	2029
San Juan	Carlos Gustavo Jaime Quiroga	Production and Labour	2025	2029
San Juan	José Peluc	La Libertad Avanza	2023	2027
San Juan	Nancy Viviana Picón Martínez	Production and Labour	2023	2027
San Luis	Ernesto Nader Alí	Union for the Homeland	2024 (Note: Since 31 January 2024.)	2027
San Luis	Carlos Alberto Almena	La Libertad Avanza	2025	2029
San Luis	Claudio Álvarez	Federal Innovation	2025 (Note: Since 10 December 2025, replacing Carlos D'Alessandro, who resigned to become a provincial deputy in San Luis.)	2027
San Luis	Mónica Becerra	La Libertad Avanza	2025	2029
San Luis	Jorge "Gato" Fernández	Primero San Luis	2025	2029
Santa Cruz	José Luis Garrido	For Santa Cruz	2023	2027
Santa Cruz	Jairo Guzmán	La Libertad Avanza	2025	2029
Santa Cruz	Ana María Ianni	Union for the Homeland	2023	2027
Santa Cruz	Moira Lanesan Sancho	Union for the Homeland	2025	2029
Santa Cruz	Juan Carlos Molina	Union for the Homeland	2025	2029
Santa Fe	Rocío Bonacci	La Libertad Avanza	2023	2027
Santa Fe	Alejandro Bongiovanni	La Libertad Avanza	2023	2027
Santa Fe	Alejandrina Borgatta	Union for the Homeland	2025	2029
Santa Fe	Florencia Carignano	Union for the Homeland	2023	2027
Santa Fe	Romina Diez	La Libertad Avanza	2023	2027
Santa Fe	Pablo Farías	United Provinces	2025	2029
Santa Fe	Diego Alberto Giuliano	Union for the Homeland	2023	2027
Santa Fe	Germán Pedro Martínez	Union for the Homeland	2023	2027
Santa Fe	Nicolás Mayoraz	La Libertad Avanza	2023	2027
Santa Fe	Juan Pablo Montenegro	La Libertad Avanza	2025	2029
Santa Fe	José Núñez	United Provinces	2023	2027
Santa Fe	Esteban Paulón	United Provinces	2023	2027
Santa Fe	Agustín Pellegrini	La Libertad Avanza	2025	2029
Santa Fe	Valentina Ravera	La Libertad Avanza	2025	2029
Santa Fe	Verónica Razzini	La Libertad Avanza	2023	2027
Santa Fe	Agustín Oscar Rossi	Union for the Homeland	2025	2029
Santa Fe	Gisela Scaglia	United Provinces	2025	2029
Santa Fe	Caren Tepp	Union for the Homeland	2025	2029
Santa Fe	Yamile Tomassoni	La Libertad Avanza	2025	2029
Santiago del Estero	Marcelo Barbur	Union for the Homeland	2025	2029
Santiago del Estero	Celia Campitelli	Union for the Homeland	2023	2027
Santiago del Estero	Ricardo Daives	Union for the Homeland	2023	2027
Santiago del Estero	José Edgardo Gómez	Union for the Homeland	2023	2027
Santiago del Estero	Cecilia López Pasquali	Union for the Homeland	2025	2029
Santiago del Estero	Jorge Mukdise	Union for the Homeland	2025	2029
Santiago del Estero	Estela Mary Neder	Union for the Homeland	2023	2027
Tierra del Fuego	Jorge Neri Araujo Hernández	Union for the Homeland	2023	2027
Tierra del Fuego	Andrea Freites	Union for the Homeland	2023	2027
Tierra del Fuego	Santiago Pauli	La Libertad Avanza	2023	2027
Tierra del Fuego	Miguel Rodríguez	La Libertad Avanza	2025	2029
Tierra del Fuego	Paulo Agustín Tita	Union for the Homeland	2025	2029
Tucumán	Mariano Campero	La Libertad Avanza	2023	2027
Tucumán	Carlos Aníbal Cisneros	Union for the Homeland	2023	2027
Tucumán	Elia Marina Fernández de Mansilla	Independencia	2023	2027
Tucumán	Gerardo Huesen	La Libertad Avanza	2023	2027
Tucumán	Gladys Medina	Independencia	2025	2029
Tucumán	Soledad Molinuevo	La Libertad Avanza	2025	2029
Tucumán	Javier Noguera	Independencia	2025	2029
Tucumán	Federico Agustín Pelli	La Libertad Avanza	2025	2029
Tucumán	Pablo Raúl Yedlin	Union for the Homeland	2023	2027
