= Caletti =

Caletti is an Italian surname. Notable people with the surname include:

- Deb Caletti (born 1963), American writer
- Giuseppe Caletti or Calletti (c. 1600 - c. 1660), Italian painter and engraver of the Baroque period
- Joe Caletti (born 1998), Australian professional soccer player

== See also ==
- Pamela Calletti (born 1979), Argentine politician
