= Strada (disambiguation) =

Strada means street in Italian, and is a chain of Italian restaurants in the United Kingdom.

Strada may also refer to:

- Strada (surname)
- Fiat Strada, a compact pickup truck
- Mitsubishi Strada. also known as the Mitsubishi Triton, a compact pickup truck
- Bizzarrini Strada, an Italian automobile
- La Strada, a 1954 Italian film
- La Strada (band)
- Cesta, Ajdovščina (known in Italian as Strada), a village in Slovenia
- STRAD alpha, a protein encoded by the gene STRADA

== See also ==
- Strata
