= Magalí Mastaler =

Argentine politician

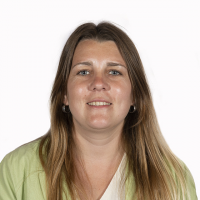

National Deputy
- Incumbent
- Assumed office 10 December 2021
- Constituency: Santa Fe

Personal details
- Born: 19 December 1990 (age 35) Gálvez, Santa Fe, Argentina
- Party: Justicialist Party
- Other political affiliations: Frente de Todos (2019–2023); Union for the Homeland (2023–present)
- Education: Universidad Nacional del Litoral
- Occupation: Social worker

Magalí Mastaler (born 19 December 1990) is an Argentine social worker and politician of the Justicialist Party. Since 2021, she has been a National Deputy elected in Santa Fe Province.

She is a member of La Cámpora.

== Biography ==
Mastaler was born on 19 December 1990 in Gálvez, Santa Fe. She studied to become a social worker at the Universidad Nacional del Litoral (UNL).

== Electoral history ==
Electoral history of Magalí Mastaler
Election	Office	List	#	District	Votes			Result	Ref.
Election	Office	List	#	District	Total	%	P.	Result	Ref.
2021	National Deputy	Frente de Todos	2	Santa Fe	570,498	31.36%	1st (Note: Presented on an electoral list. The data shown represents the share of the vote the entire party/alliance received in that constituency.)	Elected	
