= Leila Chaher =

Argentine politician (born 1984)

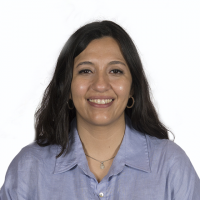
- Leila Chaher

Member of the Chamber of Deputies of Argentina
- Constituency: JUJUY

Personal details
- Born: August 10, 1984 (age 41)
- Party: Union for the Homeland

Leila Chaher is an Argentine politician who is a member of the Chamber of Deputies of Argentina.

== Biography ==
She was elected in 2021.
