= 2025 United States–Argentina currency swap =

Financial assistance package

- Part of 2018–present Argentine monetary crisis
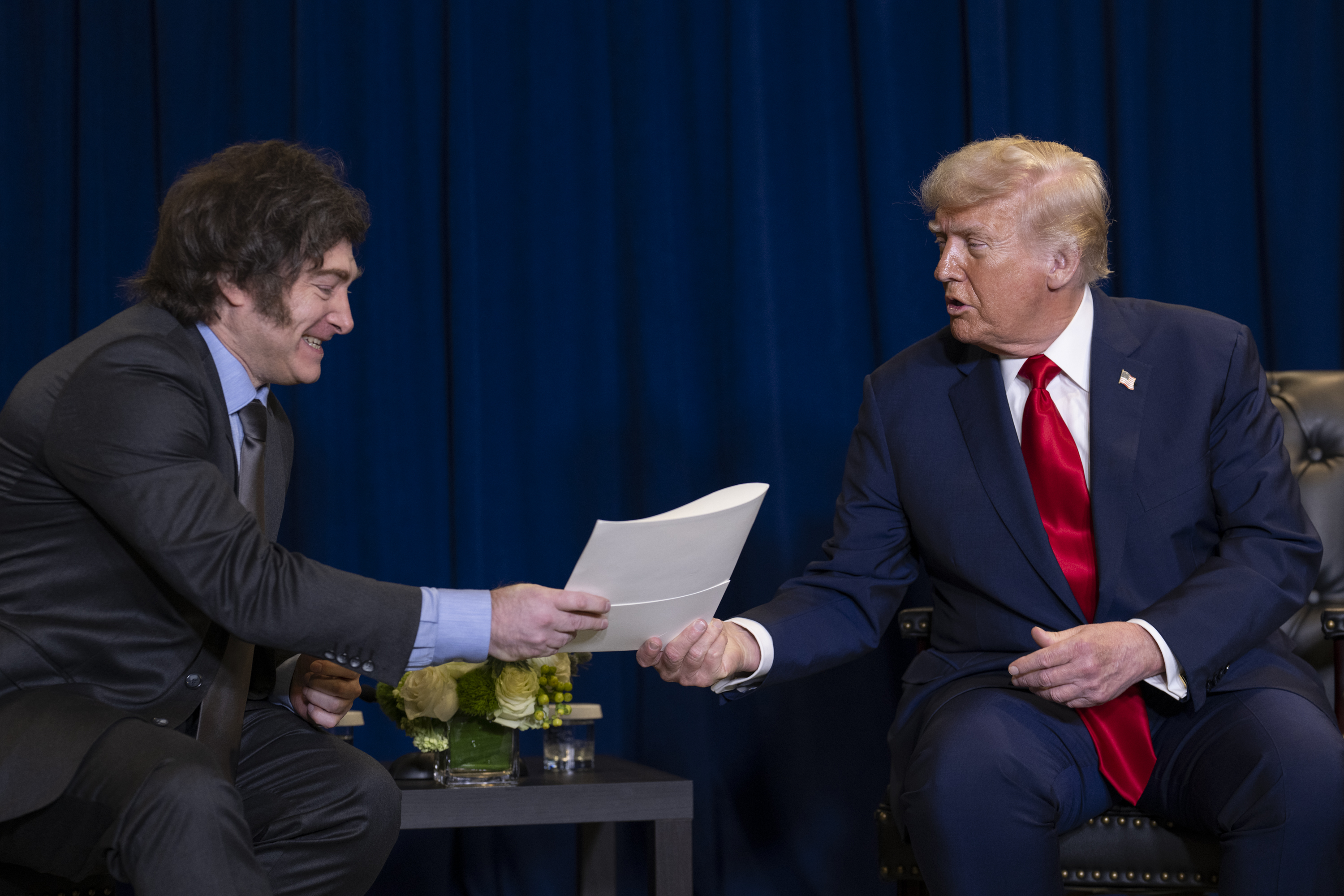
- Argentine President Javier Milei and US President Donald Trump at the UN headquarters in September 2025
- Date: October 9, 2025

On 9 October 2025, United States Treasury Secretary Scott Bessent announced that the United States purchased Argentine pesos and agreed to a currency swap worth 20 billion US dollars, of which only 2.5 billion were used.

== Currency swap ==
During a White House meeting with Argentine president Javier Milei on October 14, US president Donald Trump conditioned the currency swap on the electoral success of Milei's party in the upcoming election. The next day, Bessent told reporters that an additional US$20 billion in financial aid could come for Argentina through sovereign funds and investments from private banks.

On 9 January 2026 Scott Bessent said that Argentina had fully repaid the currency swap and it that generated "tens of millions" in profit for American taxpayers.

== Market response ==
After Trump's October 14 comments, the shares of Argentine companies listed on the New York Stock Exchange dropped by 8.1% at the most before a slight recovery; the Argentine peso depreciated the next day by 0.7% against the US dollar.

== Reaction ==
=== United States ===
Chuck Grassley, the Republican US senator from Iowa, was critical of the bailout, questioning whether Argentina should be bailed out when it was exporting soybeans to China at the disadvantage of American farmers.

=== Argentina ===
On social media, former president Cristina Fernández de Kirchner wrote, "Trump to Milei in the United States: 'Our agreements depend on who wins election.' Argentines ... you already know what to do!". Martín Lousteau, the president of the Radical Civic Union, stated that "nothing good can come of this". In response to Trump's conditioning the bailout on Milei's party's success in the upcoming election, Maximiliano Ferraro, the president of Civic Coalition ARI, said that it was "a blatant act of extortion against the Argentine Nation".
