= Eugenia Alianiello =

Argentine politician and psychologist

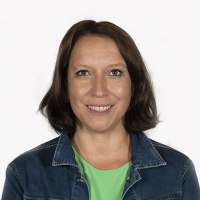

National Deputy
- Incumbent
- Assumed office 10 December 2021
- Constituency: Chubut

Personal details
- Born: 15 December 1980 (age 45)
- Party: Justicialist Party
- Other political affiliations: Frente de Todos (2019–2023); Union for the Homeland (since 2023)
- Occupation: Psychologist

Eugenia Alianiello (born 15 December 1980) is an Argentine politician who is a member of the Chamber of Deputies of Argentina since 2021. Alianiello worked previously as a psychologist.
