= Vanesa Siley =

Argentine trade unionist and politician

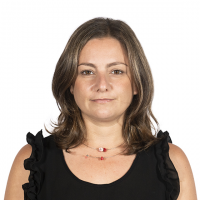

Councillor of Magistracy
- Incumbent
- Assumed office 27 December 2019
- Appointed by: Chamber of Deputies

National Deputy
- Incumbent
- Assumed office 6 December 2017
- Constituency: Buenos Aires

Personal details
- Born: 19 August 1984 (age 41) Mercedes, Buenos Aires Province, Argentina
- Party: Justicialist Party
- Other political affiliations: Unidad Ciudadana (2017–2019); Frente de Todos (2019–present)

Vanesa Raquel Siley (born 19 August 1984) is an Argentine lawyer, trade unionist and politician, currently serving as National Deputy representing Buenos Aires Province. A member of the Justicialist Party, Siley was elected in 2017 for the Unidad Ciudadana coalition, and currently sits in the Frente de Todos bloc.

== Early life and career ==
Siley was born on 19 August 1984 in Mercedes, in Buenos Aires Province. She is a lawyer. She is a member of La Cámpora. Her political career began in the judicial workers' trade union Unión de Empleados Judiciales de la Nación (UJEN); in 2014, she contested the leadership of UJEN leader Julio Piumato, and won in the Buenos Aires section. Following her victory in the Capital, Siley formed the Sindicato de Trabajadores Judiciales (Sitraju), a Buenos Aires–based union.

== Political career ==
Siley ran for a seat in the Argentine Chamber of Deputies in the 2017 legislative election; she was the fourth candidate in the Unidad Ciudadana list in Buenos Aires Province. The Unidad Ciudadana list received 36.28% of the votes, and Siley was elected. She was sworn in on 6 December 2017.

As a national deputy, Siley formed part of the parliamentary commissions on Labour Legislation (which she presides), political trials, justice, general legislation, criminal legislation, and freedom of expression, as well as the permanent bicameral commission on the National Public Ministry. She was a supporter of the 2020 Voluntary Interruption of Pregnancy bill, which legalized abortion in Argentina.

On 27 December 2019, she was sworn in as one of the Chamber of Deputies' representatives in the Council of Magistracy of the Nation. In 2020, she introduced a petition of political trial against Supreme Court of Argentina president Carlos Rosenkrantz.

== Electoral history ==
Electoral history of Vanesa Siley
Election	Office	List	#	District	Votes			Result	Ref.
Election	Office	List	#	District	Total	%	P.	Result	Ref.
2017	National Deputy	Unidad Ciudadana	4	Buenos Aires Province	3,383,114	36.28%	2nd (Note: Presented on an electoral list. The data shown represents the share of the vote the entire party/alliance received in that constituency.)	Elected	
2021	National Deputy	Frente de Todos	7	Buenos Aires Province	3,444,446	38.59%	2nd	Elected	
2025	National Deputy	Fuerza Patria	4	Buenos Aires Province	3,558,527	40.91%	2nd	Elected	
