= Tomás Ledesma =

Argentine politician

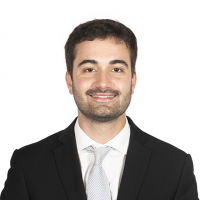

National Deputy
- Incumbent
- Assumed office 10 December 2021
- Constituency: Entre Ríos

Personal details
- Born: 27 December 1994 (age 31) Paraná, Argentina
- Party: Justicialist Party
- Other political affiliations: Frente de Todos (2019–2023); Union for the Homeland (since 2023)
- Occupation: Student

Tomás Ledesma (27 December 1994) is an Argentine politician. A member of the Justicialist Party and La Cámpora, Ledesma was elected as a National Deputy in 2021 in his native Entre Ríos Province.

== Biography ==
Ledesma was born on 27 December 1994 in Paraná, Entre Ríos. He became active in politics as a high school student, joining La Cámpora when he was 15 and becoming a student leader. He is presently a law student at the Universidad Nacional del Litoral (UNL).
