= Ramiro Gutiérrez =

Argentine politician

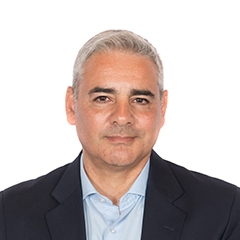

National Deputy
- Incumbent
- Assumed office 10 December 2019
- Constituency: Buenos Aires

Personal details
- Born: 1 April 1967 (age 59)
- Party: Renewal Front
- Other political affiliations: Frente de Todos (2019–2023); Union for the Homeland (since 2023)
- Occupation: lawyer

Carlos Ramiro Gutiérrez (born 1 April 1967) is an Argentine politician and lawyer who is a member of the Chamber of Deputies elected in Buenos Aires Province. He is a member of the Renewal Front.

== Biography ==
Gutiérrez worked as a lawyer before being elected in 2019.
