= Strada (surname) =

Strada is an Italian surname. Notable people with the surname include:

- Alfonsina Strada (1891–1959), Italian cyclist
- Anna Maria Strada, 18th-century Italian soprano
- Gino Strada (1948–2021), surgeon and founder of the humanitarian organization Emergency
- Julia Strada (born 1989), Argentine politician
- Román Strada (born 1987), Argentine footballer
- Vespasiano Strada (1582–1622), Italian painter and engraver
- Vitória Strada (born 1996), Brazilian actress and model
- Zanobi da Strada, 14th-century Italian translator and correspondent of Petrarch
