= Rogelio Iparraguirre =

Argentine politician

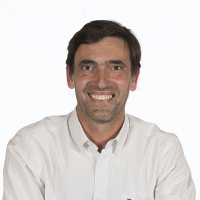

National Deputy
- Incumbent
- Assumed office 10 December 2021
- Constituency: Buenos Aires

Personal details
- Born: 4 January 1978 (age 48) Tandil, Argentina
- Party: Justicialist Party
- Other political affiliations: Unidad Ciudadana (2017–2019); Frente de Todos (2019–2023); Union for the Homeland (since 2023)

Rogelio Iparraguirre (born 4 January 1978) is an Argentine politician who is a member of the Chamber of Deputies of Argentina since 2021.
