= Tanya Bertoldi =

Argentine politician

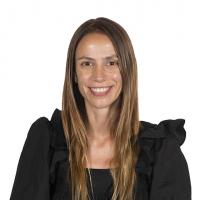

National Deputy
- Incumbent
- Assumed office 10 December 2021
- Constituency: Neuquén

Personal details
- Born: 28 April 1986 (age 39)
- Party: Justicialist Party
- Other political affiliations: Frente de Todos (2019–2023); Union for the Homeland (since 2023)
- Occupation: Architect

Tanya Yanet Bertoldi (born 28 April 1986) is an Argentine politician of the Justicialist Party (PJ). Since 2021, she has been a National Deputy representing Neuquén Province.

== Biography ==
Bertoldi is an architect by profession. She is the niece of Javier Bertoldi, mayor of Centenario, Neuquén. In 2021, she was elected to the Chamber of Deputies.

== Electoral history ==
Electoral history of Tanya Bertoldi
Election	Office	List	#	District	Votes			Result	Ref.
Election	Office	List	#	District	Total	%	P.	Result	Ref.
2021	National Deputy	Frente de Todos	1	Neuquén	66,070	17.37%	3rd (Note: Presented on an electoral list. The data shown represents the share of the vote the entire party/alliance received in that constituency.)	Elected	
