= Emilia Orozco =

Argentine politician (born 1988)

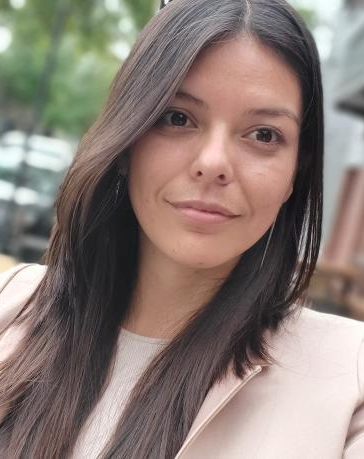
- Orozco in 2021

Member of the Chamber of Deputies
- Incumbent
- Assumed office 10 December 2023
- Constituency: Salta Province

Personal details
- Born: 18 December 1988 (age 37)
- Party: La Libertad Avanza

María Emilia Orozco (born 18 December 1988) is an Argentine politician serving as a member of the Chamber of Deputies since 2023. In the 2025 legislative election, she was elected member of the Senate.
