= Juan Manuel Pedrini =

Argentine politician

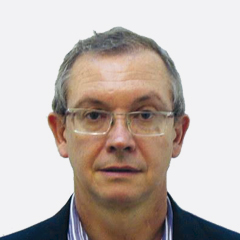

Member of the Chamber of Deputies of Argentina
- Incumbent
- Assumed office 10 December 2021

Personal details
- Born: May 5, 1960 (age 65)
- Party: Union for the Homeland
- Occupation: Public Notary

Juan Manuel Pedrini is an Argentine politician who is a member of the Chamber of Deputies of Argentina.

== Biography ==
He worked as a public notary before he was elected in 2021 for a 4 year term.
