= Bernardo José Herrera =

Argentine politician

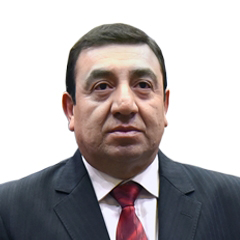

National Deputy
- Incumbent
- Assumed office 4 April 2019
- Constituency: Santiago del Estero

Personal details
- Born: 1 February 1958 (age 68)
- Party: Justicialist Party
- Other political affiliations: Civic Front for Santiago (2005–present); Frente de Todos (2019–2023); Union for the Homeland (2023–present)
- Occupation: Abogado

Bernardo José Herrera (born 1 February 1958) is an Argentine politician who is a member of the Chamber of Deputies of Argentina. A member of the Justicialist Party and the Civic Front for Santiago, he first assumed office in April 2019 replacing Hugo Orlando Infante, who had died. He was later elected in his own right in 2021.

== Biography ==
He worked as a lawyer. He was sworn into office on 4 April 2019 and was sworn into office following the death of incumbent Hugo Orlando Infante. In December 2020, he was diagnosed with COVID-19.

== Electoral history ==
Electoral history of Bernardo José Herrera
Election	Office	List	#	District	Votes			Result	Ref.
Election	Office	List	#	District	Total	%	P.	Result	Ref.
2017	National Deputy	Civic Front for Santiago	2 alt.	Santiago del Estero Province	384,125	70.09%	1st (Note: Presented on an electoral list. The data shown represents the share of the vote the entire party/alliance received in that constituency.)	Not elected (Note: Assumed office on 4 April 2019 following the death of the third candidate on the list, Hugo Orlando Infante.)	
2021	National Deputy	Civic Front for Santiago	2	Santiago del Estero Province	363,144	64.88%	1st	Elected	
