= Brenda Vargas Matyi =

Argentine politician

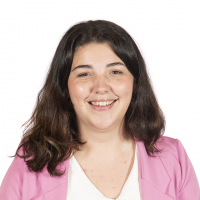

National Deputy
- Incumbent
- Assumed office 10 December 2021
- Constituency: Buenos Aires

Personal details
- Born: 30 May 1994 (age 31)
- Party: Justicialist Party
- Other political affiliations: Union for the Homeland; Frente de Todos

Brenda Vargas Matyi (born 30 May 1994) is an Argentine politician. A member of Union for the Homeland and originally elected for the Frente de Todos, Vargas Matyi has been a member of the Chamber of Deputies of Argentina since 2021, elected in Buenos Aires Province.

== Biography ==
She was elected in 2021.
