= Ana Fabiola Aubone =

Argentine politician

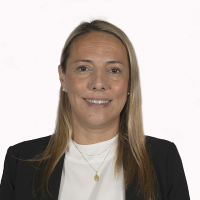

National Deputy
- Incumbent
- Assumed office 10 December 2021
- Constituency: San Juan

Personal details
- Born: 2 May 1977 (age 48)
- Party: Justicialist Party
- Other political affiliations: Frente de Todos (2019–2023); Union for the Homeland (2023–present)

Ana Fabiola Aubone (born 2 May 1977) is an Argentine politician who is a member of the Chamber of Deputies of Argentina. A member of the Justicialist Party, she was elected for the Frente de Todos coalition and currently forms part of Union for the Homeland.

== Biography ==
She worked as a lawyer before she was elected in 2021.
