= María Luisa Chomiak =

Argentine politician

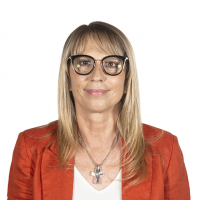

National Deputy
- Incumbent
- Assumed office 10 December 2021
- Constituency: Chaco

Mayor of Charata
- In office 10 December 2015 – 10 December 2021
- Preceded by: Miguel Ángel Tejedor
- Succeeded by: Alejandra Campos

Provincial Deputy of Chaco
- In office 10 December 2011 – 10 December 2015

Personal details
- Born: 22 January 1969 (age 57) Charata, Argentina
- Party: Justicialist Party
- Other political affiliations: Frente de Todos (2019–2023); Union for the Homeland (2023–present)

María Luisa Chomiak (born 22 January 1969) is an Argentine politician. A member of the Justicialist Party, Chomiak was elected in 2021 to the National Chamber of Deputies in Chaco Province. From 2015 to 2021 she was intendenta (mayor) of her hometown, Charata.

== Biography ==
She was elected in 2021.
