= United Provinces (political coalition) =

Argentine political coalition

United Provinces Provincias Unidas
- Abbreviation: PU
- Leader: Maximiliano Pullaro; Martín Llaryora; Gustavo Valdés; Juan Pablo Valdés; Carlos Sadir; Ignacio Agustín Torres; Claudio Vidal; Juan Schiaretti; Florencio Randazzo
- Founded: 6 August 2025
- Preceded by: Juntos por el Cambio (Faction); Hacemos por Nuestro País
- Ideology: Federal Peronism; Federalism
- Political position: Centre to centre-right
- Colours: Orange
- Chamber of Deputies: 18 / 257
- Senate: 3 / 72
- Governors: 6 / 24

Website
- provinciasunidasba.ar

United Provinces (Spanish: Provincias Unidas, PU) is a political coalition in Argentina created to compete in the 2025 legislative election. It comprises the provincial governors of Córdoba, Santa Fe, Corrientes, Jujuy, Chubut and Santa Cruz.
