= Alejandro Fargosi =

Argentine lawyer and politician

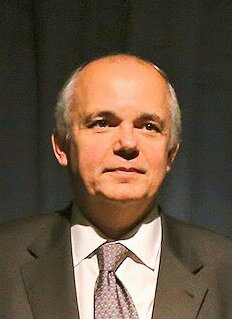
- Fargosi in October 2021

National Deputy
- Incumbent
- Assumed office 10 December 2025
- Constituency: City of Buenos Aires

Personal details
- Born: 28 November 1954 (age 71)
- Party: La Libertad Avanza
- Education: University of Buenos Aires

Alejandro Fargosi is an Argentine lawyer and politician.

Fargosi is the member of the Argentine Chamber of Deputies for Buenos Aires.

Fargosi received an honorary degree from the University of Buenos Aires in 1976.
