= Adolfo Bermejo =

Argentine politician

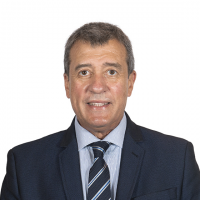

Member of the Chamber of Deputies of Argentina
- Incumbent
- Assumed office 9 October 2021
- Constituency: Mendoza

Personal details
- Born: November 29, 1960 (age 65)
- Party: Frente de Todos

Adolfo Bermejo is an Argentine politician who is a member of the Chamber of Deputies of Argentina.

== Biography ==
He worked in marketing before being elected in 2021.
