= Germán Martínez (Argentine politician) =

Argentine politician

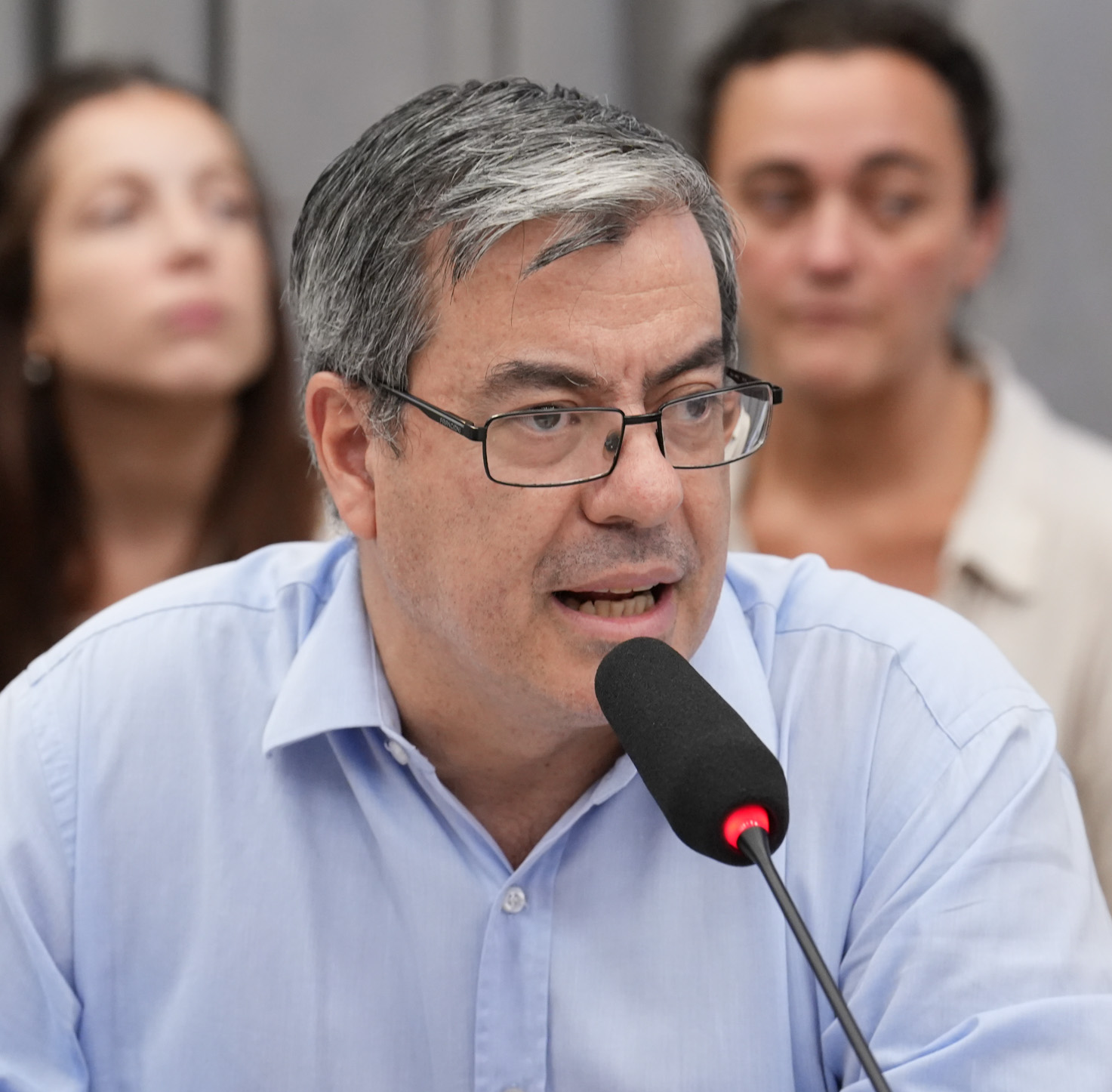
- Martínez in 2025

National Deputy
- Incumbent
- Assumed office 10 December 2019
- Constituency: Santa Fe

Personal details
- Born: 22 February 1975 (age 51) Rosario, Argentina
- Party: Justicialist Party
- Other political affiliations: Front for Victory (2003–2017); Unidad Ciudadana (2017–2019); Frente de Todos (2019–2023); Union for the Homeland (2023–present)
- Education: National University of Rosario

Germán Pedro Martínez (born 22 February 1975) is an Argentine politician who has been a National Deputy elected for in Santa Fe since 2019. A member of the Justicialist Party, Martínez worked as a legislative aide for Agustín Rossi and Guillermo Carmona from 2005 to his own election to the Chamber of Deputies.

From 2022 to 2023, he was president of the Frente de Todos parliamentary bloc. Since 2023, he has presided the Union for the Homeland bloc.

== Early life ==
Martínez was born on 22 February 1975 in Rosario. He has a licenciatura degree on Political Science from the National University of Rosario, which he earned in 1999. Early in his career, from 1994 to 2003, he was an auxiliary teacher at Colegio Salesiano San José, a private Catholic school in Rosario, and later worked as a project manager at the Institución Salesiana Nuestra Señora del Rosario in Funes.

== Political career ==
Early in his career, Martínez was active in a Christian youth organisation. In 2005, he became a legislative aide at the National Chamber of Deputies for Santa Fe deputy Agustín Rossi, of the Front for Victory. Martínez would form a longstanding association with Rossi, serving in his office until Rossi's hiatus from Congress in 2013. From 2015 to 2017, Martínez worked as an aide for Mendoza deputy Guillermo Carmona. He would later return to Rossi's office when the latter was once again elected to the lower house in 2017.

Martínez also briefly served as undersecretary of administrative coordination at the Ministry of Defense during Rossi's time as defense minister, in the presidency of Cristina Fernández de Kirchner.

=== National Deputy ===
In the 2019 legislative election, Martínez ran for one of Santa Fe's seats in the Chamber of Deputies in his own right, as the fourth candidate in the Frente de Todos list. The Frente de Todos came second in the general election, with 42.26% of the vote, enough for Martínez to make it past the D'Hondt cut and be elected.

As a national deputy, Martínez formed part of the parliamentary commissions on Industry, National Defense, Freedom of Expression, Petitions and Powers, Budgets and Finances, Addiction Prevention, Education, and Tax Norm Auditing. He also served as first vice president of the National Defense Commission. He was a supporter of the legalisation of abortion in Argentina, voting in favour of the 2020 Voluntary Interruption of Pregnancy Bill.

In February 2022, he was elected president of the Frente de Todos parliamentary bloc following the resignation of Máximo Kirchner from the position due to disagreements regarding the 2022 deal between Argentina and the International Monetary Fund.

== Personal life ==
Martínez is married to Carla María Morasso and has two children.

== Electoral history ==
Electoral history of Germán Martínez
Election	Office	List	#	District	Votes			Result	Ref.
Election	Office	List	#	District	Total	%	P.	Result	Ref.
2019	National Deputy	Frente de Todos	3	Santa Fe Province	890,561	42.26%	2nd (Note: Presented on an electoral list. The data shown represents the share of the vote the entire party/alliance received in that constituency.)	Elected	
2023	National Deputy	Union for the Homeland	1	Santa Fe Province	584,589	29.10%	2nd	Elected	
