= Victoria Borrego =

Argentine politician

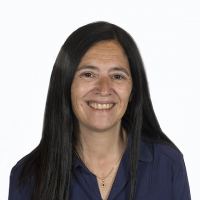

National Deputy
- Incumbent
- Assumed office 10 December 2021
- Constituency: Buenos Aires

Personal details
- Born: 4 December 1968 (age 57)
- Party: Civic Coalition ARI
- Other political affiliations: Juntos por el Cambio (2015–2023)
- Occupation: Lawyer

Victoria Borrego (born 4 December 1968) is an Argentine politician who is a member of the Chamber of Deputies of Argentina since 2021, elected in Buenos Aires Province. She is a member of the Civic Coalition ARI.

== Biography ==
Borrego worked as a lawyer. She was elected in 2021.
