= Hacemos Federal Coalition =

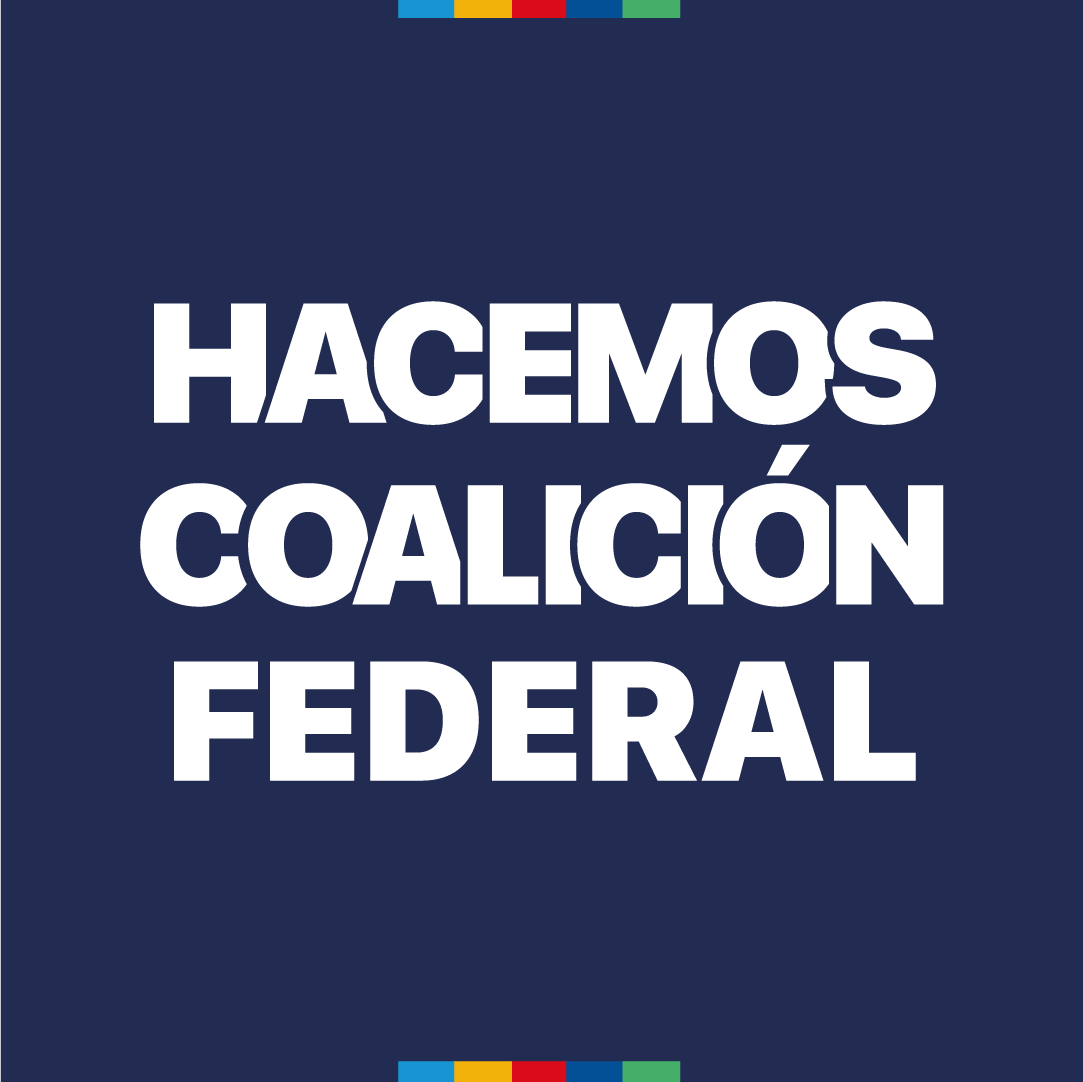
- Abbreviation: HCF
- Leader: Miguel Pichetto
- Founded: 27 December 2023
- Dissolved: 10 December 2025
- Ideology: Pragmatism; Federal Peronism; Factions: Socialism; Liberalism
- Political position: Centre-right
- Chamber of Deputies: 31 / 257

Hacemos Federal Coalition (Spanish: Hacemos Coalición Federal) was a big tent parliamentary faction in the Argentine Congress, composed of legislators from various parties. As of 2024, the HCF held 31 seats in the Chamber of Deputies, a majority of whom were elected on the Hacemos por Nuestro País ballot line.

The HCF is a pragmatist alliance, with its members' ideologies ranging from socialism to liberalism. A part of the "dialoguist" opposition, in 2024, the HCF played a crucial role in passing president Javier Milei's "Ley de Bases" reform package.

== Member parties ==
- Hacemos por Nuestro País (Hacemos, Socialist Party, etc.)
- Federal Innovation
- Civic Coalition ARI
- Neuquén People's Movement
