= Juan Carlos Polini =

Argentine politician

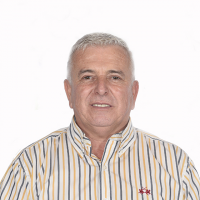

Member of the Chamber of Deputies of Argentina
- Incumbent
- Assumed office 10 December 2019
- Constituency: Chaco

Personal details
- Born: 29 March 1943 (age 83)
- Party: Radical Civic Union
- Occupation: Accountant

Juan Carlos Polini is an Argentine politician who is a member of the Chamber of Deputies of Argentina.

== Biography ==
Polini worked as an accountant before he was elected in 2019.
