= Gabriela Pedrali =

Argentine politician

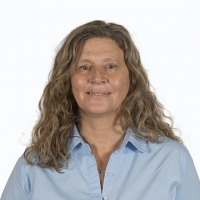

National Deputy
- Incumbent
- Assumed office 10 December 2021
- Constituency: La Rioja

Personal details
- Born: 2 February 1964 (age 62)
- Party: Justicialist Party
- Other political affiliations: Frente de Todos (2019–2023); Union for the Homeland (since 2023)
- Spouse: Ricardo Quintela (separated)

Gabriela Pedrali (born 2 February 1964) is an Argentine politician who is a member of the Chamber of Deputies of Argentina.

== Biography ==
Pedrali was elected in 2021. She was married to Ricardo Quintela, the governor of La Rioja Province, and is the mother of five children.

== Electoral history ==
Electoral history of Gabriela Pedrali
Election	Office	List	#	District	Votes			Result	Ref.
Election	Office	List	#	District	Total	%	P.	Result	Ref.
2021	National Deputy	Frente de Todos	1	La Rioja	100,055	56.16%	1st (Note: Presented on an electoral list. The data shown represents the share of the vote the entire party/alliance received in that constituency.)	Elected	
