= Eduardo Toniolli =

Argentina politician

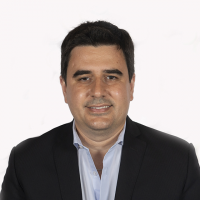

Member of the Chamber of Deputies of Argentina
- Incumbent
- Assumed office 10 December 2021
- Constituency: Santa Fe

Personal details
- Born: 17 March 1977 (age 49)
- Party: Frente de Todos
- Occupation: University Professor

Eduardo Toniolli is an Argentine politician and professor who is a member of the Chamber of Deputies of Argentina representing Santa Fe since 2021.
