= Manuel Ignacio Aguirre =

Argentine politician

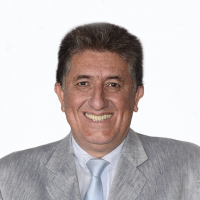

Member of the Chamber of Deputies of Argentina
- Constituency: Corrientes

Personal details
- Born: 31 March 1959 (age 67)
- Party: Radical Civic Union
- Occupation: Lawyer

Manuel Ignacio Aguirre is an Argentine politician who is a member of the Chamber of Deputies of Argentina.

== Biography ==
Aguirre worked as a lawyer before his election in 2021.
