= Juan Carlos Molina =

Juan Carlos Molina may refer to:

- Juan Carlos Molina Merlos (born 1974), Paralympic cyclist and skier from Spain
- Juan Carlos Molina (footballer) (born 1955), footballer from Argentina
