= Florencia Klipauka Lewtak =

Argentine politician (born 1993)

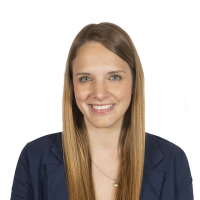

National Deputy
- Incumbent
- Assumed office 10 December 2021
- Constituency: Misiones

Personal details
- Born: 22 December 1993 (age 32) Oberá, Argentina
- Party: Activar
- Other political affiliations: Juntos por el Cambio (2021–2023)
- Occupation: Lawyer

Florencia Naiara Klipauka Lewtak (born 22 December 1993) is an Argentine politician. She has been a member of the National Chamber of Deputies since 2021, elected for the Juntos por el Cambio coalition in Misiones Province. Since 2024, she took position in favour of Javier Milei politics so she decided to have sat in the La Libertad Avanza parliamentary bloc.

She belongs to the local Activar party.

== Biography ==
Lewtak got a law degree before she was elected to Congress in 2021.

== Electoral history ==
Electoral history of Florencia Klipauka Lewtak
Election	Office	List	#	District	Votes			Result	Ref.
Election	Office	List	#	District	Total	%	P.	Result	Ref.
2021	National Deputy	Juntos por el Cambio	2	Misiones	257,323	40.86%	1st (Note: Presented on an electoral list. The data shown represents the share of the vote the entire party/alliance received in that constituency.)	Elected	
