= Gerardo Milman =

Argentine politician (born 1966)

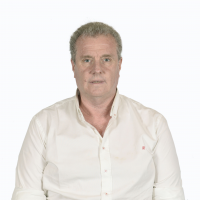

Member of the Chamber of Deputies of Argentina
- Incumbent
- Assumed office 10 December 2021
- Constituency: Buenos Aires

Personal details
- Born: 21 September 1966 (age 59)
- Occupation: Security

Gerardo Milman is an Argentine politician who is a member of the Chamber of Deputies of Argentina.

== Biography ==
Milman worked in the security industry before he was elected in 2021.
