= Natalia de la Sota =

Argentine politician (born 1975)

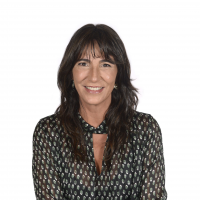

National Deputy
- Incumbent
- Assumed office 21 December 2021
- Constituency: Córdoba

Personal details
- Born: 14 September 1975 (age 50)
- Party: Justicialist Party
- Other political affiliations: We Do for Córdoba; Hacemos por Nuestro País
- Occupation: Professor

Natalia de la Sota (born 14 September 1975) is an Argentine politician, currently serving as a National Deputy elected in Córdoba Province since 2021. She is the daughter of former Córdoba governor José Manuel de la Sota. Like her father, she is a member of the Justicialist Party and the provincial We Do for Córdoba coalition.

== Early life ==
She is the daughter of José Manuel de la Sota and granddaughter of Arturo Zanichelli, both of whom were governors of Córdoba. A native of Córdoba, de la Sota dedicated herself to music and cultural outreach as a teacher before entering politics at age 40.

== Political career ==
At the public level, she was Director of the Office of Institutional Affairs in the Government of Córdoba between 2011 and 2015, councilor of the City of Córdoba between 2015 and 2019, and Provincial Legislator between 2019 and 2021, having been elected to that position in the 2019 provincial elections for the at-large Single District.

She was elected National Deputy of Argentina for Córdoba in the 2021 legislative elections, in first place on the We Do for Córdoba list.

In the 2025 legislative elections she renewed her seat in the Chamber of Deputies once again, under the "Defendamos Córdoba" banner, taking a stance opposed to the government of Javier Milei, at odds with kirchnerism, and distancing herself from the Córdoba governor, Martín Llaryora. In the election she garnered 170,837 votes, that is, 8.75%, securing her renewal in the lower house of the Argentine Congress.
