= Constanza Alonso =

Argentine politician

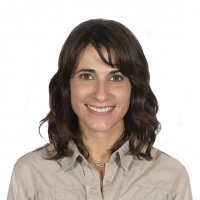
Constanza Alonso in 2021.

Constanza María "Coty" Alonso (born 2 February 1986) is an Argentine politician who sits in the Argentine Chamber of Deputies for the Justicialist Party.
