= Marcela Antola =

Argentine politician

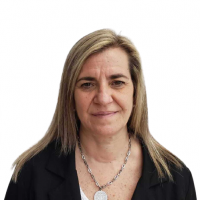

National Deputy
- Incumbent
- Assumed office 10 December 2021
- Constituency: Entre Ríos

Personal details
- Born: 2 November 1964 (age 61)
- Party: Radical Civic Union
- Other political affiliations: Juntos por el Cambio (2021–2023)
- Occupation: Businesswoman

Marcela Antola (born 2 November 1964) is an Argentine politician who has been a member of the Chamber of Deputies of Argentina since 2021, elected in Entre Ríos Province. She is a member of the Radical Civic Union (UCR).

== Biography ==
Antola worked as a businesswoman before elected in 2021.
