= Julia Strada =

Argentine politician (born 1989)

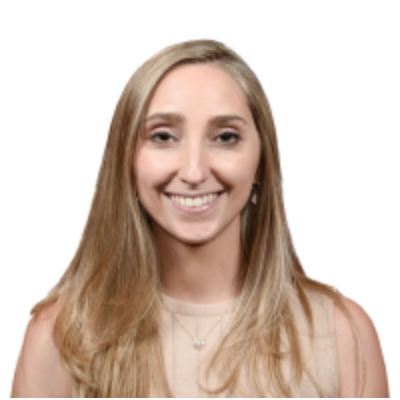
- Strada in 2023

National Deputy
- Incumbent
- Assumed office 10 December 2023
- Constituency: Buenos Aires

Personal details
- Born: 26 May 1989 (age 37)
- Party: Justicialist Party
- Parent: Aldo Strada (father)

Julia Strada Rodríguez (born 26 May 1989) is an Argentine politician serving as a member of the Chamber of Deputies since 2023, elected in Buenos Aires Province. She is a member of the Justicialist Party. From 2021 to 2023, she served as director of the Banco de la Nación Argentina.

A political science graduate from the National University of Rosario, Strada counts with a PhD in economic development from the National University of Quilmes and is a professor of economics at the University of Buenos Aires.

== Electoral history ==
Electoral history of Natalia Zaracho
| Election | Office | List | # | District | Votes | | | Result | Ref. |
| Election | Office | List | # | District | Total | % | P. | Result | Ref. |
|---|---|---|---|---|---|---|---|---|---|
| 2023 | National Deputy | Union for the Homeland | 14 | Buenos Aires Province | 4,094,665 | 43.71% | 1st (Note: Presented on an electoral list. The data shown represents the share of the vote the entire party/alliance received in that constituency.) | Elected | |
