= Liliana Paponet =

Argentine politician

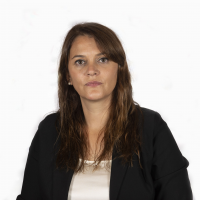

Member of the Chamber of Deputies of Argentina
- Constituency: Mendoza

Personal details
- Born: 3 October 1978 (age 47)
- Party: Frente de Todos
- Occupation: Accountant

Liliana Paponet is an Argentine politician and accountant who is a member of the Chamber of Deputies of Argentina representing Mendoza since 2021.
