= Protector Political Force =

Protector Political Force Protectora Fuerza Política
- President: José Luis Ramón
- Founded: 8 April 2017
- Ideology: Social democracy Participatory democracy Consumer protection Social market economy
- Political position: Centre-left
- National affiliation: Homeland Force (since 2023)
- Colours: Green, red
- Seats in the Chamber of Deputies: 0 / 257
- Seats in the Senate: 0 / 72
- Province Governors: 0 / 24
- Seats in the Legislature of Mendoza: 1 / 86

Website
- https://protectorafuerzapolitica.org.ar

The Protector Political Force (Spanish: Protectora Fuerza Política), also commonly known as Protectora, is a political party in Argentina. Their primary scope of action is the Mendoza Province. Its ideology is based on a conception of social market economy.

== History ==
Protectora was recognized by the electoral Justice on 8 April 2017. It gets its name from the National Protective Consumer Defense Association, an NGO founded by a group of citizens, among whom is José Luis Ramón in 1994 to promote informed participation of consumer users. It ran in the 2017 legislative elections in coalition with the Intransigent Party (PI) and the Más Fe Party.

The coalition campaigned focusing on proposing a political force whose main objective is to participate in the Government of Mendoza. At that time, they participated in numerous complaints against the government of Mauricio Macri (of the Cambiemos alliance, also pro-government at the provincial level with Alfredo Cornejo as governor). One of the main issues of complaint was the increase (called "tarifazo") of household gas from the network and from bottles; holding rallies in several cities in the province using blankets on their shoulders, in the so-called "March of the Blankets". Finally, the list of the Intransigent Party, under which Protectora and Más Fe were presented, obtained 17.21% of the votes, resulting in Ramón being elected national deputy, for fifth place and displacing the Workers' Left Front (FIT-U) of its position behind the alliances led by the Justicialist Party (PJ) and the Radical Civic Union (UCR). Likewise, Protectora's alliance with the Intransigent Party obtained 3 seats in the Chamber of Senators of the Province of Mendoza and 3 seats in the Chamber of Deputies of the Province of Mendoza, becoming the third largest parliamentary bloc in both chambers of the Mendoza legislature.

After Ramón's inauguration, on 10 December 2017, Protectora joined the "Social Democratic Bloc" in the Chamber of Deputies along with Martín Lousteau and Carla Carrizo, from the City of Buenos Aires, and Teresita Villavicencio, from Tucumán Province. However, Ramón withdrew from the block on 12 June 2018 after the controversy caused by the proclamation and issuance of his vote during the debate on the Voluntary Interruption of Pregnancy Law in 2018.

In the 2019 provincial elections, Protectora presented Ramón as a candidate for governor with provincial deputy Mario Vadillo as running mate, without making alliances with other parties.
