= Gabriela Besana =

Argentine politician

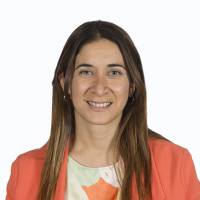

National Deputy
- Incumbent
- Assumed office 10 December 2021
- Constituency: Buenos Aires

Personal details
- Born: 7 June 1981 (age 44)
- Party: Republican Proposal
- Occupation: Lawyer

Gabriela Besana (born 7 June 1981) is an Argentine politician who is a member of the Chamber of Deputies of Argentina, elected in Buenos Aires Province.

== Biography ==
Besana worked as a lawyer before she was elected in 2021.
