= María Sotolano =

Argentine politician

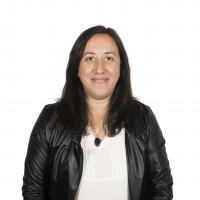

Member of the Chamber of Deputies of Argentina
- Incumbent
- Assumed office 10 December 2021
- Constituency: Buenos Aires

Personal details
- Born: 15 April 1982 (age 44)
- Party: Republican Proposal
- Occupation: Functionary

María Sotolano (born 15 April 1982) is an Argentine politician who is a member of the Chamber of Deputies of Argentina.
