= Varinia Marín =

Argentine politician

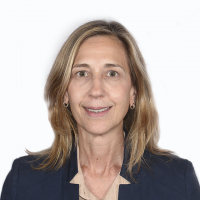

National Deputy
- Incumbent
- Assumed office 10 December 2021
- Constituency: La Pampa

Personal details
- Born: 23 February 1968 (age 58) General Pico, Argentina
- Party: Justicialist Party
- Other political affiliations: Frente de Todos (2019–2023); Union for the Homeland (since 2023)

Varinia Lis Marín (born 23 February 1968) is an Argentine lawyer and politician of the Justicialist Party. Since 2021, she has served as a National Deputy elected in La Pampa Province.

== Biography ==
Marín was born on 23 February 1968 in General Pico, La Pampa Province. She is the daughter of former La Pampa governor Rubén Marín. She studied law at the University of Buenos Aires, graduating in 1995.
