= Francisco Monti =

Argentine politician

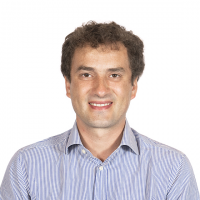

National Deputy
- Incumbent
- Assumed office 10 December 2021
- Constituency: Catamarca

Personal details
- Born: 22 May 1984 (age 41)
- Party: Radical Civic Union
- Occupation: Lawyer

Francisco Monti (born 22 May 1984) is an Argentine politician who is a member of the Chamber of Deputies of Argentina, elected in Catamarca Province, since 2021.

== Biography ==
Monti worked as a lawyer before he was elected in 2021.
