= Martín Tetaz =

Argentine economist and politician

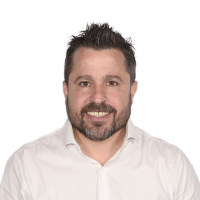

National Deputy
- Incumbent
- Assumed office 10 December 2021
- Constituency: City of Buenos Aires

Personal details
- Born: 20 December 1974 (age 51) La Plata, Argentina
- Party: Radical Civic Union
- Other political affiliations: Juntos por el Cambio (2021–present)
- Education: National University of La Plata

Martín Alberto Tetaz (born 20 December 1974) is an Argentine economist and politician, and a National Deputy since 2021.

== Early life and career ==
Tetaz was born on 20 December 1974 in La Plata, son of a bookkeeper and a law professor. He grew up in General Madariaga. He studied economics at the National University of La Plata, graduating in 2001, and later taught there. After graduation he moved to Gillingham, England, where he worked at a pizzeria. He also began a post-graduate degree on cognitive psychology, but dropped out before completing it.

== Political career ==
Tetaz's political involvement began in Franja Morada, the Radical Civic Union (UCR)'s student wing. In July 2021, he announced his candidacy for National Deputy as part of the Juntos por el Cambio coalition, of which the UCR forms part.

In the 2021 legislative election, Tetaz was the second candidate in the Juntos por el Cambio list in Buenos Aires, behind María Eugenia Vidal. With 47.09% of the vote, Juntos por el Cambio was the most voted alliance in the city, more than enough for Tetaz to make it past the D'Hondt cut and be elected. He was sworn in on 4 December 2021, and began his mandate on 10 December 2021.
