= Fabio Quetglas =

Argentine politician

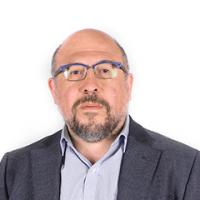

Member of the Chamber of Deputies of Argentina
- Incumbent
- Assumed office 10 December 2021
- Constituency: Buenos Aires

Personal details
- Born: May 6, 1965 (age 60)
- Party: Radical Civic Union
- Occupation: University Professor

Fabio Quetglas is an Argentine politician who is a member of the Chamber of Deputies of Argentina.

== Biography ==
He worked as a university professor before his election in 2021.
