= Sergio Palazzo =

Argentine politician

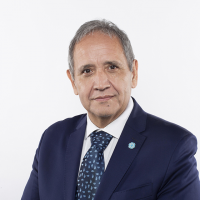

National Deputy
- Incumbent
- Assumed office 10 December 2021
- Constituency: Buenos Aires

Personal details
- Born: 5 April 1962 (age 64)
- Party: Justicialist Party
- Other political affiliations: Union for the Homeland; Frente de Todos

Sergio Palazzo (born 5 April 1962) is an Argentine politician, banker and union leader who is a member of the Chamber of Deputies of Argentina since 2021, elected in Buenos Aires Province. Since 2009 he has been Secretary General of Asociación Bancaria, the bank workers' union.

== Biography ==
Palazzo was a banker before being elected to the Chamber of Deputies in 2021.
