= Ana Clara Romero =

Argentine politician

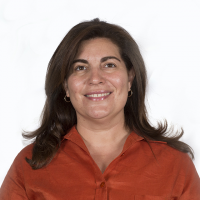

National Deputy
- Incumbent
- Assumed office 10 December 2021
- Constituency: Chubut

Personal details
- Born: 10 January 1979 (age 47)
- Party: Republican Proposal
- Occupation: Lawyer

Ana Clara Romero (born 10 January 1979) is an Argentine politician. Since 2021, she has served as a National Deputy elected in Chubut Province. She belongs to the Republican Proposal (PRO) party.

== Biography ==
She worked as a lawyer before her election in 2021.
