= Gabriela Brouwer de Koning =

Argentine politician

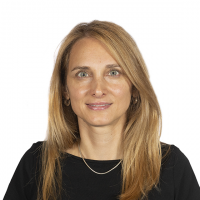

Member of the Chamber of Deputies of Argentina
- Incumbent
- Assumed office 10 December 2019
- Constituency: Cordoba

Personal details
- Born: 17 November 1980 (age 45)
- Party: Evolution Radical
- Occupation: Lawyer

Gabriela Brouwer de Koning is an Argentine politician who is a member of the Chamber of Deputies of Argentina.

== Biography ==
Brouwer de Koning worked as a lawyer before she was elected in 2021.
