= Marilú Quiroz =

Politician in Argentina

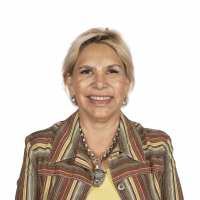

Member of the Chamber of Deputies of Argentina
- Incumbent
- Assumed office 10 December 2021
- Constituency: Chaco

Personal details
- Born: June 20, 1957 (age 68)
- Party: Republican Proposal
- Occupation: Tourism businesswoman

Marilú Quiroz is an Argentine politician who is a member of the Chamber of Deputies of Argentina. She is known for promoting pseudoscience in Congress.

== Biography ==
She worked in tourism before she was elected in 2021.
