= Julio César Pereyra =

Argentinian politician (born 1951)

Julio César Pereyra (born 1951 in Gualeguaychú) is the mayor of Florencio Varela, Buenos Aires, Argentina (since 2003).

He is a member of the Justicialist Party and a strong supporter of President Cristina Fernández de Kirchner.

He is president of the Federation of Argentine Municipalities (FAM) since 2003 and the Federation of Latin American Cities, Municipalities and Associations (FLACMA) since 2005. Pereyra is shortlisted for 2008 World Mayor.
