= Florencia De Sensi =

Argentine politician

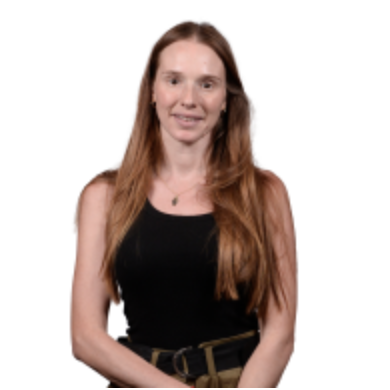

Member of the Argentine Chamber of Deputies
- Incumbent
- Assumed office 10 December 2023
- Constituency: Buenos Aires Province

Personal details
- Born: 22 January 1988 (age 38)
- Party: Republican Proposal

María Florencia De Sensi (born 22 January 1988) is an Argentine politician who has been a member of the Argentine Chamber of Deputies since 2023.

== See also ==
- List of Argentine deputies, 2023–2025
