= Gabriel Chumpitaz =

Argentine politician

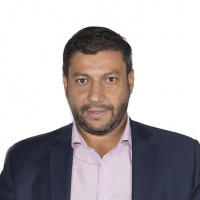

National Deputy
- Incumbent
- Assumed office 10 December 2021
- Constituency: Santa Fe

Provincial Deputy of Santa Fe
- In office 10 December 2019 – 10 December 2021

Personal details
- Born: 8 May 1976 (age 49) Rosario, Argentina
- Party: Republican Proposal
- Other political affiliations: Juntos por el Cambio (2015–2023)

Gabriel Felipe Chumpitaz (born 8 May 1976) is an Argentine politician who is a member of the Chamber of Deputies of Argentina.
