= Patricia Holzman =

Patricia Noemi Holzman
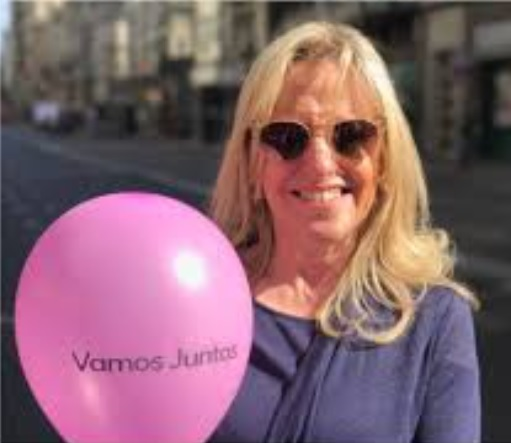
- Holzman in Buenos Aires, 2025.

National Deputy
- Incumbent
- Assumed office 10 December 2025
- Constituency: City of Buenos Aires

Personal details
- Born: November 9, 1965 (age 60)
- Party: La Libertad Avanza
- Occupation: Public accountant

Patricia Noemi Holzman (born 9 November 1965) is an Argentine public accountant and politician. Since 2025 she has served as a national deputy for the Autonomous City of Buenos Aires in the La Libertad Avanza bloc. She previously served as Chief of the Advisory Cabinet under then–Minister of the Environment Sergio Bergman (2015–2019), holding the rank and status of secretary.

== Professional and political career ==
In December 2015 she was appointed Chief of the Advisory Cabinet of the Ministry of Environment and Sustainable Development, then headed by Sergio Bergman, with the rank of secretary. During that administration she headed the General Coordination Unit and took part in federal environmental policy activities, such as the presentation of the ForestAR 2030 initiative to provincial environmental officials.

Holzman had previously been affiliated with the PRO party during her tenure at the Ministry of Environment. After leaving the Executive Branch at the end of Mauricio Macri's administration, she held leadership positions in the nonprofit sector linked to the Fundación Judaica. In 2025 she joined La Libertad Avanza and was selected for the second position on its list of candidates for national deputy for the Autonomous City of Buenos Aires, behind Alejandro Fargosi, which secured her election. On 10 December 2025 she took office as a national deputy and joined the bloc's parliamentary caucus.

Holzman has also been active in community volunteer work, including involvement in the founding of the Arlene Fern Community School and in the Fundación Judaica network, as well as with the civic organization Argentina Ciudadana. In 2025 she was appointed by the La Libertad Avanza bloc to represent the Buenos Aires city legislature on the Urban and Environmental Plan Council (COPUA).

=== Legislative activity ===
Holzman serves as a member of the Chamber of Deputies' Culture Committee (Comisión de Cultura).

In March 2026, Holzman authored a bill to amend Law 24,660 on the enforcement of custodial sentences, seeking to prohibit the possession, use, or introduction of mobile or wireless communication devices in penitentiary facilities. She also co-signed a bill establishing controls on the medical use of propofol to prevent misuse and adverse events. In February 2026, she voted in favor of the labor modernization bill, which passed the Chamber of Deputies 135–115.

== Ministry of Environment tenure controversies ==
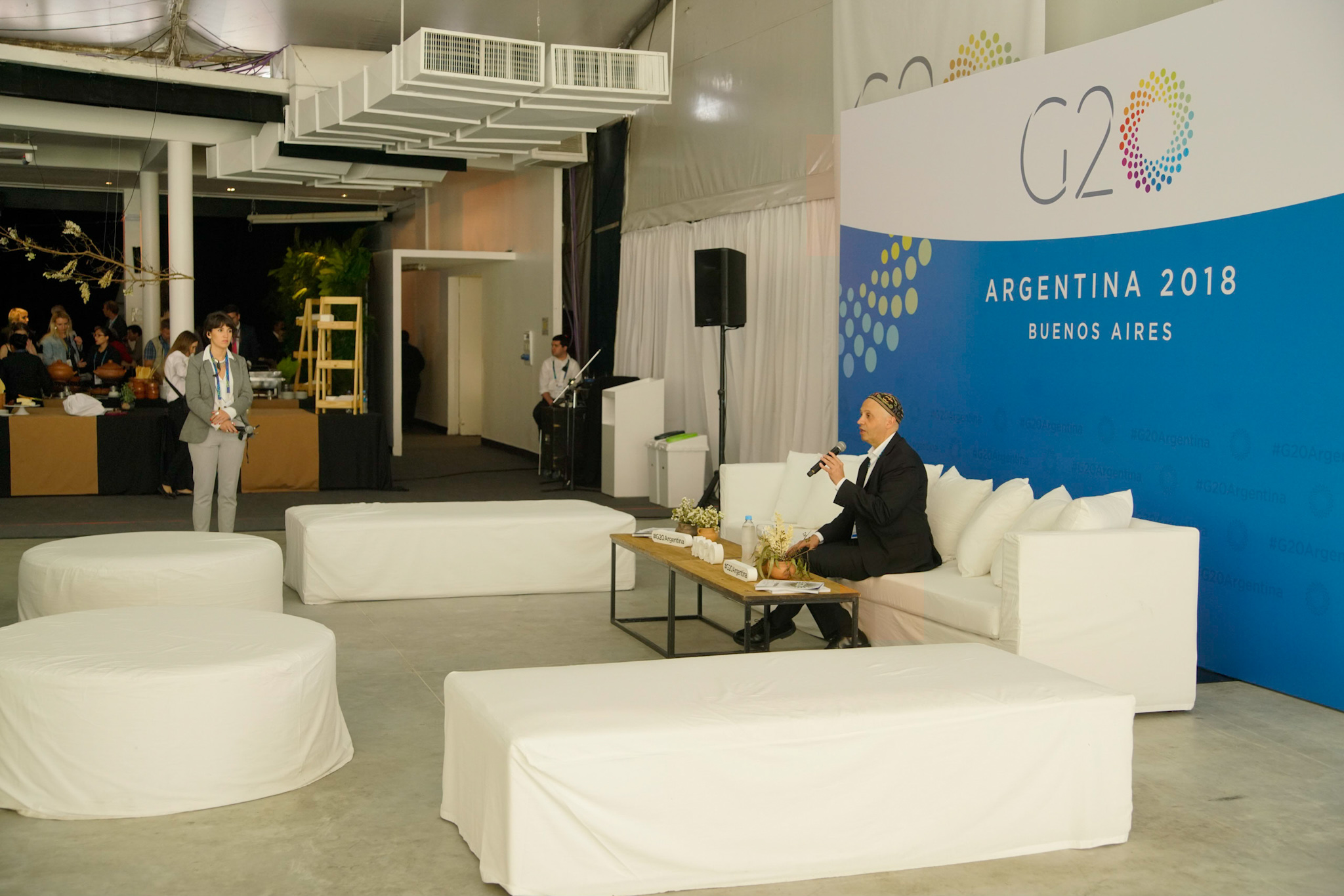
Sergio Bergman at a press conference during his tenure as minister (2018).

In January 2017 a judicial case was opened to investigate alleged irregularities in contracts related to the National Fire Management Plan. According to the complaint, Holzman, then Chief of the Advisory Cabinet, had notified the company Air En Services of the approval of its bid for helicopter rental under a "legítimo abono" arrangement while a public tender process was still underway, and despite the company reportedly lacking authorization from Argentina's civil aviation authority (ANAC).

During the environmental administration in which Holzman held senior positions, cooperation agreements were signed with the Centro de Estudios Desarrollo Técnico (CEDyAT), a Technology Liaison Unit recognized under Law 23,877, for tasks involving the digitization of files and document modernization under Decree 434/2016, which established the State Modernization Plan.

During her time as Chief of the Advisory Cabinet and head of the General Coordination Unit of the ministry led by Sergio Bergman, the department faced union criticism over staff layoffs carried out in 2017 and 2018. Labor organizations denounced the dismissals and demanded reinstatements; in coverage of the dispute, Página/12 identified Holzman as one of the officials most influential in those administrative decisions.

== See also ==
- Sergio Bergman
- La Libertad Avanza
- Argentine Chamber of Deputies
