= Carlos Raúl Zapata =

Argentine politician

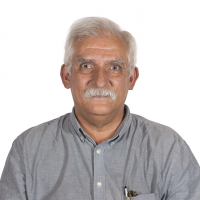

National Deputy
- Incumbent
- Assumed office 10 December 2021
- Constituency: Salta

Personal details
- Born: 30 January 1957 (age 69)
- Party: Ahora Patria
- Occupation: Certified Public Accountant

Carlos Raúl Zapata (born 30 January 1957) is an Argentine politician who is a member of the Chamber of Deputies of Argentina elected in Salta Province.

== Biography ==
He was born to two parents who were journalists. He was elected in 2021.
