= Aníbal Tortoriello =

Argentine politician

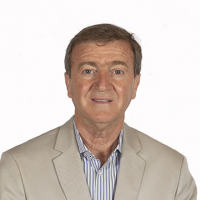

National Deputy
- Incumbent
- Assumed office 10 December 2021
- Constituency: Río Negro Province

Mayor of Cipolletti
- In office 10 December 2015 – 10 December 2019
- Preceded by: Abel Baratti
- Succeeded by: Claudio Di Tella

Personal details
- Born: 24 December 1958 (age 67)
- Party: Republican Proposal
- Occupation: Business

Aníbal Tortoriello (born 24 December 1958) is an Argentine politician of Republican Proposal (PRO). Since 2021, he has been a National Deputy elected in Río Negro Province. From 2015 to 2019, he was intendente (mayor) of Cipolletti.

In 2023, he unsuccessfully ran for governor of Río Negro, losing against Alberto Weretilneck.

== Electoral history ==
=== Executive ===
Electoral history of Martín Soria
Election	Office	List	Votes			Result	Ref.
Election	Office	List	Total	%	P.	Result	Ref.
2015	Mayor of Cipolletti	Civic Coalition ARI	24,194	56.62%	1st	Elected	
2019	Mayor of Cipolletti	Republican Proposal	17,208		2nd	Not elected	
2023	Governor of Río Negro	Cambia Río Negro	86,660	23.86%	2nd	Not elected	

=== Legislative ===
Electoral history of Aníbal Tortoriello
Election	Office	List	#	District	Votes			Result	Ref.
Election	Office	List	#	District	Total	%	P.	Result	Ref.
2021	National Deputy	Juntos por el Cambio	1	Río Negro Province	102,579	27.21%	2nc (Note: Presented on an electoral list. The data shown represents the share of the vote the entire party/alliance received in that constituency.)	Elected	
