= Pamela Calletti =

Argentine politician (born 1979)

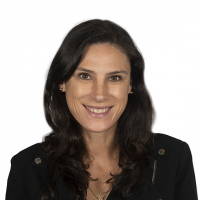

National Deputy
- In office 10 December 2021 – 10 December 2025
- Constituency: Salta

Personal details
- Born: 3 March 1979 (age 47) Salta, Argentina
- Party: Justicialist Party
- Other political affiliations: Frente de Todos (2019–2023); Federal Innovation (since 2023)

Pamela Calletti (born 3 March 1979) is an Argentine politician. She served as a National Deputy of Argentina, elected in Salta Province. A member of the Justicialist Party, she led the Innovación Federal parliamentary group in the Chamber of Deputies.

== Biography ==
Before 2021, she was Minister of Human Rights and Justice (2015–2017) and State Prosecutor for the province of Salta (2017–2019). She was elected to the Chamber of Deputies in 2021.

== Electoral history ==
Electoral history of Pamela Calletti
Election	Office	List	#	District	Votes			Result	Ref.
Election	Office	List	#	District	Total	%	P.	Result	Ref.
2021	National Deputy	Frente de Todos	1	Salta	205,853	32.81%	1st (Note: Presented on an electoral list. The data shown represents the share of the vote the entire party/alliance received in that constituency.)	Elected	
