= Agustina Propato =

Argentine politician

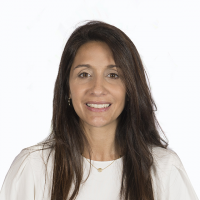

National Deputy
- Incumbent
- Assumed office 10 December 2021
- Constituency: Buenos Aires

Personal details
- Born: June 25, 1982 (age 44)
- Party: Justicialist Party
- Other political affiliations: Frente de Todos
- Spouse: Sergio Berni

Agustina Propato (born 25 June 1982) is an Argentine politician who is a member of the Chamber of Deputies of Argentina.

== Biography ==
She was a lawyer who was elected in 2021. She is married to former Buenos Aires Province security minister Sergio Berni.
