= Fuerza Patria =

Argentine political coalition

Homeland Force Fuerza Patria
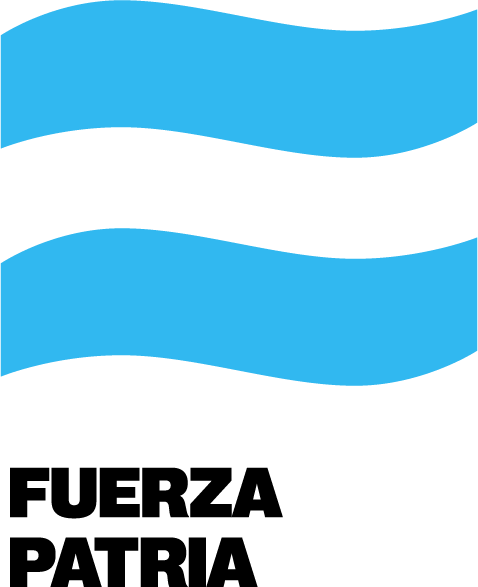
- Alternative name: Union for the Homeland; Spanish: Unión por la Patria (until 2025)
- Abbreviation: FP; UxP
- Leaders: Cristina Fernández de Kirchner; Axel Kicillof
- Senate leader: Juliana Di Tullio (UC); José Mayans (FNyP)
- Chamber of Deputies leader: Germán Martínez
- Founded: 14 June 2023
- Preceded by: Everyone's Front
- Ideology: Peronism; Kirchnerism; Progressivism; Anti-neoliberalism; Left-wing populism Left-wing nationalism Factions: Communism; Federal Peronism; Socialism of the 21st century
- Political position: Centre-left to left-wing
- Colours: Blue White Yellow (Argentine national colours)
- Slogan: La patria sos vos. Vamos a defenderla. ('You are the Homeland. Let's defend it.')
- Chamber of Deputies: 93 / 257
- Senate: 25 / 72
- Governors: 7 / 24

Website
- fuerzapatria.org
- Politics of Argentina; Political parties; Elections; A: The coalition has also been described as big tent. It is formed by parties ranging from the left to right. However, it is predominantly centre-left and left-wing (Kirchnerism), with minor centre-right and centrist factions.

The Homeland Force (Spanish: Fuerza Patria, FP), also known as the Union for the Homeland (Spanish: Unión por la Patria, UP or UxP) until 2025, is a centre-left to left-wing political and electoral coalition of Peronist political parties in Argentina. It has been the main opposition coalition since December 2023.

The coalition was formed to compete in the 2023 general election, and is a successor to the previous Everyone's Front coalition, whose candidate in the 2019 presidential election, Alberto Fernández, was successfully elected President of Argentina. The coalition is centred on the Justicialist Party and its allies both on the federal and provincial levels, including the Renewal Front of Sergio Massa, who was the coalition's unsuccessful candidate for president in the 2023 presidential election.

== History ==
=== Background ===
In the run-up to the 2019 presidential election, the Kirchnerist faction of the Justicialist Party arranged for the establishment of a common Peronist electoral front. This project ultimately materialized with the formation of the Frente de Todos coalition, which comprised the Justicialist majority along with a number of other parties of the political left and centre. This alliance was itself a successor to both the short-lived Citizen's Unity bloc formed for the 2017 midterm elections as well as the Front for Victory, which served as the political instrument of the Kirchnerist political camp between 2003 and 2017. The alliance presented Alberto Fernández as its sole candidate in the 2019 presidential primaries, in which he secured just under 48% of the vote.

In the subsequent general election, Fernández again garnered 48% of the vote, against the 40% of incumbent president Mauricio Macri of the Juntos por el Cambio coalition, ousting the sitting administration and returning the Peronists to power after four years in the opposition. Fernández, along with his vice president, the former President of Argentina Cristina Fernández de Kirchner, went on to govern the country for the ensuing four-year period. Halfway through this term, the Frente de Todos coalition suffered a significant defeat in the 2021 Argentine legislative election, losing seats in both the Chamber of Deputies and the Senate, and thereby losing control of Congress for the first time in nearly 40 years.

=== 2023 election ===
In April 2023, President Alberto Fernandez announced that he would not seek re-election in the next presidential election. In the primary elections in August of that year, Sergio Massa defeated Juan Grabois by a margin of nearly 16 percentage points, although it became the worst result for a ruling Peronist coalition since the PASO was first implemented in 2009.

Logo as Union for the Homeland

In the runoff in November 2023, Libertarian candidate Javier Milei defeated Massa in the second round with 55.65% of the vote, the highest percentage since Argentina's transition to democracy. Massa conceded defeat shortly before the official results were published.

=== 2025 elections ===
In July 2025, Union for the Homeland was renamed to Homeland Force (Spanish: Fuerza Patria). The new name was proposed by the leader of the Justicialist Party, Cristina Fernández de Kirchner.

In the 2025 Buenos Aires provincial election held in September, Fuerza Patria won 47% of the popular vote, while the ruling La Libertad Avanza won 34% of the vote, trailing the Peronist coalition by 13 percentage points. The result was considered a "landslide defeat" for Milei's administration. Fuerza Patria was led by the left-wing Governor of Buenos Aires Province Axel Kicillof in the election, who has been seen as "the new face of Peronism" ever since his victory.

The margin of Fuerza Patria's victory was considered surprising, as the ruling coalition was expected to lose only narrowly. Analysts expected La Libertad Avanza to lose by a few points to the Peronists. Fuerza Patria has since used its power to obstruct Milei's austerity policies and increase social spending. As Buenos Aires makes up over 40% of Argentina's voters, the result was seen as a good omen for the Peronist coalition in the October 2025 Argentine legislative election.

Despite the success in the Buenos Aires provincial election, the coalition failed to win the 2025 Argentine legislative election, as the party of president Milei, La Libertad Avanza, finished first and won over 40% of the popular vote, beating expectations and polls which anticipated Milei's bloc to win about 30% of the popular vote instead. In turn, Fuerza Patria won about 34% of the vote, finishing as distant second. While La Libertad Avanza massively expanded the number of its seats, the Peronist camp stayed stagnant - the coalition managed to maintain its 98 seats in the Chamber of Deputies (by defending its 46 seats that were up for election), but lost 12 of its senators, reducing its amount of seats in the Senate from 34 to 22.

== Ideology ==
Fuerza Patria is a Peronist and Kirchnerist coalition. The coalition is centre-left to left-wing on the political spectrum, with minor Federal Peronist, right-wing, centrist, and non-Peronist leftist parties. It includes communist factions, socialists, left-wing and also right-wing populists, as well as Catholic and progressive parties. It postulates four political banners, based on Peronism and Kirchnerism: national sovereignty, social justice, state intervention to fight wealth inequality, and greater integration of Latin American countries against "foreign interference".

The party has been described as "left-wing wealth redistributive", labourist and nationalist, as well as economically interventionist and anti-neoliberal. The coalition has extensive ties with the trade union General Confederation of Labour, and positions itself against neoliberalism and austerity. The coalition advocates anti-neoliberal and redistributive policies, along with financial sovereignty, based on rejecting the IMF; it considers the IMF to be Argentina's "public enemy". Fuerza Patria is considered Peronist, and left-wing populist in character. The main policy of the coalition is expanding the role of the state in the economy through progressive and redistributive policies, to secure the Peronist ideal of social justice.

The coalition strongly favours stronger economic and political ties with China, and denounced the Milei administration's relationship with the United States, including the $40 billion bailout agreement with US president Donald Trump, which Union for the Homeland decried as a form of economic dependency. In the wake of the 2024 Venezuelan presidential election, Fuerza Patria rejected the declaration that accused Nicolás Maduro of committing electoral fraud. All other major Argentine coalitions - the Civic Coalition ARI, Republican Proposal, and La Libertad Avanza - signed the declaration, and declared Edmundo González Urrutia the legitimate victor. Fuerza Patria also rejects the UNHRC and OAS reports that allege human rights violations in Venezuela and FSLN-led Nicaragua. In October 2025, Jorge Taiana, the coalition's leading candidate for national deputy in the Buenos Aires Province, denied that Venezuela is a dictatorship, and argued that it is a "flawed democracy" instead.

In June 2025, the coalition attempted to impeach President Milei for declaring Iran the "enemy of Argentina", and for declaring Argentina's support for Israel and the United States. The coalition criticized Israel in the Gaza War, denouncing Israeli military occupation of Gaza Strip and calling for Israeli Prime Minister Benjamin Netanyahu to be "declared persona non grata" in Argentina. In response to the Russo-Ukrainian War, it declared that it "intends to maintain a normal relationship with Russia".

== Member parties ==
Party	Leader	Ideology	Position
Justicialist Party	Cristina Fernández de Kirchner	Peronism	Centre-left to left-wing
Renewal Front	Sergio Massa	Federal Peronism	Centre
Party of Culture, Education, and Labour	Hugo Moyano	Peronism; Labourism	Centre-left
Kolina	Alicia Kirchner	Kirchnerism	Left-wing
Victory Party	Diana Conti	Social democracy Kirchnerism	Centre-left to left-wing
New Encounter	Martín Sabbatella	Progressivism	Centre-left to left-wing
Somos	Victoria Donda	Socialist feminism	Left-wing
Proyecto Sur	Jorge Selser	Progressivism	Centre-left
Broad Front	Adriana Puiggrós	Kirchnerism; Social democracy Peronism	Centre-left to left-wing
Solidary Party	Carlos Heller	Co-operatism; Socialism	Left-wing
Popular Unity	Víctor De Gennaro	Socialism of the 21st century Left-wing nationalism	Left-wing
National Alfonsinist Movement	Leopoldo Moreau	Social democracy K Radicalism	Centre-left
FORJA	Gustavo Fernando López	Social democracy K Radicalism	Centre-left
Communist Party	Jorge Kreyness	Communism; Marxism–Leninism; Guevarism	Far-left
Communist Party (Extraordinary Congress)	Pablo Pereyra	Communism; Marxism–Leninism	Far-left
Revolutionary Communist Party	Juan Carlos Alderete	Communism; Marxism–Leninism–Maoism	Far-left
Piquetero Party (Note: It is not officially registered as a political party, but Marino himself maintains that he is the leader of the "Piquetero Party" and "Piquetero Unity", these being members of the Frente de Todos until 2023, and of Unión por la Patria since June 2023.)	Juan Marino	Communism; Trotskyism	Far-left
Intransigent Party	Enrique Gustavo Cardesa	Democratic socialism	Left-wing
Patria Grande Front	Juan Grabois	Socialism of the 21st century Feminism; Kirchnerism	Left-wing
La Patria de los Comunes	Emilio Pérsico	Kirchnerism	Left-wing
Protector Political Force	José Luis Ramón	Social democracy	Centre-left
Federal Commitment	Alberto Rodríguez Saá	Peronism	Centre
Conservative People's Party	Marco Michelli	Conservatism	Right-wing

== Election results ==
=== Presidential elections ===
Election year	Candidate	First round		Second round		Result
Election year	Candidate	Votes	%	Votes	%	Result
2023	Sergio Massa	9,853,492	36.78 (#1)	11,598,720	44.35 (#2)	Lost

=== Legislative elections ===
==== Chamber of Deputies ====
Election year	Leader	Votes	%	Seats won	+/–	Position
2023	Germán Martínez	9,298,491	37.88	58 / 130	▲8	Opposition
2025	Germán Martínez	7,741,775	33.81	47 / 127	▼11	Opposition

==== Senate ====
Election year	Leader	Votes	%	Seats won	+/–	Position
2023	José Mayans	5,076,244	43.72	13 / 24	▲4	Opposition
2025	José Mayans	1,911,002	36.62	9 / 24	▼4	Opposition
