= 2021 Argentine legislative election =

- 14 November 2021
- Chamber of Deputies
- 127 of the 257 seats in the Chamber of Deputies
- Turnout: 71.39%
Party	Vote %	Seats
Juntos por el Cambio	42.13	61
Frente de Todos	34.17	50
Libertarians	7.23	4
Workers' Left Front	5.53	4
Vamos con Vos–Federal Consensus	5.51	4
Front for the Renewal of Concord	0.98	1
Together We Are Río Negro	0.60	1
Neuquén People's Movement	0.47	1
SER Santa Cruz	0.20	1
This lists parties that won seats. See the complete results below.
- Senate
- 24 of the 72 seats in the Senate
- Turnout: 70.83%
Party	Vote %	Seats
Juntos por el Cambio	46.88	14
Frente de Todos	28.12	9
Vamos con Vos–Federal Consensus	11.29	1
This lists parties that won seats. See the complete results below.
- Maps
Results by province

Legislative elections were held in Argentina on 14 November 2021. Half of the seats in the Chamber of Deputies and a third of the seats in the Senate were renewed. The election had previously been scheduled to take place on 24 October 2021, but was postponed due to the COVID-19 pandemic in Argentina.

Open, Simultaneous and Mandatory Primaries (PASO) were previously scheduled to take place on 8 August 2021, but took place on 12 September 2021, having also been postponed due to COVID-19. There were proposals, backed by the ruling Frente de Todos, to scrap the primaries altogether due to the COVID-19 pandemic. The proposals were opposed by the Juntos por el Cambio opposition. In June 2021, it was agreed to reschedule the primaries alongside the general election instead.

127 of the 257 seats in the lower chamber were renewed, while eight provinces (Catamarca, Chubut, Córdoba, Corrientes, La Pampa, Mendoza, Santa Fe, and Tucumán) each renewed their 3 senators, in total accounting for 24 out of 72 seats in the upper chamber.

The main opposition alliance, Together for Change, was seen as the big winner of the election. The governing Frente de Todos suffered big losses, losing its majority in the Senate for the first time in almost 40 years, and seeing defeats in stronghold provinces such as Buenos Aires and La Pampa. Observers attributed the loss to the widespread anger over high inflation and rising poverty.

== Background ==
Both executive and legislative offices were renewed in 2019 in Argentina; both elections were won by the Frente de Todos, a new coalition formed by a number of Peronist and Kirchnerist parties and alliances (chiefly the Justicialist Party and the Renewal Front) to support the presidential ticket of Alberto Fernández and former President Cristina Fernández de Kirchner (now Vice President). The Frente de Todos coalition won 64 out of 130 seats up for grabs in the lower house in the last election, thus currently accounting for 120 seats in the 2019–2021 period – 9 seats short of a majority.

The second minority and largest force in the opposition is the coalition formed to support former president Mauricio Macri: Juntos por el Cambio (formed by, among others, Republican Proposal, the Radical Civic Union and the Civic Coalition ARI), which won 56 seats in the Chamber of Deputies in 2019 and presently has 115 seats, following defections from its inter-bloc.

=== Impact of the COVID-19 pandemic ===
As early December 2020, the impact of the COVID-19 pandemic in Argentina prompted discussions on whether the 2021 elections, as well as the Open, Simultaneous and Mandatory Primaries (PASO) should be delayed and rescheduled. A majority of provincial governors (both from the governing Frente de Todos as well as from opposition parties), initially suggested scrapping the PASO primaries altogether. The Juntos por el Cambio-led opposition in Congress, however, opposed the measure and introduced a bill to forbid the national government from cancelling the primaries. The national executive, led by President Alberto Fernández, initially supported the measure, but later reached an agreement with Juntos por el Cambio to reschedule both the primaries and the legislative election for a month later. The new electoral calendar was published on 4 August 2021: the PASO primaries, originally scheduled for 8 August 2021, were rescheduled for 11 September 2021, while the legislative election, originally scheduled for 24 October 2021, were rescheduled for 14 November 2021.

In order to hold both elections, in which the all citizens between the ages of 18 and 70 are legally obligated to vote, the government and the National Electoral Chamber established a safety protocol which included a 30% increase of voting places and the vaccination of all electoral authorities. In addition, those who may exhibit COVID-19 symptoms or were in close contact with a positive case may be exempt from voting.

== Electoral system ==
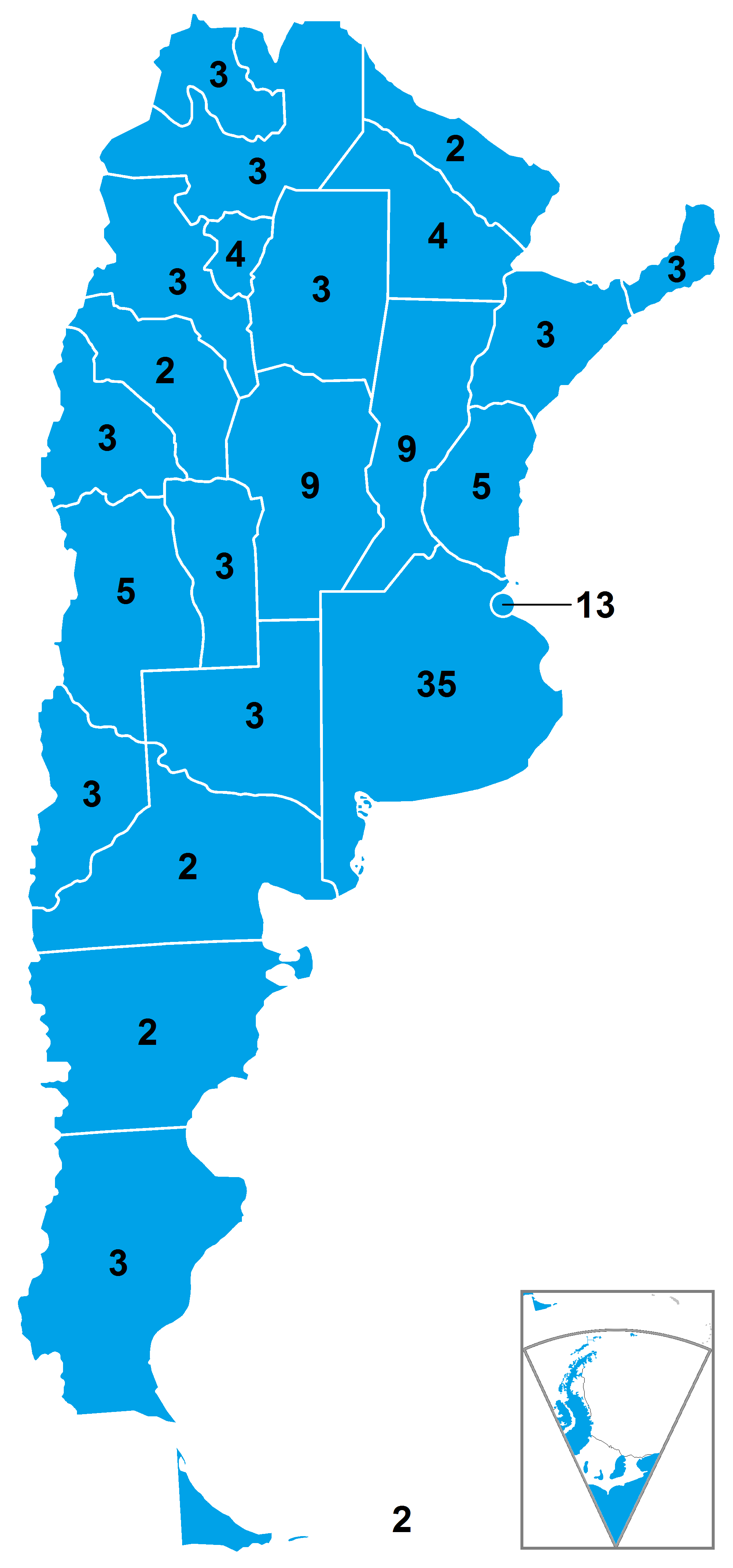
Number of Deputies at stake in each district.

Provinces that elected Senators in blue.

=== Chamber of Deputies ===
The 257 members of the Chamber of Deputies are elected by proportional representation in 24 multi-member constituencies based on the provinces (plus the City of Buenos Aires). Seats are allocated using the d'Hondt method with a 3% electoral threshold. In this election, 127 of the 257 seats are up for renewal for a four-year term.

Province	Seats	Seats at stake
Buenos Aires	70	35
City of Buenos Aires	25	13
Catamarca	5	3
Chaco	7	4
Chubut	5	2
Córdoba	18	9
Corrientes	7	3
Entre Ríos	9	5
Formosa	5	2
Jujuy	6	3
La Pampa	5	3
La Rioja	5	2
Mendoza	10	5
Misiones	7	3
Neuquén	5	3
Río Negro	5	2
Salta	7	3
San Juan	6	3
San Luis	5	3
Santa Cruz	5	3
Santa Fe	19	9
Santiago del Estero	7	3
Tierra del Fuego	5	2
Tucumán	9	4
Total	257	127

Outgoing deputies
Province	Deputy	Party
Buenos Aires	Juan Aicega	PRO
Buenos Aires	Pablo Miguel Ansaloni	Federal Unity and Equity
Buenos Aires	Hernán Berisso	PRO
Buenos Aires	Claudia Bernazza	Frente de Todos
Buenos Aires	Eduardo "Bali" Bucca	Frente de Todos
Buenos Aires	Adriana Cáceres	PRO
Buenos Aires	Marcela Campagnoli	Civic Coalition
Buenos Aires	Javier Campos	Civic Coalition
Buenos Aires	Walter Correa	Frente de Todos
Buenos Aires	José Ignacio de Mendiguren	Frente de Todos
Buenos Aires	Héctor Fernández	Frente de Todos
Buenos Aires	Carlos Alberto Fernández	UCR
Buenos Aires	Ezequiel Fernández Langan	PRO
Buenos Aires	Héctor "Toty" Flores	Civic Coalition
Buenos Aires	Juan Carlos Giordano	Socialist Left–Left Front
Buenos Aires	Marcelo Koenig	Frente de Todos
Buenos Aires	Mónica Macha	Frente de Todos
Buenos Aires	Martín Nicolás Medina	PRO
Buenos Aires	Josefina Mendoza	UCR
Buenos Aires	Leopoldo Raúl Guido Moreau	Frente de Todos
Buenos Aires	María Graciela Ocaña	PRO
Buenos Aires	María Carla Piccolomini	PRO
Buenos Aires	Fabio José Quetglas	UCR
Buenos Aires	Nicolás Rodríguez Saá	Frente de Todos
Buenos Aires	Laura Russo	Frente de Todos
Buenos Aires	Jorge Sarghini	Federal Consensus
Buenos Aires	Mónica Leticia Schlotthauer	Socialist Left–Left Front
Buenos Aires	María Liliana Schwindt	Frente de Todos
Buenos Aires	Magdalena Sierra	Frente de Todos
Buenos Aires	Vanesa Siley	Frente de Todos
Buenos Aires	Mirta Tundis	Frente de Todos
Buenos Aires	Romina Uhrig	Frente de Todos
Buenos Aires	Fernanda Vallejos	Frente de Todos
Buenos Aires	Natalia Soledad Villa	PRO
Buenos Aires	Hugo Yasky	Frente de Todos
City of Buenos Aires	Ana Carla Carrizo	UCR
City of Buenos Aires	Gabriela Cerruti	Frente de Todos
City of Buenos Aires	Álvaro Héctor de Lamadrid	UCR
City of Buenos Aires	Jorge Ricardo Enríquez	PRO
City of Buenos Aires	Alejandro García	PRO
City of Buenos Aires	Carlos Salomón Heller	Frente de Todos
City of Buenos Aires	Fernando Adolfo Iglesias	PRO
City of Buenos Aires	Juan Manuel López	Civic Coalition
City of Buenos Aires	Gisela Marziotta	Frente de Todos
City of Buenos Aires	Paula Mariana Oliveto Lago	Civic Coalition
City of Buenos Aires	José Luis Patiño	PRO
City of Buenos Aires	Carmen Polledo	PRO
City of Buenos Aires	Facundo Suárez Lastra	UCR
Catamarca	Eduardo Segundo Brizuela del Moral	Civic and Social Front of Catamarca
Catamarca	Silvana Micaela Ginocchio	Frente de Todos
Catamarca	Dante Edgardo López Rodríguez	Frente de Todos
Chaco	Aída Beatriz Máxima Ayala	UCR
Chaco	Juan Mosqueda	Frente de Todos
Chaco	Elda Pértile	Frente de Todos
Chaco	Alicia Terada	Civic Coalition
Chubut	Gustavo Menna	UCR
Chubut	Rosa Rosario Muñoz	Frente de Todos
Córdoba	Brenda Lis Austin	UCR
Córdoba	Héctor Baldassi	PRO
Córdoba	María Soledad Carrizo	UCR
Córdoba	Pablo Carro	Frente de Todos
Córdoba	Paulo Leonardo Cassinerio	Federal Córdoba
Córdoba	Gabriel Alberto Frizza	PRO
Córdoba	Claudia Gabriela Márquez	Federal Córdoba
Córdoba	Diego Matías Mestre	UCR
Córdoba	Alejandra María Vigo	Federal Córdoba
Corrientes	Sofía Brambilla	PRO
Corrientes	Estela Mercedes Regidor Belledone	UCR
Corrientes	Jorge Antonio Romero	Frente de Todos
Entre Ríos	Atilio Francisco Salvador Benedetti	UCR
Entre Ríos	Mayda Cresto	Frente de Todos
Entre Ríos	Alicia Fregonese	PRO
Entre Ríos	Ana Carolina Gaillard	Frente de Todos
Entre Ríos	Jorge Enrique Lacoste	UCR
Formosa	Mario Horacio Arce	UCR
Formosa	Gustavo Ramiro Fernández Patri	Frente de Todos
Jujuy	María Gabriela Burgos	UCR
Jujuy	José Luis Martiarena	Frente de Todos
Jujuy	Osmar Antonio Monaldi	PRO
La Pampa	Melina Aida Delú	Frente de Todos
La Pampa	Martín Maquieyra	PRO
La Pampa	Ariel Rauschenberger	Frente de Todos
La Rioja	Danilo Adrián Flores	Frente de Todos
La Rioja	Julio Enrique Sahad	PRO
Mendoza	Omar Chafí Félix	Frente de Todos
Mendoza	Claudia Najul	UCR
Mendoza	Luis Alfonso Petri	UCR
Mendoza	José Luis Ramón	Federal Unity and Equity
Mendoza	Federico Raúl Zamarbide	UCR
Misiones	Flavia Morales	Misiones Front for Concord
Misiones	Luis Mario Pastori	UCR
Misiones	Alfredo Oscar Schiavoni	PRO
Misiones	Ricardo Wellbach	Misiones Front for Concord
Neuquén	Alma Liliana "Chani" Sapag	Neuquén People's Movement
Neuquén	David Pablo Schlereth	PRO
Neuquén	Carlos Alberto Vivero	Frente de Todos
Río Negro	Lorena Matzen	UCR
Río Negro	Ayelén Spósito	Frente de Todos
Salta	Alcira Elsa Figueroa	Frente de Todos
Salta	Martín Federico Grande Durand	PRO
Salta	Miguel Andrés Costas Zottos	Justicialist
San Juan	Walberto Enrique Allende	Frente de Todos
San Juan	Eduardo Augusto Cáceres	PRO
San Juan	Alejandro Francisco Guevara Olivera	Frente de Todos
San Luis	Karim Augusto Alume Sbodio	Frente de Todos
San Luis	José Luis Riccardo	UCR
San Luis	Victoria Rosso	Frente de Todos
Santa Cruz	Antonio José Carambia	Federal Action
Santa Cruz	Roxana Nahir Reyes	UCR
Santa Cruz	Juan Benedicto Vázquez	Frente de Todos
Santa Fe	Esteban Mateo Bogdanich	Frente de Todos
Santa Fe	Luis Gustavo Contigiani	Progressive, Civic and Social Front
Santa Fe	Gonzalo Pedro Antonio del Cerro	UCR
Santa Fe	Josefina Victoria Tosetto González	Frente de Todos
Santa Fe	Luciano Andrés Laspina	PRO
Santa Fe	María Lucila Lehmann	Civic Coalition
Santa Fe	Patricia Mónica Mounier	Frente de Todos
Santa Fe	Gisela Scaglia	PRO
Santiago del Estero	Norma Amanda Abdala de Matarazzo	Frente de Todos
Santiago del Estero	Bernardo José "Pepe" Herrera	Frente de Todos
Santiago del Estero	María Luisa Montoto de Rogel	Frente de Todos
Tierra del Fuego	Héctor Antonio Stefani	PRO
Tierra del Fuego	Inés Carolina Yutrovic	Frente de Todos
Tucumán	Beatriz Luisa Ávila	Party for Social Justice
Tucumán	José Manuel Cano	UCR
Tucumán	Gladys Medina	Frente de Todos
Tucumán	Pablo Raúl Yedlin	Frente de Todos

=== Senate ===
The 72 members of the Senate are elected in the same 24 constituencies, with three seats in each. The party receiving the most votes in each constituency wins two seats, with the third seat awarded to the second-placed party. The 2021 elections will see one-third of Senators renewed, with eight provinces electing three Senators; Catamarca, Chubut, Córdoba, Corrientes, La Pampa, Mendoza, Santa Fe and Tucumán.

Outgoing senators
Province	Deputy	Party
Catamarca	Inés Imelda Blas	Frente de Todos
Catamarca	Oscar Aníbal Castillo	Civic and Social Front of Catamarca
Catamarca	Dalmacio Mera Figueroa	Frente de Todos
Chubut	Nancy Susana González	Frente de Todos
Chubut	Alfredo Héctor Luenzo	Frente de Todos
Chubut	Juan Mario Pais	Frente de Todos
Córdoba	Carlos Alberto Caserio	Frente de Todos
Córdoba	Ernesto Félix Martínez	PRO Front
Córdoba	Laura Elena Rodríguez Machado	PRO Front
Corrientes	Ana Claudia Almirón	Frente de Todos
Corrientes	Néstor Pedro Braillard Poccard	PRO Front
Corrientes	Carlos Mauricio Espínola	Frente de Todos
La Pampa	Norma Haydée Durango	Frente de Todos
La Pampa	Daniel Aníbal Lovera	Frente de Todos
La Pampa	Juan Carlos Marino	Radical Civic Union
Mendoza	Julio César Cleto Cobos	Radical Civic Union
Mendoza	Anabel Fernández Sagasti	Frente de Todos
Mendoza	Pamela Fernanda Verasay	Radical Civic Union
Santa Fe	Roberto Mario Mirabella	Frente de Todos
Santa Fe	María de los Ángeles Sacnun	Frente de Todos
Santa Fe	Alejandra Vucasovich	Santa Fe Federal
Tucumán	José Jorge Alperovich	Frente de Todos
Tucumán	Silvia Beatriz Elías de Pérez	Radical Civic Union
Tucumán	Beatriz Graciela Mirkin	Frente de Todos

== Results ==
=== Primary elections ===
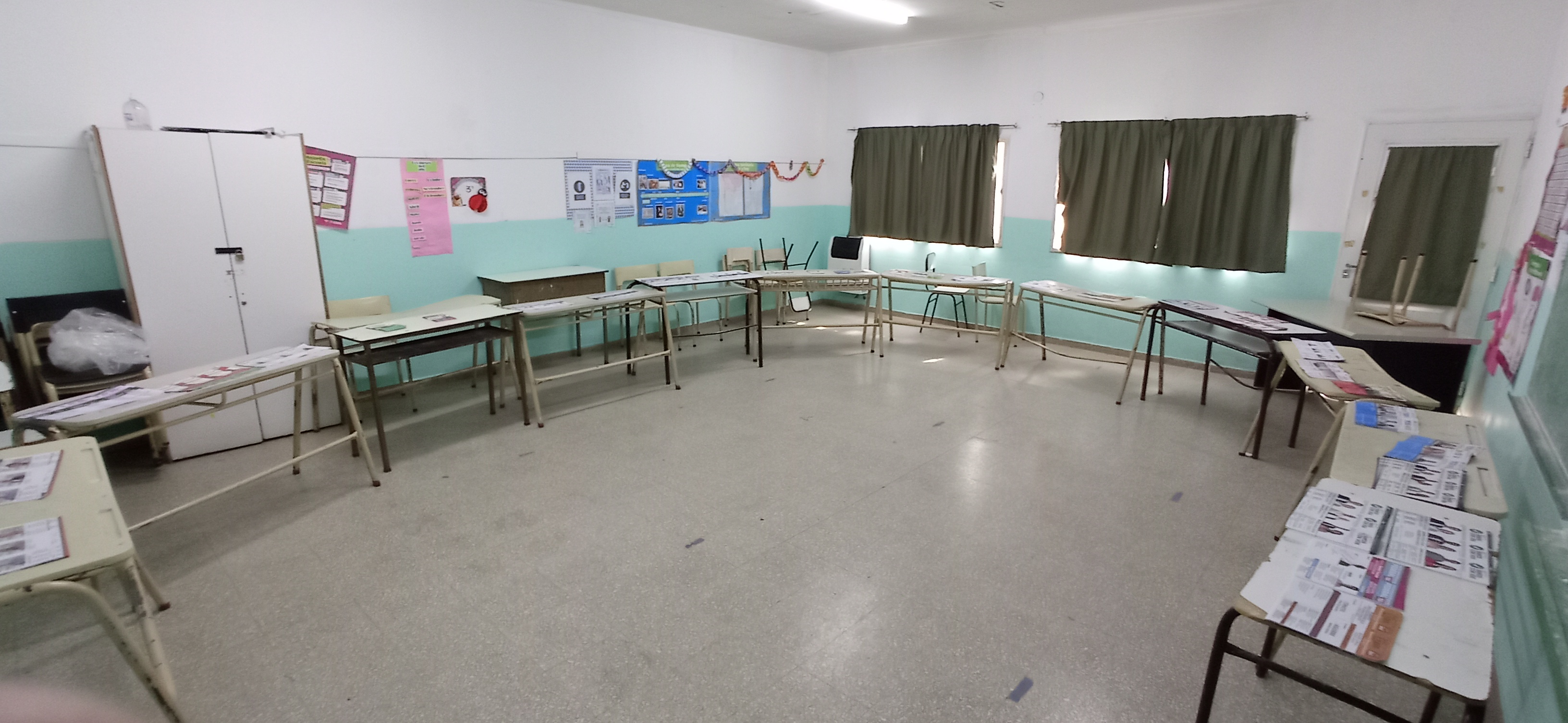
Voting booth in Gonnet, Buenos Aires, in the 2021 PASO elections.

Open primary elections for legislative posts were held nationwide on 12 September. With this system, all parties run primary elections on a single ballot. All parties must take part in it, both the parties with internal factions and parties with a single candidate list. Citizens may vote for any candidate of any party, but may only cast a single vote. The candidate receiving the most votes, of each party gaining 1.5% or higher of the valid votes advances to the general election.

The results were largely negative for the governing Frente de Todos, which received around 30% of the popular vote nationwide and lost in traditionally Peronist-leaning provinces such as Buenos Aires, Chaco, La Pampa, Santa Cruz and Tierra del Fuego. With a nationwide aggregate of 42%, Juntos por el Cambio was the most voted alliance in 16 out of 23 provinces and in the City of Buenos Aires, while local parties won in Neuquén (MPN) and Río Negro (JSRN). Nationwide, the Workers' Left Front was the third-most voted alliance, with exceptionally good results in Jujuy (23.31%), the City of Buenos Aires (6.23%) and Buenos Aires Province (5.22%). In fourth place were the libertarian fronts "Avanza Libertad" and "La Libertad Avanza", which competed in Buenos Aires Province and the City of Buenos Aires (respectively) and received 6.85% of the vote overall, with a particularly strong result in the City, where the front became the third-largest force.

With a turnout of 66.21%, the 2021 primaries had the lowest participation since the implementation of the PASO system in 2011, and were the least-concurred nationwide elections since the return of democracy in 1983.

=== Chamber of Deputies ===
At a press conference, the Minister of the Interior, Eduardo de Pedro, said electoral participation was around 71.72% of the electoral roll, a rise of five points compared to the 67% participation in the PASO, a historical minimum in those kinds of choices.

Argentina's main opposition party, Together for Change, was seen as the big winner of the election, gaining 42.13% of the vote and 61 out of the 127 seats. The Justicialist Party suffered big losses as its coalition lost its majority in the Senate for the first time since the return of democracy in 1983, as well as being defeated in its historical stronghold province of Buenos Aires. Frente de Todos only gathered 34.17% of the vote, winning 50 out of the 127 seats, 11 seats behind Juntos por el Cambio. Observers attributed the loss to the widespread anger over high inflation and rising poverty. FIT-U won 5.53 of the vote and 4 seats, an increase of 2 seats. Federal Consensus lost 3 seats, winning only 3 seats and 5.51% of the vote.

Party or alliance		Votes	%	Seats	Total seats
Juntos por el Cambio	Juntos por el Cambio	9,239,438	39.15	56	116
Juntos por el Cambio	Encuentro por Corrientes	325,710	1.38	2	116
Juntos por el Cambio	Together for Free Formosa	134,445	0.57	1	116
Juntos por el Cambio	United for San Luis	126,693	0.54	2	116
Juntos por el Cambio	Civic Coalition ARI	53,365	0.23	0	116
Juntos por el Cambio	Let's go La Rioja	49,837	0.21	0	116
Juntos por el Cambio	Radical Civic Union	13,870	0.06	0	116
Juntos por el Cambio	Total	9,943,358	42.13	61	116
Frente de Todos	Frente de Todos	7,474,030	31.67	46	118
Frente de Todos	Civic Front for Santiago	363,144	1.54	3	118
Frente de Todos	San Luis Force	125,163	0.53	1	118
Frente de Todos	Renewal Front	39,658	0.17	0	118
Frente de Todos	Federal Commitment	35,657	0.15	0	118
Frente de Todos	Faith Party	24,362	0.10	0	118
Frente de Todos	Everyone United	3,638	0.02	0	118
Frente de Todos	Total	8,065,652	34.17	50	118
Libertarians/Conservatives	Avanza Libertad	669,865	2.84	2	2
Libertarians/Conservatives	La Libertad Avanza	358,377	1.52	2	2
Libertarians/Conservatives	+Valores	263,515	1.12	0	0
Libertarians/Conservatives	Republican Force	101,350	0.43	0	0
Libertarians/Conservatives	Unite por la Libertad y la Dignidad	75,023	0.32	0	0
Libertarians/Conservatives	Encuentro Vecinal Córdoba	74,879	0.32	0	0
Libertarians/Conservatives	Let's Go! Mendocinos	38,210	0.16	0	0
Libertarians/Conservatives	We Can	31,763	0.13	0	0
Libertarians/Conservatives	Conservative People's Party	29,569	0.13	0	0
Libertarians/Conservatives	Freedom, Values and Change Party	22,996	0.10	0	0
Libertarians/Conservatives	Union of the Democratic Centre	17,092	0.07	0	0
Libertarians/Conservatives	Federal Popular Union	16,374	0.07	0	0
Libertarians/Conservatives	United Republicans	6,403	0.03	0	0
Libertarians/Conservatives	Total	1,705,416	7.23	4	4
Workers' Left Front	Workers' Left Front	1,210,906	5.13	4	4
Workers' Left Front	Workers' Party	66,666	0.28	0	0
Workers' Left Front	Workers' Socialist Movement	27,946	0.12	0	0
Workers' Left Front	Total	1,305,518	5.53	4	4
Vamos con Vos; Federal Consensus	We Do for Córdoba	491,969	2.08	2	3
Vamos con Vos; Federal Consensus	Vamos con Vos	415,905	1.76	1	3
Vamos con Vos; Federal Consensus	Broad Front	270,267	1.15	1	2
Vamos con Vos; Federal Consensus	Freemen of the South Movement	48,749	0.21	0	0
Vamos con Vos; Federal Consensus	Socialist Party	39,100	0.17	0	0
Vamos con Vos; Federal Consensus	Ischigualasto Consensus	35,142	0.15	0	0
Vamos con Vos; Federal Consensus	Total	1,301,132	5.51	4	8
Front for the Renewal of Concord		230,817	0.98	1	2
Together We Are Río Negro		140,634	0.60	1	2
Neuquén People's Movement		112,027	0.47	1	1
Green Party		91,187	0.39	0	0
Independent Salta + Salta Renewal Party Front		86,238	0.37	0	0
Popular Sovereignty		81,795	0.35	0	0
United for Salta		71,992	0.31	0	0
Self-determination and Freedom		56,369	0.24	0	0
Integrating Front		49,502	0.21	0	0
Patriotic Labor Front		48,085	0.20	0	0
We are Energy to Renew Santa Cruz		46,633	0.20	1	2
Independent Party of Chubut		44,053	0.19	0	0
We are Future		41,126	0.17	0	0
Federal Party		38,087	0.16	0	0
We Are All Chubut		29,622	0.13	0	0
FELICIDAD Party		28,796	0.12	0	0
Santa Fe First		27,771	0.12	0	0
Movimiento al Socialismo		27,311	0.12	0	0
We are Fuegians		15,342	0.07	0	0
Buenos Aires Thought Stream		5,991	0.03	0	0
United		3,446	0.01	0	0
Fueguian People's Movement		2,563	0.01	0	0
Principles and Conviction Party		2,030	0.01	0	0
Total		23,602,493	100.00	127	257
Valid votes		23,602,493	95.01		
Invalid votes		447,527	1.80		
Blank votes		792,552	3.19		
Total votes		24,842,572	100.00		
Registered voters/turnout		34,796,245	71.39		
Source: Padron, DINE

==== Results by province ====
Province	JxC			FdT			Lib./Cons.			FIT-U			We Go With You			Others		
Province	Votes	%	Seats	Votes	%	Seats	Votes	%	Seats	Votes	%	Seats	Votes	%	Seats	Votes	%	Seats
Buenos Aires	3,550,321	39.77	15	3,444,446	38.59	15	933,380	10.46	2	609,158	6.82	2	389,295	4.36	1	—	—	—
Buenos Aires City	867,044	47.09	7	461,514	25.06	3	313,808	17.04	2	142,581	7.74	1	—	—	—	56,369	3.06	—
Catamarca	75,625	37.14	1	103,144	50.65	2	—	—	—	8,728	4.29	—	10,150	4.98	—	5,991	2.94	—
Chaco	258,654	42.74	2	269,441	44.52	2	—	—	—	15,169	2.51	—	12,464	2.06	—	49,502	8.18	—
Chubut	110,649	37.97	1	82,134	28.19	1	—	—	—	24,941	8.56	—	—	—	—	73,675	25.28	—
Córdoba	1,064,246	54.06	6	206,795	10.50	1	135,822	6.90	—	69,755	3.54	—	491,969	24.99	2	—	—	—
Corrientes	325,710	58.73	2	214,694	38.71	1	—	—	—	—	—	—	14,146	2.55	—	—	—	—
Entre Ríos	436,013	54.61	3	276,883	34.68	2	29,569	3.70	—	27,946	3.50	—	16,710	2.09	—	11,282	1.41	—
Formosa	134,445	41.56	1	186,991	57.81	1	—	—	—	—	—	—	—	—	—	2,030	0.63	—
Jujuy	198,300	49.12	1	104,496	25.89	1	—	—	—	100,892	24.99	1	—	—	—	—	—	—
La Pampa	101,717	48.01	2	89,813	42.39	1	—	—	—	9,147	4.32	—	6,199	2.93	—	4,984	2.35	—
La Rioja	49,837	27.97	—	100,055	56.16	2	17,092	9.59	—	7,721	4.33	—	—	—	—	3,446	1.93	—
Mendoza	490,182	49.58	3	282,695	28.59	2	38,210	3.86	—	48,395	4.89	—	—	—	—	129,274	13.07	—
Misiones	257,323	40.86	2	96,310	15.29	—	22,996	3.65	—	22,336	3.55	—	—	—	—	230,817	36.65	1
Neuquén	140,303	36.88	1	66,070	17.37	1	—	—	—	31,153	8.19	—	30,884	8.12	—	112,027	29.45	1
Río Negro	102,579	27.21	1	101,844	27.01	—	—	—	—	18,192	4.83	—	7,749	2.06	—	146,657	38.90	1
Salta	188,162	29.99	1	205,853	32.81	2	—	—	—	46,397	7.39	—	—	—	—	187,026	29.81	—
San Juan	173,069	42.14	1	179,000	43.58	2	—	—	—	23,487	5.72	—	35,142	8.56	—	—	—	—
San Luis	140,563	51.16	2	128,801	46.88	1	—	—	—	5,365	1.95	—	—	—	—	—	—	—
Santa Cruz	57,921	35.09	1	45,436	27.52	1	—	—	—	11,660	7.06	—	—	—	—	50,058	30.32	1
Santa Fe	733,360	40.32	5	570,498	31.36	3	102,613	5.64	—	39,063	2.15	—	222,740	12.25	1	150,692	8.28	—
Santiago del Estero	72,932	13.03	—	402,802	71.96	3	4,173	0.75	—	5,444	0.97	—	26,307	4.70	—	48,085	8.59	—
Tierra del Fuego	27,584	29.02	1	37,692	39.65	1	6,403	6.74	—	3,883	4.08	—	—	—	—	19,502	20.51	—
Tucumán	386,819	39.96	2	408,245	42.18	2	101,350	10.47	—	34,105	3.52	—	37,377	3.86	—	—	—	—
Total	9,943,358	42.13	61	8,065,652	34.17	50	1,705,416	7.23	4	1,305,518	5.53	4	1,301,132	5.51	4	1,281,417	5.43	4

=== Senate ===
In the senate, Together for Change won 14 out of 24 seats available, making an increase of 5. Frente de Todos lost 4 seats, gathering only 9 seats. The last available seat went to Federal Consensus with FIT-U gaining none.

Party or alliance		Votes	%	Seats	Total seats
Juntos por el Cambio	Juntos por el Cambio	2,962,225	42.20	12	33
Juntos por el Cambio	Encuentro por Corrientes	328,217	4.68	2	33
Juntos por el Cambio	Total	3,290,442	46.88	14	33
Frente de Todos	Frente de Todos	1,937,947	27.61	9	35
Frente de Todos	Federal Commitment	35,970	0.51	0	0
Frente de Todos	Total	1,973,917	28.12	9	35
Vamos con Vos/Federal Consensus	We Do for Córdoba	491,029	7.00	1	1
Vamos con Vos/Federal Consensus	Broad Front	281,092	4.00	0	0
Vamos con Vos/Federal Consensus	We Go With You	13,934	0.20	0	0
Vamos con Vos/Federal Consensus	Socialist Party	6,206	0.09	0	0
Vamos con Vos/Federal Consensus	Total	792,261	11.29	1	1
Libertarians/Conservatives	Republican Force	107,829	1.54	0	0
Libertarians/Conservatives	Encuentro Vecinal Córdoba	74,024	1.05	0	0
Libertarians/Conservatives	Unite por la Libertad y la Dignidad	66,910	0.95	0	0
Libertarians/Conservatives	La Libertad Avanza	44,819	0.64	0	0
Libertarians/Conservatives	Let's Go! Mendocinos	37,992	0.54	0	0
Libertarians/Conservatives	We Can	31,588	0.45	0	0
Libertarians/Conservatives	Federal Popular Union	16,860	0.24	0	0
Libertarians/Conservatives	Total	380,022	5.41	0	0
Workers' Left Front		233,598	3.33	0	0
Green Party		90,949	1.30	0	0
Popular Sovereignty		64,010	0.91	0	0
Independent Party of Chubut		44,736	0.64	0	0
We are Future		39,526	0.56	0	0
Federal Party		38,417	0.55	0	0
Santa Fe First		30,117	0.43	0	0
We Are All Chubut		29,937	0.43	0	0
Buenos Aires Thought Stream		6,066	0.09	0	0
Movimiento al Socialismo		4,939	0.07	0	0
Federal Peronism					1
Together We Are Río Negro					1
Front for the Renewal of Concord					1
Total		7,018,937	100.00	24	72
Valid votes		7,018,937	94.33		
Invalid votes		164,099	2.21		
Blank votes		257,523	3.46		
Total votes		7,440,559	100.00		
Registered voters/turnout		10,505,451	70.83		
Source: Padron, DINE

==== Results by province ====
Province	JxC			FdT			VcV			Lib./Cons.			Others		
Province	Votes	%	Seats	Votes	%	Seats	Votes	%	Seats	Votes	%	Seats	Votes	%	Seats
Catamarca	76,354	37.12	1	104,412	50.76	2	10,167	4.94	—	—	—	—	14,753	7.17	—
Chubut	110,997	37.87	2	82,674	28.21	1	—	—	—	—	—	—	99,443	33.93	—
Córdoba	1,063,595	54.09	2	206,300	10.49	—	491,029	24.97	1	135,703	6.90	—	69,644	3.54	—
Corrientes	328,217	58.82	2	215,822	38.68	1	13,934	2.50	—	—	—	—	—	—	—
La Pampa	102,218	48.25	2	89,409	42.21	1	6,206	2.93	—	—	—	—	14,005	6.61	—
Mendoza	490,754	49.57	2	284,119	28.70	1	—	—	—	37,992	3.84	—	177,230	17.90	—
Santa Fe	738,568	40.41	2	589,837	32.27	1	228,459	12.50	—	98,498	5.39	—	172,507	9.44	—
Tucumán	379,739	39.31	1	401,344	41.54	2	42,466	4.40	—	107,829	11.16	—	34,713	3.59	—
Total	3,290,442	46.88	14	1,973,917	28.12	9	792,261	11.29	1	380,022	5.41	0	582,295	8.30	0

== Aftermath ==
Argentina's President Alberto Fernández called for dialogue with the opposition after Sunday's midterm parliamentary elections, with the results showing his governing coalition has lost control of Congress. "An opposition that is responsible and open to dialogue is a patriotic opposition," Fernández said, adding that he hoped for cooperation that would be "fruitful, for the general interests of the country".

Argentina's main opposition party, Together for Change, celebrated the victory in the legislative elections. Former president Mauricio Macri reacted, "The result confirms that it is the end of one era, and the beginning of another". Macri continued saying, "These next two years are going to be difficult", while assuring voters that his coalition would "act with great responsibility".

The Argentinian peso went up in value following the opposition's win. Alberto Ramos, an analyst at Goldman Sachs, explained the rise: "The market is likely to take a net positive view of the election results. A more market-friendly composition of Congress could lead to more effective checks and balances, and ultimately a policy regime shift in 2023."
