= Dante López Rodríguez =

Argentine politician (born 1969)

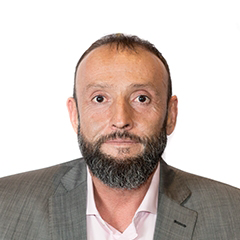

National Deputy
- Incumbent
- Assumed office 10 December 2019
- Constituency: Catamarca

Personal details
- Born: 13 December 1969 (age 56) San Fernando del Valle de Catamarca, Argentina
- Party: Justicialist Party
- Other political affiliations: Unidad Ciudadana (2017–2019); Frente de Todos (2019–present)
- Education: National University of Córdoba

Dante Edgardo López Rodríguez (born 13 December 1969) is an Argentine architect and politician, currently serving as National Deputy elected in Catamarca Province. López Rodríguez first ran for a seat in 2017 for Unidad Ciudadana, and since 2019 sits in the Frente de Todos bloc.

== Early and personal life ==
López Rodríguez was born on 13 December 1969 in San Fernando del Valle de Catamarca. He studied architecture at the National University of Córdoba, graduating in 2005. He is married and has four children.

== Political career ==
Before 2019, López Rodríguez was the administrator of Catamarca's Provincial Housing Institute (IPV).

Ahead of the 2017 legislative election, López Rodríguez was selected as the third candidate in the Justicialist Front for Victory (Unidad Ciudadana) list to the Argentine Chamber of Deputies, behind Gustavo Saadi and Silvana Ginocchio. The list received 47.84% of the votes, enough for Saadi and Ginocchio to be elected, but not enough for López Rodríguez to make it past the D'Hondt cut. Following the 2019 general election, Saadi was elected as intendente (mayor) of the City of Catamarca, and López Rodríguez filled his vacancy. He was sworn in on 10 December 2019, forming part of the Frente de Todos parliamentary bloc.

As deputy, López Rodríguez formed part of the parliamentary commissions on Housing and Urban Planning, Mining, Energy and Fuels, Economy, Science and Technology, and Public Works. He voted in favour of the 2020 Voluntary Interruption of Pregnancy bill that passed the Chamber. During the 2020 legislative period, López Rodríguez was noted as one of the two members of the lower house not to speak a single word in the chamber, alongside Nelly Daldovo of Santiago del Estero.

Ahead of the 2021 primary election, López Rodríguez was confirmed as one of the candidates for re-election in the Frente de Todos list in Catamarca, as the second candidate in the list.
