= Laura Russo (politician) =

Argentine politician

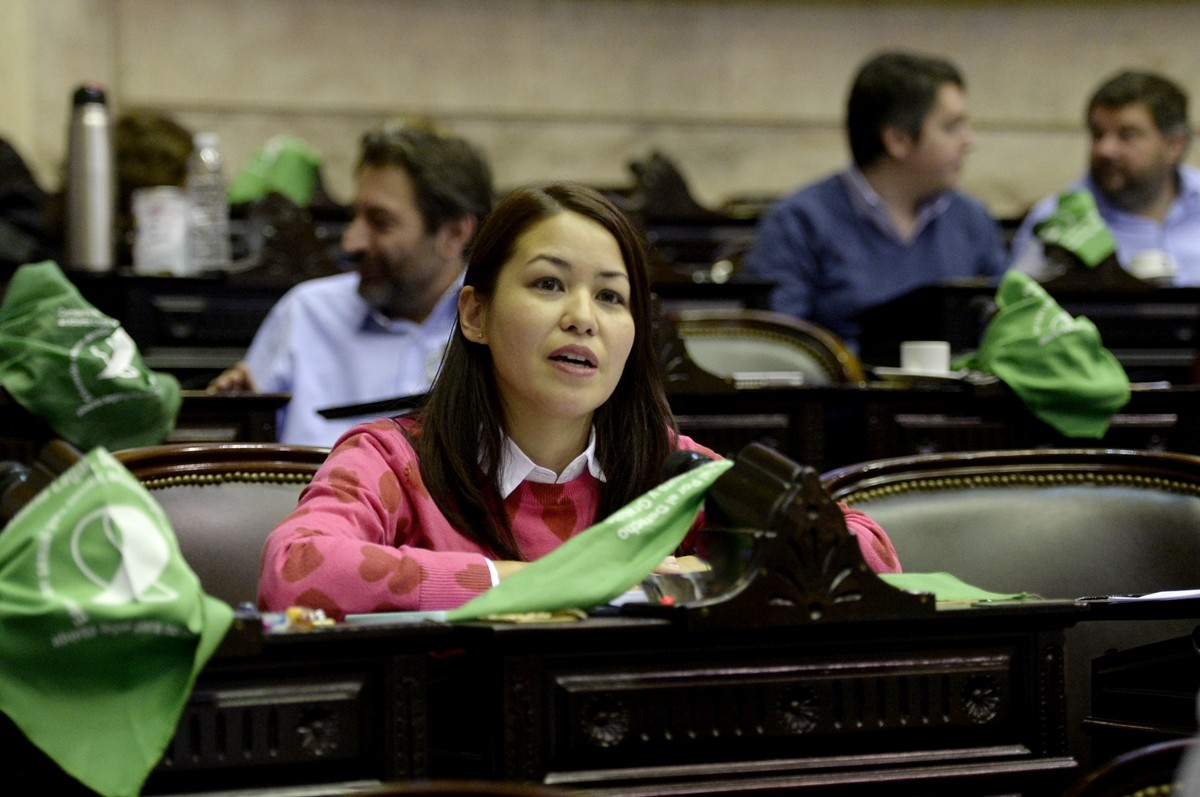

National Deputy
- In office 10 December 2017 – 10 December 2021
- Constituency: Buenos Aires

Personal details
- Born: 1 November 1981 (age 44) Buenos Aires, Argentina
- Party: Justicialist Party
- Other political affiliations: Unidad Ciudadana (2017–2019); Frente de Todos (2019–present)
- Education: Argentine University of Enterprise

Laura Russo (born 1 November 1981) is an Argentine politician who served as a National Deputy from 2017 to 2021. A member of the Justicialist Party, Russo was elected in 2017 in Buenos Aires Province, and formed part of the Frente de Todos bloc from 2019 to 2021.

== Early life and education ==
Russo was born on 1 November 1981 in Buenos Aires, and spent her childhood in the Villa Urquiza neighbourhood. Her father is Argentine, while her mother is Japanese. She finished high school in Belgrano and studied Public Relations at the Argentine University of Enterprise.

Russo was married to Ariel Sujarchuk, the intendente (mayor) of Escobar, until 2019. Sujarchuk and Russo have two children.

== Political career ==
Russo ran for a seat in the Argentine Chamber of Deputies in the 2017 legislative election; she was the 13th candidate in the Unidad Ciudadana list in Buenos Aires Province. Before that, she was a councilwoman in Escobar Partido. The Unidad Ciudadana list received 36.28% of the votes, and Russo made it past the D'Hondt cut to be elected. She was sworn in on 6 December 2017.

As a national deputy, Russo formed part of the parliamentary commissions on Families, Childhood and Youth (of which she was appointed vice-president), Municipal Affairs, Commerce, Consumer Rights and Competition, Petitions, Foreign Affairs and Worship, and Tourism. She was a supporter of the 2020 Voluntary Interruption of Pregnancy bill, which legalized abortion in Argentina. Her support for the bill caused protesters to stage an intervention in front of her home in Belén de Escobar.

In 2021, she was appointed President of the "Parliamentary Commission on Friendship with the United States", and in June 2021 she accompanied Chamber of Deputies president Sergio Massa on a diplomatic trip to the Washington, D.C. to meet with members of the United States Congress.

Russo did not run for re-election in 2021, and her term expired on 9 December 2021.

== Electoral history ==
Electoral history of Laura Russo
Election	Office	List	#	District	Votes			Result	Ref.
Election	Office	List	#	District	Total	%	P.	Result	Ref.
2013	Councillor	Front for Victory	1 (Note: Alternate candidate.)	Escobar Partido	29,876	25.25%	2nd (Note: Presented on an electoral list. The data shown represents the share of the vote the entire party/alliance received in that constituency.)	Elected	
2017	National Deputy	Unidad Ciudadana	10	Buenos Aires Province	3,383,114	36.28%	2nd	Elected	
