= Pablo Ansaloni =

Argentine trade unionist and politician

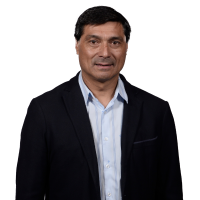

National Deputy
- Incumbent
- Assumed office 10 December 2023
- Constituency: Buenos Aires
- In office 10 December 2017 – 10 December 2021
- Constituency: Buenos Aires

Personal details
- Born: 9 May 1971 (age 55) Colón, Buenos Aires, Argentina
- Party: Justicialist Party (until 2013); Faith Party (since 2013)
- Other political affiliations: Cambiemos (2015–2019); Frente de Todos (2021–2023); La Libertad Avanza (since 2023)

Pablo Miguel Ansaloni (born 9 May 1971) is an Argentine trade unionist and politician who has been a National Deputy since 2023, elected in Buenos Aires Province. He previously held the same position from 2017 to 2021. He was a member of UATRE, the rural workers' union, until his expulsion in 2021. He is a member of the minor Faith Party.

== Early and personal life ==
Ansaloni was born on 9 May 1971 in Colón, a small town in Northern Buenos Aires Province. He is married to Rosana Cejas and has five children. He has been a rural worker since his youth.

== Career ==
Ansaloni's political career began in the Justicialist Party. He was a member of the party council of the Colón branch of the PJ from 2007 to 2011, and then served as president of the Colón Justicialist Party from 2008 to 2013. In 2013, Ansaloni became a founding member of the Faith Party (Partido Fe), led by former rural workers' union leader Gerónimo Venegas. In 2019, following Venegas' death, Ansaloni was elected president of the Faith Party.

Ahead of the 2015 general election, the Faith Party allied with the Cambiemos alliance and backed the presidential candidacy of Mauricio Macri. Ansaloni ran for a seat in the Argentine Chamber of Deputies in the 2017 legislative election; he was the 14th candidate in the Cambiemos list in Buenos Aires Province. The list was the most voted in the general election with 42.15% of the vote, and Ansaloni was elected.

As deputy, Ansaloni formed part of the parliamentary commissions on Natural Resources, Sports, Elderly People, Agriculture and Livestock, and Labour Legislation. Ansaloni was an opponent of the legalization of abortion in Argentina. He voted against of the two Voluntary Interruption of Pregnancy bills that were debated by the Argentine Congress in 2018 and 2020.

Ansaloni left the Juntos por el Cambio (Cambiemos) parliamentary bloc in the aftermath of the 2019 general election, forming part of the Unidad Federal y Desarollo bloc, led by Mendoza deputy José Luis Ramón. Ahead of the 2021 legislative election, Ansaloni and the Faith Party backed the governing Frente de Todos.

In January 2021, Ansaloni caused controversy when he made anti-semitic statements during a speech to members of his party. His comments were condemned by his party, and UATRE mandated his expulsion from the union. He was also condemned by the DAIA, a Jewish Argentine civil association. He would later issue an apology and retract his statements.

Ansaloni did not run for re-election in 2021, and his term expired on 9 December 2021.

== Electoral history ==
Electoral history of Pablo Ansaloni
| Election | Office | List | # | District | Votes | | | Result | Ref. |
| Election | Office | List | # | District | Total | % | P. | Result | Ref. |
|---|---|---|---|---|---|---|---|---|---|
| 2017 | National Deputy | Cambiemos | 14 | Buenos Aires Province | 3,930,406 | 42.15% | 1st (Note: Presented on an electoral list. The data shown represents the share of the vote the entire party/alliance received in that constituency.) | Elected | |
| 2023 | National Deputy | La Libertad Avanza | 5 | Buenos Aires Province | 2,382,198 | 25.43% | 3rd | Elected | |
