= Pablo Carro =

Argentine politician (born 1965)

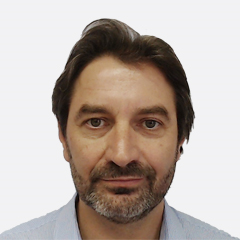

National Deputy
- Incumbent
- Assumed office 10 December 2017
- Constituency: Córdoba

Personal details
- Born: 29 March 1965 (age 61) Buenos Aires, Argentina
- Party: Justicialist Party
- Other political affiliations: Unidad Ciudadana (2017–2019); Frente de Todos (2019–present)
- Education: National University of Córdoba

Pablo Carro (born 29 March 1965) is an Argentine politician, professor, and trade unionist, currently serving as National Deputy elected in Córdoba. A member of the Justicialist Party, Carro was first elected in 2017 and re-elected in 2021. In addition, he served as secretary general of the University Professors and Researchers' Union of Córdoba (ADIUC) and secretary general of the Córdoba chapter of the Argentine Workers' Central Union.

== Early life and education ==
Carro was born on 29 March 1965 in Buenos Aires. He studied social communication at the National University of Córdoba, graduating in 1997, and later attained a master's degree in communication and culture from the same university, completed in 2007. Later, in 2010, he finished a master's degree in political science from the University of Santiago de Compostela.

Carro has been an adjunct professor of Politics and Communication at his alma mater.

== Political career ==
Carro's trade union career began in the University Professors and Researchers' Union of Córdoba (Spanish: Asociación de Docentes e Investigadores Universitarios de Córdoba), which groups National University of Córdoba faculty. He rose through the ranks and eventually became the union's secretary general, a position he held until 2017. He also served as secretary general of the Córdoba Province chapter of the Argentine Workers' Central Union (CTA).

At the 2017 legislative election, Carro ran for one of Córdoba's seats in the National Chamber of Deputies as the first candidate in the Córdoba Ciudadana alliance list. The list received 9.71% of the vote, enough for only Carro to be elected. Upon taking office, he formed part of the Front for Victory parliamentary bloc. Following the 2019 general election, Carro joined the Frente de Todos bloc alongside most other members of the Front for Victory bloc.

Carro ran for re-election in 2021, as the third candidate in the Frente de Todos list, which was headed by Martín Gill. The list received 10.51% of the vote, once again, enough for just one of its candidates to make it past the D'Hondt cut. Gill, however, did not take office as deputy in the end, and as per the 2018 gender parity law, Carro took office in Gill's stead.

As a national deputy, Carro formed part of the parliamentary commissions on Agriculture and Livestock, Education, Labour Legislation, Freedom of Expression, and Municipal Affairs, and presided the commission on Communications and IT. He was a vocal supporter of the legalisation of abortion in Argentina, voting in favour of the two Voluntary Interruption of Pregnancy bills that were debated by the Argentine Congress in 2018 and 2020.
