= Josefina González =

Argentine human rights activist and politician

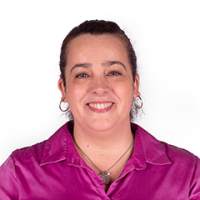

National Deputy
- In office 10 December 2013 – 10 December 2021
- Constituency: Santa Fe

Personal details
- Born: 17 February 1976 (age 50) Rosario, Argentina
- Party: Justicialist Party
- Other political affiliations: Front for Victory (2013–2017); Unidad Ciudadana (2017–2019); Frente de Todos (2019–present)

Josefina Victoria "Tana" Tosetto González (born 17 February 1976) is an Argentine human rights activist and politician who served as a National Deputy elected in Santa Fe Province. A member of the Justicialist Party and La Cámpora, she was first elected in 2013 and re-elected in 2017.

González is the daughter of two "desaparecidos", alleged political dissidents of the military dictatorship that ruled Argentina from 1976 to 1983. She was active in HIJOS, a human rights organization formed by children of victims of the military dictatorship.

== Early life ==
Josefina Victoria Tosetto González was born on 17 February 1976 in Rosario, shortly before the coup d'état that established the last civic–military dictatorship of Argentina (1976–1983). She was daughter of Dardo José Tosetto and Rut González, both active in the ERP-PRT. Tosetto had been illegally detained and kidnapped by military authorities in Rosario between the 9th and the 11th of December 1975; González, who was still pregnant with Josefina, fled to Tosetto's family home in Brinkmann, Córdoba. Tosetto remains missing to this date.

Josefina and her elder sister, Mariana, were both kidnapped alongside their mother on 19 July 1976. The three were taken to an Army-operated clandestine detention center. A local family court initially gave the two girls away to two Provincial Police officers, but they were retrieved by an aunt. During her time in captivity, Josefina suffered beatings at the hand of Major Agustín Feced, then interventor of the Rosario City Police. Rut González was executed in captivity, and her death was made official on 5 October 1976.

Josefina's grandmother, Amorosa Brunet de González, her aunt, Estrella González, and her uncle Héctor Vitantonio, were all also kidnapped and "disappeared" by the military on 23 September 1976. Estrella González and Vitantonio were both executed, while Amorosa Brunet remains missing.

== Activism ==
Starting in 1995, while she was still a teenager, González began her human rights activism in HIJOS–Sons and Daughters for Identity and Justice Against forgetfulness and Silence. Years later, during the presidency of Néstor Kirchner, González became part of La Cámpora, the youth organization formed to back Kirchner's government and later the government of Cristina Fernández de Kirchner; González became the organization's human rights secretary in Santa Fe.

González was a key witness and plaintiff in the trial against General Ramón Genaro Díaz Bessone. Díaz Bessone, as well as former Santa Fe Provincial police commissar Rubén Lofiego, were both given life sentences on grounds of human rights violations. The trial finalized on 26 March 2012.

== Political career ==
In the 2013 legislative election, González ran for a seat in the Argentine Chamber of Deputies as the second candidate in the Front for Victory list in Santa Fe Province, behind Jorge Obeid. The list came third with 22.67% of the vote, and enough for both Obeid and González to be elected. She was re-elected in the 2017 legislative election, this time running as the third candidate in the Justicialist Front list, which received 25.90% of the vote.

During her 2017–2021 term, González presided the parliamentary commission on Political Trials, and formed part of the commissions on Addiction Prevention, Freedom of Expression, Disabilities, Human Rights and Guarantees, and Elderly People. She was a supporter of the legalisation of abortion in Argentina, voting in favour of the two Voluntary Interruption of Pregnancy bills that were debated by the Argentine Congress in 2018 and 2020.

González did not run for re-election in 2021, and her term expired on 9 December 2021.

== Personal life ==
González is married to Federico Guillermo Reynares Solari. On 26 June 2017, while driving on Ruta Nacional 33 near Chovet, González suffered a major car crashed that resulted in the death of her photographer, Ignacio Amaya. She was gravely injured and remained in a coma for 10 days.
