= Ana Almirón =

Argentine politician

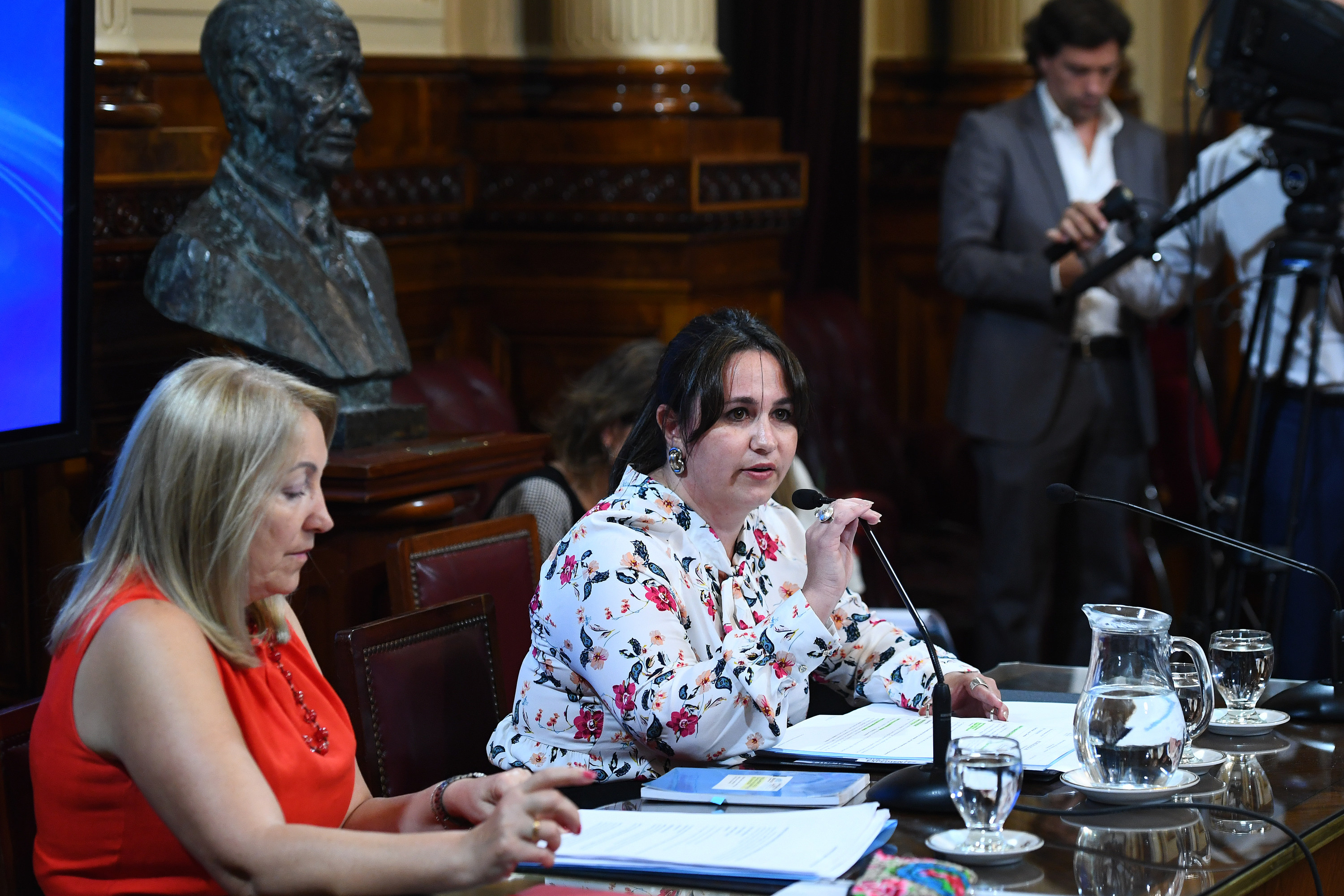

National Senator
- In office 10 December 2015 – 10 December 2021
- Constituency: Corrientes

Personal details
- Born: 2 July 1984 (age 42) Paso de los Libres, Argentina
- Party: Justicialist Party
- Other political affiliations: Front for Victory (2015–2017); Citizen's Unity (2017–2019); Frente de Todos (since 2019)
- Education: National University of the Northeast

Ana Claudia Almirón (born 2 July 1984) is an Argentine politician who was a National Senator for Corrientes Province from 2015 to 2021. A member of the Justicialist Party, she was part of the Front for Victory and Frente de Todos parliamentary blocs.

== Early life and education ==
Almirón was born on 2 July 1984 in Paso de los Libres, a border city in Corrientes Province just across Uruguaiana, Brazil. She finished high school at the Escuela Normal de Paso de los Libres, and then went on to study law at the National University of the Northeast (UNNE), graduating in 2009. She has one child.

== Political career ==
Almirón began her political career in La Cámpora, the youth wing of the Front for Victory. She was in charge of the Center for Judicial Access of Corrientes from 2011 to 2015.

In the 2015 general election, Almirón ran for one of Corrientes' three seats in the Argentine Senate as the second candidate in the Front for Victory list, behind Carlos Espínola. Espínola and Almirón's list was the most voted in the province, with 53% of the vote, granting both candidates the seats for the majority as per the Senate's limited voting system. Upon taking office, aged 30, she became the youngest senator in the chamber. Almirón formed part of the Front for Victory bloc, remaining in it even after most of its members broke away and formed the Argentina Federal bloc following the 2017 legislative election.

As a senator, Almirón formed part of the parliamentary commissions on Accords, National Economy and Investment, Women's Affairs, Labour and Social Security, and Health, and presided the commission on General Legislation. She was a supporter of the legalization of abortion in Argentina, voting in favour of the two Voluntary Interruption of Pregnancy bills debated by the Argentine Congress in 2018 and 2020. During the 2020 debate in the Senate chamber, Almirón brought to nationwide attention the case of a baby shower held in Corrientes for a girl who had been raped.

She ran for re-election in the 2021 legislative election, this time as the second candidate in the Frente de Todos list, once again behind Espínola. The Frente de Todos list received 36%, losing by a wide margin to the ECO list headed by Eduardo Vischi, which received 58.9% of the vote. As part of the second-most voted list, only Espínola was re-elected for the minority, while Almirón lost her chance at re-election.
