= Walter Correa =

Argentine trade unionist and politician

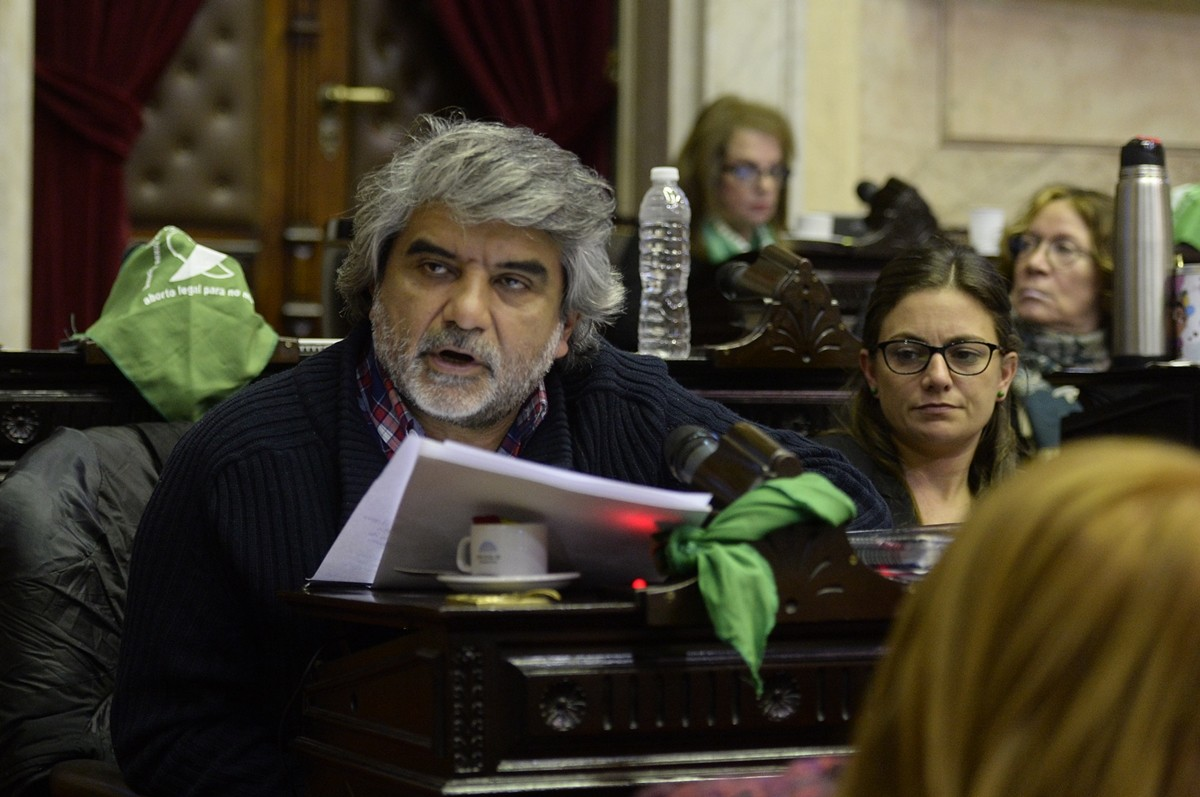

Minister of Labour of Buenos Aires Province
- Incumbent
- Assumed office 22 August 2022
- Governor: Axel Kicillof
- Preceded by: Mara Ruiz Malec

National Deputy
- In office 10 December 2017 – 10 December 2021
- Constituency: Buenos Aires

Personal details
- Born: 30 October 1965 (age 60) Moreno, Buenos Aires Province, Argentina
- Party: Justicialist Party
- Other political affiliations: Front for Victory (2013–2017); Unidad Ciudadana (2017–2019); Frente de Todos (2019–present)

Jorge Walter Correa (born 30 October 1965) is an Argentine trade unionist and politician who was a National Deputy from 2017 to 2021, elected in Buenos Aires Province. Correa is the Secretary General of the Sindicato de Obreros Curtidores (SOCRA), Argentina's leather workers' union. A member of the Justicialist Party, he was elected as part of the Unidad Ciudadana list in 2017, and later sat in the Frente de Todos parliamentary bloc in the Chamber of Deputies.

From 2013 to 2017, Correa was a member of the City Council of Moreno. Since 2022, he has served as Minister of Labour of Buenos Aires Province under Governor Axel Kicillof.

== Early life and education ==
Correa was born on 30 October 1965 in Moreno, a city in the Greater Buenos Aires conurbation. He has a high school accountancy degree. He is married.

== Career ==
Correa was elected to the position of Secretary General of SOCRA in 2012, and was re-elected in 2016. Prior to that, he was Secretary General of the Greater Buenos Aires chapter of SOCRA.

In 2013, Correa was elected to the Moreno City Council on the Front for Victory list. Correa ran for a seat in the Argentine Chamber of Deputies in the 2017 legislative election; he was the 10th candidate in the Unidad Ciudadana list in Buenos Aires Province. The Unidad Ciudadana list received 36.28% of the votes, and Correa was elected. He was sworn in on 6 December 2017.

As deputy, Correa formed part of the parliamentary commissions on National Defense, Small and Medium-sized Businesses, Cooperative Affairs, Industry and Labour Legislation. Correa was a supporter of the legalization of abortion in Argentina. He voted in favour of the two Voluntary Interruption of Pregnancy bills that were debated by the Argentine Congress in 2018 and 2020. He has also introduced legislation to reform the pensions system for leather workers, and to regulate remote workers.

Ahead of the 2021 primary election, Correa was confirmed as one of the candidates for re-election in the Frente de Todos list in Buenos Aires Province. The list did not receive enough votes for Correa to make it past the D'Hondt cut, and so he was not re-elected. His term expired on 9 December 2021.

== Electoral history ==
Electoral history of Walter Correa
Election	Office	List	#	District	Votes			Result	Ref.
Election	Office	List	#	District	Total	%	P.	Result	Ref.
2017	National Deputy	Unidad Ciudadana	10	Buenos Aires Province	3,383,114	36.28%	2nd (Note: Presented on an electoral list. The data shown represents the share of the vote the entire party/alliance received in that constituency.)	Elected	
2021	National Deputy	Frente de Todos	18	Buenos Aires Province	3,444,446	38.59%	2nd	Not elected	
