= Silvana Ginocchio =

Argentine politician (born 1965)

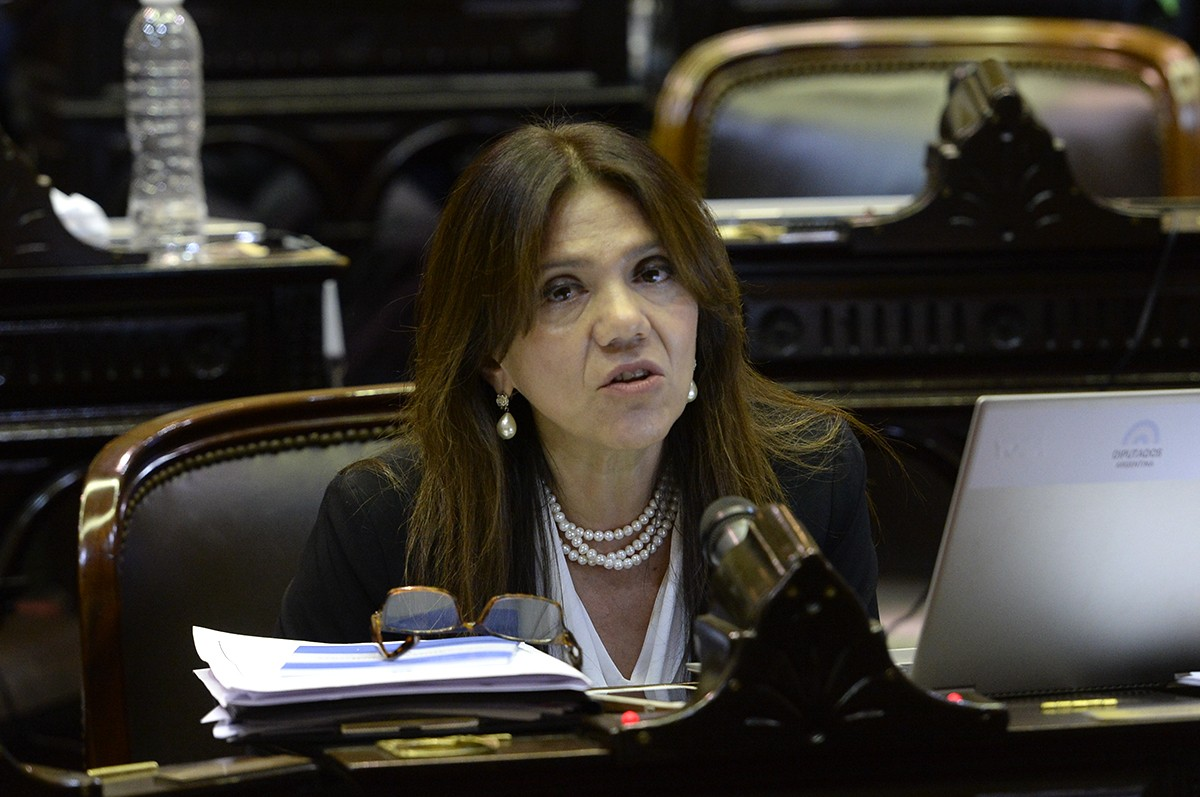

National Deputy
- Incumbent
- Assumed office 10 December 2017
- Constituency: Catamarca

Personal details
- Born: 10 October 1965 (age 60) San Fernando del Valle de Catamarca, Argentina
- Party: Justicialist Party
- Other political affiliations: Unidad Ciudadana (2017–2019); Frente de Todos (2019–present)
- Education: National University of Córdoba

Silvana Micaela Ginocchio (born 10 October 1965) is an Argentine politician, currently serving as National Deputy representing Catamarca Province. Ginocchio was first elected in 2017 for Unidad Ciudadana, and currently sits in the Frente de Todos bloc.

== Early and personal life ==
Ginocchio was born on 10 October 1965 in San Fernando del Valle de Catamarca. She studied law at the National University of Córdoba, graduating in 1990. She is married to Raúl Jalil, governor of Catamarca Province and former mayor of San Fernando del Valle de Catamarca; Jalil and Ginocchio have two children.

== Political career ==
Ahead of the 2017 legislative election, Ginocchio was nominated as the second candidate in the Justicialist Front for Victory (Unidad Ciudadana) list to the Argentine Chamber of Deputies, behind Gustavo Saadi. The list received 47.84% of the votes, and both Saadi and Ginocchio were easily elected. Following the 2019 general election, Ginocchio became part of the Frente de Todos parliamentary bloc.

As deputy, Ginocchio was a vocal opponent of the legalization of abortion in Argentina, and voted against the two Voluntary Interruption of Pregnancy bills that passed the Chamber, in 2018 and 2020. In 2020, In the 2020 debate, Ginocchio was the speaker for the anti-abortion faction of the Frente de Todos during the closing statements; she was one of 32 deputies out of 119 in the Frente de Todos to vote against the bill.

Ahead of the 2021 primary election, Ginocchio was confirmed as one of the candidates for re-election in the Frente de Todos list in Catamarca.
