= Luana Volnovich =

Argentine politician

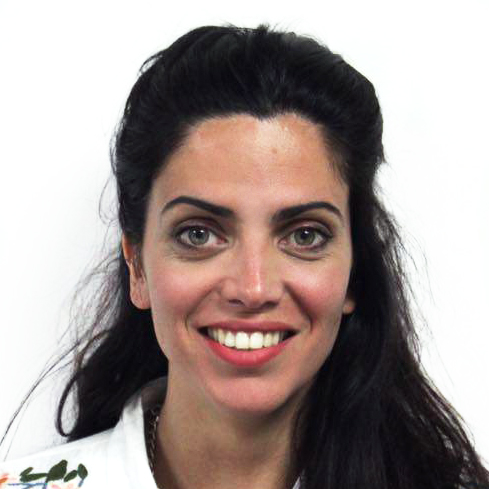

National Deputy
- Incumbent
- Assumed office 10 December 2023
- Constituency: Buenos Aires
- In office 10 December 2015 – 10 December 2019
- Constituency: Buenos Aires

Executive Director of PAMI
- In office 12 December 2019 – 10 December 2023
- President: Alberto Fernández
- Preceded by: Sergio Cassinotti
- Succeeded by: Esteban Leguizamo

Personal details
- Born: 26 September 1979 (age 47) Rio de Janeiro, Brazil
- Party: Justicialist Party
- Other political affiliations: Front for Victory (2003–2017); Citizen's Unity (2017–2019); Frente de Todos (2019–2023); Union for the Homeland (since 2023)
- Education: University of Buenos Aires

Luana Volnovich (born 26 September 1979) is an Argentine political scientist and Justicialist Party politician. She currently serves as a National Deputy elected in Buenos Aires Province, a position she previously held from 2015 to 2019.

From 2019 to 2023, during the government of Alberto Fernández, Volnovich served as the executive director of the Comprehensive Medical Attention Program (PAMI), Argentina's biggest public health insurance agency.

== Early life and education ==
Luana Volnovich was born on 26 September 1979 in Rio de Janeiro, Brazil to Argentine parents exiled during the last civic–military dictatorship in Argentina (1976–1983). The family returned to Argentina in 1989. Volnovich studied and earned a licenciatura on political science at the University of Buenos Aires (UBA). She also has a post-graduate degree in Public Policy Administration and Control from the Latin American Faculty of Social Sciences (FLACSO).

During her studies at the UBA, she co-founded the Centro de Estudios Políticos (CEP; "Centre for Political Studies") alongside the economist Iván Heyn.

== Political career ==
Volnovich was one of the founding members of La Cámpora, one of the youth wings of the Front for Victory. In 2014, during the presidency of Cristina Fernández de Kirchner, Volnovich was appointed as National Director for the enlargement and strengthening of educational rights at the Ministry of Education. Her administration saw the implementation of the Progresar and FinEs educational social assistance schemes.

At the 2015 legislative elections, Volnovich was the 12th candidate in the Front for Victory list to the Argentine Chamber of Deputies in Buenos Aires Province. The list received 37.38% of the vote, and Volnovich was elected. She was sworn in on 10 December 2015. As deputy, Volnovich voted against the Mauricio Macri administration's pension reform in 2017, and introduced a bill to overturn it after it had passed the Chamber. She also voted in favor of the Voluntary Interruption of Pregnancy bill, which would have legalized abortion in Argentina, but was struck down by the Senate on 8 August 2018.

She was re-elected at the 2019 legislative election, this time as the second candidate in the Frente de Todos list, under Sergio Massa. She was easily re-elected, but was never sworn in as she was appointed as executive director of PAMI on 12 December 2019 by incoming president Alberto Fernández. Her seat in the Chamber of Deputies was replaced by Jimena López.

== Personal life ==
Volnovich was in a relationship with the economist Iván Heyn until his death in 2011. She has a son.

== Electoral history ==
Electoral history of Luana Volnovich
Election	Office	List	#	District	Votes			Result	Ref.
Election	Office	List	#	District	Total	%	P.	Result	Ref.
2015	National Deputy	Front for Victory	11	Buenos Aires Province	3,354,619	37.28%	1st (Note: Presented on an electoral list. The data shown represents the share of the vote the entire party/alliance received in that constituency.)	Elected	
2019	National Deputy	Frente de Todos	2	Buenos Aires Province	5,113,359	52.64%	1st	Elected (Note: Never took office. Her seat was assumed by María Jimena López on 19 December 2019.)	
2023	National Deputy	Union for the Homeland	6	Buenos Aires Province	4,094,665	43.71%	1st	Elected	
