= Adriana Cáceres =

Argentine politician

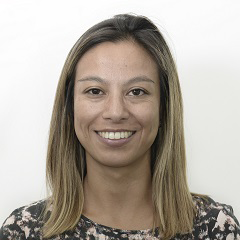

National Deputy
- In office 28 February 2020 – 10 December 2021
- Constituency: Buenos Aires

Personal details
- Born: 12 November 1982 (age 43) Tres de Febrero, Argentina
- Party: Republican Proposal
- Other political affiliations: Juntos por el Cambio (2015–present)
- Education: University of Buenos Aires

Adriana Cintia Cáceres (born 12 November 1982) is an Argentine political scientist and politician who served as a National Deputy elected in Buenos Aires Province from 2020 to 2021. She is a member of Republican Proposal (PRO).

== Early life and career ==
Cáceres was born on 12 November 1982 in Tres de Febrero, Buenos Aires Province. She finished high school at the Instituto Madre del Divino Pastor, in Pilar, where she has lived since she was five years old. She studied political science at the University of Buenos Aires, graduating in 2006. She also has a master's degree in Public Policy from Torcuato di Tella University (2011) and a post-graduate degree in Governance and Public Administration from the University of San Andrés (2013).

Cáceres is married to Adrián Sautu.

== Political career ==
Cáceres became involved in politics in Republican Proposal during Mauricio Macri's mayoral campaign in Buenos Aires in 2007. From 2014 to 2015, Cáceres was a legislative aide for Victoria Roldán Méndez at the Buenos Aires City Legislature. Later, from 2015 to 2019, she was Federal Director for Youth at the Ministry of Social Development under Minister Carolina Stanley. From March to December 2019, Cáceres was executive director of the National Youth Institute (INJUVE); she was succeeded by Macarena Sánchez.

Cáceres ran for a seat in the Chamber of Deputies in the 2017 legislative election, as the 16th candidate in the Cambiemos list in Buenos Aires Province. The list was the most voted in the general election with 42.15% of the vote, but it was not enough for Cáceres to be elected.

=== National Deputy ===
In 2019, deputy Guillermo Montenegro (who had run as the third candidate in the Cambiemos list) was elected intendente of General Pueyrredón Partido, and resigned from his seat in the Chamber. The vacancy left by Montenegro's resignation was subject to a legal dispute between Cáceres, who argued it was her right to succeed him as the next candidate in the list, and Marcelo Osmar del Sol, who argued for the retroactive application of the Gender Parity Law (Law 27.412). The Electoral Tribunal agreed with Cáceres in the case, and she was able to take office on 28 February 2020.

As a national deputy, Cáceres formed part of the parliamentary commissions on Addiction Prevention, Human Rights and Guarantees, Economy, Women and Diversity, Population and Human Development, and Consumer Rights. She was a vocal supporter of the legalization of abortion in Argentina, voting in favour of the Voluntary Interruption of Pregnancy bill that passed the Argentine Congress in 2020.
