= Ezequiel Fernández =

Ezequiel Fernández may refer to:

- Ezequiel Fernández (Panamanian politician) (1886–1946), acting president of Panama
- Ezequiel Fernández Langan (born 1978), Argentine lawyer and politician
- Ezequiel Fernández (footballer) (born 2002), Argentine footballer
