= Marcela Campagnoli =

Argentine politician (born 1957)

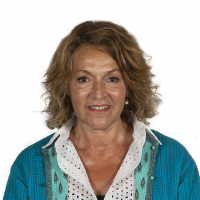

National Deputy
- Incumbent
- Assumed office 10 December 2017
- Constituency: Buenos Aires

Personal details
- Born: 11 November 1957 (age 68) Buenos Aires, Argentina
- Party: Civic Coalition ARI
- Other political affiliations: Juntos por el Cambio (2015–present)
- Education: University of Buenos Aires

Marcela Campagnoli (born 11 November 1957) is an Argentine politician, currently serving as National Deputy elected in Buenos Aires Province since 2017. She is a member of the Civic Coalition ARI, and sits in the Juntos por el Cambio parliamentary inter-bloc.

== Early life and career ==
Campagnoli was born on 11 November 1957 in Buenos Aires. She studied to be a professor of history at the Consejo Superior de Educación Católica, graduating in 1986. She then went on to complete a law degree from the University of Buenos Aires in 1996. She is married to Guillermo Iglesias, and has two children.

== Political career ==
Campagnoli was elected to the city council of Pilar in 2007, serving until 2011. Then, from 2015 to 2017, she was Secretary of Education at the municipality of Pilar, in the administration of intendente Nicolás Ducoté.

She ran for a seat in the Chamber of Deputies in the 2017 legislative election, as the fourth candidate in the Cambiemos list in Buenos Aires Province. The list was the most voted in the general election with 42.15% of the vote, and Campagnoli was elected.

As a national deputy, Campagnoli formed part of the parliamentary commissions on Criminal Legislation (of which she was appointed first vice-president), Human Rights and Guarantees, Education and Freedom of Expression. Campagnoli was an opponent of the legalization of abortion in Argentina. She voted against the two Voluntary Interruption of Pregnancy bills that were debated by the Argentine Congress in 2018 and 2020.

In April 2021, she tested positive for COVID-19.

Ahead of the 2021 primary election, Campagnoli was confirmed as one of the candidates in the "Es Juntos" list in Buenos Aires Province.

== Electoral history ==
Electoral history of Marcela Campagnoli
Election	Office	List	#	District	Votes			Result	Ref.
Election	Office	List	#	District	Total	%	P.	Result	Ref.
2017	National Deputy	Cambiemos	4	Buenos Aires Province	3,930,406	42.15%	1st (Note: Presented on an electoral list. The data shown represents the share of the vote the entire party/alliance received in that constituency.)	Elected	
2021	National Deputy	Juntos por el Cambio	4	Buenos Aires Province	3,550,321	39.77%	1st	Elected	
