= Lucila Lehmann =

Argentine politician

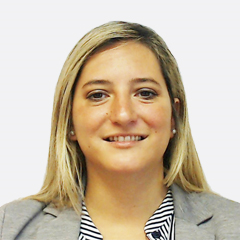

National Deputy
- In office 10 December 2017 – 10 December 2021
- Constituency: Santa Fe

Personal details
- Born: 28 May 1983 (age 43) Santa Fe, Argentina
- Party: Civic Coalition ARI
- Other political affiliations: Juntos por el Cambio (2015–present)
- Education: National University of Rosario

María Lucila Lehmann (born 28 May 1983) is an Argentine politician who was a National Deputy elected in Santa Fe from 2017 to 2021. She is a member of the Civic Coalition ARI, and sat in the Juntos por el Cambio parliamentary inter-bloc.

== Early life and career ==
Lehmann was born on 28 May 1983 in Santa Fe de la Vera Cruz. Through her father, she is a great-great-granddaughter of Guillermo Lehmann, a German-born businessman who founded many settlements in Santa Fe Province, including Rafaela. Lehmann is also granddaughter of Rodolfo Lehmann, who was governor of Santa Fe from 1916 to 1919.

She studied odontology at the National University of Rosario, graduating in 2008. She is married to Luciano Bugallo.

== Political career ==
In 2015, Lehmann was appointed to the Health Commission of the Argentine Chamber of Deputies by the Civic Coalition ARI bloc. She was also co-ordinator of the Ministry of Foreign Affairs' Youth Policies Commission from 2016 to 2017, during the presidency of Mauricio Macri.

She ran for a seat in the Chamber of Deputies in the 2017 legislative election, as the third candidate in the Cambiemos list in Santa Fe. The list was the most voted in the general election with 37.80% of the vote, and Lehmann was elected.

As a national deputy, Lehmann formed part of the parliamentary commissions on Agriculture and Livestock, Co-operative Affairs, Industrial Law and Foreign Affairs, Industry and Production, and PyMes and Corporative Social Responsibility. Lehmann was an opponent of the legalization of abortion in Argentina. She voted against the two Voluntary Interruption of Pregnancy bills that were debated by the Argentine Congress in 2018 and 2020. During the 2020 debate, she tried to have the parliamentary debate shut down on religious grounds, as she claimed to represent the "majority of citizens" of the Argentine nation who are Roman Catholic.

Ahead of the 2021 primary election, Lehmann was confirmed as one of the candidates in the "Vamos Juntos" list in Santa Fe. Vamos Juntos lost in the Juntos por el Cambio primaries, and so Lehmann lost her chance at re-election. Her term expired on 9 December 2021.
