= María Carla Piccolomini =

Argentine politician

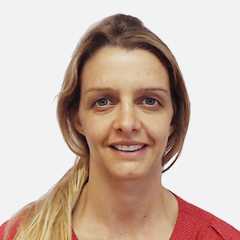

National Deputy
- In office 10 December 2017 – 10 December 2021
- Constituency: Buenos Aires

Personal details
- Born: 28 February 1980 (age 46) Mercedes, Buenos Aires Province, Argentina
- Party: Republican Proposal
- Other political affiliations: Juntos por el Cambio (2015–present)

María Carla Piccolomini (born 28 February 1980) is an Argentine politician who was a National Deputy from 2017 to 2021, elected in Buenos Aires Province. She is a member of Republican Proposal (PRO).

== Early life and career ==
Piccolomini was born on 28 February 1980 in Mercedes, in Central Buenos Aires Province. Piccolomini is married to Andrés Ibarra, former Minister of Modernization and Deputy Chief of Cabinet during the administration of President Mauricio Macri. Piccolomini and Ibarra have two children.

== Political career ==
From 2009 to 2011, Piccolomini was an advisor at the Ministry of Education of Buenos Aires. Then, from 2011 to 2015, she was Director of Institutional Communications at the city's Ministry of Modernization, then under her husband, Andrés Ibarra. She also served as Director of Institutional Affairs at Radio y Televisión Argentina from 2015 to 2017.

She ran for a seat in the Chamber of Deputies in the 2017 legislative election, as the 13th candidate in the Cambiemos list in Buenos Aires Province. The list was the most voted in the general election with 42.15% of the vote, and Piccolomini was elected.

As a national deputy, Piccolomini formed part of the parliamentary commissions on Science and Technology, Culture, Mercosur, Communications, Industry, and Disabilities. She was an opponent of the legalization of abortion in Argentina, voting against the two Voluntary Interruption of Pregnancy bills that were debated by the Argentine Congress in 2018 and 2020.

Piccolomini did not run for re-election in 2021, and her term expired on 9 December 2021.
