= Mayda Cresto =

Argentine politician (born 1972)

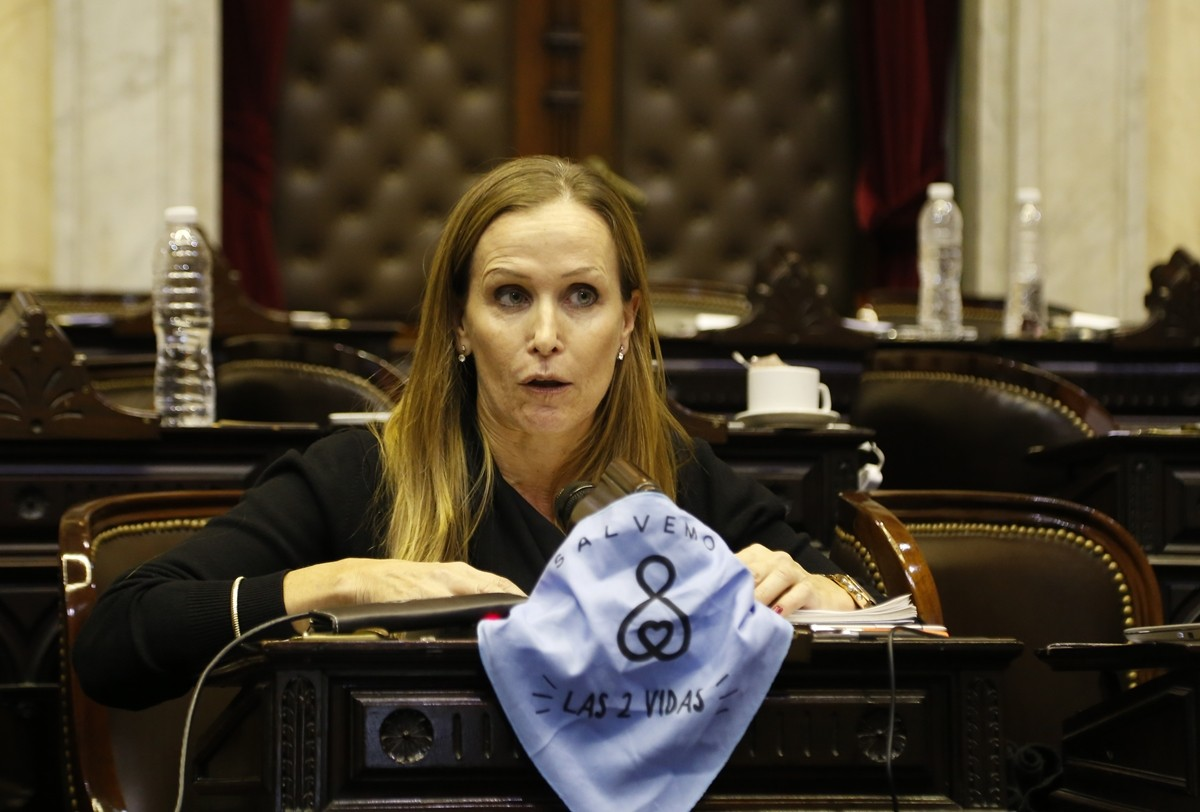

National Deputy
- In office 10 December 2017 – 10 December 2021
- Constituency: Entre Ríos

Personal details
- Born: 6 February 1972 (age 54) Concordia, Argentina
- Party: Justicialist Party
- Other political affiliations: Front for Victory (2003–2017); Frente de Todos (2019–present)
- Education: National University of the Littoral

Mayda Rosana Cresto (born 6 February 1972) is an Argentine lawyer, notary and politician. She served as a National Deputy elected in Entre Ríos from 2017 to 2021. A member of the Justicialist Party, Cresto sat in the Frente de Todos parliamentary bloc from 2019 to 2021.

== Early life and education ==
Cresto was born on 6 February 1972 in Concordia, Entre Ríos Province. She comes from a political family; both her father, Juan Carlos Cresto, and her brother, Enrique Tomás Cresto, have served as intendente (mayor) of Concordia. Her mother, Laura Martínez de Cresto, served as National Senator. Her grandfather, Enrique Tomás Cresto, was governor of Entre Ríos from 1973 to 1976.

Cresto studied law at the National University of the Littoral, graduating in 1994. She also has a notary's degree from the same university, attained in 2001. Cresto is divorced, and has three children.

== Political career ==
Cresto held a number of positions within the Justicialist Party (PJ), serving as attorney of the Paraná chapter of the PJ, and as a member of the Paraná PJ's party congress. From 2010 to 2017, she was employed at the Instituto Autarquico Becario Provincial, the provincial government's scholarship overseer.

At the 2017 legislative election, Cresto was the second candidate in the Justicialist Party list to the Chamber of Deputies, behind Juan José Bahillo. The list was the second-most voted with 37.97% of the vote, and both Bahillo and Cresto were elected. She was sworn in on 6 December 2017.

As a national deputy, Cresto presided the parliamentary commission on Petitions, Powers and Norms, and formed part of the commissions on Tourism, Public Works, Communications, Constitutional Affairs, and Sports. She was an opponent of the legalization of abortion in Argentina, voting against the two Voluntary Interruption of Pregnancy bills that were debated by the Argentine Congress in 2018 and 2020.
