= Francisco Guevara =

Argentine politician

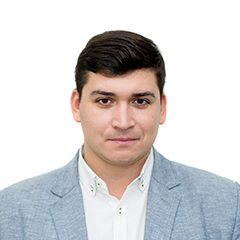

National Deputy
- In office 19 December 2019 – 10 December 2021
- Constituency: San Juan

Personal details
- Born: 18 March 1992 (age 34) San Juan, Argentina
- Party: Justicialist Party
- Other political affiliations: Frente de Todos (2019–present)

Alejandro Francisco Guevara Olivera (born 18 March 1992) is an Argentine politician who served as a National Deputy from 2019 to 2021, elected in San Juan Province. He is a member of the Justicialist Party.

== Early and personal life ==
Guevara was born on 18 March 1992 in San Juan, San Juan Province. He has been politically involved since his youth, being active in the Peronist Youth. He grew up in Rivadavia Department, and finished high school at Colegio Pérez Hernández.

Guevara has one daughter, born in 2021.

== Political career ==
Guevara began his career aged 22 as a legislative aide at the Provincial Chamber of Deputies of San Juan, later working as an advisor at the province's Ministry of Tourism and Culture. He is currently president of the Peronist Youth Congress in San Juan Province.

At the 2017 legislative election, Guevara was the first alternate candidate in the "Frente Todos" alliance, the Justicialist Party list. Following the 2019 general election, deputy Daniela Castro (who had run as the second candidate in the Frente Todos list) resigned from her position; with the other women in the list declining the position (as per the 2017 Gender Parity Law), Guevara assumed the position in Castro's place. He took office on 19 December 2019. He formed part of the Frente de Todos parliamentary bloc. At age 27, Guevara became the youngest male congressman in the 2019–2021 legislative term.

As deputy, Guevara formed part of the parliamentary commissions on Families and Childhood, Culture, Mercosur, Mining, Addiction Prevention, and Tourism. He was a supporter of the legalization of abortion in Argentina, and voted in favor of the 2020 Voluntary Interruption of Pregnancy bill, which passed the Chamber. His affirmative vote was controversial in his native San Juan; he was the only deputy from the province to vote in favour of legalizing abortion. In his speech during the debate in Congress, Guevara said he had received threats for his position. Guevara received congratulations from President Alberto Fernández following the vote.
