= Roxana Reyes =

Argentine politician

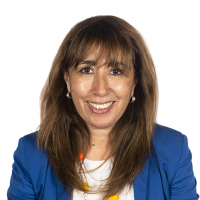

National Deputy
- Incumbent
- Assumed office 10 December 2017
- Constituency: Santa Cruz

Provincial Deputy of Santa Cruz
- In office 10 December 2015 – 10 December 2017
- Constituency: At-Large District

Personal details
- Born: 2 December 1965 (age 60) Río Gallegos, Argentina
- Party: Radical Civic Union
- Other political affiliations: Juntos por el Cambio (2015–present)
- Education: University of Belgrano

Roxana Nahir Claudia Reyes (born 2 December 1965) is an Argentine politician, currently serving as National Deputy elected in Santa Cruz since 2017. She is a member of the Radical Civic Union (UCR). Previously, from 2015 to 2017, she served as a member of the Chamber of Deputies of Santa Cruz, elected in the provincial list.

== Early and personal life ==
Reyes was born on 2 December 1965 in the capital of Santa Cruz Province, Río Gallegos. She studied law at the University of Belgrano, in Buenos Aires, graduating in 1990. She has co-owned the Reyes y Reyes law firm since 1991.

Reyes is married to Darío Raúl Hernando. She had three children. Her youngest son, Renzo Bonforte, died in 2020 in Buenos Aires, aged 23.

== Political career ==
Reyes was elected to the Chamber of Deputies of Santa Cruz in the 2015 provincial election, as part of the "Unión para Vivir Mejor" (Cambiemos) list in the at-large provincial district. She ran for a seat in the Argentine Chamber of Deputies in the 2017 legislative election, as the first candidate in the Unión para Vivir Mejor–Cambiemos list in Santa Cruz. The list was the most voted in the general election with 43.91% of the vote, and Reyes was elected, alongside the second candidate in the list, Antonio Carambia.

During her 2017–2021 term as deputy, Reyes presided the Families and Childhood commission, and was a member of the commissions on General Legislation, Maritime Interests, Energy and Fuels, Elderly People, Small and Medium-sized Companies and Mining. Reyes had a mixed record on the legalization of abortion in Argentina; she voted against the 2018 Voluntary Interruption of Pregnancy bill, which passed the Chamber but was struck down by the Senate. In 2020, however, when a similar bill was presented to the Chamber once again, Reyes changed her position and voted in favour. Her 2020 vote was highlighted by media as she insisted on casting her vote despite being on leave due to the recent passing of her son.

She was re-elected in 2021, as the first candidate in the Cambia Santa Cruz list, which received 35.09% of the vote.
