= Natalia Villa =

Argentine politician

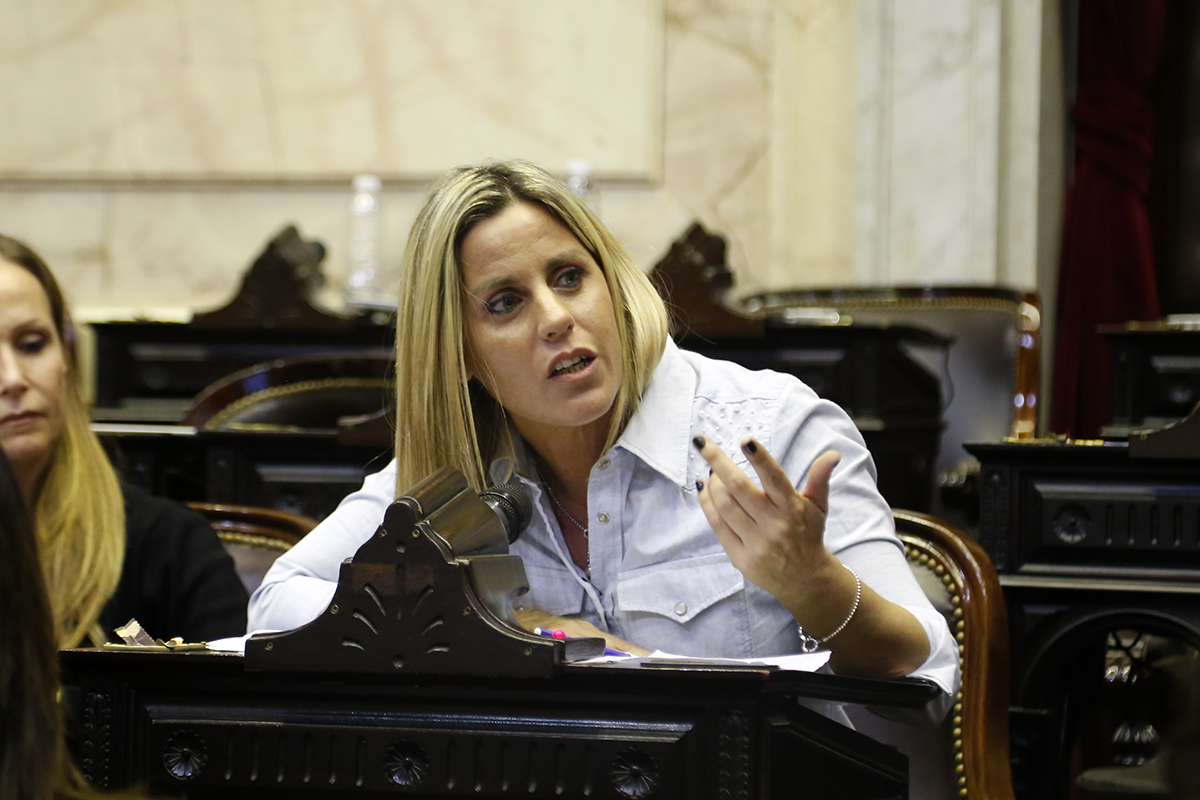

National Deputy
- In office 10 December 2017 – 10 December 2021
- Constituency: Buenos Aires

Personal details
- Born: 15 April 1979 (age 47) Vicente López, Argentina
- Party: Republican Proposal
- Other political affiliations: Juntos por el Cambio (2015–present)
- Education: University of Belgrano

Natalia Soledad Villa (born 15 April 1979) is an Argentine politician who served as a National Deputy elected in Buenos Aires Province from 2017 to 2021. She is a member of Republican Proposal (PRO). Since 2021, she has been a member of the Vicente López Partido City Council, a post she held from 2013 to 2017 as well.

== Early life and career ==
Villa was born on 15 April 1979 in Vicente López, Buenos Aires Province. She studied Political Science at the University of Belgrano, graduating in 2008.

== Political career ==
Villa was a member of the City Council of Vicente López from 2013 to 2017, concurrently serving as Director General of Foreign Affairs and Worship.

She ran for a seat in the Chamber of Deputies in the 2017 legislative election, as the 13th candidate in the Cambiemos list in Buenos Aires Province. The list was the most voted in the general election with 42.15% of the vote, and Villa was elected.

As a national deputy, Villa presided the parliamentary commission on Municipal Affairs, and formed part of the commissions on Women and Diversity, Human Rights and Guarantees, Sports, Labour Legislation, and Pensions and Social Security. She was an opponent of the legalization of abortion in Argentina, voting against the two Voluntary Interruption of Pregnancy bills that were debated by the Argentine Congress in 2018 and 2020.

Ahead of the 2021 primary elections, Villa was confirmed as the first candidate in the "Juntos" list to the Vicente López City Council, to compete within the Juntos por el Cambio alliance.
