= Juan Aicega =

Argentinian politician

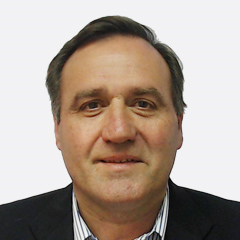
Image of Aicega taken by the Cámara de Diputados de la Nación Argentina

Juan José Miguel Aicega (Mar del Plata, June 15, 1963) is an Argentine lawyer and politician from Propuesta Republicana (PRO). He served as national deputy for the province of Buenos Aires between 2017 and 2019.

== Biography ==
He was born in Mar del Plata in 1963. He graduated as a lawyer from the National University of Mar del Plata in 1992, with a master's degree in business law from the Universidad Austral, exercising law privately.

At the party level, he is a member of Republican Proposal (PRO), being its president in the city of Mar del Plata. In 2015, with the arrival of Mauricio Macri to the presidency, he was appointed national director of Relations with the Legislative Branch of the Ministry of Justice and Human Rights of the Nation, by Germán Garavano. Between 2016 and 2017 he was a councilor for General Pueyrredón party for Unión-PRO.

In the 2017 legislative elections, he was elected national deputy, being the ninth candidate on the Cambiemos list in the province of Buenos Aires, who obtained the 42.18% of the votes.

He serves as president of the Maritime, River, Fishing and Port Interests commission and is a member of the Consumer, User and Competition Defense commissions; of National Defense; of Finance; of Petitions, Powers and Regulations; and Transportation. He opposed the legalization of abortion in Argentina, voting against the two voluntary termination of pregnancy bills that were debated by Congress in 2018 and 2020.
