= Nelly Daldovo =

Argentine politician

Member of the Chamber of Deputies of Argentina
- Incumbent
- Assumed office 19 December 2019
- Constituency: Formosa

Personal details
- Born: 21 March 1949 (age 77)
- Party: Frente de Todos
- Occupation: Teacher

Nelly Daldovo is an Argentine politician who is a member of the Chamber of Deputies.

== Biography ==
Daldovo worked as a teacher before she was elected in 2019.
