= José Luis Ramón =

Argentine politician

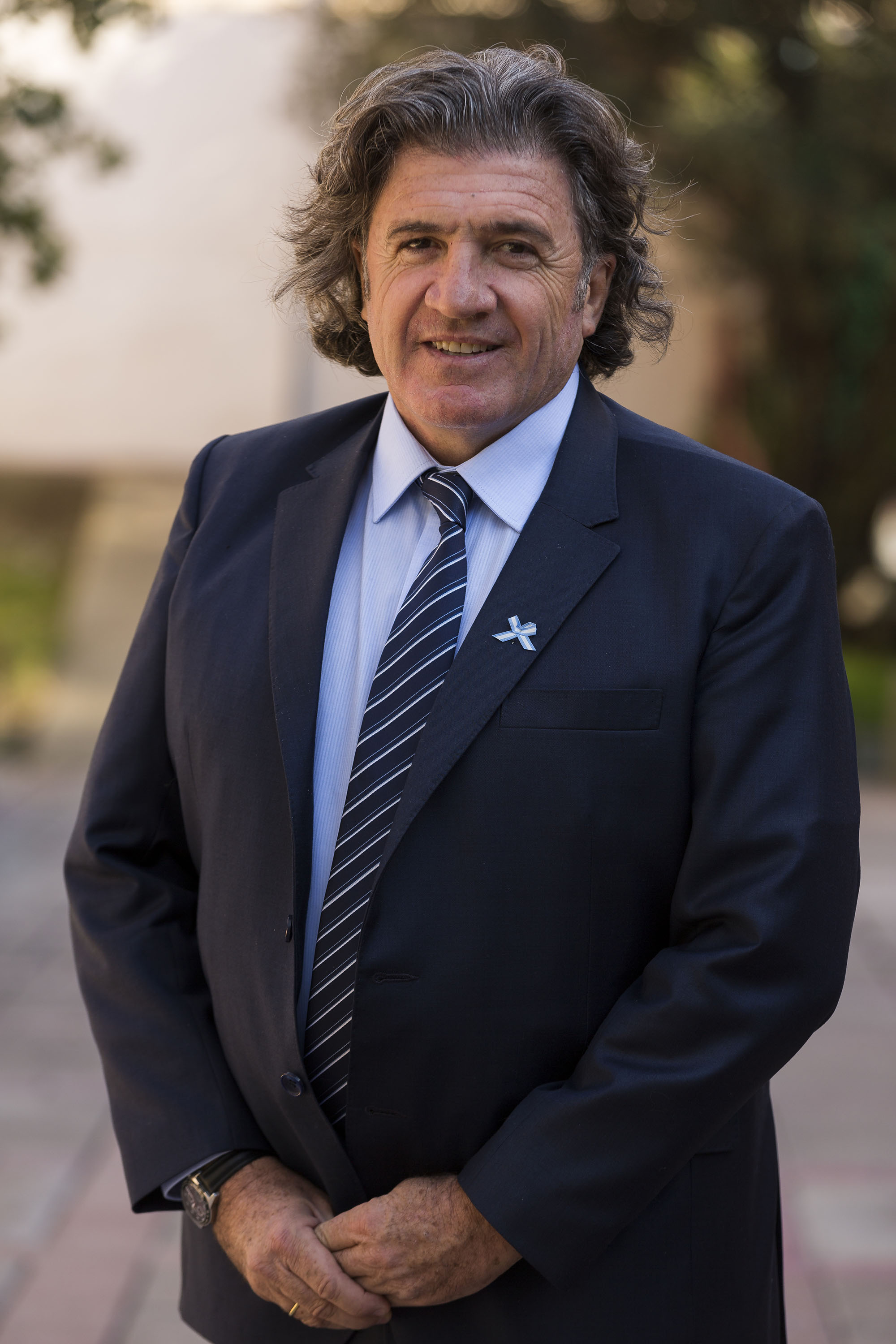

National Deputy
- In office 10 December 2017 – 10 December 2021
- Constituency: Mendoza

Personal details
- Born: 29 April 1964 (age 62) Rufino, Santa Fe Province, Argentina
- Party: Protectora
- Other political affiliations: Intransigent Party (2017); Frente de Todos (2021–present)
- Education: University of Mendoza

José Luis Ramón (born 29 April 1964) is an Argentine lawyer and politician who served as a National Deputy elected in Mendoza Province from 2017 to 2021. Ramón is the founder and leader of Protector Political Force, a provincial party in Mendoza originally established as a consumer rights advocacy group. In the Chamber of Deputies, he sat in and presided the "Federal Unity for Development" inter-bloc.

Ramón ran for the governorship of Mendoza in 2019, and was the third-most voted candidate with 8.71% of the vote.

== Early life and career ==
Ramón was born on 29 April 1964 in Rufino, Santa Fe Province. His father's job as a railway worker forced the family to relocate to Palmira, in Mendoza Province, when José Luis was young. He finished high school at the National School of Commerce in Palmira. In his youth he played rugby, and worked as a rugby trainer for some time. Ramón studied law at the University of Mendoza.

In 1994, Ramón co-founded Protectora, a consumer rights' advocacy group.

== National deputy ==
Ahead of the 2017 legislative election, Ramón – alongside Mendoza provincial deputy Mario Vadillo and Ramón's brother, Gustavo Juan Ramón – reformed Protectora into a provincially-recognized political party. Protectora formed an alliance with the Intransigent Party, and Ramón was the first candidate in the Intransigent Party's list to the National Chamber of Deputies. The Protectora – Intransigent Party list received 17.21% of the vote, and Ramón was elected.

Ramón became widely recognized due to his unconventional campaign tactics, such as the use of an old Land Rover truck dubbed as "La Ramoneta", and his use of blankets over his suit (a nod to one of his campaign issues: heating prices during winter). During his time in office, he has continued to wear a number of blankets, which has earned him the nickname of el loco de la frazada ("the crazy blanket man"). Upon being sworn in on 6 December 2017, he wore a pink blanket over his shoulder. In 2021, when a bill expanding gas and heating subsidies passed the Chamber, Ramón waved a blanket from his seat in celebration, gaining further media attention.

Ahead of the 2021 legislative election, Ramón announced his incorporation into the governing Frente de Todos.

=== Position on abortion ===
Ramón's position on the legalization of abortion in Argentina was subject of controversy. During his 2017 campaign, Ramón stated he was against legalizing the practice. Later, in 2018, he stated that despite his personal opposition, he would not vote against legalizing the practice. On 12 June 2018, however, a day before the Chamber of Deputies was due to vote on the subject for the first time, Ramón reversed his position once again and voted against the Voluntary Termination of Pregnancy Bill. His opposition caused his expulsion from the Social Democratic inter-bloc, which he had formed alongside the Evolución deputies Martín Lousteau, Carla Carrizo and Teresita Villavicencio.

In 2020, when a second Voluntary Termination of Pregnancy Bill passed the Chamber, Ramón once again voted against the legalization of abortion and instead proposed a national plebiscite on the matter.

=== 2019 gubernatorial run ===
On 28 February 2019, Ramón announced he would be running for the governorship of Mendoza in the Protectora Fuerza Política list. He was widely seen as a potential second-runner up. On election day, he faced off City of Mendoza mayor Rodolfo Suárez (of the UCR) and National Senator Anabel Fernández Sagasti (of the PJ), and came in third with 8.71% of the vote.
