= Ezequiel Fernández Langan =

Argentine politician

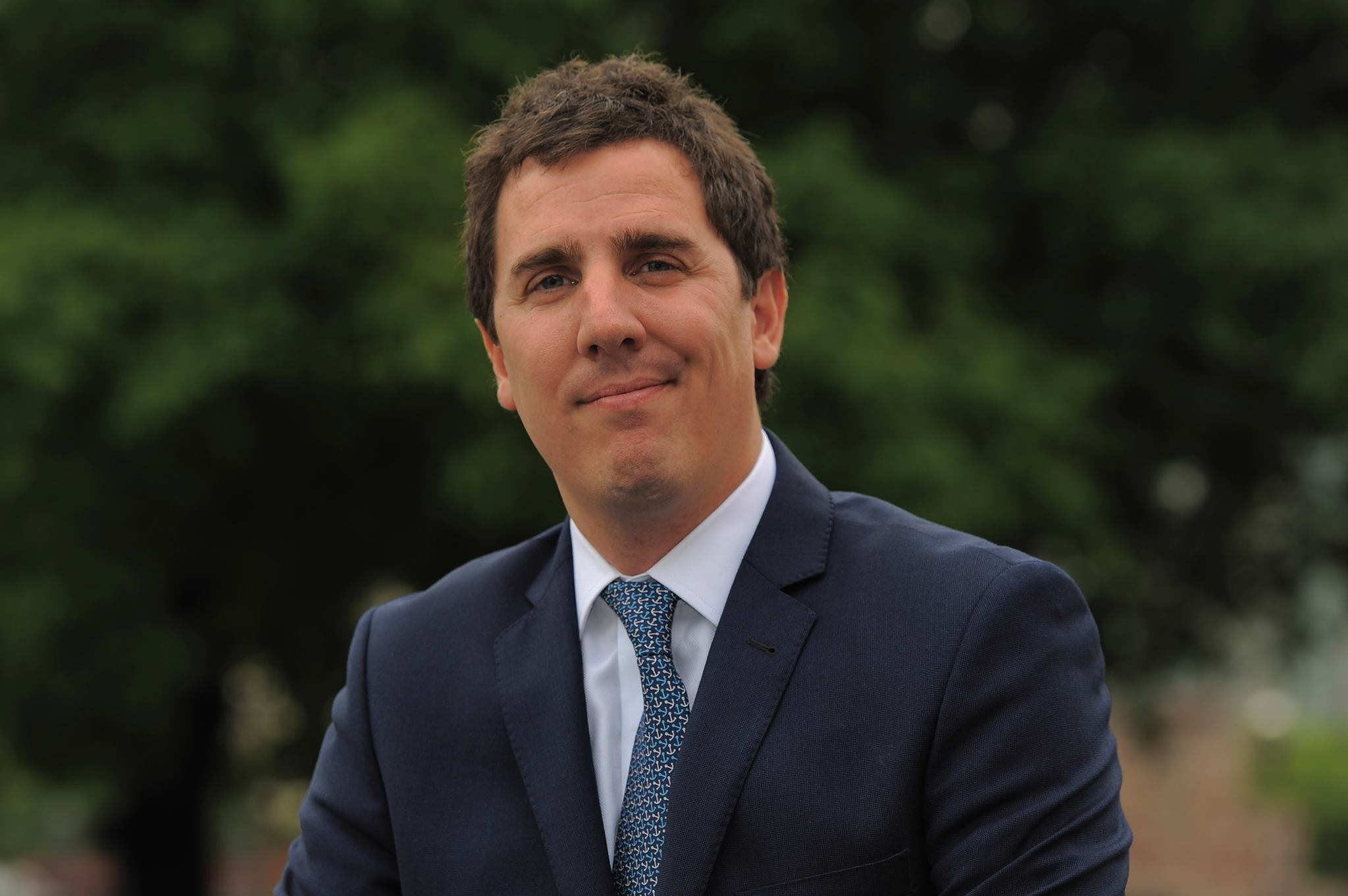

National Deputy
- In office 10 December 2017 – 10 December 2021
- Constituency: Buenos Aires

Legislator of the City of Buenos Aires
- In office 3 March 2011 – 12 January 2012

Personal details
- Born: 20 July 1978 (age 48) Buenos Aires, Argentina
- Party: Republican Proposal
- Other political affiliations: Juntos por el Cambio (2015–present)
- Education: Universidad del Salvador

Ezequiel Martín Fernández Langan (born 20 July 1978) is an Argentine lawyer and politician who was a National Deputy from 2017 to 2021, elected in Buenos Aires Province. A member of Republican Proposal (PRO), Fernández Langan previously served as a member of the Buenos Aires City Legislature from 2011 to 2012.

== Early life and education ==
Fernández Langan was born on 20 July 1978 in Buenos Aires. He studied law at the Universidad del Salvador, graduating in 2005, and has a degree on State Contracts and Public Infrastructure from Universidad Austral. He is married and has two children.

== Political career ==
Fernández Langan's career began as an advisor to Gabriela Michetti in the Buenos Aires City Legislature, in 2003. From 2005 to 2007, he was president of Jóvenes PRO, the youth wing of Republican Proposal, in Buenos Aires. Later, from 2007 to 2011, he was General Director of Youth Policies in the Buenos Aires City Government.

Fernández Langan ran for a seat in the City Legislature in the 2009 legislative election, as the 17th candidate in the PRO list. The list received 31.30% of the vote, not enough for Fernández Langan to be elected. He later took office in replacement of Gerardo Ingaramo, who died in 2011. In 2012, he was appointed Director of Autopistas Urbanas Sociedad Anónima (AUSA), a post he held until 2015. Later, from 2015 to 2017, he was Undersecretary of Electoral Affairs at the Ministry of the Interior, under Rogelio Frigerio.

=== National Deputy ===
Fernández Langan ran for a seat in the Argentine Chamber of Deputies in the 2017 legislative election; he was the 12th candidate in the Vamos Juntos (Cambiemos) list in Buenos Aires Province. The list was the most voted in the general election with 42.15% of the vote, and Fernández Langan was elected.

As a national deputy, Fernández Langan formed part of the parliamentary commissions on Fuels and Energy, Consumer Rights, Ecology, Electoral Affairs and Communications. He was an opponent of the legalization of abortion in Argentina. He voted against the two Voluntary Interruption of Pregnancy bills that were debated by the Argentine Congress in 2018 and 2020.

Fernández Langan did not run for re-election in 2021, and his term expired on 9 December 2021.
