= Ramiro Fernández Patri =

Argentine politician

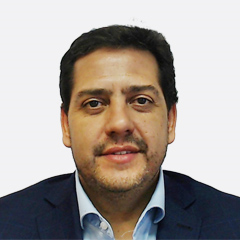

National Deputy
- Incumbent
- Assumed office 10 December 2021
- Constituency: Formosa

Personal details
- Born: 9 December 1974 (age 51)
- Party: Frente de Todos

Ramiro Fernández Patri is an Argentine politician who is a member of the Chamber of Deputies of Argentina since 2021.

== Biography ==
He had studied at the University of Buenos Aires and was elected in 2021.
