= Paulo Cassinerio =

Argentine politician (born 1953)

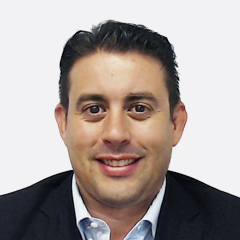

National Deputy
- In office 10 December 2017 – 10 December 2021
- Constituency: Córdoba

Personal details
- Born: 17 June 1979 (age 46) Córdoba, Argentina
- Party: Justicialist Party
- Other political affiliations: Union for Córdoba (until 2019); We Do for Córdoba (since 2019)

Paulo Leonardo Cassinerio (born 27 October 1953) is an Argentine politician who served as a National Deputy elected in Córdoba Province from 2017 to 2021. A member of the Justicialist Party, Cassinerio forms part of the provincial Hacemos por Córdoba (HPC) alliance.

Cassinerio's first political position was as coordinator of the "Volver al Trabajo" ("Return to Work") programme at the Córdoba provincial government, from 2002 to 2004. In 2005, he was appointed general coordinator of the Youth Programme at the Youth Secretariat of the provincial government. From 2011 to 2017, he worked at the Córdoba municipal government.

Cassinerio ran for a seat in the lower house of the National Congress in the 2017 legislative election, as the third candidate in the Union for Córdoba list. The list was the second-most voted in the province, with 30.52% of the vote, and Cassinerio was elected.

As a national deputy, Cassinerio formed part of the parliamentary commissions on Sports, Budget and Treasury, and Addiction Prevention. Cassinerio was an opponent of the legalization of abortion in Argentina, voting against the two Voluntary Interruption of Pregnancy bills, which passed the Chamber in 2018 and 2020.
