= Carmen Polledo =

Argentine politician

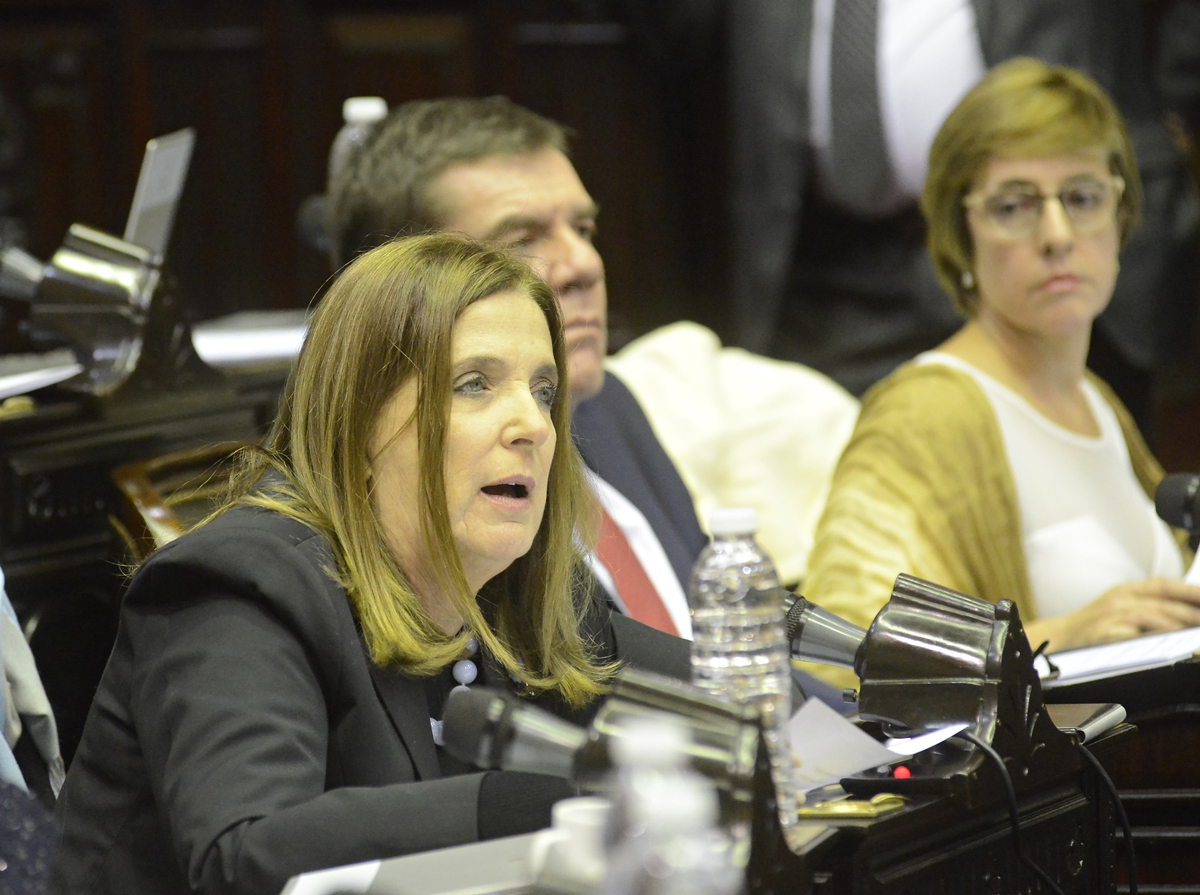

National Deputy
- In office 10 December 2017 – 10 December 2021
- Constituency: City of Buenos Aires

Legislator of the City of Buenos Aires
- In office 10 December 2009 – 10 December 2017

Personal details
- Born: 14 November 1952 (age 73) Buenos Aires, Argentina
- Party: Republican Proposal
- Other political affiliations: Juntos por el Cambio (2015–present)

Carmen Amorim Uribelarrea de Polledo (born 14 November 1952) better known as Carmen Polledo, is an Argentine politician who served as a National Deputy elected in the Federal Capital from 2017 to 2021. She is a member of Republican Proposal (PRO), and sits in the Juntos por el Cambio inter-bloc. She previously served as a member of the Buenos Aires City Legislature from 2009 to 2017.

== Early life and career ==
Carmen Amorim Uribelarrea was born on 14 November 1952 in Buenos Aires , to a family descended from the Anchorenas, an old aristocratic family of Buenos Aires. In 1989 she became involved with Cooperadora de Acción Social (COAS), an NGO focused on social assistance in public hospitals of Buenos Aires; she served as the organization president from 1999 to 2009. She is married to Fernando Polledo and has three children.

== Political career ==
Polledo began her political career in Republican Proposal. In 2009, she ran for a seat in the Buenos Aires City Legislature, as the fifth candidate in the Unión PRO list. The list received 31.30% of the vote, and Polledo was elected. As legislator, Polledo was elected First Vice President of the Legislature, becoming the first woman to hold the position. She was re-elected in 2013 as the third candidate in the PRO list. The list received 33.58% of the vote.

She ran for a seat in the Chamber of Deputies in the 2017 legislative election, as the second candidate in the Vamos Juntos (Cambiemos) list, behind Elisa Carrió. The list was the most voted on the general election with 50.98% of the vote, and Polledo was elected.

As a national deputy, Polledo formed part of the parliamentary commissions on Social Action and Public Health (which she presided over), Commerce, Consumer Rights, Political Trials, Petitions, Powers and Norms, Budget, and Foreign Affairs. She was an opponent of the legalization of abortion in Argentina. She voted against the two Voluntary Interruption of Pregnancy bills that were debated by the Argentine Congress in 2018 and 2020. During the 2020 debate, she was the spokesperson for the commission's dissent position.

In 2016, she was named in the Panama Papers as the owner of an offshore firm.
