= Estela Regidor =

Argentine politician

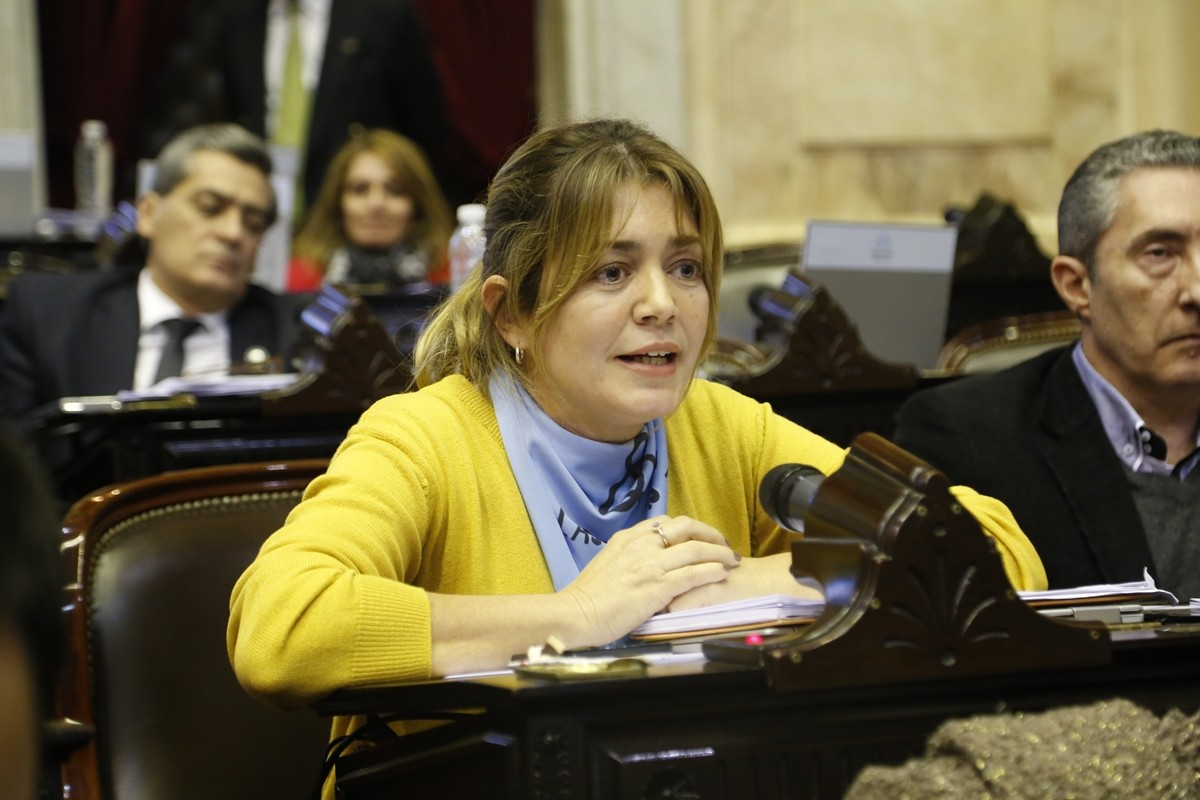

National Deputy
- In office 10 December 2017 – 10 December 2021
- Constituency: Corrientes

Personal details
- Born: 24 March 1970 (age 56) Mercedes, Corrientes Province, Argentina
- Party: Radical Civic Union
- Other political affiliations: Encuentro por Corrientes (2009–present); Juntos por el Cambio (2015–present)
- Education: University of Buenos Aires

Estela Mercedes Regidor Belledone (born 24 March 1970) is an Argentine politician who served as a National Deputy elected in Corrientes Province. A member of the Radical Civic Union, Regidor was elected at the 2017 legislative election.

== Early and personal life ==
Regidor Belledone was born on 24 March 1970 in Mercedes, in Central Corrientes Province. She studied law at the University of Buenos Aires, graduating in 1998, and specialized on pension law.

== Political career ==
Regidor was appointed comptroller of the Social Prevision Institute (IPS, Instituto de Previsión Social) of Corrientes Province in 2009. In 2016, she was appointed head of the Comprehensive Attention Unit of ANSES in Corrientes Province.

At the 2017 legislative election, Regidor was the first candidate in the Encuentro por Corrientes (ECO)–Cambiemos list. The list was the most voted in the province, with 55.43% of the vote, and Regidor was easily elected.

As national deputy, Regidor formed part of the parliamentary commissions on Pensions and Social Security, Labour Legislation, Political Trials, Families and Childhood, and Elderly People. She was a vocal opponent of the legalization of abortion in Argentina, voting against the two Voluntary Interruption of Pregnancy bills that were debated by the Argentine Congress in 2018 and 2020. During her speech during the debate on the 2018 bill, she made a controversial analogy with dogs, stating that "when our dogs get pregnant, we don't take them to the vet for them to have an abortion; we give away the pups." She later introduced an unsuccessful bill to establish an "early adoption" programme.

In 2021, Regidor caused controversy when leaked voice notes between her and her legislative aides revealed she was extorting her staff to take up to 50% of their salaries. The scandal led to her taking an unpaid leave from her position in the Chamber of Deputies. She also presented herself to a Corrientes tribunal for investigation.
