= Sofía Brambilla =

Argentine politician

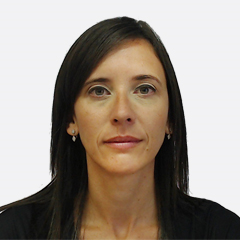

Member of the Chamber of Deputies of Argentina
- Incumbent
- Assumed office 10 December 2019

Personal details
- Born: 16 March 1980 (age 46)
- Party: Republican Proposal
- Occupation: Graduate in Political Science

Sofía Brambilla is an Argentine politician who is a member of the Chamber of Deputies of Argentina.

== Biography ==
Brambilla worked in political science.
