= Guillermo Montenegro =

Argentine lawyer, judge and politician

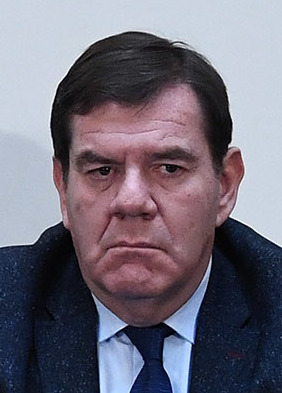
Guillermo Montenegro in 2019.

Guillermo Montenegro (born 30 December 1962) is an Argentine lawyer, former judge and politician.

Montenegro was born in Mar del Plata. In the course of his career, he served as federal judge, dealing with notorious cases, such as IBM-Banco Nación.

In 2007 he resigned in order to accept the post of Security Minister of the City of Buenos Aires in Mauricio Macri's city government.

In December 2015 he was appointed to be the Argentine ambassador to Uruguay.

He was deputy of the National Congress of Argentina from 2017 to 2019, when he assumed as the mayor of General Pueyrredón Partido.
