= Adriana Puiggrós =

Argentine writer, academic and politician

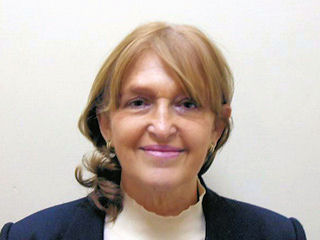
- Puiggrós in 2011
- Born: September 12, 1941 (age 85); Buenos Aires, Argentina
- Occupations: Politician, writer and academic

Adriana Victoria Puiggrós (Spanish pronunciation: [aˈðɾjana βikˈtoɾja pwiˈɣɾos]; born September 12, 1941) is an Argentine writer, academic and politician.

== Life ==
Puiggrós was born in Buenos Aires in 1941. Her father was Rodolfo Puiggrós who was a historian and a communist. He changed political direction and joined the Peronist party, which was anti-Marxist, during the 1950s. Her father became the rector of the University of Buenos Aires in the early 1970s and Adriana was elected dean of the Philosophy faculty.

She is a member of the Broad Front political party and on 17 December 2011 she was elected president of the party with Alberto Weretilneck as vice-president.

In 2021 she was an adviser to the President Alberto Fernández. She was involved in a dispute over when to get children to return to school during the pandemic. Horacio Rodríguez Larreta was arguing for a date in mid February, but Puiggros argued that it should be delayed until March when the teachers could be vaccinated.
