= Citizen's Unity =

Former political coalition in Argentina

Citizen's Unity Unidad Ciudadana
- Abbreviation: UC
- Leader: Cristina Fernández de Kirchner
- Founded: 20 June 2017
- Dissolved: 12 June 2019
- Preceded by: Front for Victory
- Succeeded by: Frente de Todos
- Headquarters: Buenos Aires
- Youth wing: La Cámpora
- Ideology: Peronism; Social democracy Kirchnerism
- Political position: Centre-left to left-wing

Website
- www.unidadciudadana.org

Citizen's Unity (Spanish: Unidad Ciudadana) was a centre-left Kirchnerist political coalition in Argentina for the 2017 legislative elections led by the former President Cristina Fernández de Kirchner.

This coalition existed in the provinces of Buenos Aires, Catamarca, Chaco, Córdoba, Misiones, Neuquén, Entre Ríos and Buenos Aires.

The political force launched a campaign against the "retirement adjustment and labor flexibility that the government of Mauricio Macri is trying to impose."

The result was a victory for the ruling Cambiemos alliance, being the most voted force in 13 of the 24 districts.

== Creation ==
After finishing her second term, former President Cristina Fernández de Kirchner proposed the creation of a coalition of forces opposing Mauricio Macri's ruling party. By her own words, the coalition was created to «unite the citizens in order to limit (the power of) the President Mauricio Macri and to avoid the elimination of the social rights acquired (during the past administrations)».

Another concern was the conduct of several legislators elected under the former Front for Victory (Spanish: Frente para la Victoria) of approving the laws passed by President Macri's party. The proposal is to guarantee that no legislator elected could vote laws against the Citizen's Unity political program.

The name of the party was contested by a minor local party, the "Agrupación Vecinal Unidad Ciudadana", on the grounds that it is similar to their own name.

== Proposals ==
=== Electoral platform ===
The 15 points of the Citizen Unity campaign platform promoted by Cristina Kirchner:

1. Recover what was lost: employment, salary and working conditions.
2. Stop the uncontrolled increase in the prices of popular consumption.
3. Protect the national industry.
4. Put an end to tariff looting and defend national public companies.
5. Defense of the social security system and return of rights to retirees and pensioners.
6. Stop the snowball of external indebtedness and the "financial bicycle". Review the debt incurred.
7. Oxygen to regional economies and small and medium agricultural producers.
8. Fair and transparent distribution of resources to the Provinces, which ensures federalism and autonomy.
9. Something more than corruption: ARGENTINA S.A.
10. Woman. Equal and Alive.
11. Human Rights. Argentina without political prisoners and without free genocides.
12. Security.
13. The State to balance the balance between society and the market.
14. Private appropriation and foreignization of natural resources.
15. Productive regional integration to defend sovereignty.

== Member parties ==
Party	Leader	Ideology
Broad Front	Adriana Puiggrós	Social democracy
Federal Commitment	Alberto Rodríguez Saá	Federal Peronism
Kolina	Alicia Kirchner	Kirchnerism
New Encounter	Martín Sabbatella	Progressivism
Victory Party	Diana Conti	Kirchnerism
Solidary Party	Carlos Heller	Co-operatism
National Alfonsinist Movement	Leopoldo Moreau	Social democracy
Communist Party	Victor Kot	Communism
Communist Party (Extraordinary Congress)	Pablo Pereyra	Communism
Revolutionary Communist Party	Juan Carlos Alderete	Communism
