= Frente de Todos =

Political coalition in Argentina

Everyone's Front Frente de Todos
- Abbreviation: FdT
- Leaders: Alberto Fernández; Cristina Fernández de Kirchner
- Founded: 12 June 2019; 7 years ago
- Dissolved: 14 June 2023; 3 years ago
- Preceded by: Citizen's Unity
- Succeeded by: Union for the Homeland
- Headquarters: Riobamba 460 2.º A, Buenos Aires
- Ideology: Peronism; Kirchnerism; Social democracy; Left-wing populism; Progressivism; Minority: Nationalism; Socialism of the 21st century; Communism; K Radicalism
- Political position: Centre-left to left-wing

The Frente de Todos (translated as "Everyone's Front") was a centre-left political coalition of political parties in Argentina formed to support President Alberto Fernández and Vice President Cristina Kirchner.

Fernández won the 2019 general election with over 48% of the vote, defeating incumbent Mauricio Macri in the first round. The coalition currently holds a minority in both the Argentine Senate and the Chamber of Deputies; in both houses it is conformed as a unified bloc. It was replaced by Unión por la Patria in June 2023, in order to compete in the general election on October of that year.

== Ideology ==
The Frente de Todos is a coalition that seeks to create a union of all sectors of Peronism (including Kirchnerism), progressivism and social democracy, including centrist political parties, centre-left and left-wing, in order to avoid the continuation of the Mauricio Macri presidency.

The front has the support of most of the labor unions, such as the General Confederation of Labour (CGT) and the Argentine Workers' Central Union (CTA), as well as many social organizations known as piqueteros.

== History ==
After former Vice President Daniel Scioli's defeat in the 2015 general election and the subsequent fragmentation of Peronism, former President Cristina Fernández de Kirchner created a new movement, called Citizen's Unity, which sought to win a majority in Congress and defeat the ruling Cambiemos coalition. However, in the 2017 legislative election, Citizen's Unity only came second with 25.21% of the votes.

On 12 June 2019, the Peronist Front for All coalition was announced through a video that was posted on the official social media accounts of Alberto Fernández and Cristina Kirchner.

In the primary elections of 11 August 2019, the coalition won with 49.49% compared to 32.94% for Juntos por el Cambio. Again in the 27 October elections, Alberto Fernandez won, with 48.24%, compared to 40.28% for Juntos por el Cambio.

On 10 December 2019, with a huge march in favor of the new government, Alberto Fernández and Cristina Fernández de Kirchner, sworn-in in as President and Vice President of Argentina. At nightfall, in the Casa Rosada, the assumption of the new president was celebrated with dances, lights, fireworks and speeches.

=== 2021 post-electoral crisis ===
The coalition suffered a severe internal crisis after the holding of the primaries in the 2021 Argentine legislative election. It occurred after the results of said primary, in which the front was defeated in the main districts, particularly in the City of Buenos Aires and the Buenos Aires province. Three days later, on September 15, eight officials, all of them aligned with Vice President Cristina Fernández, made their resignation available to President Fernández. The list of the first resigners includes Eduardo de Pedro, Martín Soria, Roberto Salvarezza, Luana Volnovich, Fernanda Raverta, Tristán Bauer, Paula Español and Juan Cabandié.

On 14 November 2021, Frente de Todos lost its majority in Congress for the first time in almost 40 years in midterm legislative elections. The election victory of the center-right coalition, Juntos por el Cambio (Together for Change), meant a tough final two years in office for President Alberto Fernández. Losing control of the Senate made it difficult for him to make key appointments, including to the judiciary. While it remained the largest force in Congress, it also forced him to negotiate with the opposition every initiative he sends to the legislature.

In April 2023, President Alberto Fernandez announced that he will not seek re-election in the next presidential election.

== Member parties ==
Party	Leader	Ideology
Justicialist Party	Alberto Fernández	Peronism
Renewal Front	Sergio Massa	Peronism; Syncretism
Party of Culture, Education and Labour	Hugo Moyano	Peronism; Labourism
Federal Commitment	Alberto Rodríguez Saá	Peronism
Kolina	Alicia Kirchner	Kirchnerism
Victory Party	Diana Conti	Social democracy Kirchnerism
New Encounter	Martín Sabbatella	Progressivism
Somos	Victoria Donda	Socialist feminism
Proyecto Sur	Jorge Selser	Progressivism
Broad Front	Adriana Puiggrós	Kirchnerism; Social democracy Peronism
Solidary Party	Carlos Heller	Co-operatism; Socialism
Popular Unity	Víctor De Gennaro	Socialism of the 21st century Left-wing nationalism
National Alfonsinist Movement	Leopoldo Moreau	Social democracy K Radicalism
FORJA	Gustavo Fernando López	Social democracy K Radicalism
Communist Party	Victor Kot	Communism; Marxism–Leninism; Guevarism
Communist Party (Extraordinary Congress)	Pablo Pereyra	Communism; Marxism–Leninism
Revolutionary Communist Party	Juan Carlos Alderete	Communism; Marxism–Leninism–Maoism
Intransigent Party	Enrique Gustavo Cardesa	Democratic socialism
Patria Grande Front	Juan Grabois	Socialism of the 21st century Feminism; Kirchnerism
La patria de los comunes	Emilio Pérsico	Kirchnerism
Protector Political Force	José Luis Ramón	Social democracy

== Electoral performance ==
=== President ===
Election year	Candidate(s)	First Round		Second Round		Result
Election year	Candidate(s)	No. votes	% vote	No. votes	% vote	Result
2019	Alberto Fernández	12,946,037	48.24	—N/a		✓ Elected

=== Legislative elections ===
==== Chamber of Deputies ====
Election year	votes	%	seats won	Total seats	Position	Note
2019	11,606,411	45.26	64 / 130	119 / 257	Minority	Includes the FCxS
2021	7,801,865	33.57	50 / 127	118 / 257	Minority	Includes the FCxS

==== Senate ====
Election year	votes	%	seats won	Total seats	Position	Note
2019	2,609,017	46.30	15 / 24	41 / 72	Majority	Includes the FCxS
2021	1,916,759	27.54	9 / 24	35 / 72	Minority	Includes the FCxS

== See also ==
- Front for Victory
- Citizen's Unity
- Justicialist Party
