= Voluntary Interruption of Pregnancy Law (Argentina) =

Argentine abortion bill passed in 2020

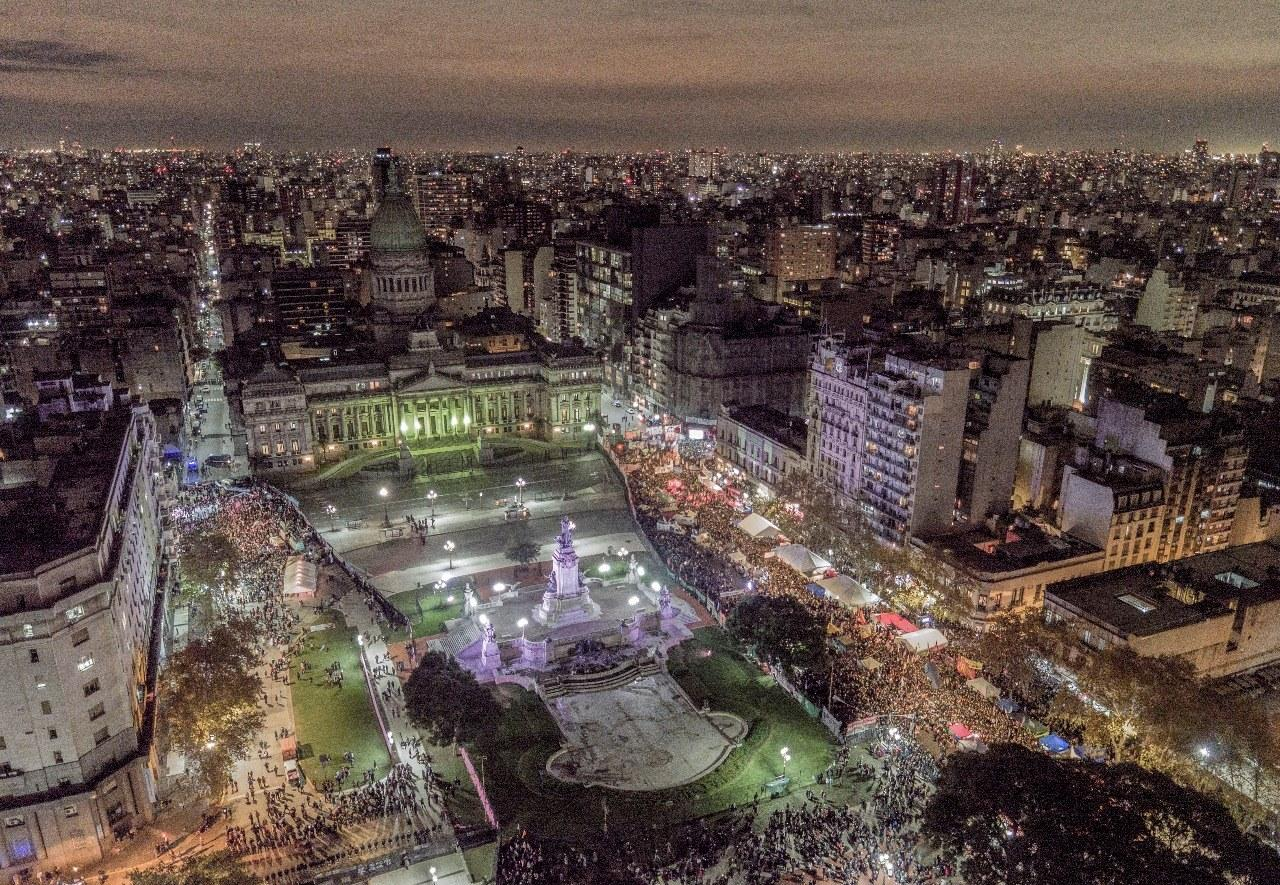
Demonstration at the Congressional Plaza in Buenos Aires during the treatment of the IVE bill by the Chamber of Deputies on 13 June 2018.

The Voluntary Interruption of Pregnancy Law (Spanish: Ley de Interrupción Voluntaria del Embarazo; IVE) was approved by the National Congress of Argentina in 2020, legalizing abortion in Argentina. The first draft of the bill was created in 2006 by the National Campaign for the Right to Legal, Safe, and Free Abortion (Campaña Nacional por el Derecho al Aborto Legal, Seguro y Gratuito), which sought to have Congress consider it in seven different occasions, to no avail.

In 2018, the bill was introduced into the legislative agenda, with the approval of then-PRO president Mauricio Macri, who was personally against it. It was approved by the Chamber of Deputies by a 129 to 125 margin on 13 June 2018, but failed to pass the Senate on 8 August 2018 by a 38 to 31 margin.

In 2020, the bill was sent to Congress once again (with some modifications) by the administration of new Justicialist Party president Alberto Fernández, who explicitly backed the initiative. It was approved by the Chamber of Deputies on 11 December by a 131 to 117 margin, and by the Senate on 30 December 2020 by a 38 to 29 margin, effectively legalizing abortion in Argentina. The law made Argentina the third (and the first major) Latin American nation to legalize abortion, after Uruguay and Cuba.

== Contents ==
The text of the bill only uses the term "abortion" when it makes references to articles of the penal code that would be modified. In all other cases, it uses the term "voluntary termination of pregnancy". It also makes reference to both women and people that may become pregnant, in reference to cases of transgender pregnancy.

An abortion may be performed during the first 14 weeks of pregnancy, with no requirements other than the woman's desire. After that point, an abortion may be performed in the case of rape, risk to the life or health of the woman, or risk of stillbirth. Those three cases may allow abortion at any point of the pregnancy, even in its last stages. In the case of rape, a woman only needs to sign an oath, without needing to make a criminal complaint. Minors do not require parental authorization to abort. There is no limit on the number of times a woman may perform abortions.

Once the woman informs her desire to abort, the health-care facility has a maximum of five days to perform it. The pre-abortion interviews are restricted to information about abortion methods, and may not attempt to discourage the woman from aborting. The process must keep the identity of the woman confidential. All health-care facilities, both public and private, must guarantee to perform abortions in the time required, and for free. Judicial authorizations are not needed.

Medics are allowed to claim themselves conscientious objectors, by signing a registry beforehand. This can only be done on a personal level, and health-care facilities are not allowed to do so, even those founded by religious organizations.

The bill also instructs the establishment of sex education in schools and policies to prevent unwanted pregnancies. It also requires the collection of abortion-related statistics.

The sanctions in the penal code remain for the cases when a medic performs an abortion without the woman's authorization. A medic that performs an abortion after the 15th week of pregnancy without it being among the accepted cases may be sentenced to prison, from three months to a year. A medic who delays, obstructs, or refuses to perform an abortion may be sentenced to prison, from six months to two years, and disqualified from legal practice of medicine for twice the length of the sentence. If this refusal led to the birth of the baby, the prison term is to be from two to five years.

== Parliamentary treatment ==
=== 2018 bill ===
President Mauricio Macri encouraged the discussion of an abortion law during the 2018 opening of regular sessions of the National Congress of Argentina. After some months of abortion debate in the media, the bill was approved by the internal commissions of the Argentine Chamber of Deputies for general legislation, health, penal legislation, and family. It was approved by 64 to 57 votes, which allowed it to be discussed by the chamber itself. The bill was approved by the Argentine Chamber of Deputies by a narrow margin of 129 to 125 votes. The proposal divided both the legislators of Cambiemos and the Justicialist Party. The project was again approved by the internal commissions to be debated in the Chamber of Deputies in 2019.

== Political reactions ==
=== Cambiemos ===
Elisa Carrió, one of the most influential figures of Cambiemos, is strongly opposed to the right to abortion. She suspected that some legislators were instructed to vote in support of the bill, and threatened to leave the coalition.

Víctor Fernández, archbishop of La Plata, asked the president to use a veto against the law, if he was truly against abortion. Marcos Peña, chief of the cabinet of ministers, confirmed that Macri would honor the result of the discussion, and would not veto the bill if approved.

=== Peronism ===
The Peronist factions in Argentina (the Justicialist Party, the Renewal Front, and the Front for Victory) are also divided over the project. During the preliminary discussions in the Senate, there were conflicting views over the chance of doctors refusing to perform abortions as conscientious objectors. Miguel Pichetto opposed it, claiming that everybody should obey the law. José Mayans considered instead that a state-enforced killing would be similar to a capital punishment, which is not allowed in the Argentine legislation.

Senator Guillermo Snopek, who is against abortion, requested that the minister of health, Adolfo Rubinstein, was not to be allowed to make a speech during the preliminary discussions in the senate. He considered that such a speech could influence the legislators, and be a breach to the separation of powers. He also accused him of having ties with the International Planned Parenthood Federation. The request was dismissed, and Rubinstein made his speech without problems. He clarified that he was not talking in the name of the government, but just of the ministry of health, and that he only intended to provide relevant statistics, and not engage in the moral aspects of the abortion debate.

== See also ==
- Abortion in Argentina
