= List of Argentine deputies, 2023–2025 =

This is a list of members of the Argentine Chamber of Deputies from 10 December 2023 to 10 December 2025.

== Composition ==
=== By province ===
Province	Deputies	Population (2010)
Buenos Aires	70	15,625,084
Buenos Aires City	25	2,890,151
Catamarca	5	367,828
Chaco	7	1,053,466
Chubut	5	506,668
Córdoba	18	3,304,825
Corrientes	7	993,338
Entre Ríos	9	1,236,300
Formosa	5	527,895
Jujuy	6	672,260
La Pampa	5	316,940
La Rioja	5	331,847
Mendoza	10	1,741,610
Misiones	7	1,097,829
Neuquén	5	550,334
Río Negro	5	633,374
Salta	7	1,215,207
San Juan	6	680,427
San Luis	5	431,588
Santa Cruz	5	272,524
Santa Fe	19	3,200,736
Santiago del Estero	7	896,461
Tierra del Fuego	5	126,190
Tucumán	9	1,448,200

=== By political groups ===
Composition of the Chamber by political groups.

Inter-bloc	Bloc	Leader
Union for the Homeland (98)		Germán Martínez
La Libertad Avanza (42)	La Libertad Avanza (39)	Gabriel Bornoroni
La Libertad Avanza (42)	Integration and Development Movement (3)	Oscar Zago
PRO (37)		Cristian Ritondo
Radical Civic Union (33)	Radical Civic Union (20)	Rodrigo de Loredo
Radical Civic Union (33)	Democracy Forever (12)	Pablo Juliano
Radical Civic Union (33)	United (1)	Mario Barletta
Hacemos Federal Coalition (15)		Miguel Ángel Pichetto
Federal Innovation (8)		Pamela Calletti
Civic Coalition (6)		Juan Manuel López
FIT - Unity (5)	PTS-FIT Unidad (3)	Nicolás del Caño
FIT - Unity (5)	Socialist Left FIT-Unity (1)	Mónica Schlotthauer
FIT - Unity (5)	Workers' Party - FIT - Unity (1)	Vanina Biasi
Independence Bloc (3)		Agustín Fernández
For Santa Cruz (2)		Sergio Acevedo
Production and Labour (2)		Nancy Viviana Picón Martínez
Defend Santa Fe (1)		Roberto Mirabella
Neuquén People's Movement (1)		Osvaldo Llancafilo
Republicans United (1)		Ricardo López Murphy
We are Fueguinos (1)		Ricardo Garramuño
Transformation (1)		Lourdes Arrieta
CREO (1)		Paula Omodeo
Source: hcdn.gob.ar (last update: 5 April 2025)

== Chamber leadership ==
Title	Officeholder	Bloc	Province
President	Martín Menem	La Libertad Avanza	La Rioja
First Vice President	Cecilia Moreau	Union for the Homeland	Buenos Aires
Second Vice President	Julio Cobos	Radical Civic Union	Mendoza
Third Vice President	Vacant	—N/a	
Parliamentary Secretary	Tomás Ise Figueroa	—N/a	
Administrative Secretary	Laura Emilia Oriolo	—N/a	

== Election cycles ==
Election	Term	
Election	Start	End
2021	10 December 2021	10 December 2025
2023	10 December 2023	10 December 2027

== List of deputies ==
The table is sorted by provinces in alphabetical order, and then with their deputies in alphabetical order by their surnames. All deputies start their term on December 10, and end it on December 9 of the corresponding years, except when noted.

Province	Portrait	Deputy	Bloc	Term start	Term end
Buenos Aires		Constanza María Alonso	Union for the Homeland	2021	2025
Buenos Aires		Pablo Miguel Ansaloni	La Libertad Avanza	2023	2027
Buenos Aires		Daniel Fernando Arroyo	Union for the Homeland	2021	2025
Buenos Aires		Karina Verónica Banfi	Radical Civic Union	2023	2027
Buenos Aires		Alberto Benegas Lynch	La Libertad Avanza	2023	2027
Buenos Aires		Gabriela Besana	PRO	2021	2025
Buenos Aires		Victoria Borrego	We Do Federal Coalition	2021	2025
Buenos Aires		Santiago Andrés Cafiero	Union for the Homeland	2023	2027
Buenos Aires		María Marcela Campagnoli	We Do Federal Coalition	2021	2025
Buenos Aires		Carlos Daniel Castagneto	Union for the Homeland	2023	2027
Buenos Aires		Christian Castillo	Workers' Left Front–Unity	2023	2027
Buenos Aires		María Florencia De Sensi	PRO	2023 (Note: Since 10 December 2023. Replaced Graciela Ocaña.)	2025
Buenos Aires		Nicolás del Caño	Workers' Left Front–Unity	2021	2025
Buenos Aires		Romina del Plá	Workers' Left Front–Unity	2021	2025
Buenos Aires		José Luis Espert	La Libertad Avanza	2021	2025
Buenos Aires		Eduardo Falcone	Integration and Development Movement	2023	2027
Buenos Aires		Alejandro Finocchiaro	PRO	2021	2025
Buenos Aires		Mónica Edith Frade	We Do Federal Coalition	2023	2027
Buenos Aires		Daniel Gollán	Union for the Homeland	2021	2025
Buenos Aires		Carlos Ramiro Gutiérrez	Union for the Homeland	2023	2027
Buenos Aires		Rogelio Iparraguirre	Union for the Homeland	2021	2025
Buenos Aires		Pablo Juliano	Radical Civic Union	2023	2027
Buenos Aires		Máximo Carlos Kirchner	Union for the Homeland	2023	2027
Buenos Aires		Lilia Adela Bolukalo Lemoine	La Libertad Avanza	2023	2027
Buenos Aires		Mónica Edith Litza	Union for the Homeland	2021	2025
Buenos Aires		Hernán Lombardi	PRO	2021	2025
Buenos Aires		Juan Manuel López	We Do Federal Coalition	2021	2025
Buenos Aires		Silvia Gabriela Lospennato	PRO	2023	2027
Buenos Aires		Mónica Fernanda Macha	Union for the Homeland	2021	2025
Buenos Aires		Lorena Macyszyn	Free Buenos Aires	2023	2027
Buenos Aires		Facundo Manes	Radical Civic Union	2021	2025
Buenos Aires		Pablo Manrique	Union for the Homeland	2023	2027
Buenos Aires		Juan Marino	Union for the Homeland	2023	2027
Buenos Aires		Nicolás Massot	We Do Federal Coalition	2023	2027
Buenos Aires		Gerardo Milman	PRO	2021	2025
Buenos Aires		Matías Molle	Union for the Homeland	2023	2027
Buenos Aires		Guillermo Montenegro	La Libertad Avanza	2023	2027
Buenos Aires		Emilio Monzó	We Do Federal Coalition	2021	2025
Buenos Aires		Roxana Monzón	Union for the Homeland	2023	2027
Buenos Aires		Micaela Morán	Union for the Homeland	2022 (Note: Since 12 October 2022. Replaced Victoria Tolosa Paz.)	2025
Buenos Aires		Cecilia Moreau	Union for the Homeland	2023	2027
Buenos Aires		Leopoldo Raúl Guido Moreau	Union for the Homeland	2021	2025
Buenos Aires		Marcela Marina Pagano	La Libertad Avanza	2023	2027
Buenos Aires		Sergio Omar Palazzo	Union for the Homeland	2021	2025
Buenos Aires		Marcela Fabiana Passo	Union for the Homeland	2021	2025
Buenos Aires		Julio César Pereyra	Union for the Homeland	2021	2025
Buenos Aires		Miguel Ángel Pichetto	We Do Federal Coalition	2023	2027
Buenos Aires		Carolina Píparo	Free Buenos Aires	2021	2025
Buenos Aires		Luciana Potenza	Union for the Homeland	2023	2027
Buenos Aires		Agustina Lucrecia Propato	Union for the Homeland	2021	2025
Buenos Aires		Fabio Quetglas	Radical Civic Union	2021	2025
Buenos Aires		Aníbal Florencio Randazzo	Hacemos por Nuestro País	2021	2025
Buenos Aires		Cristian Ritondo	PRO	2023	2027
Buenos Aires		Juliana Santillán Juárez Ibrahim	La Libertad Avanza	2021	2025
Buenos Aires		Diego César Santilli	PRO	2023	2027
Buenos Aires		Santiago Javier Santurio Rodríguez	La Libertad Avanza	2023	2027
Buenos Aires		Sabrina Selva	Union for the Homeland	2023	2027
Buenos Aires		Vanesa Raquel Siley	Union for the Homeland	2021	2025
Buenos Aires		María Sotolano	PRO	2021	2025
Buenos Aires		Margarita Rosa Stolbizer	We Do Federal Coalition	2021	2025
Buenos Aires		Julia Strada	Union for the Homeland	2023	2027
Buenos Aires		Rodolfo Tailhade	Union for the Homeland	2023	2027
Buenos Aires		Danya Tavela	Radical Civic Union	2021	2025
Buenos Aires		Victoria Tolosa Paz	Union for the Homeland	2023	2027
Buenos Aires		Brenda Vargas Matyi	Union for the Homeland	2021	2025
Buenos Aires		Patricia Vázquez	PRO	2023	2027
Buenos Aires		Luana Volnovich	Union for the Homeland	2023	2027
Buenos Aires		Hugo Rubén Yasky	Union for the Homeland	2021	2025
Buenos Aires		Martín Yeza	PRO	2023	2027
Buenos Aires		Natalia Zaracho	Union for the Homeland	2023	2027
Buenos Aires City		Sabrina Ajmechet	PRO	2021	2025
Buenos Aires City		Damián Arabia	PRO	2023	2027
Buenos Aires City		María Fernanda Araujo	La Libertad Avanza	2023 (Note: Since 10 December 2023. Replaced Victoria Villarruel.)	2025
Buenos Aires City		Myriam Bregman	Workers' Left Front–Unity	2021	2025
Buenos Aires City		Ana Carla Carrizo	Radical Civic Union	2021	2025
Buenos Aires City		Mariela Coletta	Radical Civic Union	2023	2027
Buenos Aires City		Nicolás Mario Emma	La Libertad Avanza	2023 (Note: Since 10 December 2023. Replaced Javier Milei.)	2025
Buenos Aires City		Daiana Fernández Molero	PRO	2023	2027
Buenos Aires City		Maximiliano Carlos Francisco Ferraro	We Do Federal Coalition	2023	2027
Buenos Aires City		Alida Ferreyra	La Libertad Avanza	2024 (Note: Yet to take office. Will replace Diana Mondino.)	2027
Buenos Aires City		Silvana Giudici	PRO	2023	2027
Buenos Aires City		Álvaro Gustavo González	PRO	2023	2027
Buenos Aires City		Itai Hagman	Union for the Homeland	2023	2027
Buenos Aires City		Carlos Salomón Heller	Union for the Homeland	2021	2025
Buenos Aires City		Fernando Adolfo Iglesias	PRO	2021	2025
Buenos Aires City		Ricardo López Murphy	We Do Federal Coalition	2021	2025
Buenos Aires City		Gisela Marziotta	Union for the Homeland	2021	2025
Buenos Aires City		Paula Mariana Oliveto Lago	We Do Federal Coalition	2021	2025
Buenos Aires City		Paula Andrea Penacca	Union for the Homeland	2023	2027
Buenos Aires City		Lorena Pokoik	Union for the Homeland	2023	2027
Buenos Aires City		Leandro Santoro	Union for the Homeland	2021	2025
Buenos Aires City		Martín Alberto Tetaz	Radical Civic Union	2023	2027
Buenos Aires City		Eduardo Félix Valdés	Union for the Homeland	2023	2027
Buenos Aires City		María Eugenia Vidal	PRO	2021	2025
Buenos Aires City		Oscar Zago	Integration and Development Movement	2023	2027
Catamarca		Fernanda Avila	Union for the Homeland	2023	2027
Catamarca		Silvana Micaela Ginocchio	Union for the Homeland	2021	2025
Catamarca		Dante Edgardo López Rodríguez	Union for the Homeland	2021	2025
Catamarca		Francisco Monti	Radical Civic Union	2021	2025
Catamarca		Sebastián Nóblega	Union for the Homeland	2023	2027
Chaco		María Luisa Chomiak	Union for the Homeland	2021	2025
Chaco		Gerardo Cipolini	Radical Civic Union	2023	2027
Chaco		Carlos García	La Libertad Avanza	2023	2027
Chaco		Aldo Adolfo Leiva	Union for the Homeland	2023	2027
Chaco		Juan Manuel Pedrini	Union for the Homeland	2021	2025
Chaco		Juan Carlos Polini	Radical Civic Union	2021	2025
Chaco		Marilú Quiroz	PRO	2021	2025
Chubut		Eugenia Alianiello	Union for the Homeland	2021	2025
Chubut		Jorge Antonio Avila	We Do Federal Coalition	2023	2027
Chubut		José Glinski	Union for the Homeland	2023	2027
Chubut		Ana Clara Romero	PRO	2021	2025
Chubut		César Treffinger	La Libertad Avanza	2023	2027
Córdoba		Oscar Agost Carreño	We Do Federal Coalition	2023 (Note: Since 23 August 2023. Replaced Gustavo Santos.)	2025
Córdoba		Belén Avico	PRO	2023	2027
Córdoba		Héctor Walter Baldassi	PRO	2021	2025
Córdoba		Gabriel Bornoroni	La Libertad Avanza	2023	2027
Córdoba		Gabriela Brouwer de Koning	Radical Civic Union	2021	2025
Córdoba		Juan Fernando Brügge	We Do Federal Coalition	2023	2027
Córdoba		María Soledad Carrizo	Radical Civic Union	2021	2025
Córdoba		José Pablo Carro	Union for the Homeland	2021	2025
Córdoba		Natalia de la Sota	We Do Federal Coalition	2021	2025
Córdoba		Rodrigo de Loredo	Radical Civic Union	2021	2025
Córdoba		Gabriela Beatriz Estévez	Union for the Homeland	2023	2027
Córdoba		Ignacio Jorge García Aresca	We Do Federal Coalition	2021	2025
Córdoba		Carlos Mario Gutiérrez	We Do Federal Coalition	2023	2027
Córdoba		María Cecilia Ibáñez	Integration and Development Movement	2023	2027
Córdoba		Luis Albino Picat	Radical Civic Union	2023	2027
Córdoba		María Celeste Ponce	La Libertad Avanza	2023	2027
Córdoba		Laura Elena Rodríguez Machado	PRO	2021	2025
Córdoba		Alejandra Torres	We Do Federal Coalition	2023	2027
Corrientes		Manuel Ignacio Aguirre	Radical Civic Union	2021	2025
Corrientes		Lisandro Almirón	La Libertad Avanza	2023	2027
Corrientes		Sofía Brambilla	PRO	2021	2025
Corrientes		Jorge Antonio Romero	Union for the Homeland	2021	2025
Corrientes		Nancy Aracely Sand	Union for the Homeland	2023	2027
Corrientes		Alfredo Vallejos	Radical Civic Union	2023	2027
Corrientes		Cristian Alejandro Zulli	Union for the Homeland	2023	2027
Entre Ríos		Marcela Antola	Radical Civic Union	2021	2025
Entre Ríos		Atilio Benedetti	Radical Civic Union	2021	2025
Entre Ríos		Beltrán Benedit	La Libertad Avanza	2023	2027
Entre Ríos		Gustavo Bordet	Union for the Homeland	2023	2027
Entre Ríos		Ana Carolina Gaillard	Union for the Homeland	2021	2025
Entre Ríos		Pedro Jorge Galimberti	Radical Civic Union	2021	2025
Entre Ríos		Tomás Ledesma	Union for the Homeland	2021	2025
Entre Ríos		Francisco Morchio	We Do Federal Coalition	2023	2027
Entre Ríos		Blanca Inés Osuna	Union for the Homeland	2021	2025
Formosa		Gerardo Gustavo González	La Libertad Avanza	2023	2027
Formosa		Fernando Carbajal	Radical Civic Union	2021	2025
Formosa		Luis Eugenio Basterra	Union for the Homeland	2023	2027
Formosa		Gustavo Ramiro Fernández Patri	Union for the Homeland	2021	2025
Formosa		María Graciela Parola	Union for the Homeland	2023	2027
Jujuy		Leila Chaher	Union for the Homeland	2021	2025
Jujuy		Guillermo Snopek	Union for the Homeland	2023	2027
Jujuy		Manuel Quintar	La Libertad Avanza	2023	2027
Jujuy		Jorge Raúl Rizzotti	Radical Civic Union	2023	2027
Jujuy		Natalia Sarapura	Radical Civic Union	2023 (Note: Since 16 March 2023. Replaced Gustavo Bouhid.)	2025
Jujuy		Alejandro Ariel Vilca	Workers' Left Front–Unity	2021	2025
La Pampa		Martín Ardohain	PRO	2023	2027
La Pampa		Marcela Inés Coli	Radical Civic Union	2021	2025
La Pampa		Martín Maquieyra	PRO	2021	2025
La Pampa		Varinia Lis Marín	Union for the Homeland	2021	2025
La Pampa		Ariel Rauschenberger	Union for the Homeland	2023	2027
La Rioja		Hilda Clelia Aguirre de Soria	Union for the Homeland	2023	2027
La Rioja		Martín Alexis Menem	La Libertad Avanza	2023	2027
La Rioja		Sergio Guillermo Casas	Union for the Homeland	2023	2027
La Rioja		Jorge Ricardo Herrera	Union for the Homeland	2021	2025
La Rioja		Gabriela Pedrali	Union for the Homeland	2021	2025
Mendoza		Lourdes Micaela Arrieta	La Libertad Avanza	2023	2027
Mendoza		Martín Aveiro	Union for the Homeland	2023	2027
Mendoza		Adolfo Bermejo	Union for the Homeland	2021	2025
Mendoza		Julio César Cleto Cobos	Radical Civic Union	2021	2025
Mendoza		Facundo Correa Llano	La Libertad Avanza	2023	2027
Mendoza		María Mercedes Llano	La Libertad Avanza	2023	2027
Mendoza		Álvaro Fernando Martínez	The Union of Mendoza	2021	2025
Mendoza		Lisandro Nieri	Radical Civic Union	2023	2027
Mendoza		María Liliana Paponet	Union for the Homeland	2021	2025
Mendoza		Pamela Fernanda Verasay	Radical Civic Union	2021	2025
Misiones		Martín Arjol	Radical Civic Union	2021	2025
Misiones		Pedro Alberto Arrúa	Federal Innovation	2023	2027
Misiones		Ramón Emmanuel Bianchetti	PRO	2023	2027
Misiones		Carlos Alberto Fernández	Federal Innovation	2021	2025
Misiones		Florencia Naiara Klipauka Lewtak	We Do Federal Coalition	2021	2025
Misiones		Yamila Lisette Ruíz	Federal Innovation	2023	2027
Misiones		Daniel Vancsik	Federal Innovation	2023	2027
Neuquén		Tanya Yanet Bertoldi	Union for the Homeland	2021	2025
Neuquén		Pablo Cervi	Radical Civic Union	2021	2025
Neuquén		Osvaldo Llancafilo	Federal Innovation	2023 (Note: Since 10 December 2023. Replaced Rolando Figueroa.)	2025
Neuquén		Nadia Márquez	La Libertad Avanza	2023	2027
Neuquén		Pablo Toredo	Union for the Homeland	2023	2027
Río Negro		Sergio Eduardo Capozzi	PRO	2023	2027
Río Negro		Agustín Domingo	Federal Innovation	2021	2025
Río Negro		Martín Ignacio Soria	Union for the Homeland	2023	2027
Río Negro		Aníbal Tortoriello	PRO	2021	2025
Río Negro		María Lorena Villaverde	La Libertad Avanza	2023	2027
Salta		Pamela Calletti	Federal Innovation	2021	2025
Salta		Emiliano Estrada	Union for the Homeland	2021	2025
Salta		Julio Moreno Ovalle	La Libertad Avanza	2023	2027
Salta		María Emilia Orozco	La Libertad Avanza	2023	2027
Salta		Pablo Ismael Outes	Federal Innovation	2023	2027
Salta		Yolanda Graciela Vega	Federal Innovation	2023	2027
Salta		Carlos Raúl Zapata	La Libertad Avanza	2021	2025
San Juan		Walberto Enrique Allende	Union for the Homeland	2021	2025
San Juan		Ana Fabiola Aubone	Union for the Homeland	2021	2025
San Juan		Jorge Eduardo Chica Muñoz	Union for the Homeland	2023	2027
San Juan		María de los Ángeles Moreno	Production and Labour	2023 (Note: Since 10 December 2023. Replaced Susana Laciar.)	2025
San Juan		José Peluc	La Libertad Avanza	2023	2027
San Juan		Nancy Viviana Picón Martínez	Production and Labour	2023	2027
San Luis		Ernesto Nader Ali	Union for the Homeland	2023	2027
San Luis		Alberto Gustavo Arancibia Rodríguez	La Libertad Avanza	2023 (Note: Since 10 December 2023. Replaced Claudio Poggi.)	2025
San Luis		Karina Ethel Bachey	PRO	2021	2025
San Luis		Carlos D'Alessandro	La Libertad Avanza	2023	2027
San Luis		María Natalia Zabala Chacur	Union for the Homeland	2021 (Note: Since 21 December 2023. Replaced María José Zanglá.)	2025
Santa Cruz		Sergio Edgardo Acevedo	For Santa Cruz	2023 (Note: Since 10 December 2023. Replaced Claudio Vidal.)	2025
Santa Cruz		José Luis Garrido	For Santa Cruz	2023	2027
Santa Cruz		Gustavo Carlos Miguel González	Union for the Homeland	2021	2025
Santa Cruz		Ana María Ianni	Union for the Homeland	2023	2027
Santa Cruz		Roxana Nahir Claudia Reyes	Radical Civic Union	2021	2025
Santa Fe		Mario Domingo Barletta	Radical Civic Union	2021	2025
Santa Fe		Rocío Bonacci	La Libertad Avanza	2023	2027
Santa Fe		Alejandro Bongiovanni	PRO	2023	2027
Santa Fe		Florencia Carignano	Union for the Homeland	2023	2027
Santa Fe		Gabriel Felipe Chumpitaz	PRO	2021	2025
Santa Fe		Romina Diez	La Libertad Avanza	2023	2027
Santa Fe		Mónica Haydée Fein	We Do Federal Coalition	2021	2025
Santa Fe		Germana María Figueroa Casas	PRO	2021	2025
Santa Fe		Melina Giorgi	Radical Civic Union	2023 (Note: Since 10 December 2023. Replaced Victoria Tejeda.)	2025
Santa Fe		Diego Alberto Giuliano	Union for the Homeland	2023	2027
Santa Fe		Luciano Andrés Laspina	PRO	2021	2025
Santa Fe		Germán Pedro Martínez	Union for the Homeland	2023	2027
Santa Fe		Magalí Mastaler	Union for the Homeland	2021	2025
Santa Fe		Nicolás Mayoraz	La Libertad Avanza	2023	2027
Santa Fe		Roberto Mario Mirabella	Union for the Homeland	2021	2025
Santa Fe		José Carlos Núñez	PRO	2023	2027
Santa Fe		Esteban Paulón	We Do Federal Coalition	2023	2027
Santa Fe		Verónica Razzini	PRO	2023	2027
Santa Fe		Eduardo Toniolli	Union for the Homeland	2021	2025
Santiago del Estero		Celia María Campitelli	Union for the Homeland	2023	2027
Santiago del Estero		Ricardo Daniel Daives	Union for the Homeland	2023	2027
Santiago del Estero		José Edgardo Gómez	Union for the Homeland	2023	2027
Santiago del Estero		Bernardo José Herrera	Union for the Homeland	2021	2025
Santiago del Estero		María Luisa Montoto de Rogel	Union for the Homeland	2021	2025
Santiago del Estero		Nilda Moyano	Union for the Homeland	2021	2025
Santiago del Estero		Estela Mary del Rosario Neder	Union for the Homeland	2023	2027
Tierra del Fuego		Jorge Neri Araujo Hernández	Union for the Homeland	2023	2027
Tierra del Fuego		Andrea Graciela Freites	Union for the Homeland	2023	2027
Tierra del Fuego		Santiago Pauli	La Libertad Avanza	2023	2027
Tierra del Fuego		Héctor Antonio Stefani	PRO	2021	2025
Tierra del Fuego		Inés Carolina Yutrovic	Union for the Homeland	2021	2025
Tucumán		Mariano Campero	Radical Civic Union	2023	2027
Tucumán		Gerardo Huesen	La Libertad Avanza	2023	2027
Tucumán		Gladys Medina	Independencia	2023	2027
Tucumán		Elia Marina Fernández de Mansilla	Independencia	2023 (Note: Since 2 November 2023. Replaced Rossana Chahla.)	2025
Tucumán		Carlos Aníbal Cisneros	Union for the Homeland	2023	2027
Tucumán		Agustín Fernández	Independencia	2021	2025
Tucumán		Pablo Yedlin	Union for the Homeland	2023	2027
Tucumán		Paula Omodeo	CREO	2021	2025
Tucumán		Roberto Antonio Sánchez	Radical Civic Union	2021	2025
