= 2023 Chubut provincial elections =

- Gubernatorial election
- 30 July 2023
- Registered: 474 242
- Turnout: 69.34% (▼3.8pp)
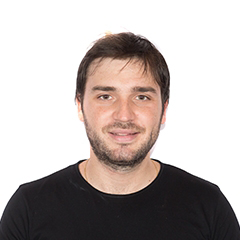

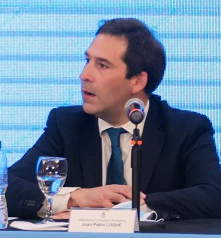

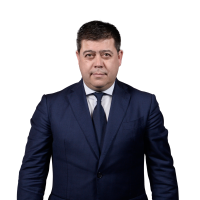
Nominee	Ignacio Agustín Torres	Juan Pablo Luque	César Treffinger
Party	PRO	PJ
Alliance	JxC	UxP	LLA
Running mate	Gustavo Menna	Ricardo Sastre	Laura Mirantes
Popular vote	117,628	111,415	43,096
Percentage	35.77%	33.88%	13.11%
Governor before election
Mariano Arcioni
FR–UxP
Elected Governor
Ignacio Torres
PRO–JxC
- Legislature
- 30 July 2023
- All 27 seats to the Legislature of Chubut
- Turnout: 69.34% (▼3.78pp)
Party	Leader	Vote %	Seats	+/–
JxC	Jacqueline Caminoa	40.23	16	+13
Arriba Chubut	Norma Arbilla	37.80	7	−1
LLA	Andrea Toro	14.25	3	New
FIT – Unidad	Santiago Vasconcelos	5.11	1	+1
This lists parties that won seats. See the complete results below.

Elections were held in the Argentine province of Chubut on 30 July 2023, to elect the Governor and Legislature of Chubut. These were part of the 2023 Argentine provincial elections. The province had abolished the simultaneous and mandatory open primaries (PASO), therefore parties held their own internal primaries to select their respective Gubernatorial candidates. In total, 5 candidates participated, and candidatures were submitted on 11 June.

== Electoral System ==
=== Governor and Vice-Governor ===
The Governor and Vice-Governor of Chubut are elected on a joint ticket through first-past-the-post (FPTP) voting.

=== Legislature ===
The Legislature of Chubut is elected every 4 years through party-list proportional representation in a single province-wide constituency with a majority bonus (16 seats reserved for the party obtaining the most votes, and 11 seats for all other parties).

== Results ==
=== Governor and Vice Governor ===
Candidate	Running mate	Party	Votes	%
Ignacio Torres	Gustavo Menna	Juntos por el Cambio	117,628	40.07
Juan Pablo Luque	Ricardo Sastre	Arriba Chubut	111,415	37.95
César Hernán Treffinger	Laura Haydee Mirantes	Por la Libertad Independiente Chubutense	43,096	14.68
Emilse Elizabeth Saavedra	María Julieta Rusconi	Workers' Left Front – Unity	14,009	4.77
Oscar Carlos Petersen	Nancy Beatriz Lobos	GEN Party	7,401	2.52
Total			293,549	100.00
Valid votes			293,549	89.26
Invalid votes			7,894	2.40
Blank votes			27,409	8.33
Total votes			328,852	100.00
Registered voters/turnout			474,242	69.34
Source: Elecciones Chubut

=== Legislature ===
Party	Votes	%	+/–	Seats	+/–
Juntos por el Cambio	114,316	40.23	+24.34	16	+13
Arriba Chubut	107,394	37.80	+4.30	7	−1
Por la Libertad Independiente Chubutense	40,500	14.25	new	3	new
Workers' Left Front – Unity	14,511	5.11	+0.42	1	+1
GEN Party	7,424	2.61	new	0	0
Total	284,145	100.00	–	27	0
Valid votes	284,145	86.41			
Invalid votes	7,577	2.30			
Blank votes	37,128	11.29			
Total votes	328,850	100.00			
Registered voters/turnout	474,242	69.34			
Source: Elecciones Chubut
