= Gustavo Menna =

Argentine politician

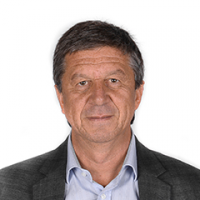

Vice Governor of Chubut
- Incumbent
- Assumed office 10 December 2023
- Governor: Ignacio Torres
- Preceded by: Ricardo Sastre

National Deputy
- In office 10 December 2017 – 10 December 2021
- Constituency: Chubut

Provincial Deputy of Chubut
- In office 10 December 1995 – 10 December 1999

Personal details
- Born: Alberto Gustavo Menna; 1 November 1965 (age 60) Coronel Pringles, Argentina
- Party: Radical Civic Union
- Education: University of Buenos Aires

Alberto Gustavo Menna (born 1 November 1965) is an Argentine politician. A member of the Radical Civic Union (UCR), Menna has served as Vice Governor of Chubut Province since 2023, serving under Governor Ignacio Torres. He has also served in different positions in local government and as a National Deputy for Chubut from 2017 to 2021.

== Early life and career ==
Gustavo Menna was born in Coronel Pringles, Buenos Aires Province. He studied law at the University of Buenos Aires, graduating in 1990. Relocating to Rawson, Chubut, he began his public service as Undersecretary of Government and Justice (1991–1993) under Governor Carlos Maestro. Later, in Comodoro Rivadavia, he served as Secretary of Government and Cabinet Coordination (1999–2003).

== Career as legislator ==
From 1995 to 1999 he was a member of the Legislature of Chubut.

In the 2017 legislative elections, Menna led the Cambiemos alliance (comprising the Unión Cívica Radical and PRO) as its head candidate for National Deputy. The list received 31.16% of votes, finishing second behind the ruling provincial party Chubut Somos Todos (33.23%) led by Governor Mariano Arcioni. Menna was elected, becoming the first UCR representative from Chubut to hold a seat in the Chamber of Deputies in a decade.

Two years later, he ran for governor of Chubut as the Cambiemos candidate in the 2019 provincial elections. His campaign was significantly impacted by Argentina's economic downturn during the final months of President Mauricio Macri's administration. Menna placed third in both the primary (14.48%) and general elections (15.48%), behind incumbent Arcioni and the Frente de Todos candidate Carlos Linares.

On 30 July 2023, Menna was elected vice governor of Chubut as the running mate of Ignacio Torres, of the PRO party, in the provincial election.

== Electoral history ==
=== Executive ===
Electoral history of Gustavo Menna
Election	Office	List	Votes			Result	Ref.
Election	Office	List	Total	%	P.	Result	Ref.
2019	Governor of Chubut	Change Chubut	45,495	15.48%	3rd	Not elected	
2023	Vice Governor of Chubut	Together for Change	117,628	35.77%	1st	Elected	

=== Legislative ===
Electoral history of Gustavo Menna
Election	Office	List	#	District	Votes			Result	Ref.
Election	Office	List	#	District	Total	%	P.	Result	Ref.
1995	Provincial Deputy	Radical Civic Union		Chubut	78.742	43.95%	1st (Note: Presented on an electoral list. The data shown represents the share of the vote the entire party/alliance received in that constituency.)	Elected	
2007	National Deputy	Radical Civic Union	1	Chubut	28,283	12.75%	3rd	Not elected	
2017	National Deputy	Let's Change Chubut	1	Chubut	95,266	31.16%	2nd	Elected	
2021	National Deputy	Together for Change Chubut	2	Chubut	110,649	37.97%	1st	Not elected	

Political offices
Preceded by Ricardo Sastre	Vice Governor of Chubut; 2023–present	Incumbent
