= 2023 Argentine provincial elections =

Provincial elections in Argentina

The Argentine provincial elections will elect the executive and legislative authorities of the Autonomous City of Buenos Aires and in 21 of the 23 provinces of Argentina, except (executive) Corrientes and Santiago del Estero; elections in Tucumán (for a month) and San Juan (executive, for 1 and half months) were suspended by the Supreme Court.

== Gubernatorial races summary ==
Province	Incumbent		Candidates
Province	Governor	List	Candidates
Buenos Aires	Axel Kicillof	Union for the Homeland	▌ ✓ Axel Kicillof (UP); ▌ Néstor Grindetti (JxC); ▌ Carolina Píparo (LLA); ▌ Rubén Sobrero (FIT-U)
Buenos Aires City	Horacio Rodríguez Larreta	Juntos por el Cambio	▌ ✓ Jorge Macri (JxC); ▌ Leandro Santoro (UP); ▌ Ramiro Marra (LLA); ▌ Vanina Biasi (FIT-U)
Catamarca	Raúl Jalil	Union for the Homeland	▌ ✓ Raúl Jalil (UP); ▌ José Jalil Colomé (LLA); ▌ Flavio Fama (JxC)
Chaco	Jorge Capitanich	Union for the Homeland	▌ ✓ Leandro Zdero (JxC); ▌ Jorge Capitanich (FC); ▌ Gustavo Martín Martínez (CER); ▌ Alfredo Rodríguez (LLA); ▌ Juan Carlos Bacileff Ivanoff (FI)
Chubut	Mariano Arcioni	We Are All Chubut	▌ ✓ Ignacio Torres (JxC); ▌ Juan Pablo Luque (ACh); ▌ César Treffinger (LLA); ▌ Emilse Saavedra (FIT-U)
Córdoba	Juan Schiaretti	We Do for Córdoba	▌ ✓ Martín Llaryora (HPC); ▌ Luis Juez (JxC); ▌ Aurelio García Elorrio (EVC); ▌ Agustín Spaccesi (PL); ▌ Liliana Olivero (FIT-U); ▌ Federico Alessandri (CDT)
Entre Ríos	Gustavo Bordet	Union for the Homeland	▌ ✓ Rogelio Frigerio (JxER); ▌ Adán Bahl (MpER); ▌ Sebastián Etchevehere (LLA)
Formosa	Gildo Insfrán	Union for the Homeland	▌ ✓ Gildo Insfrán (FDV); ▌ Fernando Carbajal (FAF); ▌ Francisco Paoltroni (LTP)
Jujuy	Gerardo Morales		▌ ✓ Carlos Sadir (FCJ); ▌ Rubén Rivarola (FJ); ▌ Alejandro Vilca (FIT-U); ▌ Juan Miguel Cardozo Traillou (UpJ); ▌ Cecilia García Casasco (VIA+PL); ▌ Rodolfo Tecchi (JTF)
La Pampa	Sergio Ziliotto	Union for the Homeland	▌ ✓ Sergio Ziliotto (FJP); ▌ Martín Berhongaray (JxC); ▌ Juan Carlos Tierno (CO); ▌ Luciano González (FIT-U)
La Rioja	Ricardo Quintela	Union for the Homeland	▌ ✓ Ricardo Quintela (FDT); ▌ Felipe Álvarez (JxC); ▌ Martín Menem (LLA); ▌ Carolina Goycochea (FIT-U)
Mendoza	Rodolfo Suárez		▌ ✓ Alfredo Cornejo (CM); ▌ Omar De Marchi (LUM); ▌ Omar Parisi (EM); ▌ Mario Vadillo (PV); ▌ Lautaro Jiménez (FIT-U)
Misiones	Oscar Herrera Ahuad		▌ ✓ Hugo Passalacqua (FRC); ▌ Martín Arjol (JxC); ▌ Pablo Isaac Lenguaza (LFDT); ▌ Julia Perié (FA)
Neuquén	Omar Gutiérrez	Neuquén People's Movement	▌ ✓ Rolando Figueroa (Neu.); ▌ Marcos Koopmann (MPN); ▌ Ramón Rioseco (FDT); ▌ Carlos Eguía (C.); ▌ Pablo Cervi (JxC); ▌ Patricia Jure (FIT-U)
Río Negro	Arabela Carreras	Together We Are Río Negro	▌ ✓ Alberto Weretilneck (JSRN); ▌ Aníbal Tortoriello (JxC); ▌ Silvia Horne (VCT); ▌ Ariel Rivero (1RN)
Salta	Gustavo Sáenz	Salta Identity Party	▌ ✓ Gustavo Sáenz (AGG); ▌ Miguel Nanni (JxC); ▌ Emiliano Estrada (Av.); ▌ Walter Wayar (ET); ▌ Verónica Caliva (SPT)
San Juan	Sergio Uñac	Union for the Homeland	▌ ✓ Marcelo Orrego (UpSJ); ▌ José Luis Gioja (SJpT); ▌ José Rubén Uñac (SJpT)
San Luis	Alberto Rodríguez Saá	Union for the Homeland	▌ ✓ Claudio Poggi (CSL); ▌ Jorge "Gato" Fernández (UpSL)
Santa Cruz	Alicia Kirchner	Union for the Homeland	▌ ✓ Claudio Vidal (PSC); ▌ Pablo Grasso (UP); ▌ Javier Belloni (UP); ▌ Patricia Reyes (CSC)
Tierra del Fuego	Gustavo Melella	Union for the Homeland	▌ ✓ Gustavo Melella (UHF); ▌ Héctor Stefani (PRO); ▌ Andrea Almirón De Pauli (RU); ▌ Pablo Daniel Blanco (JxC); ▌ Lucía Zulma Fernández (FIT-U)
Tucumán	Osvaldo Jaldo	Union for the Homeland	▌ ✓ Osvaldo Jaldo (FDTpT); ▌ Roberto Antonio Sánchez (JxC); ▌ Ricardo Bussi (FR); ▌ Federico Masso (LDS)

== Elections ==
=== 16 April ===
- Neuquén, Rolando Figueroa defeated the gubernatorial candidate of the long-governing Neuquén People's Movement, for the first time in 60 years, with 36.94% of Comunidad.
- Río Negro, Alberto Weretilneck wins with 42.43%. Third consecutive electoral victory of Together We Are Río Negro.

=== 5 May ===
- Jujuy, Carlos Sadir won with 49.59%. Third consecutive electoral victory for Together for Change.
- La Rioja, Ricardo Quintela is re-elected with 50.63%. Fourth consecutive electoral victory of Union for the Homeland and its predecessor parties.
- Misiones, Hugo Passalacqua won with 64.18%. Sixth consecutive electoral victory of the Front for the Renewal of Concord, it has not lost since its foundation.

=== 14 May ===
- La Pampa, Sergio Ziliotto Is re-elected with 47.66%. Twelfth electoral victory of the Justicialist Party.
- Salta, Gustavo Sáenz is re-elected with 47.51% for the Salta Identity Party.
- San Juan (gubernatorial election suspended), the legislative election was won by the Union for the Homeland with 53.25%, obtained 9 of 17 legislators, Together for Change obtained 7 and Liberty Advances obtained 1.
- Tierra del Fuego, Gustavo Melella is re-elected with 65.63%. Fourth consecutive electoral victory of Union for the Homeland (counting predecessors) and allies.
- Tucumán (suspended)

=== 11 June ===
- Corrientes, Legislative election. Victory of ECO+Vamos Corrientes with 68.06%, obtaining 11 legislators out of 15 and 4 senators out of 5.
- San Luis, Claudio Poggi obtained 53.10% and won by the total sum of Together for Change with 53.31%. Defeat of the supremacy of the Saá brothers (Adolfo 1983-2001 and Alberto 2003-2011 and 2015-2023).
- Tucumán, Osvaldo Jaldo won with 57.96%. Seventh consecutive electoral victory of Union for the Homeland (counting its predecessors).

=== 25 June ===
- Córdoba, Martin Llaryora won with 45.20%. Seventh consecutive electoral victory of We Do for Córdoba (counting its predecessor Union for Córdoba).
- Formosa, Gildo Insfrán is re-elected for the eighth consecutive time with 69.97%.

=== 2 July ===
- San Juan, Marcelo Orrego defeated the gubernatorial candidate of the governing Union for the Homeland, for the first time in 20 years, with 49.81%.

=== 30 July ===
- Chubut, Ignacio Torres defeats the candidate of Union for the Homeland. He won 35.71% to 34.11% and put an end to 20 years of Peronism (PJ-CST)

=== 13 August ===
- Santa Cruz, Claudio Vidal defeated the gubernatorial candidates of the governing Union for the Homeland, for the first time in 40 years, with 46.5%.

=== 10 September ===
- Santa Fe, Maximiliano Pullaro of Together for Change defeats the Union for the Homeland candidate with 58.40%. He became the first candidate to exceed one million votes in Santa Fe.

=== 17 September ===
- Chaco, Leandro Zdero beats Jorge Capitanich with 46%. The UCR wins the province again, it has not happened since 2003.

=== 24 September ===
- Mendoza, Alfredo Cornejo of Radical Civic Union defeated the Liberty Advances candidate, Omar de Marchi, with 39.50% of the vote. He previously held the position from 2015 to 2019.

=== 22 October ===
- Buenos Aires, Axel Kicillof of Union for the Homeland won re-election with 44.9% of the vote.
- Buenos Aires City, Jorge Macri of Together for Change won against Union for the Homeland candidate, Leandro Santoro, with 49.6% of the vote. Despite provincial electoral rules requiring a runoff if a candidate does not win 50% of the vote, it was not held since Santaro dropped out.
- Catamarca, Raúl Jalil of Union for the Homeland won re-election with 53.73% of the vote.
- Entre Ríos, Rogelio Frigerio of Together for Change won against the Union for the Homeland candidate, Adrián Bahl with 41.7% of the vote. The UP-PJ have governed the province since 2003.

== See also ==
- Elections in Argentina
- 2023 Argentine general election
