= Lorena Pokoik =

Argentine politician

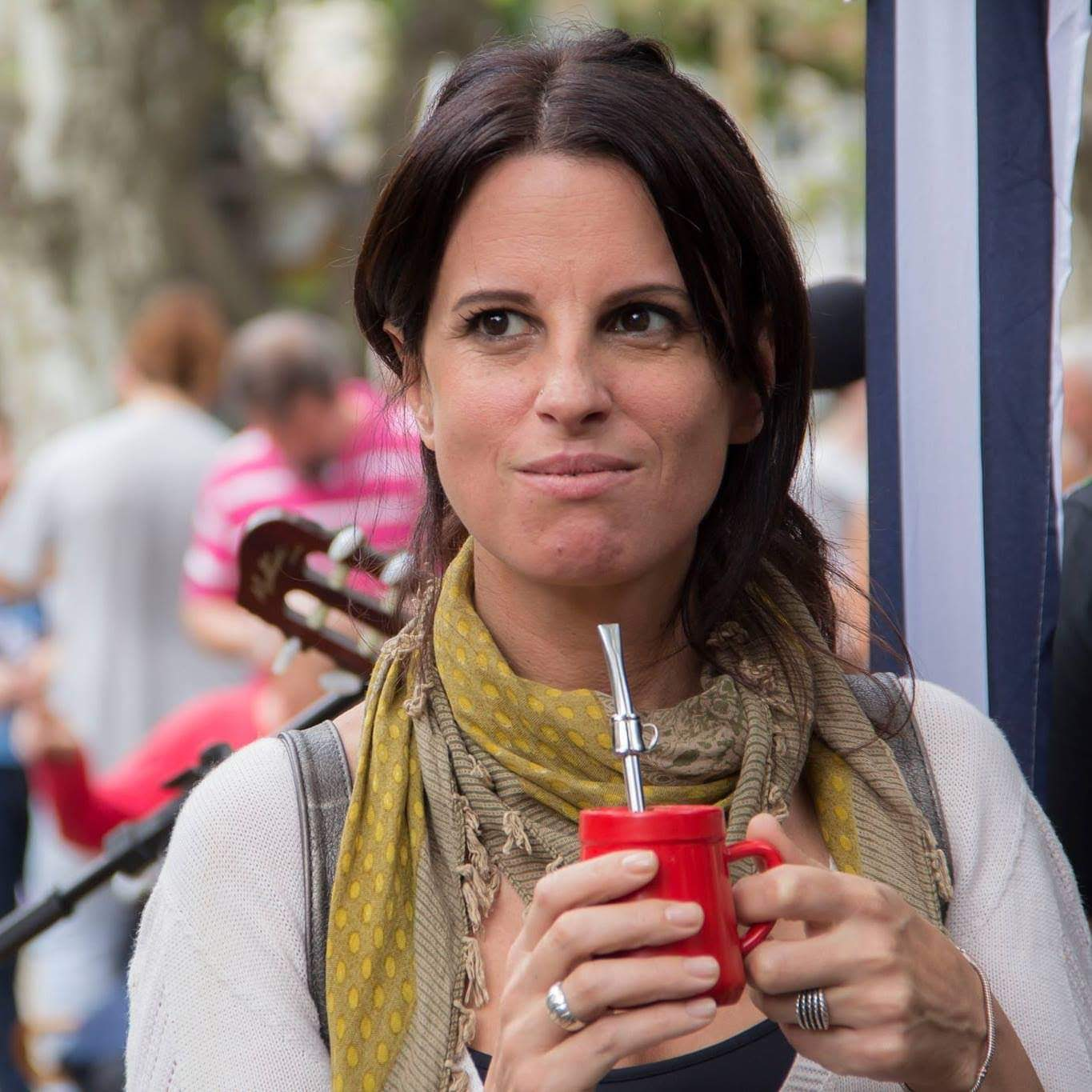

National Deputy
- Incumbent
- Assumed office 10 December 2023
- Constituency: City of Buenos Aires

Legislator of the City of Buenos Aires
- In office 12 December 2013 – 10 December 2021

Personal details
- Born: 24 December 1972 (age 53) Buenos Aires, Argentina
- Party: Justicialist Party
- Other political affiliations: Front for Victory (2003–2017); Unidad Porteña (2017–2019); Frente de Todos (2019–2023); Union for the Homeland (2023–present)
- Education: National University of Tres de Febrero

Lorena Iris Pokoik García (Note: In this Spanish name, the first or paternal surname is Pokoik and the second or maternal family name is García.) (born 24 December 1972) is an Argentine politician, who is currently a member of the Argentine Chamber of Deputies elected in the Autonomous City of Buenos Aires in 2023. A member of the Justicialist Party, Pokoik previously served as a member of the Buenos Aires City Legislature from 2013 to 2021.

== Early life and education ==
Pokoik was born and raised in the Mataderos neighbourhood of Buenos Aires. She became active in politics during her first year of secondary school, when she took part in the student union at Liceo No. 8. Her family later moved to Boedo, another neighbourhood of Buenos Aires City, and she continued her studies at notable school Colegio Nacional Mariano Moreno.

As a teenager she was also involved in local political activities through a Justicialist Party branch in the Abasto area. Pokoik earned a licenciatura in public policy and a diploma in regional integration policy.

== Political career ==
Pokoik was first elected to the Buenos Aires City Legislature in the 2013 legislative election as the 5th candidate in the Front for Victory list. Pokoik was re-elected in 2017, this time as the sixth candidate in the Front for Victory list.

As of 2017 she was vice president of the Buenos Aires chapter of the Justicialist Party.

=== National Deputy ===
Pokoik was the third candidate in the Buenos Aires City Union for the Homeland list to the Argentine Chamber of Deputies in the 2023 general election, behind Paula Penacca and Eduardo Valdés; the list received 31.41% of the popular vote, and Pokoik was elected. She took office on 10 December 2023.

On 2 July 2025, Pokoik entered an argument during a debate in Congress when she accused another deputy, Sabrina Ajmechet, of "defending genocide" for her pro-Israel statements. Other deputies then accused Pokoik of being an anti-semite, to which Pokoik retorted by saying she is of Jewish descent and her family survived the Holocaust.

== Electoral history ==
Electoral history of Paula Penacca
Election	Office	List	#	District	Votes			Result	Ref.
Election	Office	List	#	District	Total	%	P.	Result	Ref.
2013	City Legislator	Front for Victory	5	City of Buenos Aires	321,863	17.18%	3rd (Note: Presented on an electoral list. The data shown represents the share of the vote the entire party/alliance received in that constituency.)	Elected	
2017	City Legislator	Front for Victory	6	City of Buenos Aires	408,462	21.26%	2nd	Elected	
2023	National Deputy	Union for the Homeland	3	City of Buenos Aires	577,225	31.41%	2nd	Elected	
