= Juan Mario Pais =

Argentine politician

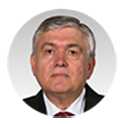

National Senator
- In office 10 December 2015 – 10 December 2021
- Constituency: Chubut

Councillor of Magistracy
- In office 2 July 2019 – 27 December 2019
- Appointed by: Senate
- In office 17 August 2017 – 18 November 2018
- Appointed by: Senate

National Deputy
- In office 10 December 2007 – 10 December 2015
- Constituency: Chubut

Provincial Legislator of Chubut
- In office 10 December 1991 – 10 December 1999

Personal details
- Born: 7 November 1955 (age 70) Mendoza, Argentina
- Party: Justicialist Party
- Other political affiliations: Front for Victory (2003–2017); Frente de Todos (since 2019)
- Education: University of Mendoza

Juan Mario Pais (born 7 November 1955) is an Argentine politician, who was a National Senator for Chubut from 2015 to 2021 and a National Deputy from 2007 to 2015. He belongs to the Justicialist Party.

== Early and personal life ==
Pais was born on 7 November 1955 in Mendoza. He studied law at the University of Mendoza, graduating in 1977. He is married to Susana Cervatto and has four children.

== Political career ==
In 1988, he was appointed undersecretary of government and justice of the provincial government of Chubut in the administration of Governor Néstor Perl. In 1991, he was elected to the provincial legislature, and was re-elected in 1995. From 1992 to 1995, he was the first vice president of the legislature, and from 1995 to 1999, he was the second vice president of the legislature.

From 2001 to 2002, he was the chief attorney of the Banco del Chubut, the province's state-owned bank. Up until 2007, he was a legislative aide to Marcelo Guinle, a Justicialist Party senator for Chubut. Pais had worked for Guinle during the latter's time as a member of the 1994 constituent convention.

In the 2007 legislative election, Pais was the first candidate in the Front for Victory list to National Chamber of Deputies. The FPV list received 53.28% of the vote, and Pais was comfortably elected alongside the other two candidates in the lost: Rosa Chiquichano and Manuel Amor Morejón. Pais was re-elected in 2011 with 60.68% of the vote as the third candidate in the FPV list.

From 1993 to 1995, he was president of the Comodoro Rivadavia chapter of the Justicialist Party, and later presided the Chubut Justicialist Party from 1996 to 2000. From 2005 to 2016 he was the official attorney of the Chubut PJ, and served as a member of the PJ national congress.

=== National Senator ===
In the 2015 general election, Pais was the first candidate in the FPV list to the National Senate, followed by Nancy González. With 42.51% of the vote, the FPV was the most voted alliance in the province, and both Pais and González were elected for the majority as per the limited voting system used for the Argentine upper house. González was sworn in as senator on 3 December 2015. Pais originally formed part of the Front for Victory bloc, but joined most other FPV senators in breaking away and forming the Argentina Federal bloc following the 2017 legislative election. Following the 2019 general election, Pais formed part of the Frente de Todos bloc alongside most other peronist senators; this meant all three senators from Chubut for the 2015–2021 term (Pais, González, and Luenzo) all formed part of the same bloc.

As senator, Pais formed part of the parliamentary commissions on Labour and Union Affairs, Fuels and Energy, Ecology, General Legislation, and Freedom of Expression. He was a vocal supporter of the legalisation of abortion in Argentina, voting in favour the two Voluntary Interruption of Pregnancy bill debated by the Argentine Congress in 2018 and 2020.

He formed part of the Council of Magistracy of the Nation as one of the Senate's three representatives from 17 August 2017 – replacing Ruperto Godoy – to December 2018, and later from 2 July 2019 to 27 December 2019 – replacing Miguel Ángel Pichetto.

Pais did not stand for re-election in 2021, and his term expired on 10 December 2021.
