= Alfredo Luenzo =

Argentine politician

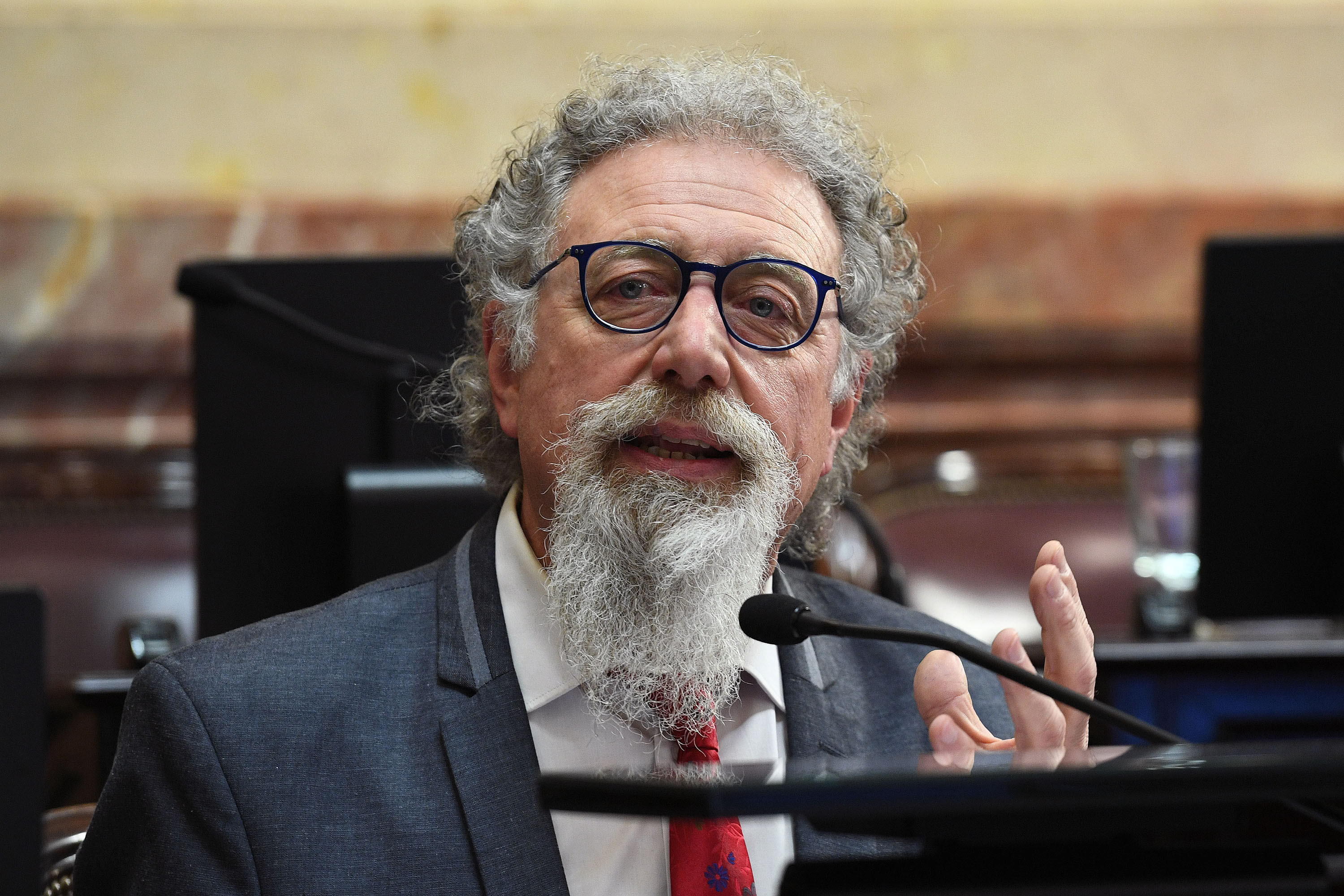

National Senator
- In office 10 December 2015 – 10 December 2021
- Constituency: Chubut

Personal details
- Born: 16 October 1957 (age 68) Azul, Argentina
- Party: We Are All Chubut
- Other political affiliations: Renewal Front (since 2015); Frente de Todos (since 2019)
- Education: Escuela de Psicología Social Pichon Riviere

Alfredo Héctor González Luenzo (born 16 October 1957) is an Argentine psychologist, journalist and politician, who was a National Senator for Chubut from 2015 to 2021. Luenzo belongs to the regionalist alliance We Are All Chubut, and sat with the Frente de Todos parliamentary bloc in the Senate from 2019 to 2021.

== Early life and career ==
Luenzo was born on 16 October 1957 in Azul, Buenos Aires, but moved to Comodoro Rivadavia, Chubut early on in life. He studied to be a music professor at Instituto María Luisa Anido, graduating in 1975, and has a social psychology degree from Escuela de Psicología Social Pichon-Rivière, attained in 1991.

He worked as content director at C5N, and as a journalist at Comodoro Rivadavia's Canal 9 and Radio del Mar. Luenzo has three children.

== Political career ==
In the 2015 general election, Luenzo was selected to be We Are All Chubut's first candidate to the National Senate by the alliance's leader and Chubut governor Mario Das Neves. The ChuSoTo list received 34.96% of the vote, coming second behind the Front for Victory list and earning the minority seat as per the limited voting system used for the Argentine upper house. Luenzo was sworn in on 3 December 2015.

While he originally remained in a single-member bloc, following the 2017 legislative election Luenzo joined the Argentina Federal bloc led by Miguel Ángel Pichetto. Following the 2019 general election, most sectors of the peronist movement unified into the Frente de Todos, of which Luenzo formed part: this meant all three senators from Chubut for the 2015–2021 term (Luenzo, González, and Pais) all formed part of the same bloc.

As senator, Luenzo formed part of the parliamentary commissions on Population and Human Development, Health, Foreign Affairs and Worship, Education and Culture, and Environment. He was a supporter of the legalization of abortion in Argentina, voting in favour the two Voluntary Interruption of Pregnancy bill debated by the Argentine Congress in 2018 and 2020.

Luenzo did not stand for re-election in 2021, and his term expired on 10 December 2021.
