= Rawson Department =

Rawson Department may refer to:

- Rawson Department, Chubut
- Rawson Department, San Juan
