= Ignacio Torres =

Ignacio Torres may refer to:

- Ignacio Torres (footballer) (born 1983), Mexican footballer
- Ignacio Torres (politician) (born 1988), Argentine politician
