= Héctor Solís Flores =

Mexican businessman

Hector Solis Flores (born September 2, 1985) is a Mexican entrepreneur and local celebrity.

== Early years ==
Solis was born in Mexico City to Hector Solis and Milagro Flores. He moved from Mexico City to Guadalajara at the age of two. He studied at the Franco Mexicano where he learned French. This opened the doors to the world of celebrities and fashion. Thanks to his French, he studied in the ESCP where he met Zinedine Zidane who introduced him to the sports environment. He is now a partner of Gerardo Arturo González Sü.
