= Julio Etchegoyen =

Argentine military officer and politician

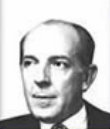

Governor of La Pampa Province
- In office November 10, 1978 – April 8, 1981
- Preceded by: Carlos Enrique Aguirre
- Succeeded by: Ricardo Telleriarte

Governor of Chubut Province
- In office April 24, 1976 – November 7, 1978
- Preceded by: Rafael Benjamín De Piano
- Succeeded by: Alberto Raúl Rueda

Personal details
- Born: 1926
- Died: March 23, 2017 (aged 90-91)

Julio César Etchegoyen (1926 – March 23, 2017) was an Argentine military officer and politician. He was the de facto military Governor of Chubut Province from 1976 to 1978 and Governor of La Pampa Province from 1978 until 1981 during the National Reorganization Process dictatorship.

Etchegoyen died on March 23, 2017, at the age of 83.
