= Puerto Rawson =

Coordinates: 43°20′S 65°03′W

Puerto Rawson Porth Rawson
- Municipality and village
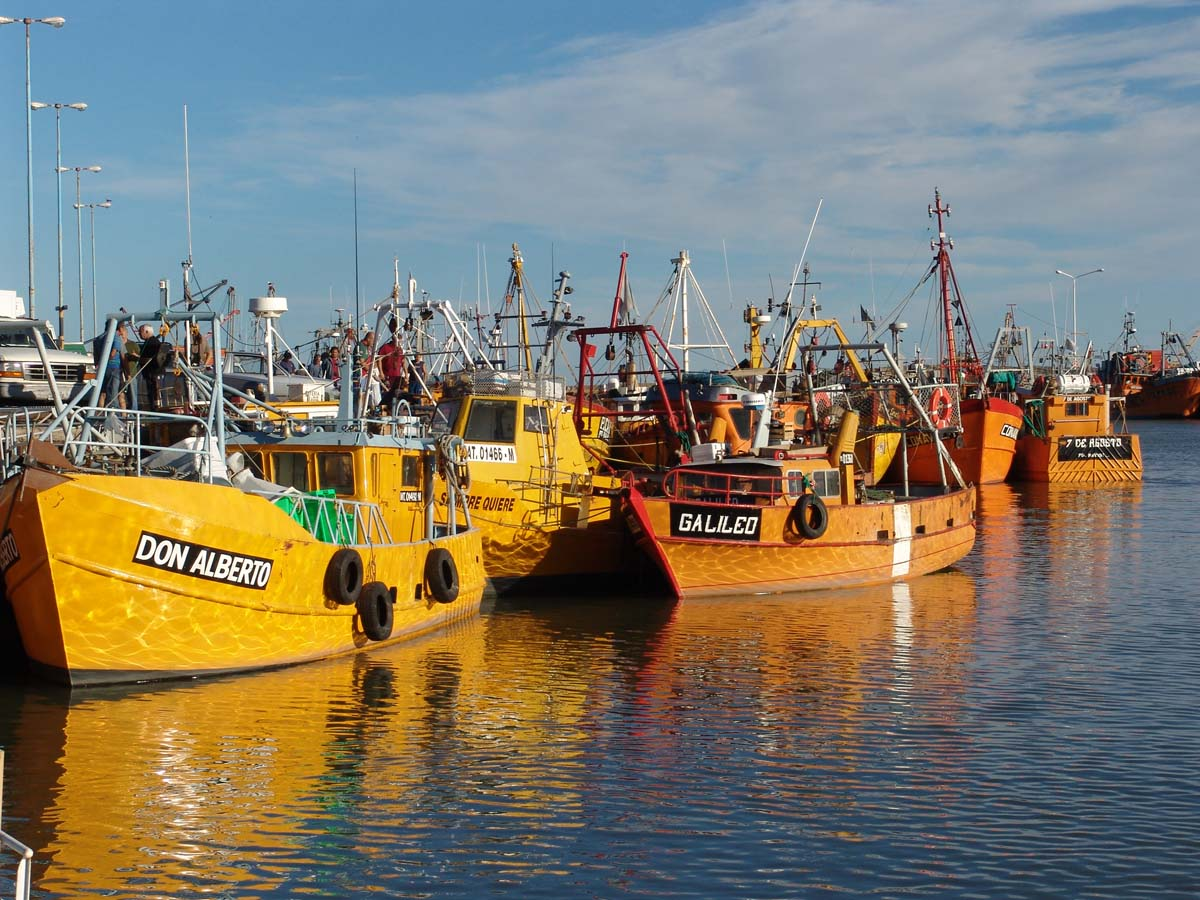
- Fishing trawlers in Puerto Rawson
- Interactive map of Puerto Rawson
- Country: Argentina
- Province: Chubut Province
- Department: Rawson Department, Chubut
- Time zone: UTC−3 (ART)

Puerto Rawson is a fishing port, village and municipality in Chubut Province in southern Argentina. It is located at the mouth of the Chubut River, about 5 km from the city of Rawson.
