= José Eugenio Tello =

Argentine politician (1849–1924)

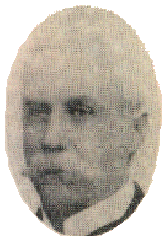
- Portrait of Gobernador-Tello.gif

Governor of Jujuy
- In office April 18, 1883 – May 1, 1885
- Preceded by: Pablo Blas
- Succeeded by: José María Álvarez Prado

2nd Governor of Chubut
- In office 1885–1898
- Preceded by: Luis Jorge Fontana
- Succeeded by: Carlos O'Donell

Governor of Río Negro
- In office 1898–1905
- Preceded by: Isaías Crespo
- Succeeded by: Félix O. Cordero

Personal details
- Born: November 14, 1849 San Salvador de Jujuy, Argentina
- Died: November 30, 1924 (aged 75) Buenos Aires, Argentina

José Eugenio Tello (November 14, 1849 – November 30, 1924) was an Argentine politician that governed the provinces of Jujuy, Chubut, and Río Negro.

Tello was born in San Salvador de Jujuy, Argentina. He was the son of José Tello, a Spanish businessman born in Zamora, and Josefa Zalazar, an Argentine woman.

He represented a variety of districts in the Jujuy legislature between 1875 and 1883: Ledesma Department from 1875 to 1876, Humahuaca from 1877 to 1878 and again in 1880, and San Pedro de Jujuy in 1879 and again from 1881 to 1883. He ultimately became president of the legislature, and then was elected governor of the province. From 1886 to 1895, he served as a senator for Jujuy in the national legislature. Then, from 1895 to 1898, he served as governor of Chubut (then a national territory). In 1897, he went to the Genoa Valley to put down a rebellion commanded by the cacique Salpul. A year later, he left Chubut territory and became governor of Río Negro territory, a post he held until 1905.

He died in 1924 in Buenos Aires, where he lived the last years of his life.
