= Rubén Ferrer =

Argentine footballer (born 1975)

Personal information
- Full name: Rubén Darío Ferrer
- Date of birth: 31 January 1975 (age 51)
- Place of birth: Rawson, Chubut, Argentina
- Height: 1.79 m (5 ft 10 in)
- Position: Striker

Senior career*
Years	Team	Apps	(Gls)
1992–1996	Defensores de La Ribera	63	(64)
1997–1999	Gimnasia LP	7	(1)
1999–2001	Los Andes	51	(18)
2001	Marítimo	9	(3)
2002	Deportes Temuco	19	(7)
2003–2004	Técnico Universitario	59	(33)
2004	Emelec	4	(0)
2005	San Martín SJ	16	(6)
2005–2006	Defensa y Justicia	36	(19)
2006–2007	Aldosivi	32	(16)
2007–2008	Unión Santa Fe	15	(0)
2008–2010	Almirante Brown	70	(27)
2010–2011	Nueva Chicago	31	(7)
2011–2012	Deportivo Madryn	21	(5)
- * Club domestic league appearances and goals

Rubén Darío Ferrer (born 31 January 1975 in Rawson, Chubut) is an Argentine former football striker.

== Teams ==
- (Argentina) Defensores de La Ribera 1992–1996
- (Argentina) Gimnasia La Plata 1997–1999
- (Argentina) Los Andes 1999–2001
- (Portugal) Marítimo 2001
- (Chile) Deportes Temuco 2002
- (Ecuador) Técnico Universitario 2003–2004
- (Ecuador) Emelec 2004
- (Argentina) San Martín de San Juan 2005
- (Argentina) Defensa y Justicia 2005–2006
- (Argentina) Aldosivi 2006–2007
- (Argentina) Unión de Santa Fe 2007–2008
- (Argentina) Almirante Brown 2008–2010
- (Argentina) Nueva Chicago 2010–2011
- (Argentina) Deportivo Madryn 2011–2012
