= Playa Magagna =

Coordinates: 43°22′56″S 65°02′42″W

- Municipality and village
- Interactive map of Playa Magagna
- Country: Argentina
- Province: Chubut Province
- Department: Rawson Department, Chubut
- Time zone: UTC−3 (ART)

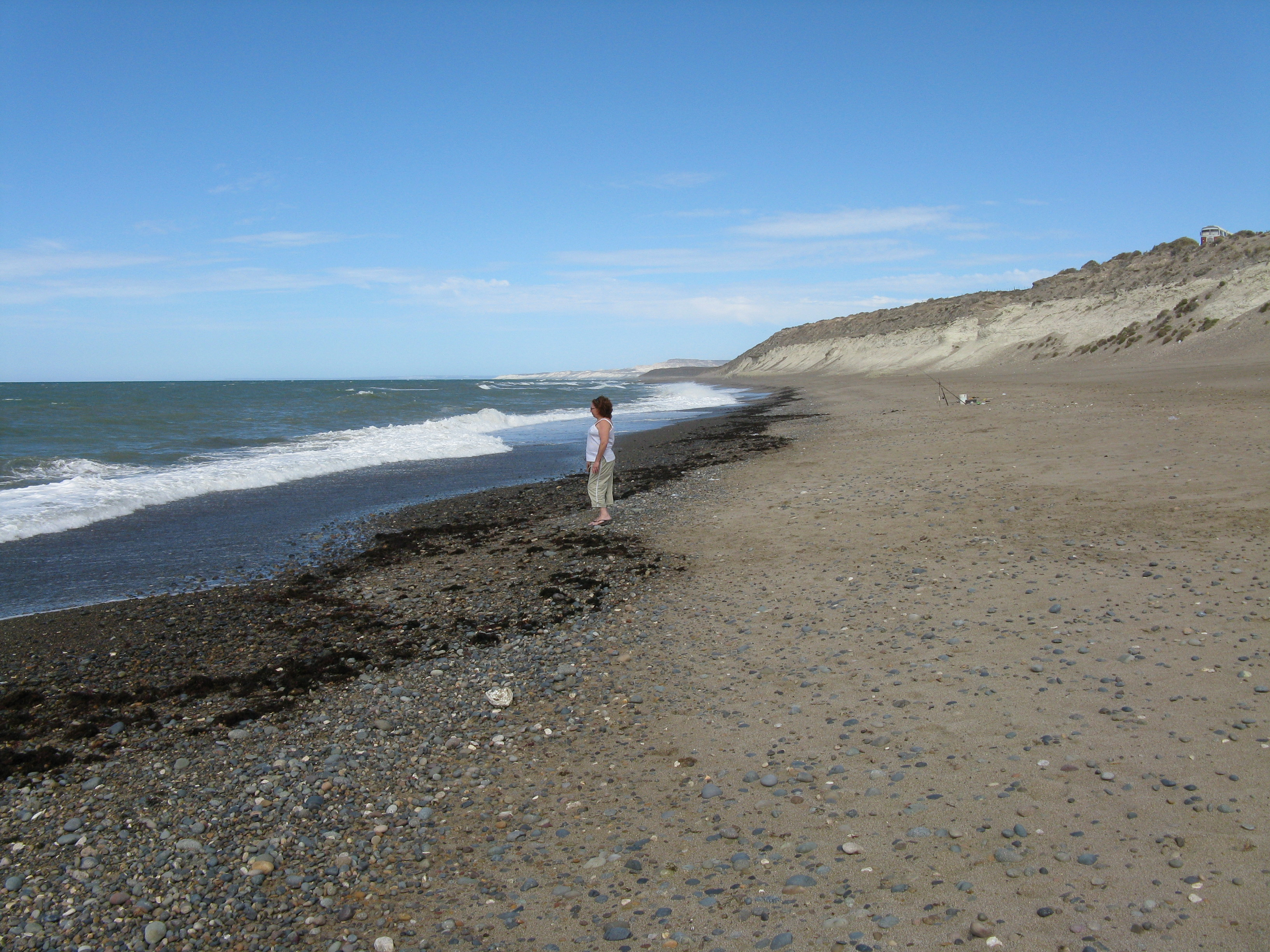
Playa Magagna-(March

Playa Magagna is a village and municipality in Chubut Province in southern Argentina.
