= Luis Jorge Fontana =

Argentine military officer, explorer, geographer, writer, and politician

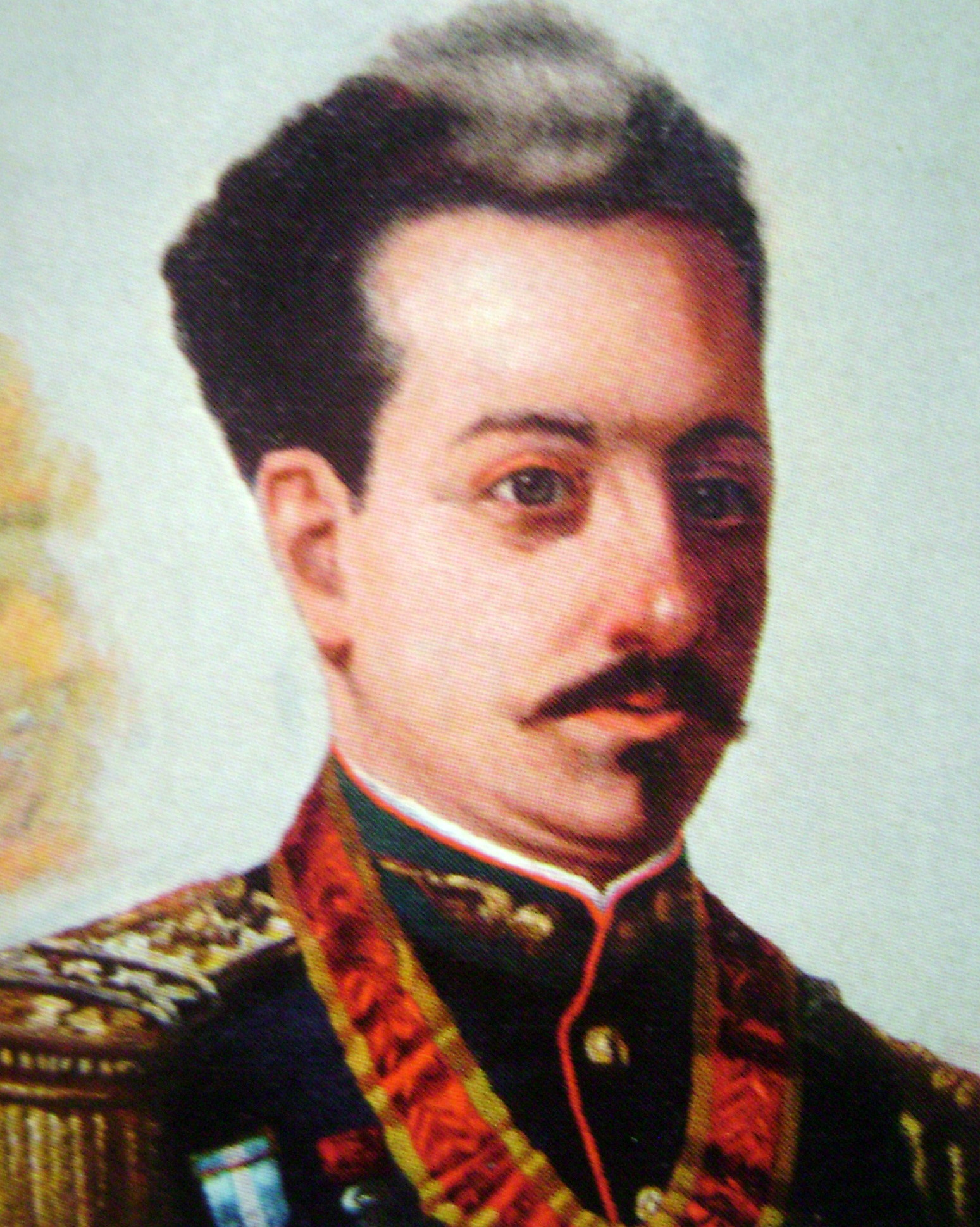

First Governor of Chubut
- In office 1884–1894
- Succeeded by: Eugenio Tello

Personal details
- Born: April 19, 1846 Buenos Aires, Argentina
- Died: October 18, 1920 (aged 74) San Juan, Argentina
- Occupation: Army officer, explorer, geographer, writer

Military service
- Allegiance: Argentina
- Branch/service: Argentine Army
- Rank: Lieutenant colonel

Luis Jorge Fontana (April 19, 1846, in Buenos Aires, Argentina – October 18, 1920, in San Juan, Argentina) was an Argentine military officer, explorer, geographer, writer, and politician. He was the first governor of the national territory of Chubut (now Chubut Province) and founder of the city of Formosa.

== Biography ==
Fontana was born in Buenos Aires on April 19, 1846. His father was an official in the government of Juan Manuel de Rosas. When Fontana was young, his family moved to Carmen de Patagones. At age thirteen, Fontana entered the Military Command of Río Negro as a trainee; he later fought in the Paraguayan War. After the war ended, he lived for a time in Buenos Aires, where he studied natural sciences, astronomy, and physics under Hermann Burmeister. He then returned to the army, and he was deployed on border expeditions exploring the Gran Chaco. During one expedition, he lost his left arm in a violent encounter with an indigenous group in the region.

In 1879, Fontana founded the city of Formosa, and he was awarded the rank of lieutenant colonel. He then returned to Patagonia, which he had visited as a child, and in 1884 he was named the first governor of the national territory of Chubut. There he directed the expedition to the west with an exploratory group named the Chubut Riflement (Rifleros del Chubut), which discovered the October 16 Valley (Valle 16 de Octubre), a fertile area in the foothills that would later be the site of the Welsh colony of Trevelin.

Fontana spent his later years in San Juan, where he held various public and community offices.

He died on October 18, 1920.

== See also ==
- List of governors of Chubut

== Principal works ==
- 1881: El Gran Chaco (The Gran Chaco), description of the geography, flora, and fauna of Northeast Argentina
- 1883: Viaje de exploración al río Pilcomayo (Exploratory journey to the Pilcomayo river)
- 1886: Estudio sobre el caballo fósil (Study of the fossil horse)
- 1886: Viaje de exploración a la Patagonia Austral (Exploratory journey to Southern Patagonia)
- 1908: Enumeración sistemática de las aves (Systematic counting of birds)
- 1912: Ad ovo, essay on prehistoric themes
