= Nancy González (politician) =

Argentine politician

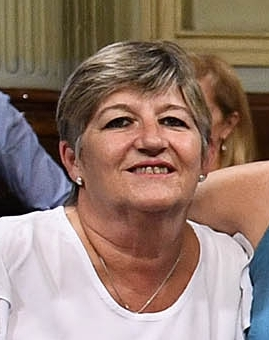

National Senator
- In office 10 December 2015 – 10 December 2021
- Constituency: Chubut

National Deputy
- In office 11 October 2006 – 10 December 2013
- Constituency: Chubut

Personal details
- Born: 10 February 1961 (age 65) Puerto Madryn, Argentina
- Party: Justicialist Party
- Other political affiliations: Front for Victory (2003–2017); Citizen's Unity (2017–2019); Frente de Todos (since 2019)

Nancy Susana González (born 10 February 1961) is an Argentine politician, who was a National Senator for Chubut from 2015 to 2021 and a National Deputy from 2006 to 2013. She belongs to the Justicialist Party.

== Early and personal life ==
González was born on 10 February 1961 in Puerto Madryn, Chubut. She worked as the director of a nursing home in her hometown between 1991 and 2003. She is married to Armando Santiago Bazán and has two children. González is Roman Catholic.

== Political career ==
In 2003, González was appointed Secretary of Social Action of Puerto Madryn by then-mayor Carlos Eliceche. In the 2005 legislative election, González was the first alternate candidate in the Front for Victory list to Argentine Chamber of Deputies. When deputy Aldo Marconetto, who had run in the FPV list alongside González, resigned from his seat in 2006, González took office as deputy in his stead. She was elected in her own right in the 2009 legislative election, as the second candidate in the Front for Victory list. González formed part of the parliamentary commissions on General Legislation, Elderly People, Social Action and Public Health, Regional Economies and Development, Families, Women and Childhood, and Population and Human Development.

In the 2015 general election, González was the second candidate in the FPV list to the National Senate, behind Juan Mario Pais. With 42.51% of the vote, the FPV was the most voted alliance in the province, and both Pais and González were elected for the majority as per the limited voting system used for the Argentine upper house. González was sworn in as senator on 3 December 2015. González formed part of the Front for Victory bloc, remaining in it even after most of its members broke away and formed the Argentina Federal bloc following the 2017 legislative election. After the 2019 general election, she formed part of the Frente de Todos bloc alongside nearly all other peronist senators: this meant all three senators from Chubut for the 2015–2021 term (González, Pais, and Luenzo) all formed part of the same bloc.

As senator, González formed part of the parliamentary commissions on Women's Affairs, Education and Culture, Labour and Social Prevision, Population and Human Development, Health, and Constitutional Affairs, and presided the commission on National Defense. She was a vocal supporter of the legalization of abortion in Argentina, voting in favour the two Voluntary Interruption of Pregnancy bill debated by the Argentine Congress in 2018 and 2020.

González did not stand for re-election in 2021, and her term expired on 10 December 2021.
