= Gerardo González =

Gerardo González may refer to:

- Gerardo González (sport shooter) (born 1932), Colombian sports shooter
- Gerardo González Aquino (born 1953), Paraguayan football manager and former player
- Gerardo Gonzalez Jr. (born 1987), figure at centre of controversial Gonzalez v. ICE case
- Gerardo González Valencia (born 1976), Mexican drug lord
- Gerardo Arturo González Sü (born 1984), Mexican entrepreneur
- Gerardo González Vernaza (1929-2000), Panamanian politician

== See also ==
- Giraldo González de la Renta, Puerto Rican farmer
