= Governor of Chubut Province =

- Provincial coat of Arms

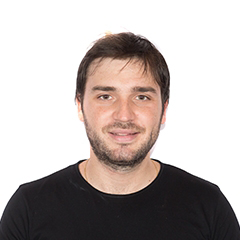
- Incumbent; Ignacio Torres since 9 December 2023
- Residence: Governor's residence in Rawson
- Appointer: Direct popular vote
- Term length: 4 years
- Inaugural holder: Luis Fontana
- Formation: 1884
- Website: http://www.chubut.gov.ar/site/gobierno

This is a list of the governors of Chubut, Argentina, first as a National Territory, then as a province. The Governor of Chubut is the highest executive officer of the province.

== Chubut National Territory ==
Term	Governor	Title
1884–1894	Luis Fontana	First governor
1895–1898	Eugenio Tello	2nd governor
1898–1900	Carlos O'Donell	
1900–1903	Alejandro Conesa	
1903–1909	Julio Lezana	
1909–1912	Alejandro Maiz	
1912–1913	Luis Ruiz Guiñazú	
1913–1917	Antonio Lamarque	
1918	Julio Ruiz Moreno	Federal interventor.
1919–1923	Orestes Franzoni	
1924–1925	Manuel Costa	
1925–1928	Domingo Castro	
1929–1930	Custodio Sixto	Federal Commissioner.
1930–1931	Domingo Castro	Federal Commissioner.
1931–1932	Abel Miranda	Federal Commissioner.
1932	Tesandro Santana	
1932–1941	José Manuel Baños	
1941–1943	Conrado Sztyrle	
1943–1944	Gregorio Baez	Federal Commissioner.
1944–1945	Ángel Solari	Federal Commissioner.
1946–1947	Raúl Rioboo	Federal Commissioner.
1947	Plácido Vilas López	Federal Interventor.
1947–1948	Ovidio Pracilio	Secretary
1947	Enrique Stenti	Secretary
1949	Horacio Arbeille	Government bureau.
1949–1950	Rafael Grillo	
1950–1951	José Eduardo Picerno	
1952–1955	Héctor Perurena	Federal Interventor
1955	Ítalo Dell’Oro	Federal Interventor
1955	Manuel Schneidewind	Federal Commissioner
1955–1958	Raúl Sidders	Federal Interventor.

== Chubut Province ==
Term	Governor	Title
1958–1962	Jorge Galina	1st governor of the province
1962	Fernando Elizondo	Federal Interventor
1962	Julio Petrochi	Federal Commissioner
1962	José Quintans	Federal Commissioner
1962–1963	Pedro Luis Priani	Federal Interventor
1963	Carlos Miranda Naon	Federal Commissioner.
1963–1965	Roque González	
1965	Armando Knischnik	Acting.
1965–1966	Manuel Pío Raso	
1966	Carlos Arturo Vellegal	Federal Interventor.
1966	Gerardo Ojanguren	Federal Commissioner.
1966–1967	Rodolfo Varela	Federal Interventor
1967–1968	Osvaldo Guaita	De facto governor
1968–1970	Guillermo Pérez Pitton	De facto governor
1970–1973	Jorge Costa	De facto governor
1973–1976	Benito Fernández	
1976	Rafael De Piano	Federal interventor.
1976–1978	Julio Etchegoyen	De facto governor
1978–1981	Ángel Martin	De facto governor
1981–1983	Niceto Echauri Ayerra	De facto governor
1983–1987	Atilio Oscar Viglione	
1987–1990	Néstor Perl	
1990–1991	Fernando Cosentino	Acting.
1991–1995	Carlos Maestro	
1995–1999	Carlos Maestro	
1999–2003	José Luis Lizurume	
2003–2007	Mario Das Neves	
2007–2011	Mario Das Neves	
2011–2015	Martín Buzzi	
2015–2017	Mario Das Neves	died in office
2017–2023	Mariano Arcioni	
2023–	Ignacio Torres	

== See also ==
- Legislature of Chubut
