= Natalia Sarapura =

Argentine politician

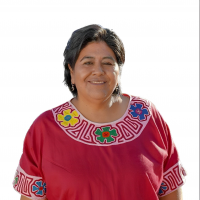

National Deputy
- In office 13 June 2023 – 10 December 2025
- Constituency: Jujuy

Minister of Human Development of Jujuy
- In office 30 January 2019 – 10 November 2022
- Governor: Gerardo Morales
- Preceded by: Ada Cecilia Galfre
- Succeeded by: Alejandra Martínez

Personal details
- Born: 27 February 1975 (age 51) San Salvador de Jujuy, Argentina
- Party: Radical Civic Union

Natalia Silvina Sarapura (born 27 February 1975) is an Argentine politician and indigenous rights activist. She was a member of the Argentine Chamber of Deputies from 2023 to 2025.

== Early life and career ==
Natalia Sarapura was born in 1975 in San Salvador de Jujuy, although her family is from Miraflores de la Candelaria, in Cochinoca Department, in the Puna region of Jujuy Province. She has identified herself as indigenous and as a member of the Qulla people, and has stated that part of her work has focused on strengthening indigenous identity and recovering knowledge associated with cultural practices.

Sarapura became involved with the Council of Aboriginal Organizations of Jujuy (COAJ) at the age of 14 and later served as its general coordinator. Through the organization, she participated in international bodies concerned with indigenous rights, including the United Nations Permanent Forum on Indigenous Issues, and took part in the negotiations preceding the adoption of the United Nations Declaration on the Rights of Indigenous Peoples.

== Political career ==
Before entering national politics, Sarapura held several municipal and provincial positions, including subdirector for women and youth, municipal secretary of culture, provincial deputy, secretary for indigenous peoples and minister of human development. She later served as a national deputy representing Jujuy. On 1 January 2026, she became Jujuy's secretary of public management, a position reporting directly to the provincial governor's office. Her role in the provincial administration has been criticized by some indigenous organizations and left-wing critics, particularly in relation to policies concerning communal territories, resource extraction and consultation with indigenous communities.

== See also ==
- List of Argentine deputies, 2023–2025
