= Melina Giorgi =

Argentine politician

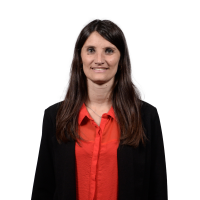

Member of the Argentine Chamber of Deputies
- Incumbent
- Assumed office 10 December 2023
- Constituency: Santa Fe Province

Personal details
- Party: Radical Civic Union

Melina Giorgi is an Argentine politician who was a member of the Argentine Chamber of Deputies from 2023 to 2025.

== See also ==
- List of Argentine deputies, 2023–2025
