= Rawson Department, Chubut =

Rawson
- Department
- Departamento Rawson
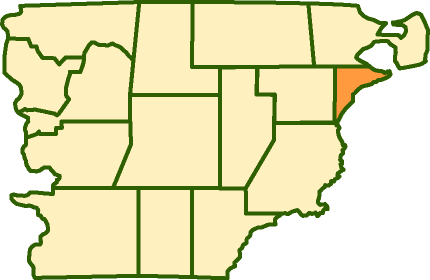
- location of Rawson Department in Chubut Province
- Coordinates: 43°17′S 65°05′W
- Country: Argentina
- Province: Chubut
- Foundation: February 25, 1906
- Founder: ?
- Capital: Rawson

Area
  - Total: 3,922 km^{2} (1,514 sq mi)

Population (2001 census [INDEC])
  - Total: 115,829
  - Density: 29.53/km^{2} (76.49/sq mi)
  - Change 1991-2001: +15.55%
- Post code: U9200
- Area code: 02965
- Resident: ?
- Distance to Buenos Aires: 1,404km
- Patron: ?
- Website: https://www.rawson.gov.ar

Rawson Department is a department of Chubut Province in Argentina.

The provincial subdivision has a population of about 115,829 inhabitants in an area of 3,922 km^{2}, and its capital city is Rawson, which is located around 1,404 km from the Capital federal.

== Settlements ==
- Playa Unión
- Puerto Rawson
- Rawson
- Trelew
- Playa Magagna
- Punta Ninfas
- Playa Santa Isabel
- Playa El Faro
