= Lourdes Arrieta =

Argentine politician (born 1993)

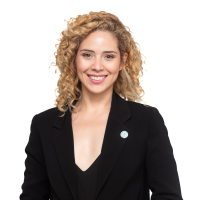
- Arrieta in 2024

Member of the Chamber of Deputies
- Incumbent
- Assumed office 10 December 2023
- Constituency: Mendoza

Personal details
- Born: 25 March 1993 (age 33)
- Party: La Libertad Avanza (2023–2024)

Lourdes Micaela Arrieta (born 25 March 1993) is an Argentine politician serving as a member of the Chamber of Deputies since 2023. From 2023 to 2024, she was a member of La Libertad Avanza.
