= We Are All Chubut =

Argentine political party

We Are All Chubut Chubut Somos Todos
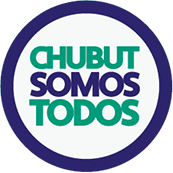
- Leader: Mariano Arcioni
- Founded: 2014; 12 years ago
- Headquarters: Rawson, Chubut Province
- Membership (2017): ▲2,513
- Ideology: Peronism; Regionalism; Federal Peronism
- Political position: Centre
- National affiliation: Renewal Front
- Argentine Chamber of Deputies (Chubut seats): 1 / 5
- Argentine Senate (Chubut seats): 1 / 3
- Seats in the Chubut Legislature: 16 / 27

Website
- Official website

We Are All Chubut (Spanish: Chubut Somos Todos; Welsh: Nid Ydy Chubut i gyd; ChuSoTo) is a provincial political party in the Chubut Province of Argentina. It was formed in 2014 to back the candidacy to the governorship of former governor Mario Das Neves. The party split from the provincial branch of the Justicialist Party.

Since its foundation, it has been aligned at the federal level with the Renewal Front, though ChuSoTo has declined to formally form part of the Frente de Todos coalition, of which the Renewal Front is a founding member. It currently holds a majority of seats in the Chubut provincial legislature and the incumbent governor, Mariano Arcioni (who first took office upon Das Neves's death in 2017), belongs to ChuSoTo.

== Electoral results ==
=== Chamber of Deputies ===
Election year	Votes	%	seats won	total seats	position	presidency	notes
2015	85,730	35.17	0	0 / 5	Minority	Mauricio Macri (PRO—Cambiemos)	within ChuSoTo Union Front (Note: The single elected deputy from the Frente Unión Chubut Somos Todos list, Jorge Taboada, is a member of the CET Party with which ChuSoTo was in alliance.)
2017	101,613	33.23	1	1 / 5	Minority	Mauricio Macri (PRO—Cambiemos)	within Chubut for All
2019	—N/a		0	1 / 5	Minority	Alberto Fernández (PJ—FDT)	did not participate

=== Senate ===
Election year	Votes	%	seats won	total seats	position	presidency
2015	85,396	34.96 (#2nd)	1	1 / 3	Mauricio Macri (PRO—Cambiemos)	within ChuSoTo Union Front

=== Chubut governorship ===
Election year	Candidate	# of overall votes	% of overall vote	Result	Notes
2015	Mario Das Neves	116,542	41.87 (1st)	✓ Elected	within ChuSoTo Union Front
2019	Mariano Arcioni	121,540	41.34 (1st)	✓ Elected	within Chubut Forward

=== Chubut provincial legislature ===
Election year	Votes	%	seats won	total seats	position	notes
2015	97,796	38.27 (#2nd)	8	8 / 27	Minority	within ChuSoTo Union Front
2019	174,084	48.33 (#1st)	8	16 / 27	Majority	within Chubut Forward
