= Martín Arjol =

Argentine politician

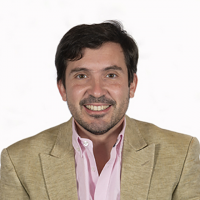

National Deputy
- Incumbent
- Assumed office 10 December 2021
- Constituency: Misiones

Personal details
- Born: 2 July 1981 (age 44)
- Party: Radical Civic Union
- Other political affiliations: Juntos por el Cambio (2019–2023)
- Occupation: Lawyer

Martín Arjol (born 2 July 1981) is an Argentine politician of the Radical Civic Union (UCR). Since 2021, he has been a National Deputy elected in Misiones Province.

In 2023, he unsuccessfully ran for governor of Misiones, losing against Hugo Passalacqua of the ruling Front for the Renewal of Concord.

== Biography ==
Arjol worked as a lawyer before he was elected in 2021.

== Electoral history ==
=== Executive ===
Electoral history of Martín Arjol
Election	Office	List	Votes			Result	Ref.
Election	Office	List	Total	%	P.	Result	Ref.
2023	Governor of Misiones	Juntos por el Cambio	175,759	26.57%	2nd	Not elected	

=== Legislative ===
Electoral history of Martín Arjol
Election	Office	List	#	District	Votes			Result	Ref.
Election	Office	List	#	District	Total	%	P.	Result	Ref.
2021	National Deputy	Juntos por el Cambio	1	Misiones	257,323	40.86%	1st (Note: Presented on an electoral list. The data shown represents the share of the vote the entire party/alliance received in that constituency.)	Elected	
