= Luciana Potenza =

Argentine politician (born 1994)

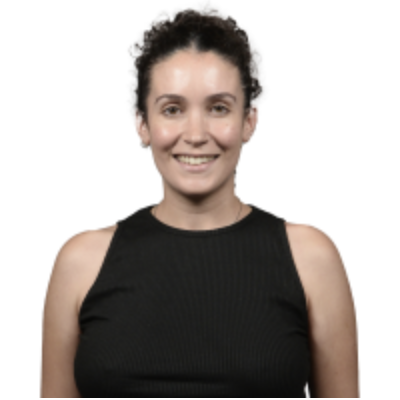
- Potenza in 2023

National Deputy
- Incumbent
- Assumed office 10 December 2023
- Constituency: Buenos Aires Province

Personal details
- Born: 1 November 1994 (age 31)
- Party: Justicialist Party

Luciana Potenza (born 1 November 1994) is an Argentine politician serving as a member of the Chamber of Deputies since 2023. She is the chairwoman of La Cámpora in La Matanza.
