= Yamila Lisette Ruíz =

Argentine politician

Member of the Chamber of Deputies of Argentina
- Incumbent
- Assumed office 10 December 2023
- Constituency: Misiones

Personal details
- Born: October 13, 1991 (age 34)
- Party: INNOVACIÓN FEDERAL
- Occupation: Lawyer

Yamila Lisette Ruíz is an Argentine politician who is a member of the Chamber of Deputies of Argentina.

== Biography ==
She was elected in 2023.
