= Roberto Mirabella =

Argentine politician

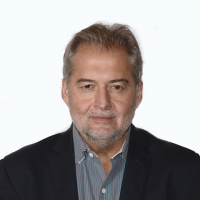

National Deputy
- Incumbent
- Assumed office 10 December 2021
- Constituency: Santa Fe

National Senator
- In office 10 December 2019 – 10 December 2021
- Constituency: Santa Fe

Provincial Deputy of Santa Fe
- In office 10 December 2011 – 10 December 2019
- In office 10 December 2003 – 10 December 2007

Personal details
- Born: 26 September 1966 (age 60) Rafaela, Argentina
- Party: Justicialist Party
- Other political affiliations: Front for Victory (2003–2017); Frente de Todos (2019–2023); Union for the Homeland (2023–present)
- Education: Universidad de Ciencias Empresariales y Sociales

Roberto Mario Mirabella (born 26 November 1966) is an Argentine educator and politician who has been a National Deputy since 2021, and served as a National Senator for Santa Fe from 2019 to 2021. A member of the Justicialist Party, Mirabella served three consecutive terms as a member of the Chamber of Deputies of Santa Fe, from 2003 to 2007 and later from 2011 to 2019.

== Early life and education ==
Mirabella was born on 26 November 1966 in Rafaela, Santa Fe Province. He studied commerce at the Universidad de Ciencias Empresariales y Sociales (UCES), and has a master's degree in Territorial Development from the National Technological University, where he has also taught courses in the Rafaela campus.

He is married to Rosana Claudia Figueroa and has two children.

== Political career ==
Mirabella was first elected to the Chamber of Deputies of Santa Fe, the lower house of the provincial legislature, in 2003. He was elected for a second non-consecutive term in 2011, and re-elected in 2015. Throughout his career, he has been close to Santa Fe Justicialist Party leader Omar Perotti.

In the 2015 legislative election, Mirabella was the first alternate candidate in the Front for Victory (FPV) list to the National Senate in Santa Fe, behind Perotti and María de los Ángeles Sacnun. The FPV list was the most voted in the province, and as such, both Perotti and Sacnun were elected by the majority as per the upper house's limited voting system. In 2019, when Perotti was elected Governor of Santa Fe, Mirabella filled in his vacancy. He was sworn in on 10 December 2019.

As senator, Mirabella formed part of the parliamentary commissions on Budget and Finances, Regional Economies, Agriculture and Livestock, and National Economy and Investment (the last of which he served in as vice president). He was a supporter of the legalisation of abortion in Argentina, voting in favour the 2020 Voluntary Interruption of Pregnancy bill which passed and made the practice legal in Argentina.

In the 2021 legislative election, Mirabella was the first candidate to the National Chamber of Deputies in the "Celeste y Blanca" list, which competed in the P.A.S.O. primaries within the Frente de Todos (FDT) and won. In the general election, the FDT list received 31.36% of the vote, enough for Mirabella to be elected.
