= Emiliano Estrada =

Argentine politician (born 1986)

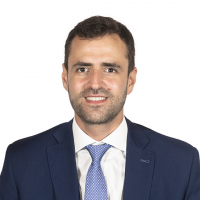

National Deputy
- In office 10 December 2021 – 10 December 2025
- Constituency: Salta

Minister of Economy of Salta Province
- In office 21 November 2017 – 23 August 2019
- Governor: Juan Manuel Urtubey
- Preceded by: Sebastián Gomeza
- Succeeded by: Juan Montero

Personal details
- Born: 12 April 1986 (age 40)
- Party: Justicialist Party
- Other political affiliations: Frente de Todos (2019–2023); Union for the Homeland (since 2023)

Emiliano Estrada (born 12 April 1986) is an Argentine economist and politician. He was a National Deputy elected in Salta Province from 2021 to 2025, and served as Minister of Economy of Salta Province under Governor Juan Manuel Urtubey from 2017 to 2019. He is a member of the Justicialist Party.

In 2023, he unsuccessfully ran for governor of Salta, placing third with 16.16% of the vote.

== Biography ==
Estrada is the second child of 3, and was an economist before he was elected in 2021.

== Electoral history ==
=== Executive ===
Electoral history of Emiliano Estrada
Election	Office	List	Votes			Result	Ref.
Election	Office	List	Total	%	P.	Result	Ref.
2019	Vice Governor of Salta	Frente de Todos	184,987	26.30%	2nd	Not elected	
2023	Governor of Salta	Avancemos	114,867	16.16%	3rd	Not elected	

=== Legislative ===
Electoral history of Emiliano Estrada
Election	Office	List	#	District	Votes			Result	Ref.
Election	Office	List	#	District	Total	%	P.	Result	Ref.
2021	National Deputy	Frente de Todos	1	Salta	205,853	32.81%	1st (Note: Presented on an electoral list. The data shown represents the share of the vote the entire party/alliance received in that constituency.)	Elected	
