= Fernando Carbajal =

Argentine politician

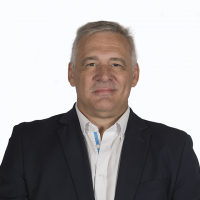

National Deputy
- Incumbent
- Assumed office 10 December 2021
- Constituency: Formosa

Personal details
- Born: 15 August 1964 (age 61)
- Party: Radical Civic Union

Fernando Carbajal (born 15 August 1964) is an Argentine politician who is a member of the Chamber of Deputies of Argentina elected in Formosa Province.

== Biography ==
Carbajal worked as a lawyer before he was elected in 2021. In 2023 he unsuccessfully ran for governor of Formosa.
