= Roberto Antonio Sánchez =

Argentine politician

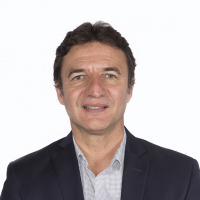
- Official portrait, 2021

Member of the Chamber of Deputies of Argentina
- Incumbent
- Assumed office 10 December 2021
- Constituency: Tucuman

Personal details
- Born: 17 August 1966 (age 59)
- Party: Radical Civic Union
- Occupation: Agronomist

Roberto Antonio Sánchez is an Argentine politician who is a member of the Chamber of Deputies of Argentina.

== Biography ==
Sánchez worked as an agronomist before being elected in 2021.
