= Sabrina Ajmechet =

Argentine politician and historian (born 1981)

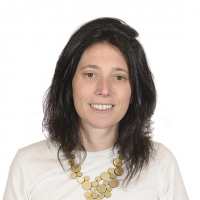

National Deputy
- Incumbent
- Assumed office 10 December 2021
- Constituency: City of Buenos Aires

Personal details
- Born: 22 August 1981 (age 44) Buenos Aires, Argentina
- Party: LLA (since 2025)
- Other political affiliations: PRO (2021–2023); Independent (2023–2025)
- Spouse: Gabriel Palumbo (died 2023)
- Children: 1
- Occupation: Historian and politician

Sabrina Ajmechet (born 22 August 1981) is an Argentine historian, professor and politician who has sat as a National Deputy of Argentina since 2021, elected in the City of Buenos Aires.

== Biography ==
Ajmechet was born on 22 August 1981 in Buenos Aires into a Jewish family. She studied political science at the University of Buenos Aires Faculty of Social Sciences, later completing a doctoral degree on history from the same university. She worked as a historian, professor and researcher, and wrote occasional columns for La Nación and Infobae.

In 2024, the deputy received criticism for her political opinions against Argentina’s claim of sovereignty over the Malvinas, against Argentine national symbols, and for her constant attacks on Catholicism. According to her own words, she received antisemitic threats because of her religion. Ajmechet is one of the founders of the Argentine Forum Against Antisemitism.

== Electoral history ==
Electoral history of Sabrina Ajmechet
Election	Office	List	#	District	Votes			Result	Ref.
Election	Office	List	#	District	Total	%	P.	Result	Ref.
2021	National Deputy	Juntos por el Cambio	7	City of Buenos Aires	867,044	47.09%	1st (Note: Presented on an electoral list. The data shown represents the share of the vote the entire party/alliance received in that constituency.)	Elected	
