= Gerardo Arturo González Sü =

Mexican entrepreneur (born 1984)

Gerardo Arturo González Sü (born March 2, 1984) is a Mexican entrepreneur.

== Early years ==
Gonzalez was born in Guadalajara and had early childhood in Dallas, Texas. He studied firstly at TEC de Monterrey Campus Guadalajara International Negotiations. Afterwards, he would study in ESC Dijon where he would do his international studies at an Exchange Program.

== Biography ==
Back in Guadalajara, he worked at a local television program called "Bodas+Modas TV". Aside his journalistic work, he has also been judge of many beauty pageant contests such as Miss Polonia Webmasters 2006.
