= Legislature of Chubut =

Legislative body of Chubut Province, Argentina

Type
- Type: Unicameral

Leadership
- President (Vice Governor): Gustavo Menna (JxC)
- First Vice President: Luis Juncos (JxC)
- Second Vice President: Tatiana Goic (FP)

Structure
- Seats: 27 legislators
- Political groups: Government (16): Wake Up Chubut (16); Opposition (11): Homeland Force (7); La Libertad Avanza (3); Workers' Left Front (1)
- Length of term: 4 years
- Authority: Constitution of Chubut

Elections
- Voting system: Proportional representation Majority bonus system
- Last election: 2023
- Next election: 2027

Meeting place
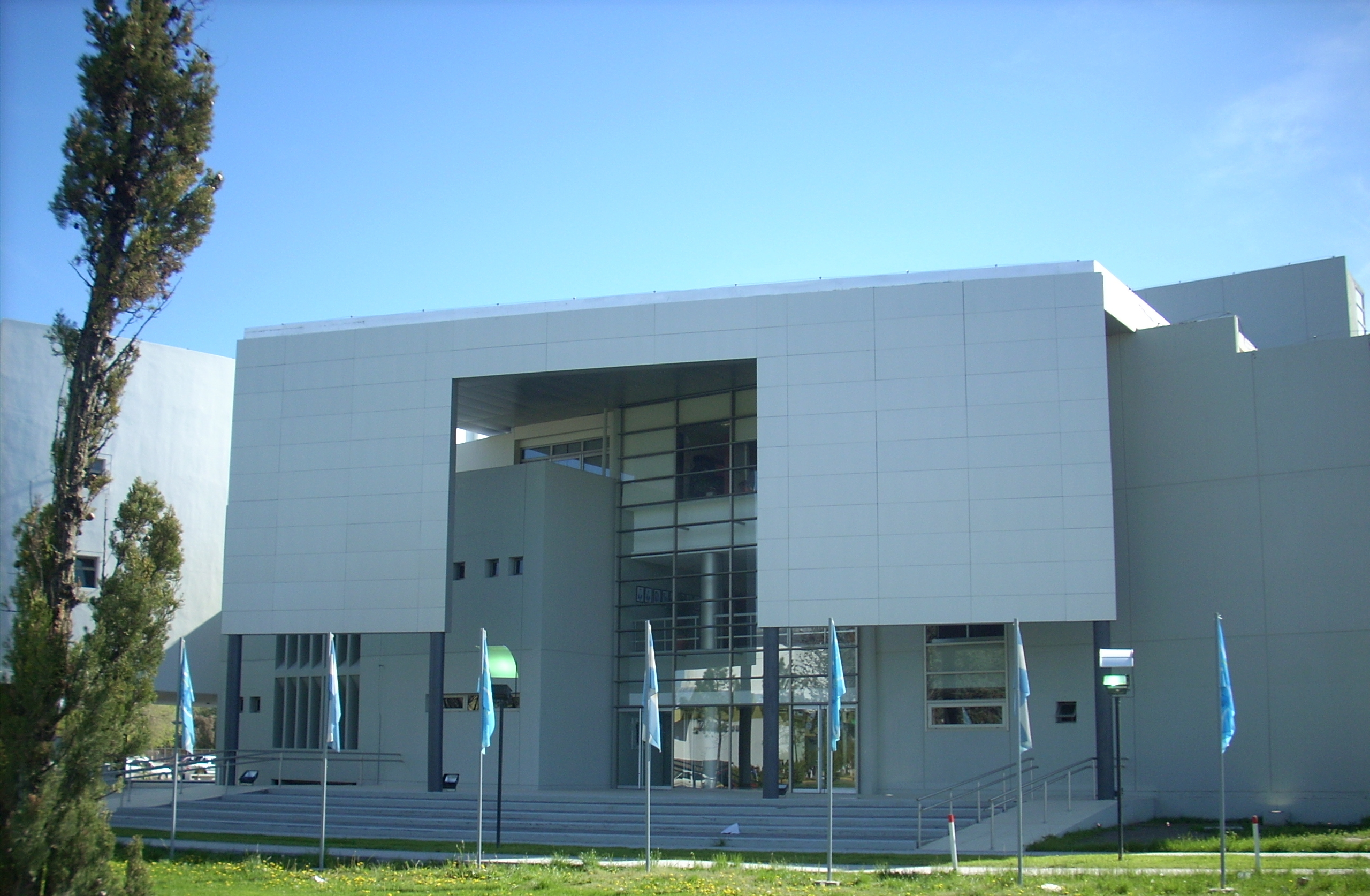
- Edificio de la Legislatura, Rawson

Website
- legischubut.gov.ar

The Legislature of Chubut Province (Spanish: Legislatura de la Provincia del Chubut) is the unicameral legislative body of Chubut Province, in Argentina. It convenes in the provincial capital, Rawson.

It comprises 27 legislators, 16 of whom are elected in a single province-wide multi-member district through proportional representation, while the remaining 11 seats are distributed through the majority bonus system.

Its powers and responsibilities are established in the provincial constitution. The legislature is presided by the Vice Governor of Chubut (presently Gustavo Menna of the Wake Up Chubut alliance), who is elected alongside the governor.

== History ==
The Legislature of Chubut was established after the National Territory of Chubut became an official province of Argentina in 1955. The first provincial constitution was adopted in 1957, and the first legislature convened in February 1958, on the same day the first constitutional governor of the province took office.

== Seat ==
The Legislature has its seat on Mitre 550, in the provincial capital of Rawson. Since 2019, the building has endured repeated damage during protests against the provincial government of Mariano Arcioni. Damage has included a major fire that affected the facade in 2019, and rendered most of the building unusable due to a high concentration of toxic soot. In 2021, following protests against Governor Arcioni's proposed pro-mining law, the building once again had to undergo renovations.
