= Paula Penacca =

Argentine politician

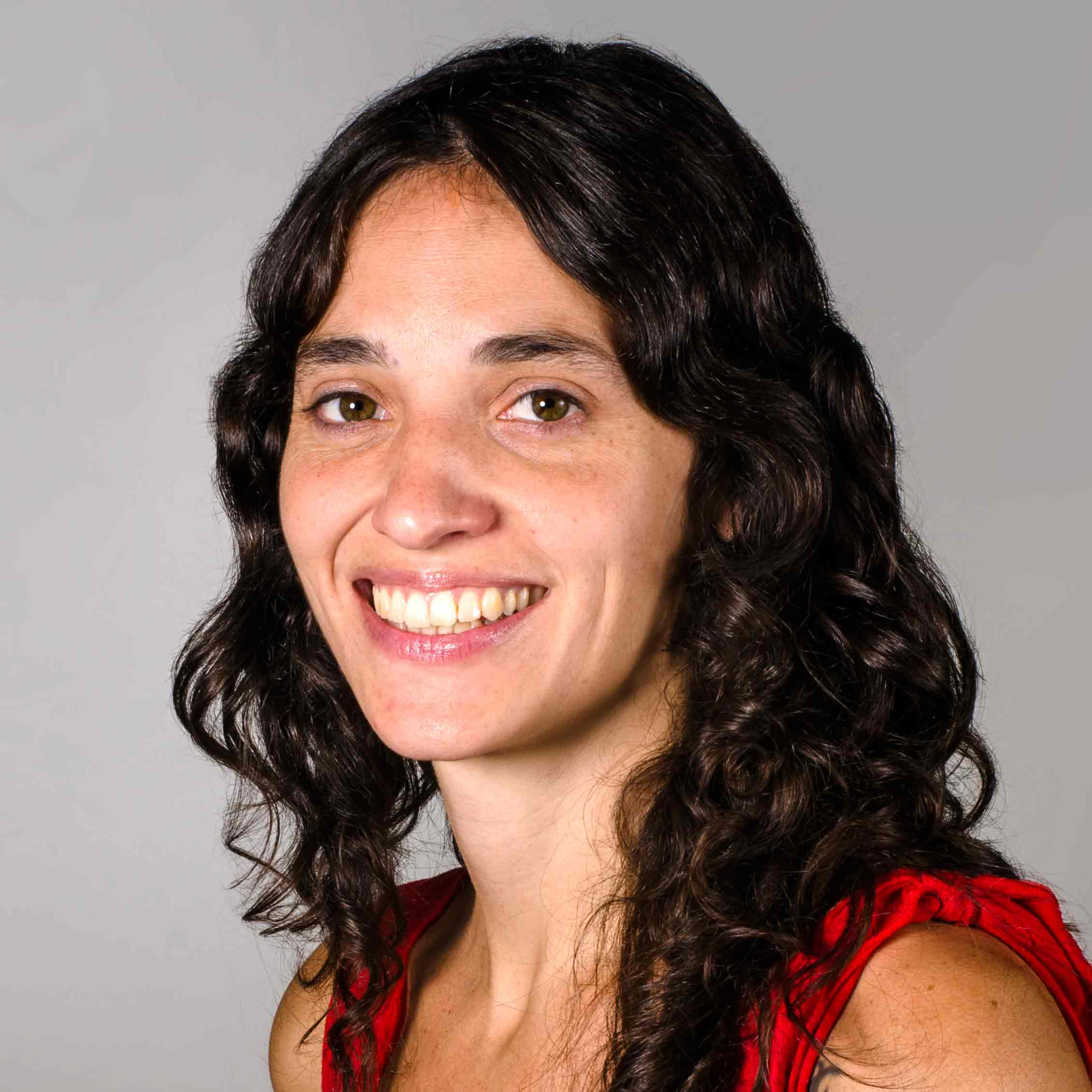

National Deputy
- Incumbent
- Assumed office 10 December 2019
- Constituency: City of Buenos Aires

Legislator of the City of Buenos Aires
- In office 12 December 2013 – 10 December 2019

Personal details
- Born: 27 April 1981 (age 45) Zárate, Argentina
- Party: Justicialist Party
- Other political affiliations: Front for Victory (2003–2017); Unidad Porteña (2017–2019); Frente de Todos (2019–2023); Union for the Homeland (2023–present)
- Profession: Politician, social activist

Paula Andrea Penacca (born 27 April 1981) is an Argentine politician and social activist, who is currently a member of the Argentine Chamber of Deputies. She was elected in the Autonomous City of Buenos Aires since 2019, for the Frente de Todos coalition. A member of the Justicialist Party and La Cámpora, Penacca previously served as a member of the Buenos Aires City Legislature from 2013 to 2019.

== Early life ==
Penacca was born on 27 April 1981 in Zárate, Buenos Aires Province, though she has lived in the City of Buenos Aires since she was 5 years old. Her father was a sympathizer of the Radical Civic Union and of Raúl Alfonsín. She has stated that the economic hardships her family faced during the 1990s inspired her to become politically active; she began her political involvement in public schools in the villas of Buenos Aires. Following the election of Néstor Kirchner as president of Argentina in 2003, Penacca became involved in La Cámpora.

Later, she would be instrumental in the organization of La Cámpora in Villa 20, in the barrio of Lugano. She has also been active in Villa 31.

== Political career ==
In the 2011 general election, Penacca was the 6th candidate in the Front for Victory list to the Buenos Aires City Legislature. Although the list received 14.02% of the vote and Penacca was not elected, she assumed office upon Alejandro Amor's resignation in 2013. Penacca was re-elected in 2015, this time as the second candidate in the Front for Victory list.

=== National Deputy ===
Penacca was the second candidate in the Buenos Aires City Frente de Todos list to the Argentine Chamber of Deputies in the 2019 general election, behind Fernando "Pino" Solanas; the list received 34.22% of the popular vote, and Penacca was elected. She took office on 10 December 2019.

Penacca was one of the 131 members of the Chamber of Deputies who voted in favor of the 2020 Voluntary Interruption of Pregnancy bill, which later went on to be passed by the Senate and legalize abortion in Argentina. During the debate, Penacca stated that "without [legal access to] abortion, there is no social justice".

Penacca forms part of and presides the parliamentary commission on internal security. In 2021, she presented a bill to establish a protocol against institutional violence, backed by a number of human rights activists as well as the Security Ministry.

== Electoral history ==
Electoral history of Paula Penacca
Election	Office	List	#	District	Votes			Result	Ref.
Election	Office	List	#	District	Total	%	P.	Result	Ref.
2011	City Legislator	Front for Victory	6	City of Buenos Aires	247,140	14.07%	2nd (Note: Presented on an electoral list. The data shown represents the share of the vote the entire party/alliance received in that constituency.)	Not elected (Note: Assumed office on 12 December 2013 following the resignation of Alejandro Amor.)	
2015	City Legislator	Front for Victory	2	City of Buenos Aires	380,806	20.76%	3rd	Elected	
2019	National Deputy	Frente de Todos	2	City of Buenos Aires	641,054	35.02%	2nd	Elected	
2023	National Deputy	Union for the Homeland	1	City of Buenos Aires	577,225	31.41%	2nd	Elected	
