= Ignacio Torres (politician) =

Argentine politician

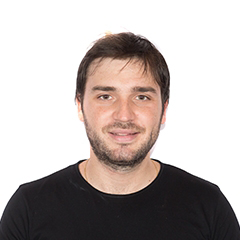

Governor of Chubut
- Incumbent
- Assumed office 10 December 2023
- Vice Governor: Gustavo Menna
- Preceded by: Mariano Arcioni

National Senator
- In office 10 December 2021 – 10 December 2023
- Constituency: Chubut

National Deputy
- In office 10 December 2019 – 10 December 2021
- Constituency: Chubut

Personal details
- Born: Ignacio Agustín Torres; 4 May 1988 (age 38) Trelew, Argentina
- Party: Republican Proposal
- Other political affiliations: Juntos por el Cambio (2015–present)
- Education: Argentine University of Enterprise

Ignacio Agustín "Nacho" Torres (born 4 May 1988) is an Argentine politician, currently serving as Governor of Chubut Province since 2023. He previously served as a National Senator for Chubut. A member of Republican Proposal (PRO), Torres was elected in 2021 and sits in the Juntos por el Cambio parliamentary inter-bloc. He also served as a National Deputy from 2019 to 2021.

== Early life and education ==
Torres was born on 4 May 1988 in Trelew, Chubut Province. He grew up in the Los Olmos neighbourhood of Trelew, and studied at Escuela 199 and Escuela 712. He has a degree (2012) in Administrative Analysis and a licenciate degree (2013) on business administration from the Argentine University of Enterprise (UADE).

== Political career ==
In 2015, he became president of the Chubut chapter of Fundación Pensar, the official think tank of Republican Proposal (PRO); he held the position until 2020. In 2015, he was also appointed executive director of the Chubut PAMI, a position he held until 2017. From March to December 2019, he was coordinator of the Patagonian Development Table of the Interior Ministry, under then-minister Rogelio Frigerio.

In the 2019 legislative election, Torres ran in the Juntos por el Cambio list (of which PRO formed part) to the Chamber of Deputies in Chubut as the first candidate. Torres' list came second in the general election, with 32.29% of the vote against the Frente de Todos' 53.45%, enough for Torres to be elected. He was sworn in on 4 December 2019. Upon being sworn in, he became the youngest deputy in Congress, at 31 years old.

As a deputy, Torres formed part of the parliamentary commissions on Transport, Regional Economies and Development, Elderly People, Consumer Rights and Competition, Tax Norms, and Maritime Interests. He was an opponent of the 2020 Voluntary Interruption of Pregnancy bill, which legalized abortion in Argentina.

=== National Senator ===
Torres was the first candidate in the Juntos por el Cambio list to the Chubut seats in the Argentine Senate in the 2021 legislative election. Juntos por el Cambio was the most voted list in the province, with 37.87% of the vote, granting Torres and the second candidate in the list, Edith Terenzi, the two seats for the majority as per the limited voting system used for the Argentine upper house. He took office on 10 December 2021.

=== Governor of Chubut ===
In the July 2023 provincial elections, he was elected Governor of Chubut Province with 35% of the vote. He took office on 10 December 2023.

Political offices
| Preceded by Mariano Arcioni | Governor of Chubut; 2023–present | Incumbent |
