= Mariano Arcioni =

Argentinian politician

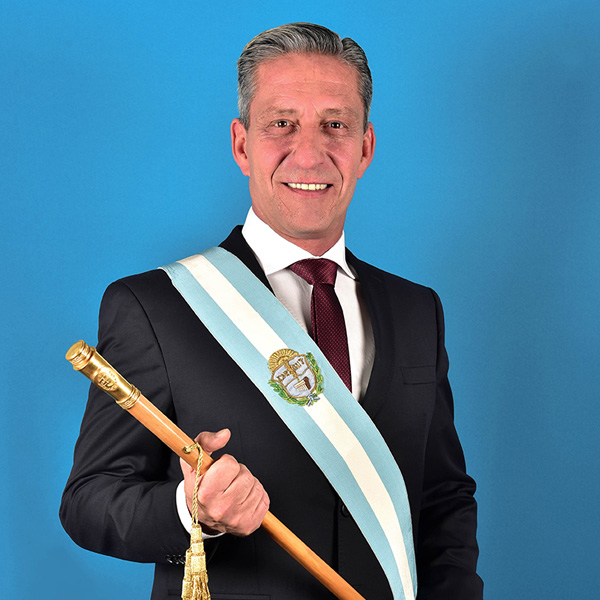

Governor of Chubut
- In office 1 November 2017 – 10 December 2023
- Vice Governor: Ricardo Sastre
- Preceded by: Mario Das Neves
- Succeeded by: Ignacio Torres

Vice Governor of Chubut
- In office 10 December 2015 – 1 November 2017
- Governor: Mario Das Neves
- Preceded by: Gustavo Mac Karthy
- Succeeded by: Ricardo Sastre

Personal details
- Born: 2 April 1970 (age 56) Comodoro Rivadavia, Argentina
- Party: We Are All Chubut (2015–present)
- Other political affiliations: Renewal Front (2015–present)
- Education: University of Belgrano; Universidad del Salvador

Mariano Ezequiel Arcioni (born 2 April 1970) is an Argentine politician who served as governor of Chubut Province from 2017 to 2023. From 2015 to 2017, he was the province's vice governor under Mario Das Neves, whose office Arcioni took upon Das Neves's death on 31 October 2017.

== Early life and education ==
Mariano Ezequiel Arcioni was born in Comodoro Rivadavia, in Chubut Province, on 2 April 1970. Arcioni finished high school at Comodoro Rivadavia's Liceo Militar General Roca. In 1995 he received his licenciatura in law from the Buenos Aires–based University of Belgrano, and later completed a degree from Universidad del Salvador to work as a scrivener.

== Political career ==
Ahead of the 2015 general election, former governor Mario Das Neves chose Arcioni as his running mate in the race for the governorship of Chubut. The ticket, supported by the newly formed We Are All Chubut (Chusoto) party, won with 41.87% of the popular vote.

Arcioni was the first candidate in the Chusoto Chamber of Deputies list for the 2017 legislative election; the list was the most voted in the province with 33.23% of the vote and Arcioni was elected. However, a month before Arcioni could take office as National Deputy, Governor Das Neves died of complications from his colon cancer and Arcioni assumed the governorship on his stead.

=== Governorship ===
Arcioni was sworn in as governor on 1 November 2017. In the 2019 general election, Arcioni's Chusoto party formed an alliance with two other provincial parties and formed the Chubut al Frente ("Chubut Forward") alliance to back his candidacy to the governorship. His running mate was Puerto Madryn mayor Ricardo Sastre. On election day, the Chubut al Frente ticket won with 41.34% of the vote.

During Arcioni's second term, his administration has been subject to a number of controversies. In September 2019, the provincial government's inability to pay public sector workers their full wages led to protests that were forcibly quashed by provincial police forces. Throughout 2020 there were also protests against Arcioni's policy on surface mining in Chubut, seemingly backtracking on his campaign promises.

Political offices
Preceded by Gustavo Mac Karthy	Vice Governor of Chubut; 2015–2017	Succeeded by Ricardo Sastre
Preceded by Mario Das Neves	Governor of Chubut; 2017–2023	Succeeded by Ignacio Torres
