= Rawson, Chubut =

Rawson Trerawson
- City
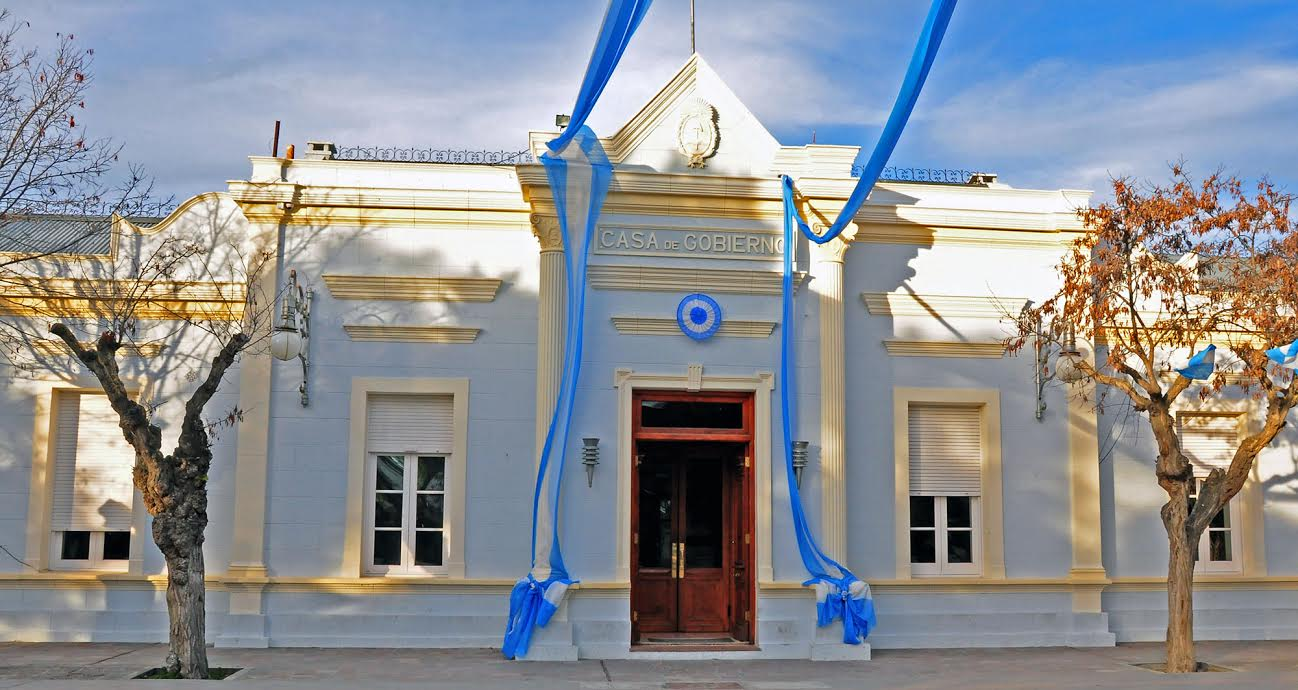
- Government House of Chubut

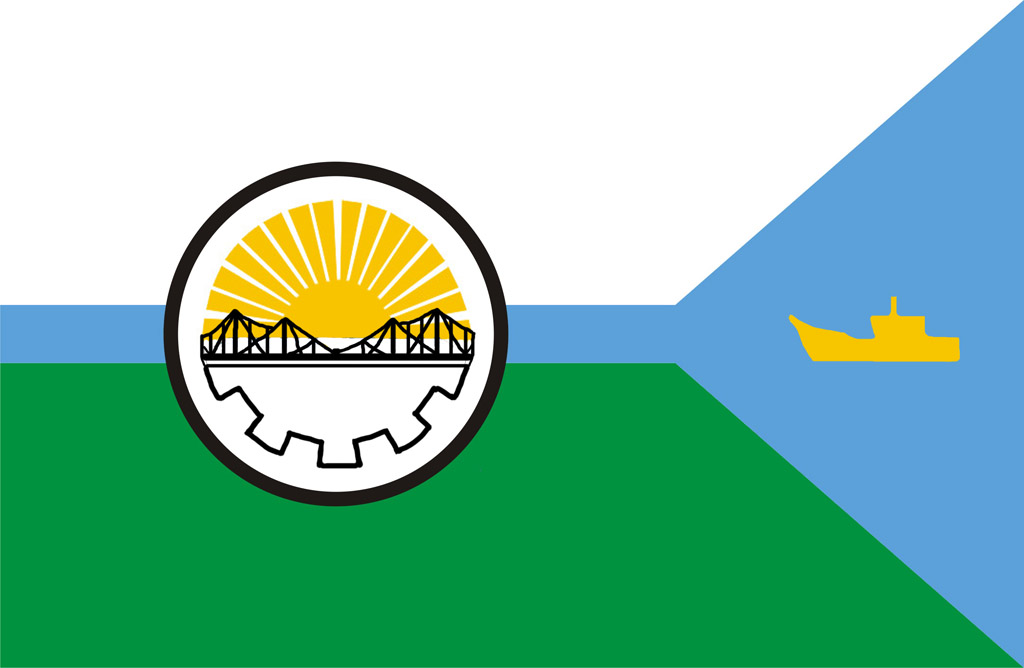
- Flag Coat of arms

- Location of Rawson in Argentina
- Coordinates: 43°18′S 65°6′W
- Country: Argentina
- Province: Chubut
- Department: Rawson
- Named for: Guillermo Rawson

Government
  - Intendant: Damián Biss (Radical Civic Union)
- Elevation: 4 m (13 ft)

Population (2010 census)
  - Total: 24,616
- Demonym: Rawsense
- Time zone: UTC−3 (ART)
- CPA base: U9103
- +54: 0280
- Climate: BWk
- Website: Official website

Rawson (Spanish: [ˈrawson]; Welsh: [ˈrau̯sɔn]) is the capital of the Argentine province of Chubut, in Patagonia. It has 24,616 inhabitants in 2010, and it is the chief town of the Rawson Department.

The city is named after Guillermo Rawson (1821–1890), Argentine Minister of the Interior, who supported the Welsh settlement in Argentina.

Rawson is located about 1,360 km (850 mi) south of Buenos Aires, some 20 km (12 mi) from Trelew, and it is served by the Almirante Marco Andrés Zar Airport in Trelew. It lies on both sides of the Chubut River.

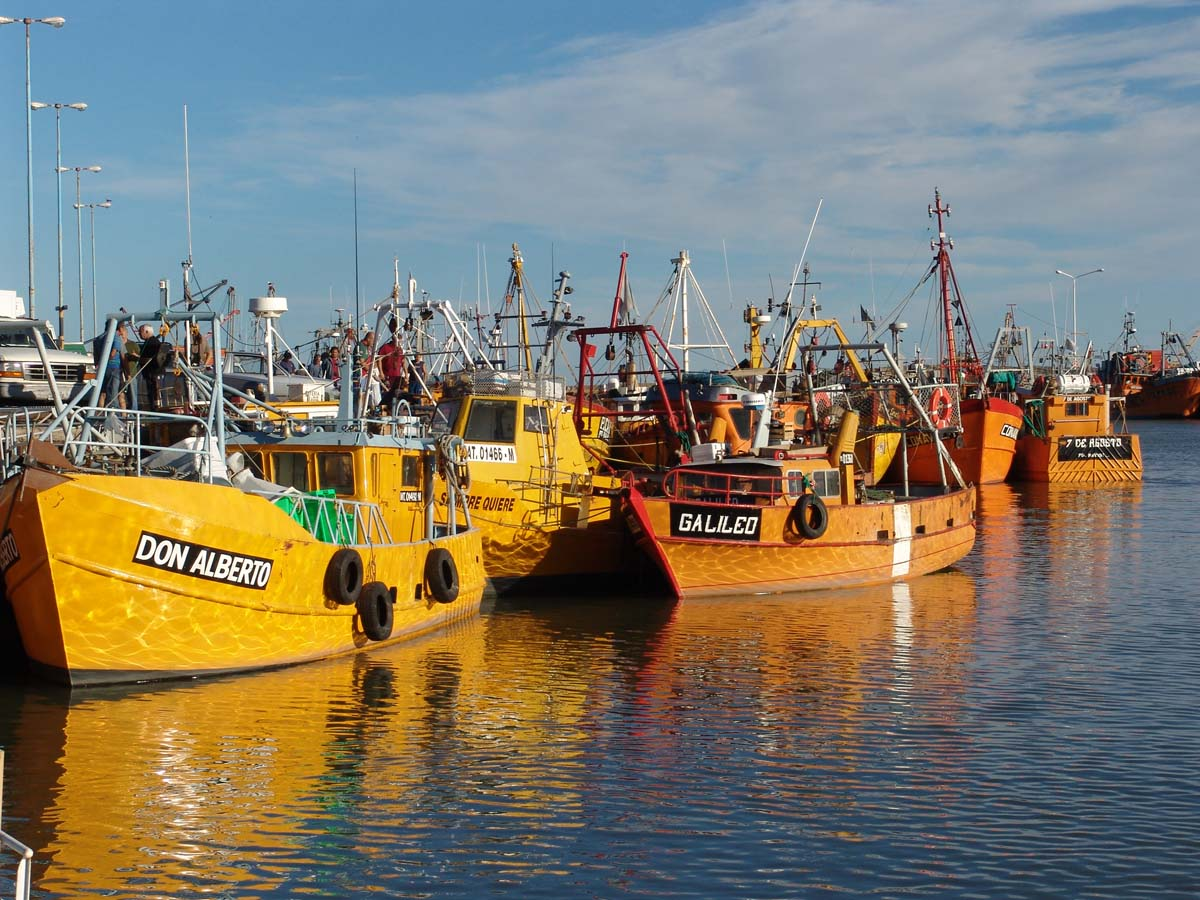
Fishing trawlers in Puerto Rawson

The city has a fishing port, Puerto Rawson, on the Atlantic coast, 5 km (3 mi) down the river.

== History ==
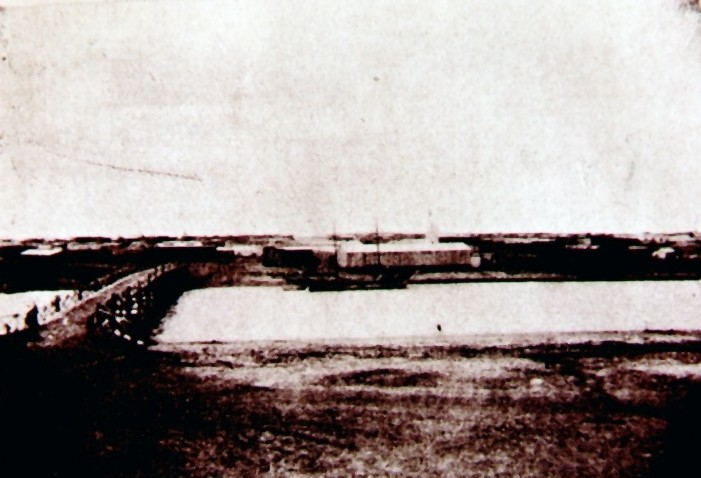
First wooden bridge over the Chubut River

Rawson was the first town founded by the Welsh immigrants who sailed on the clipper Mimosa in 1865 to establish a national colony.

At the time of founding remains of a mud-walled fortress existed on the site. Settlers dwelled in the fortress various months while they explored the surroundings and built permanent houses. It has been posited that the fort was built in 1853 by non-Indigenous hunters who entered the area to hunt feral cattle. The fortress was known by various names by the settlers. One name was Yr Hen Amddiffynfa meaning "Old Fortress", another was Caer Antur meaning "Fort Adventure". Henry Libanus Jones had called it "Fuerte Paz" in his 1861 Explanatory notes on two maps of Patagonia.

Between 1885 and 1890 many Italians settled in Rawson. Initially many Italians worked as railway navvies but in time many moved to work in trade.

The first bridge over the Chubut in Rawson was built of wood in 1889 by the carpenter and Welsh-language poet Griffith Griffiths (1829–1909), who wrote under the bardic name Gutyn Ebrill and established the Patagonia Gorsedd of Bards. This bridge was destroyed by a flood ten years later, and was replaced by an iron bridge in 1917. In 2001 a decision was made to rename the iron bridge as Puente del Poeta (poet's bridge) in honor of Griffiths. A plaque was installed at the bridge with information on Griffiths.

Rawson was flooded in 1899 and 1901. While there had been floods before, these floods caused a partial depopulation of the town with many choosing to resettle in Trelew. Trelew was temporarily made capital of Chubut in 1903 as Rawson recovered from the floods. This fuelled a rivalry between the towns, which was further compounded by differences in their ethnic make-up as Rawson was more Catholic and had a higher proportion of Argentines, Italians and Spanish relative to Trelew. Rawson regained the capital status soon thereafter.

== Climate ==
Rawson experiences a borderline cold desert (Köppen BWk)/cold semi-desert (BSk) climate with hot summers, cool winters and low precipitation year-round.

Climate data for Trelew/Rawson (1991–2020, extremes 1901–present)
Month	Jan	Feb	Mar	Apr	May	Jun	Jul	Aug	Sep	Oct	Nov	Dec	Year
Record high °C (°F)	42.2 (108.0)	41.0 (105.8)	40.0 (104.0)	35.3 (95.5)	31.0 (87.8)	27.7 (81.9)	25.6 (78.1)	27.4 (81.3)	33.0 (91.4)	36.4 (97.5)	38.3 (100.9)	41.2 (106.2)	42.2 (108.0)
Mean daily maximum °C (°F)	29.3 (84.7)	28.0 (82.4)	25.4 (77.7)	21.0 (69.8)	16.1 (61.0)	12.6 (54.7)	12.4 (54.3)	15.0 (59.0)	17.6 (63.7)	21.2 (70.2)	24.8 (76.6)	27.5 (81.5)	20.9 (69.6)
Daily mean °C (°F)	21.6 (70.9)	20.2 (68.4)	17.9 (64.2)	13.5 (56.3)	9.5 (49.1)	6.4 (43.5)	5.9 (42.6)	8.0 (46.4)	10.4 (50.7)	14.1 (57.4)	17.4 (63.3)	20.0 (68.0)	13.7 (56.7)
Mean daily minimum °C (°F)	13.7 (56.7)	12.6 (54.7)	10.8 (51.4)	7.0 (44.6)	3.6 (38.5)	1.0 (33.8)	0.3 (32.5)	1.9 (35.4)	3.7 (38.7)	6.6 (43.9)	9.6 (49.3)	12.0 (53.6)	6.9 (44.4)
Record low °C (°F)	3.0 (37.4)	1.5 (34.7)	−1.6 (29.1)	−4.9 (23.2)	−10.7 (12.7)	−12.3 (9.9)	−11.4 (11.5)	−10.6 (12.9)	−8.0 (17.6)	−5.0 (23.0)	−2.0 (28.4)	0.5 (32.9)	−12.3 (9.9)
Average precipitation mm (inches)	11.9 (0.47)	23.5 (0.93)	21.0 (0.83)	23.3 (0.92)	22.6 (0.89)	25.4 (1.00)	17.4 (0.69)	14.1 (0.56)	14.7 (0.58)	18.1 (0.71)	12.9 (0.51)	13.2 (0.52)	218.1 (8.59)
Average precipitation days (≥ 0.1 mm)	3.9	4.3	5.2	3.8	6.6	6.8	5.6	6.1	5.9	5.7	4.6	3.7	62.1
Average snowy days	0.0	0.0	0.0	0.0	0.1	0.2	0.5	0.2	0.1	0.0	0.0	0.0	1.0
Average relative humidity (%)	42.1	49.8	52.9	56.9	65.0	67.5	66.3	59.7	56.0	49.7	44.4	41.4	54.3
Mean monthly sunshine hours	322.4	279.7	251.1	210.0	161.2	138.0	161.2	179.8	198.0	248.0	282.0	294.5	2,725.9
Mean daily sunshine hours	10.4	9.9	8.1	7.0	5.2	4.6	5.2	5.8	6.6	8.0	9.4	9.5	7.5
Percentage possible sunshine	67.0	69.3	65.3	60.3	51.3	50.0	47.3	53.7	55.0	59.7	65.0	55.3	58.3
Source 1: Servicio Meteorológico Nacional
Source 2: Meteo Climat (record highs and lows) Secretaria de Mineria (percent sun 1941–1990, April, August and December record highs, and May record low only)

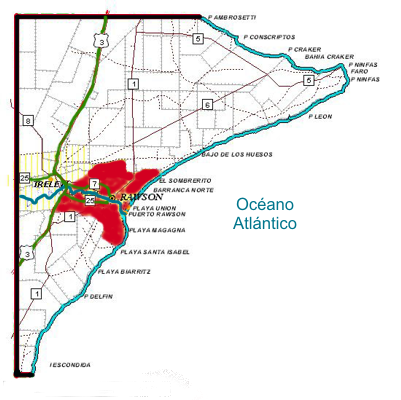
Map of the town

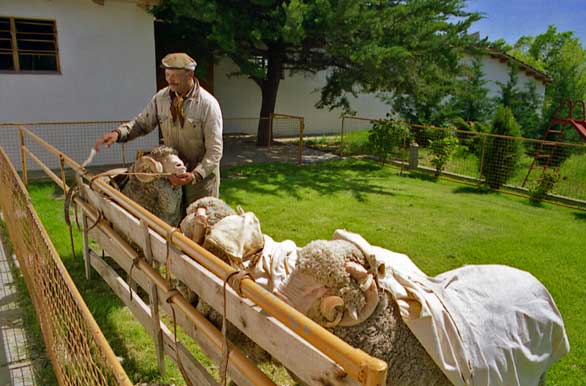
Homeowner and his Merino sheep.

== Notable people ==
- Andrés Yllana, (born 1974), footballer
- Sergio Bastida, (born 1979), Argentine-born Bolivian footballer
- Gabriel Calderón, (born 1960), footballer and manager
- Rubén Ferrer, (born 1975), footballer
- Eduardo Sepúlveda, (born 1991), cyclist
- Cristian Tula, (born 1978), footballer

== Twinned towns ==
- Blaenau Ffestiniog in Wales, United Kingdom
