= Evacuations during the Gaza war =

Following the outbreak of the Gaza war, many countries evacuated their citizens from Israel and Gaza as well as from the areas under the control of the Palestinian Authority. Israel also evacuated many of its citizens from certain areas, close to Gaza or survivors of areas that were attacked on 7 October 2023.

== Timeline ==
=== October 2023 ===
Shortly after the 7 October attacks Israel evacuated many settlements affected by the attacks, placing evacuees in hotels and apartments in other parts of Israel. About 200,000 people were evacuated from the border areas that Israel shares with the Gaza Strip and Lebanon. Some of the evacuated areas included Kibbutz Kfar Aza which was attacked and about 1.2 miles from the Gaza Strip and the Sasa kibbutz about 1.9 miles from the Lebanese border. Some of the apartments that were donated to evacuated civilians had been initially earmarked for Ukrainian refugees fleeing the Russian invasion of Ukraine, but were later repurposed.

==== 8 October ====
The Brazilian Air Force (FAB) deployed six military aircraft bound for Italy, including two Embraer C-390 Millenniums, two Embraer 190s, and two Airbus A330s. The FAB said that they, "in coordination with the ministries of defence and foreign affairs, was called to repatriate Brazilians who are in Israel". Polish president Andrzej Duda said that "We are sending air force transport planes to carry out the evacuation of Poles currently staying in Israel," and that "We are working so that all our compatriots can return home safely."

Greece's Ministry of Foreign Affairs announced that it is in contact with Greek citizens in Israel, and announcing that 149 nationals had registered for the evacuation, and in the evening, 81 of them took the first plane to Athens.

Albania's Foreign Ministry announced that it had brought back 40 Albanians from Israel. Among the evacuated were two Kosovans, one who was the daughter of Kosovan interior minister Xhelal Sveçla, in addition to Macedonian citizens. The foreign ministry stated that "in the following days, there will be more special flights to Tel Aviv, while the Foreign Ministry is coordinating with the sister ministries of countries of the region to come to the aid of all citizens who want to return to their countries."

A Bulgarian governmental plane carrying 92 Bulgarians and one Croatian, mainly tourists, but also a group of dentists from a conference, departed from Tel Aviv. Because it was designated as diplomatic, it received authorization from the Israeli authorities. While transport minister Georgi Gvozdeykov praised Bulgaria for being the first countries to evacuate its citizens, the vice prime minister Mariya Gabriel stated that the evacuation of diplomats and their families had not been expected to be transferred yet.

Romania's Foreign Ministry said that 115 Romanians have been evacuated, after it stated that 346 citizens and foreign ones were evacuated from Saturday night to Sunday with two flights from TAROM. Around 900 Romanians were in Israel.

Bosnian ambassador Duško Kovačević confirmed the evacuation of one national with the help of the Serbian embassy.

==== 9 October ====
The Polish defence minister confirmed the evacuation, stating that Warsaw launched an "evacuation bridge" that will transport Polish citizens from Israel to the island of Crete before proceeding home. As of 13:00 UTC, the ministry confirmed three flights that reached Warsaw, with a fourth one en-route. According to Cirium data, the country has five Lockheed C-130 Hercules aircraft.

Swiss International Air Lines said that it would operate a special round-ribbon flight from Zürich to Tel-Aviv on 10 October, using a 219-seat Airbus A321; however, the airline stated it would not operate any flights to and from Israel through 14 October.

About 120 Icelanders were evacuated via Jordan after their trip was disrupted by the war. They were supposed to take an Icelandair plane provided by the government in Tel Aviv, however, due to security measures, the airline declined to fly to Israel. As a result, the tourists went to Amman where they took the plane at 21:20 Jordan Daylight Time (18:20 UTC).

==== 10 October ====
Argentina began evacuating 1,246 citizens from Israel. Defense minister Jorge Taiana stated that three aircraft are sent per day to evacuate the citizens to Rome, Italy; after which the state-owned Aerolineas Argentinas will fly them back home. Later, foreign minister Santiago Cafiero posted on X that the first of several flights have arrived to Rome.

Swiss International Air Lines had evacuated 220 Swiss nationals, with other planes, both having a capacity of 215 seats, expected to arrive on 11 and 12 October.

French foreign minister Catherine Colonna and the French embassy announced that Colonna's military's crisis unit was organizing a special Air France flight to Paris on 12 October to help evacuate French nationals who were unable to leave. The flight was stated to be for the "vulnerable" such as the pregnant, unaccompanied minors, and those in need of medical assistance.

Germany's Foreign Office announced that the country would evacuate its citizens on 12 and 13 October, with Lufthansa operating special flights from Israel. Those on Germany's "ELEFAND" list would be informed on 12 October about the ways to book tickets for those special flights.

Greece's Foreign Affairs announced that 90 more citizens have been evacuated from Israel through El Al airline, with the next plane arranged for the next day.

The Russian Foreign Ministry spokesperson Maria Zakharova stated that plans for evacuation of Russian citizens from the Palestinian territories was underway, and that there are still more commercial flights available for those in Israel.

The Brazilian Foreign Ministry stated in an X (formerly known as Twitter) post that evacuations of its citizens began. In another X post, Panama's Foreign Ministry stated that they are coordinating the evacuation of citizens in Israel.

Czech foreign minister Jan Lipavský travelled to Israel to meet President Isaac Herzog, this visit made him the first foreign politician to travel to Israel since the war has begun. That same day, on an X post, Lipavský wrote that he took a plane carrying Czech citizens repatriated from Israel.

==== 11 October ====
On 11 October, the Colombian Aerospace Force sent two C-40 Boeing 737 aircraft to evacuate a group of Colombian citizens from Israel. 110 Colombians were evacuated in the first aircraft.

Finland's foreign minister Elina Valtonen told reporters that Finland would evacuate its citizens from Israel and Palestine in the following days, and cited more than 170 Finns who need support in the crisis area for travel arrangements.

The Danish government said that it would evacuate its citizens as well as holders of permanent residency in the country from Israel and Palestine. It was believed that 1,290 Danes are in those affected regions.

Portugal had repatriated 152 nationals, in addition to 14 other Europeans. Another plane would evacuate others from Israel on 12 October, according to Reuters.

192 South Koreans safely landed at Incheon International Airport early in the morning from Tel Aviv. The foreign minister stated that another 30 would be evacuated by commercial flights, and a further 30, who were in a Christian pilgrimage, would leave by Jordan.

Norway had organized a flight due to depart in the evening for its citizens in Israel and the Palestinian territories, and the number of Norwegians in Israel was at 500.

The Lagos state governor Babajide Sanwo-Olu announced on X that Nigeria had repatriated 310 Christian pilgrims who went to Jordan. The pilgrims were travelling from Bethlehem to Nazareth when they noticed the attack, and "were scared and everyone wanted to return to Nigeria, no one wants to die."

The Australian Government announced at least two Qantas flights to Tel Aviv, although the airline does not fly there ordinarily. Although the flights are due to start on 13 October, the details of the flights had not been finalized yet. The prime minister Anthony Albanese stated that the flights were necessary because "many Australians are experiencing difficulties with delays and cancellations with commercial flights". Foreign minister Penny Wong stated that extra repatriation flights could be organised other than the two flights. Wong also urged citizens on 10 October not to wait for government-packed flights when commercial flights are available. Guardian Australia reported that the government asked Qantas and Virgin Australia for help repatriate Australians from the country.

Foreign minister Annalena Baerbock of Germany stated in the Bundestag that all students had managed to leave Israel. In an interview with a ZDF presenter, who asked for a reason on Germany not using military aircraft, Baerbock told that "given the situation that we have to get many, many more people out, we can't send a military plane, so we first took care of children and young people who were there without parents".

Fiji's defense minister Pio Tikoduadua announced that a Fiji Airways plane carrying almost 200 Fijians, in addition to 13 Australians, 16 New Zealanders, 8 Samoans, as well as citizens from Canada, the Philippines, and the United States, had departed from Tel Aviv and would arrive to Nadi on 12 October.

The Spanish Defense Ministry posted on X that a plane carrying around 200 Spanish and European Union citizens arrived in Spain. Later, the Spanish foreign minister José Manuel Albares posted that another plane was enroute.

The Swedish Civil Contingencies Agency stated that the Swedish government began evacuating Swedes from Israel.

The Mexican Foreign Ministry said that two planes carrying citizens flew from Israel to Shannon, Ireland en route to Mexico.

The Chilean Foreign Ministry announced that the first flight carrying Chilean citizens had departed, and that later the second flight had departed that day.

Thai Foreign Ministry spokesperson Kanchana Patarachoke told reporters that evacuation flights will depart on 12, 15, and 16 October.

==== 12 October ====
New Zealand foreign minister Nanaia Mahuta announced a partnership of the government with Etihad Airways to facilitate its citizens and others eligible for evacuation from other Pacific countries out of Tel Aviv.

The White House announced that the US government would begin organizing evacuation flights, expected to start the next day, to help Americans leave Israel. People familiar with the planning stated that the government was arranging four flights per day.

Canada evacuated its citizens from Tel Aviv to Athens, Greece through two Royal Canadian Air Force planes, after the government had implemented the plan to evacuate the citizens. From Athens, an Air Canada plane would arrive on 13 October, taking the evacuated to Toronto. Officials stated they were exploring other means of evacuation from Israel, including ground travel to Jordan.

The first batch of Thai workers evacuated Israel and arrived in Bangkok.

The Foreign Office of the United Kingdom arranged flights for Britions stranded in Israel, with the first plane leaving Tel Aviv that same day. The Office stated that there would be more planes "subject to security". It also stated that the flights would rather be commercial; passengers would pay £300 for a trip back to the country. The decision was a U-turn from the government of the country after it said before that the United Kingdom will not arrange evacuations due to available commercial flights.

The German Foreign Office organized another exit option which is via a ferry from Israel to Cyprus, with more being organized in a few days.

Nepal through Nepal Airlines began the repatriation process for its citizens.

==== 13 October ====
Cook Islands prime minister Mark Brown said that Australia was offering help to repatriate the island's citizens from Israel. He told Cook Islands News that the government was in touch with the remaining residents and hoping that they would be out of the country that day. He added that Cook Islands will look for work with Australia if the resident could not leave Israel.

Fiji's Prime Minister Sitiveni Rabuka celebrated the Fijians who were repatriated from Israel, who were 255 people.

The Greek Foreign Affairs announced the completion of its evacuation of a total of 230 Greek nationals from Israel through three phases on 9, 10, and 12 October. It also added that the return of citizens from 11 countries (including Israel) were ensured.

==== 14 October ====
The government of Uruguay dispatched a Uruguayan Air Force C-130 Hercules on 14 October to evacuate 90 Uruguayans from Israel. The air force plane left Tel Aviv with the evacuees and transported them to Madrid for connecting flights. With 22,000 Uruguayan citizens living in Israel, the government said another evacuation flight may be arranged in the future as more Uruguayans have requested assistance leaving the country.

The Tongan Government evacuated 61 people on a flight to London, 30 of whom were Tongan nationals and the rest citizens of New Zealand, Australia and Fiji. Most were part of a group of pilgrims who were in Jerusalem. Once they arrived at Stansted Airport, Prime Minister Siaosi Sovaleni celebrated the evacuation.

==== 16 October ====
By 16 October, 55 New Zealand nationals had been evacuated through mercy flights organised by the New Zealand Ministry of Foreign Affairs and Trade and Etihad Airlines. Evacuees were flown to Abu Dhabi, where they were expected to make their own travel arrangements home. 70 New Zealanders remained behind, with 50 in Israel and 20 in the Palestinian Territories.

==== 19 October ====
Evacuations of Israeli's marked as "at risk" populations were started in the city of Ashkelon with about 24,000 people identified as needing to be evacuated. The evacuated residents were to be housed in hotel rooms, that were to be paid for by an allotment of 160 million shekels by the Israeli government.

=== November 2023 ===
==== 1 November ====
On 1 November, 33 Brazilians were evacuated from the West Bank through Jordan.

==== 12 November ====
On November 10, Brazilians were authorized to leave Gaza, but the border remained closed. On November 12, all of the 32 Brazilians who requested to be evacuated were able to leave Gaza through Egypt. They were transported on the presidential aircraft VC-2. Upon their arrival in Brasília on the night of November 13, they were welcomed by president Lula. During this reception, the president condemned Israel's response as inhumane.

=== March 2024 ===
==== 15 March ====
It was reported that about 250,000 Israeli citizens were displaced due to the war, with about 164,000 being instructed or recommended to evacuate with government compensation, and between 100,000 and 150,000 evacuated without being asked to. Many were housed in hotels across Israel.

== Indian citizens ==
Operation Ajay (lit. "Unconquered" in Sanskrit) is an operation by the Indian Armed Forces to evacuate Indian citizens from Israel during the Gaza war. At the time the war began, an estimated 18,000 Indians were living in the affected areas.

Operations:

- The first charter flight carrying Indian citizens from Israel left Ben Gurion Airport late on 13 October 2023 with 211 adults and an infant.
- On October 14, the second flight carrying 235 Indians, including two infants, were brought home safely from Israel.
- On October 15, the third flight carrying 197 Indian citizens reached India.
- On October 15, the fourth flight carrying 274 Indian citizens reached the Indira Gandhi International Airport in Delhi from Israel's Ben Gurion airport.
- On October 17, the fifth flight carrying 286 passengers including 18 Nepalese citizens was safely flown from Israel.
- On October 22, sixth flight carrying 143 passengers including two Nepalese citizens were flew out of Israel.

== See also ==
- Outline of the Gaza war
- Gaza Strip evacuations – State-ordered displacement
- Ukrainian refugee crisis (2022–present) – Ongoing refugee crisis in Europe
- Displacement of Israelis after the October 7 attacks
