= Guadalupe Tagliaferri =

Argentine politician

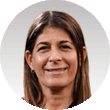

Legislator of the City of Buenos Aires
- Incumbent
- Assumed office 10 December 2025

National Senator
- In office 10 December 2019 – 10 December 2025
- Constituency: City of Buenos Aires

Minister of Human Development and Habitat of Buenos Aires
- In office 10 December 2015 – 10 December 2019
- Mayor: Horacio Rodríguez Larreta
- Preceded by: Carolina Stanley
- Succeeded by: María Migliore

Personal details
- Born: 26 June 1974 (age 52) Buenos Aires, Argentina
- Party: Republican Proposal
- Other political affiliations: Juntos por el Cambio (2015–2023)
- Education: University of Buenos Aires

Guadalupe Tagliaferri (born 26 June 1974) is an Argentine politician. She currently serves as a member of the Buenos Aires City Legislature. She previously served as a National Senator for the Autonomous City of Buenos Aires from 2019 to 2025, and as Minister of Human Development of Buenos Aires in the administration of Chief of Government Horacio Rodríguez Larreta from 2015 to 2019. She belongs to the Republican Proposal (PRO) party.

== Early life and education ==
Guadalupe Tagliaferri was born on 26 June 1974 in Buenos Aires. She studied political science at the University of Buenos Aires Faculty of Social Sciences, and has a master's degree in political administration.

== Political career ==
Tagliaferri's involvement in politics began in Grupo Sophia, a think tank founded by Horacio Rodríguez Larreta. In 2009, she was appointed General Director for Women in the Buenos Aires City Government; she would later be appointed as Undersecretary of Social Promotion and, in 2013, she was appointed to preside the city's Council of Children and Adolescents' Rights.

In 2015, upon Rodríguez Larreta's election as Chief of Government (mayor) of Buenos Aires, Tagliaferri was appointed as Minister of Human Development and Habitat, succeeding Carolina Stanley, who was appointed Minister of Social Development of Argentina. As minister, Tagliaferri oversaw the demolition of the Elefante Blanco, an abandoned hospital in the city's Villa Lugano barrio, and its replacement with a new building for the Ministry of Human Development.

=== National Senator ===
Ahead of the 2019 legislative election, Tagliaferri was internally selected to be the second candidate in the Juntos por el Cambio list to the Argentine Senate, after Martín Lousteau. The list received 53.99% of the votes and Tagliaferri was comfortably elected alongside Lousteau. She was sworn in on 27 November 2019.

Tagliaferri is one of the Senate's supporters of the Voluntary Interruption of Pregnancy Bill brought forward by President Alberto Fernández in 2020.

== Electoral history ==
Electoral history of Guadalupe Tagliaferri
Election	Office	List	#	District	Votes			Result	Ref.
Election	Office	List	#	District	Total	%	P.	Result	Ref.
2003	City Legislator	Commitment to Change	25	City of Buenos Aires	179,730	10.35%	4th (Note: Presented on an electoral list. The data shown represents the share of the vote the entire party/alliance received in that constituency.)	Not elected	
2019	National Senator	Juntos por el Cambio	2	City of Buenos Aires	1,076,452	53.99%	1st	Elected	
2025	City Legislator	Let's Come Back Buenos Aires	2	City of Buenos Aires	132,788	8.08%	4th	Elected	
