= Victoria Morales Gorleri =

Argentine politician

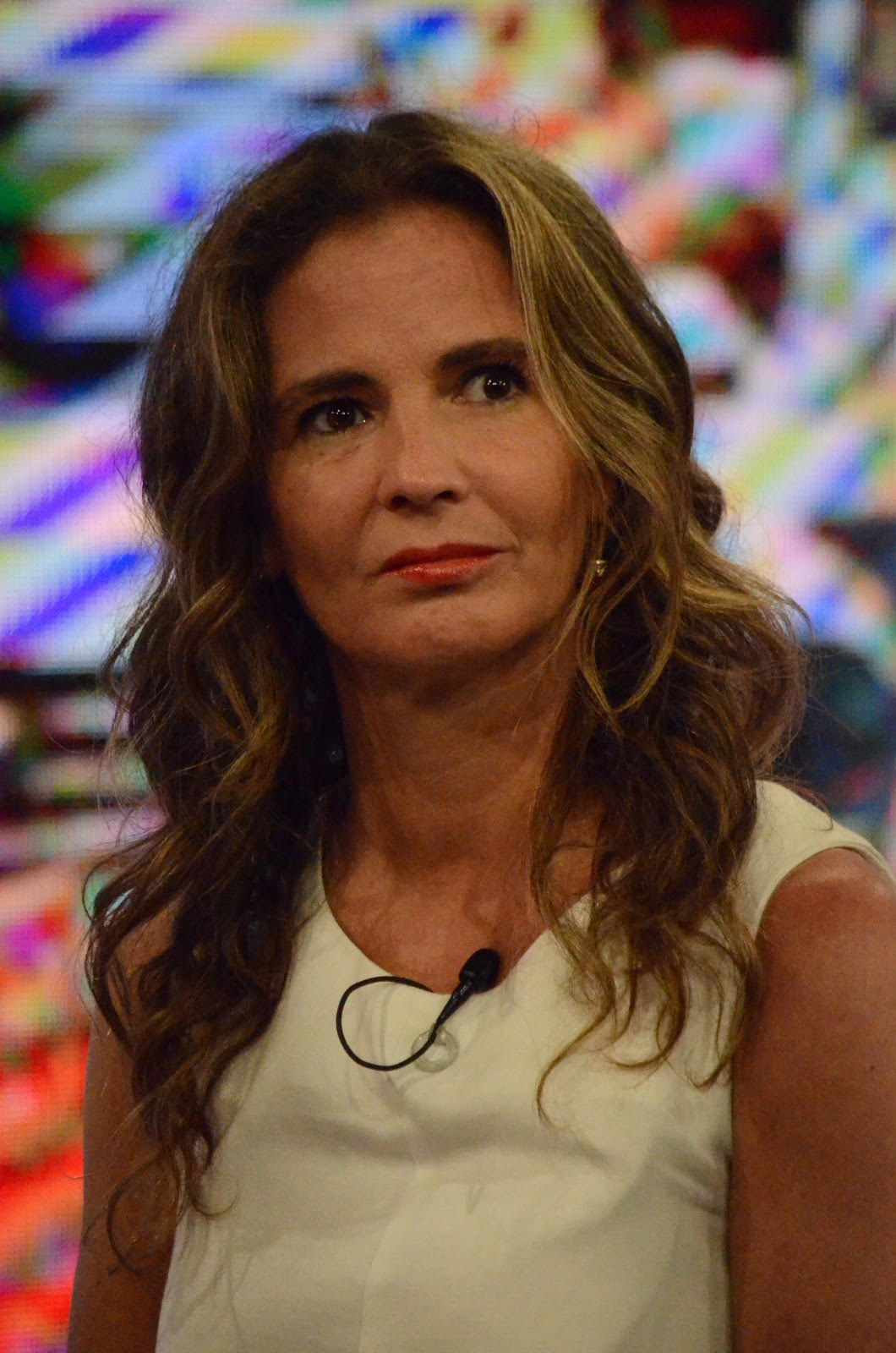

National Deputy
- Incumbent
- Assumed office 10 December 2019
- Constituency: City of Buenos Aires

Legislator of the City of Buenos Aires
- In office 10 December 2007 – 10 December 2015

Personal details
- Born: 1 March 1972 (age 54) Buenos Aires, Argentina
- Party: Republican Proposal
- Other political affiliations: Juntos por el Cambio (2015–present)

Victoria Morales Gorleri (born 1 March 1972) is an Argentine special education teacher and politician, currently serving as National Deputy elected in the City of Buenos Aires. A member of Republican Proposal, Morales Gorleri was first elected in 2019 and sits in the Juntos por el Cambio parliamentary inter-bloc.

Morales Gorleri previously served as a member of the Buenos Aires City Legislature from 2007 to 2015, and as Undersecretary of Social Responsibility for Sustainable Development in the Ministry of Social Development from 2015 to 2019, in the administration of minister Carolina Stanley.

== Early life and career ==
Morales Gorleri was born on 1 March 1972 in Buenos Aires. She studied to become a special education teacher at the Instituto Nacional Superior del Profesorado en Educación Especial, graduating in 1995. She is married and has five children.

From 1997 to 2007, Morales Gorleri coordinated youth social programmes at the Episcopal Vicarate for Education of the Roman Catholic Archdiocese of Buenos Aires. She co-founded the Escuela de Vecinos, which, according to Morales Gorleri, was the origin of Scholas Occurrentes, a worldwide network of schools under the patronage of the Roman Catholic Church. It was during her time working in the Archdiocese that she met Jorge Mario Bergoglio, future Pope Francis.

== Political career ==
Morales Gorleri was elected to the Buenos Aires City Legislature in the 2007 local election as part of the Republican Proposal list; she was the 9th candidate in the list. She was re-elected in 2011 as the 11th candidate in the Republican Proposal list. In 2015, upon the election of Mauricio Macri to the presidency of Argentina and the appointment of Carolina Stanley as Minister of Social Development, Morales Gorleri was appointed Undersecretary-Coordinator of Social Responsibility for Sustainable Development.

Morales Gorleri ran for a seat in the Chamber of Deputies in the 2019 legislative election; she was the second candidate in the Juntos por el Cambio list in Buenos Aires, behind Maximiliano Ferraro. The list was the most voted, with 52.86% of the votes, and Morales Gorleri was elected.

As a national deputy, Morales Gorleri formed part of the parliamentary commissions on Disabilities, Addiction Prevention, Families and Childhood, Prevision and Social Security, General Legislation, and Education (in which she was appointed vice-president). She was a vocal opponent of the legalization of abortion in Argentina, and voted against the 2020 Voluntary Interruption of Pregnancy bill that passed the Argentine Congress.
