= Juan Zabaleta =

Argentine politician (born 1967)

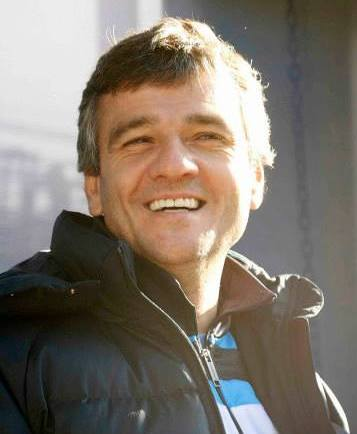

Mayor of Hurlingham
- In office 14 October 2022 – 8 December 2023
- Preceded by: Damián Selci
- Succeeded by: Damian Selci
- In office 10 December 2015 – 5 August 2021
- Preceded by: Luis Emilio Acuña
- Succeeded by: Damián Selci

Minister of Social Development
- In office 10 August 2021 – 13 October 2022
- President: Alberto Fernández
- Preceded by: Daniel Arroyo
- Succeeded by: Victoria Tolosa Paz

Personal details
- Born: 29 April 1967 (age 59) Haedo, Argentina
- Party: Justicialist Party
- Other political affiliations: Front for Victory (2003–2017); Unidad Ciudadana (2017–2019); Frente de Todos (2019–present)

Juan Horacio "Juanchi" Zabaleta (Spanish pronunciation: [ˈxwan oˈɾasjo saβaˈleta]; born 29 April 1967) is an Argentine politician and retired racing driver, currently serving as intendente (mayor) of Hurlingham, a partido in the Greater Buenos Aires metropolitan area. He was first elected in 2015 and re-elected in 2019. From 2021 to 2022, he was the country's Minister of Social Development in the cabinet of President Alberto Fernández.

== Early life ==
Zabaleta was born on 29 April 1967 in Haedo, a suburb in the Greater Buenos Aires conurbation. In his youth, he was a co-pilot for racing driver Luis "Patita" Minervino in Turismo Carretera. Zabaleta and Minervino won thirteen races and were runners-up in 1995 and 1996 for Chevrolet. In 2012, now as a mechanical technician, Zabaleta successfully lobbied for the state purchase of Turismo Carretera and the public transmission of races during the government of Cristina Fernández de Kirchner.

== Political career ==
Zabaleta began his political activism in the Justicialist Party. He was director of union affairs in the National Social Security Administration (ANSES) from 2004 to 2007, and administrative manager in the General Secretariat of ANSES starting in 2007. He also served as Administrative Director of the Argentine Senate under Amado Boudou. From 2009 to 2011 he was Undersecretary of Institutional Affairs at the Ministry of Economy.

In 2015, Zabaleta ran for the mayoralty of Hurlingham as part of the Front for Victory; he won with 38% of the vote. He took office on 12 December 2015, succeeding Luis Acuña. He was re-elected for a second term in 2019 with over 54% of the vote, as part of the Frente de Todos coalition.

=== Ministry of Social Development ===
On 9 August 2021, Cabinet Chief Santiago Cafiero confirmed Zabaleta would be the next Minister of Social Development of Argentina, in replacement of Daniel Arroyo, who resigned to focus on his campaign to the Argentine Chamber of Deputies in the 2021 legislative election. Zabaleta was one of two ministerial replacements ahead of the 2021 election, alongside Jorge Taiana, who replaced Agustín Rossi as Minister of Defense.

In October 2022, he resigned from the position, citing his wish to return to Hurlingham as mayor. Having taken a leave of absence, he returned to the mayorship. He was succeeded as minister by Victoria Tolosa Paz.

== Personal life ==
Zabaleta lives in Hurlingham and is married to Carolina Olzagasti. He has six children.

Political offices
Preceded by Luis Emilio Acuña	Mayor of Hurlingham; 2015–2021	Succeeded by Damián Selci
Preceded by Daniel Arroyo	Minister of Social Development; 2021–2022	Succeeded by Victoria Tolosa Paz
Preceded by Damián Selci	Mayor of Hurlingham; 2022–2023	Succeeded by Damian Selci
