= Daniel Arroyo =

Argentine politician

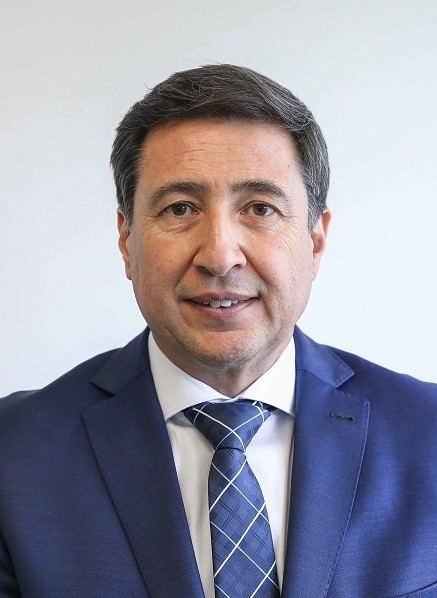

National Deputy
- Incumbent
- Assumed office 10 December 2021
- Constituency: Buenos Aires
- In office 10 December 2017 – 10 December 2019
- Constituency: Buenos Aires

Minister of Social Development
- In office 10 December 2019 – 10 August 2021
- President: Alberto Fernández
- Preceded by: Carolina Stanley
- Succeeded by: Juan Zabaleta

Minister of Social Development of Buenos Aires Province
- In office 10 December 2007 – 3 August 2009
- Governor: Daniel Scioli
- Preceded by: Jorge Rubén Varela
- Succeeded by: Baldomero Álvarez de Olivera

Secretary of Social Policy and Human Development
- In office 8 October 2004 – 10 December 2007
- President: Néstor Kirchner
- Preceded by: Office created
- Succeeded by: María Cecilia Velázquez

Personal details
- Born: 6 October 1966 (age 60) Castelar, Buenos Aires Province, Argentina
- Party: Justicialist Party; Renewal Front (2013–present)
- Other political affiliations: United for a New Alternative (2015–2017); Frente de Todos (2019–present)
- Education: University of Buenos Aires; Latin American Faculty of Social Sciences

Daniel Fernando Arroyo (Spanish pronunciation: [daˈnjel feɾˈnando aˈroʝo]; born 6 October 1966) is an Argentine political scientist, professor and politician. He was the country's Minister of Social Development, in the cabinet of President Alberto Fernández, from 2019 to 2021. Since 2021, he has been a National Deputy elected in Buenos Aires Province, a position he previously held from 2017 to 2019.

A member of the Justicialist Party affiliated with the Renewal Front, Arroyo served as Minister of Social Development of Buenos Aires Province in the cabinet of Governor Daniel Scioli. In addition, he has taught courses at a number of Argentine universities, including the Torcuato di Tella University, the National University of Cuyo, and the Latin American Faculty of Social Sciences.

== Early life and education ==
Daniel Fernando Arroyo was born on 6 October 1966 in Castelar, Buenos Aires Province. He studied political science at the University of Buenos Aires Faculty of Social Sciences, where he received his licenciatura in 1990; he then went on to receive a post-graduate degree on control and administration of public policy from the Latin American Faculty of Social Sciences (FLACSO) in 1995.

He has taught graduate and post-graduate level courses at FLACSO, at the Torcuato di Tella University, at the National University of Cuyo and at the National University of Moreno, and was a visiting faculty at the University of Bologna in Italy and the University of Salamanca in Spain.

== Political career ==
In 2004 he was appointed as Secretary of Social Policy and Human Development and Deputy Minister of Social Development by President Néstor Kirchner, serving under the administration of Alicia Kirchner until 2007. From then he went on to serve as Minister of Social Development in the Buenos Aires Province provincial cabinet of Governor Daniel Scioli, who reportedly sought him for his technical expertise in the field. As provincial minister he sought to implement the "Plan Más Vida", wherein the government distributed welfare cards to be used in food and other essential goods. He left the position in 2009, and was replaced by Avellaneda mayor Baldomero Álvarez de Olivera.

From 2009 to 2017 he held a number of directive posts in the Banco Provincia, including the directorship from 2016 to 2017. He was also president of the corruption watchdog NGO Poder Ciudadano until 2013, when he stepped down to run for a seat in the Argentine Chamber of Deputies in the Renewal Front list. In 2015 he ran for the position of Vice Governor of Buenos Aires Province in the Renewal Front ticket, alongside Felipe Solá.

In 2017 he ran for a seat in the Chamber of Deputies once again, this time in the 1País list (of which the Renewal Front was part) and was elected; he was sworn in as National Deputy on 10 December 2017.

=== Minister of Social Development ===
On 6 December 2019, President-elect Alberto Fernández announced his intention of appointing Arroyo as Minister of Social Development of Argentina, succeeding Carolina Stanley; Arroyo had positioned himself as a staunch opponent of Stanley and the previous administration's welfare and social policies. He assumed office alongside the rest of Fernández's cabinet on 10 December 2019.

Ahead of the 2021 primary elections, Arroyo was confirmed the 12th candidate in the Frente de Todos list to the Chamber of Deputies in Buenos Aires Province. On 9 August 2021, Cabinet Chief Santiago Cafiero confirmed Juan Zabaleta would replace Arroyo as Minister of Social Development. Arroyo's was one of two ministerial replacements ahead of the 2021 election, alongside Agustín Rossi, who was replaced by Jorge Taiana as Minister of Defense.

== Personal life ==
Arroyo is married to Alejandra Folco and has two children, Lucía and Martín. On 25 September 2020 he confirmed he had tested positive for COVID-19, becoming the first minister of the national cabinet to get infected.

== Electoral history ==
Electoral history of Daniel Arroyo
Election	Office	List	#	District	Votes			Result	Ref.
Election	Office	List	#	District	Total	%	P.	Result	Ref.
2017	National Deputy	1País	3	Buenos Aires Province	1,028,385	11.03%	3rd (Note: Presented on an electoral list. The data shown represents the share of the vote the entire party/alliance received in that constituency.)	Elected	
2021	National Deputy	Frente de Todos	12	Buenos Aires Province	3,444,446	38.59%	2nd	Elected	

Political offices
Preceded by New post	Secretary of Social Policy and Human Development; 2004–2007	Succeeded by María Cecilia Velázquez
Preceded by Jorge Rubén Varela	Minister of Social Development of Buenos Aires Province; 2007–2009	Succeeded by Baldomero Álvarez de Olivera
Preceded by Dante Sica	Minister of Social Development; 2019–2021	Succeeded by Juan Zabaleta
