= Micaela Morán =

Argentine politician

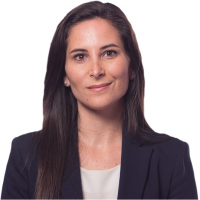

National Deputy
- Incumbent
- Assumed office 12 October 2022
- Constituency: Buenos Aires

Personal details
- Born: 26 March 1985 (age 41)
- Party: Renewal Front
- Other political affiliations: Frente de Todos (2019–2023); Union for the Homeland (since 2023)
- Occupation: Lawyer

Micaela Morán (born 26 March 1985) is an Argentine politician who is a member of the Chamber of Deputies of Argentina since 2022. She is a member of the Renewal Front.

== Biography ==
Morán worked as a lawyer before she was sworn into office in 2022, as a replacement for Victoria Tolosa Paz, who resigned to become Minister of Social Development.

== Electoral history ==
Electoral history of Micaela Morán
Election	Office	List	#	District	Votes			Result	Ref.
Election	Office	List	#	District	Total	%	P.	Result	Ref.
2015	Councillor	United for a New Alternative	2	Zárate Partido	10,067	14.57%	3rd (Note: Presented on an electoral list. The data shown represents the share of the vote the entire party/alliance received in that constituency.)	Elected	
2019	Councillor	Frente de Todos	4	Zárate Partido	44,173	59.97%	1st	Elected	
2021	National Deputy	Frente de Todos	17	Buenos Aires Province	3,444,446	38.59%	2nd	Not elected (Note: Assumed office following the resignation of Victoria Tolosa Paz.)	
