= Jorge Taiana =

Argentine politician

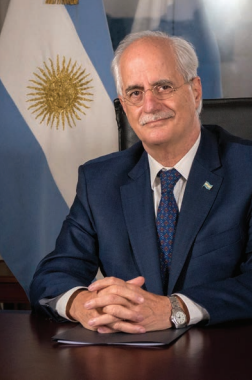
- Official portrait, 2023

Minister of Defense
- In office 10 August 2021 – 10 December 2023
- President: Alberto Fernández
- Preceded by: Agustín Rossi
- Succeeded by: Luis Petri

National Senator
- In office 10 December 2019 – 9 August 2021
- Preceded by: Cristina Fernández de Kirchner
- Succeeded by: Juliana Di Tullio
- Constituency: Buenos Aires

Legislator of the City of Buenos Aires
- In office 10 December 2013 – 10 December 2015

Minister of Foreign Affairs and Worship
- In office 1 December 2005 – 18 June 2010
- President: Néstor Kirchner; Cristina Fernández de Kirchner
- Preceded by: Rafael Bielsa
- Succeeded by: Héctor Timerman

Personal details
- Born: 31 May 1950 (age 76) Buenos Aires, Argentina
- Party: Justicialist Party
- Other political affiliations: Front for Victory (2003–2017); Unidad Ciudadana (2017–2019); Frente de Todos (2019–present)
- Education: Latin American Faculty of Social Sciences

Jorge Enrique Taiana (Spanish pronunciation: [ˈxoɾ.xe enˈri.ke taˈja.na]; born 31 May 1950) is an Argentine Justicialist Party politician who served as the country's Minister of Defense from 2021 to 2023. Taiana previously served as Foreign Minister in the administrations of President Néstor Kirchner and his successor, Cristina Fernández de Kirchner, from 2005 to 2010, and as a National Senator for Buenos Aires from 2019 to 2021.

His father was Jorge Alberto Taiana, colleague and physician of former President Juan Perón.

As of 2025, he is leading the Unión por la Patria in Buenos Aires Province list as a candidate for the Chamber of Deputies.

== Early life ==
Jorge Taiana was born in Buenos Aires as the fourth and second youngest child of Matilde Puebla and Jorge Alberto Taiana. His father was a prominent Argentine surgeon who later served in a number of social policy posts for President Juan Perón, as well as one of his personal physicians. He attended the Colegio Nacional de Buenos Aires, studied sociology, and was awarded a Master's Degree in Social Sciences at the Latin American Social Science Institute (FLACSO). He was later a researcher at the National University of Quilmes and worked in the field of human rights. Taiana is married to Telefe producer Bernarda Llorente; he has three children, two by a previous marriage.

Taiana was a militant Peronist in the early 1970s and in 1973 re-launched Descamisado, a populist news weekly thereafter associated with the Montoneros guerilla movement. He worked alongside his father in the Ministry of Education as Head of Cabinet following the return of Peronism to power in 1973, and despite being threatened by the Triple A, he decided to remain in the country. He was falsely accused to be responsible for a bomb attack on July 4, 1975 which killed two people in a bar in downtown Buenos Aires. In fact, he had been arrested on June 29 and spent seven years in jail, mostly in a military prison in Rawson.

== Political career ==
Following his release, Taiana held several academic positions until he was appointed Advisor to the Foreign Affairs Committee of the Argentine Chamber of Deputies (1987–89). He was appointed Undersecretary for Organizations and Special Matters after the election of fellow Peronist Carlos Menem in 1989, and in 1990 was appointed Undersecretary for Foreign Policy and later Director of International Organizations (1991). Between 1992 and 1995, he was the Argentine Ambassador to Guatemala and concurrently to Belize. After wide regional support to his candidature, he served as Executive Secretary of the Inter-American Commission on Human Rights of the OAS between 1996 and 2001, and then became Secretary for Human Rights of the Government of the Province of Buenos Aires.

President Kirchner appointed Taiana as Minister of Foreign Affairs, International Trade and Worship in December 2005, replacing Rafael Bielsa; Taiana had been Bielsa's Deputy since 2003. As Foreign Minister, Taiana has presided over the United Nations Security Council and to dealt with issues such as the Falkland Islands sovereignty dispute, the paper mill dispute with Uruguay and the accession of Venezuela to Mercosur, among many other matters of Argentine foreign policy. He was confirmed as Foreign Minister by Cristina Fernández de Kirchner on her inaugural on 10 December 2007. During his time as foreign minister, a parallel embassy was established in Venezuela under the leadership of Claudio Uberti, who developed businesses with money that later financed the Kirchners' political campaigns. The affair became public knowledge when Antonini Wilson entered the country with suitcases containing $800,000.

He resigned his post on 18 June 2010, citing "lack of support and differences" with the President. He remained generally supportive of her administration, however, and in September was nominated to head the Front for Victory party list for the Buenos Aires City Legislature.

=== National Senator ===
In the 2017 legislative election, Fernández de Kirchner announced her candidacy to the Argentine Senate in Buenos Aires Province as part of Unidad Ciudadana, and Taiana was announced as the second candidate in the list. The Fernández de Kirchner–Taiana ticket came second in the general election, with 37.31% of the vote. In the electoral system for the upper house, this meant that only Fernández de Kirchner was elected as the senator for the minority. Following the 2019 general election, however, in which Fernández de Kirchner was elected vice president alongside Alberto Fernández, her seat in the Senate was left vacant, and Taiana was sworn into office in her stead on 27 November 2019.

=== Defense Minister ===
On 9 August 2021, Cabinet Chief Santiago Cafiero confirmed Taiana would be the next Minister of Defense of Argentina, in replacement of Agustín Rossi, who resigned to focus on his campaign to the Senate in the 2021 legislative election. Taiana was one of two ministerial replacements ahead of the 2021 election, alongside Juan Zabaleta, who replaced Daniel Arroyo as Minister of Social Development. His vacancy in the Senate was filled by Juliana Di Tullio.

=== Chamber of Deputies ===
In August 2025, Taiana was confirmed as a Unión por la Patria in Buenos Aires Province candidate for the Chamber of Deputies. He led the list that came together from an agreement among ex president Cristina Fernández de Kirchner, and current Buenos Aires province governor Axel Kicillof. In the October elections he came second to the government's candidate, Diego Santilli and the peronist coalition got only one seat representing the Buenos Aires province.

== Honours and awards ==
=== Foreign honours ===
- Peru: Grand Cross of the Order of the Sun of Peru (24 October 2003)
- Brazil: Grand Cross of the Order of Rio Branco (26 November 2003)
- Spain: Knight Grand Cross of the Order of Isabella the Catholic (6 February 2009)
- Chile: Grand Cross of the Order of Merit (9 February 2009)
- Armenia: Mkhitar Gosh Medal (31 March 2015)

== See also ==
- Ministry of Foreign Affairs, International Trade and Worship
- List of Foreign Ministers of Argentina
- Government of Argentina

Political offices
| Preceded by Rafael Bielsa | Minister of Foreign Affairs; 2005–2010 | Succeeded by Héctor Timerman |
| Preceded by Agustín Rossi | Minister of Defense; 2021–2023 | Succeeded by Luis Petri |
