= Faculty of Social Sciences, University of Buenos Aires =

Social sciences faculty of the University of Buenos Aires

Faculty of Social Sciences
- Facultad de Ciencias Sociales
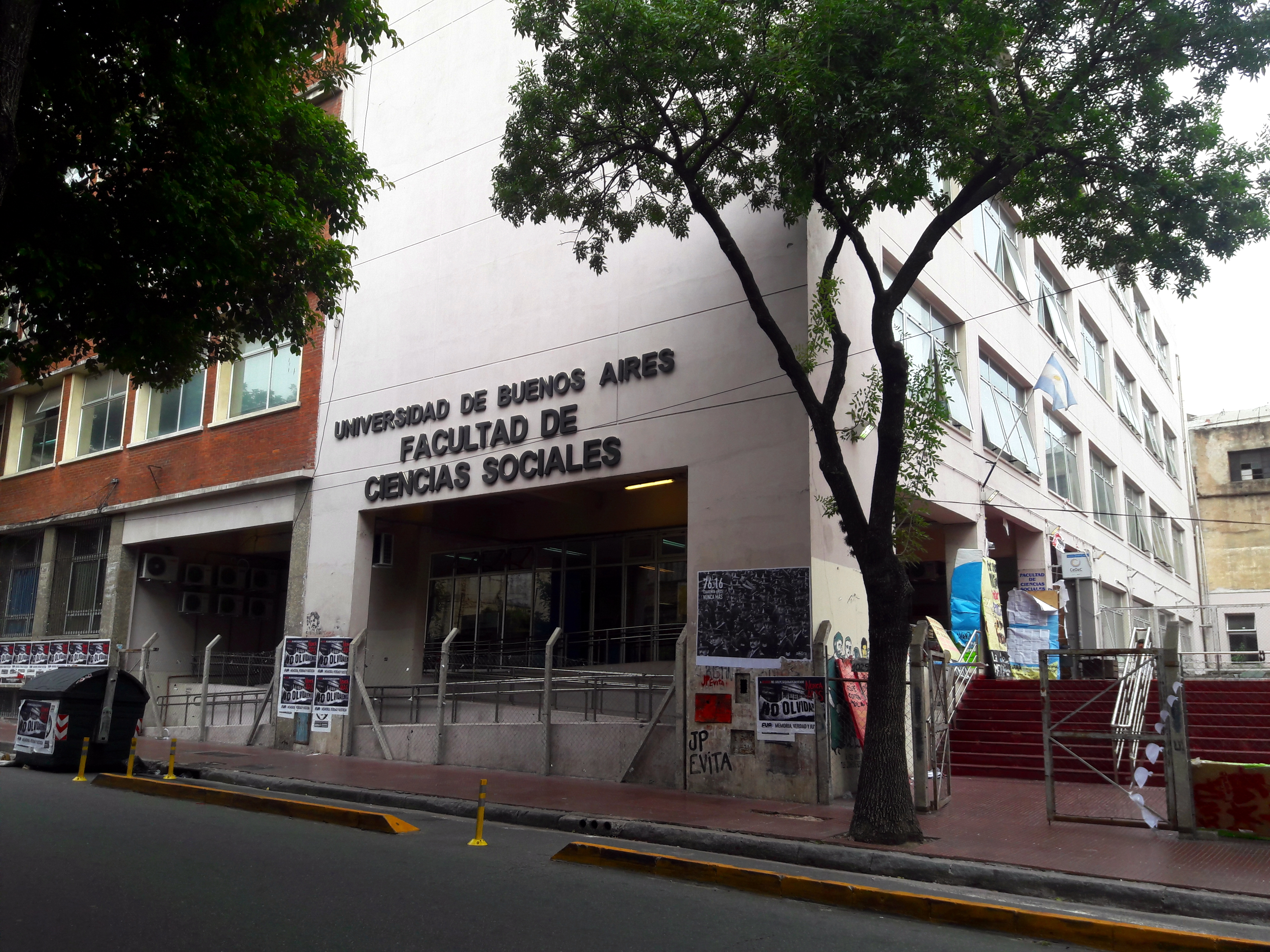
- FSoc seat at Santiago del Estero 1019, Constitución
- Type: Faculty
- Established: 1988; 38 years ago
- Affiliations: University of Buenos Aires
- Dean: Ana Josefina Arias
- Academic staff: 2,000
- Students: 25,000
- Postgraduates: 2,500
- Location: Buenos Aires, Argentina; 34.3714°S 58.2305°W
- Website: sociales.uba.ar
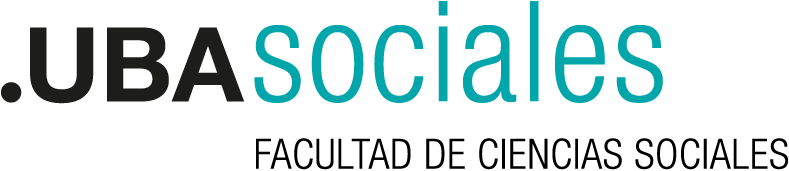

The Faculty of Social Sciences (Facultad de Ciencias Sociales; FSoc), commonly and informally known as Sociales, is the social sciences faculty of the University of Buenos Aires (UBA), the largest university in Argentina. It was founded in 1988, and offers degrees on social work, sociology, labor relations, communication and political science, in addition to a number of post-graduate degrees.

The Faculty also has with two research institutes: the Instituto de Investigaciones Gino Germani (IIGG) and the Instituto de Estudios de América Latina y el Caribe (IEALC), in addition to several research centers and observatories. Among the Faculty's regular publications are the Ciencias Sociales, Sociedad, and Sociales en Debate journals. As of 2011, it was the fifth-largest faculty in the university by number of students.

It is housed in two separate buildings, one located on Marcelo T. de Alvear street, in the Recoleta barrio, and another on Santiago del Estero street, in Constitución. Since 2011, most graduate courses are taught at the Santiago del Estero building.

== History ==
The Faculty of Social Sciences was founded on 25 August 1988, when the social sciences degrees at the University of Buenos Aires were split from other UBA faculties. The university already offered social work degrees since 1946, sociology degrees since 1957 (at the behest of Italian-born sociologist and researcher Gino Germani), and labor relations degrees since 1975. Following the last military dictatorship in Argentina (1976–1983), the arrival of political science (1985) and communication sciences (1986) degrees to the university led to the creation of a new faculty within UBA focused entirely on social sciences.

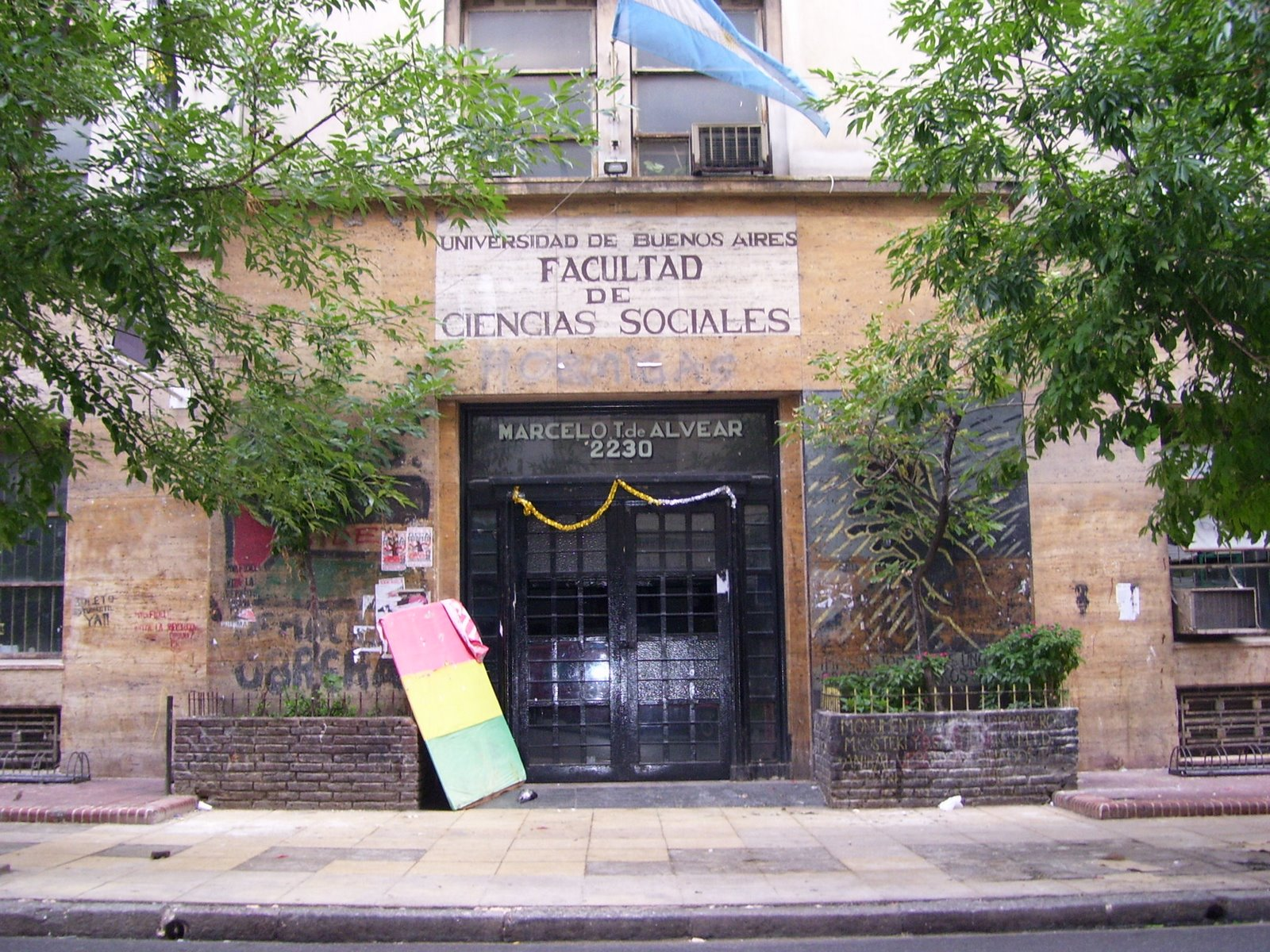
FSoc building at Marcelo T. de Alvear 2230.

During the early years of the FSoc's existence, there was no single building where all classes and research institutes could convene. Instead, different buildings owned by the university were assigned for the Faculty's activities. The rise in registered students in the 1990s made these existing facilities insufficient, and in 1997 students and professors staged a two-month strike, demanding a new, unified building for the Faculty. Eventually, UBA authorities bought a former textile factory building on Ramos Mejía 847 (near Parque Centenario), with capacity for 3,600 students, and granted it to the Faculty.

The Faculty's student body kept growing steadily into the 2000s, and by 2002 the Ramos Mejía building had been outgrown. A 43-day takeover of the UBA rector's offices by FSoc students led to an agreement to build new headquarters for FSoc. In co-operation with the Ministry of Education, the University bought the abandoned site of an old Terrabusi factory, which it set out to recondition as FSoc's new headquarters. The building, located on Santiago del Estero 1029 in the Constitución neighborhood, was inaugurated in 2011. It houses all graduate courses.

== Graduate and post-graduate programs ==
Graduate

- Licenciatura on Social Communication Sciences
- Licenciatura on Labor Relations
- Licenciatura on Political Science
- Licenciatura on Social Work
- Licenciatura on Sociology

Professorship

- Professorship of Middle and Superior Teaching on Social Communication Sciences
- Professorship of Middle and Superior Teaching on Political Science
- Professorship of Middle and Superior Teaching on Labor Relations
- Professorship of Middle and Superior Teaching on Social Work
- Professorship of Secondary, Normal and Special Teaching on Sociology

Postgraduate

- Magister degree on Labor Social Sciences
- Magister degree on Journalism
- Magister degree on Social Intervention
- Magister degree on Communication and Culture
- Magister degree on Social Policies
- Magister degree on Latin American Social Studies
- Magister degree on Political and Social Theory
- Magister degree on Social Sciences Research

In addition, the Faculty of Social Sciences offers a number of specialization degrees, as well as doctorates and post-doctoral degrees.

== Research institutes and dependencies ==
The Faculty of Social Sciences has two research institutes: the Instituto de Investigaciones Gino Germani (IIGG) and the Instituto de Estudios de América Latina y el Caribe (IEALC), in addition to several research centers and observatories. The IIGG has over 260 researchers, 220 grant-holders, and 150 research interns. Over 150 financed research projects are carried out by the IIGG, making it one of the largest and most relevant research institutes in Latin America. The Instituto de Estudios de América Latina y el Caribe (IEALC) centers its work on promoting, co-ordinating and developing a Latin American perspective on social studies pertaining to the region.

The Faculty also operates a specialized library with contents pertaining to social sciences. The library's collection includes over 53,000 volumes, including reference works (encyclopedias, dictionaries, indexes, databases), theses, and journals. Many of these works are digitalized and form part of the library's digital catalogue.

== Political and institutional life ==
Like the rest of the University of Buenos Aires's faculties, the Faculty of Social Sciences operates under the principle of tripartite co-governance, wherein authorities are democratically elected and professors, students and graduates are represented in the faculty's governing bodies. The faculty is headed by a Dean (Spanish: decana or decano), who presides over the Directive Council (Consejo Directivo). The Directive Council is made up of eight representatives for the professors, four representatives of the student body, and four representatives of the faculty's graduates. Deans are elected by the Directive Council every four years, while elections to the council take place every two years.

Administrative work is further carried out by appointed secretariats. Each of the graduate courses is also administered through democratically elected directors and Juntas de Carrera. Since 2022, the dean of the Faculty of Social Sciences has been Dr. Ana Josefina Arias.

== Notable people ==
Notable alumni of the Faculty of Social Sciences include former Cabinet Chiefs Juan Manuel Abal Medina and Santiago Cafiero, politicians Gladys González, Guadalupe Tagliaferri, Daniel Arroyo, Silvia Lospennato, and Laura Alonso (all licentiates in Political Science), as well as sociologists Alcira Argumedo, Horacio González, Hilda Herzer, Néstor Perlongher and Nathalia González Seligra.

Notable faculty at FSoc include Nobel Peace Prize laureate Adolfo Pérez Esquivel, Dora Barrancos, Juan Carlos Portantiero (who served as dean from 1990 to 1998), Atilio Borón, Tomás Várnagy, Pedro Brieger, Christian Castillo, Daniel Filmus, and Carla Carrizo.
