= Hilda Herzer =

Argentinian sociologist

Hilda María Herzer (1938, Buenos Aires - 25 August 2012) was an Argentine sociologist, environmentalist and professor. She was a researcher with FLACSO, and visiting professor at Universidad Nacional del Litoral.

She earned her bachelor's degree at the Faculty of Social Sciences, University of Buenos Aires in 1960, and her PhD in social sciences at New York University. Herzer was a pioneer in the field of urban studies in Argentina. Her fieldwork, conducted with her research group, focused on the city of Pergamino. She is remembered for her teaching and research at the Instituto de Investigaciones Gino Germani and for serving as director of the Research Institute of the Faculty of Social Sciences, University of Buenos Aires, 1989 and 1990. Throughout her career, she established a body of research and publications on environmental and urban issues. In early 2000s, she was the board chair and then honorary president of the environmental and human rights group Salus Terrae.

== Selected works ==
- 2012, Barrios al Sur – Renovación y pobreza en la Ciudad de Buenos Aires. 1ª ed. Editorial Café de las Ciudades. 412 pp. ISBN 978-987-25706-4-4
- 2011, La cuestión urbana interrogada: transformaciones urbanas, ambientales y políticas públicas en Argentina. 1ª ed. Buenos Aires: Café de las Ciudades, 556 pp. ISBN 978-987-25706-1-3 resumen en línea en línea
- 2010, Con el Corazón Mirando al Sur. Editorial Espacio. 368 pp. ISBN 9789508022912
- 2000, “Procesos Urbanos y Hábitat: El rol de los actores en la construcción y la gestión de la ciudad”. En: Cuaderno de la Maestría en Hábitat y Vivienda. Universidad Nacional de Rosario Editora. Rosario, Argentina
- 1997, Postales Urbanas Del Final Del Milenio: Una Construcción de Muchos. Vol. 8 de Colección Sociedad. Edición ilustrada de Univ. de Buenos Aires, Instituto de Investigaciones "Gino Germani," Facultad de Ciencias Sociales, 252 pp. ISBN 9502904281, ISBN 9789502904283
- 1996, Ciudad de Buenos Aires: gobierno y descentralización. Vol. 4 de Colección CEA-CBC. Editor Oficina de Publicaciones del C.B.C., Universidad de Buenos Aires, 309 pp. ISBN 9502902858, ISBN 9789502902852
- 1996, Ciudades en riesgo: degradación ambiental, riesgos urbanos y desastres en América Latina. Reference, Information and Interdisciplinary Subjects Series. Editor Soluciones Prácticas, 190 pp. ISBN 9972470016, ISBN 9789972470011 en línea
- 1994, Modelo teórico-conceptual para la gestión urbana en ciudades medianas de América Latina. Naciones Unidas. Comisión Económica para América Latina y el Caribe. Editor CEPAL, 50 pp.
- 1990, Construcción y Administración de la Ciudad Latinoamericana. Colección Estudios políticos y sociales. Con Nora Clichevsky. Edición ilustrada de IIED—América Latina, 526 pp. ISBN 9506940932, ISBN 9789506940935
- 1985, La inundación en el Gran Resistencia (provincia del Chaco, Argentina) 1982- 1983. Desastres naturales y Sociedad en América Latina. Buenos Aires. Grupo Editor Latinoamericano. CLACSO. Colección Estudios Políticos y Sociales. en línea
