= Marcos Peña =

Argentine politician

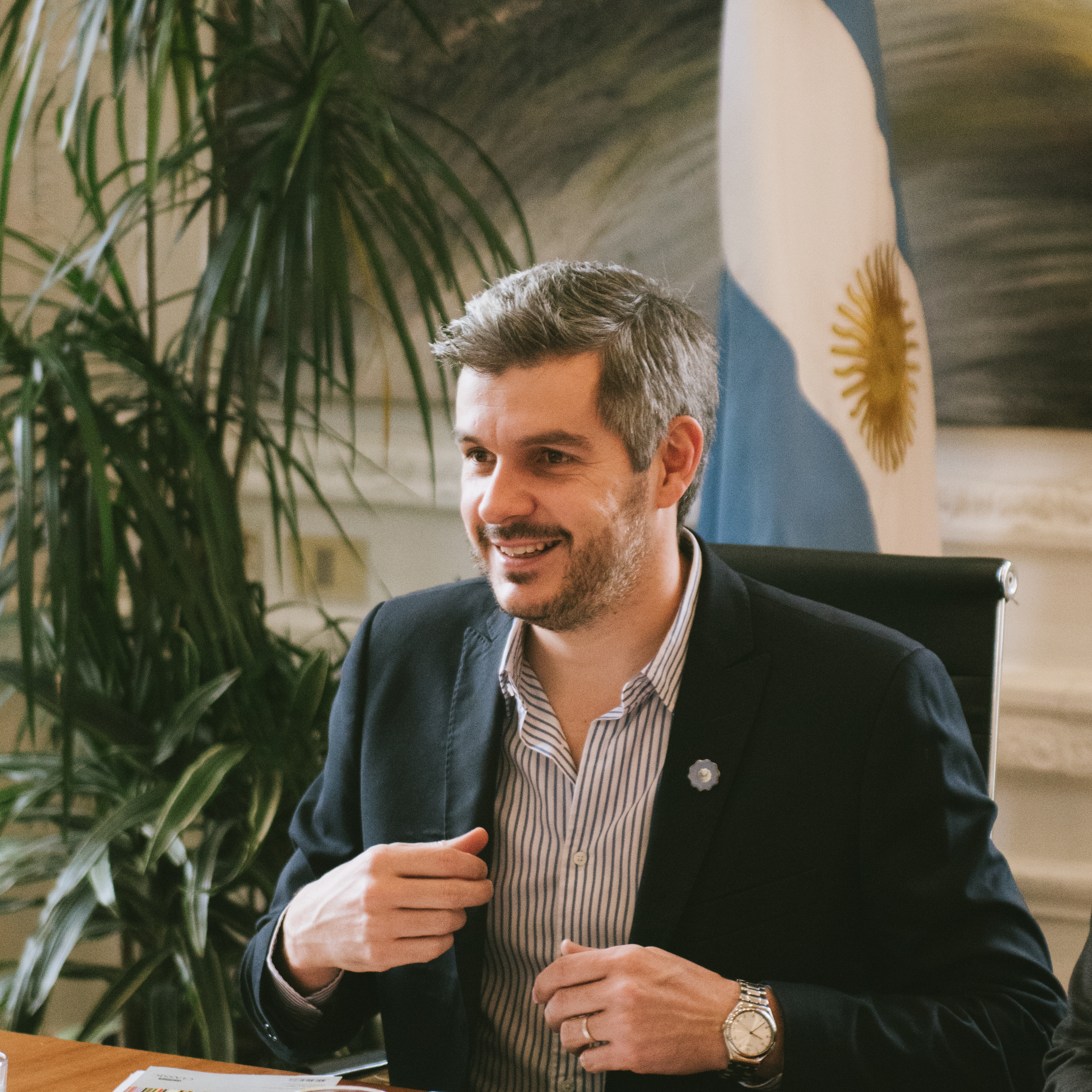

Chief of the Cabinet of Ministers
- In office 10 December 2015 – 10 December 2019
- President: Mauricio Macri
- Preceded by: Aníbal Fernández
- Succeeded by: Santiago Cafiero

Legislator of the City of Buenos Aires
- In office 10 December 2003 – 10 December 2007

Personal details
- Born: 15 March 1977 (age 49) Buenos Aires, Argentina
- Party: Republican Proposal (2005–present); Commitment to Change (2003–2005)
- Other political affiliations: Juntos por el Cambio (2015–present)
- Education: Torcuato di Tella University

Marcos Peña (born March 15, 1977) is an Argentine politician, author and political scientist who served as Chief of the Cabinet of Ministers during Mauricio Macri's presidency.

Previously, he was Legislator of the City of Buenos Aires by Commitment to Change. He is one of the most important members of Republican Proposal and led Mauricio Macri's presidential campaigns of 2015 and 2019.

== Early life and education ==
Marcos Peña was born on March 15, 1977, in Buenos Aires. Peña is the son of Félix Peña, a foreign trade specialist, and Clara Braun, an academic. He is the grandson of the Argentine physiologist, Eduardo Braun-Menéndez. He attended his first years of elementary school at Wayside Elementary School in Potomac, Maryland, United States, as his parents lived abroad. He returned to Argentina and completed high school in Buenos Aires. He graduated with a degree in political sciences from the Torcuato di Tella University.

== Political career ==
While studying political science, Peña volunteered in the presidential campaign of José Octavio Bordón (FREPASO) in 1995. He then worked ad honorem with his father in the Undersecretariat of Foreign Trade of the Carlos Menem government, where he met Gabriela Michetti.

In 2003 he helped the gestation of Commitment to Change, which would later be Republican Proposal, popularly known as PRO, a new party led by Mauricio Macri in the City of Buenos Aires. That year, he was elected a Legislator for the Buenos Aires City.

In 2005, Macri appointed Marcos Peña as the first chairman of PRO's youth wing.

== City of Buenos Aires ==
When Mauricio Macri became mayor of Buenos Aires in 2007, Peña was designated General Secretary of the City of Buenos Aires.

== Chief of Cabinet ==
He was appointed as chief of communication for the 2015 Mauricio Macri's campaign. He is considered one of the closest leaders to Mauricio Macri and one of the Cambiemos figures in the presidential campaign. In November 2015, after being elected, Macri appointed him as Chief of the Cabinet of Ministers of Argentine Nation.

After the victory, thanks to his advice, Mauricio Macri began to introduce political, social and economic changes gradually and avoid using shock therapy.

On December 28, 2017, he ordered a press conference where he, Nicolás Dujovne, Luis Caputo, and the president of the Central Bank of Argentina, Federico Sturzenegger announced the change in inflation targets. Several economists repudiated the intervention of an independent institution that caused an acceleration in inflation and loss of reserves.

== Personal life ==
In 2002, he married journalist Luciana Mantero, with whom he has two children. Peña was also a fellow of the CIPPEC organization and the Poder Ciudadano Foundation.

== Writer ==
In May 2013 he presented the book “We are: An open invitation.” A series of stories compiled by him and Alejandro Rozitchner, which brings together testimonies of leaders, officials and militants of the PRO.

Political offices
Preceded by Aníbal Fernández	Chief of the Cabinet of Ministers; 2015–2019	Succeeded by Santiago Cafiero
