= Victoria Tolosa Paz =

Argentine politician

Victoria Tolosa-Paz
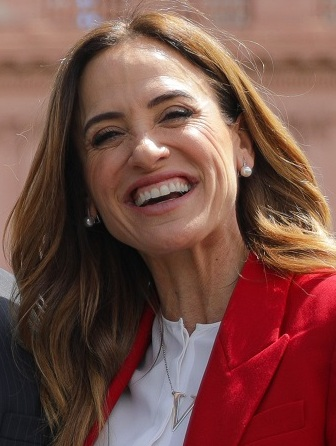

National Deputy
- Incumbent
- Assumed office 10 December 2023
- Constituency: Buenos Aires
- In office 10 December 2021 – 12 October 2022
- Constituency: Buenos Aires

Minister of Social Development
- In office 13 October 2022 – 10 December 2023
- President: Alberto Fernández
- Preceded by: Juan Zabaleta
- Succeeded by: Sandra Pettovello (as Minister of Human Capital)

Personal details
- Born: 24 June 1973 (age 53) La Plata, Argentina
- Party: Justicialist Party
- Other political affiliations: Unidad Ciudadana (2017–2019); Frente de Todos (2019–present)
- Education: Universidad Católica de La Plata

Victoria Tolosa-Paz (Spanish pronunciation: [bikˈtoɾja toˈlosa ˈpas]; born 24 June 1973) is an Argentine politician and public accountant. From 2022 to 2023, she served as Minister of Social Development in the cabinet of President Alberto Fernández. Since 2023, she has been a National Deputy elected in Buenos Aires Province, a position she previously held from 2021 to 2022.

She was also president of the National Council for the Coordination of Social Policies from 2020 to 2021, and member of the City Council of La Plata from 2017 to 2021.

== Early life and education ==
Tolosa Paz was born on 24 June 1973 in La Plata, into a middle-class family politically aligned with the Radical Civic Union. Her mother, Laura Figliozzi, was an employee at the Electoral Secretariat of La Plata's Federal Tribunal N. 1, while her father, Juan Honorio Tolosa Paz, is a researcher and astrologer. Tolosa Paz studied public accounting at the Universidad Católica de La Plata.

== Political career ==
In 2002, during the government of Eduardo Duhalde, she became an advisor to the Coordination area of the Minister Unit of the Ministry of Social Development.

In 2003, she was the Regional Head of the Participatory Social Investment Fund (FOPAR), a World Bank programme.

In the 2017 elections, Tolosa Paz was elected to the La Plata Partido City Council as the first candidate in the Unidad Ciudadana list; she has served in the position ad honorem, She forms part of the Frente de Todos bloc. She sought the Frente de Todos candidacy to the mayoralty of La Plata in the 2019 elections, but lost in the P.A.S.O. primaries against Florencia Saintout.

On 10 December 2019, she was appointed by President Alberto Fernández as Executive Secretary of the National Council for the Coordination of Social Policies. Later, on 17 July 2020, she was appointed president of the council. She resigned from her position and from her seat in the La Plata City Council on 25 August 2021, ahead of the 2021 legislative election, in preparation for her candidacy to the Chamber of Deputies in the Frente de Todos party list in Buenos Aires Province.

On 10 October 2022, it was announced Juan Zabaleta would resign from his position as Minister of Social Development. President Alberto Fernández then designated Tolosa Paz to the post, and she assumed office on 13 October 2022. It was one of three cabinet appointments made that day, alongside Ayelén Mazzina (to the Ministry of Women) and Kelly Olmos (to the Ministry of Labour). Her seat in the Chamber of Deputies was then assumed by Micaela Morán.

== Personal life ==
Tolosa Paz has been married twice, and has three children from her first marriage. Since 2012, she has been married to media businessman and former Media Secretary Enrique "Pepe" Albistur.

== Electoral history ==
Electoral history of Victoria Tolosa Paz
Election	Office	List	#	District	Votes			Result	Ref.
Election	Office	List	#	District	Total	%	P.	Result	Ref.
2017	Councillor	Unidad Ciudadana	1	La Plata Partido	115,801	27.23%	2nd (Note: Presented on an electoral list. The data shown represents the share of the vote the entire party/alliance received in that constituency.)	Elected	
2021	National Deputy	Frente de Todos	1	Buenos Aires Province	3,444,446	38.59%	2nd	Elected	
2023	National Deputy	Union for the Homeland	2	Buenos Aires Province	4,094,665	43.71%	1st	Elected	

Political offices
Preceded by Juan Zabaleta	Minister of Social Development; 2022–2023	Succeeded by Sandra Pettovello as Minister of Human Capital
