= Tomás Várnagy =

Argentine social scientist and philosopher (1950–2022)

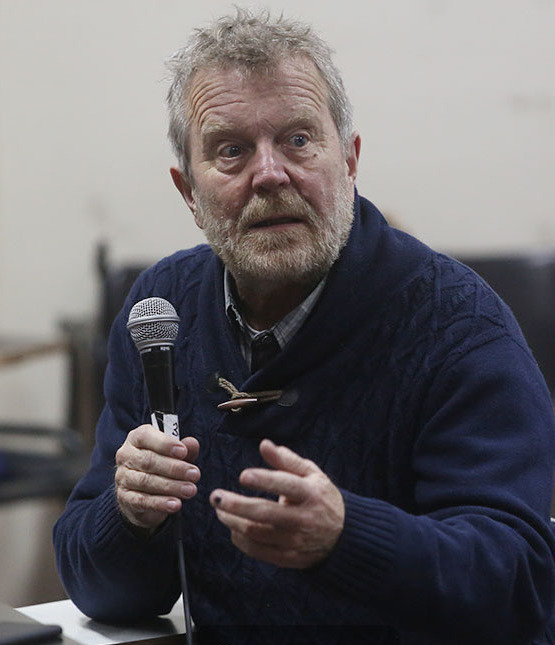
- Várnagy presenting in 2019
- Born: 25 September 1950; Buenos Aires, Argentina
- Died: June 2022 (aged 71)

Education
- Education: University of Buenos Aires

Philosophical work
- Era: Contemporary philosophy
- Main interests: Classic and modern political philosophy, political satire, the Soviet model and the Eastern Bloc, and United Nations peacekeeping
- Website: https://tomasvarnagy.wordpress.com/

Tomás Várnagy (25 September 1950 – June 2022) was an Argentine social scientist and philosopher, professor at the University of Buenos Aires (UBA).

== Early life and education ==
Várnagy was born in Buenos Aires. After completing his secondary studies in the United States, he studied philosophy at UBA, and he holds a master's degree in Eastern European sociology (Academy of Sciences of the Czech Republic and National University of Lomas de Zamora) and a PhD in social sciences (UBA). He also holds a higher degree in social sciences with a mention in political science from the Latin American Faculty of Social Sciences (FLACSO).

== Academic career ==
Between 2002 and 2004 Várnagy was the elected director of the Political Science career of the University of Buenos Aires Faculty of Social Sciences, where he was a university professor and chair of the subject Social and Political Theory II, and the adjunct of Social and Political Theory I. He also held the chair of Philosophy of Law at the National University of La Matanza (UNLaM). Previously he was, for 19 years, professor of seminars like Transition from Stalinism to Pluralism in Central Europe and The Soviet Model and its Application in Central Europe at the Political Science Department of the UBA. He has been a researcher, co-director and director of UBACyT and UNLaM research projects on communism, Soviet Union, Central and Eastern Europe, United Nations peacekeeping missions, the Kosovo conflict and political humor, among others.

He was director of the master's degree in National Defense, between 2005 and 2008, of the former National Defense School (current National Defense University (Argentina)), a position that he occupied again between 2014 and 2015. For 16 years he taught a politics course at the National Defense School. Between 2015 and 2016 he served as organizer dean of the recently created Faculty of National Defense, to which he remained linked as coordinator of the Observatory of Defense until 2018. Varnagy was also, since 2007, an academic member of the Canadian Defence Academy for the delivery of seminars on peacekeeping operations of the United Nations, which he also dictated with the Pearson Peacekeeping Center (Canada) between 2006 up to its closure in 2012. He has taught different courses at the master and doctorate level at several Argentine universities.

Outside of Argentina, he taught courses and conferences in Ankara, Asunción, Bogotá, Budapest, Cobán (Guatemala), Cochabamba, Las Palmas (Spain), Lima, Ljubljana, Melbourne, Montevideo, Pec (Kosovo), Rio de Janeiro, New York, Santiago de Compostela, Santiago, Washington and Jakarta.

== Publications ==
Varnagy is the author of numerous chapters, academic and journalistic articles in Spanish, English, and Hungarian. In addition, he is the author or compiler of the following books (in the Spanish language):

- Fortuna y virtud en la república democrática. Ensayos sobre Maquiavelo [Fortune and Virtue in the Democratic Republic. Essays on Machiavelli] (Buenos Aires, CLACSO/Eudeba, 2000). ISBN 950-9231-54-1
- Operaciones de paz de Naciones Unidas [United Nations Peacekeeping Operations] (Buenos Aires, EDENA, 2011) ISBN 978-987-9313-28-2
- Filosofía política y derecho [Philosophy, Politics, and Law] (San Justo, UNLaM, 2011). ISBN 978-987-1635-21-4
- Pensar la política desde los clásicos [Thinking Politics from the Classics] (Buenos Aires, EDENA, 2011). ISBN 978-987-9313-27-5
- Nostalgias del Este. Ensayos centroeuropeos [Nostalgia of the East. Central European Essays] (San Justo, Prometeo/UNLaM, 2011). ISBN 978-987-1635-25-2
- Pensar la política desde los clásicos II [Thinking Politics from the Classics II] (Buenos Aires, Facultad de Ciencias Sociales-UBA, 2012). ISBN 978-950-29-1391-9
- Caricaturas, afiches y humor político [Cartoons, Posters, and Political Humor] (Saarbrücken, Lapambert/Editorial Académica Española, 2011). ISBN 978-365-90063-4-0
- El Cono Sur en Haití; presente y futuro de la MINUSTAH [The Southern Cone in Haiti; Present and Future of MINUSTAH] (Buenos Aires, Ministerio de Defensa, 2012). ISBN 978-987-26552-4-2
- Democracia y control [Democracy and Control] (Buenos Aires, Asociación del Personal de los Organismos de Control, 2014). ISBN 978-987-23331-9-5
- Pensar la política desde Maquiavelo [Thinking Politics from Machiavelli] (with Miguel Ángel Rossi; Buenos Aires, SAAP, 2015). ISBN 978-987-1294-50-3
- "Proletarios de todos los países... ¡perdonadnos!": O sobre el humor político clandestino en los regímenes de tipo soviético y el papel deslegitimador del chiste en Europa central y oriental (1917-1991) ["Proletarians of all Countries ... Forgive us!" —Or On the Clandestine Political Humor in Soviet-type Regimes and the Delegitimizing Role of Jokes in Eastern Central Europe (1917-1991)] (Buenos Aires, EUDEBA, 2016 & Madrid, Clave Intelectual, 2016). ISBN 978-950-23253-2-3 ISBN 978-84-943433-6-0
- Antígona (y Madres de Plaza de Mayo) [Antigone (and Mothers of Plaza de Mayo)] (San Justo, UNLaM, 2018). ISBN 978-987-4417-28-2
