= Displacement of Israelis after the October 7 attacks =

Events following 2023 armed incursions

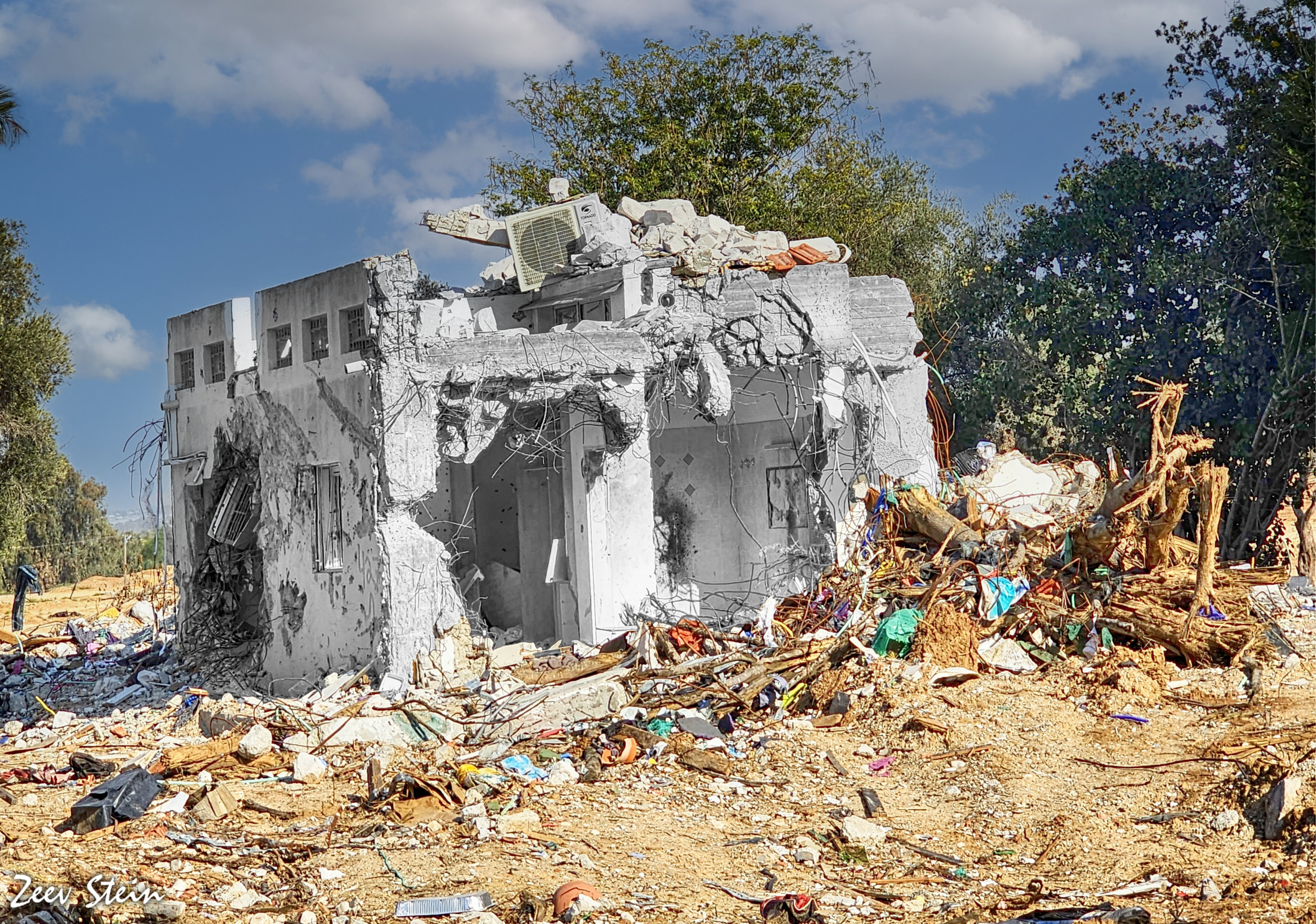
The residents of the Gaza Envelope communities were displaced after the October 7 attack

Displacement of Israelis after October 7, 2023 occurred following the October 7 attacks by Hamas and allied armed groups on southern Israel. Additional displacement occurred during the Israel–Hezbollah conflict (2023–present). The mass destruction inflicted by Hamas and Hezbollah's rocket strikes forced hundreds of thousands of Israeli civilians to leave their home.

Estimates indicate that approximately 200,000 to 240,000 Israelis were displaced, including those evacuated from communities directly targeted in the attacks and individuals who fled voluntarily due to security concerns. The displaced population originated primarily from two regions: southern border communities adjacent to the Gaza Strip, and northern border communities near Lebanon.

The displacement of Israelis following the October 7 attacks represents one of the largest internal displacements in Israel's recent history. The sudden scale of departures placed pressure on national and local authorities, who had to coordinate emergency evacuations, temporary housing, and long-term support for tens of thousands of families.

== Evacuation and temporary housing ==
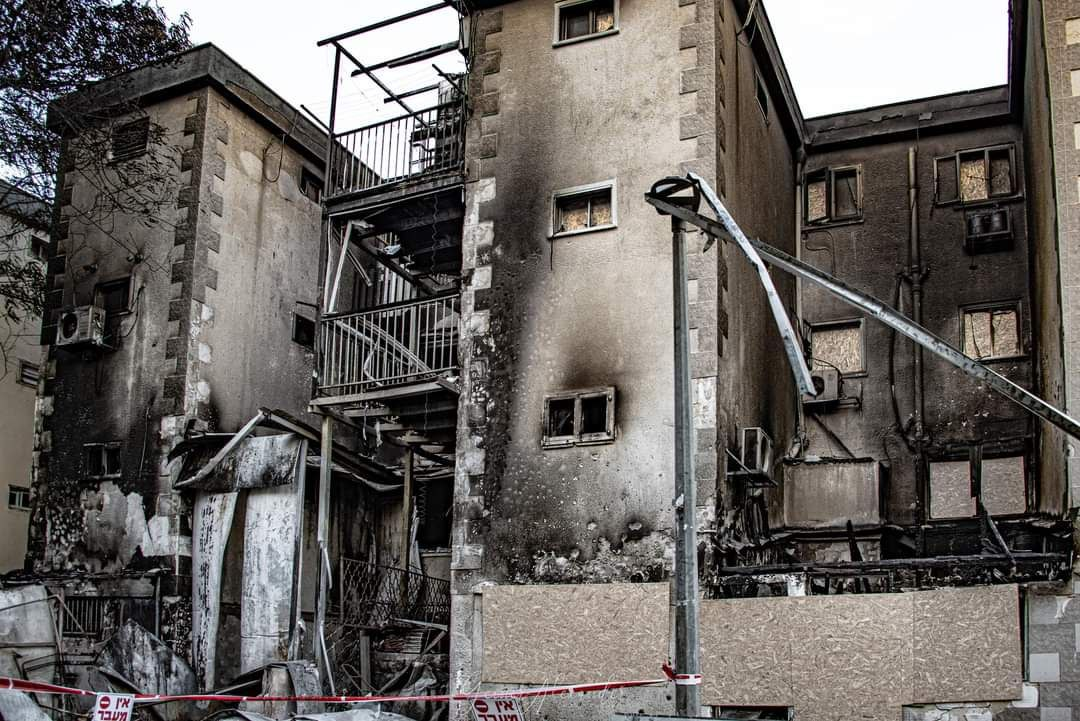
The city of Kiryat Shmona suffered damage from the Hezbollah attacks and its residents were evacuated

Evacuations were conducted across multiple southern and northern communities. In the south, numerous kibbutzim and moshavim in the "Gaza Envelope" were evacuated, while northern communities faced mandatory evacuations due to cross-border attacks and rocket fire. Approximately 250,000 Israeli were displaced. Displaced individuals were temporarily accommodated in hotels, guesthouses, kibbutzim, or with relatives and friends; at one point approximately 126,000 people were living in hotels across the country. Government agencies and civil society organizations coordinated housing, education, and support services, although resources were often strained by the scale of the displacement. Coordination challenges were compounded by the fact that many evacuated communities had lost not only physical infrastructure but also essential services such as local schools, clinics, and municipal buildings, requiring rapid relocation of entire community systems.

For example, the Shamriz family, sheltered in their safe room for 22 hours during the attack and when they escaped they left "with just the clothes on their backs and a handful of belongings." The evacuation operation for 32 southern border kibbutzim and moshavim was described by a local regional-council official as “unprecedented and very, very complicated,” costing 5.2 million shekels per week (£1.1m). People were placed in about 280 guest houses and hotels across the country, including resort towns, as part of the emergency relocation.

== Impact on civilians ==
Surveys conducted in the months following the attacks indicated that a substantial portion of displaced individuals experienced reduced income, job loss, and interrupted schooling. As one displaced resident from a southern kibbutz said "We are refugees in our own country."

An Israel Democracy Institute survey published in February 2025 found that 1 in 5 displaced Israelis had lost their jobs since the attack. Among Israelis evacuated from southern and northern communities, 44% reported that their current income was lower than before October 7, compared to the 35% reported as the national average. The psychological impact was considerable, with many displaced Israelis reporting trauma related to the attacks, including the death of relatives, abductions, and destruction of their communities. Return to previous residences was gradual, with some regions achieving partial repopulation while others remained sparsely inhabited due to extensive infrastructure damage. Mental health organizations reported surges in requests for trauma counseling, particularly among survivors of kibbutzim that suffered mass casualties, underscoring the long-term emotional burden of displacement.

== Return and reconstruction ==
Efforts to rebuild affected communities have included restoration of housing, utilities, and communal infrastructure. Some areas reported high rates of return, while others, particularly those most heavily damaged, continued to experience low levels of repopulation. Psychological and social recovery has been a significant aspect of the resettlement process.

In November 2023, an official in charge of evacuation for 32 communities said the state had begun "mapping the houses and sealing them so the winter will not harm them," and conversations had started about budgets to rebuild the homes. But they also stressed that rebuilding "concrete is the easy part", restoring people's sense of safety and allowing them to sleep in their own beds again would be far harder. In April 2024, the government approved a budget of approximately $6 billion, to rehabilitate communities across the border region.

The Tkuma Directorate, the government agency in charge of reconstructing the Gaza Envelope, released a report in September 2025 stating that $2.4 billion had been allocated. Additionally, the report estimated that 90% of displaced residents had returned and were joined by 2500 new residents. Recovery has been uneven across the Gaza Envelope. As of late 2025, the majority of Nahal Oz residents had not returned while Nir Oz and Be'eri had only recently begun reconstruction. Organizations like the Kibbutz Movement Rehabilitation Fund and the Jewish National Fund have raised money to help with the process.

== See also ==
- Sexual and gender-based violence against Israeli hostages during the Gaza war
- Israel–Hezbollah conflict (2023–present)
- Sexual and gender-based violence in the October 7 attacks
- Nir Oz attack
- Kfar Aza massacre
