= Santiago Cafiero =

Argentine politician

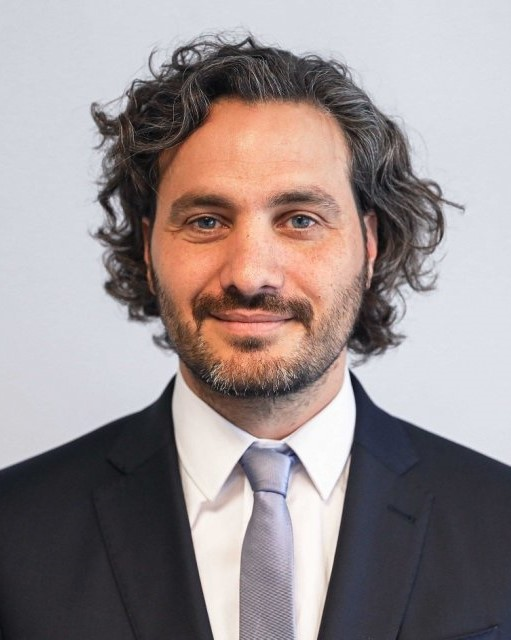
- Cafiero in 2019

National Deputy
- Incumbent
- Assumed office 10 December 2023
- Constituency: Buenos Aires

Minister of Foreign Affairs and Worship
- In office 20 September 2021 – 10 December 2023
- President: Alberto Fernández
- Preceded by: Felipe Solá
- Succeeded by: Diana Mondino

Chief of the Cabinet of Ministers
- In office 10 December 2019 – 20 September 2021
- President: Alberto Fernández
- Preceded by: Marcos Peña
- Succeeded by: Juan Manzur

Personal details
- Born: Santiago Andrés Cafiero; 30 August 1979 (age 47) San Isidro, Argentina
- Party: Justicialist Party
- Other political affiliations: Frente de Todos (2019–2023); Union for the Homeland (2023–present)
- Education: University of Buenos Aires (BA); Torcuato di Tella University (MPP)

Santiago Andrés Cafiero (Spanish pronunciation: [sanˈtja.ɣo anˈdɾes kaˈfje.ɾo]; born 30 August 1979) is an Argentine political scientist and politician, currently serving as a National Deputy elected in Buenos Aires Province. He previously served as Minister of Foreign Affairs and Worship (2021–2023) and as Cabinet Chief (2019–2021) in the cabinet of President Alberto Fernández.

== Early life and education ==
Santiago Andrés Cafiero was born on 30 August 1979 in San Isidro, in Buenos Aires Province, son of Juan Pablo Cafiero, who was Minister of Social Development during the presidency of Fernando de la Rúa in 2001, and María Luisa Bianchi. Cafiero's grandfather, Antonio Cafiero, held many important political posts, including the governorship of Buenos Aires, and also briefly served as Chief of the Cabinet of Ministers under Eduardo Camaño.

He began his political activism in the Peronist Youth in San Isidro. Cafiero studied political science at the University of Buenos Aires Faculty of Social Sciences, and then went on to receive a Master's Degree in public policy from Torcuato di Tella University.

== Political career ==
Cafiero was elected president of the local Justicialist Party in his native San Isidro in 2008, and was the party's mayoral candidate in 2011 and 2015. From 2009 to 2017, he was a councillor in San Isidro's municipal council.

During the governorship of Daniel Scioli in Buenos Aires, Cafiero worked as a consultant in the Undersecretariat of Municipal Affairs (2007–2008), and then went on to serve as the Province's Director of Industry from 2008 to 2010, Undersecretary of Industry, Commerce and Mining from 2010 to 2011, Vice-minister of Social Development and Undersecretary of Social Policies from 2011 to 2014, and Undersecretary of Modernization from 2014 to 2015.

Cafiero was Florencio Randazzo's campaign chief in Randazzo's 2017 senatorial run.

Ahead of the 2019 general election, Alberto Fernández, the Justicialist Party's presidential candidate, appointed Cafiero as his campaign chief and formed the Grupo Callao think tank alongside him.

On 29 October 2019, Fernández won the presidential election in the first round with 48.2% of the vote. On 6 December 2019, in the official announcement of his incoming cabinet's composition, President-elect Fernández named Cafiero as his Cabinet Chief, a post he assumed on 10 December 2019.

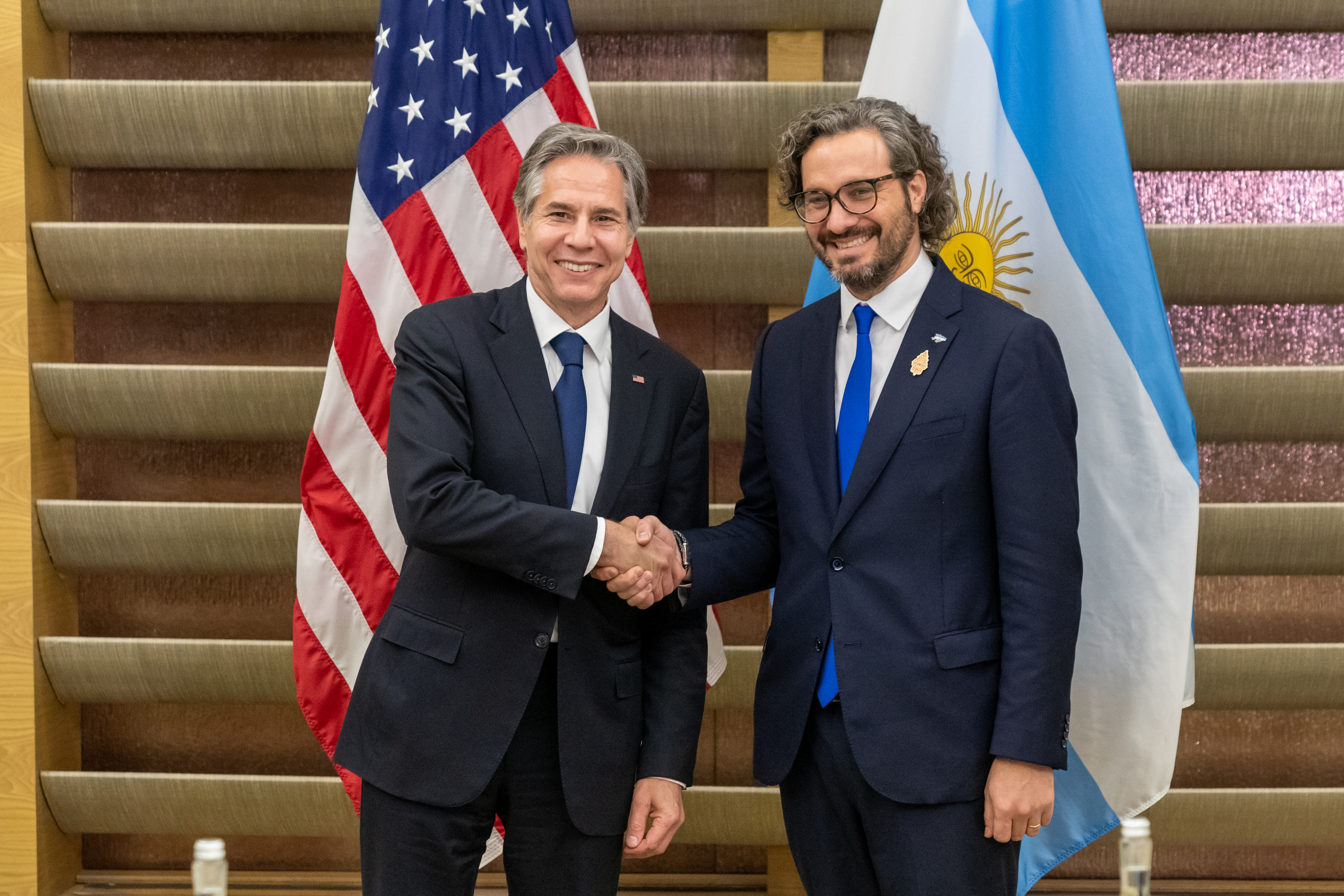
Cafiero with U.S. Secretary of State Antony Blinken in 2022

On 20 September 2021, Cafiero was appointed Minister of Foreign Affairs and Worship in replacement of Felipe Solá, and was replaced as Cabinet Chief by Juan Manzur. Manzur's appointment and Cafiero's designation as Foreign Minister were part of a cabinet reshuffle following the government's poor showings in the 2021 legislative primary elections.

Cafiero was in Dhaka on February 27 and 28, and in addition to the opening ceremony of the Embassy, he led a trade mission accompanied by 20 Argentine companies.

As Minister of Foreign Affairs, he led Argentina's presidency of the Community of Latin American and Caribbean States (CELAC), as well as the Economic Commission for Latin America and the Caribbean (ECLAC).He chaired the CELAC Foreign Ministers' Summit and the CELAC Meeting, as well as the Thirty-Ninth Session of ECLAC, with the participation of 60 delegations from countries in Latin America, the Caribbean, and Europe. Under his leadership, Argentina assumed the Presidency of the United Nations Human Rights Council, and of the Treaty on the Non-Proliferation of Nuclear Weapons, areas whose importance has been heightened by the war in Ukraine.

=== Member of the National Congress ===
Santiago Cafiero was elected to the National Congress representing the Province of Buenos Aires in the 2023 General Elections.

== Personal life ==
Cafiero is married and has four sons and one daughter. He co-founded the Punto de Encuentro ("Meeting Point") publishing house in 2015.

== Electoral history ==
=== Legislative ===
Electoral history of Santiago Cafiero
| Election | Office | List | # | District | Votes | | | Result | Ref. |
| Election | Office | List | # | District | Total | % | P. | Result | Ref. |
|---|---|---|---|---|---|---|---|---|---|
| 2009 | Councillor | Justicialist Party | 1 | San Isidro Partido | 14,753 | 8.18% | 4th (Note: Presented on an electoral list. The data shown represents the share of the vote the entire party/alliance received in that constituency.) | Elected | |
| 2023 | National Deputy | Union for the Homeland | 5 | Buenos Aires Province | 4,094,665 | 43.71% | 1st | Elected | |

Political offices
| Preceded by Marcos Peña | Chief of the Cabinet of Ministers; 2019–2021 | Succeeded by Juan Manzur |
| Preceded by Felipe Solá | Minister of Foreign Affairs and Worship; 2021–2023 | Succeeded by Diana Mondino |
