= Carolina Stanley =

Argentine lawyer and politician

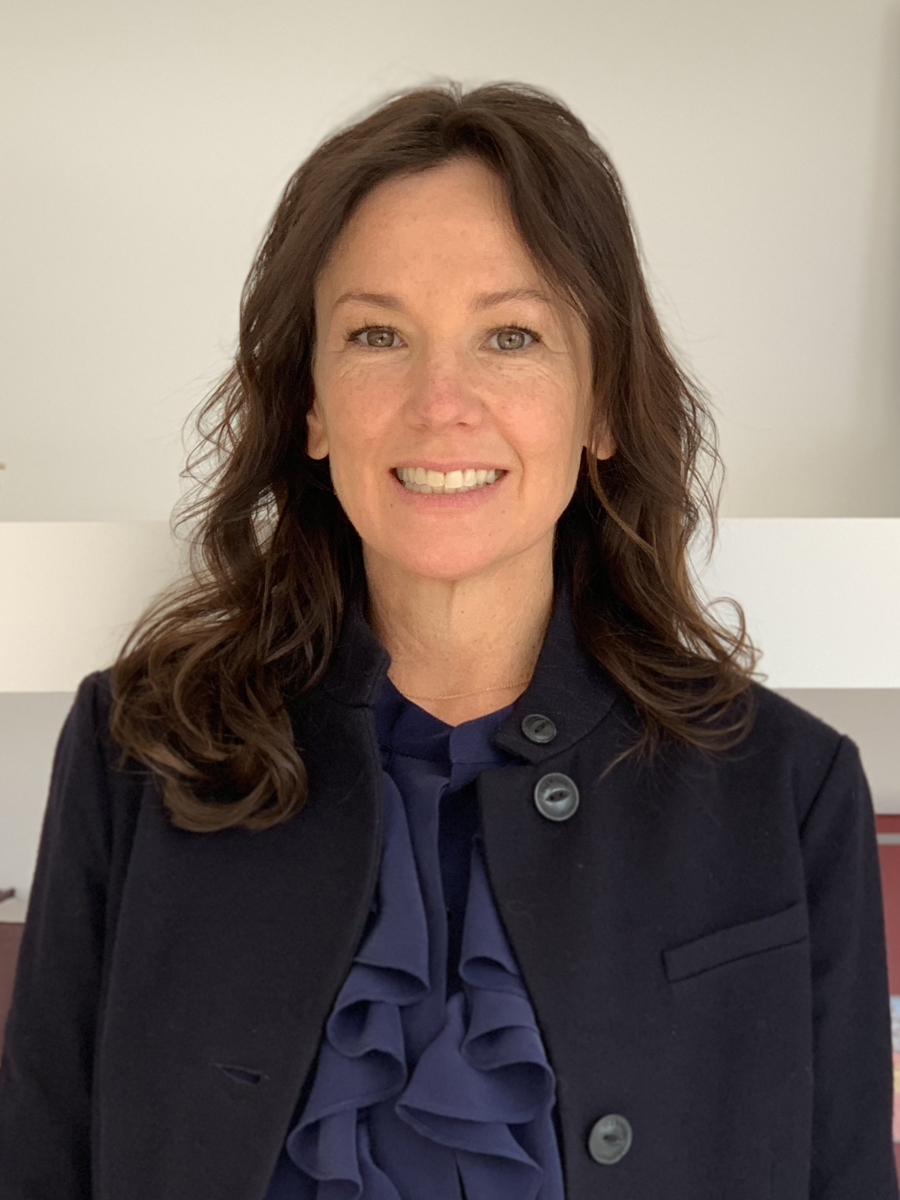

General Legal Advisor of the Public Guardian's Office of the Autonomous City of Buenos Aires
- Incumbent
- Assumed office 25 February 2021
- Preceded by: Yael Bendel

Minister of Health and Social Development
- In office 5 September 2018 – 10 December 2019
- President: Mauricio Macri
- Preceded by: Herself (as Minister of Social Development); Adolfo Rubinstein (as Minister of Health)
- Succeeded by: Ginés González García (as Minister of Health); Daniel Arroyo (as Minister of Social Development)

Minister of Social Development
- In office 10 December 2015 – 5 September 2018
- President: Mauricio Macri
- Preceded by: Alicia Kirchner
- Succeeded by: Herself

Personal details
- Born: 22 November 1975 (age 50) Buenos Aires, Argentina
- Party: Republican Proposal
- Spouse: Federico Salvai
- Children: 2
- Education: University of Buenos Aires

Carolina Stanley (born November 22, 1975, in Buenos Aires) is an Argentine lawyer and politician.

During Mauricio Macri’s presidency, she served as the Minister of Social Development of the Argentine Nation. Previously, she had been the Minister of Social Development of the City of Buenos Aires.

Since 2021, she has served as General Legal Advisor of the Public Guardian's Office of the Autonomous City of Buenos Aires.

== Biography ==
Carolina Stanley was born in Buenos Aires in 1975. She comes from a family of Irish descent. Her father is the Argentine entrepreneur Guillermo Stanley.

She is married to journalist and politician Federico Salvai [es], with whom she has two children.

She is a fan of River Plate.

=== Education ===
She completed her primary and secondary education at the bilingual St. Catherine's School. She obtained an international baccalaureate in English and French. She studied Law at the University of Buenos Aires, where she graduated with honors in 1999.

She complemented her undergraduate studies with a Training Program for Officials in Foreign Promotion and International Trade at the Valencian Institute of Exports (Spain) and a Young Political Leaders Exchange Program by Fundación Universitaria del Río de la Plata (FURP), held in the United States in 2002.

== Political activity ==
In 1998 and 2000, Stanley worked as a consultant at the Ministry of Foreign Affairs, International Trade, and Worship. Between 2000 and 2003, she worked at the Buenos Aires Legislature as an advisor on social policy issues to legislator María Laura Leguizamón. During her time at the legislature, she met Federico Salvai, her partner since then, with whom she got married in 2006.

In 2003, Stanley collaborated in the Commitment to Change campaign for the head of government of the City. After the unfavorable result, she joined the Sophia Group, where Stanley developed a relationship of collaboration and personal friendship with María Eugenia Vidal. At the initiative of Mauricio Macri, who was then president of Boca Juniors, Vidal and Stanley developed a community kitchen program in La Boca, the neighborhood of the club. Between 2004 and 2007, she was the executive director of the Sophia Group.

=== Government of the City of Buenos Aires ===
In 2007, Mauricio Macri became Head of Government of the City and appointed Stanley to lead the General Directorate for Strengthening Civil Society at the Ministry of Social Development. In her role, Stanley developed over 500 projects in collaboration with civil society organizations.

=== Legislator for the City of Buenos Aires ===
In the 2009 Argentine legislative elections, she ran as a candidate for legislator for Republican Proposal (PRO) and was elected. She presided over the Committee on Promotion and Social Integration Policies.

She advocated for a law aimed at preventing accidents caused by carbon monoxide, which was enacted in December 2009. In 2011, she presented a project to ensure the maintenance of the Early Childhood Centers, a policy launched by the City in 2009. In September 2011, she organized the First Conference on Disability and Social Inclusion at the Legislature.

=== Minister of Social Development of the City ===
In 2011, Stanley succeeded María Eugenia Vidal as head of the Ministry of Social Development of the City of Buenos Aires.

In June 2013, Stanley launched the "Operativo Frío" (Cold Weather Operation), which involved 700 agents and 40 mobile units that toured neighborhoods to assist homeless people affected by the winter temperatures in the City.

In 2013, she also launched the Adolescence Program, which consisted of cultural, sports, and science and technology workshops. That year, 10,000 young people from the City participated in the program. She also introduced the social program "Primeros Meses" (First Months), which provides medical assistance and financial support to mothers of newborns and pregnant women in vulnerable situations.

In November 2014, Stanley organized the 1st International Congress on Social Protection and Social Policies in the City of Buenos Aires, with representatives from UNICEF, UNESCO, ECLAC, among other organizations.

In 2012, 2013, and 2014, Stanley promoted audiovisual campaigns for the prevention and awareness of the "International Day for the Elimination of Violence Against Women." At that time, Stanley stated that in Argentina "in the last five years, a woman was killed every 30 hours as a victim of gender violence."

In 2014, she launched the "Violent Relationships" campaign after revealing that 10% of the reports they received were from situations of domestic violence. In the same vein, she was a strong advocate in the fight against human trafficking.

In December 2014, they inaugurated a new Early Childhood Center in Villa Soldati. The policy expanded to various areas of the City, where a total of 70 Early Childhood Centers were opened.

During her tenure, an Integral Women's Center (CIM) was created in each commune of the City. She developed the "Juegotecas" Program within the General Directorate of Children and Adolescence, which involved the creation of play spaces for children outside of school hours, with an interdisciplinary team of adults in charge. By 2014, there were 22 sites in the City, hosting around 1,300 children monthly.

In March 2015, the #QuéOnda campaign, aimed at raising awareness and preventing gender violence among adolescents, was recognized by the Buenos Aires Legislature.

=== Minister of Social Development of the Nation ===
In December 2015, Mauricio Macri appointed her as Minister of Social Development of the Nation, as well as president of the National Council for the Coordination of Social Policies.

In the first half of her tenure, the Universal allocation per child increased from 3.7 to 3.9 million beneficiaries by June 2016.

Since 2016, "El Estado en tu Barrio" (The State in Your Neighborhood) has been a program where various government agencies set up temporary booths in neighborhoods, allowing residents to access medical consultations, process personal documents, apply for social tariffs for public services, receive information on pension management, addiction and disease prevention, as well as participate in recreational activities for children. According to a report by Fundación Pensar, by 2019 the program had over 4,000 editions in 508 locations across the country, with an estimated 7 million procedures carried out.

In April 2016, the National Early Childhood Plan was established by decree, providing funding for daycare centers where, among other services, nutritional assistance is offered to children between 45 days and four years old.

Stanley created the National Register of Popular Neighborhoods (RENABAP). The survey revealed that, by 2018, there were 4,228 shantytowns (villas) in Argentina, home to approximately 3.5 million people. The 2017 national government budget included the creation of 547 spaces across the country.

The National Plan "Creer y Crear," also approved in April 2016, involved economic assistance managed by provincial governments to promote employability. This included the provision of microcredits, machinery, supplies, and the establishment of fairs and markets.

In 2018, the Ministry announced the National Plan for the Prevention of Teenage pregnancy, offering information, counseling in schools, and promoting the use of contraceptive methods. In Argentina, 7 out of 10 adolescent pregnancies were unintended. The number of pregnancies among minors had dropped from 110,000 to 94,000 between 2015 and 2017, although the figure was still alarming. At that time, Minister Stanley declared that she was against abortion but in favor of public debate and the consideration of the bill in the legislative sphere. Between 2015 and 2019, there was a 20% decrease in unintended pregnancies among adolescents.

She promoted the National Program "Primeros Años" (First Years), aimed at strengthening the parenting skills of families with children aged 0 to 4 years living in poverty. In 2019, a historic reduction in the infant mortality rate was achieved.

=== Buenos Aires City Public Guardianship Ministry ===
Since 2021, Stanley has served as General Guardian of the Buenos Aires City Public Guardianship Ministry (Ministerio Público Tutelar de la Ciudad Autónoma de Buenos Aires).

Together with María Eugenia Vidal and Milagros Maylin, she was one of the driving forces behind "La Marea" (The Tide), a network of community leaders who receive training to provide assistance in their own neighborhoods, the most vulnerable areas of the Buenos Aires metropolitan area. In 2022, she joined INSPIRE, a global United Nations initiative against child abuse. Within this framework, Stanley led the Comprehensive Action Plan against Violence toward Girls, Boys and Adolescents in the City of Buenos Aires, presented in April 2025. The plan constitutes a prevention and response strategy against violence targeting children and adolescents, with a horizon extending to 2030. Between 2022 and 2023, Stanley worked as a university lecturer, serving as instructor of the course "The right of girls, boys and adolescents to be heard" at the University of Buenos Aires. In 2024, the Public Guardianship Ministry presented the "Healthy Bonds and Responsible Parenting" (Vínculos Saludables y Crianza Responsable) program, with the support of UNICEF Argentina. The program, which had begun implementation in 2021, consists of group workshops aimed at parents and caregivers involved in legal proceedings related to situations of violence against children and adolescents.
