= Presidency of Fernando de la Rúa =

Argentine presidency from 1999 to 2001

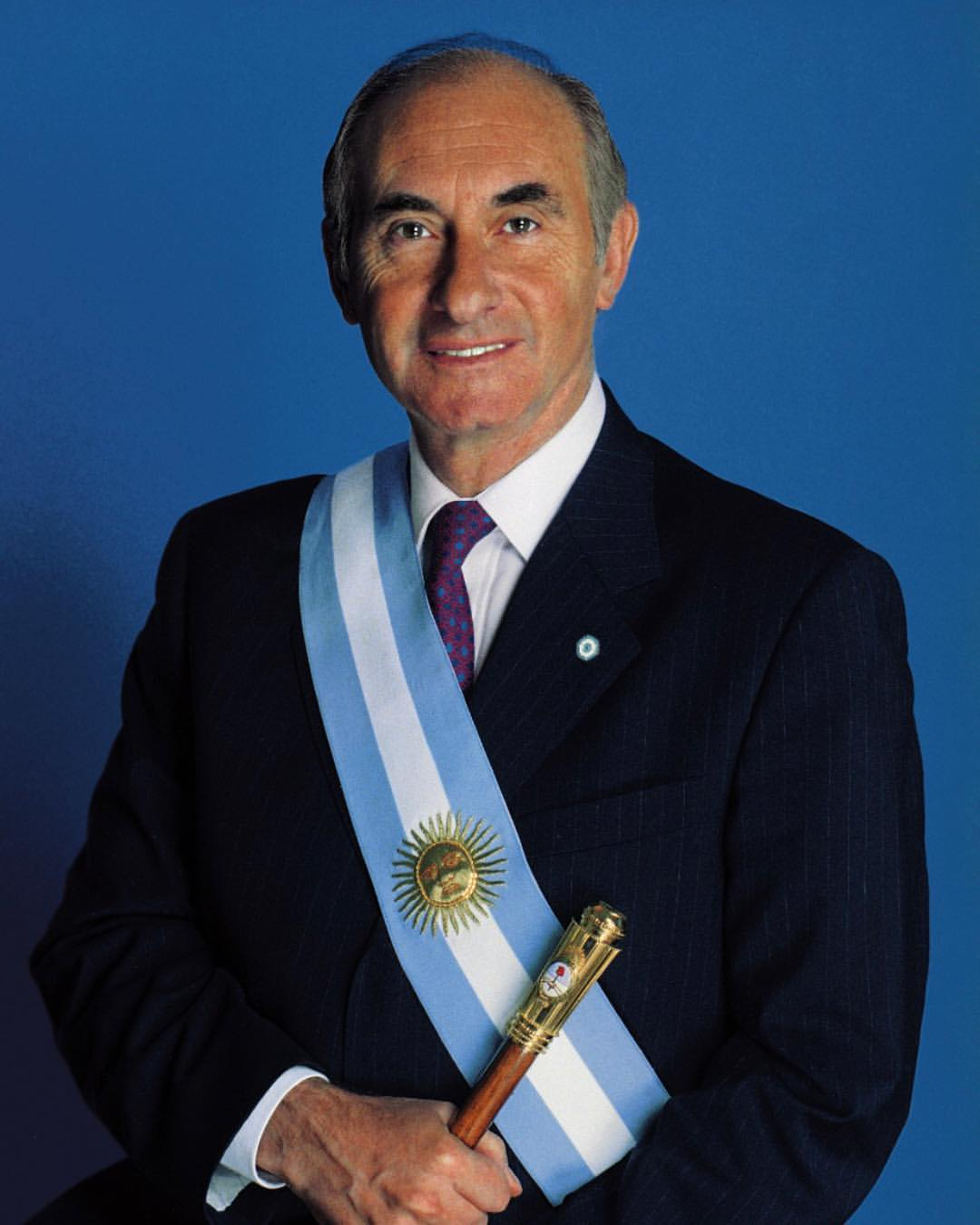
- Official portrait, 1999
- Presidency of Fernando de la Rúa; 10 December 1999 – 21 December 2001
- President: Fernando de la Rúa
- Party: Radical Civic Union (UCR), Alliance for Work, Justice and Education
- Election: 1999
- Seat: Casa Rosada; Quinta de Olivos
- Standard of the President

Fernando de la Rúa's tenure as president of Argentina began when he took office on 10 December 1999, and ended with his resignation on 21 December 2001 in the wake of the December 2001 crisis.

== Election ==
Fernando de la Rúa was elected on 24 October 1999 and took office on 10 December 1999. De la Rúa ran on the Alliance Party ticket as a Radical Civic Union member with running mate Carlos Álvarez. Along with the De la Rúa–Alvarez win, the Alliance Party gained a majority over the Justicialist Party in the Chamber of Deputies.

The De la Rúa–Álvarez ticket defeated the Peronist candidates Eduardo Duhalde and Ramón Ortega with 48.5% of the vote against 38.09%. In third place, with 10.09% of the vote, was the former economy minister Domingo Cavallo.

De la Rúa ran a successful TV advertising campaign with the slogan "They say I'm boring." The advertisement sought to be in contrast with a public perception of frivolity within the Carlos Menem administration. The campaign was led by Ramiro Agulla, David Ratto (the publicist for Raul Alfonsin in the 1983 elections), and Antonio de la Rúa, son of Fernando de la Rúa. During his father's presidency, Antonio de la Rúa led "The Sushi Group" (El grupo sushi), which was often criticized for its political influence.

== 1999 and 2000 ==
The public rejection of Menem along with the country's deteriorating economic situation strongly contributed to de la Rúa's victory. By the end of 1999, Argentina's GDP had dropped 3.4%. Unemployment had approached 14%. Although lower than previously, poverty was still at 30%. The country faced serious education and public health problems, and the political leadership had a poor public image.

The Peronist government had left a billion pesos deficit and an external annual debt of approximately 150 billion pesos, which would grow to nearly 25 billion pesos in the next year.

De la Rúa took harsh adjustment measures in the face of the country's financial situation. In January 2000, he raised taxes on the middle classes and upper classes. This policy was part of an overall package intended to improve the economy and attend to outstanding debts such as the Teacher Incentive Fund. However, it was too little to solve the deterioration of the public finances.

De la Rúa also intervened in the political situation in Corrientes province. There had been several months of consecutive labor strikes in the province. De la Rúa replaced governor Hugo Rubén Perie with Ramón Mestre.

On 8 June 2000, Menem was placed under house arrest on charges of leading a conspiracy to illegally sell 6,500 tons of weapons and ammunition to Ecuador and Croatia. A second charge was falsifying the contents of three presidential decrees. However, on 12 November, the Supreme Court of Argentina Decision ruled that there was no conspiracy and forgery and ordered Menem release

Throughout 2000, the De la Rúa government sought to control public spending, lower domestic interest rates and maintain monetary and financial stability. The year ended with a slight decline of 0.5% of GDP and an unemployment rate of 14.7% (INDEC October 2000). International reserves remained at 33 billion dollars and the fiscal deficit was reduced by about 5 billion pesos.

De la Rúa launched the Infrastructure Plan. Through agreements with provincial governments, and with private funding, he sought to perform road, water and housing improvements throughout the country for 20 billion dollars. De la Rúa enacted the plan through decree since, according to Interior Minister Federico Storani, there was no assurance that the Argentine Congress would approve the law as quickly as necessary.

De la Rúa's government asked for further assistance from the International Monetary Fund (IMF) and private banks to reduce the pressure of foreign debt. In December 2000, Economy Minister Jose Luis Machinea negotiated a bailout package of about 40,000 million dollars, known as a financial shield.

== 2001 ==
=== Education Reform Act ===
In 2001, De la Rúa proposed the Education Reform Act. The objectives of the act were seen as an attempt to weaken the power of large unions in favor of small ones, and to lower labor costs. The opposition Justicialists' opposed the measure and succeeded in weakening. Negotiations involved the then Labor Minister Alberto Flamarique and union leader Hugo Moyano. Moyano opposed the Act, arguing that it would result in lower wages and that it would be driven by the IMF. Flamarique promised that the national labor associations would still receiver union dues, but this was divided internally to the General Labor Confederation.

In October Vice President Carlos Alvarez resigned over allegations that he was bribing senator to vote for the Education Reform Act. The Alvarez resignation and the handling of the Act brought desertions from the center-left party congressmen who were dissatisfied with De la Rúa style of government.

=== Political weakness ===
In 2001, the Justicialista Party controlled the Senate while De la Rúa had a slim majority in the Chamber of Deputies. Trade union unrest continued, with seven general strikes. Frepaso began to distance themselves from De la Rúa after the Alvarez resignation, the appointment of Domingo Cavallo and the sustained economic policy. The head of the UCR, Raul Alfonsin, trying to avoid breaking the party.

In the 2001 legislative elections, the Peronist party won control of the Senate and the Chamber of Deputes. The Peronists won with 40% nationwide, versus 24% for the Alliance. The Alliance lost more than 4,500,000 votes from the election two years earlier.

Piqueteros groups throughout the country started blocking roads and streets in protest. While the Justicialist Party held the presidency of the Senate by Ramon Puerta, and appearing in the line of succession presidencial.

=== Economic programs ===
In January 2001 the Central Bank's international reserves reached a record high of 37.38 billion dollars. Economy Minister Ricardo Lopez Murphy announced widespread government budget cuts. Following this announcement, thousands of Argentines, especially students took to the streets in protest.

In March 2001, Minister of the Economy José Luis Machinea was replaced by then Defense Minister Ricardo Lopez Murphy. He put in place plans to stimulate the economy by making large cuts in public spending, withdrawing funds from areas such as health and education. Lopez Murphy's measures received fierce opposition from the Radical Party and its youth and college arms. Lopez Murphy was forced to retire after just 16 days in office.

De la Rúa replaced Lopez Murphy with Domingo Cavallo, who had held the job during the Menem government. Cavallo took office with the backing of the opposition and a strong push from the leader of Frepaso, Carlos "Chacho" Alvarez. However, Cavallo generated suspicion within the radicalist party. Cavallo took office promising an annual growth of 5%, trying to reduce distortionary taxes and reviving the industry. A tax on banking operations was approved and some delegation of power to the legislature was made. However, the markets and the international lending agencies reacted negatively.

In July 2001, because of the tax burden and the inability to normalize the economy, Cavallo turned to a strong economic orthodoxy. He presented a plan of "zero deficit", with a new board cut in public expenditure management to avoid spending more than it earned. The new program resulted in heavy resistance in the legislature.

In the summer, the government managed to attain parliamentary approval of the law on deposits intangibility. In October, unemployment rose to 18.3%. By December, the BCRA international reserves would fall to about 20 billion dollars.

In November, the government began a restructuring of external debt commitments, so-called "mega-swap". By the end of that month, the unprecedented worsening of the economic situation, investments fell due to the complicated situation policy that caused public distrust in the financial system. Strong withdrawals occurred from deposits in banks.

Cavallo imposed restrictions involving the freezing of funds deposited in banks, a measure known as the "corralito". The measure was enacted on 1 December and originally allowed only one withdrawal of 250 pesos per deposit per week in cash and the ban on sending of money outside of the country and the obligation to perform most of the business operations by checks, credit cards or debit cards. These measures were scheduled to last for 90 days.

These measures were highly unpopular. The IMF, meanwhile, refused to send 1.26 billion that was committed to working under the loan known as "shield", arguing that Argentina would not have met their commitments to maintain "zero deficit".

== End of presidency ==
By December, looting and rioting were occurring in major parts of Argentina. During the unrest, 27 people died and over 2,000 were injured.

On 19 December, De la Rúa declared a state of siege throughout the country. At midnight, Cavallo and the rest of the cabinet resigned. On 20 December the City of Buenos Aires and Greater Buenos Aires experienced large waves of looting of supermarkets and retail outlets. Thousands of people marched demanding the resignation the government. In the Buenos Aires downtown area, federal police were overwhelmed, but managed to keep violence out of the Plaza de Mayo. The unions called for strikes to protest the state of siege. Initially, the CTA began a 24-hour strike on 20 December.

Having lost the support of most of his own party, De la Rúa was forced out. At 19:45 on 20 December 2001, he resigned and left Casa Rosada by helicopter.

De la Rúa was replaced by San Luis Governor Adolfo Rodriguez Saa.
