= Ministry of Social Development (Argentina) =

Former government ministry of Argentina

- Ministerio de Desarrollo Social
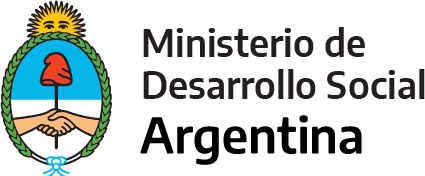

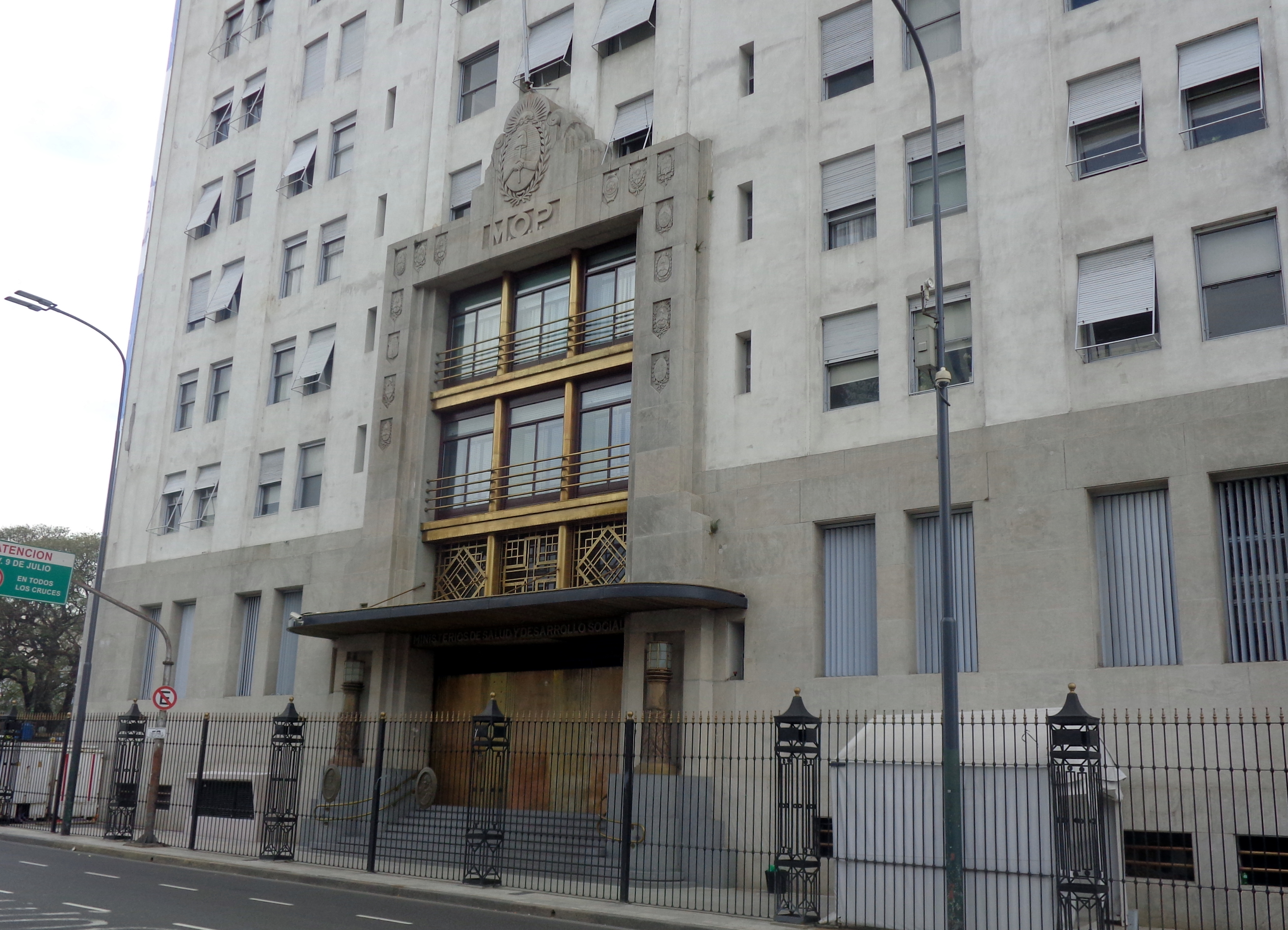
- Ministry of Public Works Building, seat

Ministry overview
- Formed: 1955
- Dissolved: December 10, 2023; 2 years ago
- Superseding Ministry: Ministry of Human Capital
- Jurisdiction: Government of Argentina
- Headquarters: Ministry of Public Works Building, Av. 9 de Julio 1925, Buenos Aires
- Annual budget: $ 252,626,198,315
- Minister responsible: Victoria Tolosa Paz

The Ministry of Social Development (Spanish: Ministerio de Desarrollo Social; MDS) was a ministry of the Argentine Government which oversaw the country's public policies on issues such as social assistance, welfare and human development across the country. The ministry was created in 1955 as the Ministry of Social Assistance, and it was given its current name in 1999 during the presidency of Fernando de la Rúa.

The ministry was dissolved on December 10, 2023 following a presidential decree from President Javier Milei.

== History ==
During the presidency of Juan Domingo Perón a constitutional reform expanded the ministries of the federal government creating the Ministry of Health. In 1955 the military coup of Eduardo Lonardi abolished many of the changes made by Perón, including the Ministry of Health, and created the Ministry of Social Assistance. It was soon after renamed Ministry of Social Assistance and Public Health, and later in 1966 renamed Ministry of Social Welfare, while still overseeing public health issues. During the 1983 democratic government of Raul Alfonsin the ministry was renamed again as Ministry of Health and Social Action, and in 1999 president Fernando De la Rúa decided to split the two ministries again, giving each the same precedence in the Cabinet of Ministers. Thus the modern Ministry of Social Development was born, which was again briefly merged with the Ministry of Health during the presidency of Mauricio Macri regarding budget cuts in 2018. In 2019, former president Alberto Fernandez decided to split both ministries again on the first day in office, and thus the Ministry of Social Development became a ministry on itself again until it was dissolved.

== Function and objectives ==
Decree 141 signed by president Nestor Kirchner in 2003 modifies the Law of Ministries to clearly state the function and objectives of the Ministry of Social development, among which we can name:

- Execute actions towards modifying attitudes in the general population from a social perspective, and also planning and auditing any actions regarding promotion, protection, training and development of human groups with social needs, within the policies established by the federal government, and international treaties.
- To intervene in those cases of social emergency that require assistance from the government, in coordination with the Ministry of Health.
- Execute actions towards securing financing plans of social development.
- Formulate, normalize, coordinate, audit and evaluate food policies applied in federal, provincial and local levels.
- Execute actions of direct assistance to people in situation of social risk, both inside the country and abroad, participating in international help plans.
- Formulate policies destined to infancy, youth and family; design, execute, coordinate, audit and evaluate programs of promotion, protection, social integration and defense of the rights of minors, following the guidelines of the United Nations Convention on the Rights of the Child.
- Formulate policies regarding social promotion destined to the youth.
- Formulate policies towards strengthening social economy, and to design, execute, coordinate, audit and evaluate programs of microcredit destined to the socially vulnerable population.
- Assign and distribute subsidies to resolve unpredicted states of necessity, or those not covered by current programs, and those given to public or private institutions that develop activities benefiting the general population.

== Central building ==
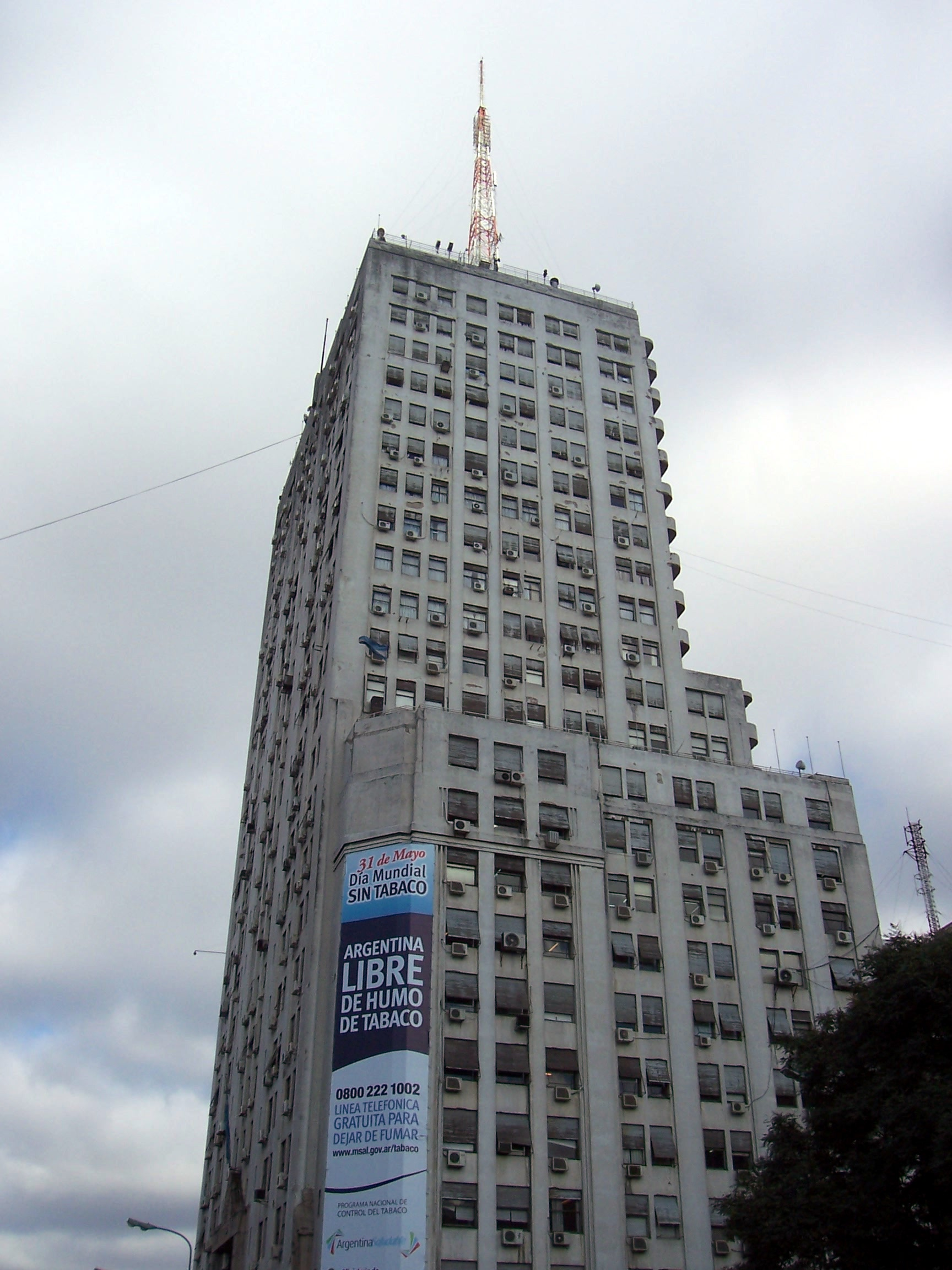
The Ministry of Public Works Building, seat of the Ministry

The Ministry of Social Development has offices in over 50 locations across the country, but the central office is located in what is known as the Ministry of Public Works building, a rationalist style building located in the famous 9 de julio avenue in downtown Buenos Aires, between Moreno street and Belgrano avenue. The building originally housed the offices of the Ministry of Public Works since its inauguration in 1935, and President Carlos Menem relocated the ministry to a building near the Casa Rosada in 1991, allowing the then Ministry of Health and Social Action to have a new headquarters. After the split during the De la Rúa presidency, of the 22 floors of the building, the top 10 floors house the central offices of Social Development and the bottom 11 to the current Ministry of Health. The ground floor office space is split among the two ministries. Social Development also has offices in other 8 locations within the city of Buenos Aires, and offices in at least one city of every province of Argentina.

The building was built from 1932 to 1936, right around the time the government began plans to bulldoze complete blocks of buildings in a north–south corridor to create the 9 de julio avenue. By 1947, bulldozing and construction of the avenue reached the southern tip by Moreno street, but the building was spared from demolition, as it was the Ortiz Basualdo palace (headquarters of the French Embassy in Argentina) and the Palacio Álzaga Unzué in the northern end of the avenue. The avenue thus currently has a choke point between Belgrano avenue and Moreno Street, where the car lanes have to go around this building. It is the only building with a 9 de julio street address.

The building is notable for having two gigantic metal contour portraits of Eva Perón in the south and north facades, as a reminder of her dedication to the social development and welfare of the socially vulnerable population.

== List of ministers ==
No.	Minister	Party	Term	President
Ministry of Social Assistance (1955)
1	Ernesto Rottger	Independent (Military)	23 September 1955 – 13 November 1955	Eduardo Lonardi
Ministry of Social Assistance and Public Health (1958–1966)
2	Héctor Noblía	Radical Civic Union	1 May 1958 – 26 March 1962	Arturo Frondizi
3	Tiburcio Padilla	Independent	26 March 1962 – 29 March 1962	Arturo Frondizi
3	Tiburcio Padilla	Independent	29 March 1962 – 1 July 1963	José María Guido
4	Horacio Rodríguez Castells	Independent	1 July 1963 – 12 October 1963	José María Guido
5	Arturo Oñativia	Radical Civic Union	12 October 1963 – 28 June 1966	Arturo Illia
Ministry of Social Welfare (1966–1981)
6	Roberto J. Petracca	Independent	28 June 1966 – 1 January 1967	Juan Carlos Onganía
7	Julio Emilio Álvarez	Independent	1 January 1967 – 20 March 1967	Juan Carlos Onganía
8	Conrado Bauer	Independent	20 March 1967 – 8 June 1969	Juan Carlos Onganía
9	Carlos Consigli	Independent	10 June 1969 – 8 June 1970	Juan Carlos Onganía
10	Francisco Manrique	Federal Party	8 June 1970 – 10 February 1971	Marcelo Levingston
11	Amadeo Frúgoli	Democratic Party	10 February 1971 – 23 March 1971	Marcelo Levingston
12	Francisco Manrique	Federal Party	23 March 1971 – 8 August 1972	Alejandro Lanusse
13	Oscar Puiggrós	Christian Democratic Party	8 August 1972 – 25 May 1973	Alejandro Lanusse
14	José López Rega	Justicialist Party	25 May 1973 – 13 July 1973	Héctor Cámpora
14	José López Rega	Justicialist Party	13 July 1973 – 12 October 1973	Raúl Lastiri
14	José López Rega	Justicialist Party	12 October 1973 – 1 July 1974	Juan Domingo Perón
14	José López Rega	Justicialist Party	1 July 1974 – 11 July 1975	Isabel Perón
15	Carlos Villone	Justicialist Party	11 July 1975 – 20 July 1975	Isabel Perón
16	Rodolfo Roballos	Independent	20 July 1975 – 11 August 1975	Isabel Perón
17	Carlos Emery	Justicialist Party	11 August 1975 – 29 October 1975	Isabel Perón
18	Aníbal Demarco	Justicialist Party	29 October 1975 – 24 March 1976	Isabel Perón
19	Julio Bardi	Independent (Military)	29 March 1976 – 30 October 1978	Jorge Rafael Videla
20	Jorge A. Fraga	Independent (Military)	30 October 1978 – 29 March 1981	Jorge Rafael Videla
Ministry of Social Action (1981–1983)
21	Carlos Lacoste	Independent (Military)	29 March 1981 – 1 July 1982	Roberto Eduardo Viola
21	Carlos Lacoste	Independent (Military)	29 March 1981 – 1 July 1982	Leopoldo Galtieri
22	Adolfo Navajas Artaza	Independent	1 July 1982 – 10 December 1983	Reynaldo Bignone
Ministry of Health and Social Action (1983–1999)
23	Aldo Neri	Radical Civic Union	10 December 1983 – 15 April 1986	Raúl Alfonsín
24	Conrado Storani	Radical Civic Union	15 April 1986 – 16 September 1987	Raúl Alfonsín
25	Ricardo Barrios Arrechea	Radical Civic Union	16 September 1987 – 26 May 1989	Raúl Alfonsín
26	Enrique Beveraggi	Radical Civic Union	26 May 1989 – 8 July 1989	Raúl Alfonsín
27	Julio Corzo	Justicialist Party	8 July 1989 – 23 September 1989	Carlos Menem
28	Antonio Erman González	Christian Democratic Party	23 September 1989 – 14 December 1989	Carlos Menem
29	Eduardo Bauzá	Justicialist Party	15 December 1989 – 20 September 1990	Carlos Menem
30	Alberto Kohan	Justicialist Party	20 September 1990 – 16 January 1991	Carlos Menem
31	Avelino Porto	Justicialist Party	16 January 1991 – 3 December 1991	Carlos Menem
32	Julio César Aráoz	Justicialist Party	3 December 1991 – 22 April 1993	Carlos Menem
33	Alberto José Mazza	Justicialist Party	22 April 1993 – 10 December 1999	Carlos Menem
Ministry of Social Development (1999–2018)
34	Graciela Fernández Meijide	Broad Front	10 December 1999 – 12 March 2001	Fernando de la Rúa
35	Marcos Makón	Independent	12 March 2001 – 20 March 2001	Fernando de la Rúa
36	Juan Pablo Cafiero	Broad Front	20 March 2001 – 22 October 2001	Fernando de la Rúa
37	Daniel Sartor	Radical Civic Union	22 October 2001 – 21 December 2001	Fernando de la Rúa
38	María Nélida Doga	Justicialist Party	12 February 2002 – 25 May 2003	Eduardo Duhalde
39	Alicia Kirchner	Justicialist Party	25 May 2003 – 10 December 2005	Néstor Kirchner
40	Juan Carlos Nadalich	Justicialist Party	10 December 2005 – 14 August 2006	Néstor Kirchner
41	Alicia Kirchner	Justicialist Party	14 August 2006 – 10 December 2007	Néstor Kirchner
41	Alicia Kirchner	Kolina	10 December 2007 – 10 December 2015	Cristina Fernández de Kirchner
42	Carolina Stanley	Republican Proposal	10 December 2015 – 5 September 2018	Mauricio Macri
Ministry of Health and Social Development (2018–2019)
42	Carolina Stanley	Republican Proposal	5 September 2018 – 10 December 2019	Mauricio Macri
Ministry of Social Development (2019–2023)
43	Daniel Arroyo	Renewal Front	10 December 2019 – 10 August 2021	Alberto Fernández
44	Juan Zabaleta	Justicialist Party	10 August 2021 – 13 October 2022	Alberto Fernández
45	Victoria Tolosa Paz	Justicialist Party	13 October 2022 – 10 December 2023	Alberto Fernández
