= List of Argentine deputies, 2015–2017 =

This is list of members of the Argentine Chamber of Deputies from 10 December 2015 to 9 December 2017.

== Composition ==
=== By province ===
Province	Deputies	Population (2010)
Buenos Aires	70	15,625,084
Buenos Aires City	25	2,890,151
Catamarca	5	367,828
Chaco	7	1,053,466
Chubut	5	506,668
Córdoba	18	3,304,825
Corrientes	7	993,338
Entre Ríos	9	1,236,300
Formosa	5	527,895
Jujuy	6	672,260
La Pampa	5	316,940
La Rioja	5	331,847
Mendoza	10	1,741,610
Misiones	7	1,097,829
Neuquén	5	550,334
Río Negro	5	633,374
Salta	7	1,215,207
San Juan	6	680,427
San Luis	5	431,588
Santa Cruz	5	272,524
Santa Fe	19	3,200,736
Santiago del Estero	7	896,461
Tierra del Fuego	5	126,190
Tucumán	9	1,448,200

=== By political groups ===
As of 9 December 2017

Alliance	Political party	Leader
Cambiemos (86)	Unión PRO (41)	Mario Negri
Cambiemos (86)	Unión Cívica Radical (36)	Mario Negri
Cambiemos (86)	Coalición Cívica (5)	Mario Negri
Cambiemos (86)	Frente Cívico y Social de Catamarca (2)	Mario Negri
Cambiemos (86)	Libertad, Valores y Cambio (1)	Mario Negri
Cambiemos (86)	Partido Demócrata Progresista (1)	Mario Negri
Frente para la Victoria-PJ (71)	Frente para la Victoria-PJ (70)	Héctor Recalde
Frente para la Victoria-PJ (71)	Movimiento Solidario Popular (1)	Héctor Recalde
Federal Unidos por una Nueva Argentina (37)	Federal Unidos por una Nueva Argentina (23)	Sergio Massa
Federal Unidos por una Nueva Argentina (37)	Unidos por una Nueva Argentina (6)	Sergio Massa
Federal Unidos por una Nueva Argentina (37)	Trabajo y Dignidad (2)	Sergio Massa
Federal Unidos por una Nueva Argentina (37)	Movimiento Popular Neuquino (2)	Sergio Massa
Federal Unidos por una Nueva Argentina (37)	Compromiso con San Juan (1)	Sergio Massa
Federal Unidos por una Nueva Argentina (37)	Unión por Entre Ríos (1)	Sergio Massa
Federal Unidos por una Nueva Argentina (37)	Chubut Somos Todos (1)	Sergio Massa
Federal Unidos por una Nueva Argentina (37)	Diálogo y Trabajo (1)	Sergio Massa
Justicialista (17)		Oscar Alberto Romero
Frente Amplio Progresista (8)	Partido Socialista (4)	Alicia Mabel Ciciliani (Co-president)
Frente Amplio Progresista (8)	Libres del Sur (3)	Victoria Donda (Co-president)
Frente Amplio Progresista (8)	Generation for a National Encounter (1)	Margarita Stolbizer (Co-president)
Frente Cívico por Santiago (6)		Cristián Oliva
Peronismo para la Victoria (5)		Leonardo Grosso
Juntos por Argentina (4)	Juntos por Argentina (3)	Darío Giustozzi
Juntos por Argentina (4)	Primero Tucumán (1)	Darío Giustozzi
Compromiso Federal (3)		Ivana Bianchi
Frente de la Concordia Misionero (3)		Jorge Daniel Franco
Frente de Izquierda y de los Trabajadores (2)		Pablo Sebastián López
Del Bicentenario (2)		Juan Francisco Casañas
Brigadier General Juan Bautista Bustos (2)		Ramón Ernesto Bernabey
One deputy parties (11)	Solidario Sí (1)	Carlos Heller
One deputy parties (11)	Frente de Izquierda Socialista-Frente de Izquierda (1)	Juan Carlos Giordano
One deputy parties (11)	Cultura, Educación y Trabajo (1)	Francisco Plaini
One deputy parties (11)	Proyecto Sur (1)	Alcira Argumedo
One deputy parties (11)	Salta Somos Todos (1)	Alfredo Olmedo
One deputy parties (11)	Avanzar San Luis (1)	Claudio Poggi
One deputy parties (11)	Partido Bloquista de San Juan (1)	Graciela María Caselles
One deputy parties (11)	Bloque de los Trabajadores (1)	Héctor Daer
One deputy parties (11)	PTS – Frente de Izquierda (1)	Nathalia González Seligra
One deputy parties (11)	Frente Norte (1)	Sandro Adrián Guzmán
One deputy parties (11)	Concertación-FORJA (1)	Juan Manuel Pereyra

== Election cycles ==
Election	Term	
Election	Start	End
2013	10 December 2013	9 December 2017
2015	10 December 2015	9 December 2019

== List of Deputies ==
The table is sorted by provinces in alphabetical order, and then with their deputies in alphabetical order by their surnames. All deputies start their term on December 10, and end it on December 9 of the corresponding years, except when noted.

- Deputies that were elected for a new 4-year term in the 2017 elections.

Province	Portrait	Deputy	Party	Term stars	Term ends
Buenos Aires		Samanta María Celeste Acerenza	Unión PRO	2015	2019
Buenos Aires		Gilberto Oscar Alegre	Federal Unidos por una Nueva Argentina	2013	2017
Buenos Aires		Ricardo Luis Alfonsín	Unión Cívica Radical	2013	2017
Buenos Aires		Horacio Fernando Alonso	Federal Unidos por una Nueva Argentina	2016 (Note: Since 1 March 2016. Replaced José Adrián Pérez after he resigned on 10 December 2015.)	2017
Buenos Aires		María Cristina Álvarez Rodríguez	Frente para la Victoria-PJ	2015	2019
Buenos Aires		Eduardo Pablo Amadeo	Unión PRO	2015	2019
Buenos Aires		Gustavo Héctor Arrieta	Frente para la Victoria-PJ	2016 (Note: Since 1 March 2016. Replaced Verónica Magario after she resigned on 10 December 2015 to become mayor of La Matanza Partido.)	2017
Buenos Aires		Karina Banfi	Unión Cívica Radical	2015	2019
Buenos Aires		Miguel Ángel Bazze	Unión Cívica Radical	2015	2019
Buenos Aires		Gustavo Bevilacqua	Federal Unidos por una Nueva Argentina	2015	2019
Buenos Aires		Diego Luis Bossio	Justicialista	2015	2019
Buenos Aires		Myriam Bregman	Izquierda Socialista-Frente de Izquierda	2015 (Note: Since 10 June 2015. Replaced Néstor Pitrola after her resignation.)	2016 (Note: Resigned on 6 December 2016. Replaced by Juan Carlos Giordano.)
Buenos Aires		Sergio Omar Buil	Unión PRO	2015	2019
Buenos Aires		Graciela Camaño	Federal Unidos por una Nueva Argentina	2015	2019
Buenos Aires		Remo Gerardo Carlotto	Peronismo para la Victoria	2013	2017
Buenos Aires		Carlos Daniel Castagneto	Frente para la Victoria-PJ	2015	2019
Buenos Aires		Franco Agustín Caviglia	Juntos por Argentina	2013	2017
Buenos Aires		Luis Francisco Jorge Cigogna	Frente para la Victoria-PJ	2013	2017
Buenos Aires		Diana Beatriz Conti	Frente para la Victoria-PJ	2013	2017
Buenos Aires		Verónica Carolina Couly	Federal Unidos por una Nueva Argentina	2017 (Note: Since 15 February 2017. Replaced Gladys González after she resigned on 10 January 2017 to become President of "Autoridad de Cuenca Matanza Riachuelo".)	2017
Buenos Aires		Héctor Ricardo Daer	Bloque de los Trabajadores	2013	2017
Buenos Aires		José Ignacio de Mendiguren	Federal Unidos por una Nueva Argentina	2013	2017
Buenos Aires		Eduardo Enrique de Pedro	Frente para la Victoria-PJ	2015	2019
Buenos Aires		Julio de Vido	Frente para la Victoria-PJ	2015	2017 (Note: Suspended member and in jail since 25 October 2017 for corruption charges.)
Buenos Aires		Edgardo Fernando Depetri	Frente para la Victoria-PJ	2013	2017
Buenos Aires		Juliana Di Tullio	Frente para la Victoria-PJ	2013	2017
Buenos Aires		Alejandro Carlos Augusto Echegaray	Unión Cívica Radical	2015	2019
Buenos Aires		María Azucena Ehcosor	Federal Unidos por una Nueva Argentina	2013	2017
Buenos Aires		Eduardo Alberto Fabiani	Juntos por Argentina	2013	2017
Buenos Aires		Francisco Abel Furlán	Frente para la Victoria-PJ	2015	2019
Buenos Aires		María Teresa García	Frente para la Victoria-PJ	2013	2017
Buenos Aires		Juan Carlos Giordano	Izquierda Socialista-Frente de Izquierda	2016 (Note: Since 6 December 2016. Replaced Myriam Bregman after her resignation.)	2017
Buenos Aires		Rubén Darío Giustozzi	Juntos por Argentina	2013	2017
Buenos Aires		Nathalia Inés González Seligra	PTS – Frente de Izquierda	2017 (Note: Since 9 June 2017. Replaced Néstor Pitrola after his resignation.)	2019
Buenos Aires		Gladys Esther González	Unión PRO	2013	2017 (Note: Resigned on 10 January 2017 to become President of "Autoridad de Cuenca Matanza Riachuelo". Replaced by Verónica Carolina Couly on 15 February 2017.)
Buenos Aires		Adrián Eduardo Grana	Frente para la Victoria-PJ	2015	2019
Buenos Aires		Dulce Granados	Frente para la Victoria-PJ	2013	2017
Buenos Aires		Leonardo Grosso	Peronismo para la Victoria	2015	2019
Buenos Aires		María Isabel Guerín	Frente para la Victoria-PJ	2015	2019
Buenos Aires		Héctor María Gutiérrez	Unión Cívica Radical	2013	2017
Buenos Aires		Sandro Adrián Guzmán	Frente Norte	2013	2017
Buenos Aires		Carlos Miguel Kunkel	Frente para la Victoria-PJ	2013	2017
Buenos Aires		Daniel Andrés Lipovetzky	Unión PRO	2015	2019
Buenos Aires		Mónica Edith Litza	Federal Unidos por una Nueva Argentina	2016 (Note: Since 1 March 2016. Replaced Christian Gribaudo after he resigned on 10 December 2015.)	2017
Buenos Aires		Silvia Gabriela Lospennato	Unión PRO	2015	2019
Buenos Aires		Soledad Martínez	Unión PRO	2013	2017
Buenos Aires		Sergio Tomás Massa	Federal Unidos por una Nueva Argentina	2013	2017
Buenos Aires		Mayra Soledad Mendoza	Frente para la Victoria-PJ	2015	2019
Buenos Aires		Emilio Monzó	Unión PRO	2015	2019
Buenos Aires		Cecilia Moreau	Federal Unidos por una Nueva Argentina	2015	2019
Buenos Aires		Carlos Julio Moreno	Frente para la Victoria-PJ	2013	2017
Buenos Aires		Juan Facundo Moyano	Federal Unidos por una Nueva Argentina	2015	2019
Buenos Aires		Marcela Fabiana Passo	Federal Unidos por una Nueva Argentina	2015	2019
Buenos Aires		Raúl Joaquín Pérez	Federal Unidos por una Nueva Argentina	2015	2019
Buenos Aires		Néstor Antonio Pitrola	Frente de Izquierda y de los Trabajadores	2015	2017 (Note: Resigned on 9 June 2017. Replaced by Nathalia Gonzaléz Seligra.)
Buenos Aires		Francisco Omar Plaini	Cultura, Educación y Trabajo	2013	2017
Buenos Aires		María Fernanda Raverta	Frente para la Victoria-PJ	2015	2019
Buenos Aires		Héctor Pedro Recalde	Frente para la Victoria-PJ	2013	2017
Buenos Aires		Alberto Oscar Roberti	Justicialista	2015	2019
Buenos Aires		Rodrigo Martín Rodríguez	Frente para la Victoria-PJ	2015	2019
Buenos Aires		Oscar Alberto Romero	Justicialista	2013	2017
Buenos Aires		Claudia Mónica Rucci	Unidos por una Nueva Argentina	2016 (Note: Since 1 March 2016. Replaced Francisco de Narváez after she resigned on 10 December 2015.)	2017
Buenos Aires		María Liliana Schwindt	Federal Unidos por una Nueva Argentina	2013	2017
Buenos Aires		Carlos Américo Selva	Federal Unidos por una Nueva Argentina	2015	2019
Buenos Aires		Felipe Carlos Solá	Federal Unidos por una Nueva Argentina	2013	2017
Buenos Aires		Margarita Rosa Stolbizer	Generación para un Encuentro Nacional	2013	2017
Buenos Aires		Luis Rodolfo Tailhade	Frente para la Victoria-PJ	2015	2019
Buenos Aires		Pablo Torello	Unión PRO	2015	2019
Buenos Aires		Gabriela Alejandra Troiano	Partido Socialista	2013	2017
Buenos Aires		Mirta Tundis	Federal Unidos por una Nueva Argentina	2013	2017
Buenos Aires		Paula Marcela Urroz	Unión PRO	2015	2019
Buenos Aires		Luana Volnovich	Frente para la Victoria-PJ	2015	2019
Buenos Aires		Waldo Ezequiel Wolff	Unión PRO	2015	2019
Buenos Aires City		Alcira Susana Argumedo	Proyecto Sur	2013	2017
Buenos Aires City		Alicia Irma Besada	Unión PRO	2016 (Note: Since 1 March 2016. Replaced Laura Alonso after she resigned on 10 December 2015 to become President of the Oficina Anticorrupción.)	2017
Buenos Aires City		Juan Cabandié	Frente para la Victoria-PJ	2013	2017
Buenos Aires City		Elisa María Avelina Carrió	Coalición Cívica	2013	2017
Buenos Aires City		Ana Carla Carrizo	Unión Cívica Radical	2013	2017
Buenos Aires City		Eduardo Raúl Conesa	Unión PRO	2016 (Note: Since 1 March 2016. Replaced Federico Sturzenegger after he resigned on 10 December 2015 to become President of the Central Bank of Argentina.)	2017
Buenos Aires City		Victoria Analía Donda Pérez	Libres del Sur	2015	2019
Buenos Aires City		Nilda Celia Garré	Frente para la Victoria-PJ	2015	2019
Buenos Aires City		Álvaro Gustavo González	Unión PRO	2015	2019
Buenos Aires City		Carlos Salomón Heller	Solidario Sí	2013	2017
Buenos Aires City		Anabella Ruth Hers Cabral	Unión PRO	2015	2019
Buenos Aires City		Axel Kicillof	Frente para la Victoria-PJ	2015	2019
Buenos Aires City		Andrés Larroque	Frente para la Victoria-PJ	2015	2019
Buenos Aires City		Marco Lavagna	Federal Unidos por una Nueva Argentina	2015	2019
Buenos Aires City		María Paula Lopardo	Unión PRO	2016 (Note: Since 1 March 2016. Replaced Jorge Triaca Jr. after he resigned on 10 December 2015 to become Ministry of Labour.)	2017
Buenos Aires City		Liliana Amalia Mazure	Frente para la Victoria-PJ	2013	2017
Buenos Aires City		José Luis Patiño	Unión PRO	2016 (Note: Since 1 March 2016. Replaced Sergio Bergman after he resigned on 10 December 2015 to become Minister of Environment.)	2017
Buenos Aires City		Carla Betina Pitiot	Federal Unidos por una Nueva Argentina	2015	2019
Buenos Aires City		Julio Raffo	Diálogo y Trabajo	2016 (Note: Since 1 March 2016. Replaced Martín Lousteau after he resigned on 10 December 2015 to become Ambassador to the United States.)	2017
Buenos Aires City		Fernando Sánchez	Coalición Cívica	2013	2017
Buenos Aires City		Cornelia Schmidt-Liermann	Unión PRO	2015	2019
Buenos Aires City		Marcelo Adolfo Sorgente	Unión PRO	2016 (Note: Since 1 March 2016. Replaced Silvia Majdalani after she resigned on 10 December 2015 to become Sub Director-General of the Federal Intelligence Agency.)	2017
Buenos Aires City		Pablo Gabriel Tonelli	Unión PRO	2015	2019
Buenos Aires City		Juan Carlos Villalonga	Unión PRO	2015	2019
Buenos Aires City		Marcelo Germán Wechsler	Unión PRO	2015	2019
Catamarca		Eduardo Segundo Brizuela del Moral	Frente Cívico y Social de Catamarca	2013	2017
Catamarca		Myrian del Valle Juárez	Frente Cívico y Social de Catamarca	2013	2017
Catamarca		Véronica Mercado	Frente para la Victoria-PJ	2015	2019
Catamarca		Amado '''Quintar'''	Frente Cívico y Social de Catamarca	2015	2016 (Note: Died on 12 December 2016. Replaced by Orieta Cecilia Vera González on 22 December 2016.)
Catamarca		Néstor Nicolás Tomassi	Justicialista	2013	2017
Catamarca		Orieta Cecilia Vera González	Coalición Cívica	2016 (Note: Since 22 December 2016. Replaced Amado Quintar after his death on 12 December 2016.)	2019
Chaco		Horacio Goicoechea	Unión Cívica Radical	2015	2019
Chaco		Gustavo José Martínez Campos	Justicialista	2013	2017
Chaco		María Lucila Masin	Frente para la Victoria-PJ	2015	2019
Chaco		Sandra Marcela Mendoza	Frente para la Victoria-PJ	2013	2017
Chaco		Juan Manuel Pedrini	Frente para la Victoria-PJ	2013	2017
Chaco		Analía Rach Quiroga	Frente para la Victoria-PJ	2015	2019
Chaco		Alicia Terada	Coalición Cívica	2013	2017
Chubut		Sixto Osvaldo Bermejo	Trabajo y Dignidad	2016 (Note: Since 1 March 2016. Replaced Mario das Neves after he resigned on 10 December 2015 to become Governor of Chubut.)	2017
Chubut		Santiago Nicolás Igon	Frente para la Victoria-PJ	2015	2019
Chubut		Elia Nelly Lagoria	Trabajo y Dignidad	2013	2017
Chubut		Ana Llanos	Frente para la Victoria-PJ	2015	2019
Chubut		Jorge Taboada	Chubut Somos Todos	2015	2019
Córdoba		Brenda Lis Austin	Unión Cívica Radical	2016 (Note: Since 18 May 2016. Replaced Gerardo Bellocq after his death on 27 April 2016.)	2017
Córdoba		Héctor Baldassi	Unión PRO	2013	2017
Córdoba		Gerardo Bellocq	Unión Cívica Radical	2016 (Note: Since 1 March 2016. Replaced Oscar Aguad after he resigned on 10 December 2015 to become Minister of Communications.)	2016 (Note: Died on 27 April 2016 in a car crash. Replaced by Brenda Lis Austin on 18 May 2016.)
Córdoba		Ramón Ernesto Bernabey	Brigadier General Juan Bautista Bustos	2013	2017
Córdoba		María Eugenia Brezzo	Unidos por una Nueva Argentina	2016 (Note: Since 1 March 2016. Replaced Carlos Alberto Caserio after he resigned on 10 December 2015 to become Senator.)	2017
Córdoba		Juan Fernando Brügge	Unidos por una Nueva Argentina	2015	2019
Córdoba		Agustín Santiago Calleri	Unidos por una Nueva Argentina	2016 (Note: Since 1 March 2016. Replaced Juan Schiaretti after he resigned on 10 December 2015 to become Governor of Córdoba.)	2017
Córdoba		María Soledad Carrizo	Unión Cívica Radical	2013	2017
Córdoba		Gabriela Beatriz Estévez	Frente para la Victoria-PJ	2015	2019
Córdoba		Andrés Ernesto Guzmán	Brigadier General Juan Bautista Bustos	2016 (Note: Since 1 March 2016. Replaced Martín Gill after he resigned on 10 December 2015 to become mayor of Villa María.)	2017
Córdoba		Leonor María Martínez Villada	Coalición Cívica	2015	2019
Córdoba		Nicolás María Massot	Unión PRO	2015	2019
Córdoba		Diego Matías Mestre	Unión Cívica Radical	2013	2017
Córdoba		Adriana Mónica Nazario	Unidos por una Nueva Argentina	2015	2019
Córdoba		Mario Raúl Negri	Unión Cívica Radical	2015	2019
Córdoba		Juan Manuel Pereyra	Concertación-FORJA	2015	2019
Córdoba		Pedro Javier Pretto	Unión PRO	2015	2019
Córdoba		Olga María Rista	Unión Cívica Radical	2015	2019
Córdoba		Blanca Araceli Rossi	Unidos por una Nueva Argentina	2013	2017
Corrientes		Julián Dindart	Unión Cívica Radical	2015	2019
Corrientes		Araceli Ferreyra	Peronismo para la Victoria	2015	2019
Corrientes		Oscar Alberto Macias	Justicialista	2015	2019
Corrientes		Carlos Gustavo Rubín	Justicialista	2013	2017
Corrientes		José Arnaldo Ruiz Aragón	Frente para la Victoria-PJ	2015	2019
Corrientes		María de las Mercedes Semhan	Unión Cívica Radical	2013	2017
Corrientes		Gustavo Adolfo Valdés	Unión Cívica Radical	2013	2017
Entre Ríos		Jorge Rubén Barreto	Frente para la Victoria-PJ	2013	2017
Entre Ríos		María Cristina Cremer de Busti	Unión por Entre Ríos	2013	2017
Entre Ríos		Jorge Marcelo D'Agostino	Unión Cívica Radical	2013	2017
Entre Ríos		Ana Carolina Gaillard	Frente para la Victoria-PJ	2013	2017
Entre Ríos		Yanina Celeste Gayol	Unión PRO	2015	2019
Entre Ríos		Lautaro Gervasoni	Frente para la Victoria-PJ	2013	2017
Entre Ríos		Juan Manuel Huss	Frente para la Victoria-PJ	2015	2019
Entre Ríos		Marcelo Alejandro Monfort	Unión Cívica Radical	2015	2019
Entre Ríos		Julio Rodolfo Solanas	Frente para la Victoria-PJ	2015	2019
Formosa		Luis Eugenio Basterra	Frente para la Victoria-PJ	2015	2019
Formosa		Juan Carlos Díaz Roig	Frente para la Victoria-PJ	2013	2017
Formosa		Lucila Beatriz Duré	Partido Socialista	2016 (Note: Since 1 March 2016. Replaced Ricardo Buryaile after he resigned on 10 December 2015 to become Minister of Agro-industry.)	2017
Formosa		Martín Osvaldo Hernández	Unión Cívica Radical	2015	2019
Formosa		Inés Beatriz Lotto	Frente para la Victoria-PJ	2015	2019
Jujuy		Gabriela Romina Albornoz	Unión Cívica Radical	2016 (Note: Since 1 March 2016. Replaced Mario Fiad after he resigned on 10 December 2015.)	2017
Jujuy		María Gabriela Burgos	Unión Cívica Radical	2013	2017
Jujuy		Silvia Alejandra Martínez	Unión Cívica Radical	2015	2019
Jujuy		Alejandro Francisco Snopek	Federal Unidos por una Nueva Argentina	2015	2019
Jujuy		Guillermo Snopek	Justicialista	2015	2017 (Note: Resigned on 9 December 2017 to become national senator. Replaced by María Carolina Moisés.)
Jujuy		Héctor Olindo Tentor	Justicialista	2013	2017
La Pampa		Gustavo Rodolfo Fernández Mendia	Justicialista	2013	2017
La Pampa		Daniel Ricardo Kroneberger	Unión Cívica Radical	2015	2019
La Pampa		Martín Maquieyra	Unión PRO	2016 (Note: Since 1 March 2016. Replaced Carlos Mac Allister after he resigned on 10 December 2015 to become Secretary of Sports.)	2017
La Pampa		Francisco Javier Torroba	Unión Cívica Radical	2013	2017
La Pampa		Sergio Raúl Ziliotto	Justicialista	2015	2019
La Rioja		Luis Beder Herrera	Justicialista	2015	2019
La Rioja		Teresita Madera	Justicialista	2013	2017
La Rioja		Karina Alejandra Molina	Unión PRO	2015	2019
La Rioja		Héctor Enrique Olivares	Unión Cívica Radical	2015	2019
La Rioja		María Clara del Valle Vega	Unión Cívica Radical	2016 (Note: Since 1 March 2016. Replaced Julio Martínez after he resigned on 10 December 2015 to become Minister of Defense.)	2017
Mendoza		Alejandro Abraham	Frente para la Victoria-PJ	2013	2017
Mendoza		Elva Susana Balbo	Unión PRO	2015	2019
Mendoza		Luis Gustavo Borsani	Unión Cívica Radical	2015	2019
Mendoza		Guillermo Ramón Carmona	Frente para la Victoria-PJ	2015	2019
Mendoza		Graciela Cousinet	Libres del Sur	2016 (Note: Since 1 March 2016. Replaced Julio Cobos after he resigned on 10 December 2015 to become Senator.)	2017
Mendoza		Patricia Viviana Giménez	Unión Cívica Radical	2013	2017
Mendoza		Stella Maris Huczak	Unión PRO	2016 (Note: Since 1 March 2016. Replaced Enrique Vaquié after he did not assume to become Minister of Economy of Mendoza.)	2019
Mendoza		Pedro Rubén Miranda	Justicialista	2015	2019
Mendoza		Luis Alfonso Petri	Unión Cívica Radical	2013	2017
Mendoza		Soledad Sosa	Frente de Izquierda y de los Trabajadores	2013	2017
Misiones		María Cristina Britez	Frente para la Victoria-PJ	2015	2019
Misiones		Maurice Fabián Closs	Frente de la Concordia Misionero	2015	2017 (Note: Resigned on 9 December 2017 to become national senator. Replaced by Verónica Derna.)
Misiones		Daniel di Stefano	Frente para la Victoria-PJ	2015	2019
Misiones		Jorge Daniel Franco	Frente de la Concordia Misionero	2015	2019
Misiones		Luis Mario Pastori	Unión Cívica Radical	2013	2017
Misiones		Silvia Lucrecia Risko	Frente de la Concordia Misionero	2013	2017
Misiones		Alex Roberto Ziegler	Libertad, Valores y Cambio	2013	2017
Neuquén		José Alberto Ciampini	Frente para la Victoria-PJ	2015	2019
Neuquén		Leandro Gastón López Koenig	Unión PRO	2015	2019
Neuquén		Norman Darío Martínez	Frente para la Victoria-PJ	2016 (Note: Since 1 March 2016. Replaced Nanci Parrilli after she resigned on 10 December 2015.)	2017
Neuquén		Adrián San Martín	Movimiento Popular Neuquino	2013	2017
Neuquén		María Ines Villar Molina	Movimiento Popular Neuquino	2013	2017
Río Negro		Luis María Bardeggia	Frente para la Victoria-PJ	2013	2017
Río Negro		Claudio Martín Doñate	Frente para la Victoria-PJ	2015	2019
Río Negro		Silvia Renee Horne	Peronismo para la Victoria	2016 (Note: Since 1 March 2016.)	2019
Río Negro		María Emilia Soria	Frente para la Victoria-PJ	2013	2017
Río Negro		Sergio Javier Wisky	Unión PRO	2015	2019
Salta		Néstor Javier David	Justicialista	2015	2019
Salta		Guillermo Mario Durand Cornejo	Unión PRO	2013	2017
Salta		Evita Nélida Isa	Justicialista	2013	2017
Salta		Pablo Francisco Juan Kosiner	Justicialista	2015	2019
Salta		Pablo Sebastián López	Frente de Izquierda y de los Trabajadores	2013	2017
Salta		Miguel Nanni	Unión Cívica Radical	2015	2019
Salta		Alfredo Horacio Olmedo	Salta Somos Todos	2015	2019
San Juan		Eduardo Augusto Cáceres	Unión PRO	2013	2017
San Juan		Graciela María Caselles	Partido Bloquista de San Juan	2015	2019
San Juan		Sandra Daniela Castro	Frente para la Victoria-PJ	2013	2017
San Juan		José Luis Gioja	Frente para la Victoria-PJ	2015	2019
San Juan		María Florencia Peñaloza Marianetti	Compromiso con San Juan	2015	2019
San Juan		Ramón Alberto Tovares	Frente para la Victoria-PJ	2013	2017
San Luis		Berta Hortensia Arenas	Compromiso Federal	2013	2017
San Luis		Ivana María Bianchi	Compromiso Federal	2015	2019
San Luis		Ramón Alfredo Domínguez	Compromiso Federal	2017 (Note: Since 5 July 2017. Replaced Luis Lusquiños after his death on 17 June 2017.)	2017
San Luis		Claudio Javier Poggi	Avanzar San Luis	2015	2017 (Note: Resigned on 9 December 2017 to become national senator. Replaced by Andrés Alberto Vallone.)
San Luis		José Luis Riccardo	Unión Cívica Radical	2013	2017
San Luis		Luis Bernardo Lusquiños	Compromiso Federal	2016 (Note: Since 1 March 2016. Replaced Fernando Salino after he resigned on 10 December 2015.)	2017 (Note: Died on 17 June 2017. Replaced by Ramón Alfredo Domínguez on 5 July 2017.)
Santa Cruz		Eduardo Raúl Costa	Unión Cívica Radical	2013	2017
Santa Cruz		Mauricio Ricardo Gómez Bull	Frente para la Victoria-PJ	2013	2017
Santa Cruz		Máximo Carlos Kirchner	Frente para la Victoria-PJ	2015	2019
Santa Cruz		Héctor Alberto Roquel	Unión Cívica Radical	2015	2019
Santa Cruz		Susana María Toledo	Unión Cívica Radical	2013	2017
Santa Fe		Mario Domingo Barletta	Unión Cívica Radical	2013	2017
Santa Fe		Hermes Juan Binner	Partido Socialista	2013	2017
Santa Fe		Alicia Mabel Ciciliani	Partido Socialista	2013	2017
Santa Fe		Marcos Cleri	Frente para la Victoria-PJ	2015	2019
Santa Fe		Ana Isabel Copes	Partido Demócrata Progresista	2016 (Note: Since 1 March 2016. Replaced Pablo Javkin after he resigned on 10 December 2015 to become Secretary General of Rosario.)	2017
Santa Fe		Lucila María de Ponti	Peronismo para la Victoria	2015	2019
Santa Fe		Silvina Patricia Frana	Frente para la Victoria-PJ	2015	2019
Santa Fe		Josefina Victoria González	Frente para la Victoria-PJ	2013	2017
Santa Fe		Alejandro Ariel Grandinetti	Federal Unidos por una Nueva Argentina	2015	2019
Santa Fe		Lucas Ciriaco Incicco	Unión PRO	2015	2019
Santa Fe		Luciano Andrés Laspina	Unión PRO	2013	2017
Santa Fe		Hugo María Marcucci	Unión Cívica Radical	2015	2019
Santa Fe		Ana Laura Martínez	Unión PRO	2015	2017 (Note: Resigned on 9 December 2017 to become councilwoman of Rosario. Replaced by Astrid Hummel.)
Santa Fe		Vanesa Laura Massetani	Federal Unidos por una Nueva Argentina	2015	2019
Santa Fe		José Carlos Núñez	Unión PRO	2015	2019
Santa Fe		Alejandro Ramos	Frente para la Victoria-PJ	2015	2019
Santa Fe		Gisela Scaglia	Unión PRO	2013	2017
Santa Fe		Eduardo Jorge Seminara	Frente para la Victoria-PJ	2013	2017
Santa Fe		Ricardo Adrián Spinozzi	Unión PRO	2013	2017
Santiago del Estero		Norma Amanda Abdala de Matarazzo	Frente Cívico por Santiago	2013	2017
Santiago del Estero		José Alberto Herrera	Frente Cívico por Santiago	2015	2017 (Note: Resigned on 15 November 2017 to become mayor of Clodomira. Replaced by Estela Mary Neder on 22 November 2017.)
Santiago del Estero		Manuel Humberto Juárez	Frente Cívico por Santiago	2013	2017
Santiago del Estero		Mariana Elizabet Morales	Federal Unidos por una Nueva Argentina	2015	2019
Santiago del Estero		Graciela Navarro	Frente Cívico por Santiago	2015	2019
Santiago del Estero		Cristian Rodolfo Oliva	Frente Cívico por Santiago	2013	2017
Santiago del Estero		Mirta Ameliana Pastoriza	Frente Cívico por Santiago	2015	2019
Tierra del Fuego		Analuz Ailen Carol	Frente para la Victoria-PJ	2015	2019
Tierra del Fuego		Oscar Anselmo Martínez	Movimiento Solidario Popular	2013	2017
Tierra del Fuego		Martín Alejandro Pérez	Frente para la Victoria-PJ	2013	2017
Tierra del Fuego		Matías David Rodríguez	Frente para la Victoria-PJ	2015	2019
Tierra del Fuego		Carlos Gastón Roma	Unión PRO	2015	2019
Tucumán		Nilda Mabel Carrizo	Frente para la Victoria-PJ	2013	2017
Tucumán		Juan Francisco Casañas	Del Bicentenario	2013	2017
Tucumán		Miriam Graciela Gallardo	Frente para la Victoria-PJ	2013	2017
Tucumán		Facundo Garretón	Unión PRO	2015	2019
Tucumán		Federico Augusto Masso	Libres del Sur	2016 (Note: Since 1 March 2016. Replaced José Manuel Cano after he resigned on 10 December 2015 to become Director of the Plan Belgrano.)	2017
Tucumán		José Fernando Orellana	Primero Tucumán	2015	2019
Tucumán		Walter Marcelo Santillan	Frente para la Victoria-PJ	2015	2019
Tucumán		Mirta Alicia Soraire	Frente para la Victoria-PJ	2015	2019
Tucumán		María Teresita Villavicencio	Del Bicentenario	2015	2019

== See also ==
- List of current Argentine senators
