= Liliana Schwindt =

Argentine journalist and politician

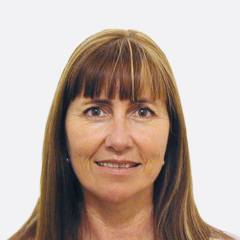

National Deputy
- In office 12 February 2020 – 10 December 2021
- Constituency: Buenos Aires
- In office 10 December 2013 – 10 December 2017
- Constituency: Buenos Aires

Personal details
- Born: 13 May 1963 (age 62) Olavarría, Argentina
- Party: Justicialist Party (until 2013); Renewal Front (since 2013)
- Other political affiliations: United for a New Alternative (2015–2017); 1País (2017–2019); Frente de Todos (2019–present)

María Liliana Schwindt (born 13 May 1963) is an Argentine politician who served as a National Deputy elected in Buenos Aires Province on two occasions: she was first elected in 2013, and ran for re-election in 2017, as part of the 1País list, but was not elected. She assumed office in February 2020 in replacement of Felipe Solá. She is a member of the Renewal Front.

== Early and personal life ==
Schwindt was born on 13 May 1963 in Olavarría, a city in Central Buenos Aires Province. She studied to be a Social Assistant at the Escuela Superior de Sanidad in La Plata, graduating in 1985. She also has a licenciatura in Social Work from the University of Morón. She has one child.

== Political career ==
Schwindt's political career began in the Justicialist Party (PJ). She served in a number of posts in the Buenos Aires PJ, such as Secretary of Women's Affairs from 1995 to 1999, Secretary of Institutional Affairs in 1999, and as member of the party's Provincial Congress. From 1995 to 2002, she served as Under-director of Financial and Ownership Regularization of Housing Complexes in the Provincial Institute of Housing. Later, from 2002 to 2005, she was an aide at the Chamber of Deputies of Argentina. In 2005, she was elected to the City Council of Olavarría, serving until 2009.

Ahead of the 2013 legislative election, Schwindt broke away from the Justicialist Party and joined the Renewal Front, led by Sergio Massa. She ran for a seat in the Chamber of Deputies in Buenos Aires Province as the 15th candidate in the Renewal Front list, which was the most voted with 43.95% of the popular vote, enough for Schwindt to be elected.

Schwindt ran for re-election in 2017, this time the fifth candidate in the 1País list (of which the Renewal Front was part). The list received 11.03%, not enough for Schwindt to be elected. Following the 2019 general election, in which Alberto Fernández was elected president of Argentina, 1País deputy Felipe Solá was appointed Foreign Minister and Schwindt embarked in a legal battle to take his seat. The Electoral Justice agreed with Schwindt, and she was sworn in as deputy on 12 February 2020, as part of the Frente de Todos parliamentary bloc.

During her second term as deputy, Schwindt formed part of the parliamentary commissions on Consumer Rights, Social Assistance, Agriculture and Livestock, Commerce, and Mining. She was a supporter of the legalization of abortion in Argentina, voting in favour of the 2020 Voluntary Interruption of Pregnancy bills that passed the Argentine Congress.
