= Mirta Tundis =

Argentine journalist and politician

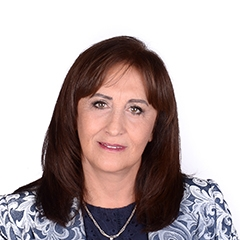

National Deputy
- In office 10 December 2013 – 10 December 2021
- Constituency: Buenos Aires

Personal details
- Born: 7 September 1956 (age 70) Buenos Aires, Argentina
- Party: Renewal Front
- Other political affiliations: United for a New Alternative (2015–2017); 1País (2017–2019); Frente de Todos (2019–present)
- Profession: Journalist, politician

Mirta Tundis (born 7 September 1956) is an Argentine journalist and politician who served as a National Deputy elected in Buenos Aires Province. A member of the Renewal Front, she was first elected in 2013 and re-elected in 2017.

== Early and personal life ==
Tundis was born on 7 September 1956 in Buenos Aires, to a family of Italian descent, and grew up in Villa Insuperable, a working-class neighbourhood in La Tablada, Buenos Aires Province. She was married from 1974 to 1994; Tundis has been open about her experiences with gender-based violence at the hands of her (now deceased) ex-husband. She has two children.

== Journalism career ==
Tundis' career in journalism began in the 1990s. Despite her lack of higher studies, she specialized in pensioners' affairs with segments in Canal 13 and TN. She would later anchor the segment Mirta Móvil, where she interviewed passersby in public squares on pensioners' issues. Tundis worked at Radio Mitre from 2003 to 2007, and in 2008, she began hosting her own programme, Mirta te Acompaña, in Cablevisión's Metro channel.

== Political career ==
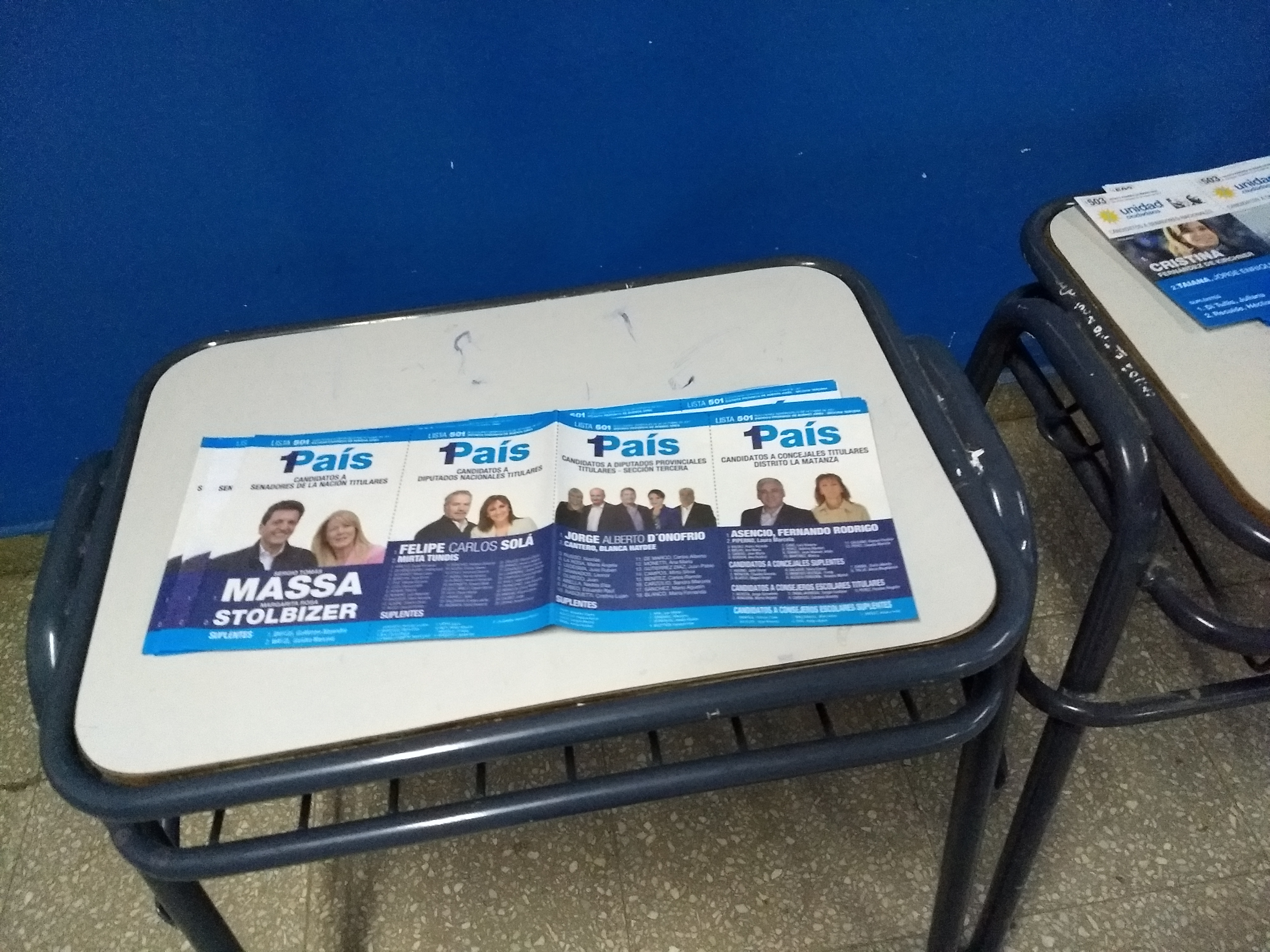
1País lists in the 2017 legislative election, with Tundis as the second candidate to the Chamber of Deputies, behind Felipe Solá.

Tundis was chief of press in the Comprehensive Medical Attention Program (PAMI) from 1994 to 2013. Ahead of the 2013 legislative election, Tundis was selected was the second candidate to the Argentine Chamber of Deputies in the Renewal Front list in Buenos Aires Province, behind Renewal Front leader Sergio Massa. The list was the most voted in the province, with 43.95% of the vote, and Tundis was easily elected. She was sworn in on 10 December 2013. Tundis was re-elected in 2017, this time the second candidate in the 1País list (of which the Renewal Front was part). The list received 11.03%, enough for Tundis to be elected.

As a national deputy, Tundis formed part of the parliamentary commissions on Population and Human Development, Disabilities, Analysis of Tax Normatives, and Elderly People. She was a supporter of the legalization of abortion in Argentina. She voted in favor of the two Voluntary Interruption of Pregnancy bills that were debated by the Argentine Congress in 2018 and 2020.

In the aftermath of the 2019 general election, Tundis, alongside the rest of the Renewal Front, joined the Frente de Todos parliamentary bloc.
