= Galmarini =

Galmarini is an Italian surname. Notable people with the surname include:

- Anna Galmarini (1942–1997), Italian figure skater
- Malena Galmarini (born 1975), Argentine political scientist and politician
- Martín Galmarini (born 1982), Argentine footballer
- Nevin Galmarini (born 1986), Swiss snowboarder
