= Vanesa Massetani =

Argentine politician

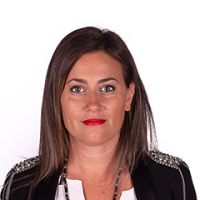

National Deputy
- Incumbent
- Assumed office 10 December 2015
- Constituency: Santa Fe

Personal details
- Born: 3 March 1982 (age 44) Casilda, Argentina
- Party: Renewal Front
- Other political affiliations: United for a New Alternative (2015–2017); Frente de Todos (2019–present)
- Education: Argentine Catholic University

Vanesa Laura Massetani (born 3 March 1982) is an Argentine politician, currently serving as National Deputy elected in Santa Fe Province. A member of the Renewal Front, she was elected in 2015 and re-elected in 2019 as part of the Frente de Todos.

== Early and personal life ==
Massetani was born on 3 March 1982 in Casilda, Santa Fe Province. She studied law at the Rosario campus of the Pontifical Catholic University of Argentina, graduating in 2009. She is married and has one child.

== Political career ==
Massetani became active in politics as part of the Renewal Front, led by Sergio Massa. She participated in the mayoral campaign of Alejandro Grandinetti in Rosario in the 2015 local election. Later that year, in the 2015 legislative election, she ran for a seat in the Argentine Chamber of Deputies as the second candidate in the United for a New Alternative list in Santa Fe Province, behind Grandinetti himself. The list came third with 21.97% of the vote, and Massetani was elected.

Massetani was re-elected in the 2019 legislative election, this time running as the fourth candidate in the Frente de Todos list, which received 42.26% of the vote.

As a national deputy, Massetani formed part of the parliamentary commissions on Freedom of Expression, Addiction Prevention, Political Trials, Criminal Legislation, Justice, and Constitutional Affairs. She was an opponent of the legalization of abortion in Argentina. She voted against the two Voluntary Interruption of Pregnancy bills that were debated by the Argentine Congress in 2018 and 2020.
