= Malena Galmarini =

Argentine politician

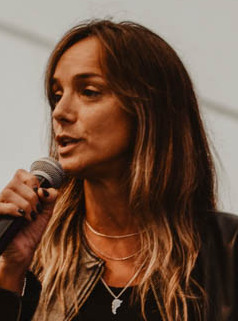

President of AySA
- In office 12 December 2019 – 21 December 2023
- Preceded by: José Luis Inglese
- Succeeded by: Marcelo Papandrea

Provincial Deputy of Buenos Aires
- In office 10 December 2019 – 12 December 2019
- Constituency: First Electoral Section

Personal details
- Born: 5 May 1975 (age 51) San Isidro, Buenos Aires, Argentina
- Party: Renewal Front (since 2013)
- Other political affiliations: United for a New Alternative (2015–2017); 1País (2017); Frente de Todos (2019–present)
- Spouse: Sergio Massa (m. 2001)
- Education: Universidad de Belgrano

Malena Galmarini (born 5 May 1975) is an Argentine political scientist and politician. She served as the president of Agua y Saneamientos Argentinos, a state-owned company dedicated to supplying the public with running water and sewer services, from 2019 to 2023. She previously served as a councilwoman in Tigre Partido from 2009 to 2019, and as Secretary of Health Policies and Human Development of Tigre from 2008 to 2017.

Galmarini is married to Sergio Massa, former Tigre mayor and former Minister of Economy of Argentina under the government of President Alberto Fernández.

== Early life and education ==
Galmarini was born on 5 May 1975 in San Isidro, Buenos Aires, into a political family. Her mother, Marcela Durrieu, was a national deputy for the Justicialist Party, while her father, Fernando Galmarini, served as secretary of sports of Argentina during the presidency of Carlos Menem. She has two brothers: Sebastián (born 1978), a fellow politician and member of the provincial senate, and Martín (born 1982), a professional football player in Club Atlético Tigre.

She studied political science at the Universidad de Belgrano, graduating with a licenciatura degree.

== Political career ==
Galmarini became a member of the Justicialist Party aged 18. In 1998, she was appointed as undersecretary of youth affairs at the Ministry of Health and Social Action.

In 2008, Galmarini was appointed Secretary of Health Policies and Human Development of Tigre Partido, during the mayorship of Julio Zamora. Later, in 2009, she was elected to the City Council of Tigre on the Front for Victory list. She was re-elected in 2013 as part of the Renewal Front, the party founded by her husband, Sergio Massa. Galmarini remained in her position as secretary of health in the Tigre municipal government during Massa's mayorship.

In the 2019 provincial elections, Galmarini was elected to the Buenos Aires Province Chamber of Deputies as part of the Frente de Todos list in the First Electoral Section. She was sworn in on 10 December 2019, however, the incoming government of Alberto Fernández announced she would be the new president of Agua y Saneamientos Argentinos (AySA) starting on 12 December 2019. She is the first woman to hold the position.

== Personal life ==
Galmarini is married to Sergio Massa, a fellow politician who has served in a number of important positions, such as mayor of Tigre, Cabinet Chief during the presidency of Cristina Fernández de Kirchner, and president of the National Chamber of Deputies. Galmarini and Massa met in 1996, and married in 2001. The couple have two children.

Galmarini was a vocal supporter of the legalisation of abortion in Argentina. National media highlighted her role within the government to support the measure.
