= Mónica Litza =

Argentine politician

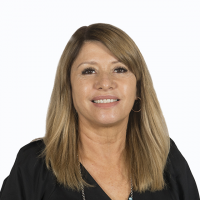

National Deputy
- Incumbent
- Assumed office 10 December 2021
- Constituency: Buenos Aires
- In office 1 March 2016 – 10 December 2017
- Constituency: Buenos Aires

Provincial Senator of Buenos Aires
- In office 10 December 2003 – 10 December 2007
- Constituency: Third Electoral Section

Personal details
- Born: 2 April 1961 (age 65) Avellaneda, Argentina
- Party: Justicialist Party (until 2013); Renewal Front (since 2013)
- Other political affiliations: Front for Victory (2003–2013); United for a New Alternative (2015–2017); 1País (2017); Red por Argentina (2018); Frente de Todos (2019–present)
- Education: Universidad de Belgrano

Mónica Edith Litza (born 2 April 1961) is an Argentine politician currently serving as a National Deputy elected in Buenos Aires Province. Litza previously held the position from 2016 to 2017. She was a member of the Senate of Buenos Aires from 2003 to 2007 and of the Avellaneda City Council from 2015 to 2019.

Formerly a member of the Justicialist Party, Litza was one of the founding members of the Renewal Front, a dissident peronist alliance formed by Sergio Massa. In addition to her elected posts, she has also served as head of the National Directorate for Recidivism from 2008 to 2013, and as Vice President of Correo Argentino from 2019 to 2021.

== Early life and education ==
Litza was born on 2 April 1961 in Avellaneda, a port city in the Greater Buenos Aires conurbation. She studied law at the Universidad de Belgrano, and has a doctorate in Political Science from the Pontifical Catholic University of Argentina (UCA).

== Political career ==
In 2003, Litza was elected to the Senate of Buenos Aires Province as part of the Justicialist Party list in the Third Electoral Section. In 2008, she was appointed as head of the National Directorate for Recidivism (Spanish: Dirección Nacional de Reincidencia), an agency within the Ministry of Justice and Human Rights of Argentina.

Ahead of the 2013 legislative election, Litza broke away from the Justicialist Party and joined the Renewal Front, led by Sergio Massa. She ran for a seat in the Chamber of Deputies in Buenos Aires Province as the 18th candidate in the Renewal Front list, which was the most voted list in the province, with 43.95% of the popular vote, but still did not receive enough votes for Litza to make it past the D'Hondt cut.

In 2015, she ran for and won a seat in the Avellaneda City Council as part of the Renewal Front list. In March 2016, PRO deputy Christian Gribaudo (who had run in the Renewal Front list in 2013) resigned from his seat to take up a post in the Buenos Aires provincial government, and Litza filled in his vacancy.

She initially intended to run for mayor of Avellaneda in the 2019 election, but later declined her candidacy when the Renewal Front joined other sectors of Peronism in forming the Frente de Todos (FDT), which backed the re-election campaign of incumbent Jorge Ferraresi. In January 2020, she was appointed Vice President of Correo Argentino.

In the 2021 legislative election, Litza once again ran for a seat in the Chamber of Deputies, now as the 11th candidate in the FDT list. With 38.59% of the vote, the FDT received enough votes for Litza to be elected. She was sworn in on 7 December 2021.

== Electoral history ==
Electoral history of Mónica Litza
Election	Office	List	#	District	Votes			Result	Ref.
Election	Office	List	#	District	Total	%	P.	Result	Ref.
2003	Provincial Senator	Justicialist Party	9	Third Electoral Section	907,448	45.15%	1st (Note: Presented on an electoral list. The data shown represents the share of the vote the entire party/alliance received in that constituency.)	Elected	
2013	National Deputy	Renewal Front	18	Buenos Aires Province	3,943,056	43.95%	1st	Not elected (Note: Assumed office on 10 December 2019 following the resignation of Christian Gribaudo.)	
2015	Councillor	United for a New Alternative	1	Avellaneda Partido	31,448	14.52%	3rd	Elected	
2021	National Deputy	Frente de Todos	11	Buenos Aires Province	3,444,446	38.59%	2nd	Elected	
