= Marcela Fabiana Passo =

Argentinian politician

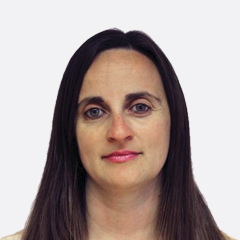

National Deputy
- Incumbent
- Assumed office 10 December 2021
- Constituency: Buenos Aires
- In office 10 December 2015 – 10 December 2019
- Constituency: Buenos Aires

Mayor of General Lavalle
- In office 10 December 2011 – 10 December 2015
- Preceded by: Guillermo Daniel Marchi
- Succeeded by: José Rodríguez Ponte

Personal details
- Born: 27 September 1976 (age 49) Dolores, Buenos Aires, Argentina
- Party: Victory Party (2007–2011); Renewal Front (since 2015)
- Other political affiliations: Front for Victory (2011–2015); United for a New Alternative (2015–2017); Frente de Todos (2019–2023); Union for the Homeland (since 2023)
- Occupation: Accountant

Marcela Fabiana Passo (born 27 September 1976) is an Argentine politician who is a member of the Chamber of Deputies of Argentina. Elected in Buenos Aires Province in 2021, she previously held the position from 2015 to 2019. She is a member of the Renewal Front.

From 2011 to 2015, she was intendenta (mayor) of General Lavalle Partido, the first woman to hold the position.

== Biography ==
Passo was born in Dolores, Buenos Aires Province. She studied to be an accountant.

== Electoral history ==
=== Executive ===
Electoral history of Marcela Fabiana Passo
Election	Office	List	Votes			Result	Ref.
Election	Office	List	Total	%	P.	Result	Ref.
2011	Mayor of General Lavalle	Front for Victory	1,289	52.27%	1st	Elected	

=== Legislative ===
Electoral history of Marcela Fabiana Passo
Election	Office	List	#	District	Votes			Result	Ref.
Election	Office	List	#	District	Total	%	P.	Result	Ref.
2007	School Councillor	Victory Party	1	General Lavalle Partido	1,281	61.06%	1st (Note: Presented on an electoral list. The data shown represents the share of the vote the entire party/alliance received in that constituency.)	Elected	
2009	Councillor	Justicialist Front for Victory	1	General Lavalle Partido	834	38.36%	1st	Elected	
2015	National Deputy	United for a New Alternative	5	Buenos Aires Province	1,888,415	28.98%	3rd	Elected	
2021	National Deputy	Frente de Todos	3	Buenos Aires Province	3,444,446	38.59%	2nd	Elected	
