= Cecilia Moreau =

Argentine politician (born 1976)

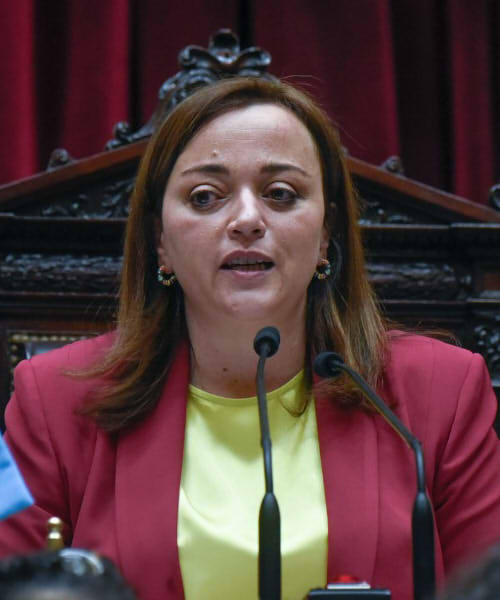
- Moreau in 2022

First Vice President of the Chamber of Deputies
- Incumbent
- Assumed office 10 December 2023
- Preceded by: Omar De Marchi

National Deputy
- Incumbent
- Assumed office 10 December 2015
- Constituency: Buenos Aires

President of the Chamber of Deputies
- In office 2 August 2022 – 10 December 2023
- Preceded by: Sergio Massa
- Succeeded by: Martín Menem

Provincial Deputy of Buenos Aires
- In office 10 August 2015 – 10 December 2015
- Constituency: First Electoral Section
- In office 10 December 2007 – 10 December 2011
- Constituency: First Electoral Section

Personal details
- Born: 5 December 1976 (age 49) Olivos, Argentina
- Party: Radical Civic Union (until 2014); Renewal Front (2014–present)
- Other political affiliations: United for a New Alternative (2015–2017); Frente de Todos (2019–2023); Union for the Homeland (since 2023)

Cecilia Moreau (Spanish pronunciation: [seˈsilja moˈɾo]; Buenos Aires, 5 December, 1976) is an Argentine politician, currently serving as National Deputy representing Buenos Aires Province since 2015, and as President of the Chamber of Deputies from 2022 to 2023. She is the first woman to hold that position. Previously, from 2007 to 2011 and again in 2015, Moreau served as a member of the Buenos Aires Province Chamber of Deputies elected in the First Electoral Section.

A longtime member of the Radical Civic Union (UCR), Moreau left and joined the Renewal Front in 2014. Since 2019, she has sat in the Frente de Todos parliamentary bloc in the Chamber of Deputies. She is the daughter of prominent UCR leader Leopoldo Moreau, a former President of the Chamber of Deputies.

== Early life ==
Cecilia Moreau was born on 5 December 1976 in Olivos, a suburb in the Greater Buenos Aires conurbation. She is the daughter of Leopoldo Moreau, a prominent Radical Civic Union leader who served as president of the Argentine Chamber of Deputies and as the UCR's presidential candidate in 2003. She has four siblings, one of which, Carmela, is also active in politics.

Moreau became politically involved from a young age. She followed her father's footsteps in joining the UCR, and in 2001, she was appointed secretary general of the Juventud Radical. From 2005 to 2008, she was secretary of political action in the Radical Committee of Buenos Aires Province.

== Political career ==
Moreau was elected to the Buenos Aires Province Chamber of Deputies at the 2007 provincial elections; she ran in the UCR list in the First Electoral Section. She finished her mandated in 2011, and later served in the Provincial Chamber briefly between August and December 2015.

Between 2012 and 2014, Moreau was secretary general of the Radical Civic Union committee in Buenos Aires Province. In 2014, she left the UCR and joined the Renewal Front, led by former Cabinet Chief Sergio Massa. Media attention centered around the apparent split between Moreau and her father, both of whom had defected the UCR, but to different parties.

=== National Deputy ===
At the 2015 general election, Moreau was the eighth candidate in the United for a New Alternative list to the Argentine Chamber of Deputies in Buenos Aires; the list received 20.98% of the vote, and Moreau was elected.

Moreau ran again for a second term in 2019, this time as the sixth candidate in the Frente de Todos list, following the agreement between the Renewal Front and other sectors of Peronism. The list received 51.64% of the vote, and Moreau was comfortably elected. Since 2020, she has been the vice president of the Frente de Todos parliamentary bloc in the Chamber, deputising for Máximo Kirchner.

On 2 August 2022, following the appointment of Sergio Massa as minister of economy, Moreau was elected to succeed him as president of the Chamber of Deputies. She became the first woman to ever hold the position. In addition, her election marked the first time that all authorities of the Argentine Congress were women (alongside Cristina Fernández de Kirchner as president of the Senate and Claudia Ledesma Abdala as provisional president of the Senate).

At the 2023 general election, she was re-elected to a third term as National Deputy for Buenos Aires Province as part of the Union for the Homeland (UP) list, where she was in 4th place. The list came first in the general election in Buenos Aires, with 43.7% of the vote, and she was easily re-elected. The UP candidate for president, Sergio Massa, was ultimately defeated by Javier Milei (LLA) in the November presidential run-off, and per convention Moreau was replaced by a deputy of Milei's party as president of the Chamber in the following legislature. On 7 December 2023, she was succeeded by Martín Menem.

== Personal life ==
Moreau was a vocal supporter of the legalisation of abortion in Argentina, and voted consistently in favour of the two Voluntary Interruption of Pregnancy bills, in 2018 and 2020. During the 2020 debate in the parliamentary commission on general legislation, Moreau spoke on how she carried out a clandestine abortion when she was 16, and how the experience motivated her to vote in favour of the bill.

Moreau was married to fellow politician Leandro Santoro, a political protegé of her father's. Santoro and Moreau have a daughter. Since 2021, Santoro has served in the Chamber of Deputies alongside both Moreaus.

== Electoral history ==
Electoral history of Cecilia Moreau
Election	Office	List	#	District	Votes			Result	Ref.
Election	Office	List	#	District	Total	%	P.	Result	Ref.
2007	Provincial Deputy	UNA Concertation	2	First Electoral Section	166,370	7.49%	3rd (Note: Presented on an electoral list. The data shown represents the share of the vote the entire party/alliance received in that constituency.)	Elected	
2011	Provincial Deputy	Union for Social Development	1 alt.	First Electoral Section	342,668	12.56%	2nd	Elected (Note: Took office on 10 August 2015, as a replacement for Fernando Rozas.)	
2015	National Deputy	United for a New Alternative	8	Buenos Aires Province	1,888,415	28.98%	3rd	Elected	
2019	National Deputy	Frente de Todos	6	Buenos Aires Province	5,113,359	52.64%	1st	Elected	
2023	National Deputy	Union for the Homeland	4	Buenos Aires Province	4,094,665	43.71%	1st	Elected	

Political offices
Preceded by Sergio Massa	President of the Chamber of Deputies; 2022–2023	Succeeded by Martín Menem
