= María Cristina Brítez =

Argentine politician and lawyer

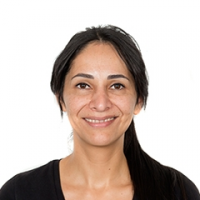

Member of the Chamber of Deputies of Argentina
- In office 10 December 2015 – 10 December 2023
- Constituency: Misiones

Personal details
- Born: 5 March 1981 (age 45)
- Relations: Frente de Todos
- Occupation: Lawyer

María Cristina Brítez is an Argentine politician who was a member of the Chamber of Deputies.

== Biography ==
Brítez worked as a lawyer before she was elected in 2019.

== See also ==
- List of Argentine deputies, 2015–2017
- List of Argentine deputies, 2017–2019
- List of Argentine deputies, 2019–2021
- List of Argentine deputies, 2021–2023
