= Claudia Rucci =

Argentine actress and politician

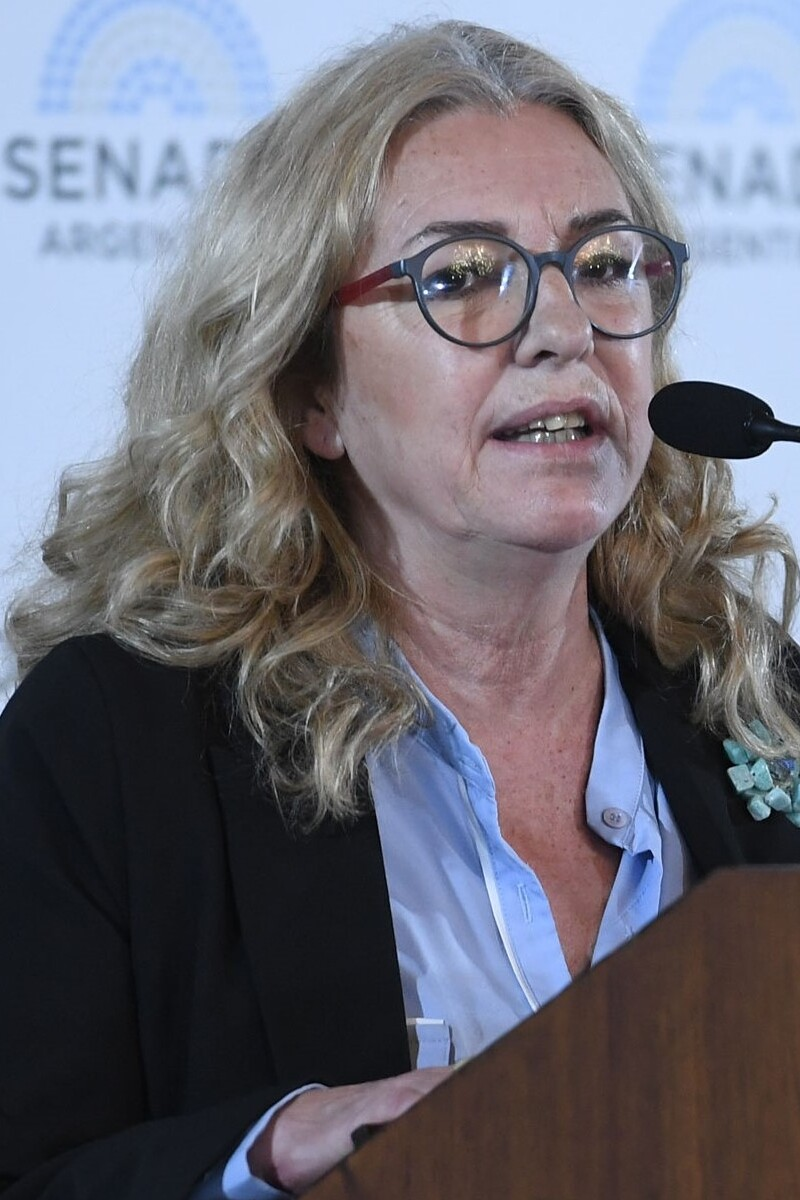
Claudia Rucci speaks in 2024.

Claudia Mónica Rucci (born December 19, 1963) is an Argentine actress and politician who served in the Argentine Chamber of Deputies from 2009 to 2013 and from 2015 to 2017, then in the Buenos Aires Province Senate from 2019 to 2023. In 2024, Vice President Victoria Villarruel appointed Rucci to lead the Senate's Human Rights Observatory, a position she held until 2025.

== Personal life ==
Claudia Rucci was born in Buenos Aires's Villa Soldati neighborhood in 1963. Her parents were Nélida Vaglio and the union leader José Ignacio Rucci, who was assassinated when she was 9 years old.

From 1982 to 2003, she was married to fellow actor Víctor Hugo Vieyra, with whom she had two children, María and Juan. She later married Gustavo Salischiker, with whom she had a son, Thiago.

== Acting ==
Rucci began acting in 1969, at age 6, on the TV show "Música en Libertad Infantil." She continued acting until 2003 on various telenovelas. She also co-founded a small theater in Castelar with her former husband.

== Politics ==
Rucci initially became involved in politics as part of the General Confederation of Labour in the early 2000s, serving under the union's Interior Secretary Gerónimo Venegas, and overseeing the normalization of the confederation's provincial branches.

From 2009 to 2013, she served in the Argentine Chamber of Deputies, elected as part of the center-right Unión-PRO alliance. During the 2009 election, the Front for Victory challenged her candidacy, arguing she did not have a registered residence in Buenos Aires Province. After Rucci presented evidence of her residence, a judge accepted her candidacy.

While in the legislature, she served as president of the Commission on Women, Family, Childhood, and Adolescence from 2009 to 2011. She lost her seat in the 2013 election.

In 2011, she ran a failed bid to become vice-governor of Buenos Aires Province, in tandem with Eduardo Duhalde's presidential candidacy. In the 2015 primary elections, she ran unsuccessfully for vice president alongside José Manuel de la Sota, under the banner United for a New Alternative. That year, she returned to the Chamber of Deputies, replacing Francisco de Narváez after he stepped down, and holding the seat until 2017.

In 2019, Rucci was elected to the Buenos Aires Province Senate as part of the Juntos por el Cambio coalition. Alongside Miguel Ángel Pichetto, Joaquín De la Torre, Juan Carlos Romero, and other politicians, in 2021 she formed the Peronist Encuentro Republicano Federal party, which sought to combat Cristina Fernández de Kirchner's Frente de Todos. She completed her provincial senate term in late 2023.

In January 2024, Vice President Victoria Villarruel appointed Rucci to lead the Senate's Human Rights Observatory. Rucci has supported Villarruel's controversial stance on "victims of terrorism" in Argentina, which weighs left-wing killings more heavily than the Argentine state's crimes against humanity during the Dirty War. She stepped down from the post in January 2025.

== Filmography ==
=== Television ===
Year	Title	Character
1972	Me llaman Gorrión	Paulina "Pochi" Morelli
1974-1975	Jacinta Pichimahuida, la maestra que no se olvida	Julia "Julita" Balmaceda
1975	No hace falta quererte	Nora "Norita" Frias
1976	El gato	Claudia Castro
1977	El cuarteador	Rosario "Rosarito" Morales
1977	El pícaro rebaño	Luciana Soria
1981	Gabriela	Gabriela Campos de Saavedra
1982	Crecer con papá	Ana Montivero
1982	Barata de primavera	Gabriela Cortés
1983	Humillados y ofendidos	Jazmín
1984	Mi hermana la Nena	Silvina Guzmán / Abigail Grimaldi
1986	El lobo	Gabriela
1987	Grecia	Paulina
1988	El mago	Natalia
1992	Corazones de fuego	Silvia Nicholson
1993	Dos al toque	Brianna Stone
1994	Alta comedia	Andrea "Ep: Volver a querer" Liliana "Ep: Poca cosa"
1994	Marco, el candidato	Beatriz Suárez
1996-1998	Verdad consecuencia	Valeria Heinrich
2011	Batallas de la Libertad	Narradora

=== Film ===
Year	Title	Character	Director
1981	Abierto día y noche	Margarita	Fernando Ayala
