= Martín Galmarini =

Argentine footballer

Personal information
- Full name: Martín Sebastián Galmarini Durrieu
- Date of birth: 28 February 1982 (age 44)
- Place of birth: San Isidro, Argentina
- Height: 1.80 m (5 ft 11 in)
- Position: Right-back

Youth career
- Tigre

Senior career*
Years	Team	Apps	(Gls)
2002–2008	Tigre	141	(13)
2008–2010	River Plate	23	(1)
2010–2013	Tigre	108	(5)
2013–2014	Atlante	28	(0)
2014–2022	Tigre	126	(1)
- * Club domestic league appearances and goals

Martín Galmarini (born 28 February 1982) is an Argentine former footballer who played as a right-back.

== Career ==
Born in San Isidro, Galmarini started his career with Tigre in 2002 while the club were playing in the regionalised 3rd division of Argentine football (Primera B Metropolitana).

Tigre had a very successful season in 2004-2005 winning both the Apertura and Clausura to secure automatic promotion to the 2nd Division. Two years later Tigre secured another promotion, returning to the top flight of Argentine football for the first time since 1980.

During the opening round of fixtures for the Apertura 2007 Galmarini scored Tigre's first goal in the Primera for 27 years in a 0–1 away win against Gimnasia y Esgrima La Plata. Tigre went on to finish in 2nd place, the highest league finish in the club's history, with Galmarini featuring in all 19 games.

At the end of Clausura 2008 Galmarini joined Argentine giants River Plate. However, he returned to Tigre for the 2010–11 Argentine Primera División season.

== Personal life ==
Galmarini's parents are active in politics in Buenos Aires Province as part of the Justicialist Party, as are his siblings, Sebastián and Malena.

== Honours ==
Season	Team	Title
Apertura 2004	Club Atlético Tigre	Primera B Metropolitana
Clausura 2005	Club Atlético Tigre	Primera B Metropolitana
