= Alcira Argumedo =

Argentine politician and academic (1940–2021)

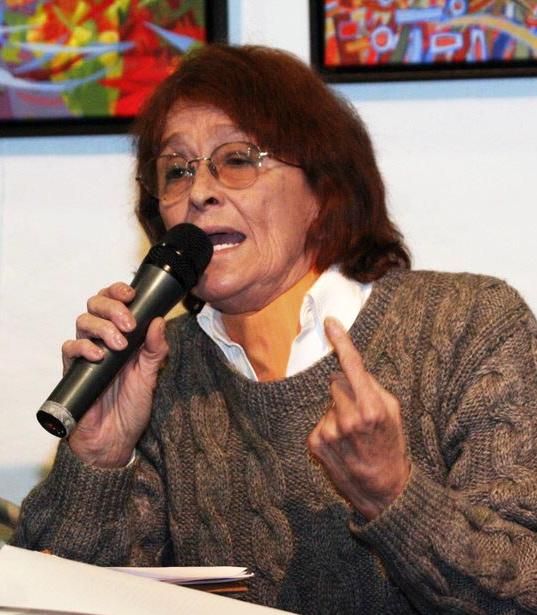

National Deputy
- In office 10 December 2009 – 10 December 2017
- Constituency: City of Buenos Aires

Personal details
- Born: 7 May 1940 Rosario, Santa Fe Province, Argentina
- Died: 2 May 2021 (aged 80) City of Buenos Aires
- Party: Proyecto Sur
- Education: University of Buenos Aires
- Profession: Sociologist

Alcira Susana Argumedo (7 May 1940 – 2 May 2021) was an Argentine sociologist, academic and was member of the Argentine Chamber of Deputies. She was nominated as a candidate for president on the Proyecto Sur ticket for the 2011 general elections.

== Life and times ==
Argumedo was born in Rosario in 1940. She enrolled at the University of Buenos Aires, and earned a degree in Sociology in 1965. She taught at her alma mater's Faculty of Philosophy and Letters between 1968 and 1974, and served as Secretary of Culture by Buenos Aires Province Governor Oscar Bidegain during his brief 1973-74 tenure. She continued to teach, and wrote numerous treatises on the impact of globalization in the Third World during the early 1970s.

The March 1976 coup and the subsequent Dirty War compelled Argumedo to leave Argentina in 1978, and she sought exile in Mexico. She worked in the Latin American Institute of Transnational Studies (ILET), published numerous articles for IPECAL, and served as adviser to Gabriel García Márquez and Juan Somavía in a discussion regarding New World Information and Communication Order hosted by UNESCO.

She returned to Argentina following elections in 1983, and in 1987, resumed her post in the University of Buenos Aires faculty and joined the National Research Council.

Argumedo was a founding member of a center-left political party, Frente Grande, in 1993, with Congressman Carlos Álvarez, film-maker Pino Solanas, human rights activist Graciela Fernández Meijide and others disaffected with President Carlos Menem's turn to the right.

She became a regular contributor to Página/12, and joined Nobel Peace Prize laureate Adolfo Pérez Esquivel and others in the Forum for Thought and Social Construction. Argumedo was named in 2005 to the board of directors of the Institute for the Site of Remembrance, which administers the largest former detention center used during the Dirty War as a museum.

Argumedo was among the co-founders in 2007 of Proyecto Sur, a leftist political party founded and led by Pino Solanas. She was elected to the Argentine Chamber of Deputies in 2009 for the City of Buenos Aires, and became part of the leadership in the Education Committee. Following Solanas' departure from the Socialist Party-led Progressive Front in June 2011, he nominated Argumedo as the Proyecto Sur candidate for president in the 2011 elections.

== Bibliography ==
- El Tercer Mundo: historia, problemas y perspectivas (CEAL, 1971).
- La socialización del poder y de la economía (1973)
- Monopolios y Tercer Mundo (CEAL, 1975), with Pablo Franco.
- Los laberintos de la crisis: América Latina: poder transnacional y comunicaciones (Folios/ILET, 1985).
- Un horizonte sin certezas: América Latina ante la Revolución Científico-Técnica. (Puntosur/Ilet, 1987).
- Los silencios y las voces en América Latina: notas sobre el pensamiento nacional y popular. (Colihue, 1993).
