= Gladys González =

Argentine politician

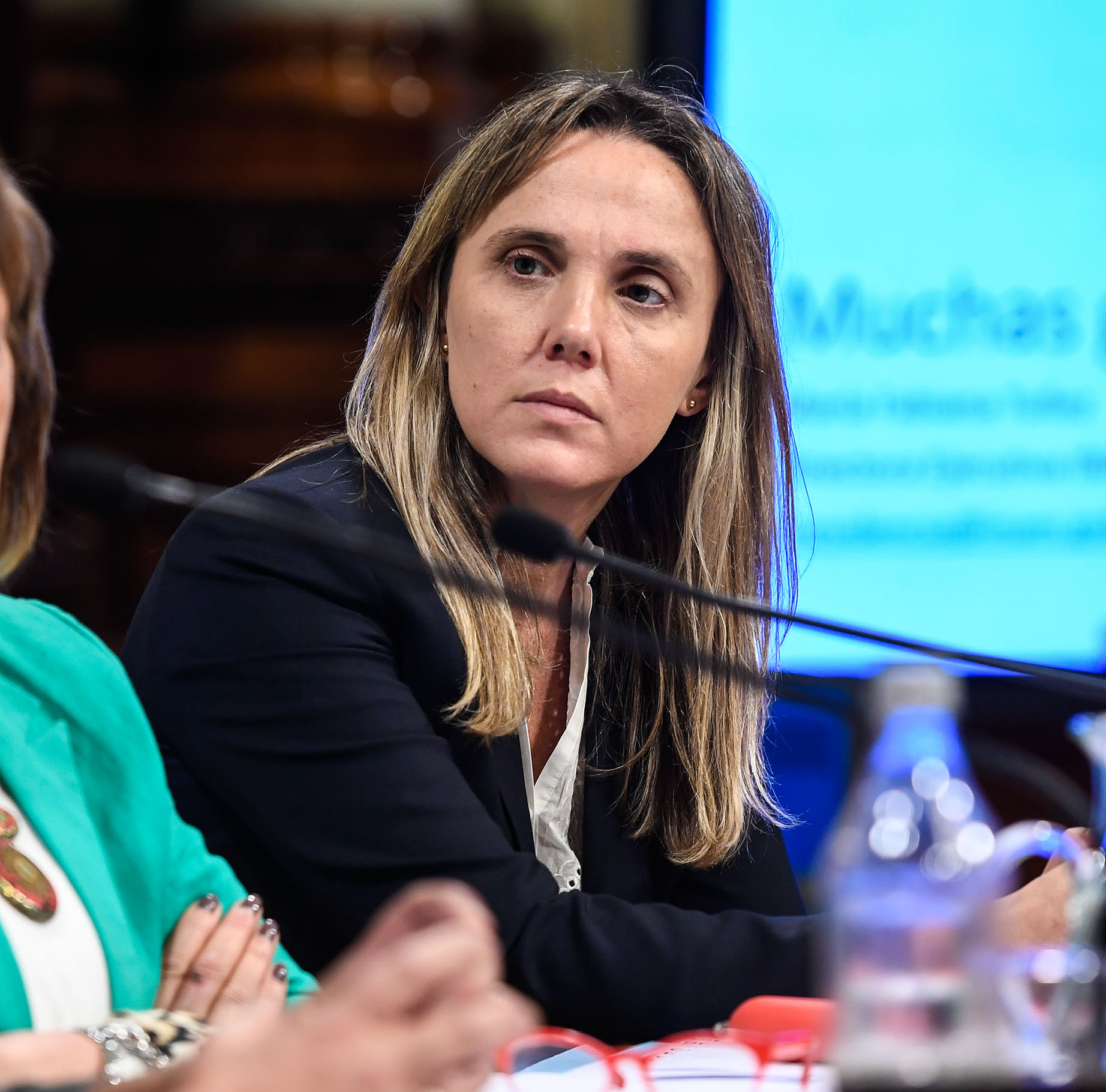

National Senator
- In office 10 December 2017 – 10 December 2023
- Constituency: Buenos Aires

National Deputy
- In office 10 December 2009 – 10 January 2017
- Constituency: Buenos Aires

Personal details
- Born: 30 May 1973 (age 53) San Carlos de Bolívar, Buenos Aires Province, Argentina
- Party: Republican Proposal
- Other political affiliations: Juntos por el Cambio (since 2015)
- Education: University of Buenos Aires

Gladys Esther González (born 30 May 1973) is a political scientist who served as National Deputy and National Senator forBuenos Aires Province for the Republican Proposal, within Juntos por el Cambio.

== Biography ==
González is a native of San Carlos de Bolívar, in the northern center of Buenos Aires. She was a candidate for mayor in 2015 in Avellaneda for the Cambiemos alliance. She has a degree on Political Science from the University of Buenos Aires Faculty of Social Sciences. She served as an advisor and legislative aide on Health and Decentralization at the Buenos Aires City Legislature (2003-2005).

In 2005 she was the Director of Banco Ciudad, a position she held until 2007. She is a member of the Pensar Foundation, Mauricio Macri's think tank under the government of Mauricio Macri as Chief of Government of the City of Buenos Aires, he served as Undersecretary of Citizen Attention.

In 2009, she was elected National Representative on the PRO Union list and re-elected in 2013. She was the head of the governor campaign of Miguel del Sel in Santa Fe (2011), and Campaign Manager of the National Representative Federico Pinedo (2011) . In 2009 she married her driver who was then appointed to the ministry as his press advisor. Today he is the president of the Buenos Aires Chamber of Deputies.

During her two terms in the National Congress, she was a member of the committees of the Elderly; Family, Woman, Childhood and Adolescence; Maritime, Fluvial, Fishing and Port Interests; Mining; Social Security and Forecasting; Third Age and transportation.

== Legislative elections of 2017 ==
On 22 October 2017, she was elected second Senator by the majority of the Province of Buenos Aires, seconding Esteban Bullrich on the Change List.
