= Brenda Austin =

Argentine politician (born 1981)

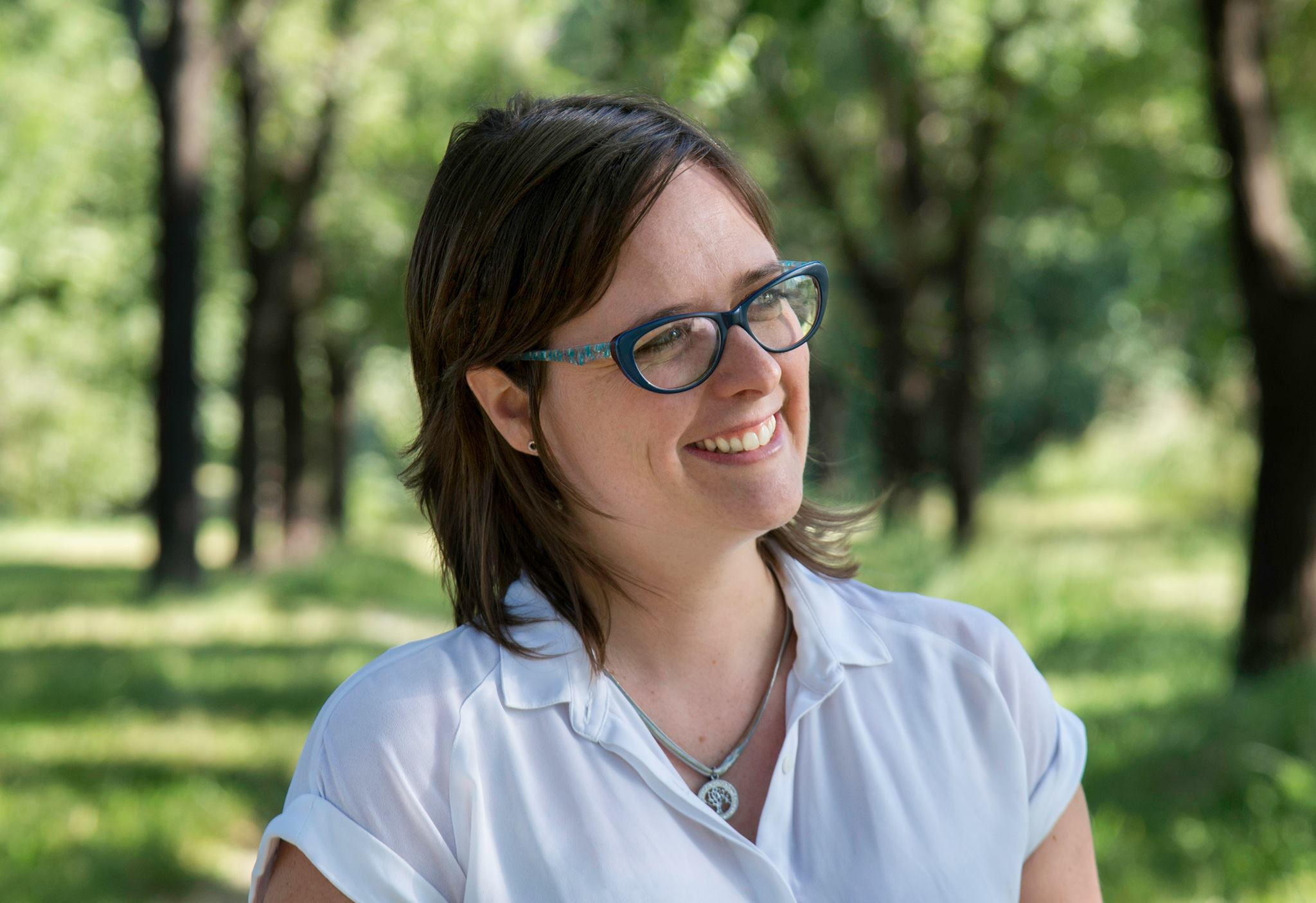

National Deputy
- In office 18 May 2016 – 10 December 2021
- Constituency: Córdoba

Personal details
- Born: 11 October 1981 (age 44) Esquel, Chubut Province, Argentina
- Party: Radical Civic Union
- Other political affiliations: Juntos por el Cambio (2015–present)
- Education: National University of Córdoba

Brenda Lis Austin (born 11 October 1981) is an Argentine politician who served as a National Deputy elected in Córdoba Province from 2016 to 2021. She is a member of the Radical Civic Union (UCR).

Austin held a number of posts in the municipal government of the City of Córdoba from 2014 to 2016; she was sworn in as deputy in replacement of Gerardo Bellocq, who died on 26 April 2016. She was re-elected in 2017.

== Early life and career ==
Austin was born in Esquel, Chubut Province on 11 October 1981. After finishing high school, she moved to Córdoba to study law at the National University of Córdoba. As a law student, she was elected president of the Faculty of Law student union, and later served as president of the Córdoba University Federation.

== Political career ==
Austin ran for a seat in the Chamber of Deputies in the 2013 legislative election as the fifth candidate in the Radical Civic Union list in Córdoba Province, but she was not elected. In 2014, during the mayorship of Ramón Javier Mestre, she was appointed Secretary of Education in the municipal government of Córdoba. In 2016, she took office as deputy following the death of Gerardo Bellocq (who had himself taken office following the resignation of Oscar Aguad to become Minister of Communications). She was sworn in on 18 May 2016.

Austin was re-elected in the 2017 legislative election, this time as part of the Cambiemos coalition; she was the fourth candidate in the list. Cambiemos was the most-voted alliance in Córdoba, with 48.48% of the vote; Austin was comfortably elected.

As a national deputy, Austin was a vocal supporter of the legalization of abortion in Argentina. She voted in favor of the two Voluntary Interruption of Pregnancy bills that were debated by the Argentine Congress in 2018 and 2020.
