= Felipe Solá =

Argentine politician and engineer

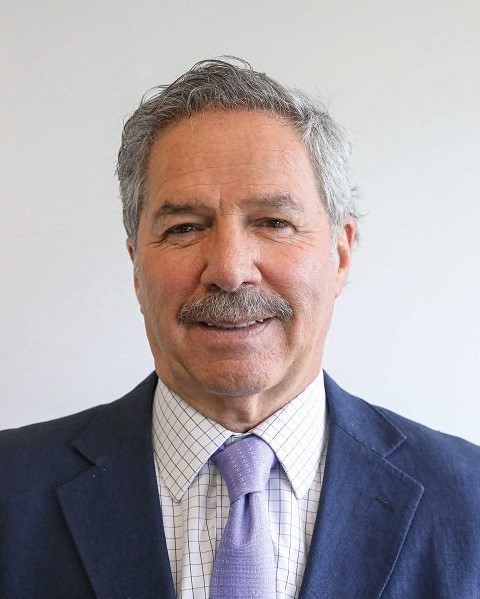

Minister of Foreign Affairs and Worship
- In office 10 December 2019 – 20 September 2021
- President: Alberto Fernández
- Preceded by: Jorge Faurie
- Succeeded by: Santiago Cafiero

National Deputy
- In office 10 December 2007 – 10 December 2019
- Constituency: Buenos Aires
- In office 10 December 1991 – 31 January 1993
- Constituency: Buenos Aires

Governor of Buenos Aires
- In office 3 January 2002 – 10 December 2007
- Vice Governor: Graciela Giannettasio (2003–2007)
- Preceded by: Carlos Ruckauf
- Succeeded by: Daniel Scioli

Vice Governor of Buenos Aires
- In office 10 December 1999 – 2 January 2002
- Governor: Carlos Ruckauf
- Preceded by: Rafael Romá
- Succeeded by: Graciela Giannettasio

Secretary of Agriculture, Livestock and Fisheries
- In office 31 January 1993 – 10 December 1999
- President: Carlos Menem
- Preceded by: Marcelo Regúnaga
- Succeeded by: Gumersindo Alonso
- In office 8 July 1989 – 10 December 1991
- President: Carlos Menem
- Preceded by: Ernesto Figueras
- Succeeded by: Marcelo Regúnaga

Personal details
- Born: 23 July 1950 (age 76) Buenos Aires, Argentina
- Party: Justicialist Party
- Other political affiliations: Renewal Front (2013–2019); Frente de Todos (2019–present)
- Spouses: María Teresa González (m. 1982–2003) María Helena Chaves (m. 2007)
- Education: University of Buenos Aires
- Profession: Agricultural engineer

Felipe Carlos Solá (Spanish pronunciation: [feˈli.pe ˈkaɾ.los soˈla]; born 23 July 1950) is an Argentine agricultural engineer and politician. He previously served as Governor of Buenos Aires Province, from 2002 to 2007, and as Minister of Foreign Affairs and Worship under President Alberto Fernández, from 2019 to 2021.

Solá was also Secretary of Agriculture during the presidency of Carlos Menem, and served as Vice Governor of Buenos Aires under Carlos Ruckauf until Ruckauf's resignation in 2002. From 2007 to 2019, he was a member of the Chamber of Deputies.

== Early life and personal life ==
Felipe Solá was born in Buenos Aires and raised in the upscale Recoleta neighborhood. Solá graduated from the University of Buenos Aires as an agricultural engineer in 1981.

Upon graduation Solá worked as a university professor, journalist, and economics counselor and researcher. He married María Teresa González in 1982, and they had two children; the couple were separated in 2003. He met María Helena Chaves in La Plata in 2004, and the two have lived in his home in Pilar since 2007.

== Early political career ==
Solá was appointed Minister of Agricultural Affairs by Buenos Aires Province Governor Antonio Cafiero in 1987. Newly elected President Carlos Menem named him Secretary of Agriculture, Livestock and Fishing in 1989, and in 1991 he was elected to the Argentine Chamber of Deputies for Buenos Aires Province on the Justicialist Party ticket.

Solá returned to the post of Secretary of Agriculture under Menem in 1993, remaining in the post until 1998. His tenure is best known for his controversial 1996 decision to allow the cultivation of GMO soy in Argentina, authorized a mere 81 days after Monsanto applied for a permit.

== Governor of Buenos Aires ==
On 10 December 1999, he became Vice Governor of Buenos Aires under Carlos Ruckauf, and took up the governorship on 3 January 2002, when Ruckauf resigned to become Foreign Affairs Minister for interim President Eduardo Duhalde after the socioeconomic collapse of 2001.

Solá abandoned his political allegiance to Duhalde after President Néstor Kirchner did likewise, aligning with Kirchner's expansionist policies. As governor and amid 9% economic growth, his support for Kirchnerist candidates in his province during the campaign for the 2005 legislative elections helped result for a landslide win over Duhalde's faction and other parties. He successfully headed Kirchner's Front for Victory party list for his province's congressional candidates in 2007, stepped down as governor and returned to Congress.

== Legislative terms ==
Having been rejected as running mate for 2007 Front for Victory presidential nominee Cristina Fernández de Kirchner, Solá became estranged from Kirchnerism during the 2008 Argentine government conflict with the agricultural sector and left their caucus to become a dissident Peronist. Ahead of the 2009 mid-term elections, he joined Francisco de Narváez and Mauricio Macri in Unión PRO, a center-right coalition of fellow dissident Peronists and the Republican Proposal (PRO) party.

Solá became a primary candidate in August 2009 for president ahead of the 2011 elections; but lacking support, he withdrew on 11 June and endorsed Duhalde's Popular Union ticket, which went on to fifth place.

He later joined the Renewal Front, a centrist Peronist faction created by Sergio Massa ahead of the 2013 mid-term elections. Like Solá, Massa had broken with President Cristina Kirchner after the 2008 agro-export tax hike dispute, and the Renewal Front bested Kirchner's Front for Victory in Buenos Aires Province in 2013.

Solá ran for Governor of Buenos Aires Province in 2015 on the Renewal Front-led United for a New Alternative ticket; but placed third (21%). He then headed Massa's Buenos Aires Province party list for the 2017 mid-term elections, dubbed 1País, but again placed third (11%).

He broke with the Renewal Front and on 22 October 2018, joined four fellow Renewal Front congressmen and four allies to create Red por Argentina (RxA; "Network for Argentina"). Amid a worsening economic crisis Solá stated that his goal was to promote unity against the Mauricio Macri administration for the 2019 elections. The member parties of Red por Argentina would later join the broader Frente de Todos coalition.

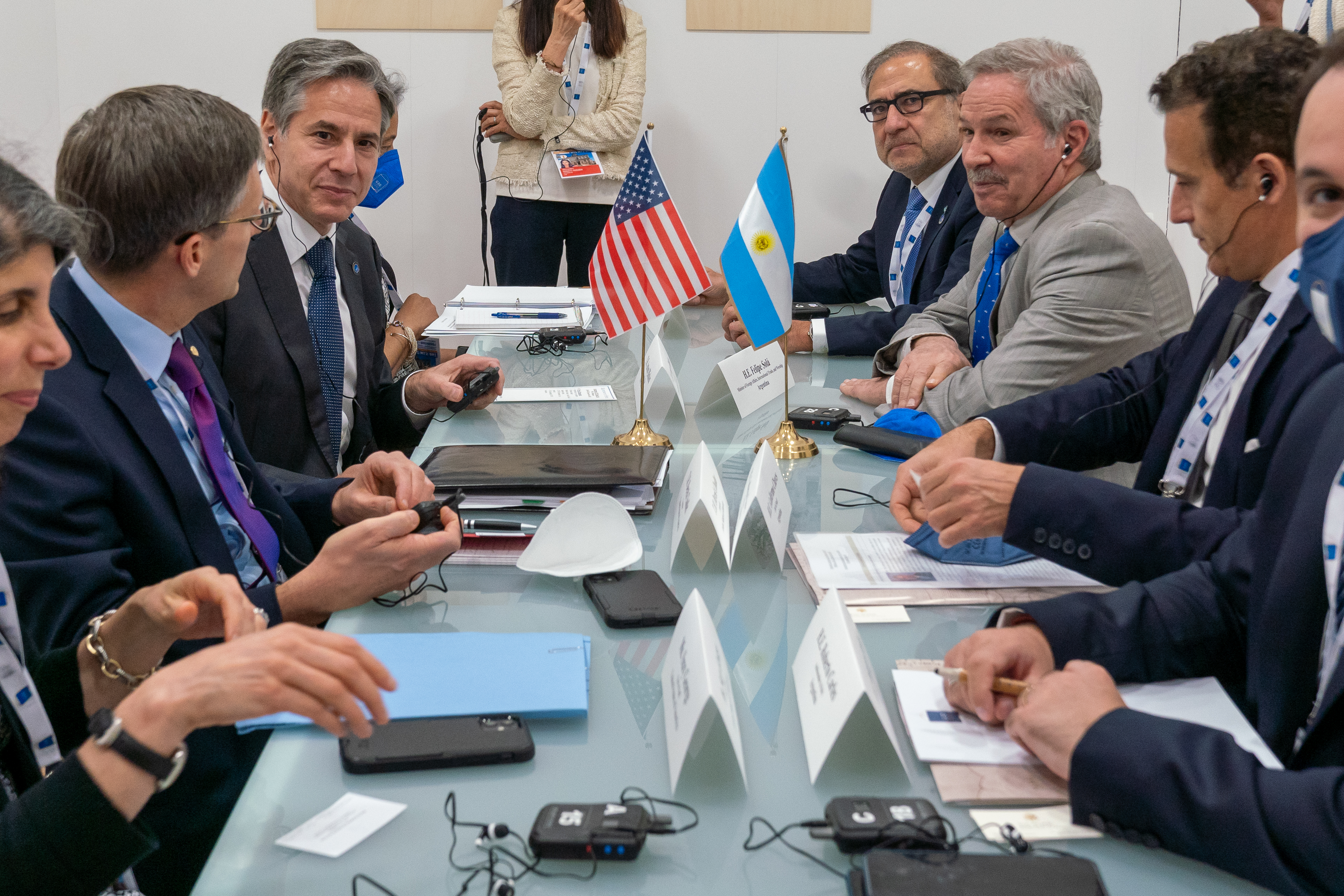
Solá meets with U.S. Secretary of State Antony J. Blinken in Bari, Italy, on June 29, 2021.

== Appointment as foreign minister ==
On 6 December 2019, it was announced Solá would be the next Minister of Foreign Affairs and Worship of Argentina in the incoming cabinet of President Alberto Fernández. He assumed office alongside the rest of the cabinet on 10 December 2019.

Solá was replaced by Cabinet Chief Santiago Cafiero on 20 September 2021 as part of a cabinet reshuffle, following the government's poor showings in the 2021 legislative primary elections

Political offices
Preceded by Rafael Romá	Vice Governor of Buenos Aires Province; 1999–2002	Succeeded by Graciela Giannettasio
Preceded by Carlos Ruckauf	Governor of Buenos Aires Province; 2002–2007	Succeeded by Daniel Scioli
Preceded by Jorge Faurie	Minister of Foreign Affairs and Worship; 2019–2021	Succeeded by Santiago Cafiero
