= United for a New Alternative =

Argentine political coalition (2015–2017)

United for a New Alternative Unidos por una Nueva Alternativa
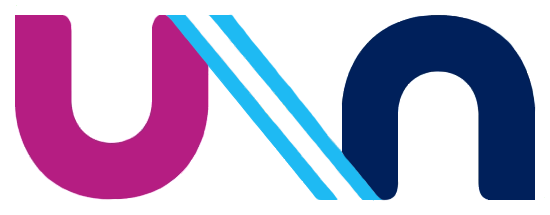
- Abbreviation: UNA
- Leader: Sergio Massa; José Manuel de la Sota
- Founded: April 30, 2015
- Dissolved: June 2017
- Succeeded by: 1País
- Headquarters: Buenos Aires
- Ideology: Peronism; Transversalism; Christian democracy Developmentalism
- Political position: Centre
- National affiliation: Alliance: Frente Renovador; Partido Demócrata Cristiano; Unión Popular; Union for Córdoba; Integration and Development Movement; Light Blue and White Union; UNIR Constitutional Nationalist Party; Third Position Party
- Colors: Navy Blue; Violet; Dark Magenta
- Mercosur Deputies: 4 / 43
- Senators: 0 / 72
- Deputies: 38 / 257
- Governors/Head of Government: 2 / 24

Website
- www.bloqueuna.org

United for a New Alternative (Spanish: Unidos por una Nueva Alternativa, UNA) was an Argentine Peronist political coalition, running for the 2015 Argentine general election. It is composed by the Frente Renovador, the Partido Demócrata Cristiano and the Movimiento de Integración y Desarrollo. It ran only once, in the 2015 elections.

In the primary elections of August 9 of that year, Massa and his running mate for vice president Gustavo Sáenz were confirmed as the front's official candidates for the general election. In that election they finished third with 21% of the vote.

In December 2015 a parliamentary inter-bloc was formed for the Chamber of Deputies made up of members of the coalition, under the name Federal Unidos por una Nueva Argentina.

== History ==
=== Formation ===
On April 30, 2015, national deputy Sergio Massa and the (then) governor of the province of Córdoba José Manuel de la Sota formalized an agreement to build an electoral space that would bring together a broader voting option against the Frente para la Victoria. UNA was presented at the Hilton Puerto Madero hotel.

=== 2015 elections ===
==== Simultaneous and mandatory open primaries (PASO) ====
The two lists that stood in the PASO for the Frente UNA were:

- Sergio Massa: lawyer and national deputy for the province of Buenos Aires. He had served as deputy for the province of Buenos Aires, chief of the Cabinet of Ministers, executive director of ANSES, and mayor of Tigre, elected twice in a row. His candidate for vice president was Gustavo Sáenz, a lawyer and mayor-elect of the City of Salta who had previously served as a Salta city councillor and held various positions in the Salta municipal cabinet. He had been a provincial senator for his district.
- José Manuel de la Sota: lawyer, former governor of the Province of Córdoba. He had been a National Deputy for Córdoba, Ambassador to Brazil, National Senator, and was elected Governor of his province three times. His candidate for vice president of the Nation was the former national deputy and trade unionist Claudia Rucci.

In June 2015, both candidates took part in a televised debate ahead of the primary elections, in which they discussed the economy, security, and development.

UNA finished third in the PASO. Between its two candidates (Massa and De la Sota) the alliance obtained 4,649,701 votes, approximately 20.63% of the electorate, with Massa winning the internal contest. With this result, Sergio Massa and his vice-presidential candidate Gustavo Sáenz were confirmed as the front's official ticket for the general election on October 25.

==== Presidential election ====
Massa stated after the PASO that De la Sota would be his Minister of the Interior in a hypothetical government. In the 2015 general election, UNA with Sergio Massa as candidate obtained 5,211,705 votes (21.39%), finishing in third place behind Daniel Scioli (Frente para la Victoria) and Mauricio Macri (Cambiemos). Ahead of the runoff between Scioli and Macri, Massa did not explicitly endorse either candidate but stated that society was looking for "a change." The runoff ultimately confirmed Macri as President of the Nation. In 2019, ahead of the national elections, most of the parties that made up the coalition, due to the bloc's weakness, disbanded and gave their support to different blocs, those of the Frente Renovador and Red Por Argentina joining the Frente de Todos, while Sergio Massa withdrew his candidacy. UNIR initially supported the Frente Despertar but, due to problems within the bloc, withdrew its support and aligned itself with the bloc of then-Argentine President and 2019 re-election candidate Mauricio Macri of Juntos por el Cambio. The remaining parties supported the non-Kirchnerist Peronist bloc Consenso Federal 2030 in the 2019 elections.

== Parties ==
Unidos por una Nueva Argentina was made up of:

Party	Main ideology	Leader
Frente Renovador	Federal Peronism	Sergio Massa
Partido Demócrata Cristiano	Christian democracy	Juan Carlos de la Peña
Unión Popular	Neoperonism	Graciela Devita
Movimiento de Integración y Desarrollo	Developmentalism	Carlos Zaffore
Unión Celeste y Blanco	Economic liberalism	Francisco de Narváez
Partido Nacionalista Constitucional - UNIR	Constitutionalism	Alberto Asseff
Tercera Posición	Peronism	Graciela Camaño

== Electoral performance ==
=== President ===
Election year	Candidate	1st round		2nd round		Result
Election year	Candidate	# of overall votes	% of overall vote	# of overall votes	% of overall vote	Result
2015	Sergio Massa	5,386,977	21.39 (3rd)			✗ Lost

=== Congressional elections ===
==== Chamber of Deputies ====
Election year	votes	%	Seats won	Total seats	Position	Presidency	Note
2015	4,115,826	17.6	17 / 130	37 / 257	Minority	Cristina Kirchner (FPV—PJ)	

After the October elections the Frente Renovador changed the bloc's name to Federal Unidos por una Nueva Argentina and, together with the blocs of Unidos por una Nueva Argentina, Trabajo y Dignidad, Movimiento Popular Neuquino, Compromiso con San Juan, Unión por Entre Ríos, Chubut Somos Todos, and Diálogo y trabajo, formed the 37-deputy inter-bloc "Federal Unidos por una Nueva Argentina."

The deputies who make up UNA are as follows:

Deputy	Province	Start	End	Bloc
Alegre, Gilberto Oscar	Buenos Aires	12/10/2013	12/09/2017	Federal Unidos por una Nueva Argentina (23)
Camaño, Graciela	Buenos Aires	12/10/2015	12/09/2019	Federal Unidos por una Nueva Argentina (23)
Ehcosor, María Azucena	Buenos Aires	12/10/2013	12/09/2017	Federal Unidos por una Nueva Argentina (23)
Litza, Mónica Edith	Buenos Aires	12/10/2013	12/09/2017	Federal Unidos por una Nueva Argentina (23)
Morales, Mariana Elizabet	Santiago del Estero	12/10/2015	12/09/2019	Federal Unidos por una Nueva Argentina (23)
Passo, Marcela Fabiana	Buenos Aires	12/10/2015	12/09/2019	Federal Unidos por una Nueva Argentina (23)
Schwindt, María Liliana	Buenos Aires	12/10/2013	12/09/2017	Federal Unidos por una Nueva Argentina (23)
Solá, Felipe Carlos	Buenos Aires	12/10/2013	12/09/2017	Federal Unidos por una Nueva Argentina (23)
Alonso, Horacio Fernando	Buenos Aires	12/10/2013	12/09/2017	Federal Unidos por una Nueva Argentina (23)
Daer, Héctor Ricardo	Buenos Aires	12/10/2013	12/09/2017	Federal Unidos por una Nueva Argentina (23)
Grandinetti, Alejandro Ariel	Santa Fe	12/10/2015	12/09/2019	Federal Unidos por una Nueva Argentina (23)
Massa, Sergio Tomas	Buenos Aires	12/10/2013	12/09/2017	Federal Unidos por una Nueva Argentina (23)
Moreau, Cecilia	Buenos Aires	12/10/2015	12/09/2019	Federal Unidos por una Nueva Argentina (23)
Pérez, Raúl Joaquín	Buenos Aires	12/10/2015	12/09/2019	Federal Unidos por una Nueva Argentina (23)
Selva, Carlos Américo	Buenos Aires	12/10/2015	12/09/2019	Federal Unidos por una Nueva Argentina (23)
Tundis, Mirta	Buenos Aires	12/10/2013	12/09/2017	Federal Unidos por una Nueva Argentina (23)
Bevilacqua, Gustavo	Buenos Aires	12/10/2015	12/09/2019	Federal Unidos por una Nueva Argentina (23)
De Mendiguren, José Ignacio	Buenos Aires	12/10/2013	12/09/2017	Federal Unidos por una Nueva Argentina (23)
Lavagna, Marco	CABA	12/10/2015	12/09/2019	Federal Unidos por una Nueva Argentina (23)
Massetani, Vanesa Laura	Santa Fe	12/10/2015	12/09/2019	Federal Unidos por una Nueva Argentina (23)
Moyano, Juan Facundo	Buenos Aires	12/10/2015	12/09/2019	Federal Unidos por una Nueva Argentina (23)
Pitiot, Carla Betina	CABA	12/10/2015	12/09/2019	Federal Unidos por una Nueva Argentina (23)
Snopek, Alejandro Francisco	Jujuy	12/10/2015	12/09/2019	Federal Unidos por una Nueva Argentina (23)
Asencio, Fernando Rodrigo	Buenos Aires	05/23/2018	12/09/2019	Federal Unidos por una Nueva Argentina (23)
Brezzo, María Eugenia	Córdoba	12/10/2013	12/09/2017	Unidos por una Nueva Argentina (6)
Brügge, Juan Fernando (PDC)	Córdoba	12/10/2015	12/09/2019	Unidos por una Nueva Argentina (6)
Calleri, Agustín Santiago	Córdoba	12/10/2013	12/09/2017	Unidos por una Nueva Argentina (6)
Nazario, Adriana Mónica	Córdoba	12/10/2015	12/09/2019	Unidos por una Nueva Argentina (6)
Rossi, Blanca Araceli	Córdoba	12/10/2013	12/09/2017	Unidos por una Nueva Argentina (6)
Rucci, Claudia Mónica	Buenos Aires	12/10/2013	12/09/2017	Unidos por una Nueva Argentina (6)
Bermejo, Sixto Osvaldo	Chubut	12/10/2013	12/09/2017	Trabajo y Dignidad (2)
Lagoria, Elia Nery	Chubut	12/10/2013	12/09/2017	Trabajo y Dignidad (2)
San Martín, Adrián	Neuquén	12/10/2013	12/09/2017	Movimiento Popular Neuquino (2)
Villar Molina, María Inés	Neuquén	12/10/2013	12/09/2017	Movimiento Popular Neuquino (2)
Castro Molina, Enrique Roberto	San Juan	12/10/2015	12/09/2019	Compromiso con San Juan (1)
Cremer de Busti, María Cristina	Entre Ríos	12/10/2013	12/09/2017	Unión por Entre Ríos (1)
Taboada, Jorge	Chubut	12/10/2015	12/09/2019	Chubut Somos Todos (1)
Raffo, Julio César Antonio	CABA	12/10/2013	12/09/2017	Dialogo y Trabajo (1)

= == =
Senate elections====

Election year	votes	%	Seats won	Total seats	Position	Presidency	Note
2015			1 / 24	3 / 72	Minority	Cristina Kirchner (FPV—PJ)	
