= Sergio Massa =

Argentine politician and lawyer (born 1972)

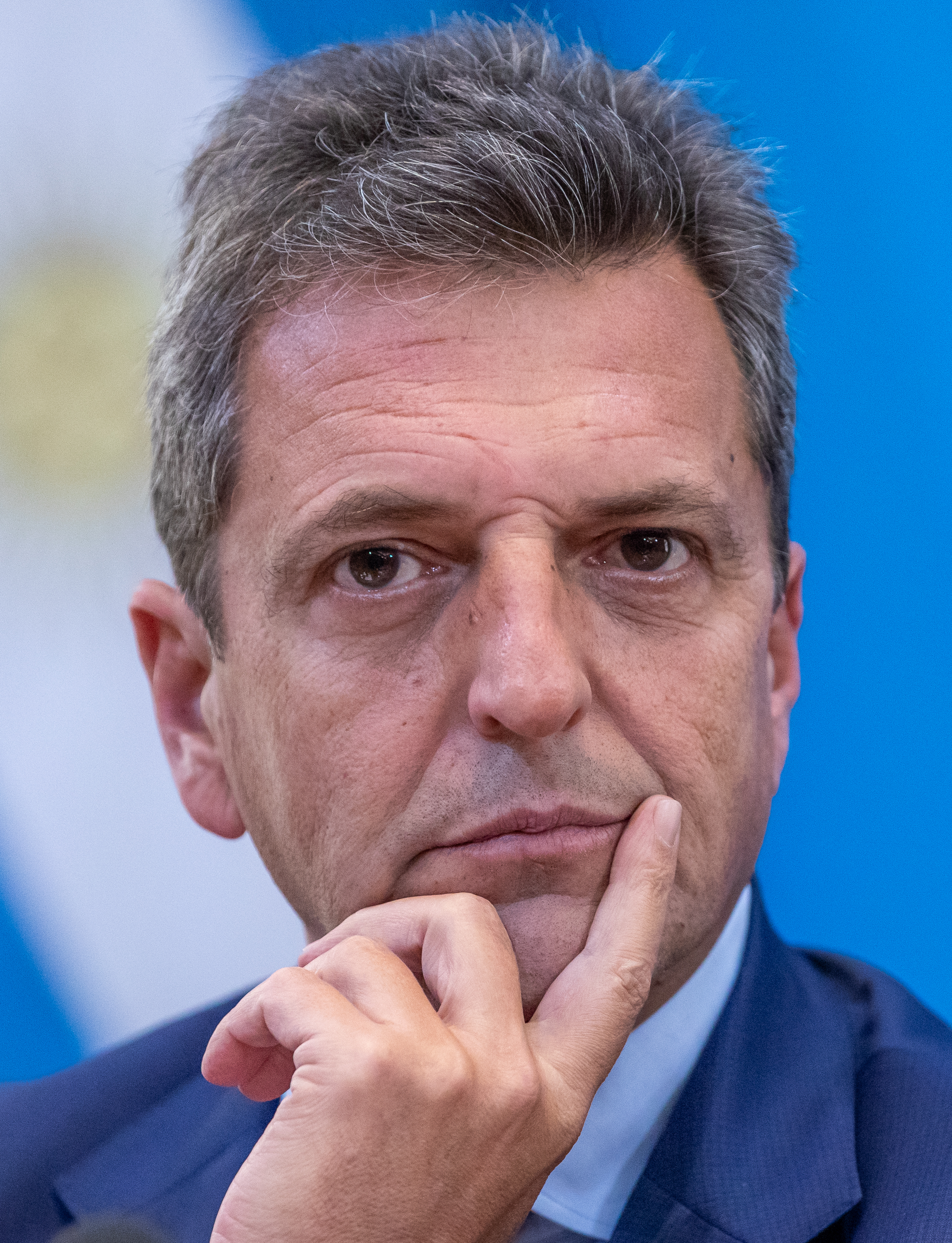
- Massa in 2023

Minister of Economy
- In office 3 August 2022 – 10 December 2023
- President: Alberto Fernández
- Preceded by: Silvina Batakis (Economy); Daniel Scioli (Production); Julián Domínguez (Agriculture)
- Succeeded by: Luis Caputo

President of the Chamber of Deputies
- In office 10 December 2019 – 2 August 2022
- Preceded by: Emilio Monzó
- Succeeded by: Cecilia Moreau

National Deputy
- In office 10 December 2019 – 3 August 2022
- Constituency: Buenos Aires
- In office 10 December 2013 – 10 December 2017
- Constituency: Buenos Aires

Mayor of Tigre
- In office 24 July 2009 – 25 November 2013
- Preceded by: Julio Zamora
- Succeeded by: Julio Zamora
- In office 10 December 2007 – 23 July 2008
- Preceded by: Hiram Gualdoni
- Succeeded by: Julio Zamora

Chief of the Cabinet of Ministers
- In office 23 July 2008 – 7 July 2009
- President: Cristina Fernández de Kirchner
- Preceded by: Alberto Fernández
- Succeeded by: Aníbal Fernández

Executive Director of the National Social Security Administration
- In office 23 January 2002 – 10 December 2007
- President: Eduardo Duhalde (2002–2003); Néstor Kirchner (2003–2007)
- Preceded by: Gustavo Macchi
- Succeeded by: Claudio Moroni

Provincial Deputy of Buenos Aires
- In office 10 December 1999 – 22 January 2002
- Constituency: First Electoral Section

Personal details
- Born: Sergio Tomás Massa; 28 April 1972 (age 54) San Martín, Buenos Aires, Argentina
- Party: Renewal Front (since 2013); Union of the Democratic Centre (1989–1995); Justicialist (1995–2013)
- Other political affiliations: Front for Victory (2007–2013); United for a New Alternative (2015–2017); 1País (2017–2019); Frente de Todos (2019–2023); Union for the Homeland (since 2023)
- Spouse: Malena Galmarini (m. 2001)
- Children: 2
- Education: University of Belgrano

Sergio Tomás Massa (Latin American Spanish pronunciation: [ˈseɾxjo toˈmas ˈmasa]; born 28 April 1972) is an Argentine politician and lawyer who served as Minister of Economy from 2022 to 2023. From 2019 to 2022, he was the National Deputy for the centre-left coalition Frente de Todos, elected in Buenos Aires Province, and the President of the Chamber of Deputies.

Previously, Massa served as the Chief of the Cabinet of Ministers from 2008 to 2009 under Cristina Fernández de Kirchner. He also held the role of intendente (mayor) of Tigre twice and served as the Executive Director of ANSES, Argentina's decentralized state social insurance agency.

A former member of the Justicialist Party, he founded a new political party, the Renewal Front, in 2013. As the leader of the United for a New Alternative coalition, Massa ran for president in 2015, finishing third in the first round of voting with 21% of the vote. Eight years later, in 2023, he ran for president for a second time as part of the Union for the Homeland coalition in October 2023. Massa won the first round with 36% of the vote, but lost the November run-off to Javier Milei by a margin of nearly 12%.

== Early life ==
Massa was born in the western Buenos Aires suburb of San Martín in 1972, to Italian parents. His father was born in Niscemi, Sicily, and his mother in Trieste, Friuli-Venezia Giulia. He was raised in the neighboring San Andrés. He attended St Augustine's primary and secondary schools, and later enrolled at the University of Belgrano, a private university in the upscale Buenos Aires borough of the same name. He left school before completing his law degree studies and married Malena Galmarini.

== Political career ==
=== Early career ===
Massa became affiliated to the conservative UCeDé in 1989 as an aide to Alejandro Keck, councilman for the San Martín partido (which includes San Andrés). He joined the ruling Justicialist Party in 1995, when the UCeDé endorsed the re-election of President Menem after the latter had sidestepped much of his populist Justicialist Party's platform in favor of a more conservative one. In 1999, he was elected to the Buenos Aires Province Chamber of Deputies as part of the Justicialist Party list. Shortly after a crisis led to President Fernando de la Rúa's December 2001 resignation, the Congress appointed Senator Eduardo Duhalde, a more traditional Peronist than Menem had been. Acquainted with Massa through Restaurant Workers' Union leader Luis Barrionuevo, Duhalde appointed him Director of the ANSeS (Argentina's Social Security administration).

The pragmatic Massa ran on President Néstor Kirchner's center-left Front for Victory ticket during the 2005 legislative elections. Securing a seat in the Chamber of Deputies (lower house of Congress), he forfeited it at the behest of the President, who requested that he stay on as Director of ANSeS. Remaining at the post two more years, he oversaw the voluntary conversion of several million private pension accounts to the ANSeS' aegis when this choice was made available in December 2006.

=== Mayor of Tigre and Cabinet Chief ===
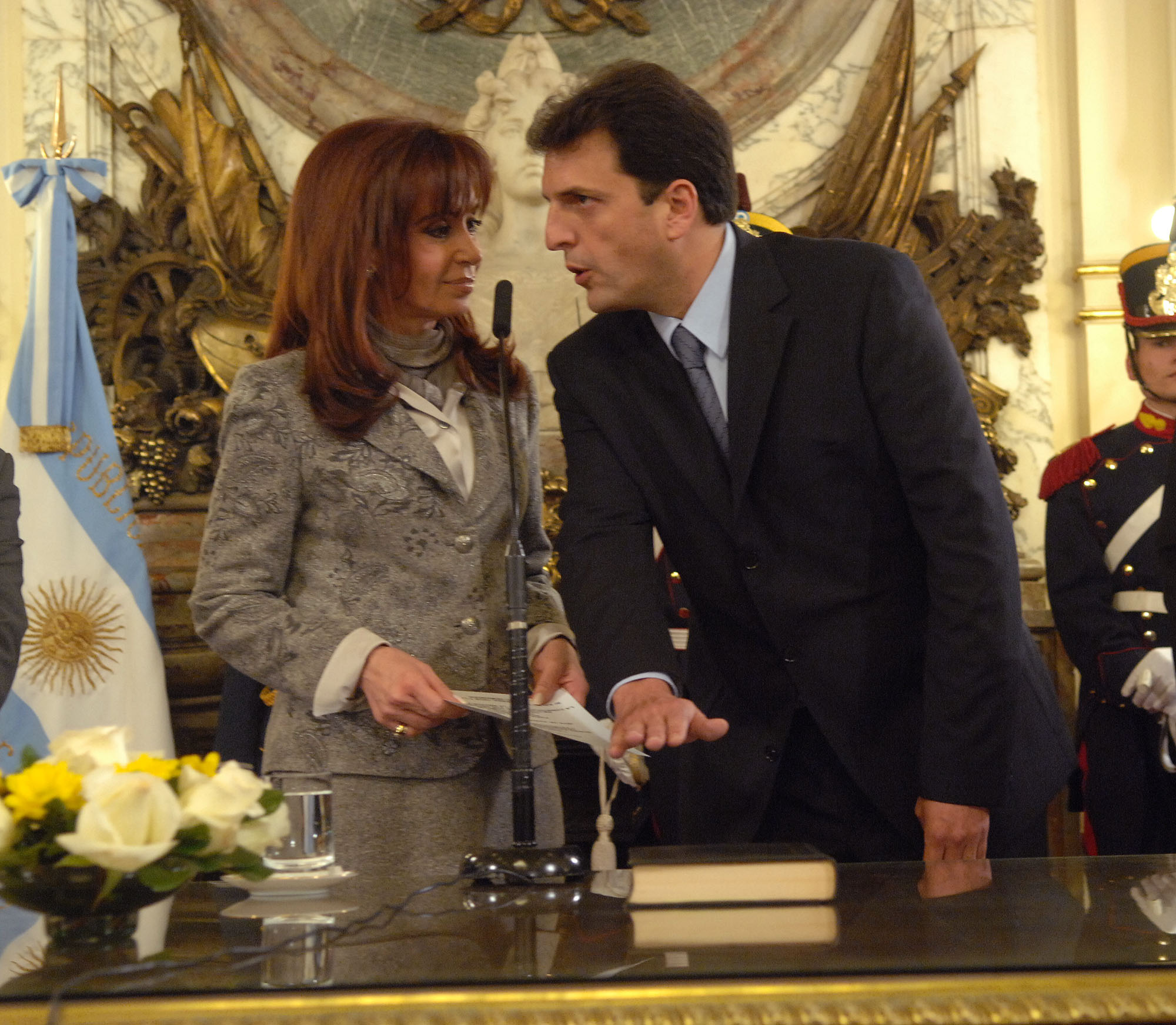
Massa being sworn in as Cabinet Chief by President Cristina Fernández in 2008.

Massa was elected Mayor of the Paraná Delta partido of Tigre in October 2007. That year's elections also brought President Néstor Kirchner's wife, Senator Cristina Kirchner, to the Presidency. Enjoying large majorities in Congress, her administration suffered its first major setback when her proposals for higher agricultural export taxes were defeated on 16 July 2008, with Vice President Julio Cobos's surprise, tie-breaking vote against them. The controversy helped lead to the 23 July resignation of Alberto Fernández, the president's Cabinet Chief, and to his replacement with Sergio Massa who, at 36, became the youngest person to hold the influential post since its creation in 1994.

He was persuaded to run as a stand-in candidate (who, after the election, would cede his new seat to a down-ticket name on the party list) for the ruling Front for Victory (FpV) ahead of the June 2009 mid-term elections. Massa, however, enlisted his own candidates (including his wife) for the Tigre City Council under his own ticket, and its success in these city council races distanced him from others in the FpV. Massa had, moreover, harbored differences with the president over a number of policies, including the nationalization of loss-producing private pension funds, the use of the INDEC bureau to understate inflation data, and the vast regulatory powers granted to Commerce Secretary Guillermo Moreno. Following the FpV's narrow defeat in the Chamber of Deputies mid-term races, Massa tendered his resignation to the President, effective 7 July. Massa, who appointed the city council president as provisional mayor while he served as the president's cabinet chief, returned to his office of Mayor of Tigre on 24 July. He was investigated along with other officials for the illegal retention of "repayments" of nonexistent loans from the pensions of about 17 thousand retired while he was director of the ANSES

=== Break with the Kirchners ===
In 2010, Massa joined a group of eight Buenos Aires Province mayors in calling for the establishment of local police departments independent of the Provincial Police; this 'Group of 8' had become disaffected to varying degrees with the Kirchner government, and came to view Massa as presidential timber for a future date. He stumbled into controversy, however, when the WikiLeaks disclosures of 2010 mentioned a number of indiscretions on Massa's part during a dinner hosted the previous year at the U.S. Ambassador's Residence. He was said by one of Ambassador Vilma Socorro Martínez's cables to have revealed details about working with former President Néstor Kirchner, stating that he was "a psychopath; a monster whose bully approach to politics shows his sense of inferiority." He reportedly added that the former president "runs the Argentine government" while his wife (the President) "followed orders," and that she "would be better off without him." He nevertheless remained allied as a member of the FpV faction and the Cristina Kirchner administration, and was re-elected mayor on the FpV slate with 73% of the vote in 2011.

Polling ahead of the October 2013 mid-term elections gave Massa better prospects running for Congress under the FpV party list than on a separate slate. Upon the filing deadline on 22 June, however, Massa ultimately opted to form his own Frente Renovador ('Renewal Front') faction with the support of the 'Group of 8' Buenos Aires Province Mayors and others, notably former Argentine Industrial Union president José Ignacio de Mendiguren (recently an ally of Kirchner). This split with Kirchner proved successful for Massa as the Renewal Front slate beat the FpV slate in the Buenos Aires province in both the primary and general elections.

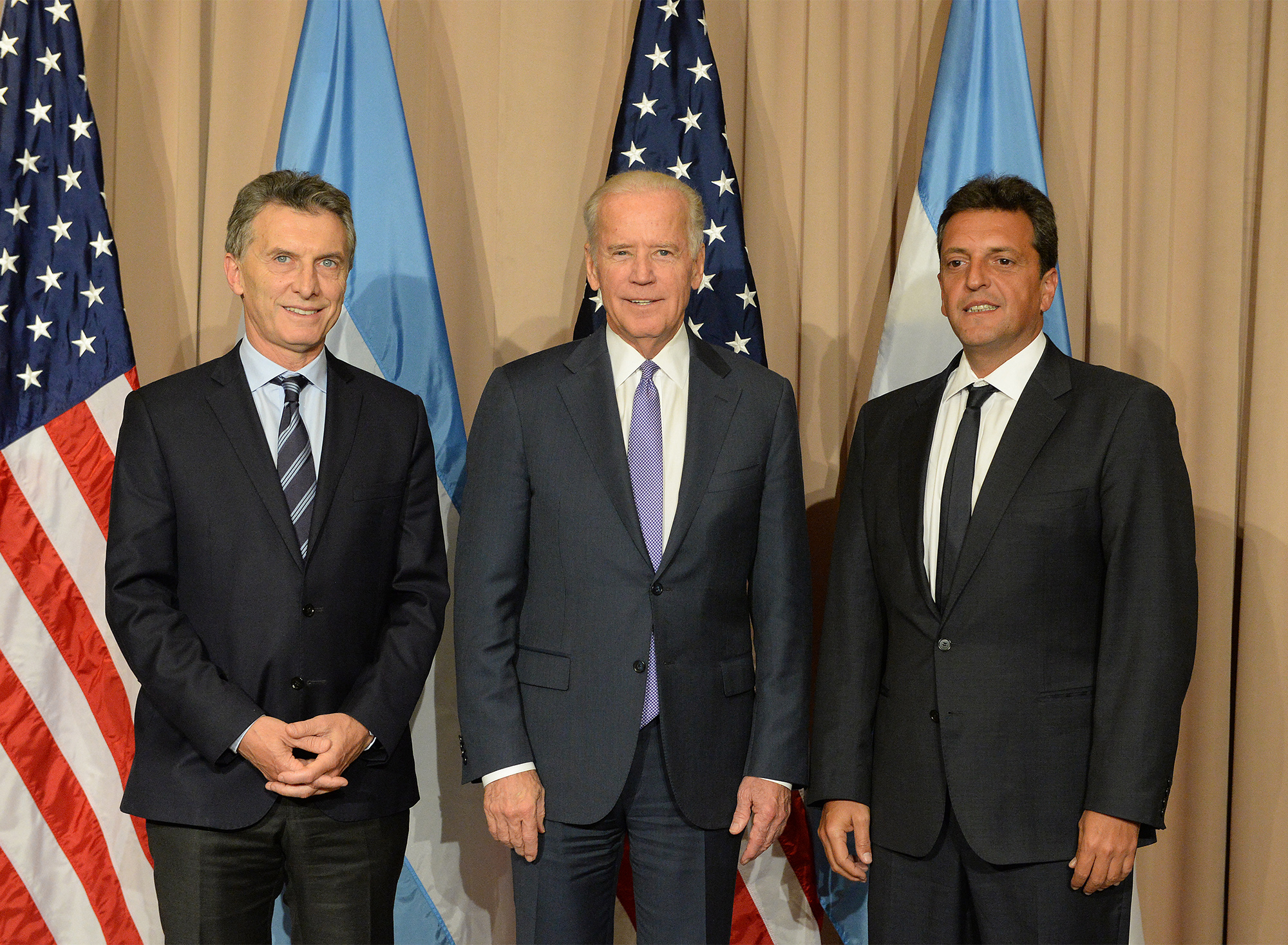
Mauricio Macri, Joe Biden, and Massa in 2016

In October 2013, Javier Corradino, president of the Commercial Chamber of Tigre, Adrian Zolezzi, secretary of the same entity, and Santiago Maneiro, secretary of the Commercial Chamber of Pacheco, reported that four of their shops had been closed by Sergio Massa in retaliation for having made a trade agreement with the National Social Security Administration to operate the Argenta card, administered by ANSeS. They denounced the closures as anti-democratic and an act of political persecution towards traders in the municipality. Javier Corradino was expelled from a campaign of Renewal Front's Malena Galmarini, Tigre City Council secretary for health policy and human development, and wife of Sergio Massa.

=== 2015 and 2017 campaigns ===
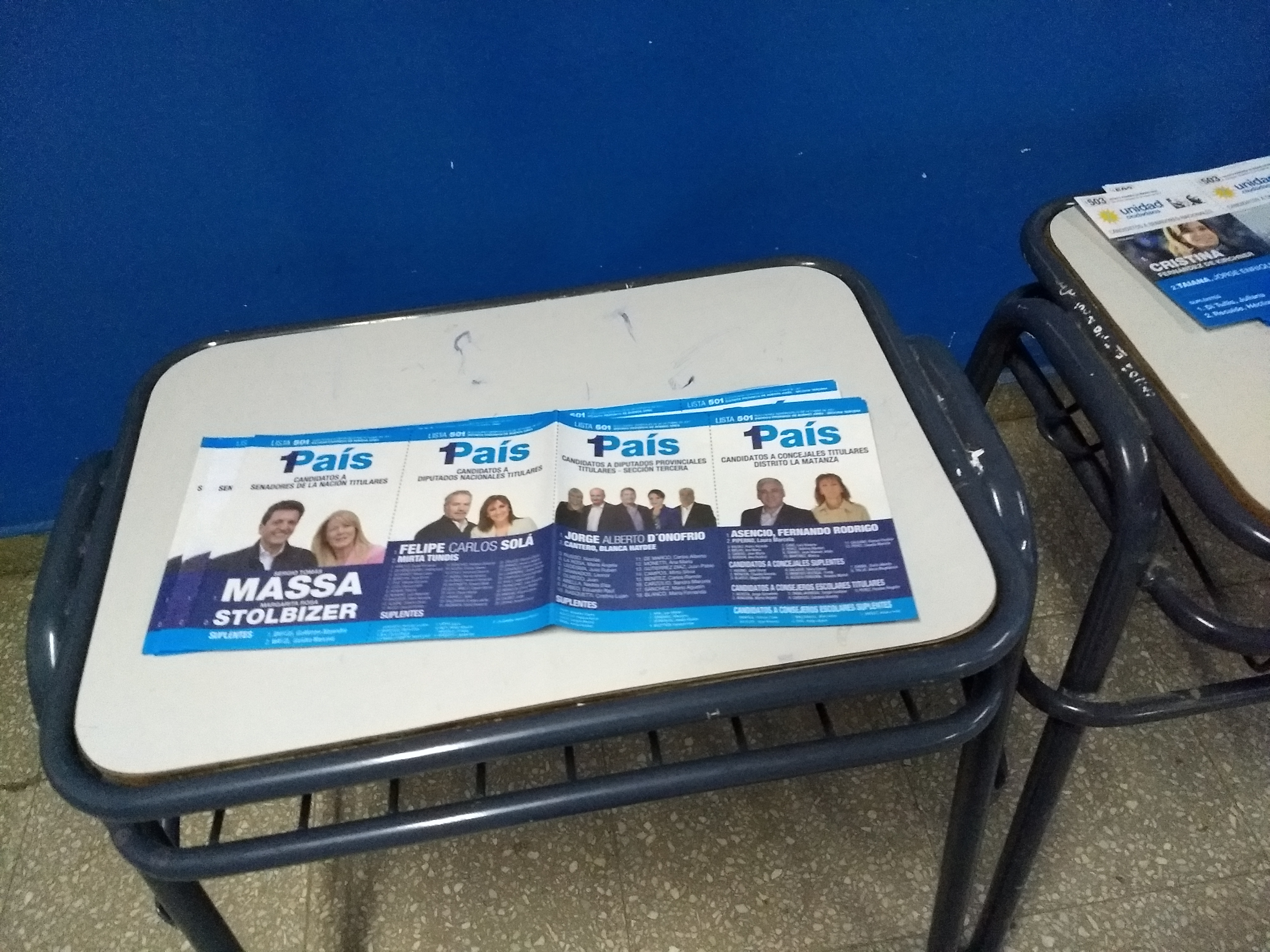
1País lists in the 2017 legislative election, with Massa and Stolbizer as first and second candidates to the Senate for Buenos Aires.

Ahead of the 2015 general election, Massa announced his intention to run for President of Argentina. He joined forces with Córdoba governor José Manuel de la Sota to form the United for a New Alternative alliance. Massa sought to appeal to centrist voters in an election disputed by the Peronist Daniel Scioli and the centre-right conservative Mauricio Macri, and focused his campaign on the fight against corruption, climate change, and development through renewable energy sources. In the first round of voting, on 25 October 2015, Massa was the third-most voted candidate with 21% of the vote, trailing behind Scioli and Macri, who went on to dispute the presidency in the second round.

In the 2017 legislative election, Massa's Renewal Front joined forces with progressives Margarita Stolbizer and Victoria Donda to form the 1País ("1Country") electoral coalition. Facing the end of his term as national deputy, Massa and Stolbizer ran for Buenos Aires Province's seats in the National Senate. The senatorial bid was, however, unsuccessful, as the 1País list landed third in the election behind Cambiemos and Unidad Ciudadana.

=== Frente de Todos and presidency of the Chamber ===
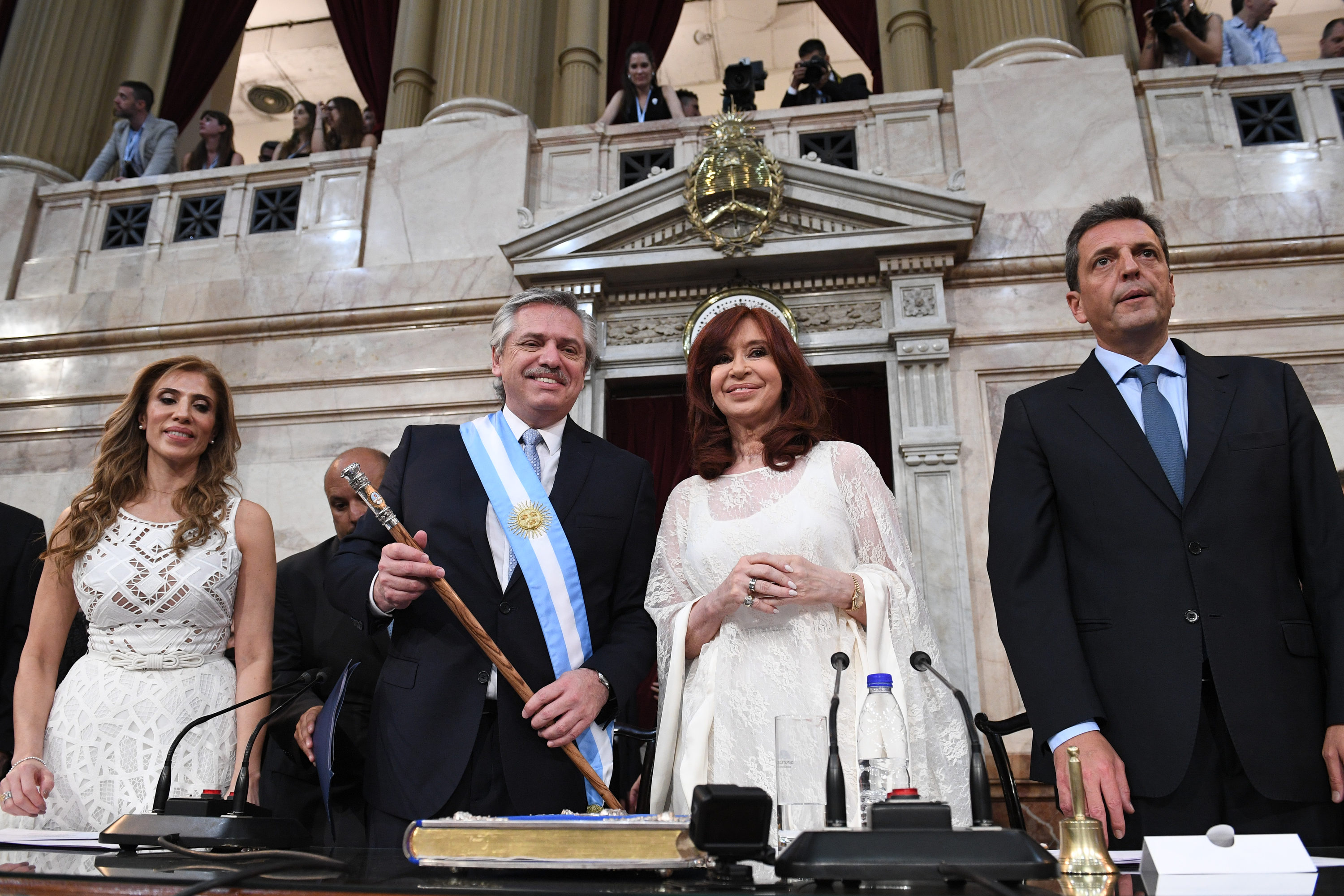
Massa (far right) at the inauguration of Alberto Fernández.

Ahead of the 2019 general election, Massa made public his intention to once again run for President and launched "Alternativa Federal", a coalition with other non-Kirchnerist members of the Justicialist Party such as Miguel Ángel Pichetto and Juan Manuel Urtubey. However, following the announcement of Cristina Fernández de Kirchner that she would not run for President, but would instead back Alberto Fernández, Massa stood down from the race and pledged his support for the newly formed Frente de Todos, a coalition of Peronist parties and alliances, both Kirchnerist and non-Kirchnerist. He was then nominated to run for a seat in the National Chamber of Deputies as the first candidate in the Frente de Todos list in Buenos Aires Province.

The Frente de Todos list won in a landslide in Buenos Aires Province, easily securing Massa's seat in the Chamber. Upon taking office on 4 December 2019, he was elected as president of the Chamber, succeeding Emilio Monzó. As president of the Chamber of Deputies, Massa introduced modifications to the chamber statute to guarantee gender parity in parliamentary commissions, and splitting the commission on Family, Women, Children and Adolescence into two separate commissions for Family and Childhood and Women and Diversity. During the COVID-19 pandemic and subsequent lockdown in Argentina, Massa's administration sought to lower the costs of parliamentary proceedings by suspending legislative aides and restricting mobility benefits for deputies.

In December 2021, Massa was ratified as president of the Chamber for another two years by all parliamentary blocs in the Chamber.

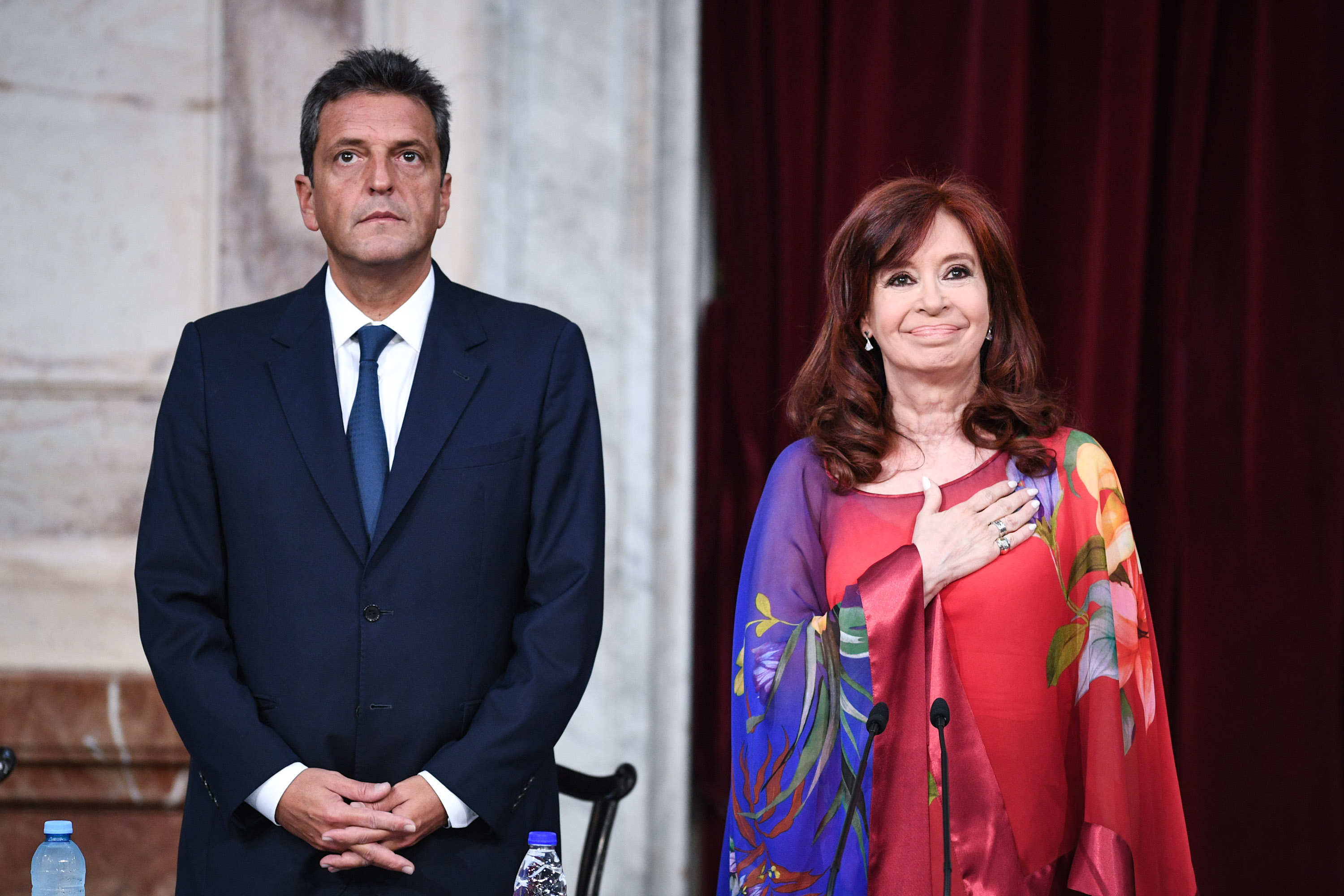
Massa with Cristina Fernández de Kirchner in March 2020.

One of Massa's flagship issues during his tenure as president of the Chamber was the reduction of tax pressures on the middle class. In 2022, Renewal Front deputies introduced legislation to raise the minimum quota for income tax.

=== Minister of Economy ===
On 29 July 2022, Massa was designated as the country's new Minister of Economy, taking over three previously stand-alone ministries of Economy, Productive Development and Agriculture in the cabinet of President Alberto Fernández. Massa's designation came less than a month after Silvina Batakis' appointment, following the resignation of Martín Guzmán. The fusion of the three ministries led the media to dub Massa superministro ("super-minister"), a term that had previously been used to describe economy ministers in other governments such as Nicolás Dujovne and Domingo Cavallo.

Initial market speculations regarding Massa's first measures as minister led to the Argentine peso recovering against the US dollar, with the unofficial exchange rate ("dólar blue") descending to $280 ARS per dollar on 1 August 2022, down from the peak of $338 ARS per dollar on 21 July.

=== 2023 presidential run ===
On 23 June 2023, Massa was announced as the presidential candidate of the new Unión por la Patria coalition, with Cabinet Chief Agustín Rossi as his running mate. He was endorsed by President Fernández, vice president Cristina Kirchner, and other majoritarian sectors of the Peronist coalition. He won a primary election for the coalition's nomination against social leader Juan Grabois of the Patria Grande Front on 13 August 2023. In the general election in October 2023 he won 36.6% of votes to Javier Milei's 29.9%, but was defeated by Milei in the November run-off and conceded peacefully in what was described as a historic election; he later proclaimed that he would resign from politics.

== Controversies ==
=== Inflation during his tenure as Economy Minister ===
During Massa's term as Minister of Economy, Argentina experienced a sharp acceleration in consumer prices. In November 2023, the last full month of his ministerial tenure, the INDEC reported a 12.8% monthly increase in the consumer price index, with year-to-date inflation of 148.2% and annual inflation of 160.9%. The following monthly report, covering December 2023, recorded a 25.5% monthly rise and a cumulative annual increase of 211.4%.

=== SIRA import system ===
The Sistema de Importaciones de la República Argentina (SIRA), used between October 2022 and December 2023, was a mechanism through which companies requested authorizations to import goods and access foreign currency at the official exchange rate. The process involved the tax authority, the Secretariat of Commerce and the Central Bank. Federal courts later investigated alleged irregularities in the system, including reports that intermediaries and businesspeople had paid bribes to obtain import permits during the Fernández administration, while Massa was serving as economy minister.

=== AySA and Malena Galmarini ===
Massa's wife, Malena Galmarini, served as president of Agua y Saneamientos Argentinos (AySA) between 2019 and 2023. In 2024, the government of Javier Milei publicly questioned spending decisions made during the previous management of the company, including alleged unnecessary expenses and the allocation of works to districts politically linked to the former administration. Galmarini had previously defended her administration at AySA, stating that the company had been subject to audits and that its management had expanded access to water and sewer services.

== Other activities ==
- World Bank, Ex-Officio Member of the Board of Governors (since 2022)

== Personal life ==
Massa is married to Malena Galmarini, a fellow politician, and a member of a Peronist political family. Galmarini and Massa met in 1996 and married in 2001. The couple has two children, Milagros and Tomás. Through Galmarini's father, Fernando Galmarini, Massa is the son-in-law of TV presenter and vedette Moria Casán.

Massa is a supporter of the football club Club Atlético Tigre.

== Electoral history ==
=== Executive ===
Electoral history of Sergio Massa
Election	Office	List	Votes			Result	Ref.
Election	Office	List	Total	%	P.	Result	Ref.
2007	Mayor of Tigre	Front for Victory	125,472	77.17%	1st	Elected	
2011	Mayor of Tigre	Front for Victory	130,810	73.14%	1st	Elected	
2015 1-R	President of Argentina	United for a New Alternative	5,386,977	21.39%	3rd	Not elected	
2023 1-R	President of Argentina	Union for the Homeland	9,853,492	36.78%	1st	→ Round 2	
2023 2-R	President of Argentina	Union for the Homeland	11,384,014	44.25%	2nd	Not elected	

=== Legislative ===
Electoral history of Sergio Massa
Election	Office	List	#	District	Votes			Result	Ref.
Election	Office	List	#	District	Total	%	P.	Result	Ref.
1999	Provincial Deputy	Justicialist Concertation	7	First Electoral Section	854,583	40.80%	1st (Note: Presented on an electoral list. The data shown represents the share of the vote the entire party/alliance received in that constituency.)	Elected	
2009	National Deputy	Justicialist Front for Victory	5	Buenos Aires Province	2,418,104	32.18%	2nd	Not elected	
2013	National Deputy	Renewal Front	1	Buenos Aires Province	3,943,056	43.95%	1st	Elected	
2017	National Senator	1País	1	Buenos Aires Province	1,069,747	11.31%	3rd	Not elected	
2019	National Deputy	Frente de Todos	1	Buenos Aires Province	5,113,359	52.64%	1st	Elected	

Political offices
Preceded by Gustavo Macchi	Executive Director of ANSES; 2002–2007	Succeeded by Claudio Moroni
Preceded by Alberto Fernández	Chief of the Cabinet of Ministers; 2008–2009	Succeeded by Aníbal Fernández
Preceded by Emilio Monzó	President of the Chamber of Deputies; 2019–2022	Succeeded by Cecilia Moreau
Preceded by Silvina Batakis	Minister of Economy; 2022–2023	Succeeded by Luis Caputo
