= Renewal Front =

Political party in Argentina

Renewal Front Frente Renovador
- Abbreviation: FR
- Leader: Sergio Massa
- President: Pablo Mirolo
- Founder: Sergio Massa
- Founded: 24 June 2013; 13 years ago
- Split from: Justicialist Party
- Headquarters: Av. del Libertador 850, Buenos Aires
- Youth wing: La Renovadora
- Membership (2022): 28,000
- Ideology: Peronism; Federal Peronism
- Political position: Centre
- National affiliation: Homeland Force
- Colors: Blue
- Seats in the Chamber of Deputies: 8 / 257
- Seats in the Senate: 0 / 72
- Province Governors: 0 / 24

Website
- frenterenovador.org.ar
- Politics of Argentina; Political parties; Elections; A: The party has been variously described as centrist, centre-left, and centre-right.

The Frente Renovador (FR) is an Argentine Peronist political party. The party is a member of the centre-left political coalition Union for the Homeland. In 2019 the party was legally recognized after obtaining definitive legal status in the electoral districts of Buenos Aires Province, Autonomous City of Buenos Aires, Santa Cruz, Tucumán, Santiago del Estero, Santa Fe, La Pampa and Chubut.

The immediate precedent is a district electoral coalition of the Buenos Aires Province in Argentina, established in 2013 to participate in the legislative elections of that year. It was composed by the parties Fuerza Organizada Renovadora Democrática, Frente Renovador de la Provincia de Buenos Aires, Unión Popular, Nuevo Buenos Aires, Tercera Posición, Movimiento por la Equidad, la Justicia y la Organización Popular, Party of Labour and Equity, and the Partido de la Concertación Social, and recognized Sergio Massa as its most prominent leader, who headed the list of candidates for national deputies.

Although the Frente Renovador did not run in the 2015 presidential elections, the national political coalition UNA, which supported Sergio Massa's candidacy for president, is frequently referred to as the "Renewal Front". Currently, the party is a member of the Union for the Homeland political coalition, previously called Everybody's Front, which fielded Massa himself as a candidate for the first national deputy for the Buenos Aires Province. In December 2019, Massa was elected President of the Chamber of Deputies of the Nation, occupying the third place in the presidential line of succession.

In the 2023 elections, Sergio Massa was the candidate put forward by the Renewal Front and Union for the Homeland, coming in first place in the initial round. Nevertheless, he lost in the runoff to Javier Milei, who was sworn in as president of Argentina on 10 December.

== History ==
It was in opposition against the ruling Front for Victory faction within the Justicialist Party and therefore considered part of the dissident Peronist wing until 2019.

The Front was founded by Sergio Massa, the mayor of Tigre, in 2013, ahead of the Argentine mid-term elections. Massa was chief of the cabinet under President Cristina Fernández de Kirchner from 2008 to 2009 and member of the Front for Victory but broke with the Kirchnerist faction and formed his own political movement.

In the October 2013 mid-term election for the Argentine Chamber of Deputies, the party won 43.9% of the votes and 16 of 35 seats in Buenos Aires Province, distancing the Front of Victory by more than 11 percentage points.

The Renewal Front demonstrated against a possible reform of the National Constitution to enable a third consecutive term of the then President Cristina Fernández de Kirchner.

The Renewal Front held Sergio Massa's candidacy for presidency within the national coalition for United for a New Alternative. Massa triumphs in the intern against José Manuel de la Sota and is a candidate in the 2015 presidential elections, where he obtained third place and failed to enter the ballotage.

In the 2017 legislative elections, it is grouped together with Generation for a National Encounter, led by Margarita Stolbizer, to form the 1 Country front which promoted the Massa formula for senator and Felipe Solá for deputy.

After discrepancies regarding the direction that space should take in October 2018, Felipe Solá with Facundo Moyano, Daniel Arroyo, Fernando Asencio and Jorge Toboada decided to leave the space, forming another block in congress and definitively breaking with Sergio Massa.

In 2019, the Renewal Front formed the Frente de Todos supporting the presidential formula Alberto Fernández – Cristina Fernández de Kirchner. The leader of the party, Sergio Massa, ran for the first national deputy candidate for the province of Buenos Aires. Massa became President of the Chamber of Deputies and Mario Meoni became Minister of Transport. In July 2022, Sergio Massa transferred to economy 'superminister', leading a new ministry overseeing economic, manufacturing and agricultural policy.

In the 2023 Argentine general election, Massa was the presidential candidate of the ruling Union for the Homeland. In the runoff Libertarian candidate Javier Milei defeated Massa with 55.7% of the vote, the highest percentage of the vote since Argentina's transition to democracy. Massa conceded defeat shortly before the official results were published.

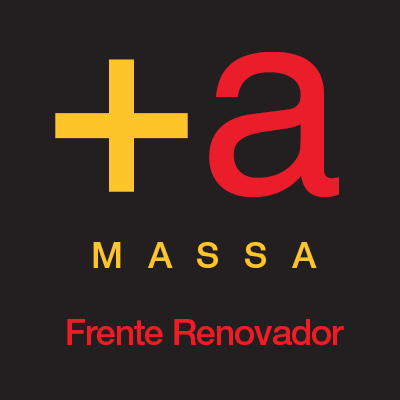
First logo used in 2013

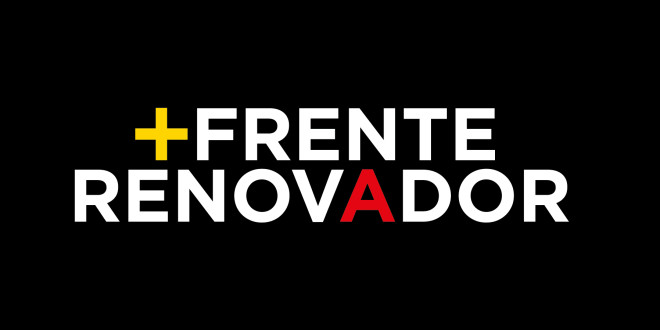
Logo used in 2015

== Electoral performance ==
=== President ===
Election	Candidate	Coalition	First round		Second round		Result
Election	Candidate	Coalition	Votes	%	Votes	%	Result
2015	Sergio Massa	United for a New Alternative	5,386,977	21.39 (#3)	—N/a		Lost
2019	Alberto Fernández (PJ)	Everyone's Front	12,473,709	48.10 (#1)	—N/a		Won
2023	Sergio Massa	Union for the Homeland	9,853,492	36.78 (#1)	11,598,720	44.31 (#2)	Lost

== See also ==
- United for a New Alternative
- Federal Peronism (Centre-right faction of the Justicialist Party)
- Front for Victory (Centre-left faction of the Justicialist Party)
