= List of Argentine senators, 2015–2017 =

This is list of members of the Argentine Senate from 10 December 2015 to 9 December 2017.

== Composition ==
As of 9 December 2017

Allies	Political party	Seats	Leader
Front for Victory (39)	Front for Victory–PJ	36	Miguel Ángel Pichetto
Front for Victory (39)	La Pampa Justicialist	2	Daniel Aníbal Lovera
Front for Victory (39)	PARES	1	María Cristina del Valle Fiore Viñuales
Cambiemos (17)	Radical Civic Union	8	Ángel Rozas
Cambiemos (17)	PRO Front	6	Laura Elena Rodríguez Machado
Cambiemos (17)	Civic and Social Front of Catamarca	1	Oscar Aníbal Castillo
Cambiemos (17)	Progressive Font CC-ARI	1	María Magdalena Odarda
Cambiemos (17)	Santa Fe Federal	1	Carlos Reutemann
—	Civic Front for Santiago	2	Ada Itúrrez de Cappellini
Compromiso Federal (3)	San Luis Justicialist	2	Adolfo Rodríguez Saá
Compromiso Federal (3)	Production and Labour	1	Roberto Basualdo
United for a New Argentina (5)	Neuquén People's Movement	2	Guillermo Juan Pereyra
United for a New Argentina (5)	We Are All Chubut	1	Alfredo Héctor Luenzo
United for a New Argentina (5)	Union for Córdoba	1	Carlos Alberto Caserio
United for a New Argentina (5)	Fueguian People's Movement	1	Miriam Ruth Boyadjian
—	Federalism and Liberation	1	Carlos Saúl Menem
—	People's Front	1	Gerardo Antenor Montenegro
Progresistas (1)	Generation for a National Encounter	1	Jaime Linares
Federal Peronism (1)	October 8th Justicialist	1	Juan Carlos Romero
—	Misiones	1	Sandra Giménez
—	Proyecto Sur–UNEN	1	Fernando Solanas

== Election cycles ==
Election	Term	
Election	Start	End
2011	10 December 2011	9 December 2017
2013	10 December 2013	9 December 2019
2015	10 December 2015	9 December 2021

== List of senators ==
The table is sorted by provinces in alphabetical order, and then with their deputies in alphabetical order by their surnames. All deputies start their term on 10 December, and end it on 9 December of the corresponding years, except when noted.

- Senators that were elected for a new 6-year term in the 2017 elections.

Province	Portrait	Senator	Party	Term started	Term ends
Buenos Aires		Juan Manuel Abal Medina	Front for Victory–PJ	2014 (Note: Since 29 December 2014. Replaced Aníbal Fernández after his resignation on 16 December 2014 to become General Secretary of the Presidency.)	2017
Buenos Aires		María Laura Leguizamón	Front for Victory–PJ	2011	2017
Buenos Aires		Jaime Linares	Generation for a National Encounter	2011	2017
Buenos Aires City		Marta Gabriela Michetti	PRO Front	2013	2016 (Note: Resigned on 11 February 2016 to become Vice President. Replaced by Marta Varela.)
Buenos Aires City		Federico Pinedo	PRO Front	2015 (Note: Since 10 December 2015. Replaced Diego Santilli after he resigned to become Vice Chief of Government of Buenos Aires.)	2019
Buenos Aires City		Fernando Ezequiel "Pino" Solanas	Proyecto Sur - UNEN	2013	2019
Buenos Aires City		Marta Varela	PRO Front	2016 (Note: Since 11 February 2016. Replaced Gabriela Michetti after she resigned to become Vice President.)	2019
Catamarca		Inés Imelda Blas	Front for Victory–PJ	2015	2021
Catamarca		Oscar Aníbal Castillo	Civic and Social Front of Catamarca	2015	2021
Catamarca		Dalmacio Mera	Front for Victory–PJ	2015	2021
Chaco		Eduardo Alberto Aguilar	Front for Victory–PJ	2013	2019
Chaco		María Inés Pilatti Vergara	Front for Victory–PJ	2013	2019
Chaco		Ángel Rozas	Radical Civic Union	2013	2019
Chubut		Nancy Susana González	Front for Victory–PJ	2015	2021
Chubut		Alfredo Héctor Luenzo	We Are All Chubut	2015	2021
Chubut		Juan Mario Pais	Front for Victory–PJ	2015	2021
Córdoba		Carlos Alberto Caserio	Union for Córdoba	2015	2021
Córdoba		Ernesto Félix Martínez	PRO Front	2015	2021
Córdoba		Laura Elena Rodríguez Machado	PRO Front	2015	2021
Corrientes		Ana Claudia Almirón	Front for Victory–PJ	2015	2021
Corrientes		Néstor Pedro Braillard Poccard	PRO Front	2015	2021
Corrientes		Carlos Mauricio Espínola	Front for Victory–PJ	2015	2021
Entre Ríos		Alfredo Luis de Angeli	PRO Front	2013	2019
Entre Ríos		Pedro Guillermo Ángel Guastavino	Front for Victory–PJ	2013	2019
Entre Ríos		Sigrid Elisabeth Kunath	Front for Victory–PJ	2013	2019
Formosa		María Graciela de la Rosa	Front for Victory–PJ	2011	2017
Formosa		José Miguel Ángel Mayans	Front for Victory–PJ	2011	2017
Formosa		Luis Carlos Petcoff Naidenoff	Radical Civic Union	2011	2017
Jujuy		Walter Basilio Barrionuevo	Front for Victory–PJ	2011	2017
Jujuy		Liliana Beatriz Fellner	Front for Victory–PJ	2011	2017
Jujuy		Silvia del Rosario Giacoppo	Radical Civic Union	2015 (Note: Since 10 December 2015. Replaced Gerardo Morales after he resigned to become Governor of Jujuy.)	2017
La Pampa		Norma Haydée Durango	La Pampa Justicialist	2015	2021
La Pampa		Daniel Aníbal Lovera	La Pampa Justicialist	2015	2021
La Pampa		Juan Carlos Marino	Radical Civic Union	2015	2021
La Rioja		Hilda Clelia Aguirre	Front for Victory–PJ	2011	2017
La Rioja		Mirtha María Teresita Luna	Front for Victory–PJ	2011	2017
La Rioja		Carlos Saúl Menem	Federalism and Liberation	2011	2017
Mendoza		Julio César Cleto Cobos	Radical Civic Union	2015	2021
Mendoza		Anabel Fernández Sagasti	Front for Victory–PJ	2015	2021
Mendoza		Pamela Fernanda Verasay	Radical Civic Union	2015	2021
Misiones		Salvador Cabral	Front for Victory–PJ	2011	2017
Misiones		Sandra Daniela Giménez	Misiones	2011	2017
Misiones		Juan Manuel Irrazábal	Front for Victory–PJ	2011	2017
Neuquén		Carmen Lucila Crexell	Neuquén People's Movement	2013	2019
Neuquén		Marcelo Jorge Fuentes	Front for Victory–PJ	2013	2019
Neuquén		Guillermo Juan Pereyra	Neuquén People's Movement	2013	2019
Río Negro		Silvina Marcela García Larraburu	Front for Victory–PJ	2013	2019
Río Negro		María Magdalena Odarda	Progressive Font CC-ARI	2013	2019
Río Negro		Miguel Ángel Pichetto	Front for Victory–PJ	2013	2019
Salta		María Cristina del Valle Fiore Viñuales	PARES	2013	2019
Salta		Juan Carlos Romero	October 8th Justicialist	2013	2019
Salta		Rodolfo Julio Urtubey	Front for Victory–PJ	2013	2019
San Juan		Roberto Gustavo Basualdo	Production and Labour	2011	2017
San Juan		Ruperto Eduardo Godoy	Front for Victory–PJ	2011	2017
San Juan		Marina Raquel Riofrío	Front for Victory–PJ	2011	2017
San Luis		Liliana Teresita Negre de Alonso	San Luis Justicialist	2011	2017
San Luis		Daniel Raúl Pérsico	Front for Victory–PJ	2011	2017
San Luis		Adolfo Rodríguez Saá	San Luis Justicialist	2011	2017
Santa Cruz		Virginia María García	Front for Victory–PJ	2015 (Note: Since 10 December 2015. Replaced Pablo G. González after he resigned to become Vice Governor of Santa Cruz.)	2017
Santa Cruz		María Ester Labado	Front for Victory–PJ	2011	2017
Santa Cruz		Alfredo Anselmo Martínez	Radical Civic Union	2011	2017
Santa Fe		Omar Ángel Perotti	Front for Victory–PJ	2015	2021
Santa Fe		Carlos Alberto Reutemann	Federal Santa Fe	2015	2021
Santa Fe		María de los Ángeles Sacnun	Front for Victory–PJ	2015	2021
Santiago del Estero		Ada Rosa Del Valle Itúrrez de Cappellini	Civic Front for Santiago	2013	2019
Santiago del Estero		Gerardo Antenor Montenegro	People's Front	2013	2019
Santiago del Estero		Gerardo Zamora	Civic Front for Santiago	2013	2017 (Note: Resigned on 9 December 2017 to become Governor of Santiago del Estero. Replaced by Blanca Porcel de Riccobelli.)
Tierra del Fuego		Miriam Ruth Boyadjian	Fueguian People's Movement	2015 (Note: Since 16 September 2015. Replaced Jorge Alberto Garramuño after his death on 7 September 2015.)	2019
Tierra del Fuego		Julio César Catalán Magni	Front for Victory–PJ	2013	2019
Tierra del Fuego		José Anatolio Ojeda	Front for Victory–PJ	2015 (Note: Since 10 December 2015. Replaced Rosana Bertone after she resigned to become Governor of Tierra del Fuego.)	2019
Tucumán		José Jorge Alperovich	Front for Victory–PJ	2015	2021
Tucumán		Silvia Beatriz Elías de Pérez	Radical Civic Union	2015	2021
Tucumán		Beatriz Graciela Mirkin	Front for Victory–PJ	2015	2021

== See also ==
- List of current Argentine deputies
- List of former Argentine Senators
