= List of Argentine senators, 2017–2019 =

This is a list of members of the Argentine Senate from 10 December 2017 to 9 December 2019.

== Composition ==
Alliance	Party	Leader
Cambiemos (25)	Unión Cívica Radical (12)	Luis Petcoff Naidenoff
Cambiemos (25)	Frente PRO (9)	Luis Petcoff Naidenoff
Cambiemos (25)	Frente Cívico y Social de Catamarca (1)	Luis Petcoff Naidenoff
Cambiemos (25)	Avanzar San Luis (1)	Luis Petcoff Naidenoff
Cambiemos (25)	Producción y Trabajo (1)	Luis Petcoff Naidenoff
Cambiemos (25)	Fuegian People's Movement (1)	Luis Petcoff Naidenoff
Argentina Federal (24)	Justicialista (21)	Miguel Ángel Pichetto
Argentina Federal (24)	Partido Justicialista La Pampa (2)	Miguel Ángel Pichetto
Argentina Federal (24)	Justicialista Chubut (1)	Miguel Ángel Pichetto
Argentina Federal (24)	Chubut Somos Todos (1)	Miguel Ángel Pichetto
Frente para la Victoria-PJ (9)		Marcelo Fuentes
Parlamentario Federal (5)	Movimiento Popular Neuquino (2)	Juan Carlos Romero
Parlamentario Federal (5)	Justicialista 8 de Octubre (1)	Juan Carlos Romero
Parlamentario Federal (5)	Pares (1)	Juan Carlos Romero
Parlamentario Federal (5)	Santa Fe Federal (1)	Juan Carlos Romero
Unidad Justicialista (2)		Adolfo Rodríguez Saá
Frente Cívico por Santiago (2)		Ada Itúrrez de Cappellini
Misiones (2)		Magdalena Solari Quintana
One deputy parties (3)	Frente Popular (1)	Gerardo Antenor Montenegro
One deputy parties (3)	Proyecto Sur - UNEN (1)	Fernando Ezequiel "Pino" Solanas
One deputy parties (3)	Río-Frente Progresista (1)	Magdalena Odarda

== Election cycles ==
Election	Term	
Election	Start	End
2013	10 December 2013	9 December 2019
2015	10 December 2015	9 December 2021
2017	10 December 2017	9 December 2023

== List of senators ==
The table is sorted by provinces in alphabetical order, and then with their senators in alphabetical order by their surnames. All senators start their term on December 10, and end it on December 9 of the corresponding years, except when noted.

Province	Portrait	Senator	Party	Term started	Term ends
Buenos Aires		Esteban José Bullrich	Frente PRO	2017	2021 (Note: Resigned on 9 December 2021. Replaced by José Torello.)
Buenos Aires		Cristina Elisabet Fernández de Kirchner	Frente para la Victoria-PJ	2017	2019 (Note: Resigned on 27 November 2019 after assuming the Vice Presidency. Replaced by Jorge Taiana.)
Buenos Aires		Gladys Esther González	Frente PRO	2017 (Note: Since 27 December 2017.)	2023
Buenos Aires City		Federico Pinedo	Frente PRO	2015 (Note: Since 10 December 2015. Replaced Diego Santilli after he resigned to become Vice Chief of Government of Buenos Aires.)	2019
Buenos Aires City		Fernando Ezequiel "Pino" Solanas	Proyecto Sur - UNEN	2013	2019
Buenos Aires City		Marta Varela	Frente PRO	2016 (Note: Since 11 February 2016. Replaced Gabriela Michetti after she resigned to become Vice President.)	2019
Catamarca		Inés Imelda Blas	Justicialista	2015	2021
Catamarca		Oscar Aníbal Castillo	Frente Cívico y Social de Catamarca	2015	2021
Catamarca		Dalmacio Mera	Justicialista	2015	2021
Chaco		Eduardo Alberto Aguilar	Justicialista	2013	2019
Chaco		María Inés Pilatti Vergara	Frente para la Victoria-PJ	2013	2019
Chaco		Ángel Rozas	Unión Cívica Radical	2013	2019
Chubut		Nancy Susana González	Frente para la Victoria-PJ	2015	2021
Chubut		Alfredo Héctor Luenzo	Chubut Somos Todos	2015	2021
Chubut		Juan Mario Pais	Justicialista Chubut	2015	2021
Córdoba		Carlos Alberto Caserio	Justicialista	2015	2021
Córdoba		Ernesto Félix Martínez	Frente PRO	2015	2021
Córdoba		Laura Elena Rodríguez Machado	Frente PRO	2015	2021
Corrientes		Ana Claudia Almirón	Frente para la Victoria-PJ	2015	2021
Corrientes		Néstor Pedro Braillard Poccard	Frente PRO	2015	2021
Corrientes		Carlos Mauricio Espínola	Justicialista	2015	2021
Entre Ríos		Alfredo Luis de Angeli	Frente PRO	2013	2019
Entre Ríos		Pedro Guillermo Ángel Guastavino	Justicialista	2013	2019
Entre Ríos		Sigrid Elisabeth Kunath	Justicialista	2013	2019
Formosa		María Teresa Margarita González	Justicialista	2017	2023
Formosa		José Miguel Ángel Mayans	Justicialista	2017	2023
Formosa		Luis Carlos Petcoff Naidenoff	Unión Cívica Radical	2017	2023
Jujuy		Mario Raymundo Fiad	Unión Cívica Radical	2017	2023
Jujuy		Silvia del Rosario Giacoppo	Unión Cívica Radical	2017	2023
Jujuy		Guillermo Eugenio Mario Snopek	Justicialista	2017	2023
La Pampa		Norma Haydée Durango	Justicialista La Pampa	2015	2021
La Pampa		Daniel Aníbal Lovera	Justicialista La Pampa	2015	2021
La Pampa		Juan Carlos Marino	Unión Cívica Radical	2015	2021
La Rioja		Olga Inés Brizuela y Doria	Unión Cívica Radical	2017	2019 (Note: Resigned on 10 December 2019. Replaced by María Clara del Valle Vega.)
La Rioja		Julio César Martínez	Unión Cívica Radical	2017	2023
La Rioja		Carlos Saúl Menem	Justicialista	2017	2021 (Note: Died on 14 February 2021. Replaced by Ricardo Guerra.)
Mendoza		Julio César Cleto Cobos	Unión Cívica Radical	2015	2021
Mendoza		Anabel Fernández Sagasti	Frente para la Victoria-PJ	2015	2021
Mendoza		Pamela Fernanda Verasay	Unión Cívica Radical	2015	2021
Misiones		Maurice Fabián Closs	Misiones	2017	2023
Misiones		Humberto Luis Arturo Schiavoni	Frente PRO	2017	2023
Misiones		Magdalena Solari Quintana	Misiones	2017	2023
Neuquén		Carmen Lucila Crexell	Movimiento Popular Neuquino	2013	2019
Neuquén		Marcelo Jorge Fuentes	Frente para la Victoria-PJ	2013	2019
Neuquén		Guillermo Juan Pereyra	Movimiento Popular Neuquino	2013	2019
Río Negro		Silvina Marcela García Larraburu	Frente para la Victoria-PJ	2013	2019
Río Negro		María Magdalena Odarda	Río-Frente Progresista	2013	2019
Río Negro		Miguel Ángel Pichetto	Justicialista	2013	2019
Salta		María Cristina del Valle Fiore Viñuales	Pares	2013	2019
Salta		Juan Carlos Romero	Justicialista 8 de Octubre	2013	2019
Salta		Rodolfo Julio Urtubey	Justicialista	2013	2019
San Juan		Roberto Gustavo Basualdo	Producción y Trabajo	2017	2023
San Juan		Cristina del Carmen López de Abarca	Justicialista	2017	2023
San Juan		José Rubén Uñac	Justicialista	2017	2023
San Luis		María Eugenia Catalfamo	Unidad Justicialista	2017	2023
San Luis		Claudio Javier Poggi	Avanzar San Luis	2017	2023
San Luis		Adolfo Rodríguez Saá	Unidad Justicialista	2017	2023
Santa Cruz		Eduardo Raúl Costa	Unión Cívica Radical	2017	2023
Santa Cruz		Ana María Ianni	Frente para la Victoria-PJ	2017	2023
Santa Cruz		María Belén Tapia	Unión Cívica Radical	2017	2023
Santa Fe		Omar Ángel Perotti	Justicialista	2015	2019 (Note: Resigned on 10 December 2021 to become Governor of Santa Fe. Replaced by Roberto Mirabella.)
Santa Fe		Carlos Alberto Reutemann	Santa Fe Federal	2015	2021 (Note: Died on 7 July 2021. Replaced by Alejandra Vucasovich.)
Santa Fe		María de los Ángeles Sacnun	Frente para la Victoria-PJ	2015	2021
Santiago del Estero		Ada Rosa Del Valle Itúrrez de Cappellini	Frente Cívico por Santiago	2013	2019
Santiago del Estero		Gerardo Antenor Montenegro	Frente Popular	2013	2019
Santiago del Estero		Blanca Porcel de Riccobelli	Frente Cívico por Santiago	2017 (Note: Since 10 December 2017. Replaced Gerardo Zamora after he resigned to become Governor of Santiago del Estero.)	2019
Tierra del Fuego		Miriam Ruth Boyadjian	Fuegian People's Movement	2015 (Note: Since 16 September 2015. Replaced Jorge Alberto Garramuño after his death on 7 September 2015.)	2019
Tierra del Fuego		Julio César Catalán Magni	Justicialista	2013	2019
Tierra del Fuego		José Anatolio Ojeda	Justicialista	2015 (Note: Since 10 December 2015. Replaced Rosana Bertone after she resigned to become Governor of Tierra del Fuego.)	2019
Tucumán		José Jorge Alperovich	Justicialista	2015	2021
Tucumán		Silvia Beatriz Elías de Pérez	Unión Cívica Radical	2015	2021
Tucumán		Beatriz Graciela Mirkin	Justicialista	2015	2021
