= List of Argentine senators, 2013–2015 =

This is list of members of the Argentine Senate from 10 December 2013 to 9 December 2015.

== Composition ==
as of 9 December 2015

Bloc	Seats	Leader
Front for Victory–PJ	32	Miguel Ángel Pichetto
Radical Civic Union	11	Gerardo Morales
PRO	3	Gabriela Michetti
Civic Front of Córdoba	2	Luis Juez
Civic Front for Santiago	2	Ada Itúrrez de Cappellini
Civic and Social Front of Catamarca	2	Oscar Castillo
Neuquén People's Movement	2	Guillermo Juan Pereyra
San Luis Justicialist	2	Liliana Negre de Alonso
Federal Santa Fe	1	Carlos Reutemann
Federalism and Liberty	1	Carlos Saúl Menem
Front for All	1	José María Roldán
Fueguian People's Movement	1	Miriam Ruth Boyadjian
GEN	1	Jaime Linares
Labour and Dignity	1	Gabriela Di Perna
Liberal Party of Corrientes	1	Josefina Meabe
October 8 Justicialist	1	Juan Carlos Romero
People's Front	1	Gerardo Antenor Montenegro
Production and Labour	1	Roberto Basualdo
Progressive Front	1	Magdalena Odarda
Project South UNEN	1	Fernando Solanas
Santa Fe Federalism	1	Roxana Latorre
Socialist Party	1	Rubén Giustiniani
Source: senado.gov.ar (archive)

== Senate leadership ==
Title	Officeholder	Bloc	Province
President of the Senate (Note: Ex officio as Vice President of Argentina.)	Amado Boudou	Front for Victory–PJ	Autonomous City of Buenos Aires
Provisional President	Beatriz Rojkés de Alperovich (until 2014)	Front for Victory–PJ	Tucumán
Provisional President	Gerardo Zamora (from 2014)	Civic Front for Santiago	Santiago del Estero
Vice President	Juan Carlos Marino	Radical Civic Union	La Pampa
First Vice President	Luis Juez	Civic Front of Córdoba	Córdoba
Second Vice President	Juan Carlos Romero	October 8th Justicialist	Salta

== Election cycles ==
Election	Term	
Election	Start	End
2009	10 December 2009	9 December 2015
2011	10 December 2011	9 December 2017
2013	10 December 2013	9 December 2019

== List of senators ==
Province	Senator	Party	Term	
Province	Senator	Party	From	To
Buenos Aires Province	Juan Manuel Abal Medina	Front for Victory–PJ	2014 (Note: Since 29 December 2014. Replaced Aníbal Fernández.)	2017
Buenos Aires Province	Aníbal Domingo Fernández	Front for Victory–PJ	2011	2014 (Note: Until 16 December 2014. Resigned to take office as General Secretary of the Presidency. Replaced by Juan Manuel Abal Medina.)
Buenos Aires Province	María Laura Leguizamón	Front for Victory–PJ	2011	2017
Buenos Aires Province	Jaime Linares	GEN	2011	2017
Buenos Aires	Marta Gabriela Michetti	PRO	2013	2015 (Note: Resigned on 10 December 2015 to take office as Vice President of Argentina. Replaced by Marta Varela.)
Buenos Aires	Diego César Santilli	PRO	2013	2015 (Note: Resigned on 10 December 2015 to take office as Deputy Chief of Government of Buenos Aires. Replaced by Federico Pinedo.)
Buenos Aires	Fernando Ezequiel "Pino" Solanas	Project South UNEN	2019	2025
Catamarca	Inés Imelda Blas	Front for Victory–PJ	2011 (Note: Since 1 December 2011. Replaced Lucía Corpacci.)	2015
Catamarca	Oscar Aníbal Castillo	Civic and Social Front of Catamarca	2009	2015
Catamarca	Blanca María del Valle Monllau	Civic and Social Front of Catamarca	2009	2015
Chaco	Eduardo Alberto Aguilar	Front for Victory–PJ	2013	2019
Chaco	Ángel Rozas	Radical Civic Union	2013	2019
Chaco	María Inés Pilatti Vergara	Front for Victory–PJ	2013	2019
Chubut	Marcelo Alejandro Horacio Guinle	Front for Victory–PJ	2009	2015
Chubut	Mario Jorge Cimadevilla	Radical Civic Union	2009	2015
Chubut	Graciela Di Perna	Labour and Dignity	2009	2015
Córdoba	Marta Borello	Radical Civic Union	2009	2015
Córdoba	Luis Alberto Juez	Civic Front of Córdoba	2009	2015
Córdoba	Norma Elena Morandini	Civic Front of Córdoba	2009	2015
Corrientes	Eugenio Justiniano Artaza	Radical Civic Union	2009	2015
Corrientes	Josefina Angélica Meabe	Liberal Party of Corrientes	2009	2015
Corrientes	José María Roldán	Front for All	2009	2015
Entre Ríos	Alfredo Luis de Angeli	PRO	2013	2019
Entre Ríos	Pedro Guillermo Ángel Guastavino	Front for Victory–PJ	2013	2019
Entre Ríos	Sigrid Elizabeth Kunath	Front for Victory–PJ	2013	2019
Formosa	María Graciela de la Rosa	Front for Victory–PJ	2011	2017
Formosa	José Miguel Ángel Mayans	Front for Victory–PJ	2011	2017
Formosa	Luis Carlos Petcoff Naidenoff	Radical Civic Union	2011	2017
Jujuy	Walter Basilio Barrionuevo	Front for Victory–PJ	2011	2017
Jujuy	Liliana Beatriz Fellner	Front for Victory–PJ	2011	2017
Jujuy	Gerardo Rubén Morales	Radical Civic Union	2011	2017
La Pampa	María de los Ángeles Higonet	La Pampa Justicialist	2009	2015
La Pampa	Carlos Alberto Verna	La Pampa Justicialist	2009	2015
La Pampa	Juan Carlos Marino	Radical Civic Union	2009	2015
La Rioja	Hilda Clelia Aguirre de Soria	Front for Victory–PJ	2011	2017
La Rioja	Mirtha María Teresita Luna	Front for Victory–PJ	2011	2017
La Rioja	Carlos Saúl Menem	Federalism and Liberty	2011	2017
Mendoza	Rolando Adolfo Bermejo	Front for Victory–PJ	2009	2015
Mendoza	Laura Gisela Montero	Radical Civic Union	2009	2015
Mendoza	Ernesto Sanz	Radical Civic Union	2009	2015
Misiones	Salvador Cabral	Front for Victory–PJ	2011	2017
Misiones	Sandra Daniela Giménez	Front for Victory–PJ	2011	2017
Misiones	Juan Manuel Irrazábal	Front for Victory–PJ	2011	2017
Neuquén	Carmen Lucila Crexell	Neuquén People's Movement	2013	2019
Neuquén	Marcelo Jorge Fuentes	Front for Victory–PJ	2013	2019
Neuquén	Guillermo Juan Pereyra	Neuquén People's Movement	2013	2019
Río Negro	Silvina Marcela García Larraburu	Front for Victory–PJ	2013	2019
Río Negro	María Magdalena Odarda	Progressive Front	2013	2019
Río Negro	Miguel Ángel Pichetto	Front for Victory–PJ	2013	2019
Salta	María Cristina del Valle Fiore Viñuales	Front for Victory–PJ	2013	2019
Salta	Rodolfo Julio Urtubey	Front for Victory–PJ	2013	2019
Salta	Juan Carlos Romero	October 8th Justicialist	2013	2019
San Juan	Roberto Gustavo Basualdo	Production and Labour	2011	2017
San Juan	Ruperto Eduardo Godoy	Front for Victory–PJ	2011	2017
San Juan	Marina Raquel Riofrío	Front for Victory–PJ	2011	2017
San Luis	Liliana Negre de Alonso	San Luis Justicialist	2011	2017
San Luis	Daniel Raúl Pérsico	Front for Victory–PJ	2011	2017
San Luis	Adolfo Rodríguez Saá	San Luis Justicialist	2011	2017
Santa Cruz	Pablo Gerardo González	Front for Victory–PJ	2011	2017
Santa Cruz	María Ester Labado	Front for Victory–PJ	2011	2017
Santa Cruz	Alfredo Anselmo Martínez	Radical Civic Union	2011	2017
Santa Fe	Rubén Héctor Giustiniani	Socialist Party	2009	2015
Santa Fe	Roxana Itatí Latorre	Santa Fe Federalism	2009	2015
Santa Fe	Carlos Alberto Reutemann	Federal Santa Fe	2009	2015
Santiago del Estero	Ada Rosa del Valle Itúrrez de Cappellini	Civic Front for Santiago	2013	2019
Santiago del Estero	Gerardo Antenor Montenegro	People's Front	2013	2019
Santiago del Estero	Gerardo Zamora	Civic Front for Santiago	2013	2019
Tierra del Fuego	Rosana Andrea Bertone	Front for Victory–PJ	2013	2019
Tierra del Fuego	Miriam Ruth Boyadjian	Fueguian People's Movement	2015 (Note: Since 16 September 2015. Replaced Joge Alberto Garramuño.)	2019
Tierra del Fuego	Julio César Catalán Magni	Front for Victory–PJ	2013	2019
Tierra del Fuego	Jorge Alberto Garramuño	Fueguian People's Movement	2013	2015 (Note: Died on 7 September 2015. Replaced by Miriam Ruth Boyadjian.)
Tucumán	José Manuel Cano	Radical Civic Union	2009	2013 (Note: Until 10 December 2013. Resigned to take office as a National Deputy.)
Tucumán	Silvia Beatriz Elías de Pérez	Radical Civic Union	2013 (Note: From 18 December 2013. Replaced José Manuel Cano.)	2015
Tucumán	Sergio Francisco Mansilla	Front for Victory–PJ	2009	2015
Tucumán	Beatriz Liliana Rojkés de Alperovich	Front for Victory–PJ	2009	2015
