= List of Argentine senators, 2019–2021 =

This is list of members of the Argentine Senate from 10 December 2019 to 9 December 2021.

== Composition ==
Bloc	Parties	Presidents
Frente de Todos (41)		José Mayans
Juntos por el Cambio (26) (President: Luis Petcoff Naidenoff)	Radical Civic Union (14)	Luis Petcoff Naidenoff
Juntos por el Cambio (26) (President: Luis Petcoff Naidenoff)	PRO Front (8)	Humberto Schiavoni
Juntos por el Cambio (26) (President: Luis Petcoff Naidenoff)	Civic and Social Front of Catamarca (1)	Oscar Castillo
Juntos por el Cambio (26) (President: Luis Petcoff Naidenoff)	Advance San Luis (1)	Claudio Poggi
Juntos por el Cambio (26) (President: Luis Petcoff Naidenoff)	Production and Labour (1)	Roberto Basualdo
Federal Parliamentarian (4) (President: Juan Carlos Romero)	Federal Santa Fe (1)	Alejandra Vucasovich
Federal Parliamentarian (4) (President: Juan Carlos Romero)	October 8th Justicialist (1)	Juan Carlos Romero
Federal Parliamentarian (4) (President: Juan Carlos Romero)	Mediate Argentina (1)	Clara Vega
Federal Parliamentarian (4) (President: Juan Carlos Romero)	Neuquén Movement (1)	Carmen Lucila Crexell
Front for the Renewal of Concord (1)		Magdalena Solari
Together We Are Río Negro (1)		Alberto Weretilneck

== Senate leadership ==
Title	Officeholder	Caucus	Province
President of the Senate (Note: Ex officio as Vice President of Argentina.)	Cristina Fernández de Kirchner	Frente de Todos	Buenos Aires Province
Provisional President	Claudia Ledesma Abdala	Frente de Todos	Santiago del Estero
Vice President	Martín Lousteau	Juntos por el Cambio	Autonomous City of Buenos Aires
First Vice President	Maurice Closs	Frente de Todos	Misiones
Second Vice President	Laura Rodríguez Machado	Juntos por el Cambio	Córdoba

== Election cycles ==
Election	Term	
Election	Start	End
2015	10 December 2015	9 December 2021
2017	10 December 2017	9 December 2023
2019	10 December 2019	9 December 2025

== List of senators ==
Province	Photo	Senator	Party	Term	
Province	Photo	Senator	Party	From	To
Buenos Aires		Esteban José Bullrich	PRO Front	2017	2021 (Note: Resigned on 9 December 2021. Replaced by José Torello.)
Buenos Aires		Gladys González	PRO Front	2017	2023
Buenos Aires		Juliana Di Tullio	Frente de Todos	2021 (Note: Since 19 August 2021. Replaced Jorge Taiana.)	2023
Buenos Aires		Jorge Enrique Taiana	Frente de Todos	2019 (Note: Since 10 December 2019. Replaced Cristina Fernández de Kirchner after she resigned to assume the vice presidency)	2021 (Note: Resigned on 10 August 2021 to become Minister of Defense. Replaced by Juliana Di Tullio.)
Buenos Aires City		Martín Lousteau	Radical Civic Union	2019	2025
Buenos Aires City		Mariano Recalde	Frente de Todos	2019	2025
Buenos Aires City		Guadalupe Tagliaferri	PRO Front	2019	2025
Catamarca		Inés Imelda Blas	Frente de Todos	2015	2021
Catamarca		Oscar Aníbal Castillo	Civic and Social Front of Catamarca	2015	2021
Catamarca		Dalmacio Mera Figueroa	Frente de Todos	2015	2021
Chaco		María Inés Pilatti Vergara	Frente de Todos	2019	2025
Chaco		Antonio José Rodas	Frente de Todos	2019	2025
Chaco		Víctor Zimmermann	Radical Civic Union	2019	2025
Chubut		Nancy Susana González	Frente de Todos	2015	2021
Chubut		Alfredo Héctor Luenzo	Frente de Todos	2015	2021
Chubut		Juan Mario Pais	Frente de Todos	2015	2021
Córdoba		Carlos Alberto Caserio	Frente de Todos	2015	2021
Córdoba		Ernesto Félix Martínez	PRO Front	2015	2021
Córdoba		Laura Elena Rodríguez Machado	PRO Front	2015	2021
Corrientes		Ana Claudia Almirón	Frente de Todos	2015	2021
Corrientes		Néstor Pedro Braillard Poccard	PRO Front	2015	2021
Corrientes		Carlos Mauricio Espínola	Frente de Todos	2015	2021
Entre Ríos		Alfredo Luis de Angeli	PRO Front	2019	2025
Entre Ríos		Edgardo Darío Kueider	Frente de Todos	2019	2025
Entre Ríos		Stella Maris Elisa Olalla de Moreira	Radical Civic Union	2019	2025
Formosa		María Teresa Margarita González	Frente de Todos	2017	2023
Formosa		José Miguel Ángel Mayans	Frente de Todos	2017	2023
Formosa		Luis Carlos Petcoff Naidenoff	Radical Civic Union	2017	2023
Jujuy		Mario Raymundo Fiad	Radical Civic Union	2017	2023
Jujuy		Silvia del Rosario Giacoppo	Radical Civic Union	2017	2023
Jujuy		Guillermo Eugenio Mario Snopek	Frente de Todos	2017	2023
La Pampa		Norma Haydée Durango	Frente de Todos	2015	2021
La Pampa		Daniel Aníbal Lovera	Frente de Todos	2015	2021
La Pampa		Juan Carlos Marino	Radical Civic Union	2015	2021
La Rioja		Ricardo Antonio Guerra	Frente de Todos	2021 (Note: Since 24 February 2021. Replaced Carlos Menem.)	2023
La Rioja		Julio César Martínez	Radical Civic Union	2017	2023
La Rioja		Carlos Saúl Menem	Frente de Todos	2017	2021 (Note: Died on 14 February 2021)
La Rioja		María Clara del Valle Vega	Mediate Argentina	2019 (Note: Since 20 December 2019. Replaced Inés Brizuela y Doria.)	2023
Mendoza		Julio César Cleto Cobos	Radical Civic Union	2015	2021
Mendoza		Anabel Fernández Sagasti	Frente de Todos	2015	2021
Mendoza		Pamela Fernanda Verasay	Radical Civic Union	2015	2021
Misiones		Maurice Fabián Closs	Frente de Todos	2017	2023
Misiones		Humberto Luis Arturo Schiavoni	PRO Front	2017	2023
Misiones		Magdalena Solari Quintana	Front for the Renewal of Concord	2017	2023
Neuquén		Carmen Lucila Crexell	Neuquén Movement	2019	2025
Neuquén		Oscar Isidro Parrilli	Frente de Todos	2019	2025
Neuquén		Silvia Estela Sapag	Frente de Todos	2019	2025
Río Negro		Claudio Martín Doñate	Frente de Todos	2019	2025
Río Negro		Silvina Marcela García Larraburu	Frente de Todos	2019	2025
Río Negro		Alberto Edgardo Weretilneck	Together We Are Río Negro	2019	2025
Salta		Nora del Valle Giménez	Frente de Todos	2019	2025
Salta		Sergio Napoleón Leavy	Frente de Todos	2019	2025
Salta		Juan Carlos Romero	Justicialista 8 de Octubre	2019	2025
San Juan		Roberto Gustavo Basualdo	Production and Labour	2017	2023
San Juan		Cristina del Carmen López Valverde	Frente de Todos	2017	2023
San Juan		José Rubén Uñac	Frente de Todos	2017	2023
San Luis		María Eugenia Catalfamo	Frente de Todos	2017	2023
San Luis		Claudio Javier Poggi	Advance San Luis	2017	2023
San Luis		Adolfo Rodríguez Saá	Frente de Todos	2017	2023
Santa Cruz		Eduardo Raúl Costa	Radical Civic Union	2017	2023
Santa Cruz		Ana María Ianni	Frente de Todos	2017	2023
Santa Cruz		María Belén Tapia	Radical Civic Union	2017	2023
Santa Fe		Roberto Mario Mirabella	Frente de Todos	2019 (Note: Since 10 December 2021. Replaced Omar Perotti.)	2021
Santa Fe		Carlos Alberto Reutemann	Santa Fe Federal	2015	2021 (Note: Died on 7 July 2021. Replaced by Alejandra Vucasovich.)
Santa Fe		María de los Ángeles Sacnun	Frente de Todos	2015	2021
Santa Fe		Maria Alejandra Vucasovich	Santa Fe Federal	2021 (Note: Since 15 July 2021. Replaced Carlos Reutemann.)	2021
Santiago del Estero		Claudia Alejandra Ledesma Abdala	Frente de Todos	2019	2025
Santiago del Estero		Gerardo Antenor Montenegro	Frente de Todos	2019	2025
Santiago del Estero		José Emilio Neder	Frente de Todos	2019	2025
Tierra del Fuego		Pablo Daniel Blanco	Radical Civic Union	2019	2025
Tierra del Fuego		María Eugenia Duré	Frente de Todos	2019	2025
Tierra del Fuego		Matías David Rodríguez	Frente de Todos	2019	2025
Tucumán		José Jorge Alperovich	Frente de Todos	2015	2021
Tucumán		Silvia Beatriz Elías de Pérez	Radical Civic Union	2015	2021
Tucumán		Beatriz Graciela Mirkin	Frente de Todos	2015	2021
