= 2017 Argentine legislative election =

- 22 October 2017
- Chamber of Deputies
- 127 of the 257 seats in the Chamber of Deputies
- Turnout: 76.82%
Party	Vote %	Seats
Cambiemos	41.75	61
Citizen's Unity–Front for Victory	25.21	32
Justicialist Front	13.59	22
1País	5.97	4
Workers' Left Front	4.70	2
Socialist Party	1.74	1
Evolución	0.96	2
Intransigent Party	0.75	1
Chubut for Everybody Front	0.41	1
Neuquén People's Movement	0.33	1
This lists parties that won seats. See the complete results below.
- Senate
- 24 of the 72 seats in the Senate
- Turnout: 78.73%
Party	Leader	Vote %	Seats
Cambiemos		41.01	12
Citizen's Unity–Front for Victory		34.24	6
Justicialist Front		8.92	6
This lists parties that won seats. See the complete results below.
Results by province; Chamber of Deputies (left) and Senate (right)

Legislative elections were held in Argentina on 22 October 2017 to elect half of the Chamber of Deputies and one third of the Senate. The result was a victory for the ruling Cambiemos alliance, being the most voted force in 13 of the 24 districts.

== Background ==
The elections took place during the presidency of Mauricio Macri whose Cambiemos coalition also governed the City of Buenos Aires and Buenos Aires Province. As Cambiemos was a new coalition with few noteworthy political figures, several members of the cabinet were asked to resign from their positions and run for Congress in their respective districts instead.

Peronist factions were divided in two main groups; the Citizen's Unity, led by the former president Cristina Kirchner, led the parliamentary opposition to Macri's administration. Another group was composed of politicians from the Justicialist Party and the Renewal Front.

== Electoral system ==
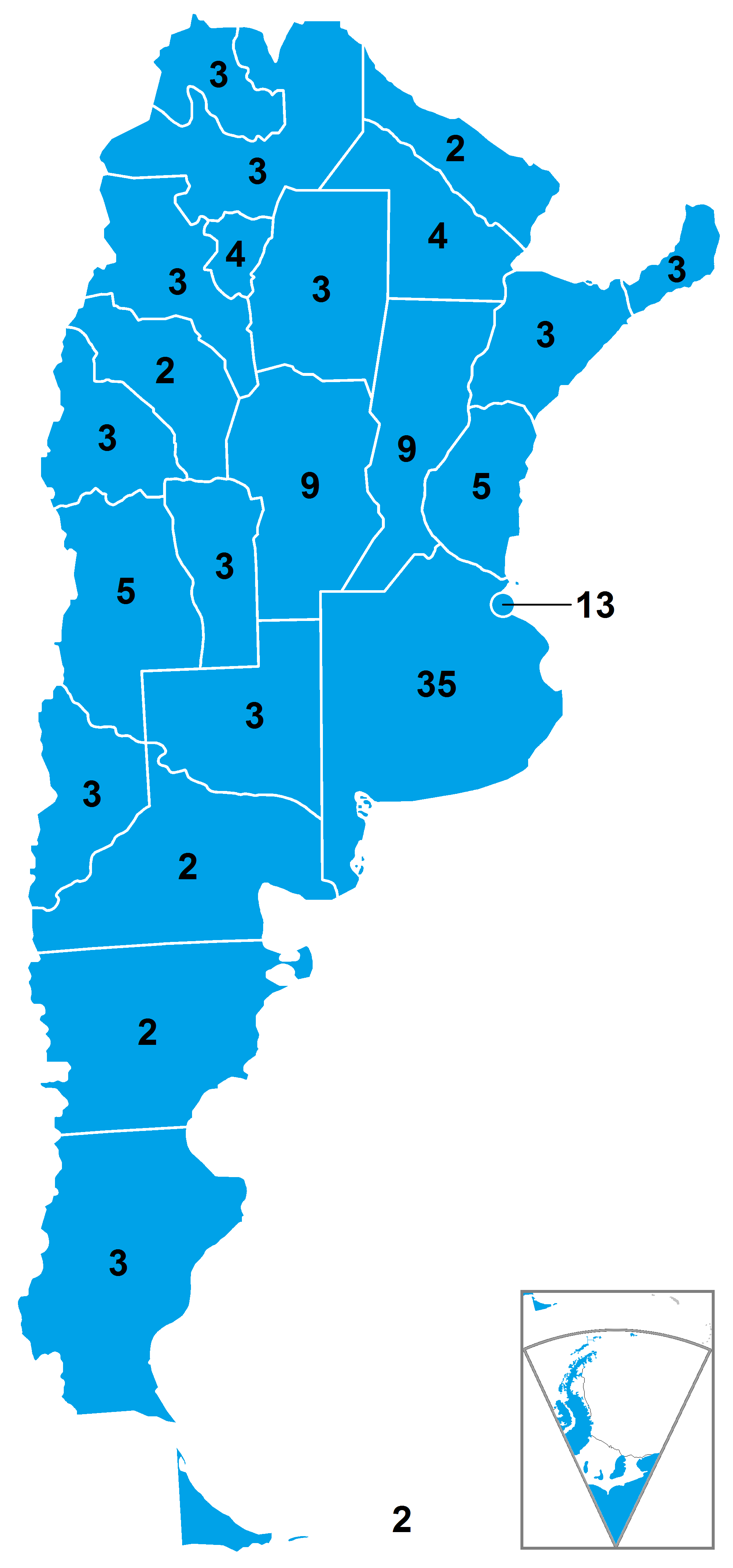
Number of Deputies at stake in each district.

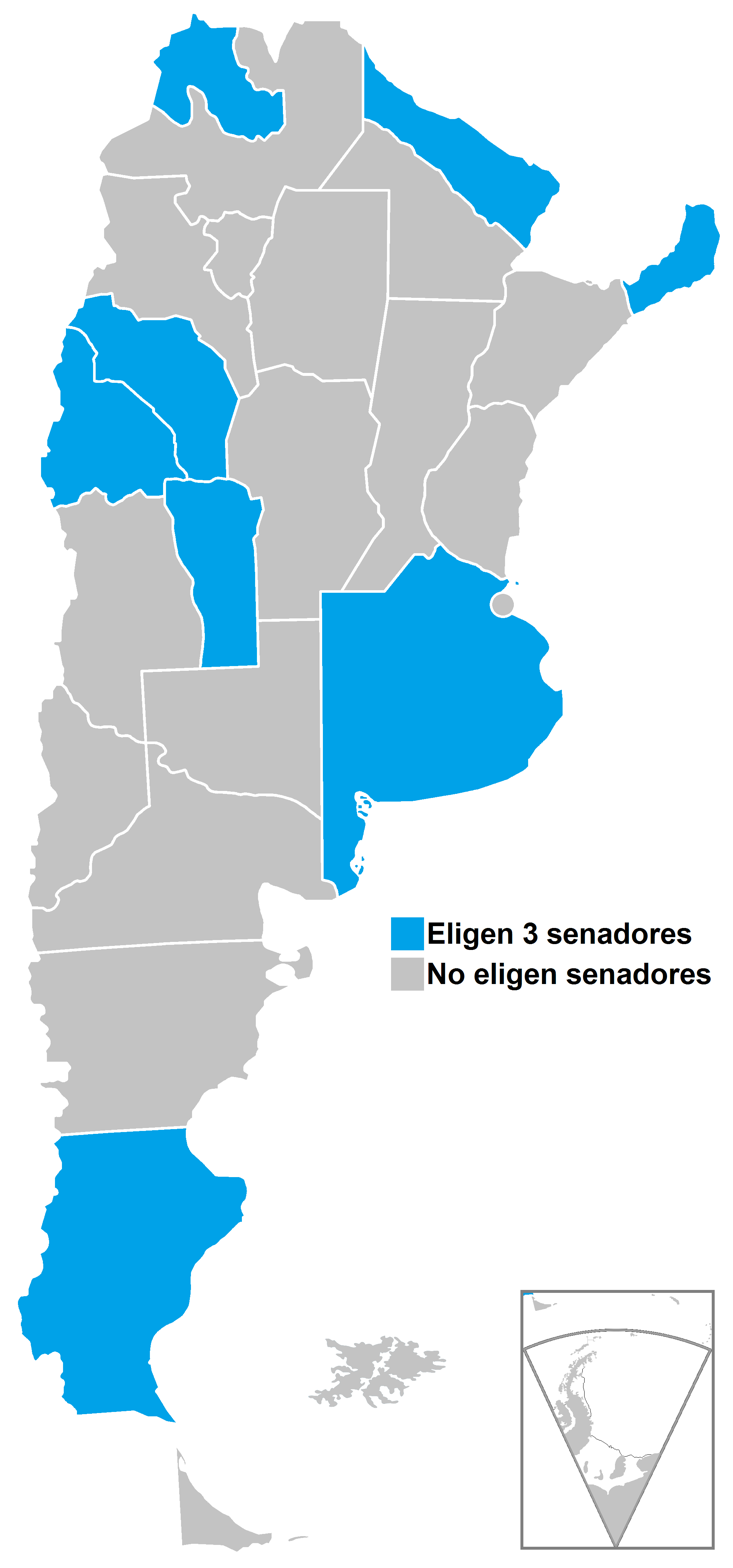
Provinces that will elect Senators in blue.

=== Chamber of Deputies ===
The 257 members of the Chamber of Deputies are elected by proportional representation in 24 multi-member constituencies based on the provinces (plus the City of Buenos Aires). Seats are allocated using the d'Hondt method with a 3% electoral threshold. In this election, 127 of the 257 seats are up for renewal for a four-year term.

Province	Seats	Seats at stake
Buenos Aires	70	35
City of Buenos Aires	25	13
Catamarca	5	3
Chaco	7	4
Chubut	5	2
Córdoba	18	9
Corrientes	7	3
Entre Ríos	9	5
Formosa	5	2
Jujuy	6	3
La Pampa	5	3
La Rioja	5	2
Mendoza	10	5
Misiones	7	3
Neuquén	5	3
Río Negro	5	2
Salta	7	3
San Juan	6	3
San Luis	5	3
Santa Cruz	5	3
Santa Fe	19	9
Santiago del Estero	7	3
Tierra del Fuego	5	2
Tucumán	9	4
Total	257	127

Outgoing Deputies
Province	Deputy	Party
Buenos Aires	Gilberto Oscar Alegre	Federal Unidos por una Nueva Argentina
Buenos Aires	Ricardo Luis Alfonsín	Radical Civic Union
Buenos Aires	Horacio Fernando Alonso	Federal Unidos por una Nueva Argentina
Buenos Aires	Gustavo Héctor Arrieta	Front for Victory-PJ
Buenos Aires	Remo Gerardo Carlotto	Peronismo para la Victoria
Buenos Aires	Franco Agustín Caviglia	Juntos por Argentina
Buenos Aires	Luis Francisco Jorge Cigogna	Front for Victory-PJ
Buenos Aires	Diana Beatriz Conti	Front for Victory-PJ
Buenos Aires	Verónica Carolina Couly	Federal Unidos por una Nueva Argentina
Buenos Aires	Héctor Ricardo Daer	Federal Unidos por una Nueva Argentina
Buenos Aires	José Ignacio de Mendiguren	Federal Unidos por una Nueva Argentina
Buenos Aires	Edgardo Fernando Depetri	Front for Victory-PJ
Buenos Aires	Juliana Di Tullio	Front for Victory-PJ
Buenos Aires	María Azucena Ehcosor	Federal Unidos por una Nueva Argentina
Buenos Aires	Eduardo Alberto Fabiani	Juntos por Argentina
Buenos Aires	María Teresa García	Front for Victory-PJ
Buenos Aires	Juan Carlos Giordano	Izquierda Socialista-Frente de Izquierda
Buenos Aires	Rubén Darío Giustozzi	Juntos por Argentina
Buenos Aires	Dulce Granados	Front for Victory-PJ
Buenos Aires	Héctor María Gutiérrez	Radical Civic Union
Buenos Aires	Sandro Adrián Guzmán	Frente Norte
Buenos Aires	Carlos Miguel Kunkel	Front for Victory-PJ
Buenos Aires	Mónica Edith Litza	Federal Unidos por una Nueva Argentina
Buenos Aires	Soledad Martínez	Unión PRO
Buenos Aires	Sergio Tomás Massa	Federal Unidos por una Nueva Argentina
Buenos Aires	Carlos Julio Moreno	Front for Victory-PJ
Buenos Aires	Francisco Omar Plaini	Cultura, Educación y Trabajo
Buenos Aires	Héctor Pedro Recalde	Front for Victory-PJ
Buenos Aires	Oscar Alberto Romero	Justicialist
Buenos Aires	Claudia Mónica Rucci	Unidos por una Nueva Argentina
Buenos Aires	María Liliana Schwindt	Federal Unidos por una Nueva Argentina
Buenos Aires	Felipe Carlos Solá	Federal Unidos por una Nueva Argentina
Buenos Aires	Margarita Rosa Stolbizer	Generation for a National Encounter
Buenos Aires	Gabriela Alejandra Troiano	Socialist Party
Buenos Aires	Mirta Tundis	Federal Unidos por una Nueva Argentina
City of Buenos Aires	Alcira Susana Argumedo	Proyecto Sur
City of Buenos Aires	Alicia Irma Besada	Unión PRO
City of Buenos Aires	Juan Cabandié	Front for Victory-PJ
City of Buenos Aires	Elisa María Avelina Carrió	Civic Coalition
City of Buenos Aires	Ana Carla Carrizo	Radical Civic Union
City of Buenos Aires	Eduardo Raúl Conesa	Unión PRO
City of Buenos Aires	Carlos Salomón Heller	Solidario Sí
City of Buenos Aires	María Paula Lopardo	Unión PRO
City of Buenos Aires	Liliana Amalia Mazure	Front for Victory-PJ
City of Buenos Aires	José Luis Patiño	Unión PRO
City of Buenos Aires	Julio Raffo	Diálogo y Trabajo
City of Buenos Aires	Fernando Sánchez	Civic Coalition
City of Buenos Aires	Marcelo Adolfo Sorgente	Unión PRO
Catamarca	Eduardo Segundo Brizuela del Moral	Civic and Social Front of Catamarca
Catamarca	Myrian del Valle Juárez	Civic and Social Front of Catamarca
Catamarca	Néstor Nicolás Tomassi	Justicialist
Chaco	Gustavo José Martínez Campos	Justicialist
Chaco	Sandra Marcela Mendoza	Front for Victory-PJ
Chaco	Juan Manuel Pedrini	Front for Victory-PJ
Chaco	Alicia Terada	Civic Coalition
Chubut	Sixto Osvaldo Bermejo	Trabajo y Dignidad
Chubut	Elia Nelly Lagoria	Trabajo y Dignidad
Córdoba	Brenda Lis Austin	Radical Civic Union
Córdoba	Héctor Baldassi	Unión PRO
Córdoba	Ramón Ernesto Bernabey	Brigadier General Juan Bautista Bustos
Córdoba	María Eugenia Brezzo	Unidos por una Nueva Argentina
Córdoba	Agustín Santiago Calleri	Unidos por una Nueva Argentina
Córdoba	María Soledad Carrizo	Radical Civic Union
Córdoba	Andrés Ernesto Guzmán	Peronismo para la Victoria
Córdoba	Diego Matías Mestre	Radical Civic Union
Córdoba	Blanca Araceli Rossi	Unidos por una Nueva Argentina
Corrientes	Carlos Gustavo Rubín	Justicialist
Corrientes	María de las Mercedes Semhan	Radical Civic Union
Corrientes	Gustavo Adolfo Valdés	Radical Civic Union
Entre Ríos	Jorge Rubén Barreto	Front for Victory-PJ
Entre Ríos	María Cristina Cremer de Busti	Unión por Entre Ríos
Entre Ríos	Jorge Marcelo D'Agostino	Radical Civic Union
Entre Ríos	Ana Carolina Gaillard	Front for Victory-PJ
Entre Ríos	Lautaro Gervasoni	Front for Victory-PJ
Formosa	Juan Carlos Díaz Roig	Front for Victory-PJ
Formosa	Lucila Beatriz Dure	Socialist Party
Jujuy	Gabriela Romina Albornoz	Radical Civic Union
Jujuy	María Gabriela Burgos	Radical Civic Union
Jujuy	Héctor Olindo Tentor	Justicialist
La Pampa	Gustavo Rodolfo Fernández Mendia	Justicialist
La Pampa	Martín Maquieyra	Unión PRO
La Pampa	Francisco Javier Torroba	Radical Civic Union
La Rioja	Teresita Madera	Justicialist
La Rioja	María Clara del Valle Vega	Radical Civic Union
Mendoza	Alejandro Abraham	Front for Victory-PJ
Mendoza	Graciela Cousinet	Freemen of the South
Mendoza	Patricia Viviana Giménez	Radical Civic Union
Mendoza	Luis Alfonso Petri	Radical Civic Union
Mendoza	Soledad Sosa	Workers' Left Front
Misiones	Luis Mario Pastori	Radical Civic Union
Misiones	Silvia Lucrecia Risko	Frente Renovador de la Concordia
Misiones	Alex Roberto Ziegler	Libertad, Valores y Cambio
Neuquén	Norman Darío Martínez	Front for Victory-PJ
Neuquén	Adrián San Martín	Neuquén People's Movement
Neuquén	María Ines Villar Molina	Neuquén People's Movement
Río Negro	Luis María Bardeggia	Front for Victory-PJ
Río Negro	María Emilia Soria	Front for Victory-PJ
Salta	Guillermo Mario Durand Cornejo	Unión PRO
Salta	Evita Nélida Isa	Justicialist
Salta	Pablo Sebastián López	Workers' Left Front
San Juan	Eduardo Augusto Cáceres	Unión PRO
San Juan	Sandra Daniela Castro	Front for Victory-PJ
San Juan	Ramón Alberto Tovares	Front for Victory-PJ
San Luis	Berta Hortensia Arenas	Federal Commitment
San Luis	Luis Bernardo Lusquiños	Federal Commitment
San Luis	José Luis Riccardo	Radical Civic Union
Santa Cruz	Eduardo Raúl Costa	Radical Civic Union
Santa Cruz	Mauricio Ricardo Gómez Bull	Front for Victory-PJ
Santa Cruz	Susana María Toledo	Radical Civic Union
Santa Fe	Mario Domingo Barletta	Radical Civic Union
Santa Fe	Hermes Juan Binner	Socialist Party
Santa Fe	Alicia Mabel Ciciliani	Socialist Party
Santa Fe	Ana Isabel Copes	Democratic Progressive Party
Santa Fe	Josefina Victoria González	Front for Victory-PJ
Santa Fe	Luciano Andrés Laspina	Unión PRO
Santa Fe	Gisela Scaglia	Unión PRO
Santa Fe	Eduardo Jorge Seminara	Front for Victory-PJ
Santa Fe	Ricardo Adrián Spinozzi	Unión PRO
Santiago del Estero	Norma Amanda Abdala de Matarazzo	Civic Front for Santiago
Santiago del Estero	Manuel Humberto Juárez	Civic Front for Santiago
Santiago del Estero	Cristian Rodolfo Oliva	Civic Front for Santiago
Tierra del Fuego	Oscar Anselmo Martínez	Movimiento Solidario Popular
Tierra del Fuego	Martín Alejandro Pérez	Front for Victory-PJ
Tucumán	Nilda Mabel Carrizo	Front for Victory-PJ
Tucumán	Juan Francisco Casañas	Del Bicentenario
Tucumán	Miriam Graciela Gallardo	Front for Victory-PJ
Tucumán	Federico Augusto Masso	Freemen of the South

=== Senate ===
The 72 members of the Senate are elected in the same 24 constituencies, with three seats in each. The party receiving the most votes in each constituency wins two seats, with the third seat awarded to the second-placed party. The 2017 elections will see one-third of Senators renewed, with eight provinces electing three Senators; Buenos Aires, Formosa, Jujuy, La Rioja, Misiones, San Juan, San Luis and Santa Cruz.

Outgoing Senators
Province	Senator	Party
Buenos Aires	Juan Manuel Abal Medina	PJ-Front for Victory
Buenos Aires	María Laura Leguizamón	PJ-Front for Victory
Buenos Aires	Jaime Linares	Generation for a National Encounter
Formosa	María Graciela de la Rosa	PJ-Front for Victory
Formosa	José Miguel Ángel Mayans	PJ-Front for Victory
Formosa	Luis Carlos Petcoff Naidenoff	Radical Civic Union
Jujuy	Walter Basilio Barrionuevo	PJ-Front for Victory
Jujuy	Liliana Beatriz Fellner	PJ-Front for Victory
Jujuy	Silvia del Rosario Giacoppo	Radical Civic Union
La Rioja	Hilda Clelia Aguirre	PJ-Front for Victory
La Rioja	Mirtha María Teresita Luna	PJ-Front for Victory
La Rioja	Carlos Saúl Menem	Federalismo y Liberación
Misiones	Salvador Cabral	PJ-Front for Victory
Misiones	Sandra Daniela Giménez	Misiones
Misiones	Juan Manuel Irrazábal	PJ-Front for Victory
San Juan	Roberto Gustavo Basualdo	Production and Labour
San Juan	Ruperto Eduardo Godoy	PJ-Front for Victory
San Juan	Marina Raquel Riofrío	PJ-Front for Victory
San Luis	Liliana Teresita Negre de Alonso	Justicialista San Luis
San Luis	Daniel Raúl Pérsico	PJ-Front for Victory
San Luis	Adolfo Rodríguez Saá	Justicialista San Luis
Santa Cruz	Virginia María García	PJ-Front for Victory
Santa Cruz	María Ester Labado	PJ-Front for Victory
Santa Cruz	Alfredo Anselmo Martínez	Radical Civic Union

== Schedule ==
The timetable for the different national electoral acts was established on the following dates:

- 25 April: Closure of the provisional electoral register.
- 5 May: Publication of the provisional electoral register.
- 20 May: Deadline to correct the electoral register.
- 14 June: Deadline to register the alliances.
- 24 June: Deadline to register the pre-nominations for the primary elections (PASO).
- 14 July: Beginning of the electoral campaign for the PASO and publication of the definitive electoral register.
- 21 July: Beginning of the prohibition of the broadcast of advertisements to capture the vote.
- 29 July: Beginning of the prohibition of public acts (inaugurations, announcements) by the government until the PASO.
- 11 August: Beginning of the election silence.
- 13 August: Primary elections (PASO).
- 17 September: Start of the election campaign for the national elections.
- 27 September: Beginning of the prohibition to broadcast advertising to capture the vote.
- 7 October: Beginning of the prohibition of public acts (inaugurations, announcements) by the government, until the elections.
- 14 October: Beginning of the prohibition to publish opinion polls.
- 20 October: Beginning of the election silence.
- 22 October: National legislative elections.

== Results ==
=== Chamber of Deputies ===
Party or alliance		Votes	%	Seats
Party or alliance		Votes	%	Won
Cambiemos		10,261,407	41.75	61
Citizen's Unity–Front for Victory	Citizen's Unity	4,083,694	16.61	17
Citizen's Unity–Front for Victory	Front for Victory	518,353	2.11	3
Citizen's Unity–Front for Victory	Justicialist Front (Santa Fe)	509,190	2.07	3
Citizen's Unity–Front for Victory	Civic Front for Santiago	384,125	1.56	3
Citizen's Unity–Front for Victory	Front for the Renewal of Concord	268,646	1.09	2
Citizen's Unity–Front for Victory	Citizen's Front for Victory	235,699	0.96	2
Citizen's Unity–Front for Victory	Together We Can More	146,730	0.60	1
Citizen's Unity–Front for Victory	Citizen and Social Front	27,825	0.11	1
Citizen's Unity–Front for Victory	Popular Front for Liberation	16,906	0.07	0
Citizen's Unity–Front for Victory	Riojan Popular Alternative	4,423	0.02	0
Citizen's Unity–Front for Victory	Total	6,195,591	25.21	32
Justicialist Front	Justicialist Front	1,414,236	5.75	7
Justicialist Front	Union for Córdoba	626,887	2.55	3
Justicialist Front	We Are Mendoza	272,552	1.11	1
Justicialist Front	Chaco Deserves More	257,053	1.05	2
Justicialist Front	Everybody Front	226,425	0.92	2
Justicialist Front	Unity and Renovation Front	170,759	0.69	1
Justicialist Front	Justicialist Unity Front	158,573	0.65	2
Justicialist Front	Justicialist Party	96,121	0.39	2
Justicialist Front	Justicialist Front for Victory	95,927	0.39	2
Justicialist Front	Land of Union Front	21,595	0.09	0
Justicialist Front	Total	3,340,128	13.59	22
1País	1País	1,142,744	4.65	4
1País	Renewal Front–1País	175,954	0.72	0
1País	1 Santa Fe Project	87,955	0.36	0
1País	Popular Union	26,224	0.11	0
1País	A New Country	18,615	0.08	0
1País	One Rioja	9,176	0.04	0
1País	Authentic Renewal Front	6,890	0.03	0
1País	Total	1,467,558	5.97	4
Workers' Left Front	Workers' Left Front	1,067,522	4.34	2
Workers' Left Front	Workers' Party	68,521	0.28	0
Workers' Left Front	Socialist Left	10,332	0.04	0
Workers' Left Front	Socialist Workers' Party	9,785	0.04	0
Workers' Left Front	Total	1,156,160	4.70	2
Socialist Party	Progressive, Civic and Social Front	287,613	1.17	1
Socialist Party	Neuquino Front	68,210	0.28	0
Socialist Party	Socialist Party	42,248	0.17	0
Socialist Party	Let's Advance Front	11,710	0.05	0
Socialist Party	Popular Progressive Front	10,763	0.04	0
Socialist Party	La Pampa Progressive Front	7,229	0.03	0
Socialist Party	Total	427,773	1.74	1
Evolución		237,132	0.96	2
Intransigent Party		184,610	0.75	1
Republican Force		155,089	0.63	0
MST–MAS	Left in Front for Socialism	61,716	0.25	0
MST–MAS	New Left	57,553	0.23	0
MST–MAS	Workers' Socialist Movement	26,943	0.11	0
MST–MAS	Total	146,212	0.59	0
Chubut for Everybody Front		101,613	0.41	1
Self-determination and Freedom		82,977	0.34	0
Neuquén People's Movement		81,077	0.33	1
Agrarian and Social Party		80,004	0.33	0
Unite por la Libertad y la Dignidad		75,499	0.31	0
Encuentro Vecinal Córdoba		72,533	0.30	0
Popular Party		71,471	0.29	0
Future City		71,278	0.29	0
We are all Salta		67,539	0.27	0
Popular Unity		64,817	0.26	0
People First Party		50,645	0.21	0
Civic Coalition ARI		42,937	0.17	0
Broad Space		32,458	0.13	0
We are Corrientes		23,790	0.10	0
Freemen of the South Movement		12,678	0.05	0
Action for a New Democracy		12,660	0.05	0
Authentic Socialist Party		12,084	0.05	0
Proyecto Sur		11,754	0.05	0
New October Party		11,620	0.05	0
New Leadership		7,263	0.03	0
Fueguino Federal Party		5,784	0.02	0
Labor and People's Party		5,423	0.02	0
Humanist Party		3,895	0.02	0
Initiative for the Union		3,334	0.01	0
Latin American Integration Movement of Social Expression		2,147	0.01	0
Principles and Conviction Party		1,174	0.00	0
Total		24,580,114	100.00	127
Valid votes		24,580,114	95.64	
Invalid votes		357,480	1.39	
Blank votes		762,151	2.97	
Total votes		25,699,745	100.00	
Registered voters/turnout		33,454,411	76.82	
Source: Padron, DINE

==== Results by province ====
Province	Let's Change			Citizen's Unity			Justicialist Front			1Country			Others		
Province	Votes	%	Seats	Votes	%	Seats	Votes	%	Seats	Votes	%	Seats	Votes	%	Seats
Buenos Aires	3,930,406	42.15	15	3,383,114	36.28	13	485,138	5.20	1	1,028,385	11.03	4	497,665	5.34	2
Buenos Aires City	982,867	50.98	8	419,176	21.74	3	—	—	—	93,980	4.87	—	431,805	22.40	2
Catamarca	83,937	41.86	1	11,935	5.95	—	95,927	47.84	2	—	—	—	8,715	4.35	—
Chaco	271,110	41.79	2	69,786	10.76	—	257,053	39.62	2	18,615	2.87	—	32,220	4.97	—
Chubut	95,266	31.16	1	73,026	23.88	—	—	—	—	—	—	—	137,463	44.96	1
Córdoba	996,950	48.48	5	199,683	9.71	1	626,887	30.48	3	—	—	—	232,875	11.32	—
Corrientes	317,900	55.43	2	146,730	25.58	1	—	—	—	85,135	14.84	—	23,790	4.15	—
Entre Ríos	437,962	53.02	3	—	—	—	313,605	37.97	2	—	—	—	74,466	9.01	—
Formosa	119,865	36.58	1	202,817	61.89	1	—	—	—	—	—	—	5,005	1.53	—
Jujuy	185,253	51.73	2	—	—	—	70,818	19.78	1	33,859	9.46	—	68,171	19.04	—
La Pampa	96,045	45.39	1	—	—	—	96,121	45.42	2	—	—	—	19,444	9.19	—
La Rioja	85,685	44.78	1	4,423	2.31	—	84,477	44.15	1	9,176	4.80	—	7,597	3.97	—
Mendoza	491,012	45.73	3	—	—	—	272,552	25.38	1	—	—	—	310,126	28.88	1
Misiones	211,164	33.61	1	268,646	42.76	2	—	—	—	26,224	4.17	—	122,241	19.46	—
Neuquén	106,821	28.21	1	73,310	19.36	1	—	—	—	6,879	1.82	—	191,685	50.62	1
Río Negro	122,838	31.99	1	189,557	49.36	1	—	—	—	—	—	—	71,619	18.65	—
Salta	211,377	30.25	1	179,295	25.66	1	170,759	24.44	1	—	—	—	137,387	19.66	—
San Juan	132,820	31.49	1	—	—	—	226,425	53.68	2	20,379	4.83	—	42,200	10.00	—
San Luis	123,994	43.01	1	—	—	—	158,573	55.00	2	—	—	—	5,722	1.98	—
Santa Cruz	72,759	43.91	2	52,953	31.96	1	—	—	—	6,890	4.16	—	33,105	19.98	—
Santa Fe	743,139	37.80	5	509,190	25.90	3	—	—	—	87,955	4.47	—	625,781	31.83	1
Santiago del Estero	94,968	17.33	—	384,125	70.09	3	—	—	—	50,081	9.14	—	18,842	3.44	—
Tierra del Fuego	27,654	29.77	1	27,825	29.96	1	21,595	23.25	—	—	—	—	15,813	17.02	—
Tucumán	319,615	32.56	2	—	—	—	460,198	46.89	2	—	—	—	201,693	20.55	—
Total	10,261,407	41.75	61	6,195,591	25.21	32	3,340,128	13.59	22	1,467,558	5.97	4	3,315,430	13.49	8

=== Senate ===
Party or alliance		Votes	%	Seats
Party or alliance		Votes	%	Won
Cambienos		4,864,886	41.01	12
Citizen's Unity–Front for Victory	Citizen's Unity	3,529,900	29.76	1
Citizen's Unity–Front for Victory	Front for the Renewal of Concord	271,051	2.29	2
Citizen's Unity–Front for Victory	Front for Victory	255,618	2.15	3
Citizen's Unity–Front for Victory	Riojan Popular Alternative	4,741	0.04	0
Citizen's Unity–Front for Victory	Total	4,061,310	34.24	6
1País	1País	1,089,193	9.18	0
1País	Renewal Front–1Country	33,997	0.29	0
1País	Popular Union	24,435	0.21	0
1País	Authentic Renewal Front	7,032	0.06	0
1País	Total	1,154,657	9.73	0
Justicialist Front	Justicialist Front	662,525	5.59	2
Justicialist Front	Everybody Front	227,503	1.92	2
Justicialist Front	Justicialist Unity Front	168,167	1.42	2
Justicialist Front	Total	1,058,195	8.92	6
Workers' Left Front	Workers' Left Front	525,416	4.43	0
Workers' Left Front	Workers' Party	14,339	0.12	0
Workers' Left Front	Socialist Workers' Party	4,796	0.04	0
Workers' Left Front	Total	544,551	4.59	0
Agrarian and Social Party		84,310	0.71	0
Socialist Party	Let's Advance Front	11,712	0.10	0
Socialist Party	Popular Progressive Front	11,053	0.09	0
Socialist Party	Total	22,765	0.19	0
MST–MAS	New Left	11,451	0.10	0
MST–MAS	Left in Front for Socialism	8,420	0.07	0
MST–MAS	Workers' Socialist Movement	2,690	0.02	0
MST–MAS	Total	22,561	0.19	0
Action for a New Democracy		12,860	0.11	0
Proyecto Sur		12,620	0.11	0
New October Party		12,406	0.10	0
Popular Unity		8,614	0.07	0
Latin American Integration Movement of Social Expression		2,185	0.02	0
Total		11,861,920	100.00	24
Valid votes		11,861,920	95.96	
Invalid votes		108,361	0.88	
Blank votes		390,937	3.16	
Total votes		12,361,218	100.00	
Registered voters/turnout		15,701,694	78.73	
Source: Padron, DINE

==== Results by province ====
Province	Let's Change			Citizen's Unity			1Country			Justicialist Front			Others		
Province	Votes	%	Seats	Votes	%	Seats	Votes	%	Seats	Votes	%	Seats	Votes	%	Seats
Buenos Aires	3,912,526	41.35	2	3,529,900	37.31	1	1,069,747	11.31	—	500,945	5.29	—	448,933	4.74	—
Formosa	121,520	37.12	1	201,972	61.69	2	—	—	—	—	—	—	3,899	1.19	—
Jujuy	189,858	52.60	2	—	—	—	33,997	9.42	—	75,062	20.80	1	62,039	17.19	—
La Rioja	91,307	48.02	2	4,741	2.49	—	—	—	—	86,518	45.50	1	7,565	3.98	—
Misiones	210,956	33.28	1	271,051	42.76	2	24,435	3.85	—	—	—	—	127,482	20.11	—
San Juan	134,742	32.31	1	—	—	—	19,446	4.66	—	227,503	54.55	2	35,364	8.48	—
San Luis	130,165	42.94	1	—	—	—	—	—	—	168,167	55.48	2	4,796	1.58	—
Santa Cruz	73,812	44.12	2	53,646	32.07	1	7,032	4.20	—	—	—	—	32,794	19.60	—
Total	4,864,886	41.01	12	4,061,310	34.24	6	1,154,657	9.73	0	1,058,195	8.92	6	722,872	6.09	0
