= Chamber of Deputies of San Juan =

Legislative body of San Juan Province, Argentina

Type
- Type: Unicameral

Leadership
- President (Vice Governor): Roberto Gattoni (PJ) since 10 December 2019
- First Vice President: Eduardo Cabello (PJ) since 10 December 2019
- Second Vice President: Carlos Antonio Platero (PyT) since 10 December 2019

Structure
- Seats: 36 legislators
- Political groups: Government (25): Justicialist (20); Bloquista (3); ConFe (1); Broad Front UC; Opposition (11): Production and Labour (6); Este (2); PRO JXC (1); ACTUAR (1); San Juan First (1)
- Length of term: 4 years
- Authority: Constitution of San Juan

Elections
- Voting system: Parallel voting
- Last election: 2 June 2019
- Next election: 2023

Meeting place
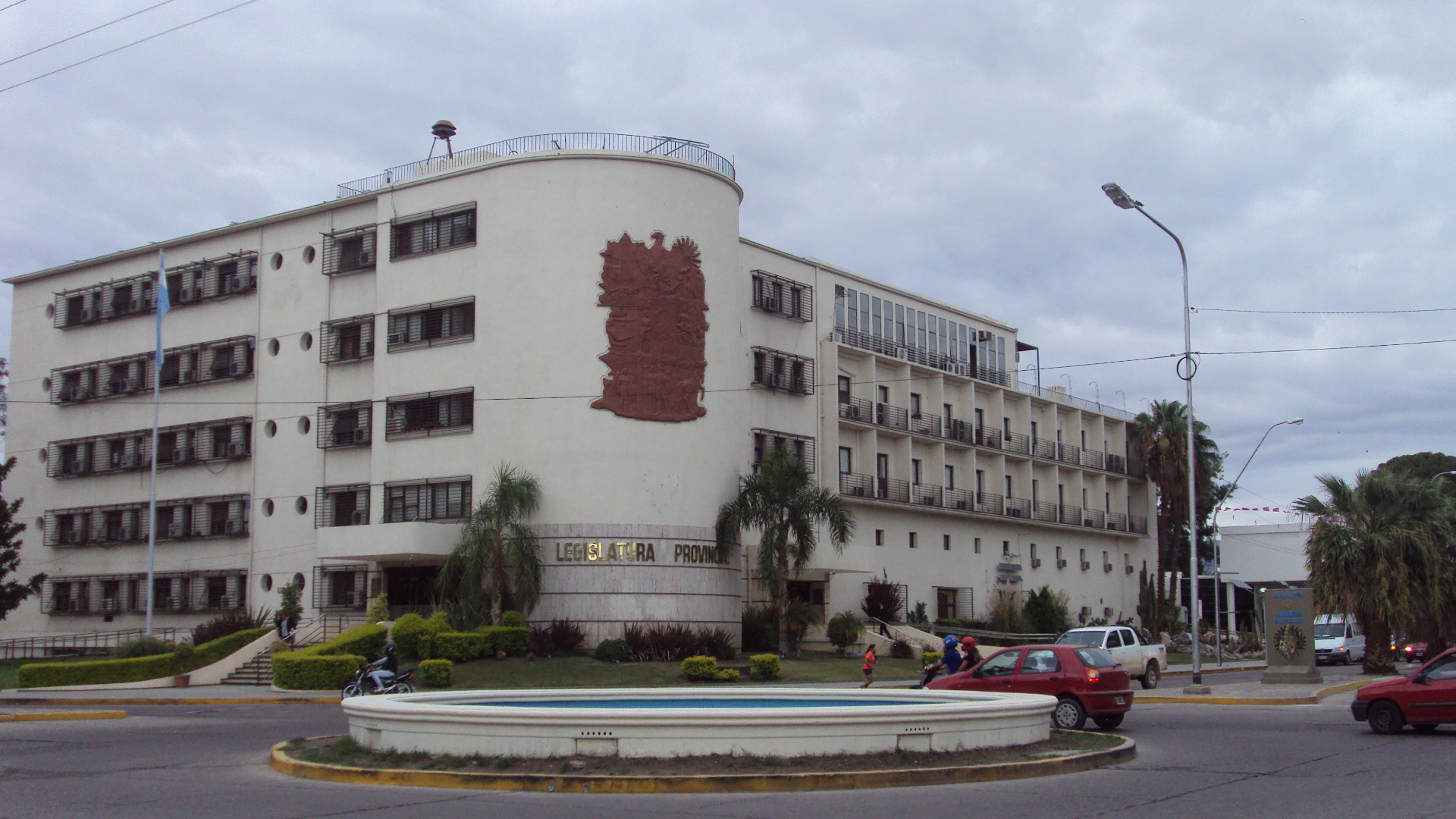
- Legislatura de la Provincia de San Juan, San Juan, San Juan Province

Website
- diputadossanjuan.gob.ar

The Chamber of Deputies of San Juan Province (Spanish: Cámara de Diputados de la Provincia de San Juan) is the unicameral legislative body of San Juan Province, Argentina. Convening in the provincial capital city of San Juan, the chamber consists of 36 legislators who serve four-year terms, with the entire membership renewed every election cycle. Its unique electoral system blends local and proportional representation, choosing 19 deputies directly from single-member districts representing the province's 19 departments, and 17 deputies through a province-wide proportional system. The legislature is presided over by the Vice Governor of San Juan.

Established on January 21, 1821, the legislature operates under powers defined by the provincial constitution and has been headquartered since 1984 in a converted 1950s hotel building. Following a shift in political alignment for the 2023–2027 legislative period, Martín serves as the chamber's president, with the Justicialist Party holding the majority as the opposition, unlike the previous term, when they were on the government side.

== Description ==
It comprises 36 legislators, 19 of whom are directly elected in single-member districts corresponding to the 19 departments of San Juan, and 17 of whom are elected in a single province-wide multi-member district through proportional representation.

The Chamber of Deputies convened for the first time on 21 January 1821. Its powers and responsibilities are established in the provincial constitution. Elections to the chamber take place every four years, when the entirety of its members are renewed. The legislature is presided by the Vice Governor of San Juan, who is elected alongside the governor every four years.The Chamber convenes in the provincial capital, the City of San Juan. The current legislative building was originally built in the 1950s as a hotel. It became the official seat of the legislature in 1984.

== Member of the chamber ==
Since 2019, the president of the Chamber of Deputies has been Roberto Guillermo Gattoni, of the Justicialist Party. Gattoni was elected in the gubernatorial ticket of Sergio Uñac. The Justicialist Party has a majority in the chamber since the 2019 elections, while the largest opposition bloc is Production and Labour. For 2023-2027, the president was replaced by Fabián Martín as Vice governor of San Juan. It has 36 member deputies.
