= National Institute for Indigenous Affairs =

Argentina government agency

- Instituto Nacional de Asuntos Indígenas
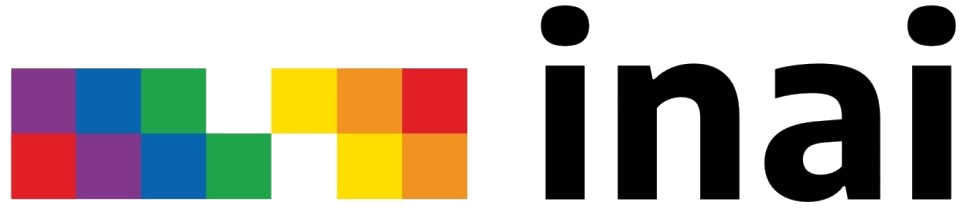

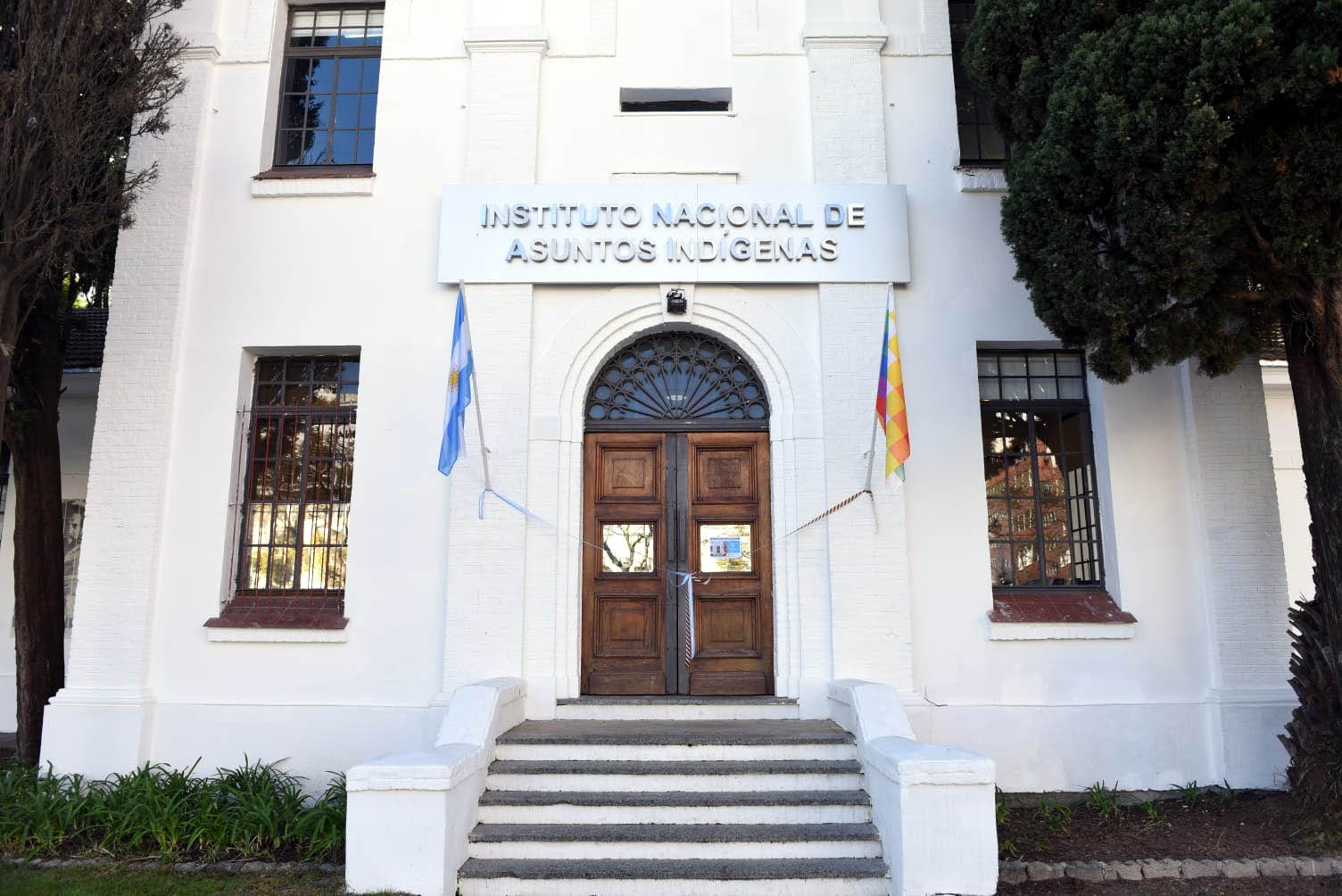
- INAI headquarters in Buenos Aires

Agency overview
- Formed: 1985; 41 years ago
- Jurisdiction: Government of Argentina
- Headquarters: Espacio de la Memoria y Derechos Humanos; Av. del Libertador 8151; Buenos Aires
- Annual budget: ARS 1,324 million (2023)
- Agency executive: Claudio Avruj, Director
- Parent department: Chief of the Cabinet of Ministers
- Website: argentina.gob.ar/inai

The National Institute for Indigenous Affairs (Spanish: Instituto Nacional de Asuntos Indígenas; mostly known for its acronym INAI) is a decentralised agency of the Government of Argentina responding to the Chief of the Cabinet of Ministers tasked with overseeing the government's policy on affairs pertaining to Argentina's various Indigenous communities.

It was established in 1985. Some of Argentina's largest Indigenous communities include the Guaraní, the Diaguita, the Qulla, the Mapuche, the Aonikénk, the Wichí, the Qom, among others. Overall, an estimated 3 million people belong to these communities.

== History ==
The INAI was established through Law 23.302 "On Indigenous policy and support for Aboriginal Communities", signed into law on 8 November 1985 on initiative of President Raúl Alfonsín. From its creation, it intended to be a decentralized organ with active participation from Indigenous communities. It originally answered to the Ministry of Health and Social Action.

In 2006, the INAI was reorganized under the Ministry of Social Development. It was reorganized again under the Secretariat of Human Rights of the Ministry of Justice and Human Rights in 2016.

== Function ==
The INAI is responsible for administrating the National Registry of Indigenous Communities (Renaci), which keeps track of Argentina's Indigenous communities and their legal rights to their ancestral lands. Toward the end of 2018, some 1,653 communities had been registered, of which 1,456 held legal ownership over various territories.

In addition, the INAI must carry out specific programmes oriented toward the development of idnigenous communities and policies to improve their quality of life. These include environmental and housing programmes, sustainable food production programmes, and various initiatives to safekeep and rescue endangered cultural elements such as language. In particular, the INAI is concerned with maintaining bilingual and inter-cultural education among Indigenous communities.

== Criticism and shortcomings ==
Indigenous communities have criticized the Argentine government for assigning insufficient funds in the national budget to the INAI. Over the years, the institute has lacked the necessary human and technological resources to fulfill its intended purposes. In addition, a 2002 report by the Center for Legal and Social Studies found there were very few actual Indigenous people employed by the INAI.

From 2016 to 2018, under President Mauricio Macri, 70 of the INAI's employees (over half of its overall work force) were fired.
