= Sandra Mendoza =

Argentine politician (1963–2026)

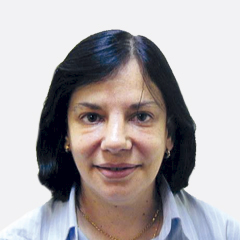
- Mendoza in 2017

National Deputy
- In office 10 December 2009 – 10 December 2017
- Constituency: Chaco

Personal details
- Born: Sandra Marcela Mendoza; 20 April 1963 Presidencia Roque Sáenz Peña, Chaco Province, Argentina
- Died: 11 February 2026 (aged 62) Buenos Aires, Argentina
- Party: PJ
- Education: National University of the Northeast
- Occupation: Kinesiologist

Sandra Marcela Mendoza (20 April 1963 – 11 February 2026) was an Argentine politician. A member of the Justicialist Party, she served in the Chamber of Deputies from 2009 to 2017.

Mendoza died in Buenos Aires on 11 February 2026, at the age of 62.
