= Magdalena Solari Quintana =

Argentine politician

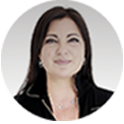

National Senator
- In office 10 December 2017 – 10 December 2023
- Constituency: Misiones

Personal details
- Born: 23 January 1968 (age 58) Buenos Aires, Argentina
- Party: Party of Social Concord
- Education: Catholic University of Santa Fe

Magdalena Solari Quintana (born 23 January 1968) is an Argentine politician who served as a National Senator for Misiones Province from 2017 to 2023. She previously served as a member of the Posadas City Council. She is a member of the Party of Social Concord.

Solari Quintana was born in Buenos Aires. She studied law at the Catholic University of Santa Fe, graduating in 2001. She was a member of the Posadas City Council until her election to the Senate, and was twice elected to preside the body, from 2013 to 2015.

Solari Quintana was the second Front for the Renewal of Concord (FRC) candidate to the National Senate in Misiones for the 2017 legislative election, behind Maurice Closs. The FRC was the most voted list in the province, and Solari Quintana was elected. She was sworn in on 29 November 2017. In the Senate, she is part of the parliamentary commissions on Women's Affairs, Education and Culture, Justice and Criminal Affairs, General Legislation, Tourism and Accords.

As of 2021, she presided the single-member FRC bloc in the Senate, as Closs joined the Frente de Todos bloc in 2019.
