= Magdalena Odarda =

Argentinian lawyer and politician

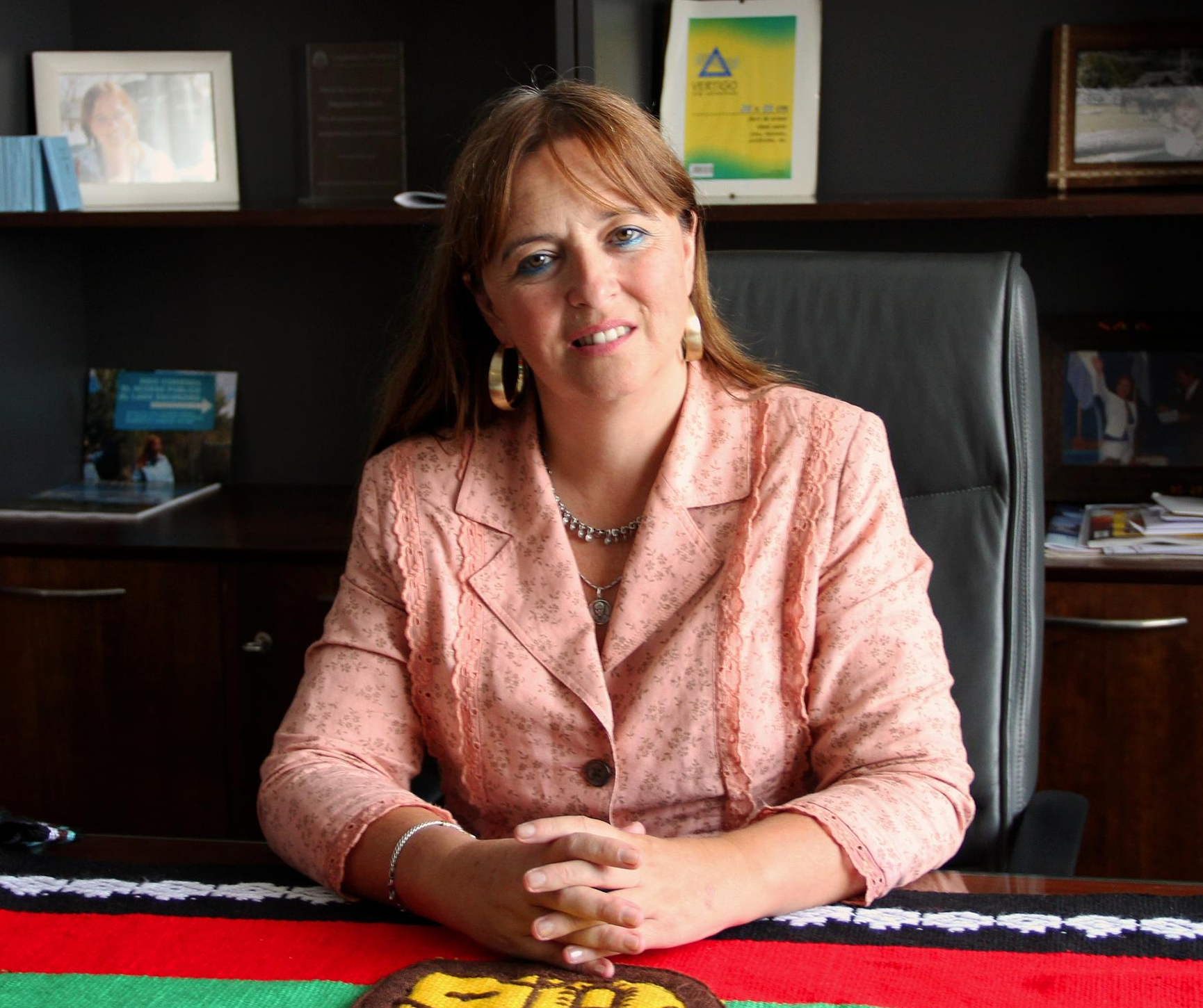

President of the National Institute for Indigenous Affairs
- In office 10 December 2019 – 10 December 2023
- President: Alberto Fernández
- Preceded by: Jimena Psathakis
- Succeeded by: Vacant

National Senator
- In office 10 December 2013 – 10 December 2019
- Constituency: Río Negro

Provincial Legislator of Río Negro
- In office 10 December 2003 – 10 December 2013
- Constituency: Provincial list

Personal details
- Born: María Magdalena Odarda; 8 December 1965 (age 59); Córdoba, Argentina
- Political party: Civic Coalition ARI (until 2017); Partido RIO (2017–present)
- Education: National University of Córdoba
- Occupation: Lawyer, politician

María Magdalena Odarda (born 8 December 1965) is an Argentine lawyer and politician. From 2019 to 2023, she served as president of the National Institute for Indigenous Affairs, under the Ministry of Justice and Human Rights.

She was previously a member of the Argentine Senate from 2013 to 2019, and a provincial legislator in Río Negro from 2003 to 2013.

== Early life ==
Magdalena Odarda was born in Córdoba on 8 December 1965. After graduating from the National University of Córdoba, she moved to the town of Sierra Grande in Río Negro Province. There she worked as a teacher and advised various unions.

== Political career ==
In 1999, she became a councilor in Sierra Grande. In 2000, she was a legislative advisor, and in 2003, she became a provincial legislator representing the Civic Coalition ARI (CC-ARI). She was president of the party in Río Negro Province until 2015. In 2011, she was a CC-ARI candidate for governor of Río Negro, but obtained only 5.34% of the votes, losing to Carlos Soria from the Front for Victory.

In 2013, after going through the simultaneous and compulsory open primaries and obtaining 18% of the votes, Odarda won a seat in the Argentine Senate, representing the minority of Río Negro for the Progressive Front Alliance with 26.28% of the votes. The election was won by the Front for Victory, headed by Miguel Pichetto who obtained 49.95%.

In 2015, she was a candidate for governor for the Progressive Front for Equality and the Republic, competing against Miguel Ángel Pichetto and Alberto Weretilneck. She finished third with 10% of the votes.

As president of the Río Negro CC-ARI, Odarda, similar to Pablo Javkin, president of the party in Santa Fe, decided to remain independent from the party's national order and not conform to Cambiemos. In November 2017, the authorities and parliamentarians of the Rio Negro Civic Coalition decided to leave the CC-ARI and form their own provincial party, called RIO.

In December 2017, the weekly Parlamentario ranked Odarda 9th among senators on its list of "most industrious national legislators".

In December 2019, President Alberto Fernández appointed Magdalena Odarda head of the National Institute for Indigenous Affairs.
