= María de los Ángeles Sacnun =

Argentine politician

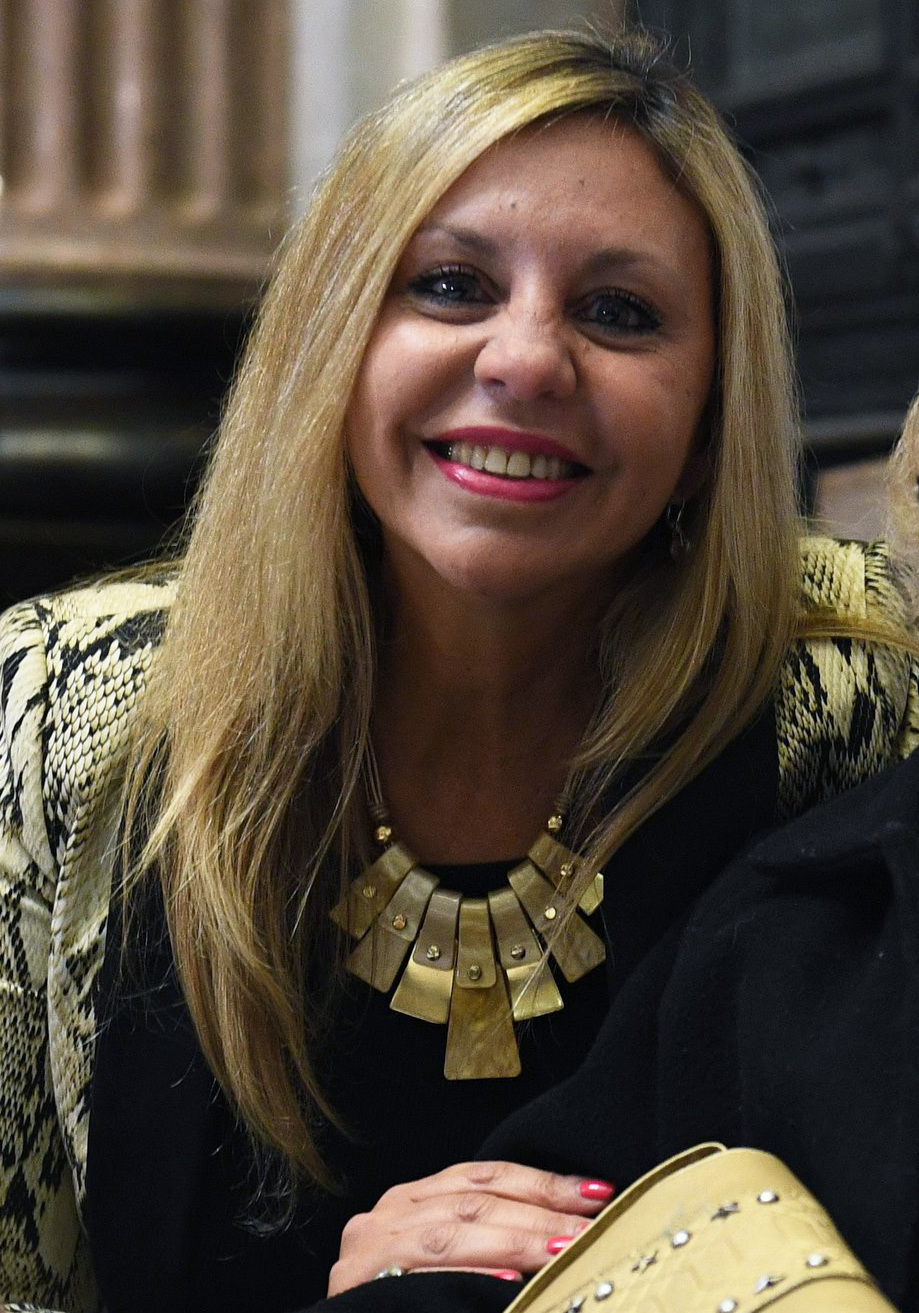

National Senator
- In office 10 December 2015 – 10 December 2021
- Constituency: Santa Fe

Personal details
- Born: 17 August 1970 (age 56) Firmat, Argentina
- Party: Justicialist Party
- Other political affiliations: Front for Victory (2015–2017); Citizen's Unity (2017–2019); Frente de Todos (2019–2023)
- Education: National University of Rosario

María de los Ángeles Sacnun (born 17 August 1970) is an Argentine politician who was a National Senator for Santa Fe Province from 2015 to 2021. A member of the Justicialist Party, she was part of the Front for Victory and Frente de Todos parliamentary blocs.

== Early life and education ==
Sacnun was born on 17 August 1970 in Firmat, a city in south Santa Fe Province. She studied law at the National University of Rosario, graduating in 1995. In addition, she is a mediator certified by the Colegio de Abogados de Rosario. She has one child.

== Political career ==
Sacnun became politically active in her youth, participating in student organizations in high school and university. She was elected to the city council of her hometown, Firmat, as a member of the Justicialist Party. She would eventually lead the Firmat chapter of the party's press secretariat, and served as a member of the provincial congress and the national congress of the Justicialist Party. She co-founded Red Solidaria Firmat, a civil association focused on social assistance and charity work.

=== National Senator ===
In the 2015 general election, she ran for one of Santa Fe's three seats in the Argentine Senate as the second candidate in the Front for Victory list, behind Omar Perotti. Perotti and Sacnun's list was the most voted in the province, with 32% of the vote, granting both Perotti and Sacnun the seats for the majority as per the Senate's limited voting system. She formed part of the Front for Victory bloc, remaining in it even after most of its members broke away and formed the Argentina Federal bloc following the 2017 legislative election.

As a senator, Sacnun formed part of the parliamentary commissions on General Legislation, Justice and Criminal Affairs, Regional Economies and Small Businesses, and Women's Affairs, and presided the commission on Constitutional Affairs. She was a supporter of the legalisation of abortion in Argentina, voting in favour of the two Voluntary Interruption of Pregnancy bills debated by the Argentine Congress in 2018 and 2020. Upon the Senate's approval of the bill in 2020, Sacnun stated that the legalisation of abortion was an "important step" that would have a major impact in the region.

She ran for re-election in the 2021 legislative election, this time as the second candidate in the Frente de Todos list, behind Marcelo Lewandowski. Lewandowski and Sacnun's list received 32.19%, losing by a wide margin to the Juntos por el Cambio list headed by Carolina Losada, which received 40.13% of the vote. As part of the second-most voted list, only Lewandowski was elected for the minority, and Sacnun lost her chance at re-election.
