= Cristina Fiore =

Argentine politician

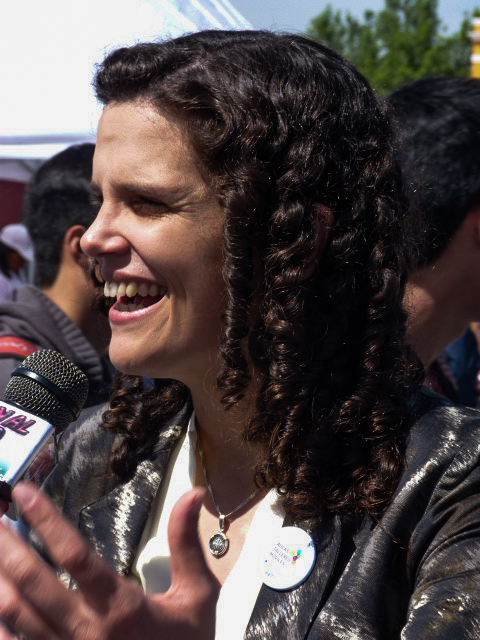

Provincial Deputy of Salta
- Incumbent
- Assumed office 10 December 2019
- Constituency: Capital Department
- In office 10 December 1995 – 10 December 1999
- Constituency: Capital Department

National Senator
- In office 10 December 2013 – 10 December 2019
- Constituency: Salta

National Deputy
- In office 10 December 2011 – 10 December 2013
- Constituency: Salta

Personal details
- Born: María Cristina del Valle Fiore Viñuales; 16 February 1974 (age 52) Salta, Argentina
- Party: Salta Renewal Party
- Other political affiliations: Front for Victory (2003–2015)
- Education: Catholic University of Salta

María Cristina del Valle Fiore Viñuales (born 16 February 1974), better known as Cristina Fiore, is an Argentine politician, currently serving as a member of the Chamber of Deputies of Salta Province. She previously served as a National Senator (2013–2019) and a National Deputy (2011–2013) for Salta. Fiore is the leader of the provincial Salta Renewal Party.

== Early life and education ==
Fiore Viñuales was born on 16 February 1974 in Salta. She finished high school at the Colegio de Jesús de Salta, a private Catholic school, and then went on to study law at the Catholic University of Salta (UCASAL). She completed her law degree in 2000.

== Political career ==
In 1995, aged 21, she was elected to the provincial Chamber of Deputies of Salta on the Salta Renewal Party list. In 2001, she was elected to the City Council of Salta, achieving re-election in 2005 and 2009. In 2010, she was appointed Secretary of Citizen Protection in the Salta municipal government by then-mayor Miguel Isa. In 2011, she ran for a seat in the National Chamber of Deputies on the Front for Victory (FPV) list as the second candidate, behind Pablo Kosiner. The FPV list received 56.51% of the vote, enough for Fiore to be elected.

Two years after being elected as deputy, Fiore was the second FPV candidate to the National Senate in Salta in the 2013 legislative election, behind Juan Manuel Urtubey. The FPV list was the most voted in the province, with 29.36% of the vote, and the FPV took the two seats for the majority. She originally formed part of the Front for Victory bloc, later joining most other Justicialist Party senators in breaking away and forming the Federal bloc, led by Juan Carlos Romero, following the 2017 legislative election.

In 2016, she was elected president of the Salta Renewal Party.

As senator, Fiore voted against of the Voluntary Interruption of Pregnancy bill, which would have legalised abortion in Argentina, but was struck down by the Senate on 8 August 2018. Fiore was one of the initiative's most vocal opponents, calling abortion "in all instances [...] a tragedy".

Following the end of her term as senator, Fiore ran for a second term in the provincial Chamber of Deputies of Salta as part of the Frente Olmedo Gobernador, which backed the unsuccessful gubernatorial candidacy of Alfredo Olmedo. She was the first candidate in the list in the Capital Department, which received 12.44% of the vote – enough for her to be elected.
