= Eduardo Raúl Costa =

Argentine politician and businessman

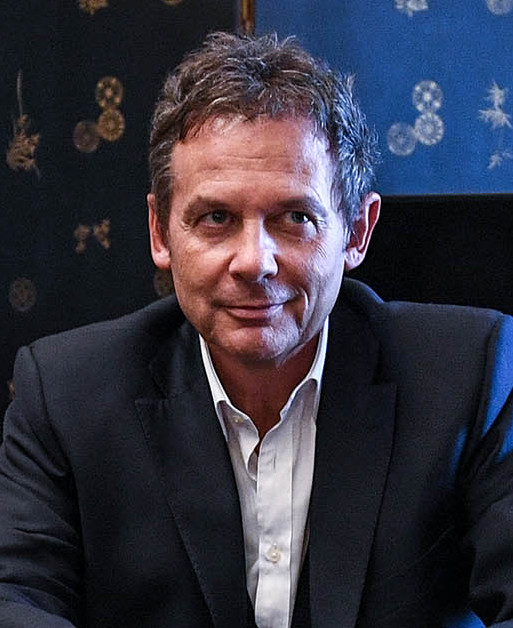
- Costa in the Argentine Senate (2018)

National Senator
- In office 10 December 2017 – 10 December 2023
- Constituency: Santa Cruz

National Deputy
- In office 10 December 2009 – 9 December 2017
- Constituency: Santa Cruz

Personal details
- Born: Eduardo Raúl Costa; 1961 (age 64–65) Río Gallegos, Santa Cruz, Argentina
- Party: Radical Civic Union
- Domestic partner: Mariana Zuvic (separated 2019)
- Children: 2
- Education: University of Belgrano
- Occupation: Politician; businessman; public accountant

Eduardo Raúl Costa (born 1961) is an Argentine politician and businessman. He served as a National Deputy for Santa Cruz from 2009 to 2017 and as a National Senator for the same province from 2017 to 2023. He is a member of the Radical Civic Union (UCR).

== Early life and education ==
Costa was born in Río Gallegos, Santa Cruz, in 1961. He studied at the University of Belgrano in Buenos Aires, qualifying as a public accountant and business administrator.

== Business career ==
Before entering elective politics, Costa developed retail and construction–supply businesses across Patagonia. He is widely associated with the home-improvement and building–materials chain Hipertehuelche, which expanded in the 1990s and 2000s.

== Political career ==
=== Early candidacies ===
Costa first ran for governor of Santa Cruz in 2007 as the candidate of a UCR–Civic Coalition alliance; he was defeated by Daniel Peralta. He ran again in 2011, when Peralta was re-elected; official provincial tallies list Costa as the main opposition contender.

=== National Deputy (2009–2017) ===
Costa was elected National Deputy for Santa Cruz in 2009 and re-elected in 2013, serving until 2017.

=== National Senator (2017–2023) ===
In the 2017 legislative election Costa won a seat in the Argentine Senate for Santa Cruz. He took the oath on 29 November 2017, with the term beginning on 10 December 2017. His Senate tenure ended on 10 December 2023, when José María Carambia and Natalia Gadano assumed two of Santa Cruz's seats following the 2023 election.

=== Gubernatorial bids in 2015 and 2019 ===
Costa headed the opposition slate in the 2015 Santa Cruz provincial election|2015 gubernatorial election. Under the province's Ley de Lemas system in force at the time, Alicia Kirchner was elected governor despite Costa's sub-lema obtaining the largest individual vote; this outcome is reflected in the official results. He ran again in 2019, when Alicia Kirchner secured re-election; English-language coverage and local tallies reported her victory over Costa's coalition list.

== Wealth and business interests ==
Based on his public financial disclosures, national media have repeatedly ranked Costa among the wealthiest members of Congress during the 2010s and 2020s.

== Personal life ==
Costa lived for over a decade with Argentine politician Mariana Zuvic; the couple separated in 2019.

== Electoral system note ==
Santa Cruz used Ley de Lemas for provincial offices until its repeal in 2024, a mechanism that aggregates sub-lists within a broader party label.
