= Virginia María García =

Argentinian politician

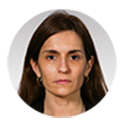
Virginia María García

Virginia María García (1978) is an Argentine politician who was a national senator of the Front for Victory for Santa Cruz Province.
