= Daniel Lovera =

Argentine politician

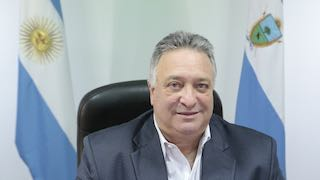

National Senator
- In office 10 December 2015 – 10 December 2021
- Constituency: La Pampa

Provincial Deputy of La Pampa
- In office 10 December 2007 – 10 December 2015

Personal details
- Born: 7 February 1965 (age 61) General Pico, Argentina
- Party: Justicialist Party
- Other political affiliations: Frente de Todos (since 2019)

Daniel Aníbal Lovera (born 7 February 1965) is an Argentine trade unionist and politician, who was a National Senator for La Pampa from 2015 to 2021. He belongs to the Justicialist Party.

== Career ==
Lovera began his career in trade unionism as a delegate of the health insurance fund OSECAC in his home town in 1992. In 1994, he became Secretary of Sports and Tourism of the commercial union of General Pico, and starting in 2002, he was secretary general of the commercial union (being re-elected in 2006, 2010, 2014 and 2018). In 2003, he was elected comptroller of OSECAC nationwide.

In 2007, he was elected to the Legislature of La Pampa, and was re-elected in 2011. From 2011 to 2015 he was president of the Justicialist Party parliamentary bloc in the legislature. In 2013, during his time as a deputy of La Pampa, he introduced a bill to limit the working hours of commercial establishments in the province: the bill was approved unanimously.

=== National senator ===
In the 2015 legislative election, Lovera was the first candidate in the Front for Victory (FPV) list to the National Senate, followed by Norma Durango. The FPV list won 45.85% of the vote and was the most-voted list in the province, granting both Lovera and Durango the two seats for the majority as per the Senate's limited voting system. He was sworn in on 4 December 2015. Lovera originally formed part of the Front for Victory bloc, but joined most other FPV senators in breaking away and forming the Argentina Federal bloc following the 2017 legislative election. Following the 2019 general election, Lovera formed part of the Frente de Todos bloc alongside most other peronist senators.

As senator, Lovera formed part of the parliamentary commissions on Health, Constitutional Affairs, and Agriculture, Livestock and Fishing, and he presided the commission on Labour and Social Prevision. He was a supporter of the legalisation of abortion in Argentina, voting in favour the two Voluntary Interruption of Pregnancy bill debated by the Argentine Congress in 2018 and 2020. During the 2020 debate, Lovera stated that "in a fair country, little girls are not mothers and no person is forced to gestate".

Lovera did not stand for re-election in 2021, and his term expired on 10 December 2021.
