= Liliana Fellner =

Argentine politician

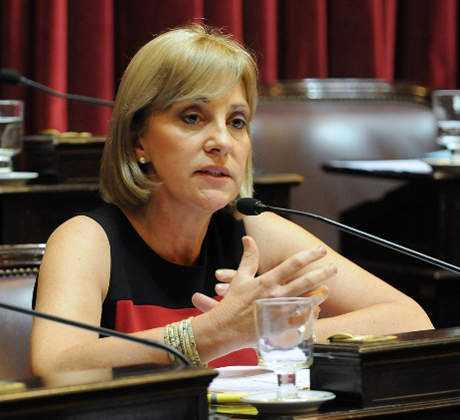

National Senator
- In office 10 December 2005 – 10 December 2017
- Constituency: Jujuy

National Deputy
- In office 10 December 2003 – 10 December 2005
- Constituency: Jujuy

Personal details
- Born: 28 February 1957 (age 69) San Salvador de Jujuy, Jujuy Province, Argentina
- Party: Kolina; Front for Victory (2003–2017)

Liliana Beatriz Fellner (born 28 February 1957) is an Argentine politician. She was a National Senator representing Jujuy Province from 2005 to 2017, and a National Deputy elected in the same province from 2003 to 2005.

She is a member of the Kolina party, founded by Alicia Kirchner.

== Career ==
Fellner received a diploma in biochemistry in 1982 from the National University of Tucumán and among other postgraduate courses gained her Masters in Administration at the Instituto Populorum Progressio in San Salvador de Jujuy. She worked at the National University of Tucumán and the National University of Jujuy and at research institutes.

In 1999, Fellner was appointed Secretary of Culture and Tourism for the Province of Jujuy and led the successful bid to list the Quebrada de Humahuaca as a UNESCO World Heritage Site 2002-03. In 2003 she was elected as a national deputy and in 2005 she was elected to the Argentine Senate for Jujuy.

Fellner's brother is Eduardo Fellner, former governor of Jujuy and President of the Chamber of Deputies.
