= Marina Riofrío =

Argentine politician

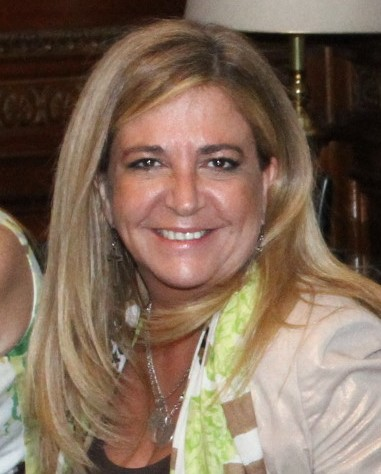

National Senator
- In office 10 December 2005 – 10 December 2017
- Constituency: San Juan

Personal details
- Born: Marina Raquel Riofrío; 30 May 1958 (age 67) San Juan, San Juan Province, Argentina
- Party: Justicialist Party; Front for Victory (2003–2017)

Marina Raquel Riofrío (born 30 May 1958) is an Argentine Justicialist Party politician. She was a member of the Argentine Senate representing San Juan Province in the majority block of the Front for Victory from 2005 to 2017.

Riofrío graduated in 1986 as a lawyer from the National University of Córdoba. From 1986 she was an adviser to the San Juan Ministry of Economy and from 1990 to 1991 she was adviser to the Directorate of Tourism. Following several years as a member of the permanent body of lawyers at the Office of the Public Prosecutor of San Juan, in 1996 she became Director of the Legal and Technical Directorate of the Province. In 1998 she became national coordinator of the National Pensions Commission under the Social Development Ministry.

In 1999, Riofrío was elected as a councillor to the San Juan city council, serving until 2003 when she returned to the provincial government as Subsecretary of Development and Family Promotion. In 2005 she was elected to the Argentine Senate. She is a member of the Argentine delegation to the Latin American Parliament.
