= Ada Itúrrez de Cappellini =

Argentine politician

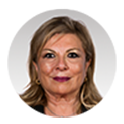

National Senator
- In office 10 December 2007 – 10 December 2019
- Constituency: Santiago del Estero

Personal details
- Born: 2 June 1959 (age 66) Villa Ojo de Agua, Santiago del Estero Province, Argentina
- Party: Justicialist Party; Civic Front for Santiago
- Spouse: Rodolfo Lino Cappellini

Ada Rosa del Valle Itúrrez de Cappellini is an Argentine Justicialist Party politician. She was a National Senator for Santiago del Estero Province from 2007 to 2019, elected for the Civic Front for Santiago and supporting the majority block of the Front for Victory.

Cappellini served as Mayor of Villa Ojo de Agua, a position later held by her husband. She then served as a provincial deputy. In the provincial legislature she led the Bases Populares block. In 2007 Cappellini was elected to the Argentine Senate for the Civic Front of Santiago, a front formed in 2005 by Radicals and Peronists. She and her fellow Civic Front senator Emilio Rached form their own block but support the Kirchners' Front for Victory.
