= Alfredo Martínez (politician) =

Argentine politician

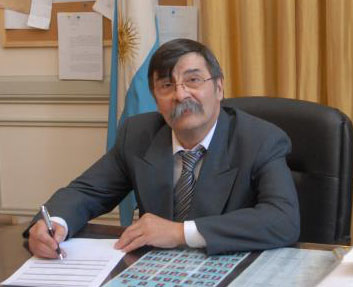

National Senator
- In office 10 December 2005 – 10 December 2017
- Constituency: Santa Cruz

National Deputy
- In office 2001–2005
- Constituency: Santa Cruz

Mayor of Río Gallegos
- In office 1991–1999

Personal details
- Born: 6 September 1951 (age 74)
- Party: Radical Civic Union
- Spouse: Eva María Henríquez
- Profession: Architect

Alfredo Anselmo "Fredi" Martínez (born 6 September 1951) is an Argentine Radical Civic Union (UCR) politician. He sat in the Argentine Senate representing Santa Cruz Province from 2005 to 2017.

Martínez was educated in Río Gallegos, Santa Cruz and Ramos Mejía, Buenos Aires, then graduated as an architect from the National University of La Plata. He worked in construction, tourism and for family businesses, and was President of the provincial architects' society 1985–86.

From 1987, Martínez acted as adviser to the Radical councillors in Río Gallegos. In 1991 he was elected Mayor of Río Gallegos, and was re-elected in 1995 for a second term. In 2001 he was elected as a National Deputy, serving as secretary of the Public Works Committee, then President of the Housing and Urban Planning Committee. In 2003, Martínez stood for governor of Santa Cruz, coming in second with 27.4%, well behind Justicialist Sergio Acevedo with 71.7%.

Martínez was elected a Senator in 2005. In 2007 Martínez stood in the primaries to be the Radical candidate for governor of Santa Cruz but lost to businessman Eduardo Costa.
