= Silvia del Rosario Giacoppo =

Argentine politician (born 1959)

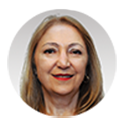

Councillor of Magistracy
- Incumbent
- Assumed office 10 December 2019
- Appointed by: Senate

National Senator
- Incumbent
- Assumed office 10 December 2015
- Constituency: Jujuy

Mayor of Monterrico
- In office 10 December 1987 – 10 December 1991
- Succeeded by: Juan Carlos Manente

Personal details
- Born: 1 May 1959 (age 67) San Salvador de Jujuy, Argentina
- Party: Radical Civic Union
- Other political affiliations: Juntos por el Cambio (since 2015)
- Education: Universidad del Norte de Santo Tomás de Aquino

Silvia del Rosario Giacoppo (born 1 May 1959) is an Argentine politician of the Radical Civic Union. She has served as a National Senator for Jujuy Province since 2015 and as a member of the Council of Magistracy of the Nation since 2019. Giacoppo previously served as intendenta (mayor) of Monterrico, Jujuy.

== Early life ==
Giacoppo was born on 1 May 1959 in San Salvador de Jujuy to a family of Sammarinese descent. She studied law at the Universidad del Norte de Santo Tomás de Aquino, in Tucumán, graduating in 1984. She has a post-graduate degree.

She practiced law in her hometown and in the town of Monterrico, where she has also worked as a high school teacher and as a tobacco producer.

== Political career ==
A longtime member of the Radical Civic Union (UCR), Giacoppo served as member of the party's national congress in numerous occasions. In 1987, she was elected as intendenta (mayor) of Monterrico, becoming the first person to be elected to the post.

At the 2011 legislative election, she was the second candidate to the National Senate on the UDESO (UCR) list, behind Gerardo Morales. With 29.14% of the vote, the UDESO list came second, trailing behind the Front for Victory list, and only Morales was elected as the minority seat. Morales resigned in 2015 to assume office as governor of Jujuy, and Giacoppo was called to fill in the remainder of Morales' six-year term.

Giacoppo ran for re-election as the second candidate in the Cambiemos list in the 2017 legislative election, behind Mario Fiad. In 2018, she voted in favour of President Mauricio Macri's pension reform and against the Voluntary Interruption of Pregnancy Bill, which would have legalised abortion in Argentina.

In 2019, she was appointed as one of the Senate's representatives in the Council of Magistracy of the Nation. Since 2020, she presides the parliamentary commission on tourism, and serves as vice-president of the general legislation commission. She is also a member of the commissions on constitutional affairs, justice, regional economies, labour and social prevision, women's affairs, and agriculture, livestock and fishing.
