= María Laura Leguizamón =

Argentine politician

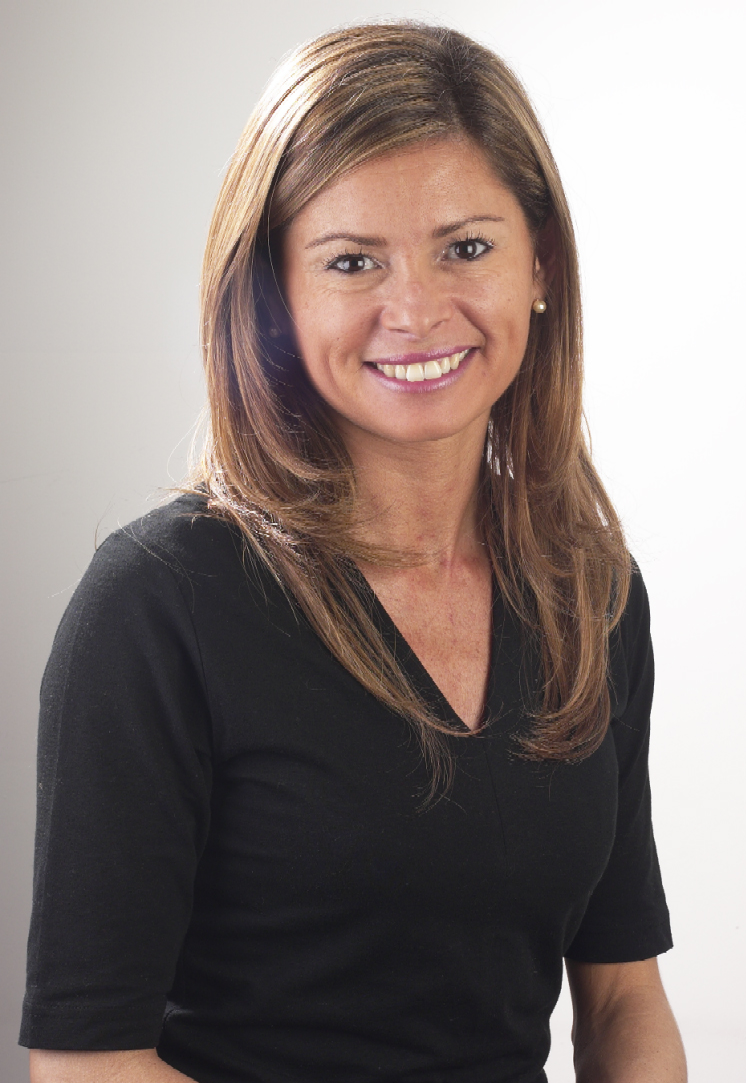

National Senator
- In office 10 December 2011 – 10 December 2017
- Constituency: Buenos Aires
- In office 26 November 2003 – 10 December 2007
- Constituency: City of Buenos Aires

National Deputy
- In office 19 December 2007 – 9 December 2011
- Constituency: Buenos Aires
- In office 10 December 1993 – 10 December 1997
- Constituency: Buenos Aires

Legislator of the City of Buenos Aires
- In office 7 August 2000 – 26 May 2003

Personal details
- Born: 21 January 1965 (age 61) La Plata, Buenos Aires Province, Argentina
- Party: Justicialist Party; Front for Victory (2003–2017)
- Profession: Lawyer, notary

María Laura Leguizamón (born 21 January 1965) is an Argentine Justicialist Party politician. She was a National Senator for Buenos Aires Province from 2011 to 2017 and for the City of Buenos Aires from 2003 to 2007. She also served in the Argentine Chamber of Deputies and in the Buenos Aires City Legislature.

Leguizamón was born in La Plata and graduated as a lawyer and notary from the University of La Plata. She worked as an official for the government of Buenos Aires Province.

In 1993 Leguizamón was elected to the Argentine Chamber of Deputies, serving until 1997. In 2000 she became a legislator in the city of Buenos Aires and in 2003 she became the youngest senator. She was appointed to replace the deceased Socialist senator Alfredo Bravo amid some controversy, since normally the former senator's party is allowed to nominate a replacement, but Bravo's electoral coalition had subsequently collapsed.

Leguizamón sat in the Front for Victory block of President Néstor Kirchner and her term ended in 2007. She had been expected to stand again for the Senate, but was instead placed tenth on the Front for Victory's list for Deputies in Buenos Aires Province. She returned to the Chamber of Deputies in December 2007.

Leguizamón's brother, Aníbal Leguizamón, also became a Deputy in 2007, opposed to the FPV bloc.
