= Marcelo Fuentes =

Argentine politician

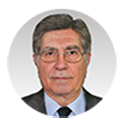

National Senator
- In office 10 December 2007 – 10 December 2019
- Constituency: Neuquén

Personal details
- Party: Justicialist Party

Marcelo Jorge Fuentes (born 1948 in La Plata) is an Argentine Justicialist Party politician. He was a National Senator for the Neuquén Province for the Frente de Todos. In 2019, Fuentes, became Parliamentary Secretary to the Argentine Senate.

Fuentes graduated as a lawyer from the National University of La Plata in 1973 and became an adviser to the Federation of Rural Workers and later advised other trade unions.

Fuentes was subsecretary of Institutional Relations in the Argentine Foreign Ministry. In 2007 he was elected to the Argentine Senate.

- Senate Positions: He was the Chairman of the Senate’s Constitutional Affairs Committee, the Chairman of the Senate’s Joint Committee on Intelligence Affairs, and the Head of the Front for Victory (Frente para la Victoria) block in the Senate.
- Parliamentary Secretary: In 2019, he was appointed as the Parliamentary Secretary of the Argentine Senate.
