= Silvina García Larraburu =

Argentine politician

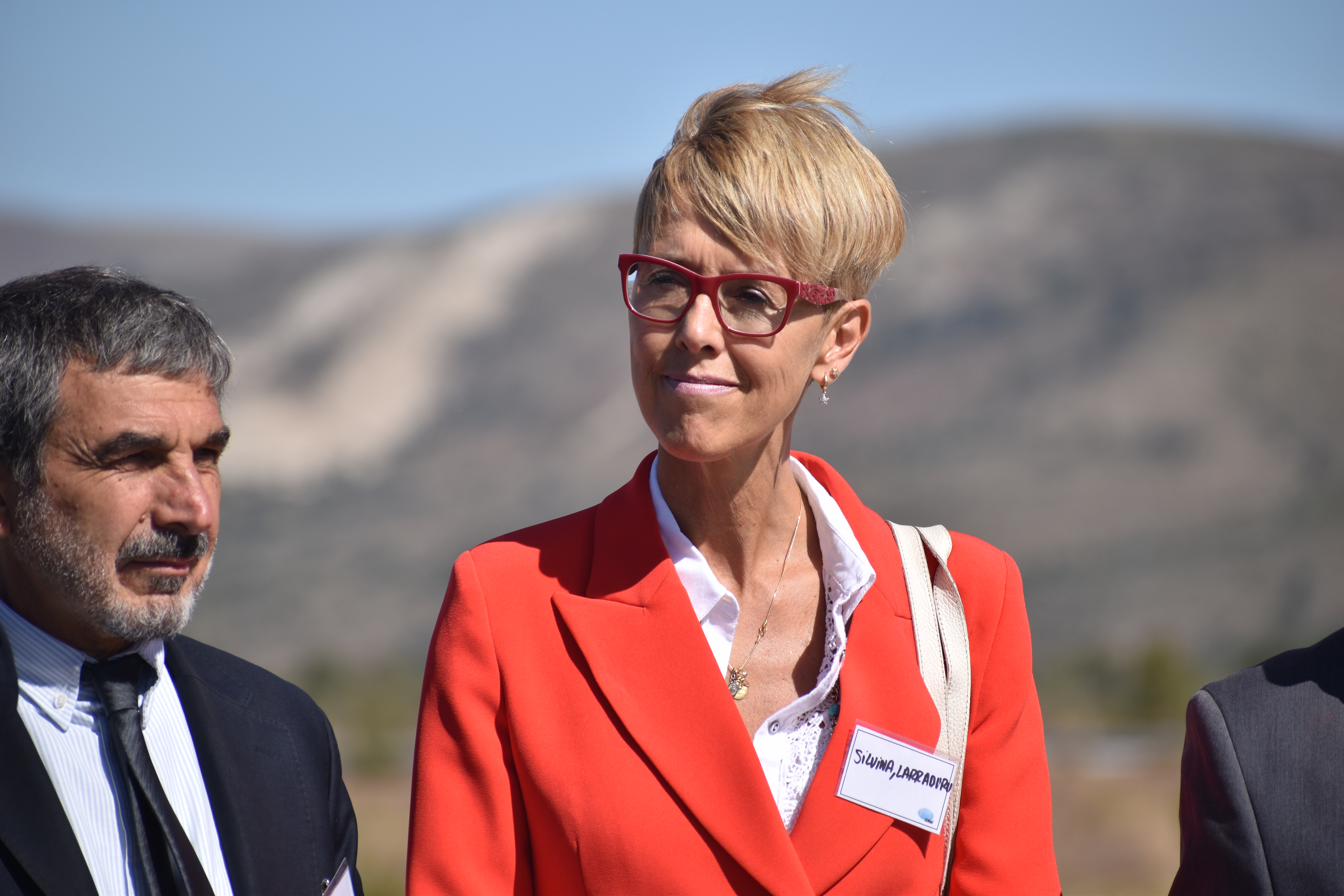

National Senator
- In office 10 December 2013 – 10 December 2025
- Constituency: Río Negro

National Deputy
- In office 10 December 2011 – 10 December 2013
- Constituency: Río Negro

Provincial Legislator of Río Negro
- In office 10 December 2007 – 10 December 2011
- Constituency: Provincial list

Personal details
- Born: 16 January 1969 (age 57) San Carlos de Bariloche, Argentina
- Party: Justicialist Party
- Other political affiliations: Front for Victory (2003–2017); Citizen's Unity (2017–2019); Frente de Todos (since 2019)
- Education: Argentine University of Enterprise

Silvina Marcela García Larraburu (born 16 January 1969) is an Argentine politician. She previously served as a National Senator for Río Negro Province from 2013 to 2025, as a National Deputy from 2011 to 2013, and as a provincial legislator in Río Negro.

== Early life and education ==
García Larraburu was born on 16 January 1969 in San Carlos de Bariloche, to a family of Basque descent. She comes from a politically active family, and her father was active in the peronist movement, while her mother was a sympathizer of the Radical Civic Union. Her great-grandfather, Martín Larraburu, was a mayor in La Pampa.

García Larraburu has a degree in Public Relations from the Argentine University of Enterprise (UADE), having graduated in 1991.

== Political career ==
García Larraburu's political career began in the Justicialist Party. From 1995 to 1999, she was director of public relations at the municipality of San Carlos de Bariloche, during the mayorship of César Miguel. She was elected to the city council of Bariloche in 2003 as part of the Front for Victory (FPV). Later, in 2007, she was elected to the legislature of Río Negro Province.

In 2011, García Larraburu was the first candidate in the Front for Victory list to the Chamber of Deputies in Río Negro; the list was the most voted, with 70.10% of the vote, and García Larraburu was elected (alongside all the other candidates in the list).

Two years after being elected as deputy, García Larraburu was the second FPV candidate to the National Senate in Río Negro in the 2013 legislative election, behind Miguel Ángel Pichetto. The FPV list was the most voted in the province, with 49.92% of the vote, and the FPV took the two seats for the majority. She originally formed part of the Front for Victory bloc, later joining most other Justicialist Party senators in breaking away and forming the Argentina Federal bloc following the 2017 legislative election. She would, eventually, return to the FPV bloc in 2018.

As senator, García Larraburu formed part of the parliamentary commissions on Administrative and Municipal Affairs, Women's Affairs, Regional Economies and Small Businesses, Science and Technology, Tourism, and Environment. Citing religious grounds, she was the sole member of the FPV bloc to vote against the 2018 Voluntary Interruption of Pregnancy bill, which would have made abortion legal in Argentina and had been approved by the lower house of Congress but was struck down by the Senate. When a similar bill was presented before the Senate again in 2020, García Larraburu changed her position and voted in favour of the measure, stating she had understood the issue of abortion was "beyond [her] personal beliefs", instead deserving the treatment of a "public health issue."

She was re-elected for a second term in 2019, as the second candidate in the Frente de Todos (FDT) list, behind Martín Doñate. The list was the most voted, with 50.46% of the vote, granting the FDT the two majority seats.
