= Inés Blas =

Argentine politician (born 1959)

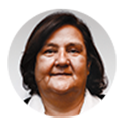

National Senator
- In office 10 December 2011 – 10 December 2021
- Constituency: Catamarca

Personal details
- Born: 21 April 1959 (age 67) Belén, Catamarca, Argentina
- Party: Justicialist Party
- Other political affiliations: Front for Victory (2003–2017); Frente de Todos (since 2019)
- Education: National University of Catamarca

Inés Imelda Blas (born 21 April 1959) is an Argentine social worker and politician, who was a National Senator for Catamarca Province from 2011 to 2021. She belongs to the Justicialist Party.

== Early life and career ==
Blas was born on 22 April 1959 in Belén, a small town in Catamarca Province. She finished high school at the Colegio del Carmen y San José, in San Fernando del Valle de Catamarca. Later, she went on to study social work at the National University of Catamarca.

In 1979, she became an administrative employee at the Ministry of Labour and Social Security of Catamarca. From 1987 to 1993, she was a technical worker at the State Secretariat of Science and Technology of Catamarca, and from 1993 to 1996 she was a field technical worker for a promotional programme for PAMI. From 1996 to 2011, she was a delegate of the Ministry of Labour, Employment and Social Security of Argentina in Catamarca, serving in the same position for Tucumán Province from 2008 to 2011.

== Political career ==
In the 2009 legislative election, Blas was the first alternate candidate in the Front for Victory list to the National Senate in Catamarca. When Senator Lucía Corpacci, who had been elected in the FPV list, resigned from her seat in 2011 to take office as governor of Catamarca, Blas was sworn in as senator to fill in the vacancy. She was elected in her own right in the 2015 legislative election, as the second candidate in the Front for Victory list, behind Dalmacio Mera. With 50.65% of the vote, the FPV was the most voted alliance in the province, and both Mera and Blas were elected for the majority as per the limited voting system used for the Argentine upper house. Blas originally formed part of the Front for Victory bloc, but joined most other FPV senators in breaking away and forming the Argentina Federal bloc following the 2017 legislative election. Following the 2019 general election, Blas formed part of the Frente de Todos bloc alongside most other peronist senators.

As senator, Blas formed part of the parliamentary commissions on Women's Affairs, Education and Culture, Foreign Affairs and Worship, Labour and Social Prevision, Population and Human Development, Mining, Energy and Fuels, and National Defense, and presided the commission on Administrative and Municipal Affairs. She presided the commission on Women's Affairs from March to September 2018. She was an opponent of the legalisation of abortion in Argentina, voting against the two Voluntary Interruption of Pregnancy bill debated by the Argentine Congress in 2018 and 2020.

Blas did not stand for re-election in 2021, and her term expired on 10 December 2021.
