= Daniel Pérsico =

Argentine politician

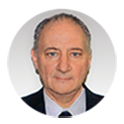

National Senator
- In office 10 December 2005 – 10 December 2017
- Constituency: San Luis

Mayor of San Luis
- In office 13 December 2003 – 9 December 2005
- Preceded by: Carlos Ponce
- Succeeded by: Alfonso Vergés

Personal details
- Born: 31 October 1961 (age 64)
- Party: Justicialist Party
- Profession: Civil engineer

Daniel Raúl Pérsico (born 31 October 1961, San Luis, Argentina) is an Argentine Justicialist Party politician. He sat in the Argentine Senate representing San Luis Province in the majority block of the Front for Victory from 2005 to 2017.

Pérsico qualified as a civil engineer in 1988 from the National University of Córdoba and began working for the provincial government in 1989. In 1996 he joined the municipality of San Luis as Director of Basic Municipal Services, then as Subsecretary of Public Works and Services. From September 2000 until November 2003 he served as Secretary of Public Works and Services.

On 9 November 2003, Pérsico was elected as Mayor of San Luis in an election which took place in the streets rather than official polling places, organised by the outgoing city government of Carlos Ponce. The election had been opposed by Governor Alberto Rodríguez Saá who held his 'official' election on 23 November, won by María Angélica Torrontegui but boycotted by the opposition. There followed a long Supreme Court battle with Governor Rodríguez Saá over the election. While Pérsico supports the official Kirchnerist strand of Peronism, Rodríguez Saá and in particular his brother Adolfo Rodríguez Saá are leading opponents of the Kirchners (and the late Ponce), and San Luis is their stronghold. Eventually the court ruled in favour of Pérsico in February 2005.

In 2005, Pérsico was elected as a national Senator. He had prepared to stand for the governorship in 2007 but stood down as a candidate ahead of the election.
