= Alfredo de Angeli =

Argentine politician

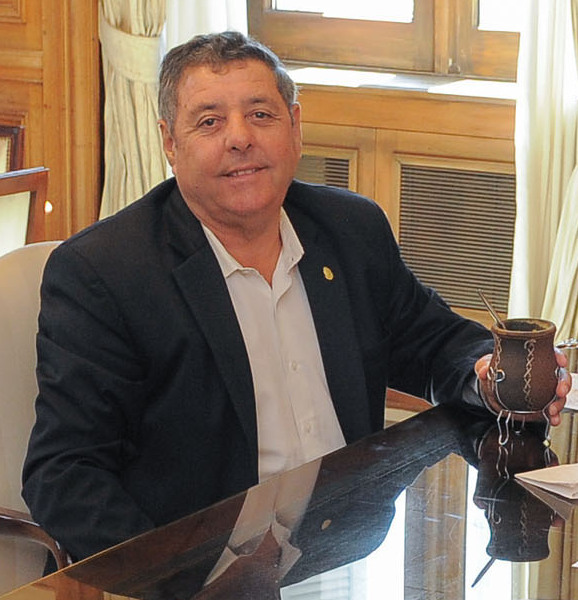

National Senator
- Incumbent
- Assumed office 10 December 2013
- Constituency: Entre Ríos

Personal details
- Born: February 16, 1957 (age 69) María Grande, Argentina
- Party: Republican Proposal
- Other political affiliations: Cambiemos (2015-present)

Alfredo Luis de Angeli (born 16 February 1957) is an Argentine politician, current National Senator for Entre Ríos Province and former rural leader of the Federación Agraria Argentina of Entre Ríos. He became well known during Argentina's longest farmer strike, during which he led one of the hardline groups, blocking Ruta Nacional 14, also known as the Mercosur Road, in Gualeguaychú.

== Biography ==
=== Childhood and youth ===
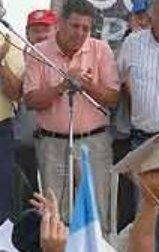
Alfredo de Angeli, small farmer and businessman, rural leader, member of the Federación Agraria Argentina (Argentinian Agricultural Federation) of Entre Ríos.

One of nine brothers, he was born and spent his early years in the Paraná department. In July 1980, he settled in Gualeguaychú, in a town named Arroyo El Sauce. He has an identical twin named Atilio, with whom he is usually confused, and who is also his partner in their business society. His twin is the one who dedicates all his time to the agricultural activity, while Alfredo splits his time between his job and his role as rural leader. Their society rents between 675 and 1,100 hectares (according to different sources) to different owners. They cultivate soybean, corn, sunflower and crop. Nowadays he lives in a house near the beach of El Ñandubaysal at Gualeguaychú.

== Agricultural strike ==
He became famous during the 2008 agricultural strike, the most extensive general lockout in Argentine history. He led one of the toughest sectors and cut to National Route 14, also known as the Mercosur Route.

== National Senator ==
In 2013 he was elected national senator for the Province of Entre Ríos, with the support of political leaders such as the Head of Government of the City of Buenos Aires Mauricio Macri, the deputy Patricia Bullrich, the syndicalist Gerónimo Venegas, the deputy Eduardo Amadeo and the mayor of San Isidro Gustavo Posse, among others. In 2019, he voted against the abortion legalization project.

== See also ==
- 2008 Argentine government conflict with the agricultural sector
- Federación Agraria Argentina
