= Federal Commitment =

Argentine political party

Federal Commitment Compromiso Federal
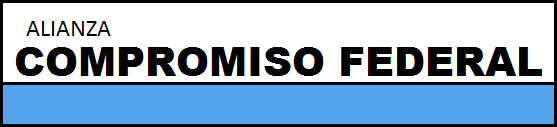
- Leader: Alberto Rodríguez Saá
- President: Josefina Aldana
- Founded: 2011; 15 years ago (as an electoral alliance); 2015; 11 years ago (as a political party)
- Headquarters: San Luis Province
- Youth wing: Young Federal Commitment
- Ideology: Peronism
- Political position: Centre
- National affiliation: Homeland Force
- Seats in the Chamber of Deputies: 4 / 257
- Seats in the Senate: 1 / 72
- Province Governors: 1 / 24
- Politics of Argentina; Political parties; Elections; A: The has also been described as centre-right, and left-wing.

Federal Commitment is a Peronist political party in Argentina formed by the fusion of Es Posible Party and the Independent Movement of Justice and Dignity. The party is currently part of the former governing Unión por la Patria coalition of former President Alberto Fernández and former Vice President Cristina Kirchner since 2019.

== History ==
The Federal Commitment proposal postulates replicating the "San Luis" model at the national level. The province of San Luis, received different distinctions by the United Nations in terms of caring for the environment, and by the former Vice President of the United States and Nobel Peace Prize, Al Gore, who visited the province of San Luis in 2015.

In the national order, the province of San Luis was rated in 2015 as the best managed in the country by private consultants for the seventh consecutive year in terms of Fiscal Efficiency, Social Indicators, Infrastructure, Fiscal Solvency, and Foreign Trade. In addition, in its ambition to create a Silicon Valley, San Luis was positioned as fourth in the ranking of 150 digital metropolises prepared by Motorola.

It was originally a political alliance in 2011 composed of the Green Party, Es Posible, UNIR, the Democratic Party, PAIS Party and Republican Proposal.

San Luis Governor Alberto Rodríguez Saá (2007 and 2011) and Senator Adolfo Rodríguez Saá (2015) were the party's candidates in the general elections.

The party was part of the governing Frente de Todos coalition that supported the successful 2019 Argentine presidential candidate Alberto Fernández during the 2019 Argentine general election. It was also part of the Citizen's Unity between 2017 and 2019.

Since 2023, it is part of the Unión por la Patria coalition which supported Sergio Massa for the 2023 Argentine presidential election.

== Ideology ==
Originally, Federal Commitment was a Federal Peronist party, placed on the centre and centre-right of the political spectrum. Federal Commitment later abandoned Federal Peronism and joined the Kirchnerist Citizen's Unity in 2017. It stated to share the "ideology but not methods" of Kirchnerism, and declared: "We support the Frente de Todos, but we have our differences." It also came to be described as left-wing.

== Electoral history ==
=== Presidential elections ===
Election year	Candidate(s)	Primaries		First Round		Second Round		Result	Note
Election year	Candidate(s)	# votes	% vote	# votes	% vote	# votes	% vote	Result	Note
2011	Alberto Rodríguez Saá	1,749,971	7.80	1,745,354	7.96			✗ Defeated	
2015	Adolfo Rodríguez Saá	472,341	1.99	412,578	1.64			✗ Defeated	
2019	Alberto Fernández	12,205,938	47.79	12,473,709	48.10			✓ Elected	as part of the Everyone's Front Alliance
