= Proyecto Sur =

Political party in Argentina

Project South Proyecto Sur
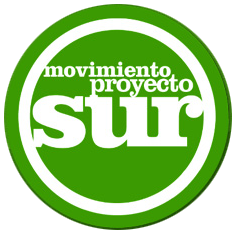
- Leader: Jorge Selser
- Founder: Pino Solanas
- Founded: 2007; 19 years ago
- Headquarters: Buenos Aires, Argentina
- Ideology: Progressivism
- Political position: Centre-left
- National affiliation: Homeland Force
- Seats in the Chamber of Deputies: 0 / 257
- Seats in the Senate: 0 / 72

Proyecto Sur ('Project South') is a progressive political party established in 2007 in Argentina. It was founded and would be led by film maker Pino Solanas, who ran on the Proyecto Sur ticket for president in 2007 and for Mayor of Buenos Aires in 2011.

The party's progressive platform centers on the nationalization of energy, petroleum, rail, and shipping which, as former state enterprises, had been privatized during the 1989–99 administration of President Carlos Menem.

Proyecto Sur maintains a think tank, the Instituto Argentino de Propuestas (Argentine Institute for Proposals).

== History ==
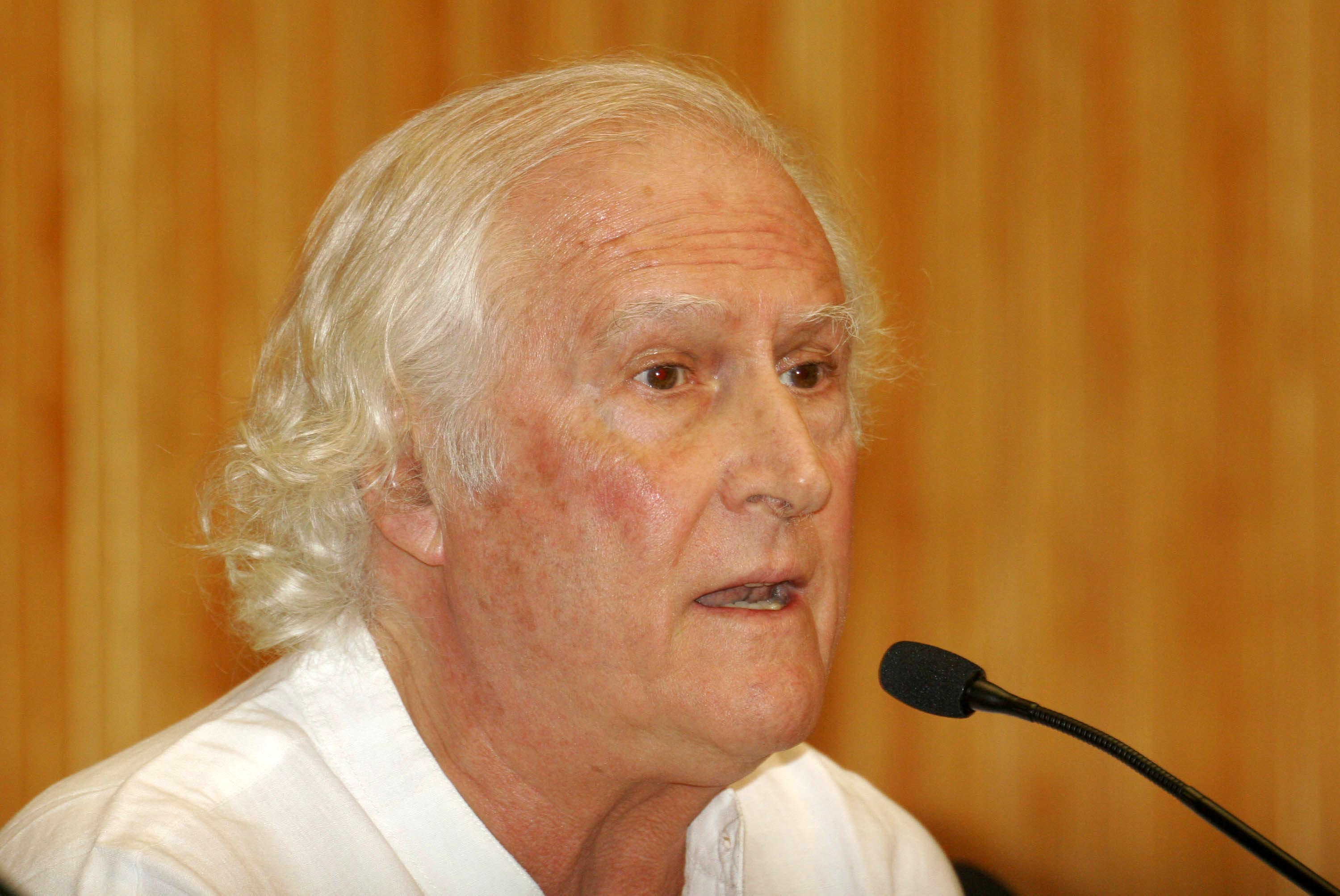
Fernando "Pino" Solanas

The party developed in part from the Frente Grande, a political party established in 1993 by with Congressman Carlos Álvarez, film-maker Pino Solanas, human rights activist Graciela Fernández Meijide and others disaffected with President Carlos Menem's turn to the right. Solanas, a renowned film maker in the political cinema genre, established Proyecto Sur in August 2007 ahead of his campaign for president in that year's general elections. The ticket obtained fifth place (1.6%) and elected one Congressman. Solanas, however, was satisfied with the results, and declared that "we have planted our flag."

Proyecto Sur elected four Congressmen in the 2009 mid-term elections. The party later sealed alliances with a number of other left-wing parties, including Solidarity and Equality, the MST, Free of the South Movement, the Authentic Socialist Party, and the Revolutionary Communist Party. These alliances brought the Proyecto Sur-led caucus in the Argentine Chamber of Deputies to 11 members. Solanas entered into an alliance with the Socialist Party-led Broad Progressive Front in June 2011 for the general elections. He left the Front within a week, however, and announced the party and its allies would run on an independent Proyecto Sur slate; he nominated Congresswoman Alcira Argumedo as their candidate for president.

The party was part of the Frente de Todos coalition during the 2019 Argentine general election.
