= Roberto Basualdo =

Argentine politician

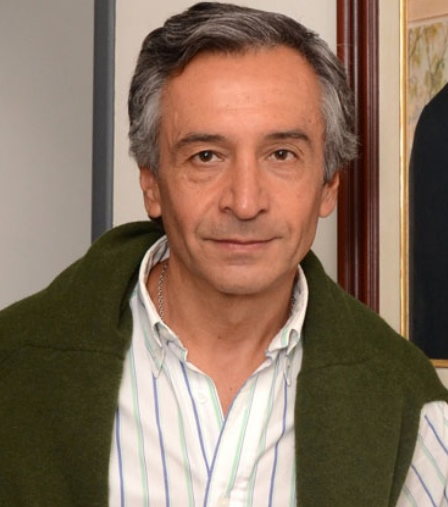

National Senator
- In office 10 December 2005 – 10 December 2023
- Constituency: San Juan

National Deputy
- In office 2001–2005
- Constituency: San Juan

Personal details
- Party: Production and Labour (since 2015); Justicialist Party (until 2015)
- Profession: Businessman

Roberto Gustavo Basualdo (b. 1957) is an Argentine politician, formerly of the Justicialist Party (PJ), now in Cambiemos. He sat in the Argentine Senate representing San Juan Province (Argentina) for the Production and Labour party from 2005 to 2023.

In 1976, Basualdo began a motor racing career, competing in the Cuyo district and gaining five championships. In 1990 he and his father started a company, Roberto Basualdo S.A., which sells perfumes and cleaning products. He became involved in politics as a Justicialist in 1993, standing as running mate to Olga Riutort in the 1995 election for governor. In 1999, he stood for the mayoralty of San Juan and in 2001 he was elected a national deputy.

Basualdo is a dissident Peronist opposed to the mainstream of his party in the province but is closer to the national leadership of the PJ. He set up his own party, the Life and Commitment Movement. In 2003, he stood for the governorship of San Juan, losing to the Justicialist José Luis Gioja by 41.5% to 30.8%, with incumbent governor Wbaldino Acosta third with 19%. He backed Adolfo Rodríguez Saá for the presidency in that year.

He was elected to the Senate in 2005. In the Senate he sits in his own block, rather than the ruling Front for Victory, although he supported the election of President Cristina Fernández de Kirchner. In recent years, his party has leached support back to the mainstream of the PJ. In 2007 he stood once again against Gioja for the governorship, heading the Front for Change. He made opposition of opencast mining a key element of his campaign.

From 2007, Basualdo was the second vice-president of the Senate, coordinating the senators from smaller parties from the interior of the country.
