= Production and Labour =

Argentine political party

Production and Labour Producción y Trabajo
- President: Roberto Basualdo
- Founded: 2005; 21 years ago
- Membership (2017): 2,692
- Ideology: Peronism
- Political position: Right-wing
- National affiliation: Juntos por el Cambio
- Argentine Chamber of Deputies (San Juan seats): 2 / 6
- Argentine Senate (San Juan seats): 1 / 3
- Seats in the San Juan Legislature: 6 / 36

Production and Labour (Spanish: Producción y Trabajo) is a minor Peronist political party in San Juan Province, Argentina. Its founder and leader is Roberto Basualdo, who is currently a sitting National Senator and was a National Deputy from 2001 to 2005. The party was formed in 2005 ahead of the legislative election in San Juan, where it became the first minority in the provincial Senate. It is currently part of the Juntos por el Cambio coalition.

In addition to the Senate, the party also has representation in the Chamber of Deputies through deputy Marcelo Orrego, elected in 2019. Orrego sits in the Juntos por el Cambio parliamentary group.
