= List of Argentine deputies, 2007–2009 =

This is list of members of the Argentine Chamber of Deputies from 10 December 2007 to 9 December 2009.

== Composition ==
=== By province ===
Province	Deputies	Population (2010)
Buenos Aires	70	15,625,084
Buenos Aires City	25	2,890,151
Catamarca	5	367,828
Chaco	7	1,053,466
Chubut	5	506,668
Córdoba	18	3,304,825
Corrientes	7	993,338
Entre Ríos	9	1,236,300
Formosa	5	527,895
Jujuy	6	672,260
La Pampa	5	316,940
La Rioja	5	331,847
Mendoza	10	1,741,610
Misiones	7	1,097,829
Neuquén	5	550,334
Río Negro	5	633,374
Salta	7	1,215,207
San Juan	6	680,427
San Luis	5	431,588
Santa Cruz	5	272,524
Santa Fe	19	3,200,736
Santiago del Estero	7	896,461
Tierra del Fuego	5	126,190
Tucumán	9	1,448,200

=== By political groups ===
as of 9 December 2009

Bloc	Seats	Leader
Front for Victory–PJ	129	Agustín Rossi
Radical Civic Union	25	Oscar Raúl Aguad
Civic Coalition–ARI–GEN	18	Adrián Pérez
Concertation	11	Daniel Katz
Socialist Party	10	Silvia Augsburger
PRO	9	Federico Pinedo
Solidarity and Equality–ARI TDF	9	Eduardo Macaluse
Civic Front for Santiago	6	Daniel Agustín Brue
Justice, Unity and Liberty Front	6	Luis Lusquiños
Popular and Social Encounter	4	Sergio Ariel Basteiro
Light Blue and White Union	4	Francisco de Narváez
Neuquén People's Movement	3	Alicia Marcela Comelli
New Party	2	Francisco José Delich
Salta Renewal Party	2	María Inés Diez
Civic and Social Front of Catamarca	2	Genaro Aurelio Collantes
Frente de Todos	2	José María Roldán
Single-member blocs	15	—N/a
Source: hcdn.gov.ar (archived)

== Election cycles ==
Election	Term	
Election	Start	End
2005	10 December 2005	9 December 2009
2007	10 December 2007	9 December 2011

== List of deputies ==
Province	Deputy	Party	Term	
Province	Deputy	Party	From	To
Buenos Aires	Horacio Alberto Alcuaz	Civic Coalition–ARI–GEN	2007	2011
Buenos Aires	Juan José Álvarez	Light Blue and White Union	2007	2011
Buenos Aires	Marcelo Eduardo Amenta	Recreate for Growth	2005	2009
Buenos Aires	Octavio Argüello	Front for Victory–PJ	2007	2011
Buenos Aires	Pedro José Azcoiti	Radical Civic Union	2005	2009
Buenos Aires	Vilma Rosana Baragiola	Radical Civic Union	2005	2009
Buenos Aires	Sergio Ariel Basteiro	Popular and Social Encounter	2007	2011
Buenos Aires	Claudia Alicia Bernazza	Front for Victory–PJ	2007 (Note: Since 19 September 2007. Replaced Graciela Rosso.)	2009
Buenos Aires	Marcela Alejandra Bianchi Silvestre	Front for Victory–PJ	2005	2009
Buenos Aires	Gloria Mercedes Bidegain	Front for Victory–PJ	2007	2011
Buenos Aires	Eugenio Burzaco	PRO	2005	2009
Buenos Aires	Dante Alberto Camaño	National Syndicalist	2005	2009
Buenos Aires	Graciela Camaño	Front for Victory–PJ	2007	2011
Buenos Aires	Elisa Beatriz Carca	Civic Coalition–ARI–GEN	2007	2011
Buenos Aires	Remo Gerardo Carlotto	Front for Victory–PJ	2005	2009
Buenos Aires	Nora Noemí César	Front for Victory–PJ	2005	2009
Buenos Aires	Luis Francisco Jorge Cicogna	Front for Victory–PJ	2005	2009
Buenos Aires	Diana Beatriz Conti	Front for Victory–PJ	2005	2009
Buenos Aires	Ricardo Oscar Cuccovillo	Socialist Party	2007	2011
Buenos Aires	Francisco de Narváez	Light Blue and White Union	2005	2009
Buenos Aires	Edgardo Fernando Depetri	Front for Victory–PJ	2005	2009
Buenos Aires	Juliana Di Tullio	Front for Victory–PJ	2005	2009
Buenos Aires	José María Díaz Bancalari	Front for Victory–PJ	2007	2011
Buenos Aires	Victoria Analía Donda Pérez	Popular and Social Encounter	2007	2011
Buenos Aires	Miguel Dante Dovena	Front for Victory–PJ	2005	2009
Buenos Aires	Norberto Pedro Erro	Concertation	2007	2011
Buenos Aires	Marcelo Omar Fernández	Front for Victory–PJ	2005	2009
Buenos Aires	Francisco José Ferro	Civic Coalition–ARI–GEN	2005	2009
Buenos Aires	Héctor "Toty" Flores	Civic Coalition–ARI–GEN	2007	2011
Buenos Aires	María Teresa García	Front for Victory–PJ	2005	2009
Buenos Aires	Patricia Susana Gardella	Light Blue and White Union	2007	2011
Buenos Aires	Graciela María Giannettasio	Front for Victory–PJ	2007	2011
Buenos Aires	Christian Alejandro Gribaudo	PRO	2007	2011
Buenos Aires	Luis Alfredo Ilarregui	Front for Victory–PJ	2005	2009
Buenos Aires	Daniel Katz	Concertation	2007	2011
Buenos Aires	Carlos Miguel Kunkel	Front for Victory–PJ	2005	2009
Buenos Aires	Rubén Orfel Lanceta	Radical Civic Union	2007	2011
Buenos Aires	Jorge Alberto Landau	Front for Victory–PJ	2007	2011
Buenos Aires	Julio Rubén Ledesma	Light Blue and White Union	2005	2009
Buenos Aires	María Laura Leguizamón	Front for Victory–PJ	2007	2011
Buenos Aires	María Virginia Linares	Civic Coalition–ARI–GEN	2007	2011
Buenos Aires	Edith Olga Llanos	Front for Victory–PJ	2007 (Note: Since 10 December 2007. Replaced Alberto Balestrini.)	2009
Buenos Aires	Juan Carlos Lorges	Front for Victory–PJ	2009 (Note: Since 20 May 2009. Replaced Felipe Solá.)	2011
Buenos Aires	Eduardo Gabriel Macaluse	Solidarity and Equality–ARI TDF	2007	2011
Buenos Aires	Juan Carlos Morán	Civic Coalition–ARI–GEN	2007	2011
Buenos Aires	Carlos Julio Moreno	Front for Victory–PJ	2005	2009
Buenos Aires	Mabel Hilda Müller	Front for Victory–PJ	2005	2009
Buenos Aires	Lidia Lucía Naím	Solidarity and Equality–ARI TDF	2005	2009
Buenos Aires	Ariel Osvaldo Eloy Pasini	Front for Victory–PJ	2007	2011
Buenos Aires	Adrián Pérez	Civic Coalition–ARI–GEN	2007	2011
Buenos Aires	Héctor Norberto Porto	Front for Victory–PJ	2005	2009
Buenos Aires	Adriana Victoria Puiggrós	Front for Victory–PJ	2007	2011
Buenos Aires	Elsa Siria Quiroz	Civic Coalition–ARI–GEN	2007	2011
Buenos Aires	Carlos Alberto Raimundi	Solidarity and Equality–ARI TDF	2005	2009
Buenos Aires	Héctor Pedro Recalde	Front for Victory–PJ	2005	2009
Buenos Aires	María del Carmen Cecilia Rico	Front for Victory–PJ	2005	2009
Buenos Aires	Sandra Adriana Rioboo	Radical Civic Union	2007	2011
Buenos Aires	Marcela Virginia Rodríguez	Civic Coalition–ARI–GEN	2005	2009
Buenos Aires	Ramón Ruiz	Front for Victory–PJ	2007	2010 (Note: Died on 20 September 2010. Replaced by Gustavo Alberto Dutto.)
Buenos Aires	Jorge Emilio Sarghini	National Justicialist	2005	2009
Buenos Aires	Lidia Elsa "Pinky" Satragno	PRO	2007	2011
Buenos Aires	Adela Rosa Segarra	Front for Victory–PJ	2007	2011
Buenos Aires	Gustavo Eduardo Serebrinsky	Concertation	2007	2011
Buenos Aires	Juan Carlos Sluga	Front for Victory–PJ	2007	2011
Buenos Aires	Felipe Carlos Solá	Front for Victory–PJ	2007	2010 (Note: Resigned on 11 May 2009. Replaced by Juan Carlos Lorges.)
Buenos Aires	Paola Rosana Spatola	Peronist Guard	2005	2009
Buenos Aires	Adriana Elisa Tomaz	Federalist Unity	2005	2009
Buenos Aires	Silvia Beatriz Vázquez de Tabernise	Concertation	2007	2011
Buenos Aires	Jorge Antonio Villaverde	Front for Victory–PJ	2005	2009
Buenos Aires	Mariano Federico West	Front for Victory–PJ	2005	2009
Buenos Aires City	María Paula Bertol	PRO	2005	2009
Buenos Aires City	Delia Beatriz Bisutti	Solidarity and Equality–ARI TDF	2005	2009
Buenos Aires City	Miguel Luis Bonasso	Dialogue for Buenos Aires	2007	2011
Buenos Aires City	Esteban José Bullrich	PRO	2005	2009
Buenos Aires City	Patricia Bullrich	Civic Coalition–ARI–GEN	2007	2011
Buenos Aires City	Robert Vincent "Roy" Cortina	Socialist Party	2007	2011
Buenos Aires City	Jorge Edmundo Coscia	Front for Victory–PJ	2005	2009
Buenos Aires City	Luis Alberto Galvalisi	PRO	2005	2009
Buenos Aires City	Emilio Arturo García Méndez	Solidarity and Equality–ARI TDF	2005	2009
Buenos Aires City	Claudia Fernanda Gil Lozano	Civic Coalition–ARI–GEN	2007	2011
Buenos Aires City	Nora Raquel Ginzburg	Front for Civic Rights	2005	2009
Buenos Aires City	Silvana Myriam Giudici	Radical Civic Union	2007	2011
Buenos Aires City	María América González	Solidarity and Equality–ARI TDF	2005	2009
Buenos Aires City	Juan Carlos Dante Gullo	Front for Victory–PJ	2007	2011
Buenos Aires City	Cynthia Liliana Hotton	PRO	2007	2011
Buenos Aires City	Vilma Lidia Ibarra	Popular and Social Encounter	2007	2011
Buenos Aires City	Fernando Adolfo Iglesias	Civic Coalition–ARI–GEN	2007	2011
Buenos Aires City	María Beatriz Lenz	Front for Victory–PJ	2008 (Note: Since 28 February 2008. Replaced Mercedes Marcó del Pont.)	2009
Buenos Aires City	Eduardo Lorenzo Borocotó	Independent Movement	2005	2009
Buenos Aires City	Claudio Raúl Lozano	Buenos Aires for All	2007	2011
Buenos Aires City	Claudio Marcelo Morgado	Front for Victory–PJ	2007 (Note: Since 7 November 2007. Replaced Rafael Bielsa.)	2009
Buenos Aires City	Mercedes Marcó del Pont	Front for Victory–PJ	2005	2008 (Note: Resigned on 28 February 2008 to take office as president of the Banco de la Nación Argentina. Replaced by María Beatriz Lenz.)
Buenos Aires City	Julián Martín Obiglio	PRO	2005	2009
Buenos Aires City	Federico Pinedo	PRO	2007	2011
Buenos Aires City	María Fernanda Reyes	Civic Coalition–ARI–GEN	2007	2011
Buenos Aires City	Fernando Sánchez	Civic Coalition–ARI–GEN	2005	2009
Catamarca	María Julia Acosta	Front for Victory–PJ	2007	2011
Catamarca	José Luis Barrionuevo	Front for Victory–PJ	2005	2009
Catamarca	Genaro Aurelio Collantes	Civic and Social Front of Catamarca	2005	2009
Catamarca	Raúl Omar Paroli	Civic and Social Front of Catamarca	2007	2011
Catamarca	Eduardo Antonio Pastoriza	For Truth	2005	2009
Chaco	Liliana Amelia Bayonzo	Radical Civic Union	2005	2009
Chaco	Margarita Beatriz Beveraggi	Radical Civic Union	2007 (Note: Since 8 August 2007. Replaced Ángel Rozas.)	2009
Chaco	Viviana Mónica Damilano Grivarello	Front for Victory–PJ	2007	2011
Chaco	Luciano Rafael Fabris	Radical Civic Union	2005	2009
Chaco	Antonio Arnaldo María Morante	Front for Victory–PJ	2007	2011
Chaco	Gladys Beatriz Soto	Front for Victory–PJ	2005	2009
Chaco	Carlos Urlich	Radical Civic Union	2007	2011
Chubut	Rosa Laudelina Chiquichano	Front for Victory–PJ	2007	2011
Chubut	Eva García de Moreno	Front for Victory–PJ	2005	2009
Chubut	Nancy Susana González	Front for Victory–PJ	2006 (Note: Since 11 October 2006. Replaced Aldo Marconetto.)	2009
Chubut	Manuel Amor Morejón	Front for Victory–PJ	2007	2011
Chubut	Juan Mario Pais	Front for Victory–PJ	2007	2011
Córdoba	Oscar Raúl Aguad	Radical Civic Union	2005	2009
Córdoba	César Alfredo Albrisi	Justice, Unity and Liberty Front	2007	2010 (Note: Died on 14 April 2010. Replaced by Daniel Edgardo Asef.)
Córdoba	Mario Rolando Ardid	New Party	2005	2009
Córdoba	Griselda Ángela Baldata	Civic Coalition–ARI–GEN	2007	2011
Córdoba	Nora Esther Bedano	Front for Victory–PJ	2007	2011
Córdoba	Alberto Cantero Gutiérrez	Front for Victory–PJ	2005	2009
Córdoba	Héctor Eduardo del Campillo	Radical Civic Union	2007	2011
Córdoba	Francisco José Delich	New Party	2005	2009
Córdoba	Beatriz Susana Halak	Front for Victory–PJ	2007 (Note: Since 19 December 2007. Replaced Eduardo Luis Accastello.)	2009
Córdoba	Arturo Miguel Heredia	Front for Victory–PJ	2005	2009
Córdoba	Heriberto Agustín Martínez Oddone	Radical Civic Union	2007	2011
Córdoba	Paula Cecilia Merchán	Popular and Social Encounter	2007	2011
Córdoba	Jorge Luciano Montoya	Front for Victory–PJ	2007	2011
Córdoba	Norma Elena Morandini	Memory and Democracy	2005	2009
Córdoba	Laura Judith Sesma	Socialist Party	2005	2009
Córdoba	Silvia Storni	Radical Civic Union	2007	2011
Córdoba	Patricia Vaca Narvaja	Front for Victory–PJ	2005	2009
Córdoba	Juan Carlos Vega	Civic Coalition–ARI–GEN	2007	2011
Corrientes	José Ameghino Arbo	Liberal Party of Corrientes	2007	2011
Corrientes	María Josefa Areta	Frente de Todos	2007	2011
Corrientes	María Araceli Carmona	Front for Victory–PJ	2005	2009
Corrientes	Eduardo Leonel Galantini	Front for Victory–PJ	2005	2009
Corrientes	Hugo Rubén Perié	Front for Victory–PJ	2007	2011 (Note: Died on 15 August 2011. Replaced by Ana María Perroni.)
Corrientes	Agustín Alberto Portela	Radical Civic Union	2007	2011
Corrientes	José María Roldán	Frente de Todos	2007 (Note: Since 4 December 2007. Replaced Ricardo Colombi.)	2009
Entre Ríos	Nelio Higinio Calza	Front for Victory–PJ	2005	2009
Entre Ríos	María Cristina Cremer de Busti	Front for Victory–PJ	2007	2009 (Note: Resigned on 10 December 2009 from her 2007–2011 mandate in order to assume a 2009–2013 mandate. Replaced by Antonio Aníbal Alizegui.)
Entre Ríos	Gustavo Cusinato	Radical Civic Union	2007	2011
Entre Ríos	Emilio Raúl Martínez Garbino	Concertation	2005	2009
Entre Ríos	María de los Ángeles Petit	Front for Victory–PJ	2007 (Note: Since 10 December 2007. Replaced Blanca Osuna.)	2009
Entre Ríos	Raúl Patricio Solanas	Front for Victory–PJ	2005	2009
Entre Ríos	Sergio Fausto Varisco	Radical Civic Union	2005	2009
Entre Ríos	Lisandro Alfredo Viale	Socialist Party	2007	2011
Entre Ríos	Gustavo Marcelo Zavallo	Front for Victory–PJ	2007	2011
Formosa	María Graciela de la Rosa	Front for Victory–PJ	2007	2011
Formosa	Juan Carlos Díaz Roig	Front for Victory–PJ	2005	2009
Formosa	Luis María Fernández Basualdo	Front for Victory–PJ	2007	2010 (Note: Died on 21 October 2010. Replaced by Carlos Guillermo Donkin.)
Formosa	Rafael Ángel López	Front for Victory–PJ	2007	2011
Formosa	Carmen Román	Front for Victory–PJ	2005	2009
Jujuy	Eduardo Alfredo Fellner	Front for Victory–PJ	2007	2011
Jujuy	Miguel Ángel Giubergia	Radical Civic Union	2007	2011
Jujuy	Mario Humberto Martiarena	Front for Victory–PJ	2007	2011
Jujuy	María Carolina Moisés	Front for Victory–PJ	2005	2009
Jujuy	Alejandro Mario Nieva	Radical Civic Union	2005	2009
Jujuy	Carlos Daniel Snopek	Front for Victory–PJ	2005	2009
La Pampa	Manuel Justo Baladrón	Front for Victory–PJ	2005	2009
La Pampa	Irma Adriana García	Front for Victory–PJ	2007	2011
La Pampa	Eduardo Enrique Federico Kenny	Radical Civic Union	2007	2011
La Pampa	Daniel Ricardo Kroneberger	Radical Civic Union	2005	2009
La Pampa	Marta Lucía Osorio	Front for Victory–PJ	2005	2009
La Rioja	Hilda Clelia Aguirre de Soria	Front for Victory–PJ	2007	2011
La Rioja	Griselda Noemí Herrera	Front for Victory–PJ	2005	2009
La Rioja	Alberto Nicolás Paredes Urquiza	Front for Victory–PJ	2007	2011
La Rioja	Marta Beatriz Quintero	Front for Victory–PJ	2009 (Note: Since 25 November 2009. Replaced Jesús Fernando Rejal.)	2011
La Rioja	Jesús Fernando Rejal	Front for Victory–PJ	2007	2009 (Note: Resigned on 24 November 2009. Replaced by Marta Beatriz Quintero.)
La Rioja	Mario Armando Santander	Front for Victory–PJ	2005	2009
Mendoza	Jorge Luis Albarracín	Concertation	2007 (Note: Since 10 December 2007. Replaced Alfredo Cornejo.)	2009
Mendoza	Héctor Jorge Álvaro	Concertation	2007	2011
Mendoza	Omar Bruno De Marchi	Democratic Party of Mendoza	2005	2009
Mendoza	Patricia Susana Fadel	Front for Victory–PJ	2007	2011
Mendoza	Amanda Susana Genem	Front for Victory–PJ	2005	2009
Mendoza	Juan Dante González	Front for Victory–PJ	2007	2011
Mendoza	Silvia Beatriz Lemos	Radical Civic Union	2005	2009
Mendoza	Laura Gisela Montero	Concertation	2007	2009 (Note: Resigned on 24 November 2009. Replaced by Sergio Damián Pinto.)
Mendoza	Guillermo Antonio Pereyra	Front for Victory–PJ	2007	2011
Mendoza	Sergio Damián Pinto	Radical Civic Union	2009 (Note: Since 25 November 2009. Replaced Laura Montero.)	2011
Mendoza	Enrique Luis Thomas	Front for Victory–PJ	2005	2009
Misiones	Lía Fabiola Bianco	Front for Victory–PJ	2005	2009
Misiones	Juan Manuel Irrazábal	Front for Victory–PJ	2007	2011
Misiones	Miguel Ángel Iturrieta	Front for Victory–PJ	2005	2009
Misiones	Emilio Kakubur	Peronist Dignity	2005	2009
Misiones	Stella Maris Leverberg	Front for Victory–PJ	2007	2011
Misiones	Timoteo Llera	Front for Victory–PJ	2007	2011
Misiones	Julia Argentina Perié	Front for Victory–PJ	2007	2011
Neuquén	Hugo Rodolfo Acuña	Neuquén People's Movement	2005	2009
Neuquén	José Ricardo Brillo	Neuquén People's Movement	2005	2009
Neuquén	Alicia Marcela Comelli	Neuquén People's Movement	2007	2011
Neuquén	Oscar Ermelindo Massei	Front for Victory–PJ	2005	2009
Neuquén	Hugo Nelson Prieto	Concertation	2007	2011
Río Negro	Julio Esteban Arriaga	Front for Victory–PJ	2005	2009
Río Negro	Jorge Alberto Cejas	Front for Victory–PJ	2007	2011
Río Negro	Hugo Oscar Cuevas	Concertation	2005	2009
Río Negro	Cipriana Lorena Rossi	Front for Victory–PJ	2007	2011
Río Negro	Juan Carlos Scalesi	Concertation	2007	2011
Salta	Susana Mercedes Canela	Front for Victory–PJ	2005	2009
Salta	Zulema Beatriz Daher	Front for Victory–PJ	2007	2011
Salta	María Inés Diez	Salta Renewal Party	2007 (Note: Since 4 December 2007. Replaced Andrés Zottos.)	2009
Salta	Marcelo Eduardo López Arias	Front for Victory–PJ	2007	2011
Salta	Osvaldo Rubén Salum	Front for Victory–PJ	2005	2009
Salta	Mónica Liliana Torfe	Salta Renewal Party	2007	2011
Salta	José Antonio Vilariño	Front for Victory–PJ	2007	2011
San Juan	Graciela María Caselles	Front for Victory–PJ	2007	2011
San Juan	Margarita Ferrá de Bartol	Front for Victory–PJ	2005	2009
San Juan	Juan Carlos Gioja	Front for Victory–PJ	2007	2011
San Juan	Ruperto Eduardo Godoy	Front for Victory–PJ	2007	2011
San Juan	Ernesto Segundo López	Front for Victory–PJ	2007 (Note: Since 10 December 2007. Replaced José Rubén Uñac.)	2009
San Juan	Adriana del Carmen Marino	Production and Labour	2005	2009
San Luis	Ivana María Bianchi	Justice, Unity and Liberty Front	2007	2011
San Luis	Luis Bernardo Lusquiños	Justice, Unity and Liberty Front	2005	2009
San Luis	Mario Raúl Merlo	Justice, Unity and Liberty Front	2007	2011
San Luis	Claudio Javier Poggi	Justice, Unity and Liberty Front	2005	2009
San Luis	María Angélica Torrontegui	Justice, Unity and Liberty Front	2005	2009
Santa Cruz	Juan Erwin Bolívar Acuña Kunz	Radical Civic Union	2005	2009
Santa Cruz	José Manuel Córdoba	Front for Victory–PJ	2005	2009
Santa Cruz	Graciela Beatriz Gutiérrez	Front for Victory–PJ	2005	2009
Santa Cruz	Beatriz Liliana Korenfeld	Front for Victory–PJ	2007	2011
Santa Cruz	Evaristo Arturo Rodríguez	Front for Victory–PJ	2007	2011
Santa Fe	Walter Alfredo Agosto	Front for Victory–PJ	2007	2011
Santa Fe	Silvia Augsburger	Socialist Party	2005	2009
Santa Fe	Miguel Ángel Barrios	Socialist Party	2007	2011
Santa Fe	Verónica Claudia Benas	Solidarity and Equality–ARI TDF	2007	2011
Santa Fe	Ana Berraute	Front for Victory–PJ	2005	2009
Santa Fe	Ariel Raúl Armando Dalla Fontana	Front for Victory–PJ	2005	2009
Santa Fe	Mónica Haydée Fein	Socialist Party	2007	2011
Santa Fe	Paulina Esther Fiol	Front for Victory–PJ	2007	2011
Santa Fe	Susana Rosa García	Civic Coalition–ARI–GEN	2007	2011
Santa Fe	Elda Ramona Gerez	Socialist Party	2007 (Note: Since 19 December 2007. Replaced Hermes Binner.)	2009
Santa Fe	Gustavo Ángel Marconato	Front for Victory–PJ	2007	2011
Santa Fe	María Elena Martin	Socialist Party	2007 (Note: Since 19 December 2007. Replaced Hugo Guillermo Storero.)	2009
Santa Fe	Pedro Juan Morini	Radical Civic Union	2005	2009
Santa Fe	Jorge Alberto Obeid	Front for Victory–PJ	2007	2011
Santa Fe	Fabián Francisco Peralta	Civic Coalition–ARI–GEN	2007	2011
Santa Fe	Agustín Oscar Rossi	Front for Victory–PJ	2005	2009
Santa Fe	Alejandro Luis Rossi	Front for Victory–PJ	2007	2011
Santa Fe	Juan Héctor Sylvestre Begnis	Front for Victory–PJ	2005	2009
Santa Fe	Pablo Ventura Zancada	Socialist Party	2005	2009
Santiago del Estero	Daniel Agustín Brue	Civic Front for Santiago	2005	2009
Santiago del Estero	José Alberto Herrera	Civic Front for Santiago	2007	2011
Santiago del Estero	Ana Zulema Luna de Marcos	Civic Front for Santiago	2007	2011
Santiago del Estero	Cristian Rodolfo Oliva	Civic Front for Santiago	2005	2009
Santiago del Estero	Mirta Ameliana Pastoriza	Civic Front for Santiago	2007	2011
Santiago del Estero	Jorge Raúl Pérez	Civic Front for Santiago	2007	2011
Santiago del Estero	Marta Sylvia Velarde	Front for Victory–PJ	2005	2009
Tierra del Fuego	Nélida Belous	Solidarity and Equality–ARI TDF	2007	2011
Tierra del Fuego	Rosana Andrea Bertone	Front for Victory–PJ	2005	2009
Tierra del Fuego	Mariel Calchaquí	Front for Victory–PJ	2007	2011
Tierra del Fuego	Leonardo Ariel Gorbacz	Solidarity and Equality–ARI TDF	2005	2009
Tierra del Fuego	Rubén Darío Sciutto	Front for Victory–PJ	2007	2011
Tucumán	Germán Enrique Alfaro	Front for Victory–PJ	2007	2011
Tucumán	Norah Susana Castaldo	Radical Civic Union	2009 (Note: Since 9 August 2009. Replaced José Ignacio García Hamilton.)	2011
Tucumán	Stella Maris Córdoba	Front for Victory–PJ	2005	2009
Tucumán	Alfredo Carlos Dato	Front for Victory–PJ	2007	2011
Tucumán	Susana Eladia Díaz	Front for Victory–PJ	2007	2011
Tucumán	José Ignacio García Hamilton	Radical Civic Union	2007	2009 (Note: Died on 17 June 2009. Replaced by Norah Susana Castaldo.)
Tucumán	Alberto Herrera	Front for Victory–PJ	2005	2009
Tucumán	Beatriz Liliana Rojkés de Alperovich	Front for Victory–PJ	2005	2009
Tucumán	Juan Arturo Salim	Front for Victory–PJ	2005	2009
Tucumán	Gerónimo Vargas Aignasse	Front for Victory–PJ	2007	2011
