= List of Argentine deputies, 2005–2007 =

This is list of members of the Argentine Chamber of Deputies from 10 December 2005 to 9 December 2007.

== Composition ==
=== By province ===
Province	Deputies	Population (2010)
Buenos Aires	70	15,625,084
Buenos Aires City	25	2,890,151
Catamarca	5	367,828
Chaco	7	1,053,466
Chubut	5	506,668
Córdoba	18	3,304,825
Corrientes	7	993,338
Entre Ríos	9	1,236,300
Formosa	5	527,895
Jujuy	6	672,260
La Pampa	5	316,940
La Rioja	5	331,847
Mendoza	10	1,741,610
Misiones	7	1,097,829
Neuquén	5	550,334
Río Negro	5	633,374
Salta	7	1,215,207
San Juan	6	680,427
San Luis	5	431,588
Santa Cruz	5	272,524
Santa Fe	19	3,200,736
Santiago del Estero	7	896,461
Tierra del Fuego	5	126,190
Tucumán	9	1,448,200

=== By political groups ===
as of 9 December 2007

Bloc	Seats	Leader
Front for Victory–PJ	113	Agustín Rossi
Radical Civic Union	36	Fernando Gustavo Chironi
Federal Peronist	19	José María Díaz Bancalari
ARI	14	Eduardo Macaluse
National Justicialist	11	Jorge Sarghini
PRO	11	Jorge Vanossi
New Party	5	Raúl Merino
Socialist Party	5	Silvia Augsburger
Neuquén People's Movement	4	Alberto César Pérez
People's Movement Front	4	Luis Lusquiños
Federalist Unity	3	Nélida Mabel Mansur
Republican Force	2	Roberto Ignacio Lix Klett
Salta Renewal Party	2	María Inés Diez
Entre Ríos Concertation	2	Juan Carlos Lucio Godoy
Bonaerense People's Front	2	Hugo Alberto Franco
Civic and Social Front	2	Genaro Aurelio Collantes
Civic Front for Santiago	2	Daniel Agustín Brue
Single-member blocs	20	—N/a
Source: hcdn.gov.ar (archived)

== Election cycles ==
Election	Term	
Election	Start	End
2003	10 December 2003	9 December 2007
2005	10 December 2005	9 December 2009

== List of deputies ==
Province	Deputy	Party	Term	
Province	Deputy	Party	From	To
Buenos Aires	Elda Susana Agüero	Front for Victory–PJ	2003	2007
Buenos Aires	Guillermo Eduardo Alchouron	Action for the Republic	2003	2007
Buenos Aires	Juan José Álvarez	National Justicialist	2003	2007
Buenos Aires	María Cristina Álvarez Rodríguez	Front for Victory–PJ	2005	2009
Buenos Aires	Isabel Amanda Artola	Front for Victory–PJ	2003	2007
Buenos Aires	Alfredo Néstor Atanasof	Federal Peronist	2003	2007
Buenos Aires	Pedro José Azcoiti	Radical Civic Union	2005	2009
Buenos Aires	Alberto Edgardo Balestrini	Front for Victory–PJ	2005	2007 (Note: Resigned on 10 December 2007 to take office as Vice Governor of Buenos Aires Province.)
Buenos Aires	Vilma Rosana Baragiola	Radical Civic Union	2005	2009
Buenos Aires	Claudia Alicia Bernazza	Front for Victory–PJ	2007 (Note: Since 19 September 2007. Replaced Graciela Rosso.)	2009
Buenos Aires	Marcela Alejandra Bianchi Silvestre	Front for Victory–PJ	2005	2009
Buenos Aires	Juan Carlos Bonacorsi	Federalist Unity Party	2003	2007
Buenos Aires	Eugenio Burzaco	PRO	2005	2009
Buenos Aires	Dante Alberto Camaño	National Syndicalist	2005	2009
Buenos Aires	Graciela Camaño	Federal Peronist	2005	2009
Buenos Aires	Eduardo Oscar Camaño	National Justicialist	2003	2007
Buenos Aires	Remo Gerardo Carlotto	Front for Victory–PJ	2005	2009
Buenos Aires	Lilia Estrella Marina Cassese	National Justicialist	2004 (Note: Since 2 March 2004. Replaced José Antonio Pampuro.)	2007
Buenos Aires	Nora Noemí César	Front for Victory–PJ	2005	2009
Buenos Aires	Nora Alicia Chiacchio	Federal Peronist	2003	2007
Buenos Aires	Luis Francisco Jorge Cicogna	Front for Victory–PJ	2005	2009
Buenos Aires	Adriana Elsa Coirini	Federal Peronist	2005 (Note: Since 14 December 2005. Replaced Hilda González de Duhalde.)	2007
Buenos Aires	Diana Beatriz Conti	Front for Victory–PJ	2005	2009
Buenos Aires	Roberto Raúl Costa	Radical Civic Union	2003	2007
Buenos Aires	Francisco de Narváez	National Justicialist	2005	2009
Buenos Aires	Carlos Francisco Dellepiane	Bonaerense People's Front	2003	2007
Buenos Aires	Edgardo Fernando Depetri	Front for Victory–PJ	2005	2009
Buenos Aires	Oscar Jorge Di Landro	Federal Peronist	2003	2007
Buenos Aires	Juliana Di Tullio	Front for Victory–PJ	2005	2009
Buenos Aires	José María Díaz Bancalari	Federal Peronist	2003	2007
Buenos Aires	María Nélida Doga	National Justicialist	2003	2007
Buenos Aires	Miguel Dante Dovena	Front for Victory–PJ	2005	2009
Buenos Aires	Gustavo Enrique Ferri	National Justicialist	2003	2007
Buenos Aires	Francisco José Ferro	Radical Civic Union	2005	2009
Buenos Aires	Hugo Alberto Franco	Bonaerense People's Front	2003	2007
Buenos Aires	María Teresa García	Front for Victory–PJ	2005	2009
Buenos Aires	Jorge Antonio Garrido Arceo	Front for Victory–PJ	2003	2007
Buenos Aires	Francisco Virgilio Gutiérrez	Front for Victory–PJ	2005	2009
Buenos Aires	Luis Alfredo Ilarregui	Front for Victory–PJ	2005	2009
Buenos Aires	Ricardo Javier Jano	Radical Civic Union	2003	2007
Buenos Aires	Carlos Miguel Kunkel	Front for Victory–PJ	2005	2009
Buenos Aires	Jorge Alberto Landau	Federal Peronist	2003	2007
Buenos Aires	Eduardo Gabriel Macaluse	ARI	2003	2007
Buenos Aires	Marta Olinda Maffei	ARI	2003	2007
Buenos Aires	Nélida Mabel Mansur	Federalist Unity Party	2003	2007
Buenos Aires	Carlos Julio Moreno	Front for Victory–PJ	2005	2009
Buenos Aires	Mabel Hilda Müller	Federal Peronist	2005	2009
Buenos Aires	Lidia Lucía Naim	ARI	2006 (Note: Since 6 September 2006. Replaced Elsa Siria Quiroz in her 2005–2009 mandate.)	2009
Buenos Aires	Patricia Ester Panzoni	Radical Civic Union	2003	2007
Buenos Aires	José Adrián Pérez	ARI	2003	2007
Buenos Aires	Mirta Susana Pérez	Federal Peronist	2003	2007
Buenos Aires	Héctor Norberto Porto	Federal Peronist	2005	2009
Buenos Aires	Elsa Siria Quiroz	ARI	2006 (Note: Resigned on 5 September 2006 from her 2005–2009 mandate to replace Graciela Ocaña (2003–2007 mandate). Replaced by Lidia Lucía Naim.)	2007
Buenos Aires	Carlos Alberto Raimundi	ARI	2005	2009
Buenos Aires	Héctor Pedro Recalde	Front for Victory–PJ	2005	2009
Buenos Aires	María del Carmen Cecilia Rico	Federal Peronist	2005	2009
Buenos Aires	Oscar Ernesto Ronaldo Rodríguez	Federal Peronist	2003	2007
Buenos Aires	Marcela Virginia Rodríguez	ARI	2005	2009
Buenos Aires	Graciela Zulema Rosso	Front for Victory–PJ	2005	2007 (Note: Resigned on 19 September 2007. Replaced by Claudia Bernazza.)
Buenos Aires	Carlos Federico Ruckauf	Federal Peronist	2003	2007
Buenos Aires	Jorge Emilio Sarghini	National Justicialist	2005	2009
Buenos Aires	Juan Carlos Sluga	Front for Victory–PJ	2003	2007
Buenos Aires	Paola Susana Spatola	Peronist Guard	2005	2009
Buenos Aires	Aníbal Jesús Stella	Federal Peronist	2004 (Note: Since 11 August 2004. Replaced María del Carmen Falbo.)	2007
Buenos Aires	Federico Teobaldo Manuel Storani	Radical Civic Union	2003	2007
Buenos Aires	Hugo David Toledo	Federal Peronist	2003	2007
Buenos Aires	Adriana Elisa Tomaz	Federalist Unity Party	2005	2009
Buenos Aires	Pablo Tonelli	PRO	2005	2009
Buenos Aires	Rosa Ester Tulio	Federal Peronist	2003	2007
Buenos Aires	Jorge Antonio Villaverde	Federal Peronist	2005	2009
Buenos Aires	Mariano Federico West	Front for Victory–PJ	2005	2009
Buenos Aires City	Jorge Martín Arturo Argüello	Front for Victory–PJ	2003	2007 (Note: Resigned on 4 May 2007 to take office as permanent representative to the United Nations. Replaced by Rafael Martínez Raymonda.)
Buenos Aires City	Paula María Bertol	PRO	2005	2009
Buenos Aires City	Rafael Antonio Bielsa	Front for Victory–PJ	2005	2007 (Note: Resigned on 6 November 2007. Replaced by Claudio Marcelo Morgado.)
Buenos Aires City	Delia Beatriz Bisutti	ARI	2005	2009
Buenos Aires City	Miguel Luis Bonasso	Convergence	2003	2007
Buenos Aires City	Esteban José Bullrich	PRO	2005	2009
Buenos Aires City	Jorge Edmundo Coscia	Front for Victory–PJ	2005	2009
Buenos Aires City	Marta Susana De Brasi	Front for Victory–PJ	2003	2007
Buenos Aires City	Luis Alberto Galvalisi	PRO	2005	2009
Buenos Aires City	Emilio Arturo García Méndez	ARI	2005	2009
Buenos Aires City	Nora Raquel Ginzburg	PRO	2005	2009
Buenos Aires City	Silvana Myriam Giudici	Radical Civic Union	2003	2007
Buenos Aires City	María América González	ARI	2005	2009
Buenos Aires City	Eduardo Lorenzo Borocotó	Independent Movement	2005	2009
Buenos Aires City	Claudio Raúl Lozano	Emancipation and Justice	2003	2007
Buenos Aires City	Mauricio Macri	PRO	2005	2007 (Note: Resigned on 10 December 2007 to take office as Chief of Government of Buenos Aires. Replaced by Julián Obiglio.)
Buenos Aires City	Mercedes Marcó del Pont	Front for Victory–PJ	2005	2009
Buenos Aires City	Juliana Isabel Marino	Front for Victory–PJ	2003	2007
Buenos Aires City	Rafael Martínez Raymonda	Independent	(Note: Since 6 June 2007. Replaced Jorge Argüello.)	2007
Buenos Aires City	Hugo Martini	PRO	2003	2007
Buenos Aires City	Lucrecia Etelvina Monti	National Justicialist	2003	2007
Buenos Aires City	Claudio Marcelo Morgado	Front for Victory–PJ	2007 (Note: Since 7 November 2007. Replaced Rafael Bielsa.)	2009
Buenos Aires City	Federico Pinedo	PRO	2003	2007
Buenos Aires City	Cristian Adrián Ritondo	Peronist Proposal	2003	2007
Buenos Aires City	Fernando Sánchez	ARI	2005	2009
Buenos Aires City	Carlos Alberto Tinnirello	Social Encounter Network	2003	2007
Buenos Aires City	Jorge Reinaldo Vanossi	PRO	2003	2007
Catamarca	José Luis Barrionuevo	Federal Peronist	2005	2009
Catamarca	Genaro Aurelio Collantes	Civic and Social Front of Catamarca	2005	2009
Catamarca	Guillermo de la Barrera	Front for Victory–PJ	2003	2007
Catamarca	Lucía Garín de Tula	Civic and Social Front of Catamarca	2003	2007
Catamarca	Eduardo Antonio Pastoriza	For Truth	2005	2009
Chaco	Liliana Amelia Bayonzo	Radical Civic Union	2005	2009
Chaco	Margarita Beatriz Beveraggi	Radical Civic Union	2007 (Note: Since 8 August 2007. Replaced Ángel Rozas.)	2009
Chaco	Luciano Rafael Fabris	Radical Civic Union	2005	2009
Chaco	José Ricardo Mongelo	Front for Victory–PJ	2003	2007
Chaco	Olinda Montenegro	Radical Civic Union	2003	2007
Chaco	Ángel Rozas	Radical Civic Union	2005	2007 (Note: Until 8 August 2007. Replaced by Margarita Beatriz Beveraggi.)
Chaco	Gladys Beatriz Soto	Front for Victory–PJ	2005	2009
Chaco	Víctor Zimmermann	Radical Civic Union	2003	2007
Chubut	Fortunato Rafael Cambareri	Radical Civic Union	2003	2007
Chubut	Eduardo de Bernardi	Front for Victory–PJ	2003	2007
Chubut	Eva García de Moreno	Front for Victory–PJ	2005	2009
Chubut	Nancy Susana González	Front for Victory–PJ	2006 (Note: Since 11 October 2006. Replaced Aldo Marconetto.)	2009
Chubut	Roddy Ernesto Ingram	Front for Victory–PJ	2003	2007
Chubut	Aldo Juan Marconetto	Front for Victory–PJ	2005	2006 (Note: Until 11 October 2006. Replaced by Nancy González.)
Córdoba	Eduardo Luis Accastello	Front for Victory–PJ	2005	2007 (Note: Resigned on 10 December 2007. Replaced by Beatriz Susana Halak.)
Córdoba	Oscar Raúl Aguad	Radical Civic Union	2005	2009
Córdoba	Gumersindo Federico Alonso	New Party	2003	2007
Córdoba	Mario Rolando Ardid	New Party	2005	2009
Córdoba	Alberto Cantero Gutiérrez	Front for Victory–PJ	2005	2009
Córdoba	Carlos Alberto Caserio	Front for Victory–PJ	2003	2007
Córdoba	Stella Maris Cittadini de Montes	Front for Victory–PJ	2003	2007
Córdoba	Francisco José Delich	New Party	2005	2009
Córdoba	Arturo Miguel Heredia	Front for Victory–PJ	2005	2009
Córdoba	Beatriz Mercedes Leyba de Martí	Radical Civic Union	2003	2007
Córdoba	Amelia de los Milagros López	Front for Victory–PJ	2006 (Note: Since 4 May 2006. Replaced Jorge Luciano Montoya.)	2007
Córdoba	Raúl Guillermo Merino	New Party	2003	2007
Córdoba	Ana María Carmen Monayar	Front for Victory–PJ	2003	2007
Córdoba	Jorge Luciano Montoya	Front for Victory–PJ	2003	2006 (Note: Resigned on 29 March 2006. Replaced by Amelia de los Milagros López.)
Córdoba	Norma Elena Morandini	New Party	2005	2009
Córdoba	Mario Raúl Negri	Radical Civic Union	2003	2007
Córdoba	Ana Elisa Rita Richter	Front for Victory–PJ	2003	2007
Córdoba	Laura Judith Sesma	Socialist Party	2005	2009
Córdoba	Patricia Vaca Narvaja	Front for Victory–PJ	2005	2009
Corrientes	Gustavo Jesús Adolfo Canteros	Corrientes Project	2003	2007 (Note: Until 28 November 2007. Replaced by Pedro Ademar Vera.)
Corrientes	María Araceli Carmona	Front for Victory–PJ	2005	2009
Corrientes	Horacio Ricardo Colombi	Front for All	2005	2007 (Note: Until 28 November 2007. Replaced by José María Roldán.)
Corrientes	Eduardo Leonel Galantini	Front for Victory–PJ	2005	2009
Corrientes	Carlos Guillermo Macchi	PANU	2003	2007
Corrientes	Araceli Estela Méndez de Ferreyra	Front for Victory–PJ	2003	2007
Corrientes	Hugo Rubén Perié	Front for Victory–PJ	2003	2007
Corrientes	Pedro Ademar Ramón Vera	Corrientes Project	2007 (Note: Since 4 December 2007. Replaced Gustavo Canteros.)	2007
Entre Ríos	Carlos Jaime Cecco	Radical Civic Union	2003	2007
Entre Ríos	Jorge Carlos Daud	Front for Victory–PJ	2003	2007
Entre Ríos	Juan Carlos Lucio Godoy	Entre Ríos Concertation	2003	2007
Entre Ríos	José Eduardo Lauritto	Front for Victory–PJ	2005	2009
Entre Ríos	Emilio Raúl Martínez Garbino	Entre Ríos Concertation	2005	2009
Entre Ríos	Blanca Inés Osuna	Front for Victory–PJ	2005	2007 (Note: Resigned on 10 December 2007 to take office as National Senator. Replaced by María de los Ángeles Petit.)
Entre Ríos	Rosario Margarita Romero	Front for Victory–PJ	2003	2007
Entre Ríos	Raúl Patricio Solanas	Front for Victory–PJ	2005	2009
Entre Ríos	Sergio Fausto Varisco	Radical Civic Union	2005	2009
Formosa	Mario Fernando Bejarano	Front for Victory–PJ	2003	2007
Formosa	María Graciela de la Rosa	Front for Victory–PJ	2003	2007
Formosa	Juan Carlos Díaz Roig	Front for Victory–PJ	2005	2009
Formosa	Carmen Román	Front for Victory–PJ	2005	2009
Formosa	Rodolfo Roquel	Front for Victory–PJ	2003	2007
Jujuy	Eduardo Víctor Cavadini	Front for Victory–PJ	2005 (Note: Since 14 December 2005. Replaced Liliana Fellner.)	2007
Jujuy	Héctor Rubén Daza	Front for Victory–PJ	2003	2007
Jujuy	Miguel Ángel Giubergia	Radical Civic Union	2003	2007
Jujuy	María Carolina Moisés	Front for Victory–PJ	2005	2009
Jujuy	Alejandro Mario Nieva	Radical Civic Union	2005	2009
Jujuy	Carlos Daniel Snopek	Front for Victory–PJ	2005	2009
La Pampa	Manuel Justo Baladrón	Front for Victory–PJ	2005	2009
La Pampa	Santiago Ferrigno	Front for Victory–PJ	2003	2007
La Pampa	Daniel Ricardo Kroneberger	Radical Civic Union	2005	2009
La Pampa	Heriberto Eloy Mediza	Front for Victory–PJ	2003	2007
La Pampa	Marta Lucía Osorio	Front for Victory–PJ	2005	2009
La Rioja	Griselda Noemí Herrera	Front for Victory–PJ	2005	2009
La Rioja	Julio César Martínez	Radical Civic Union	2003	2007
La Rioja	Adrián Menem	National Justicialist	2003	2007
La Rioja	Alejandra Beatriz Oviedo	National Justicialist	2003	2007
La Rioja	Mario Armando Santander	Federal Peronist	2005	2009
Mendoza	Josefina Abdala	Radical Civic Union	2003	2007
Mendoza	Luis Gustavo Borsani	Radical Civic Union	2003	2007
Mendoza	Alfredo Víctor Cornejo	Radical Civic Union	2005	2007 (Note: Resigned on 10 December 2007 to take office as Mayor of Godoy Cruz. Replaced by Jorge Luis Albarracín.)
Mendoza	Omar Bruno De Marchi	Democratic Party of Mendoza	2005	2009
Mendoza	Patricia Susana Fadel	Front for Victory–PJ	2003	2007
Mendoza	Alfredo César Fernández	Front for Victory–PJ	2003	2007
Mendoza	Amanda Susana Genem	Front for Victory–PJ	2005	2009
Mendoza	Roberto Raúl Iglesias	Radical Civic Union	2003	2007
Mendoza	Silvia Beatriz Lemos	Radical Civic Union	2005	2009
Mendoza	Enrique Thomas	Front for Victory–PJ	2005	2009
Misiones	Lía Fabiola Bianco	Front for Victory–PJ	2005	2009
Misiones	Irene Miriam Bosch de Sartori	Front for Victory–PJ	2003	2007
Misiones	Juan Manuel Irrazábal	Front for Victory–PJ	2003	2007
Misiones	Miguel Ángel Iturrieta	Front for Victory–PJ	2005	2009
Misiones	Emilio Kakubur	Front for Victory–PJ	2005	2009
Misiones	Stella Marys Peso	National Justicialist	2003	2007
Misiones	Diego Horacio Sartori	Front for Victory–PJ	2003	2007
Neuquén	Hugo Rodolfo Acuña	Neuquén People's Movement	2005	2009
Neuquén	José Ricardo Brillo	Neuquén People's Movement	2005	2009
Neuquén	Alicia Marcela Comelli	Neuquén People's Movement	2003	2007
Neuquén	Oscar Ermelindo Massei	Front for Victory–PJ	2005	2009
Neuquén	Alberto César Pérez	Neuquén People's Movement	2003	2007
Río Negro	Julio Esteban Arriaga	Front for Victory–PJ	2005	2009
Río Negro	Fernando Gustavo Chironi	Radical Civic Union	2003	2007
Río Negro	Hugo Oscar Cuevas	Radical Civic Union	2005	2009
Río Negro	Cynthia Gabriela Hernández	Radical Civic Union	2003	2007
Río Negro	Osvaldo Mario Nemirovsci	Front for Victory–PJ	2003	2007
Salta	Susana Mercedes Canela	Front for Victory–PJ	2005	2009
Salta	Zulema Beatriz Daher	Front for Victory–PJ	2003	2007
Salta	María Inés Diez	Salta Renewal Party	2007 (Note: Since 4 December 2007. Replaced Andrés Zottos.)	2009
Salta	Antonio Lovaglio Saravia	Front for Victory–PJ	2003	2007
Salta	Osvaldo Rubén Salum	Front for Victory–PJ	2005	2009
Salta	Carlos Alberto Sosa	Salta Renewal Party	2003	2007
Salta	Juan Manuel Urtubey	Front for Victory–PJ	2003	2007
Salta	Andrés Zottos	Salta Renewal Party	2005	2007 (Note: Resigned on 4 December 2007 to take office as Vice Governor of Salta. Replaced by María Inés Diez)
San Juan	Guillermo Francisco Baigorri	Life and Commitment	2003	2007
San Juan	Dante Raúl Elizondo	Front for Victory–PJ	2005	2006 (Note: Resigned on 10 May 2006. Replaced by José Rubén Uñac.)
San Juan	Margarita Ferrá de Bartol	Front for Victory–PJ	2005	2009
San Juan	Juan Carlos Gioja	Front for Victory–PJ	2003	2007
San Juan	Ruperto Eduardo Godoy	Front for Victory–PJ	2003	2007
San Juan	Adriana del Carmen Marino	Production and Labour	2005	2009
San Juan	José Rubén Uñac	Front for Victory–PJ	2006 (Note: Since 10 May 2006. Replaced Dante Elizondo.)	2007 (Note: Resigned on 9 December 2007 to take office as Vice Governor of San Juan. Replaced by Ernesto Segundo López.)
San Luis	Ivana María Bianchi	People's Movement Front	2007 (Note: Since 15 August 2007. Replaced Alicia Lemme.)	2007
San Luis	María Alicia Lemme	People's Movement Front	2003	2007 (Note: Resigned on 15 August 2007. Replaced by Ivana María Bianchi.)
San Luis	Luis Bernardo Lusquiños	People's Movement Front	2005	2009
San Luis	Claudio Javier Poggi	People's Movement Front	2005	2009
San Luis	Héctor Omar Torino	Front for Victory–PJ	2005 (Note: Since 14 December 2005. Replaced Adolfo Rodríguez Saá.)	2007
San Luis	María Angélica Torrontegui	People's Movement Front	2005	2009
Santa Cruz	Juan Erwin Bolívar Acuña Kunz	Radical Civic Union	2005	2009
Santa Cruz	Eduardo Ariel Arnold	Independent	2003	2007
Santa Cruz	Dante Omar Canevarolo	Front for Victory–PJ	2006 (Note: Since 29 March 2006. Replaced Silvia Graciela Esteban.)	2007
Santa Cruz	José Manuel Córdoba	Front for Victory–PJ	2005	2009
Santa Cruz	Silvia Graciela Esteban	Front for Victory–PJ	2003	2006 (Note: Resigned on 29 March 2006. Replaced by Dante Omar Canevarolo.)
Santa Cruz	Graciela Beatriz Gutiérrez	Front for Victory–PJ	2005	2009
Santa Fe	María del Carmen Alarcón	Southern Pampa Movement	2003	2007
Santa Fe	Silvia Augsburger	Socialist Party	2005	2009
Santa Fe	Alberto Juan Beccani	Radical Civic Union	2003	2007
Santa Fe	Ana Berrauti	Front for Victory–PJ	2005	2009
Santa Fe	Hermes Juan Binner	Socialist Party	2005	2007 (Note: Resigned on 10 December 2007 to take office as Governor of Santa Fe. Replaced by Elda Ramona Gerez.)
Santa Fe	Ariel Raúl Armando Dalla Fontana	Front for Victory–PJ	2005	2009
Santa Fe	Eduardo Alfredo Di Pollina	Socialist Party	2003	2007
Santa Fe	Paulina Esther Fiol	Front for Victory–PJ	2003	2007
Santa Fe	Susana Rosa García	ARI	2003	2007
Santa Fe	Jorge Raúl Giorgetti	Front for Victory–PJ	2003	2007
Santa Fe	Jorge Pedro González	Front for Victory–PJ	2003	2007
Santa Fe	Oscar Santiago Lamberto	Front for Victory–PJ	2003	2007
Santa Fe	Gustavo Ángel Marconato	Front for Victory–PJ	2003	2007
Santa Fe	Pedro Juan Morini	Radical Civic Union	2005	2009
Santa Fe	Agustín Oscar Rossi	Front for Victory–PJ	2005	2009
Santa Fe	Hugo Guillermo Storero	Radical Civic Union	2005	2007 (Note: Resigned on 10 December 2007. Replaced by María Elena Martin.)
Santa Fe	Juan Héctor Sylvestre Begnis	Front for Victory–PJ	2005	2009
Santa Fe	Alicia Ester Tate	Radical Civic Union	2003	2007
Santa Fe	Pablo Ventura Zancada	Socialist Party	2005	2009
Santiago del Estero	Carlos Alfredo Anauate	Independent	2007 (Note: Since 6 June 2007. Replaced Fernando Omar Salim.)	2007
Santiago del Estero	Daniel Agustín Brue	Civic Front for Santiago	2005	2009
Santiago del Estero	José María Cantos	Front for Victory–PJ	2003	2007
Santiago del Estero	José Oscar Figueroa	Front for Victory–PJ	2003	2007
Santiago del Estero	Cristian Rodolfo Oliva	Civic Front for Santiago	2005	2009
Santiago del Estero	Graciela Hortencia Olmos	Front for Victory–PJ	2003	2007
Santiago del Estero	Fernando Omar Salim	Front for Victory–PJ	2003	2006 (Note: Resigned on 2 November 2006. Replaced by Carlos Alfredo Anauate.)
Santiago del Estero	Marta Sylvia Velarde	Front for Victory–PJ	2005	2009
Tierra del Fuego	Rosana Andrea Bertone	Front for Victory–PJ	2005	2009
Tierra del Fuego	Daniel Oscar Gallo	Front for Victory–PJ	2003	2007
Tierra del Fuego	Leonardo Ariel Gorbacz	ARI	2005	2009
Tierra del Fuego	María Fabiana Ríos	ARI	2003	2007
Tierra del Fuego	Ricardo Alberto Wilder	Provincial Unity Front	2003	2007
Tucumán	Susana Eladia Díaz	Front for Victory–PJ	2003	2007
Tucumán	Alberto Herrera	Front for Victory–PJ	2005	2009
Tucumán	Esteban Eduardo Jerez	PRO	2003	2007
Tucumán	Eusebia Antonia Jerez	Republican Force	2003	2007
Tucumán	Roberto Ignacio Lix Klett	Republican Force	2003	2007
Tucumán	Beatriz Liliana Rojkés de Alperovich	Front for Victory–PJ	2005	2009
Tucumán	Juan Arturo Salim	Front for Victory–PJ	2005	2009
Tucumán	Gerónimo Vargas Aignasse	Front for Victory–PJ	2003	2007
