= List of Argentine deputies, 2009–2011 =

This is list of members of the Argentine Chamber of Deputies from 10 December 2009 to 9 December 2011.

== Composition ==
=== By province ===
Province	Deputies	Population (2010)
Buenos Aires	70	15,625,084
Buenos Aires City	25	2,890,151
Catamarca	5	367,828
Chaco	7	1,053,466
Chubut	5	506,668
Córdoba	18	3,304,825
Corrientes	7	993,338
Entre Ríos	9	1,236,300
Formosa	5	527,895
Jujuy	6	672,260
La Pampa	5	316,940
La Rioja	5	331,847
Mendoza	10	1,741,610
Misiones	7	1,097,829
Neuquén	5	550,334
Río Negro	5	633,374
Salta	7	1,215,207
San Juan	6	680,427
San Luis	5	431,588
Santa Cruz	5	272,524
Santa Fe	19	3,200,736
Santiago del Estero	7	896,461
Tierra del Fuego	5	126,190
Tucumán	9	1,448,200

=== By political groups ===
as of 9 December 2011

Bloc	Seats	Leader
Front for Victory–PJ	87	Agustín Rossi
Radical Civic Union	43	Ricardo Gil Lavedra
Federal Peronism	22	Claudia Rucci
Civic Coalition	18	Elisa Carrió
PRO	11	Federico Pinedo
Civic Front for Santiago	7	Daniel Agustín Brue
Socialist Party	6	Lisandro Alfredo Viale
Peronist Union	6	Felipe Solá
New Encounter	5	Martín Sabbatella
GEN	5	Margarita Stolbizer
Popular Unity	5	Eduardo Macaluse
Peronist	4	Marcelo Eduardo López Arias
Civic Front of Córdoba	3	Ernesto Félix Martínez
Neuquén People's Movement	3	Alicia Marcela Comelli
Project South Movement	3	Pino Solanas
Peronist Unity Core	3	Juan José Álvarez
Concertation	2	Hugo Nelson Prieto
Federal Current of Thought	2	Julio Rubén Ledesma
La Pampa Justicialist Party	2	Roberto Ricardo Robledo
Freemen of the South Movement	2	Victoria Donda
Federal Córdoba	2	Francisco José Fortuna
Single-member blocs	16	—N/a
Source: hcdn.gov.ar (archived)

== Election cycles ==
Election	Term	
Election	Start	End
2007	10 December 2007	9 December 2011
2009	10 December 2009	9 December 2013

== List of deputies ==
Province	Deputy	Party	Term	
Province	Deputy	Party	From	To
Buenos Aires	Horacio Alberto Alcuaz	GEN	2007	2011
Buenos Aires	Ricardo Luis Alfonsín	Radical Civic Union	2009	2013
Buenos Aires	Juan José Álvarez	Peronist Unity Core	2007	2011
Buenos Aires	Eduardo Pablo Amadeo	Federal Peronism	2009	2013
Buenos Aires	Octavio Argüello	Front for Victory–PJ	2007	2011
Buenos Aires	Alfredo Néstor Atanasof	Federal Peronism	2009	2013
Buenos Aires	Mario Leandro Barbieri	Radical Civic Union	2009	2013
Buenos Aires	Sergio Ariel Basteiro	New Encounter	2007	2011
Buenos Aires	Gloria Mercedes Bidegain	Front for Victory–PJ	2007	2011
Buenos Aires	Graciela Camaño	Peronist	2007	2011
Buenos Aires	Elisa Beatriz Carca	Civic Coalition	2007	2011
Buenos Aires	Remo Gerardo Carlotto	Front for Victory–PJ	2009	2013
Buenos Aires	Luis Francisco Jorge Cicogna	Front for Victory–PJ	2009	2013
Buenos Aires	Diana Beatriz Conti	Front for Victory–PJ	2009	2013
Buenos Aires	Ricardo Oscar Cuccovillo	Socialist Party	2007	2011
Buenos Aires	Francisco de Narváez	Federal Peronism	2009	2013
Buenos Aires	Edgardo Fernando Depetri	Front for Victory–PJ	2010 (Note: Since 3 November 2010. Replaced Néstor Kirchner.)	2013
Buenos Aires	Juliana Di Tullio	Front for Victory–PJ	2009	2013
Buenos Aires	José María Díaz Bancalari	Front for Victory–PJ	2007	2011
Buenos Aires	Victoria Analía Donda Pérez	Freemen of the South	2007	2011
Buenos Aires	Gustavo Alberto Dutto	Front for Victory–PJ	2010 (Note: Since 3 November 2010. Replaced Ramón Ruiz.)	2011
Buenos Aires	Norberto Pedro Erro	Radical Civic Union	2007	2011
Buenos Aires	Gustavo Alfredo Horacio Ferrari	Federal Peronism	2009	2013
Buenos Aires	Héctor "Toty" Flores	Civic Coalition	2007	2011
Buenos Aires	Natalia Gambaro	Federal Peronism	2009	2013
Buenos Aires	María Teresa García	Front for Victory–PJ	2009	2013
Buenos Aires	Patricia Susana Gardella	Federal Current of Thought	2007	2011
Buenos Aires	Graciela María Giannettasio	Front for Victory–PJ	2007	2011
Buenos Aires	Gladys Esther González	PRO	2009	2013
Buenos Aires	Dulce Granados	Front for Victory–PJ	2009	2013
Buenos Aires	Christian Alejandro Gribaudo	PRO	2007	2011
Buenos Aires	Nora Graciela Iturraspe	Popular Unity	2009	2013
Buenos Aires	Daniel Katz	Radical Civic Union	2007	2011
Buenos Aires	Carlos Miguel Kunkel	Front for Victory–PJ	2009	2013
Buenos Aires	Rubén Orfel Lanceta	Radical Civic Union	2007	2011
Buenos Aires	Jorge Alberto Landau	Front for Victory–PJ	2007	2011
Buenos Aires	Julio Rubén Ledesma	Federal Current of Thought	2009	2013
Buenos Aires	María Laura Leguizamón	Front for Victory–PJ	2007	2011
Buenos Aires	María Virginia Linares	GEN	2007	2011
Buenos Aires	Juan Carlos Lorges	Front for Victory–PJ	2009 (Note: Since 20 May 2009. Replaced Felipe Solá.)	2011
Buenos Aires	Eduardo Gabriel Macaluse	Popular Unity	2007	2011
Buenos Aires	Silvia Cristina Majdalani	PRO	2009	2013
Buenos Aires	Soledad Martínez	PRO	2009	2013
Buenos Aires	Gerardo Fabián Milman	GEN	2009	2013
Buenos Aires	Juan Carlos Morán	Civic Coalition	2007	2011
Buenos Aires	Carlos Julio Moreno	Front for Victory–PJ	2009	2013
Buenos Aires	Roberto Mario Mouilleron	Federal Peronism	2009	2013
Buenos Aires	Ariel Osvaldo Eloy Pasini	Front for Victory–PJ	2007	2011
Buenos Aires	Adrián Pérez	Civic Coalition	2007	2011
Buenos Aires	Héctor Horacio Piemonte	Civic Coalition	2009	2013
Buenos Aires	Francisco Omar Plaini	Front for Victory–PJ	2009	2013
Buenos Aires	Adriana Victoria Puiggrós	Front for Victory–PJ	2007	2011
Buenos Aires	Elsa Siria Quiroz	Civic Coalition	2007	2011
Buenos Aires	Héctor Pedro Recalde	Front for Victory–PJ	2009	2013
Buenos Aires	Sandra Adriana Rioboo	Radical Civic Union	2007	2011
Buenos Aires	Raúl Alberto Rivara	Peronist Union	2009	2013
Buenos Aires	Jorge Rivas	New Encounter	2009	2013
Buenos Aires	Marcela Virginia Rodríguez	Egalitarian and Participative Democracy	2009	2013
Buenos Aires	Claudia Mónica Rucci	Federal Peronism	2009	2013
Buenos Aires	Ramón Ruiz	Front for Victory–PJ	2007	2010 (Note: Died on 20 September 2010. Replaced by Gustavo Alberto Dutto.)
Buenos Aires	Martín Sabbatella	New Encounter	2009	2013
Buenos Aires	Lidia Elsa "Pinky" Satragno	PRO	2007	2011
Buenos Aires	Adela Rosa Segarra	Front for Victory–PJ	2007	2011
Buenos Aires	Gustavo Eduardo Serebrinsky	Radical Civic Union	2007	2011
Buenos Aires	Juan Carlos Sluga	Front for Victory–PJ	2007	2011
Buenos Aires	Felipe Carlos Solá	Peronist Union	2009	2013
Buenos Aires	Margarita Rosa Stolbizer	GEN	2009	2013
Buenos Aires	María Luisa Storani	Radical Civic Union	2009	2013
Buenos Aires	Juan Pedro Tunessi	Radical Civic Union	2009	2013
Buenos Aires	Silvia Beatriz Vázquez	FORJA Concertation Party	2007	2011
Buenos Aires	Mariano Federico West	Front for Victory–PJ	2009	2011 (Note: Resigned on 10 December 2011. Replaced by Mabel Hilda Müller.)
Buenos Aires City	Laura Alonso	PRO	2009	2013
Buenos Aires City	Alcira Susana Argumedo	Project South Movement	2009	2013
Buenos Aires City	María Paula Bertol	PRO	2009	2013
Buenos Aires City	Miguel Luis Bonasso	Dialogue for Buenos Aires	2007	2011
Buenos Aires City	Esteban José Bullrich	PRO	2009	2010 (Note: Resigned on 10 August 2010 to become Minister of Education of Buenos Aires City. Replaced by Julián Martín Obiglio.)
Buenos Aires City	Patricia Bullrich	Civic Coalition	2007	2011
Buenos Aires City	Jorge Justo Cardelli	Project South Movement	2009	2013
Buenos Aires City	Elisa María Avelina "Lilita" Carrió	Civic Coalition	2009	2013
Buenos Aires City	Robert Vincent "Roy" Cortina	Socialist Party	2007	2011
Buenos Aires City	Alfonso Prat-Gay	Civic Coalition	2009	2013
Buenos Aires City	Ricardo Rodolfo Gil Lavedra	Radical Civic Union	2009	2013
Buenos Aires City	Claudia Fernanda Gil Lozano	Civic Coalition	2007	2011
Buenos Aires City	Silvana Myriam Giudici	Radical Civic Union	2007	2011
Buenos Aires City	Juan Carlos Dante Gullo	Front for Victory–PJ	2007	2011
Buenos Aires City	Carlos Salomón Heller	New Encounter	2009	2013
Buenos Aires City	Cynthia Liliana Hotton	Values for my Country	2007	2011
Buenos Aires City	Vilma Lidia Ibarra	New Encounter	2007	2011
Buenos Aires City	Fernando Adolfo Iglesias	Civic Coalition	2007	2011
Buenos Aires City	Claudio Raúl Lozano	Popular Unity	2007	2011
Buenos Aires City	Marta Gabriela Michetti	PRO	2009	2013
Buenos Aires City	Julián Martín Obiglio	PRO	2010 (Note: Since 13 October 2010. Replaced Esteban Bullrich.)	2013
Buenos Aires City	Liliana Beatriz Parada	Popular Unity	2009	2013
Buenos Aires City	Federico Pinedo	PRO	2007	2011
Buenos Aires City	María Fernanda Reyes	Civic Coalition	2007	2011
Buenos Aires City	Fernando Ezequiel "Pino" Solanas	Project South Movement	2009	2013
Buenos Aires City	Alberto Jorge Triaca	PRO	2009	2013
Catamarca	María Julia Acosta	Front for Victory–PJ	2007	2011
Catamarca	Genaro Aurelio Collantes	Radical Civic Union	2009	2009 (Note: Died on 25 December 2009. Replaced by Pedro Omar Molas.)
Catamarca	Dalmacio Enrique Mera Figueroa	Front for Victory–PJ	2009	2013
Catamarca	Pedro Omar Molas	Radical Civic Union	2010 (Note: Since 17 March 2010. Replaced Genaro Collantes.)	2013
Catamarca	Raúl Omar Paroli	Civic and Social Front of Catamarca	2007	2011
Catamarca	María Alejandra Veaute	Radical Civic Union	2009	2013
Chaco	Viviana Mónica Damilano Grivarello	Front for Victory–PJ	2007	2011
Chaco	Sandra Marcela Mendoza	Front for Victory–PJ	2009	2013
Chaco	Antonio Arnaldo María Morante	Front for Victory–PJ	2007	2011
Chaco	Pablo Eduardo Orsolini	Radical Civic Union	2009	2013
Chaco	María Inés Pilatti Vergara	Front for Victory–PJ	2009	2013
Chaco	Alicia Terada	Civic Coalition	2009	2013
Chaco	Carlos Urlich	Radical Civic Union	2007	2011
Chubut	Rosa Laudelina Chiquichano	Front for Victory–PJ	2007	2011
Chubut	Oscar Rubén Currilen	Peronist	2009	2013
Chubut	Nancy Susana González	Front for Victory–PJ	2009	2013
Chubut	Manuel Amor Morejón	Peronist	2007	2011
Chubut	Juan Mario Pais	Front for Victory–PJ	2007	2011
Córdoba	Oscar Raúl Aguad	Radical Civic Union	2009	2013
Córdoba	Gumersindo Federico Alonso	Civic Front of Córdoba	2009	2013
Córdoba	Daniel Edgardo Asef	Peronist Unity Core	2010 (Note: Since 21 April 2010. Replaced César Albrisi.)	2011
Córdoba	Griselda Ángela Baldata	Civic Coalition	2007	2011
Córdoba	Nora Esther Bedano	Front for Victory–PJ	2007	2011
Córdoba	Héctor Eduardo del Campillo	Radical Civic Union	2007	2011
Córdoba	Gladys Susana Espíndola	Radical Civic Union	2009	2013
Córdoba	Hipólito Faustinelli	Radical Civic Union	2009	2013
Córdoba	Francisco José Fortuna	Federal Córdoba	2009	2013
Córdoba	Estela Ramona Garnero	Federal Córdoba	2009	2013
Córdoba	Ernesto Félix Martínez	Civic Front of Córdoba	2009	2013
Córdoba	Heriberto Agustín Martínez Oddone	Radical Civic Union	2007	2011
Córdoba	Susana del Valle Mazzarella	Civic Front of Córdoba	2009	2013
Córdoba	Paula Cecilia Merchán	Freemen of the South	2007	2011
Córdoba	Jorge Luciano Montoya	Peronist Unity Core	2007	2011
Córdoba	Carmen Rosa Nebreda	Front for Victory–PJ	2009	2013
Córdoba	Silvia Storni	Radical Civic Union	2007	2011
Córdoba	Juan Carlos Vega	Civic Coalition	2007	2011
Corrientes	José Ameghino Arbo	Radical Civic Union	2007	2011
Corrientes	María Josefa Areta	Frente de Todos	2007	2011
Corrientes	Lucio Bernardo Aspiazu	Radical Civic Union	2009	2013
Corrientes	María Elena Petrona Chieno	Front for Victory–PJ	2009	2013
Corrientes	Rodolfo Alfredo Fernández	Radical Civic Union	2009	2013
Corrientes	Hugo Rubén Perié	Front for Victory–PJ	2007	2011 (Note: Died on 15 August 2011. Replaced by Ana María Perroni.)
Corrientes	Ana María Perroni	Front for Victory–PJ	2011 (Note: Since 7 September 2011. Replaced Hugo Perié.)	2011
Corrientes	Agustín Alberto Portela	Radical Civic Union	2007	2011
Entre Ríos	Antonio Aníbal Alizegui	Front for Victory–PJ	2009 (Note: Since 10 December 2009. Replaced Cristina Cremer de Busti in her 2007–2011 term.)	2011
Entre Ríos	Raúl Enrique Barrandeguy	Front for Victory–PJ	2009	2013
Entre Ríos	Atilio Francisco Salvador Benedetti	Radical Civic Union	2009	2013
Entre Ríos	Jorge Omar Chemes	Radical Civic Union	2009	2013
Entre Ríos	María Cristina Cremer de Busti	Federal Peronism	2009	2013
Entre Ríos	Gustavo Cusinato	Radical Civic Union	2007	2011
Entre Ríos	Hilma Leonor Ré	Civic Coalition	2009	2013
Entre Ríos	Lisandro Alfredo Viale	Socialist Party	2007	2011
Entre Ríos	Gustavo Marcelo Zavallo	Federal Peronism	2007	2011
Formosa	Ricardo Buryaile	Radical Civic Union	2009	2013
Formosa	María Graciela de la Rosa	Front for Victory–PJ	2007	2011
Formosa	Juan Carlos Díaz Roig	Front for Victory–PJ	2009	2013
Formosa	Carlos Guillermo Donkin	Front for Victory–PJ	2010 (Note: Since 10 November 2010. Replaced Luis María Fernández Basualdo.)	2011
Formosa	Luis María Fernández Basualdo	Front for Victory–PJ	2007	2010 (Note: Died on 21 October 2010. Replaced by Carlos Guillermo Donkin.)
Formosa	Rafael Ángel López	Front for Victory–PJ	2007	2011
Jujuy	María Eugenia Bernal	Front for Victory–PJ	2009	2013
Jujuy	Eduardo Alfredo Fellner	Front for Victory–PJ	2007	2011
Jujuy	Mario Raymundo Fiad	Radical Civic Union	2009	2013
Jujuy	Miguel Ángel Giubergia	Radical Civic Union	2007	2011
Jujuy	Ermindo Edgardo Marcelo Llanos	Front for Victory–PJ	2009	2013
Jujuy	Mario Humberto Martiarena	Jujuy Peronism	2007	2011
La Pampa	Ulises Humberto José Forte	Radical Civic Union	2009	2013
La Pampa	Irma Adriana García	Peronist Union	2007	2011
La Pampa	Eduardo Enrique Federico Kenny	Radical Civic Union	2007	2011
La Pampa	María Cristina Regazzoli	La Pampa Justicialist Party	2009	2013
La Pampa	Roberto Ricardo Robledo	La Pampa Justicialist Party	2009	2013
La Rioja	Hilda Clelia Aguirre de Soria	Front for Victory–PJ	2007	2011
La Rioja	Julio César Martínez	Radical Civic Union	2009	2013
La Rioja	Alberto Nicolás Paredes Urquiza	Front for Victory–PJ	2007	2011
La Rioja	Marta Beatriz Quintero	Front for Victory–PJ	2009 (Note: Since 25 November 2009. Replaced Jesús Fernando Rejal.)	2011
La Rioja	Jorge Raúl Yoma	Front for Victory–PJ	2009	2013
Mendoza	Héctor Jorge Álvaro	Concertation	2007	2011
Mendoza	Omar Bruno De Marchi	Democratic Party of Mendoza	2009	2013
Mendoza	Patricia Susana Fadel	Front for Victory–PJ	2007	2011
Mendoza	Omar Chafí Félix	Front for Victory–PJ	2009	2013
Mendoza	Juan Dante González	Front for Victory–PJ	2007	2011
Mendoza	Mariana Juri	Radical Civic Union	2009	2013
Mendoza	Ricardo Alfredo Mansur	Radical Civic Union	2009	2013
Mendoza	Guillermo Antonio Pereyra	Front for Victory–PJ	2007	2011
Mendoza	Sergio Damián Pinto	Radical Civic Union	2009 (Note: Since 25 November 2009. Replaced Laura Montero.)	2011
Mendoza	Enrique Luis Thomas	Federal Peronism	2009	2013
Misiones	Juan Manuel Irrazábal	Front for Victory–PJ	2007	2011
Misiones	Stella Maris Leverberg	Front for Victory–PJ	2007	2011
Misiones	Timoteo Llera	Front for Victory–PJ	2007	2011
Misiones	Julia Argentina Perié	Front for Victory–PJ	2007	2011
Misiones	Federico Ramón Puerta	Federal Peronism	2009	2013
Misiones	Silvia Lucrecia Risko	Front for Victory–PJ	2009	2013
Misiones	Alex Roberto Ziegler	Front for Victory–PJ	2009	2013
Neuquén	José Ricardo Brillo	Neuquén People's Movement	2009	2013
Neuquén	Alicia Marcela Comelli	Neuquén People's Movement	2007	2011
Neuquén	Olga Elizabeth Guzmán	Neuquén People's Movement	2009	2013
Neuquén	Hugo Nelson Prieto	Concertation	2007	2011
Neuquén	Horacio Rodolfo Quiroga	Radical Civic Union	2009	2013
Río Negro	Oscar Edmundo Nicolás Albrieu	Front for Victory–PJ	2009	2013
Río Negro	Hugo Castañón	Radical Civic Union	2009	2013
Río Negro	Jorge Alberto Cejas	Front for Victory–PJ	2007	2011
Río Negro	Cipriana Lorena Rossi	Peronist Union	2007	2011
Río Negro	Juan Carlos Scalesi	Federal Consensus	2007	2011
Salta	Zulema Beatriz Daher	Peronist Union	2007	2011
Salta	Marcelo Eduardo López Arias	Peronist	2007	2011
Salta	Alfredo Horacio Olmedo	We Are All Salta	2009	2013
Salta	Mónica Liliana Torfe	Salta Renewal Party	2007	2011
Salta	José Antonio Vilariño	Front for Victory–PJ	2007	2011
Salta	Walter Raúl Wayar	Federal Peronist Front	2009	2013
Salta	Fernando Yarade	Front for Victory–PJ	2009	2013
San Juan	Graciela María Caselles	Front for Victory–PJ	2007	2011
San Juan	Margarita Ferrá de Bartol	Front for Victory–PJ	2009	2013 (Note: Died on 11 October 2013.)
San Juan	Juan Carlos Gioja	Front for Victory–PJ	2007	2011
San Juan	Ruperto Eduardo Godoy	Front for Victory–PJ	2007	2011
San Juan	Eduardo Mauricio Ibarra	Federal Peronism	2009	2013
San Juan	Héctor Daniel Tomas	Front for Victory–PJ	2009	2013
San Luis	Ivana María Bianchi	Federal Peronism	2007	2011
San Luis	Mario Raúl Merlo	Federal Peronism	2007	2011
San Luis	Sergio Horacio Pansa	Federal Peronism	2009	2013
San Luis	Alberto José Pérez	Federal Peronism	2009	2013
San Luis	Nora Esther Videla	Federal Peronism	2009	2013
Santa Cruz	Elsa María Álvarez	Radical Civic Union	2009	2013
Santa Cruz	Blanca Blanco de Peralta	Front for Victory–PJ	2009	2013
Santa Cruz	Eduardo Raúl Costa	Radical Civic Union	2009	2013
Santa Cruz	Beatriz Liliana Korenfeld	Front for Victory–PJ	2007	2011
Santa Cruz	Evaristo Arturo Rodríguez	Front for Victory–PJ	2007	2011
Santa Fe	Walter Alfredo Agosto	Federal Peronism	2007	2011
Santa Fe	Jorge Mario Álvarez	Radical Civic Union	2009	2013
Santa Fe	Celia Isabel Arena	Federal Peronism	2009	2013
Santa Fe	Miguel Ángel Barrios	Socialist Party	2007	2011
Santa Fe	Verónica Claudia Benas	Popular Unity	2007	2011
Santa Fe	Carlos Alberto Carranza	Federal Peronism	2009	2013
Santa Fe	Alicia Mabel Ciciliani	Socialist Party	2009	2013
Santa Fe	Carlos Marcelo Comi	Civic Coalition	2009	2013
Santa Fe	Carlos Alberto Favario	Democratic Progressive Party	2009	2013
Santa Fe	Mónica Haydée Fein	Socialist Party	2007	2011
Santa Fe	Paulina Esther Fiol	Front for Victory–PJ	2007	2011
Santa Fe	Juan Carlos Forconi	Federal Peronism	2009	2013
Santa Fe	Susana Rosa García	Civic Coalition	2007	2011
Santa Fe	Daniel Germano	Federal Peronism	2009	2013
Santa Fe	Gustavo Ángel Marconato	Front for Victory–PJ	2007	2011
Santa Fe	Jorge Alberto Obeid	Federal Peronism	2007	2011
Santa Fe	Fabián Francisco Peralta	GEN	2007	2011
Santa Fe	Agustín Oscar Rossi	Front for Victory–PJ	2009	2013
Santa Fe	Alejandro Luis Rossi	Front for Victory–PJ	2007	2011
Santiago del Estero	Norma Amanda Abdala de Matarazzo	Civic Front for Santiago	2009	2013
Santiago del Estero	Daniel Agustín Brue	Civic Front for Santiago	2009	2013
Santiago del Estero	José Alberto Herrera	Civic Front for Santiago	2007	2011
Santiago del Estero	Ana Zulema Luna de Marcos	Civic Front for Santiago	2007	2011
Santiago del Estero	Cristian Rodolfo Oliva	Civic Front for Santiago	2009	2013
Santiago del Estero	Mirta Ameliana Pastoriza	Civic Front for Santiago	2007	2011
Santiago del Estero	Jorge Raúl Pérez	Civic Front for Santiago	2007	2011
Tierra del Fuego	Nélida Belous	Patagonian Social Party	2007	2011
Tierra del Fuego	Rosana Andrea Bertone	Front for Victory–PJ	2009	2013
Tierra del Fuego	Mariel Calchaquí	Front for Victory–PJ	2007	2011
Tierra del Fuego	Liliana Fadul	Fueguian Federal Party	2009	2013
Tierra del Fuego	Rubén Darío Sciutto	Front for Victory–PJ	2007	2011
Tucumán	Germán Enrique Alfaro	Front for Victory–PJ	2007	2011
Tucumán	Juan Francisco Casañas	Radical Civic Union	2009	2013
Tucumán	Norah Susana Castaldo	Radical Civic Union	2009 (Note: Since 9 August 2009. Replaced José Ignacio García Hamilton.)	2011
Tucumán	Stella Maris Córdoba	Front for Victory–PJ	2009	2013
Tucumán	Alfredo Carlos Dato	Front for Victory–PJ	2007	2011
Tucumán	Susana Eladia Díaz	Front for Victory–PJ	2007	2011
Tucumán	Miriam Graciela Gallardo	Front for Victory–PJ	2009	2013
Tucumán	Juan Arturo Salim	Front for Victory–PJ	2009	2013
Tucumán	Gerónimo Vargas Aignasse	Front for Victory–PJ	2007	2011
