= EYJ =

EYJ, EyJ, or Eyj may refer to:

- Eyj, alternative name for Ij, Iran
- EYJ, ANSI code for a type of multifaceted reflector light bulb
- EyJ, abbreviation for Emancipation and Justice, party of Claudio Raúl Lozano, an Argentine deputy
