= Ivana María Bianchi =

Argentine politician

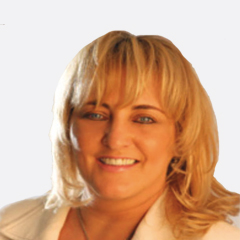

Member of the Argentine Chamber of Deputies
- In office 16 August 2007 – 9 December 2019
- Constituency: Corrientes Province

Personal details
- Party: Federal Commitment

Ivana María Bianchi is an Argentine politician from the Federal Commitment. She was a member of the Argentine Chamber of Deputies from 2007 to 2019.

In 2020, she was appointed Director of Sports Infrastructure and Equipment at the Ministry of Tourism and Sport.

== See also ==
- List of Argentine deputies, 2007–2009
- List of Argentine deputies, 2009–2011
- List of Argentine deputies, 2011–2013
- List of Argentine deputies, 2013–2015
- List of Argentine deputies, 2015–2017
- List of Argentine deputies, 2017–2019
