= Ernesto Félix Martínez =

Argentine politician

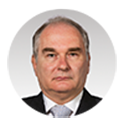

National Senator
- In office 10 December 2015 – 10 December 2021
- Constituency: Córdoba

National Deputy
- In office 10 December 2009 – 10 December 2013
- Constituency: Córdoba

Personal details
- Born: 21 June 1956 (age 69) Buenos Aires, Argentina
- Party: Civic Front of Córdoba
- Other political affiliations: Broad Front UNEN (2013–2015); Juntos por el Cambio (since 2019)

Ernesto Félix Martínez (born 21 June 1956) is an Argentine politician, who was a National Senator for Córdoba Province from 2015 to 2021 and a National Deputy from 2009 to 2013. He belongs to the Civic Front of Córdoba, a provincial party allied with the Juntos por el Cambio coalition.

== Early and personal life ==
Martínez was born on 21 June 1956 in Buenos Aires. He studied law at the National University of Córdoba, graduating in 1979. He is married to Elizabeth Daga and has two children.

== Political career ==
In 1987, Martínez worked as an advisor to the constituent assembly formed to rewrite the constitution of Córdoba Province. He would play a similar role for the constituent assembly of the City of Córdoba from 1994 to 1995. Later, he worked as a legal advisor for the Córdoba city government from 2003 to 2007, during the mayorship of Luis Juez. From 2007 to 2009, he was a member of the city's Court of Accounts.

In the 2009 legislative election, he was elected to the National Chamber of Deputies on the Civic Front list, which grouped the Civic Front of Córdoba, the Civic Coalition ARI, and the Socialist Party, among other small local parties. He was the third candidate in the list, which received 28.06% of the vote and was the second-most voted alliance in Córdoba Province. Martínez served as president of the five-member Civic Front of Córdoba parliamentary bloc in the Chamber during his 2009–2013 term.

=== National Senator ===
In the 2015 general election, Martínez was the first candidate in the Cambiemos list to the National Senate, followed by Laura Rodríguez Machado. With 50.23% of the vote, Cambiemos was the most-voted alliance in the province, granting Martínez and Rodríguez Machado the two seats for the majority as per the limited voting system used for the Argentine upper house. He was sworn in on 3 December 2015. In the Senate, he sat as part of the PRO Front bloc.

As senator, Caserio formed part of the parliamentary commissions on Constitutional Affairs, General Legislation, Accords, National Defense, and Justice and Criminal Affairs, the latter three of which he served as vice president of. He was a supporter of the legalisation of abortion in Argentina, voting in favour the two Voluntary Interruption of Pregnancy bill debated by the Argentine Congress in 2018 and 2020.

Martínez did not stand for re-election in 2021, and his term expired on 10 December 2021.
