= Guillermo Vargas Aignasse =

- Born: 1943; Andalgalá, Argentina
- Died: April 5, 1976 (aged 32–33); Argentina
- Occupation: Provincial senator for Tucumán Province
- Known for: Forced disappearance

Guillermo Vargas Aignasse (born in 1943, disappeared 1976) was an Argentine Peronist politician, serving as a provincial Senator in Tucumán Province from 1973 until his disappearance in 1976. In 2008, two former generals were jailed for life for his disappearance.

== Background ==
Vargas Aignasse was born and raised in Andalgalá, Catamarca Province, and was a physicist by profession, teaching in the discipline until his election to the Provincial Senate of Tucumán in 1973. He was elected on the Frejuli ticket that brought Peronists back to power, and was associated with the left-wing faction of Peronism, having belonged to the center-left FANE (National Student Associations Front). Amid the worst climate of violence in the country, Tucumán Province was placed under martial law in January 1975, after which Operativo Independencia, a counterinsurgency offensive, was launched by presidential order. The installation of General Antonio Domingo Bussi as its commander in December coincided with Vargas Aignasse's investigation of provincial Police Chief Colonel Antonio Arrechea on reports of drug trafficking.

The 1976 military coup, on March 24, resulted in Vargas Aignasse's arrest by provincial police, who had their detainee turn in all documentation regarding the Arrechea case. Days later, his brother, Rodolfo, was allowed to see the prisoner from above a patio, following which, per police testimony, he was released from prison on 5 April and 'kidnapped by parties unknown' while being taken home in an official car. He was later reportedly seen alive and in pain by a number of witnesses, though his whereabouts afterwards remained unknown.

Unable to do so until after the return of democracy in 1983, Rodolfo Vargas Aignasse filed a missing persons case on February 6, 1984. Ultimately, and despite the unwillingness of numerous witnesses to testify, Bussi was arrested for ordering Vargas Aignasse's abduction, on October 15, 2003. During the trial that formally began in July 2008, former trade union leader Juan Antonio Palavecino testified that he had seen Vargas Aignasse in Tucumán police headquarters showing signs of torture on April 6, 1976, one day after his supposed kidnapping, and contrary to the official story. Bussi and former General Luciano Benjamín Menéndez were found guilty of Vargas Aignasse's forced disappearance and sentenced to life imprisonment on August 28.

Rodolfo Vargas Aignasse was elected to the Argentine Chamber of Deputies in 1987, and the disappeared lawmaker's son, Gerónimo Vargas Aignasse, is currently a member of the Chamber.

== See also ==
- List of people who disappeared
