= Mariano Recalde =

Argentine politician

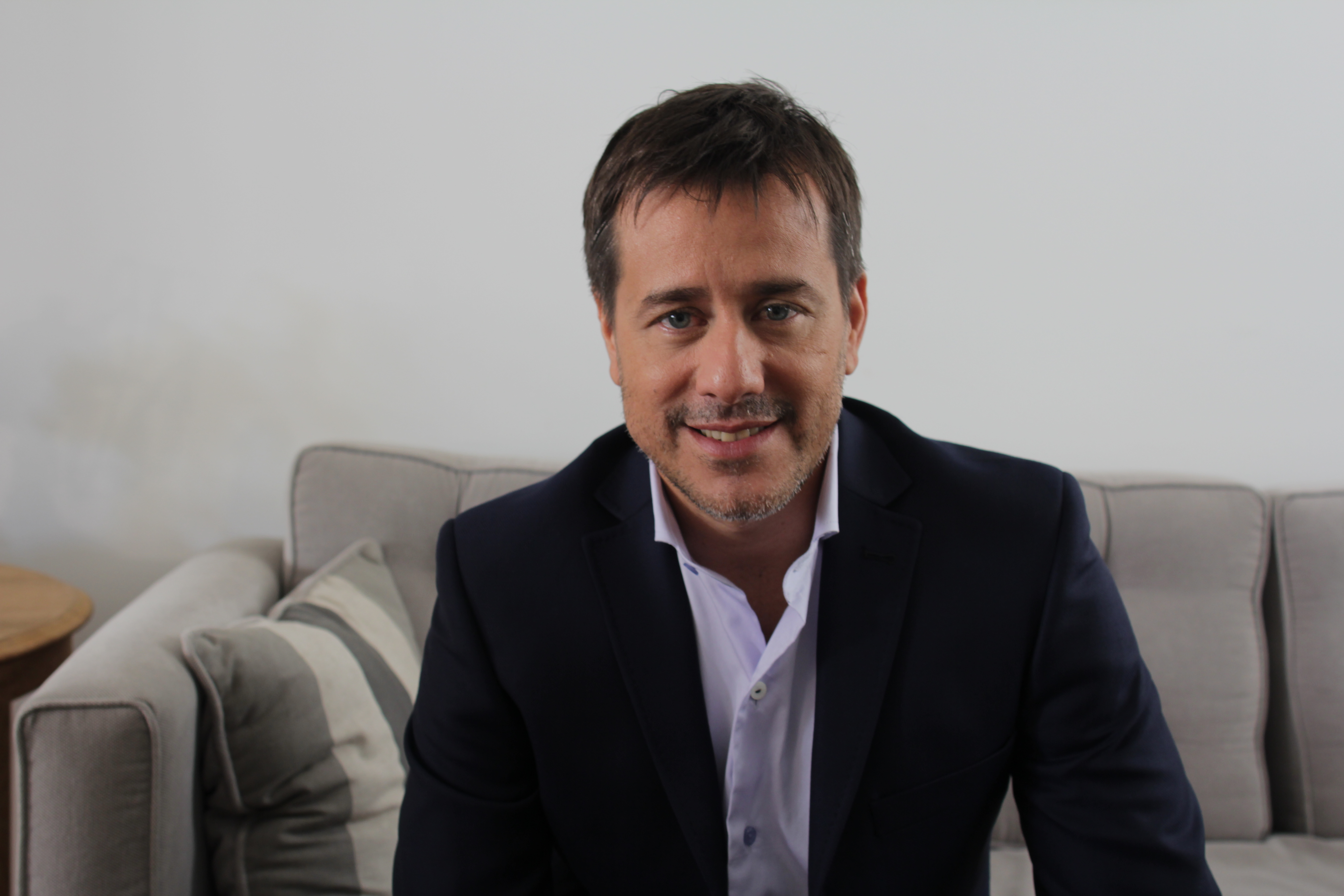
- Recalde in 2018

Councillor of Magistracy
- Incumbent
- Assumed office 6 February 2020
- Appointed by: Senate

National Senator
- Incumbent
- Assumed office 10 December 2019
- Constituency: City of Buenos Aires

Legislator of the City of Buenos Aires
- In office 10 December 2017 – 4 December 2019

Personal details
- Born: 8 April 1972 (age 54) Buenos Aires, Argentina
- Party: Justicialist Party
- Other political affiliations: Front for Victory (2003–2017); Citizen's Unity (2017–2019); Frente de Todos (since 2019–2023); Homeland Force (since 2023)
- Education: University of Buenos Aires; University of Salamanca; University of Castilla–La Mancha

Mariano Recalde (born 8 April 1972) is an Argentine lawyer and Justicialist Party politician. He currently serves as a National Senator for the Autonomous City of Buenos Aires since December 2019, representing Homeland Force. He previously served as a Legislator at the Buenos Aires City Legislature and as president of Aerolíneas Argentinas, Argentina's state-owned flag carrier airline from 2009 to 2015.

== Early life and education ==
Recalde was born on 8 April 1972 in Buenos Aires. His father is the labour attorney and politician Héctor Recalde. He finished high school at the Colegio Nacional de Buenos Aires; he also served as president of the Colegio's student union. Like his father, Mariano studied law at the University of Buenos Aires (UBA) and then went on to complete specializations on labour law at the universities of Salamanca and Castilla–La Mancha in Spain.

Recalde also has a doctorate (PhD) in labour law from the University of Buenos Aires; his doctoral thesis was on "New trends in the relationship between state and collective norms and the new rules on competences and concurrences between collective bargaining agreements". He has served as auxiliary professor in the private law and labour law courses and as professor of collective labour law at the UBA.

== Political career ==
Recalde is a founding member of La Cámpora. He is currently senator for the City of Buenos Aires by Frente de Todos. He was the president of Aerolíneas Argentinas since 2009 until December 2015. He won the 2015 primary elections of the Front for Victory for mayor of Buenos Aires; the party was ranked third in the election.

He has been a member of the Council of Magistracy of the Nation in representation of the Senate since 6 February 2020.

== Personal life ==
Recalde has three children: María Eva (named after Eva Perón), Sara and Juan Pedro. He is a supporter of Boca Juniors.

== Books ==
- Recalde, Héctor; Ciampa, Gustavo A.; Recalde, Mariano (2005). Una nueva Ley laboral: Ley 25.877 (1 ed.). Buenos Aires: Corregidor. ISBN 978-950-05-1588-7.
- Recalde, Héctor; Recalde, Mariano, eds. (2008). Crónica de una ley no negociada: el fin de los tickets (1 ed.). Buenos Aires: Corregidor. ISBN 978-950-05-1795-9.
- Recalde, Mariano (2015). El modelo sindical argentino: régimen jurídico. Proyectos especiales (1 ed.). Villa María, Argentina: Eduvim. ISBN 978-987-699-242-8.

== Electoral history ==
Electoral history of Mariano Recalde
Election	Office	List	#	District	Votes			Result	Ref.
Election	Office	List	#	District	Total	%	P.	Result	Ref.
2017	City Legislator	Porteño Unity	1	City of Buenos Aires	408,462	21.26%	2nd (Note: Presented on an electoral list. The data shown represents the share of the vote the entire party/alliance received in that constituency.)	Elected	
2019	National Senator	Frente de Todos	1	City of Buenos Aires	679,569	34.08%	2nd	Elected	
