= Luis Juez =

Argentine politician (born 1963)

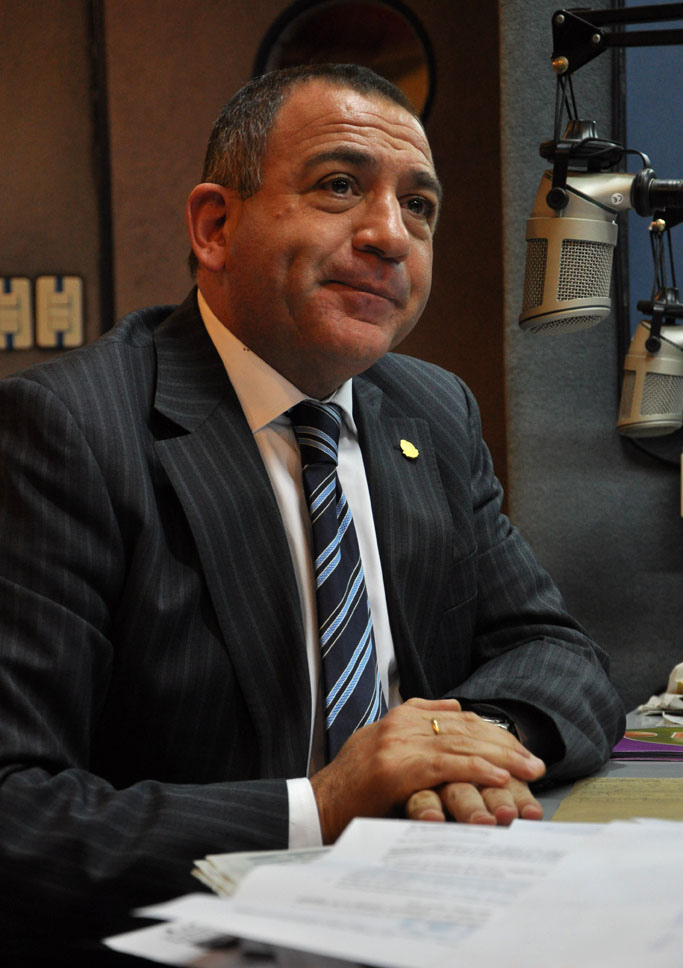
- Juez in 2011

National Deputy
- Incumbent
- Assumed office 10 December 2019
- Constituency: Córdoba

National Senator
- In office 10 December 2009 – 10 December 2015
- Constituency: Córdoba

Mayor of Córdoba
- In office 10 December 2003 – 10 December 2007
- Preceded by: Germán Kammerath
- Succeeded by: Daniel Giacomino

Personal details
- Born: 13 September 1963 (age 63) Córdoba, Córdoba Province, Argentina
- Party: Justicialist Party (1983–2002); Civic Front (2002–present)
- Spouse: Victoria Corte
- Education: National University of Córdoba
- Profession: Lawyer

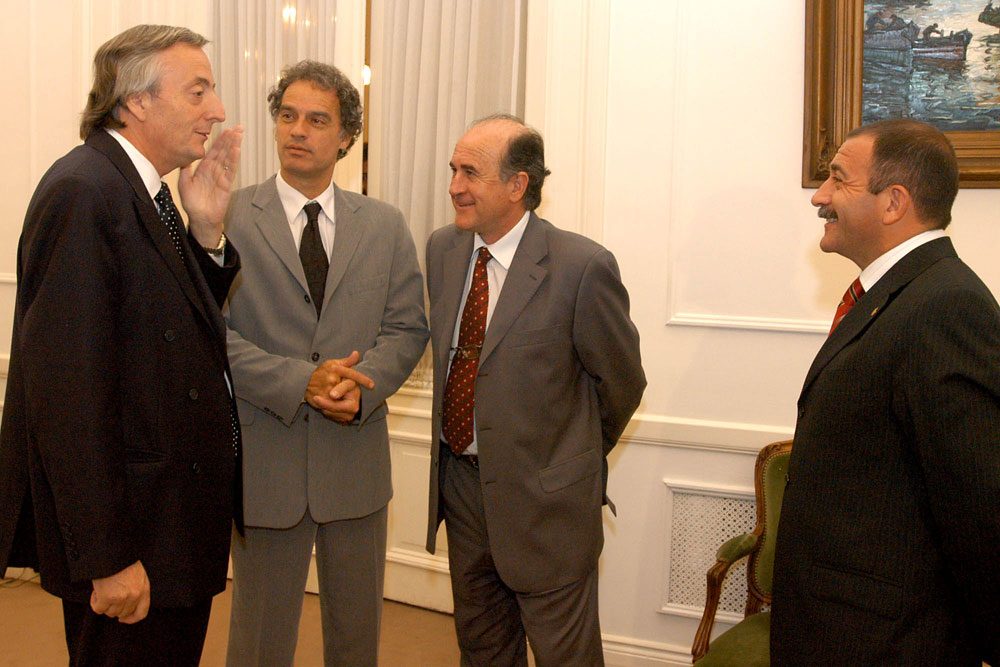
President Néstor Kirchner (left) holds forth with (from left) Buenos Aires Mayor Aníbal Ibarra, Cabinet Chief Oscar Parrilli, and Juez, in 2004. Allies of the President without belonging to his party, Ibarra and Juez became two of the leading "transversal" figures during the Kirchner Presidency.

Luis Alfredo Juez (born 13 September 1963) is an Argentine politician who served as Mayor of the City of Córdoba and was later elected to the Senate. Since 2019 he has been a National Deputy.

== Life and times ==
=== Early life and career ===
Luis Juez was born in Córdoba, Argentina, to Adela Losada, the daughter of Spanish Argentine immigrants from A Coruña, and Gabriel Juez, the son of Arab Argentine immigrants from Syria. Encouraged by his father, a former Army officer, Juez studied at the General Paz Military Lyceum, though he ultimately opted against a military career, and enrolled at the National University of Córdoba. Juez, whose father had been jailed by the dictatorship that overthrew President Juan Perón in 1955, was active in the Peronist Youth, earning a juris doctor in 1985. He married the former Victoria Corte in 1992, and they had four children.

He was appointed to the Provincial Legislature in 1994 to fill a vacancy, and in 1995, was elected on a party list headed by fellow Peronist José Manuel de la Sota. The body's approval of a bill to raise legislators' salaries amid a recession led to his resignation within a year, however. He ran for the office of Mayor of Córdoba in 1998; but he was defeated in the Justicialist Party primaries by Germán Kammerath, who had received de la Sota's endorsement. De la Sota was elected Governor in 1999, and Juez was appointed Director of the Highway Bureau.

Governor de la Sota named Juez Director of the Corruption Prosecution Office in 2000. The appointment proved contentious, however, when the director uncovered evidence of racketeering by, among others, Mayor Kammerath, Public Works Minister Carlos Caserio, and the governor's Chief of Staff (and wife), Olga Ruitort. Lacking support from the governor, Juez resigned on 10 October 2002. His alliance with de la Sota ended, though the latter recognized their 20-year friendship by allowing Juez to step down without formally accepting a resignation, which left Juez's health benefits intact; Juez's youngest daughter had been born premature, and required six months' hospitalization.

Juez left the Justicialist Party and established the Partido Nuevo (New Party). He was elected Mayor of Córdoba in 2003, defeating Governor de la Sota's nominee, Alfredo Keegan, by 30 points. Juez became a leading figure in the "transversal" trend among key center-left elected officials who, without belonging to the Front for Victory of President Néstor Kirchner, became his allies. During his tenure as mayor, he expanded numerous city services, though by the end of his term the municipal workforce had doubled, absorbing 74% of the city's US$500 million annual budget. Among the appointments made during his administration was that of Juan Carlos Rabbat, a former mayoral candidate who had won a seat on the Córdoba city council in the 2003 municipal elections, whom Juez appointed in 2005 as Secretary of International Relations and International Cooperation of the municipal government.

=== The 2007 elections ===
He declined to run for a second term in 2007, and instead became a candidate for governor. He again faced a de la Sota nominee, Vice Governor Juan Schiaretti, as well as UCR candidate Mario Negri, and organized a left-leaning Civic and Social Front with the support of the Broad Front, the Socialist Party and others. The election, on 2 September, resulted in a victory for Schiaretti by a margin of 1.17%, however.

The election became the most contentious in Argentina that year. Juez alleged electoral fraud when in a protracted, 16-hour ballot machine-counting process at the Córdoba Central Post Office from which the press was barred, overloaded circuit breakers shorted numerous times. He appealed the results, requesting a recount in court for all 6,152 precincts. His campaign was, however, granted a recount in only the 676 precincts with disputed results, and on 2 October Juez appealed to the Supreme Court of Argentina. Ultimately, results certified on 4 October narrowed the difference only slightly to 1.13% (18,000 votes).

=== Election to the Senate ===
Juez's earlier rapport with Kirchnerism soured, and in 2009, he ran for the Senate on the Civic Front Alliance party list. Running, as Juez did in 2007, against Peronist and UCR opposition, the Civic Front Alliance prevailed by a narrow margin, sending Juez and fellow Civic Front candidate Norma Morandini to the Senate; both joined the Broad Progressive Front ahead of the 2011 campaign season. He ran again for Governor of Córdoba in the 2011 provincial elections. Juez was defeated, however, by his erstwhile boss and ally, former Governor de la Sota.
