= Norma Morandini =

Argentine politician (born 1948)

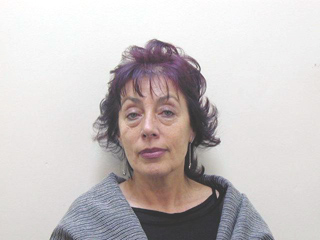

National Senator
- In office 10 December 2009 – 10 December 2015
- Constituency: Córdoba

National Deputy
- In office 10 December 2005 – 10 December 2009
- Constituency: Córdoba

Personal details
- Born: 31 March 1948 (age 78) Córdoba, Argentina
- Party: Civic Front of Córdoba
- Spouse: Flávio de Freitas Tavares
- Education: National University of Córdoba
- Profession: Journalist

Norma Elena Morandini (born 31 March 1948) is an Argentine journalist and politician. She was elected to the Argentine Senate in 2009, and was nominated as running mate by Progressive Front presidential candidate Hermes Binner for the 2011 campaign

== Life and times ==
Morandini was born in Córdoba, Argentina, in 1948. Her mother served as President of the Córdoba chapter of the Communist Party of Argentina during the 1960s. She enrolled at the National University of Córdoba, and earned degrees in communications, psychology, and medicine. She joined the Revolutionary Communist Party of Argentina following its 1968 break from the Communist Party, and lost two brothers as desaparecidos in the subsequent Dirty War.

She sought exile in Spain, where she continued her career in journalism. She worked in Lisbon from 1977 to 1980 as a news correspondent for the Pyresa news agency, for El Correo Catalán, and Revista Cambio 16, as well as for the Portuguese magazine Visao. She met left-wing journalist and Brazilian exile Flávio de Freitas Tavares, and they were married in 1980. Her career as a correspondent for Cambio 16 first took her to Brazil in 1978, and despite being separated from her husband (who was unable to return to Brazil, where he had been tortured), she would live there until 1984.

Morandini covered the Trial of the Juntas and subsequent trials against officers implicated in the Dirty War for the leading Rio de Janeiro daily O Globo until 1987. She remained in Buenos Aires, and her first book Catamarca (regarding the María Soledad Morales murder and other abuses in Catamarca Province), was published in 1991. She hosted an interview program on the TN news network, Temas & Debates, from 1992, and earned a Martín Fierro Award for her work in the program in 1994, as well as two Broadcasting Awards.

She established a short lived women's magazine, Mujeres & Compañía, in 1995, and left her post as Argentine correspondent for Cambio 16 in 1998, after which she contributed columns for Clarín until 2006, as well as for Rumbos (the Sunday magazine published by La Voz del Interior in Córdoba). She published El Harén (The Harem) in 1998, which examined the growing role of Arab Argentines in business and politics. Her work as host of Tierra de Periodistas (Land of Journalists) earned her a second Martín Fierro in 2000, and in 2001, she produced the documentary Operación Aries (in reference to the military code name of the March 1976 coup) for the 25th anniversary of the event. She later hosted Paradojas y Código N on Public Television.

Morandini was elected to the Argentine Chamber of Deputies on the Civic Front ticket in 2005, and in 2009, joined former Córdoba Mayor Luis Juez on a Civic Coalition ticket that resulted in the election of both to the Argentine Senate. She was appointed ranking member of the Committee on the Environment and Sustainable Growth during her tenure in the Senate, and on 11 June 2011, Santa Fe Governor and Socialist presidential candidate Hermes Binner nominated Morandini as his running mate on their Broad Progressive Front ticket for the 2011 campaign.
