= Claudia Bernazza =

Argentine teacher and politician

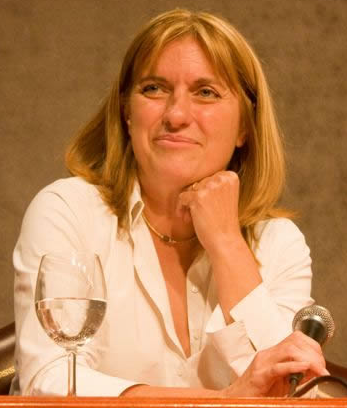

National Deputy
- In office 13 May 2020 – 10 December 2021
- Constituency: Buenos Aires
- In office 19 September 2007 – 10 December 2009
- Constituency: Buenos Aires

Personal details
- Born: 12 June 1960 (age 66) La Plata, Argentina
- Party: Justicialist Party
- Other political affiliations: Front for Victory (2003–2017); Unidad Ciudadana (2017–2019); Frente de Todos (2019–present)
- Education: National University of La Plata

Claudia Alicia Bernazza (born 12 June 1960) is an Argentine teacher, social activist and politician who served as a National Deputy elected in Buenos Aires Province on two occasions: from 2007 to 2009, when she filled in the vacancy left by Graciela Rosso, and later from 2020 to 2021, filling the vacancy left by Daniel Scioli, who was appointed Ambassador in Brazil.

== Early life and education ==
Bernazza was born on 12 June 1960 in La Plata. Her father, Ricardo, was originally from Brandsen and claimed descent from Italian immigrants, while her mother, Sofia Romaniuk, was a Ukrainian immigrant. In 2013, Bernazza orchestrated a reunion between her mother and her aunt, Lena, who was still living in Ukraine.

Bernazza finished high school at Liceo Víctor Mercante in La Plata, and then went on to study to become a teacher at Instituto Superior de Formación Docente N.º 12. She also studied agricultural engineering at the National University of La Plata, and has a master's degree and PhD from the Latin American Faculty of Social Sciences (FLACSO); her PhD thesis was on government planning in Argentina from 1974 to 2000. She currently teaches graduate and post-graduate courses at the National University of Lanús, the National University of La Plata, FLACSO, and the Arturo Jauretche National University.

== Career ==
Alongside her husband, Enrique Spinetta, Bernazza founded the Lugar del Sol Foundation for homeless children. The foundation forms part of the Movimiento Nacional Chicos del Pueblo. In 2001, she was appointed Executive Secretary of the Provincial Public Administration Institute (IPAP), later serving as its president from 2004. Simultaneously, from 2006 to 2007, she was president of the Provincial Council for Women in Buenos Aires Province.

In the 2005 legislative election, Bernazza ran for a seat in the Argentine Chamber of Deputies in the Front for Victory list in Buenos Aires; the list received 43.04% of the popular vote, not enough for Bernazza to be elected. She took office on 19 September 2007, however, in replacement of Graciela Rosso, who was elected intendente (mayor) of Luján. During this first term, Bernazza introduced a bill to create a national park in General Lavalle Partido; the bill passed both chambers of Congress, effectively creating the Campos del Tuyú National Park, the first national park in Buenos Aires Province.

Bernazza ran for the Chamber of Deputies again in the 2017 legislative election as the 19th candidate in the Unidad Ciudadana list in Buenos Aires Province. The list received 36.28% of the vote, again, not enough for Bernazza to be elected. She would take office in 2020 in replacement of Daniel Scioli, who was appointed ambassador of Argentina in Brazil. During her second term as national deputy, Bernazza formed part of the parliamentary commissions on Families and Childhood, Science and Technology, Communications, Modernization of Parliamentary Procedure, Maritime Interests, and the bicameral commission on children's rights. She was a supporter of the 2020 Voluntary Interruption of Pregnancy bill, which legalized abortion in Argentina.
