= Juan Héctor Sylvestre Begnis =

Argentine physician and politician (1937–2012)

Minister of Health of Santa Fe Province
- In office 2003–2007
- Governor: Jorge Obeid

Member of the Argentine Chamber of Deputies
- In office 2005–2009
- Constituency: Santa Fe Province

Personal details
- Born: 1937 Rosario, Santa Fe, Argentina
- Died: 4 August 2012 (aged 74–75) Rosario, Santa Fe, Argentina
- Party: Front for Victory (2005–2009)
- Other political affiliations: Radical Civic Union (until mid-2000s)
- Occupation: Physician; politician
- Nickname: Canchi

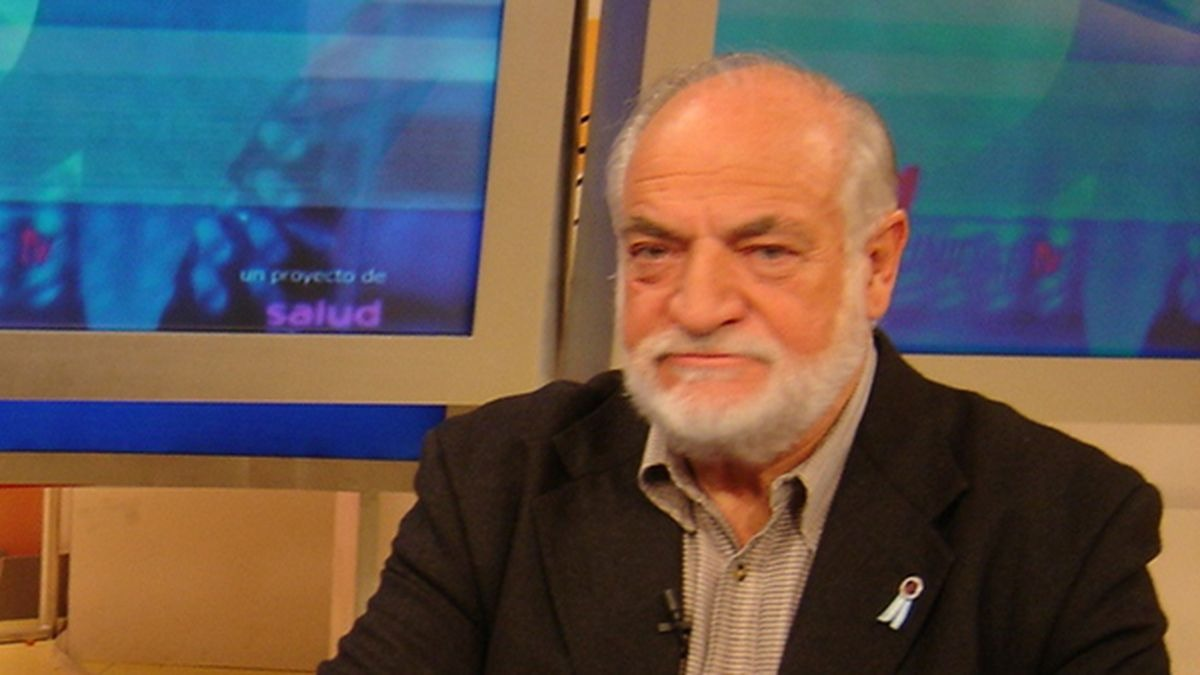
Picture of “Canchi”

Juan Héctor Sylvestre Begnis (1937 – 4 August 2012), nicknamed "Canchi", was an Argentine physician and politician. He served as Minister of Health of Santa Fe Province during Governor Jorge Obeid’s second administration (2003–2007) and as a National Deputy for Santa Fe (2005–2009), chairing the lower house Committee on Social Action and Public Health.

== Early life and education ==
Sylvestre Begnis was born in Rosario, Santa Fe, in 1937. He earned a medical degree in 1963 from the Faculty of Medicine in Rosario, then part of the National University of the Littoral (UNL). He was the son of surgeon and Santa Fe governor Carlos Sylvestre Begnis.

== Political and professional career ==
=== Provincial politics ===
Initially active in the Radical Civic Union (UCR), he ran on the UCR ticket headed by Luis Alberto “Changui” Cáceres in the 1987 Santa Fe gubernatorial election. During Governor Jorge Obeid’s second term he served as provincial Minister of Health (2003–2007).

As minister he supported Santa Fe’s smoke-free policy and broader tobacco-control agenda.

=== National Deputy (2005–2009) ===
Elected in 2005 on the Front for Victory (FPV) list for Santa Fe, he chaired the Chamber of Deputies’ Committee on Social Action and Public Health. From that role he promoted interjurisdictional coordination on public-health legislation, including the Federal Legislative Health Council (COFELESA).

=== COFELESA ===
From 2009 he helped convene cross-provincial meetings that led to the Pacto Federal Legislativo de Salud and the consolidation of the Federal Legislative Health Council (COFELESA), of which he was later named honorary president. COFELESA was subsequently formalised nationwide by Law 27.054 in 2014.

=== Other activities ===
In 2007 he was a candidate for mayor of Rosario within the FPV space led locally by Agustín Rossi.
