= Luis Lusquiños =

Argentinian politician

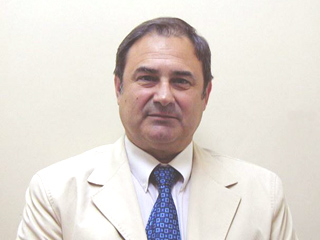

Luis Lusquiños (27 November 1951 – 17 June 2017) was an Argentine deputy for the San Luis Province. He had the highest number of absences in the 2005-2009 period. He was appointed Chief of the Cabinet of Ministers during the brief presidency of Adolfo Rodríguez Saá in 2001.

Lusquiños died on 17 June 2017 at the age of 65.
