= Eduardo Lorenzo Borocotó =

Argentinian politician (born 1934)

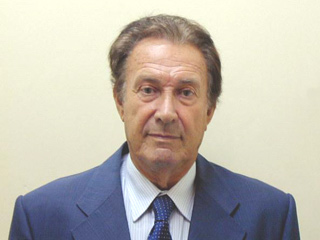
Eduardo Lorenzo Borocotó

Eduardo Lorenzo Borocotó (born 30 August 1934) is a former Argentinian politician and physician. He served as National Deputy of Argentina representing Buenos Aires. He became known due he was elected as member of Republican Proposal party, but after being elected and prior to swear in office he decided to represent the opposition party as an Independent member of the Argentine congress, but related to Justicialist Party.

He is the son of Eduardo Lorenzo, a famous Uruguayan sport journalist settled in Argentina, who was nicknamed "Borocotó". After some time Borocotó became officially the surname of Eduardo Lorenzo. Borocotó Jr. studied medicine and earned notoriety as TV host of programs related about health.

He was part of Action for the Republic, party created by the economist Domingo Cavallo. As member of this party, he was elected as Member of the City Council of Buenos Aires in 1997 and being in charge until 2001. In 2005 he was elected as deputy member of the National Congress. Soon after win the election he decided that will be outside Republican Proposal and not to support Mauricio Macri —leader of that party— and support Néstor Kirchner. No reason was given, just trascended he took the decision after a meeting with president Kirchner. A very known case of crossing the floor, the Argentine media started to use the term "borocotizar" as a verb to describe this kind of situations. After this period as member of the Congress, he retired of both politics and television in 2009.
