= Dante Gullo =

Argentine sociologist and politician (1947–2019)

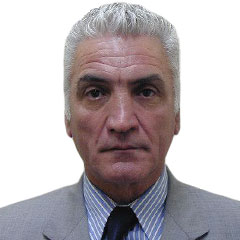
Gullo in 2007

Juan Carlos Dante Gullo (8 June 1947 – 3 May 2019) was an Argentine sociologist and politician, who was a member of the Chamber of Deputies (2007–2011) and the Buenos Aires City Legislature (2011–2015).
