= Stella Maris Leverberg =

Argentine politician (1962–2020)

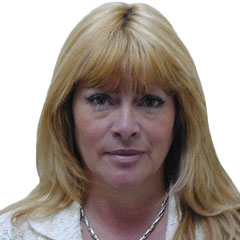
- Born: 12 September 1962; Bonpland, Argentina
- Died: 3 January 2020 (aged 57); Eldorado, Argentina
- Other names: Marilu
- Occupation: Politician
- Known for: National Deputy
- Spouse: Enso Gomez
- Children: 3

Stella Maris Raquel "Marilú" Leverberg (12 September 1962 – 3 January 2020), was an Argentine politician. She was a National Deputy for the province of Misiones and Secretary General of the local teaching union.

== Life ==
Stella Maris Raquel Leverberg was born in Bonpland in Misiones Province in September 1962. She trained and became a teacher in Oberá. She married Enso Gomez and had three children.

In 2007, she was a Front for the Renewal of Concord candidate for national deputy on a list led by Maurice Closs who was elected governor of the province. Marilú became a national deputy on 10 December 2007. In 2011 she was re-elected, a position she held until 2015.

She chaired the Special Commission for Monitoring hydroelectric projects and she was responsible for Disability, Education, Labor Legislation, Tourism & Family, Women and Children & Adolescents in the Chamber of Deputies. She was known by the nickname "Marilu"

According to a newspaper report in 2007 she introduced three strippers at a party for Argentine teachers where there were children present. The party was in Oberá and it was celebrating Teacher's Day which in Argentina is celebrated on 11 September. In 2016 she appeared in court when her son was involved in a schoolyard fight which involved a child of the Chief of Police.

On January 3, 2020, Leverberg died from cardiac arrest in Samic Hospital in Eldorado, Misiones Province, Argentina, following a traffic collision in San Pedro.
