= Rosa Chiquichano =

Mapuche Argentine lawyer and politician

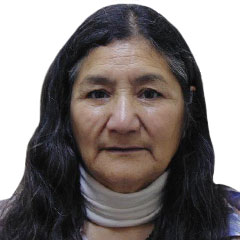

National Deputy
- In office 10 December 2007 – 10 December 2011
- Constituency: Chubut

Provincial Deputy of Chubut
- In office 10 December 2003 – 10 December 2007

Personal details
- Born: 30 August 1947 (age 79) Yala Laubat, Chubut Province, Argentina
- Party: Justicialist Party; Front for Victory
- Education: National University of Patagonia San Juan Bosco
- Occupation: Lawyer and politician

Rosa Laudelina Chiquichano Nahuelquir (born 30 August 1947) is an Argentine lawyer and politician of Tehuelche-Mapuche descent who served as Deputy for the province of Chubut between 2007 and 2011. When assuming the position, she became the first member of the Tehuelche people to take a seat in the National Congress.

== Early life and education ==
Chiquichano was born on 30 August 1947. Her great-great-grandfather was Tehuelche cacique Juan Chiquichano, and her great-grandfather, also a cacique, was Adolfo Nahuelquir Chiquichano.

She completed her education in Trelew, and became a teacher. She later studied law at the Esquel headquarters of the National University of Patagonia San Juan Bosco, graduating in 1999. Thus she became the first lawyer of Tehuelche origin.

== Political career ==
She was alternate councilor in Trelew and served as provincial legislator from 2003 until the 2007 legislative elections, she was elected national deputy to occupy second place in the Front for Victory list. She was sworn in on 5 December of that year, wearing a quillango (traditional garment of guanaco leather) and giving a speech in Tehuelche language.

In the Chamber of Deputies of the Nation, she was second vice president of the commission of cooperative, mutual and non-governmental organizations, and member of the commissions of constitutional affairs, vocal culture, human rights and guarantees, population and human development, and natural resources and conservation of the human environment. During her term, she was also a deputy to the Latin American Parliament.

Since leaving office, she has continued to fight for the rights of local indigenous communities in Chubut, especially those of the Trevelin area. She has also taught classes on environmental law at her alma mater. Her son, Augusto Ferrari Chiquichano, is a politician and has served as a councillor in Esquel.
