= Cristina Cremer de Busti =

Argentine politician

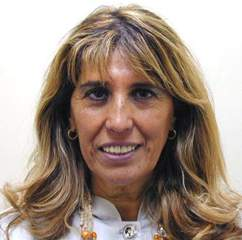
Picture of Cristina Cremer de Busti

María Cristina Cremer de Busti, née María Cristina Cremer, (b. Córdoba, Argentina) is an Argentine Justicialist politician. She was a national deputy for her province of Entre Ríos. She is the widow of Jorge Busti, who served as governor and senator for that province.

Cremer was known as 'Mary' until coming to live in Entre Ríos at the age of 24 in 1976 when people began to call her 'Cristina'. Cremer and Busti married in 1974 and have three children and three grandchildren. She studied four years of a law career at the Universidad Católica de Córdoba where she was active in the Peronist Youth.

Cremer was director of the Provincial Disability Institute until her election as deputy in 2007, heading the list of the Front for Victory. Her husband ended his term as governor at the same election. There had been speculation that she would stand as governor herself. In Congress she is the 1st Vice President of the Committee on Natural Resources and Human Environment.
