= Lía Fabiola Bianco =

Argentinian lawyer and politician

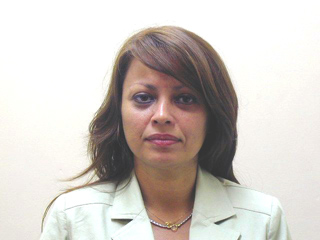

Minister of Cooperatives, Mutual, Trade and Integration of Misiones
- In office 14 December 2009 – 10 December 2015
- Preceded by: Luis Jacobo
- Succeeded by: Élida Vigo

National Deputy
- In office 10 December 2005 – 10 December 2009
- Constituency: Misiones

Personal details
- Born: 10 September 1966 (age 59) Misiones
- Party: Front for Victory
- Education: National University of the Northeast
- Occupation: Lawyer

Lía Fabiola Bianco (born 10 September 1966) is an Argentinian politician and lawyer. Bianco studied at the National University of the Northeast and graduated as a lawyer specializing in labor law on 8 July 1990.

Between 1991 and 2001, Bianco worked as head of the Department of Legal Advice, belonging Undersecretariat of Labor and Employment of the province of Misiones and reached its highest position in 2002. In 2005, she was appointed president of the Provincial Commission for the Eradication of Child Labor, created by provincial decree in 2002. On 10 December 2005, Bianco took office as a national deputy representing Misiones Province in the National Congress of Argentina.

On 29 July 2016, she was sworn in as President of the Honorable Court of Accounts of the Province of Misiones. The ceremony was headed by Governor Hugo Passalacqua, who was accompanied by members of the board of the aforementioned body, who endorsed the act before the General Notary Public whereas it had previously been confirmed by degree of the provincial executive power, the provincial House of Representatives, as per the Constitution of the Province of Misiones.
