= Héctor Toty Flores =

Argentinian politician

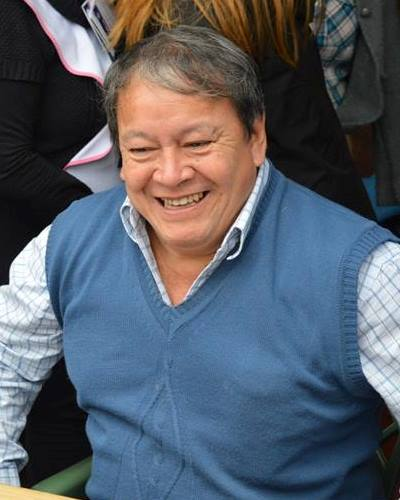
Héctor "Toty" Flores

Héctor "Toty" Flores (San José de Feliciano, Entre Rios, Argentina, December 8, 1953) is a politician and Argentine social leader.

== Career ==
He is the founder of Cooperativa La Juanita. He has been a National Deputy for the Civic Coalition ARI, represented in the province of Buenos Aires, a position that he held between 2007 and 2011. He is leader of the Humanist Movement of Resistance and Construction 2012 and president of the incipient political party of Buenos Aires Social Movement for the Republic. He lives in the La Juanita neighborhood in the town of Laferrere (La Matanza party).

He was a running mate of Elisa Carrió as a pre-candidate for Vice President of the Nation, representing the Civic Coalition ARI.
