= Nora Ginzburg =

Argentine lawyer and politician

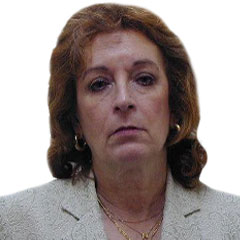

National Deputy
- In office 10 December 2005 – 10 December 2009
- Constituency: City of Buenos Aires

Personal details
- Born: Nora Raquel Ginzburg; 6 April 1949 (age 77) Buenos Aires, Argentina
- Party: Democratic Socialist Party (until 1976); Radical Civic Union (1986–2002); Recreate for Growth (2002–2008)
- Other political affiliations: Republican Proposal (2005–2008)
- Occupation: Lawyer, politician
- Website: www.noraginzburg.com.ar

Nora Raquel Ginzburg (born 6 April 1949) is an Argentine lawyer and politician. She was a National Deputy for the city of Buenos Aires for the Recreate for Growth party from 2005 to 2009.

== Biography ==
Nora Ginzburg was born on 6 April 1949. Of Jewish descent on her paternal side, her grandparents were killed by the Nazis in the Auschwitz concentration camp. She graduated as a lawyer in 1974, and began her career in public service as a municipal advisor for the city of Puerto San Julián from 1986 to 1987.

== Professional career ==
In 1993, Ginzburg went to work for the municipal government of Buenos Aires and its Deliberative Council in various advisory positions. She was a member of the constitutional convention of the city of Buenos Aires for the Radical Civic Union in 1996. She entered the city's new government in various positions from 1997 to 2000. In 2001 she moved to the national government with a position in the Ministry of Homeland Security.

She was a member of the national Chamber of Deputies from December 2005 to 2009 for the Republican Proposal (PRO) alliance, which she left in 2008 due to differences with Federico Pinedo, and formed the Front for Citizen Rights. She was a member of the Commissions of Criminal Legislation, Foreign Relations and Worship, Homeland Security, National Defense, and Petitions, Powers, and Regulations.

In 2006, she defended the admission of Luis Patti to the Chamber:

The Patti issue is a very serious accusation. For a person convicted of crimes of that humanity, we would all have agreed not to admit them. Here, the serious thing is that there is only one request from a prosecutor asking for nullity for a dismissal issued years ago.

She was one of the legislators who chose not to attend a March 2006 session in which the Chamber repudiated the 1976 coup d'état because she considered it to be "a biased view of history."

Ginzburg was denounced as a homophobe for her claims during a 2008 parliamentary debate that homosexuals "have a disability for having children" and are "a capricious minority", but the National Institute Against Discrimination, Xenophobia and Racism (INADI) did not consider this complaint valid. As a member of the "Federal Proposal" coalition in the lower house, she belonged to a bloc that voted against civil unions, a law passed in December 2002 that legalized "the union freely formed by two people regardless of their sex."

She expressed her opposition to the Audiovisual Communication Services Law in 2009.

She also opposed a compulsory DNA extraction project to establish the identities of children of disappeared persons, arguing that it would violate the Pact of San José, the 5th article of which argues that everyone has the right to have their physical, mental, and moral integrity respected. In article 11, point 1, it expresses that every person has a right to the recognition of their dignity, and in point 2, that no one can be subjected to abusive interference in their private life or in their home.

Before the project was approved, while articulating her position on these premises in November 2009, Ginzburg was interrupted from the visitor's gallery by human rights activists, including the president of the Grandmothers of the Plaza de Mayo, Estela de Carlotto, who shouted demands that she be quiet. She responded that "...this is fascism. Victims have no more rights just because they are victims."
