= Alfredo Atanasof =

Argentine politician (born 1949)

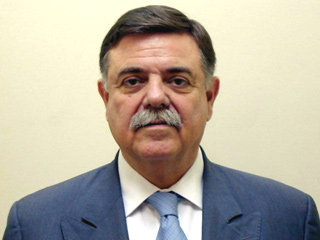
Alfredo Atanasof.

Alfredo Néstor Atanasof (born 24 November 1949) is an Argentine politician, who was National Deputy for Buenos Aires district during three terms 2009–2013, 2003-2007 and 1995–2002. He also served as Chief of the Cabinet of Ministers of Argentina and Minister of Labour during the presidency of Eduardo Duhalde in 2002.

In January 2020, he was designated by president Alberto Fernández as Argentine ambassador to Bulgaria.

He belongs to the Justicialist Party. He was born in La Plata and started his career as a trade unionist in Mar del Plata.
