= Daniel Katz (politician) =

Argentine politician (born 1961)

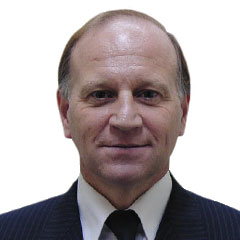
Daniel Katz

Victor Daniel Katz Jora known as Daniel Katz born in 1961, is an Argentine politician. He is a member of the Argentine Chamber of Deputies. He previously served as high-profile mayor of the city and beach resort of Mar del Plata in Buenos Aires Province.

Katz trained as an architect at the Universidad Nacional de Mar del Plata, where he later served as the Secretary General. He was elected a Mar del Plata councilor in 1995 and re-elected in 1999. He was elected Mayor of Mar del Plata (and the surrounding General Pueyrredón Partido) in 2003.

Katz was a senior member of the Radical Civic Union but became a leading supporter of Peronist President Néstor Kirchner. In the 2007 elections, he was placed second on the list of Kirchner's Front for Victory slate of candidates for national deputies for the Province of Buenos Aires. He was elected and took office in December 2007. He is currently a member and leader of the Consenso Federal party block. He leads his party in the Argentine Chamber of Deputies.
