= Carlos Kunkel =

Argentine lawyer and politician

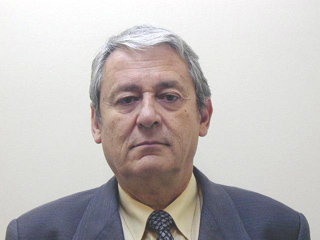
Carlos Kunkel

Carlos Kunkel (born 6 November 1945) is an Argentine lawyer and politician. He was part of the Montoneros organization, and was a national deputy from 2005 to 2017 for the Front for Victory - PJ. He was head of the Peronist Youth in the city of La Plata in the 1970s.
