= Plural Consensus =

Plural Consensus Concertación Plural
- Leader: Cristina Fernández de Kirchner
- Founded: 2006
- Dissolved: 2008
- Headquarters: Buenos Aires, Argentina
- Ideology: Peronism; Social democracy Radicalism; Christian democracy
- Political position: Center-left to left-wing
- Colours: Blue, White

Plural Consensus (Spanish: Concertación Plural) was a center-left Kirchnerist electoral alliance in Argentina acting as a political bloc in the Argentine Senate and elsewhere.

The coalition is largely made up of members of the Radical Civic Union, a group of smaller parties and dissident Socialist Party members who support the governing Peronists led by President Cristina Fernández de Kirchner. Former President Néstor Kirchner proposed the coalition as a new centre-left force in Argentine politics. The smaller parties originally included the Broad Front, the Victory Party, the Intransigent Party and the Christian Democratic Party.

The leading former Radical supporting the Kirchners was Julio Cobos, who was elected vice president. Having been expelled from the Radicals, he set up his own party, which eventually settled on the name ConFe (Federal Consensus). Formally, the bloc's two senators are Senator Dora Sánchez of Corrientes Province and Pablo Verani of Río Negro Province, both former Radicals. Other leading members of the concertation, often termed 'Radicales K', are governors Miguel Saiz, Gerardo Zamora and Arturo Colombi and deputies such as Hugo Nelson Prieto. In the Chamber of Deputies, a similar bloc of five deputies named 'Of the Concertation' (de la Concertación) exists, led by Prieto.

The 'Plural Consensus' tag has been widely used in the media to describe the non-Justicialist elements of the ruling coalition. By the time plans were advanced in formalising the coalition, disenchantment and defections had set in. In 2008, Kirchner began to form plans to take the leadership of the Justicialist Party and reach accommodation with those Justicialists who have opposed him, particularly the backers of Roberto Lavagna. This 'normalization' of Peronist politics left some Kirchner supporters outside Justicialist ranks uneasy, in addition to the government's tough line in the conflict with the agricultural sector. Some elements of the coalition began to peel away, notably Cobos, who used his casting vote against the moves in the agricultural sector in the Senate and has since been shunned by the Kirchners.

The Radical leadership began preparations to reach out to the Radicales K. In April 2009, the Radicals agreed to allow Cobos to rejoin at the end of his term as vice-president, and ConFe is lining up agreements with them and the Civic Coalition for the June elections.
