= Omar De Marchi =

Argentine politician

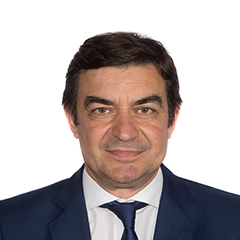

First Vice President of the Chamber of Deputies
- In office 10 December 2020 – 10 December 2023
- President: Sergio Massa; Cecilia Moreau
- Preceded by: Álvaro González
- Succeeded by: Cecilia Moreau

National Deputy
- In office 10 December 2020 – 10 December 2023
- Constituency: Mendoza
- In office 10 December 2005 – 10 December 2013
- Constituency: Mendoza

Mayor of Luján de Cuyo
- In office 10 December 2015 – 6 December 2019
- Preceded by: Carlos López Puelles
- Succeeded by: Sebastián Bragagnolo
- In office 10 December 1999 – 10 December 2005
- Preceded by: Luis Humberto Carral
- Succeeded by: Omar Parisi

Personal details
- Born: 28 May 1966 (age 60) Luján de Cuyo, Argentina
- Party: Democratic Party (1993–2013); Republican Proposal (since 2013)
- Other political affiliations: Juntos por el Cambio (since 2015)
- Education: National University of Córdoba

Omar Bruno De Marchi (born 28 May 1966) is an Argentine lawyer and politician. He served as a National Deputy elected in Mendoza Province on two occasions, from 2005 to 2013 and later from 2019 to 2023.

De Marchi previously served as intendente (mayor) of Luján de Cuyo on two occasions, from 2015 to 2019 and from 1999 to 2005. He is the leader of PRO in Mendoza and first vice president of the Chamber of Deputies.

== Early life and career ==
De Marchi was born on 28 May 1966 in Luján de Cuyo, Mendoza Province. He studied law at the National University of Córdoba, graduating in 1991, and has a master's degree in Business Administration from Universidad Francisco de Vitoria. He is married and has two children.

== Political career ==
De Marchi was originally a member of the Democratic Party of Mendoza. He was elected to the mayoralty of his hometown in 1993 and served two terms until 2005. In 2005, De Marchi was elected to the Argentine Chamber of Deputies on the PD–Recreate for Growth list. He was re-elected in 2009, this time as part of the PRO Union alliance, a precursor of Republican Proposal.

In 2015, De Marchi was elected once again as mayor of Luján de Cuyo.

In 2019, De Marchi ran for a seat in the Argentine Chamber of Deputies as the third candidate in the Cambia Mendoza list; the list received 52.44% of the vote and De Marchi was elected. In 2020, De Marchi was elected First Vice President of the Chamber of Deputies.
