= Julián Obiglio =

Argentine politician (born 1976)

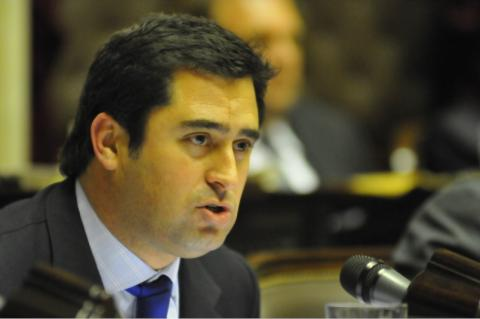
Julian Obiglio

Julián Martín Obiglio (born 1976 in Buenos Aires, Argentina), is a lawyer and former national deputy for the center-right Republican Proposal (PRO) party representing the City of Buenos Aires in the Argentine Chamber of Deputies (lower house). At 33 years, he became one of the youngest deputies in the chamber.

He is a former fellow of the Master in Public Policy at the FAES (Foundation for Social Studies and Analysis), a Spanish think tank linked with the right-wing Spanish People's Party. His work has included participation in various publications, including "Latin America, An Agenda for Freedom" (FAES, 2007, Madrid).
