= Daniel Agustín Brue =

Argentine politician

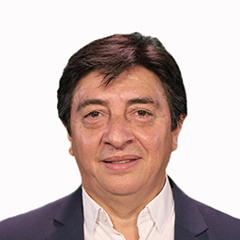

Member of the Chamber of Deputies of Argentina
- Incumbent
- Assumed office 10 December 2019
- Constituency: Santiago del Estero

Personal details
- Born: 28 December 1964 (age 61)
- Party: Frente de Todos
- Education: National University of Tucumán

Daniel Agustín Brue is an Argentine politician who is a member of the Chamber of Deputies of Argentina.

== Biography ==
Brue graduated from the National University of Tucumán with a degree in architecture. He was elected in 2021.
