= Margarita Ferrá de Bartol =

Argentine politician (1935–2013)

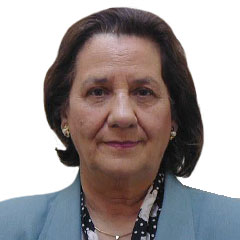
Margarita Ferrá de Bartol

Margarita Ferrá de Bartol (12 July 1935 – 11 October 2013) was an Argentine politician.

She was born in the Ullum Department, at the San Juan Province. She was minister of education of the prince in three periods: 1973–1975, 1991–1992 and 2006–2007. She became national deputy (representative) for the Front for Victory in the 2009 legislative election. Most of her proposed bills in the Congress were related to education.

She died on October 11, 2013, during a helicopter crash. The governor of San Juan, José Luis Gioja, and fellow deputy (provincial representative) Daniel Tomas, who were also in the helicopter, were hospitalized but survived to their wounds but survived.
