= Gerónimo Vargas Aignasse =

Argentine politician

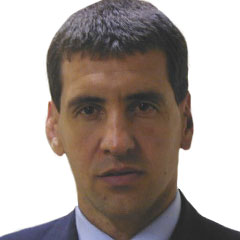
Gerónimo Vargas Aignasse

Gerónimo Vargas Aignasse (born 18 July 1970) is an Argentine politician and Front for Victory member of the Argentine Chamber of Deputies, representing Tucumán Province. He is the son of disappeared Peronist physicist and legislator Guillermo Vargas Aignasse.

== Legislative task ==
He was President of the Committee on Constitutional Affairs of the Honourable Legislature of Tucumán in the period 1999-2003. President of the Committee on Petitions, Powers and Regulations of the Tucumán Legislature in the 2007-2011 period. And he joined the Security and Justice Commission of the Honourable Legislature of Tucumán in the period 2011-2015. He was also a national deputy.

In his current period 2019-2023 he holds the position of First Vice President of the Honourable Legislature of Tucumán; He is the President of the Security and Justice Commission of the Honorable Lesgislature of Tucumán; President of the Environment Commission of the Honorable Legislature of Tucumán; Regular Director of the CAM (Advisory Council of the Magistracy)

== Sources ==
- Presentó un proyecto contra el plagio, que beneficiaba a distintos sectores de la sociedad "
