= Miguel Giubergia =

Argentine politician (1953–2020)

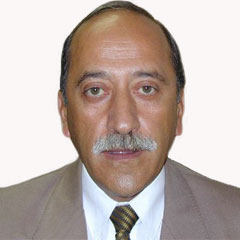

National Deputy
- In office 10 December 1999 – 10 December 2011
- Constituency: Jujuy Province

Personal details
- Born: Miguel Ángel Giubergia; 17 April 1953 San Antonio, Jujuy, Argentina
- Died: 8 October 2020 (aged 67) Palpalá, Jujuy, Argentina
- Party: Radical Civic Union

Miguel Ángel Giubergia (17 April 1953 – 8 October 2020) was an Argentine politician who served as a Deputy for the Radical Civic Union from 1999 to 2011.

== Life and career ==
Giubergia was born on 17 April 1953, in San Antonio, Jujuy. He studied law at the National University of Córdoba and shortly afterwards returned to his home province. In 1985, he became a member of the national committee of the Radical Civic Union. In the 1991 Argentine provincial elections he was elected to the Legislature of Jujuy (es). He was re-elected in 1995 and served until 1999, when he was elected to the National Chamber of Deputies for Jujuy Province. Giubergia served there from 10 December 1999 until 10 December 2011.

Giubergia later served as a provincial director of the Ente Nacional de Comunicaciones. He died from COVID-19 at a clinic in Palpalá on 8 October 2020, aged 67, during the COVID-19 pandemic in Argentina.
