= Hugo Perié =

Argentine politician (1944–2011)

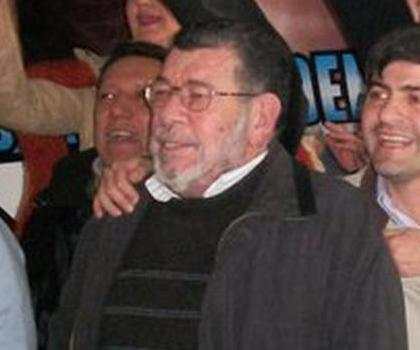
Perié in 2010

Hugo Perié (18 January 1944 – 15 August 2011) was an Argentine politician and member of the legislature from the year 2003 until his death on the 15 August 2011. Perié died of lung disease aged 67. He was a member of the Front for Victory, and its former component, the Justicialist Party.
