= Marcela Virginia Rodríguez =

Argentine politician and political scientist

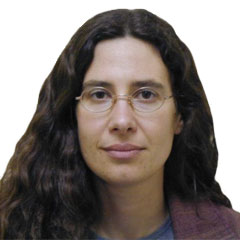

National Deputy
- In office 10 December 2001 – 10 December 2013
- Constituency: Buenos Aires Province

Personal details
- Born: 23 February 1965 (age 61) Buenos Aires, Argentina
- Party: Civic Coalition ARI (2001–2011)
- Other political affiliations: Civic Coalition (2007–2011); Social and Civic Agreement (2009–2011)

Marcela Virginia Rodríguez (born 23 February 1965) is an Argentine politician who served as National Deputy for Buenos Aires Province from 2001 to 2013. She was a member of the Civic Coalition ARI from the party's foundation up to 2011, when she left in disagreement with leader and founder Elisa Carrio's stance on gay marriage.

== Early life and career ==
Rodríguez was born in Buenos Aires on 23 February 1965. She studied law at the University of Buenos Aires and counts with a Master of Law degree from Yale University. She worked as a researcher at the World Bank and was later appointed as co-director of the Women's Centre at Vicente López Partido.

== Political career ==
In the 2001 legislative election, Rodríguez ran for a seat in the Argentine Chamber of Deputies as part of the Argentinos por una República de Iguales list in Buenos Aires Province. She was later re-elected in 2005 for the Civic Coalition and in 2009 for the Social and Civic Agreement list.

From 2002 to 2006 she was the Chamber of Deputies representative to the Council of Magistracy of the Nation. Later, from 2007 to 2009, she was Third Vice President of the Chamber.

Openly lesbian, Rodríguez voted in favor of the legalization of same-sex marriage in 2010, and later backed the progressive 2012 Gender Identity Bill. Her votes in favor of these bills put her at odds with Civic Coalition leader and founder Elisa Carrió, who voted against gay marriage and excused herself by saying she "had a lesbian friend", referring to Rodríguez. This was later said to be Rodríguez's reason for leaving the party and forming her own parliamentary group.

Her mandate as deputy ended in 2013; she did not seek re-election. Since then she has taught classes at the University of Buenos Aires and Universidad de Palermo.
