= Héctor Recalde =

Argentine politician (1938–2024)

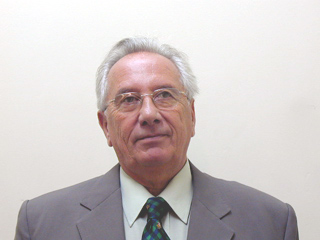
- Recalde in 2010

National Deputy
- In office 10 December 2005 – 10 December 2017
- Constituency: Buenos Aires

Councillor of Magistracy
- In office 12 November 2014 – 12 July 2016
- Appointed by: Chamber of Deputies

Personal details
- Born: 28 May 1938 Buenos Aires, Argentina
- Died: 9 December 2024 (aged 86)
- Party: Justicialist Party
- Other political affiliations: Front for Victory (2003–2017)
- Education: University of Buenos Aires

Héctor Recalde (28 May 1938 – 9 December 2024) was an Argentine lawyer and politician who specialized in labor and political law. He was a national deputy for Buenos Aires province between 2005 and 2017. He was the spokesman for the Front for Victory in the Chamber of Deputies.

== Early life and education ==
Born into a working-class family in the Buenos Aires neighborhood of Colegiales, Recalde graduated from the University of Buenos Aires in 1961. He was a Peronist since his youth.

== Career ==
=== Academic career ===
At the University of Buenos Aires, Recalde served for many years as a Consulting Professor in the Faculty of Social Sciences, as a Professor of Law in the Faculty of Law, and as a Tenured Professor of Labor Administrative Law in the Faculty of Social Sciences.

=== Political and union activities ===
From 1964, Recalde was a lawyer for the General Confederation of Labor (CGT), where he was an advisor to the textile leader Andrés Framini. Throughout his career, he also served as a legal advisor to various trade union organizations in Argentina and had also been associated with CGT-Brazil, the country's second-largest labor-union federation.

After a coup d'état overthrew Isabel Perón on 24 March 1976, Recalde went into exile for a year in Uruguay. Returning to Argentina, he was in charge of writing the portion of the Justicialist Party’s election program relating to labor issues. Later, when CGT leader Saúl Ubaldini ran for governor of the province of Buenos Aires, Recalde headed the accompanying list of legislative candidates.

During the attempted military coup of 1987, Recalde was commissioned to draft the CGT resolution stating that, if the coup continued, the CGT would call a general strike in defense of republican institutions.

When Hugo Moyano became general secretary of the CGT in 2004, Recalde was named its head legal adviser.

=== National deputy (2005–2017) ===
In 2005, running as a candidate of the Justicialist Party in the province of Buenos Aires, he won a seat in the National Congress, taking office on 10 December of that year. He won re-election five times. In 2009, he and Ernesto Sanz were named by fellow deputies, congressional staffers, advisors, and the writers and readers of Parliamentary Weekly as the most outstanding legislators of the year.

In 2012, a conflict over a new labor law of which Moyano disapproved led him to accuse Recalde of treating workers with disrespect, permanently ending the friendship between Recalde and Moyano.

Moyano’s accusation notwithstanding, Recalde introduced many bills aimed at improving workers’ lives. He also proposed the repeal of regulations that the last military dictatorship had imposed on media and financial enterprises and supported the re-nationalization of firms that had been privatized during the 1990s. He also advocated for the re-nationalization of the social security system. During his later years in Congress, Recalde called for profit participation by employees of private firms.

While serving in Congress, Recalde served as president of the Labor Legislation Commission and was a member of the Commissions for the Analysis and Monitoring of Tax and Social-Security Regulations; Economy; Justice; Criminal Legislation; and Petitions, Powers and Regulations.

=== Memberships ===
In 2003 Recalde was elected as member of the Commission for the Legal Analysis of Social Protest, a subdivision of the Human Rights Secretariat, part of the Ministry of Justice, Security and Human Rights of the Argentine Republic. He also served as president of the Labor Law Commission of the Buenos Aires Bar Association and as a member of the Advisory Council of the Labor Lawyers Association.

=== Books ===
Recalde wrote many legal articles and the following books:

- Reforma Laboral – Flexibilidad sin Empleo (1994)
- Política Laboral 1989-1995 (1995; 1996)
- Un caso judicial, Asignaciones – Vales alimentarios (1996)
- Encuadramiento sindical y convencional (1996)
- Crónica de una ley negociada: Ley 25.250, de reforma laboral (2000)
- Política Laboral Ilustrada (2001)
- La tercera Década Infame (2003)

He is also the co-author of these works:

- Normalización sindical - Régimen electoral ley 23.071 (1984)
- La negociación colectiva (1989)
- Nuevo régimen de asociaciones sindicales
- Dos leyes regresivas. Análisis - crítica (1999)

== Personal life and death ==
Recalde was the father of three children. Mariano was president of Aerolíneas Argentinas and a National Senator for Buenos Aires; Leandro, like his father, is a labor lawyer; Mora is an actress.

Recalde died on 9 December 2024, at the age of 86.
