= Civic Front of Córdoba =

Civic Front of Córdoba Frente Cívico de Córdoba
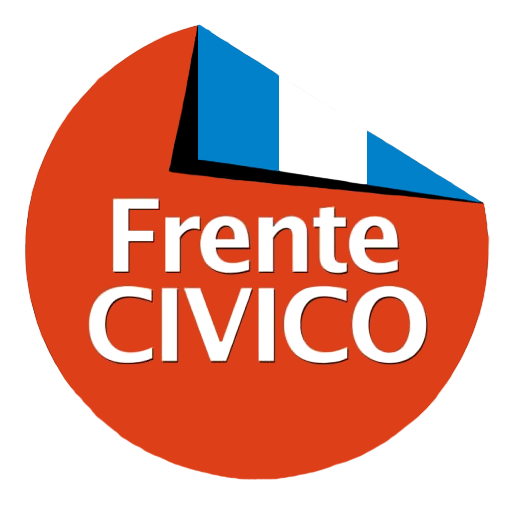
- Leader: Luis Juez
- President: Ernesto Félix Martínez
- Founded: 2003
- Headquarters: Córdoba, Argentina
- Ideology: Social democracy Progressivism; Anti-corruption; Regionalism
- Political position: Center-left
- National affiliation: Cambiemos
- Seats in the Chamber of Deputies: 1 / 257
- Seats in the Senate: 1 / 72
- Seats in the Córdoba Legislature: 5 / 70

The Civic Front of Córdoba (Spanish: Frente Cívico de Córdoba), formerly known as the New Party against Corruption, for Honesty and Transparence (Spanish: Partido Nuevo contra la Corrupción, por la Honestidad y la Transparencia) is a provincial political party in Córdoba, Argentina.

Since 2015, Luis Juez reiterated his support for Mauricio Macri and Cambiemos, and rejected an agreement with Sergio Massa.

Currently, its representatives in Argentine Congress, Luis Juez and Ernesto Feliz Martínez, are part of the PRO bloc, within the Juntos por el Cambio inter-bloc.
