= List of Argentine senators, 2009–2011 =

This is a list of members of the Argentine Senate from 10 December 2009 to 9 December 2011.

== Composition ==
as of 9 December 2011

| Bloc | Seats | Leader |
|---|---|---|
| Front for Victory–PJ | 32 | Miguel Ángel Pichetto |
| Radical Civic Union | 13 | Gerardo Morales |
| Civic Front of Córdoba | 2 | Luis Juez |
| Civic and Social Front of Catamarca | 2 | Oscar Castillo |
| Civic Front for Santiago | 2 | Ada Itúrrez de Cappellini |
| Federal Santa Fe | 2 | Carlos Reutemann |
| La Pampa Justicialist | 2 | Carlos Verna |
| October 8th Justicialist | 2 | Juan Carlos Romero |
| San Luis Justicialist | 2 | Liliana Negre de Alonso |
| New Encounter | 2 | María Rosa Díaz |
| Civic Coalition | 1 | María Eugenia Estenssoro |
| Federal Buenos Aires Project | 1 | Samuel Cabanchik |
| Federalism and Liberty | 1 | Carlos Saúl Menem |
| Front for All | 1 | José María Roldán |
| GEN | 1 | Jaime Linares |
| Labour and Dignity | 1 | Gabriela Di Perna |
| Liberal Party of Corrientes | 1 | Josefina Meabe |
| Neuquén People's Movement | 1 | Horacio Lores |
| Production and Labour | 1 | Roberto Basualdo |
| Salta Renewal Party | 1 | Juan Agustín Pérez Alsina |
| Socialist Party | 1 | Rubén Giustiniani |
Source: senado.gov.ar (archive)

== Senate leadership ==
| Title | Officeholder | Bloc | Province |
|---|---|---|---|
| President of the Senate (Note: Ex officio as Vice President of Argentina.) | Julio Cobos | Front for Victory–UCR | Mendoza |
| Provisional President | José Pampuro | Front for Victory–PJ | Buenos Aires Province |
| Vice President | Juan Carlos Marino | Radical Civic Union | La Pampa |
| First Vice President | Juan Carlos Romero | October 8th Justicialist | Salta |
| Second Vice President | Roberto Basualdo | Production and Labour | San Juan |

== Election cycles ==
| Election | Term | |
| Election | Start | End |
|---|---|---|
| 2005 | 10 December 2005 | 9 December 2011 |
| 2007 | 10 December 2007 | 9 December 2013 |
| 2009 | 10 December 2009 | 9 December 2015 |

== List of senators ==
| Province | Senator | Party | Term | |
| Province | Senator | Party | From | To |
|---|---|---|---|---|
| Buenos Aires Province | Eric Calcagno y Maillmann | Front for Victory–PJ | 2007 (Note: Since 10 December 2007. Replaced Cristina Fernández de Kirchner.) | 2011 |
| Buenos Aires Province | Hilda Beatriz González de Duhalde | Justicialist Front | 2005 | 2011 |
| Buenos Aires Province | José Juan Bautista Pampuro | Front for Victory–PJ | 2005 | 2011 |
| Buenos Aires | Samuel Manuel Cabanchik | Federal Buenos Aires Project | 2007 | 2013 |
| Buenos Aires | María Eugenia Estenssoro | Civic Coalition | 2007 | 2013 |
| Buenos Aires | Daniel Fernando Filmus | Front for Victory–PJ | 2007 | 2013 |
| Catamarca | Lucía Benigna Corpacci | Front for Victory–PJ | 2009 | 2011 (Note: Resigned in December 2011 to take office as governor of Catamarca.) |
| Catamarca | Oscar Aníbal Castillo | Civic and Social Front of Catamarca | 2009 | 2015 |
| Catamarca | Blanca María del Valle Monllau | Civic and Social Front of Catamarca | 2009 | 2015 |
| Chaco | Fabio Darío Biancalani | Front for Victory–PJ | 2007 | 2013 |
| Chaco | Elena Mercedes Corregido | Front for Victory–PJ | 2007 | 2013 |
| Chaco | Roy Abelardo Nikisch | Radical Civic Union | 2007 | 2013 |
| Chubut | Marcelo Alejandro Horacio Guinle | Front for Victory–PJ | 2009 | 2015 |
| Chubut | Mario Jorge Cimadevilla | Radical Civic Union | 2009 | 2015 |
| Chubut | Graciela Di Perna | Labour and Dignity | 2009 | 2015 |
| Córdoba | Ramón Javier Mestre | Radical Civic Union | 2009 | 2011 (Note: Resigned on 10 December 2011 to take office as mayor of Córdoba. Replaced by Marta Borello.) |
| Córdoba | Luis Alberto Juez | Civic Front of Córdoba | 2009 | 2015 |
| Córdoba | Norma Elena Morandini | Civic Front of Córdoba | 2009 | 2015 |
| Corrientes | Eugenio Justiniano Artaza | Radical Civic Union | 2009 | 2015 |
| Corrientes | Josefina Angélica Meabe | Liberal Party of Corrientes | 2009 | 2015 |
| Corrientes | José María Roldán | Front for All | 2009 | 2015 |
| Entre Ríos | Pedro Guillermo Ángel Guastavino | Front for Victory–PJ | 2007 | 2013 |
| Entre Ríos | Blanca Inés Osuna | Front for Victory–PJ | 2007 | 2011 (Note: Resigned on 10 December 2011 to take office as mayor of Paraná.) |
| Entre Ríos | Arturo Vera | Radical Civic Union | 2007 | 2013 |
| Formosa | Adriana Raquel Bortolozzi | Front for Victory–PJ | 2005 | 2011 |
| Formosa | José Miguel Ángel Mayans | Front for Victory–PJ | 2005 | 2011 |
| Formosa | Luis Carlos Petcoff Naidenoff | Radical Civic Union | 2005 | 2011 |
| Jujuy | Guillermo Raúl Jenefes | Front for Victory–PJ | 2005 | 2011 |
| Jujuy | Liliana Beatriz Fellner | Front for Victory–PJ | 2005 | 2011 |
| Jujuy | Gerardo Rubén Morales | Radical Civic Union | 2005 | 2011 |
| La Pampa | María de los Ángeles Higonet | La Pampa Justicialist | 2009 | 2015 |
| La Pampa | Carlos Alberto Verna | La Pampa Justicialist | 2009 | 2015 |
| La Pampa | Juan Carlos Marino | Radical Civic Union | 2009 | 2015 |
| La Rioja | Ada Mercedes Maza | Front for Victory–PJ | 2005 | 2011 |
| La Rioja | Carlos Saúl Menem | Federalism and Liberty | 2005 | 2011 |
| La Rioja | Teresita Quintela | Front for Victory–PJ | 2005 | 2011 |
| Mendoza | Rolando Adolfo Bermejo | Front for Victory–PJ | 2009 | 2015 |
| Mendoza | Laura Gisela Montero | Radical Civic Union | 2009 | 2015 |
| Mendoza | Ernesto Sanz | Radical Civic Union | 2009 | 2015 |
| Misiones | Eduardo Enrique Torres | Front for Victory–PJ | 2007 (Note: Since 10 December 2007. Replaced Maurice Closs.) | 2011 |
| Misiones | Luis Alberto Viana | Front for Victory–PJ | 2005 | 2011 |
| Misiones | Élida María Vigo | Front for Victory–PJ | 2005 | 2011 |
| Neuquén | Marcelo Jorge Fuentes | Front for Victory–PJ | 2007 | 2013 |
| Neuquén | Horacio Lores | Neuquén People's Movement | 2007 | 2013 |
| Neuquén | Nanci María Agustina Parrilli | Front for Victory–PJ | 2007 | 2013 |
| Río Negro | María José Bongiorno | Front for Victory–PJ | 2007 | 2013 |
| Río Negro | Miguel Ángel Pichetto | Front for Victory–PJ | 2007 | 2013 |
| Río Negro | Pablo Federico Verani | Radical Civic Union | 2007 | 2013 (Note: Died on 25 September 2013.) |
| Salta | Sonia Margarita Escudero | October 8th Justicialist | 2007 | 2013 |
| Salta | Juan Agustín Pérez Alsina | Salta Renewal Party | 2007 | 2013 |
| Salta | Juan Carlos Romero | October 8th Justicialist | 2007 | 2013 |
| San Juan | Roberto Gustavo Basualdo | Production and Labour | 2005 | 2011 |
| San Juan | César Ambrosio Gioja | Front for Victory–PJ | 2005 | 2011 |
| San Juan | Marina Raquel Riofrío | Front for Victory–PJ | 2005 | 2011 |
| San Luis | Liliana Negre de Alonso | San Luis Justicialist | 2005 | 2011 |
| San Luis | Daniel Raúl Pérsico | Front for Victory–PJ | 2005 | 2011 |
| San Luis | Adolfo Rodríguez Saá | San Luis Justicialist | 2005 | 2011 |
| Santa Cruz | Jorge Esteban Banicevich | Front for Victory–PJ | 2009 (Note: Since 13 May 2009. Replaced Judith Forstmann.) | 2011 |
| Santa Cruz | Nicolás Alejandro Fernández | Front for Victory–PJ | 2005 | 2011 |
| Santa Cruz | Alfredo Anselmo Martínez | Radical Civic Union | 2005 | 2011 |
| Santa Fe | Rubén Héctor Giustiniani | Socialist Party | 2009 | 2015 |
| Santa Fe | Roxana Itatí Latorre | Federal Santa Fe | 2009 | 2015 |
| Santa Fe | Carlos Alberto Reutemann | Federal Santa Fe | 2009 | 2015 |
| Santiago del Estero | Ana María Corradi de Beltrán | Front for Victory–PJ | 2007 | 2013 |
| Santiago del Estero | Ada Rosa del Valle Itúrrez de Cappellini | Civic Front for Santiago | 2007 | 2013 |
| Santiago del Estero | Emilio Alberto Rached | Civic Front for Santiago | 2007 | 2013 |
| Tierra del Fuego | Mario Jorge Colazo | Front for Victory–PJ | 2007 | 2013 |
| Tierra del Fuego | María Rosa Díaz | New Encounter | 2007 | 2013 |
| Tierra del Fuego | Osvaldo Ramón López | New Encounter | 2011 (Note: Since 27 July 2011. Replaced José Carlos Martínez.) | 2013 |
| Tierra del Fuego | José Carlos Martínez | New Encounter | 2011 | 2013 (Note: Died on 27 July 2011.) |
| Tucumán | José Manuel Cano | Radical Civic Union | 2009 | 2013 (Note: Until 10 December 2013.) |
| Tucumán | Sergio Francisco Mansilla | Front for Victory–PJ | 2009 | 2015 |
| Tucumán | Beatriz Liliana Rojkés de Alperovich | Front for Victory–PJ | 2009 | 2015 |
