= List of Argentine senators, 2011–2013 =

This is a list of members of the Argentine Senate from 10 December 2011 to 9 December 2013.

== Composition ==
as of 9 December 2013

Bloc	Seats	Leader
Front for Victory–PJ	32	Miguel Ángel Pichetto
Radical Civic Union	14	Gerardo Morales
Civic Front of Córdoba	2	Luis Juez
Civic and Social Front of Catamarca	2	Oscar Castillo
La Pampa Justicialist	2	Carlos Verna
October 8th Justicialist	2	Juan Carlos Romero
San Luis Justicialist	2	Liliana Negre de Alonso
New Encounter	2	María Rosa Díaz
Civic Coalition	1	María Eugenia Estenssoro
Civic Front for Santiago	1	Ada Itúrrez de Cappellini
Federal Buenos Aires Project	1	Samuel Cabanchik
Federal Santa Fe	1	Carlos Reutemann
Federalism and Liberty	1	Carlos Saúl Menem
Front for All	1	José María Roldán
GEN	1	Jaime Linares
Labour and Dignity	1	Gabriela Di Perna
Liberal Party of Corrientes	1	Josefina Meabe
Neuquén People's Movement	1	Horacio Lores
Production and Labour	1	Roberto Basualdo
Santa Fe Federalism	1	Roxana Latorre
Salta Renewal Party	1	Juan Agustín Pérez Alsina
Socialist Party	1	Rubén Giustiniani
Source: senado.gov.ar (archive)

== Senate leadership ==
Title	Officeholder	Bloc	Province
President of the Senate (Note: Ex officio as Vice President of Argentina.)	Amado Boudou	Front for Victory–PJ	Autonomous City of Buenos Aires
Provisional President	Beatriz Rojkés de Alperovich	Front for Victory–PJ	Tucumán
Vice President	Juan Carlos Marino	Radical Civic Union	La Pampa
First Vice President	Luis Juez	Civic Front of Córdoba	Córdoba
Second Vice President	Juan Carlos Romero	October 8th Justicialist	Salta

== Election cycles ==
Election	Term	
Election	Start	End
2007	10 December 2007	9 December 2013
2009	10 December 2009	9 December 2015
2011	10 December 2011	9 December 2017

== List of senators ==
Province	Senator	Party	Term	
Province	Senator	Party	From	To
Buenos Aires Province	Aníbal Domingo Fernández	Front for Victory–PJ	2011	2017
Buenos Aires Province	María Laura Leguizamón	Front for Victory–PJ	2011	2017
Buenos Aires Province	Jaime Linares	GEN	2011	2017
Buenos Aires	Samuel Manuel Cabanchik	Federal Buenos Aires Project	2007	2013
Buenos Aires	María Eugenia Estenssoro	Civic Coalition	2007	2013
Buenos Aires	Daniel Fernando Filmus	Front for Victory–PJ	2007	2013
Catamarca	Inés Imelda Blas	Front for Victory–PJ	2011 (Note: Since 1 December 2011. Replaced Lucía Corpacci.)	2015
Catamarca	Oscar Aníbal Castillo	Civic and Social Front of Catamarca	2009	2015
Catamarca	Blanca María del Valle Monllau	Civic and Social Front of Catamarca	2009	2015
Chaco	Fabio Darío Biancalani	Front for Victory–PJ	2007	2013
Chaco	Elena Mercedes Corregido	Front for Victory–PJ	2007	2013
Chaco	Roy Abelardo Nikisch	Radical Civic Union	2007	2013
Chubut	Marcelo Alejandro Horacio Guinle	Front for Victory–PJ	2009	2015
Chubut	Mario Jorge Cimadevilla	Radical Civic Union	2009	2015
Chubut	Graciela Di Perna	Labour and Dignity	2009	2015
Córdoba	Marta Borello	Radical Civic Union	2011 (Note: Since 10 December 2011. Replaced Ramón Javier Mestre.)	2015
Córdoba	Luis Alberto Juez	Civic Front of Córdoba	2009	2015
Córdoba	Norma Elena Morandini	Civic Front of Córdoba	2009	2015
Corrientes	Eugenio Justiniano Artaza	Radical Civic Union	2009	2015
Corrientes	Josefina Angélica Meabe	Liberal Party of Corrientes	2009	2015
Corrientes	José María Roldán	Front for All	2009	2015
Entre Ríos	Pedro Guillermo Ángel Guastavino	Front for Victory–PJ	2007	2013
Entre Ríos	Elsa Beatriz Ruiz Díaz	Front for Victory–PJ	2011 (Note: Since 10 December 2011. Replaced Blanca Osuna.)	2013
Entre Ríos	Arturo Vera	Radical Civic Union	2007	2013
Formosa	María Graciela de la Rosa	Front for Victory–PJ	2011	2017
Formosa	José Miguel Ángel Mayans	Front for Victory–PJ	2011	2017
Formosa	Luis Carlos Petcoff Naidenoff	Radical Civic Union	2011	2017
Jujuy	Walter Basilio Barrionuevo	Front for Victory–PJ	2011	2017
Jujuy	Liliana Beatriz Fellner	Front for Victory–PJ	2011	2017
Jujuy	Gerardo Rubén Morales	Radical Civic Union	2011	2017
La Pampa	María de los Ángeles Higonet	La Pampa Justicialist	2009	2015
La Pampa	Carlos Alberto Verna	La Pampa Justicialist	2009	2015
La Pampa	Juan Carlos Marino	Radical Civic Union	2009	2015
La Rioja	Hilda Clelia Aguirre de Soria	Front for Victory–PJ	2011	2017
La Rioja	Mirtha María Teresita Luna	Front for Victory–PJ	2011	2017
La Rioja	Carlos Saúl Menem	Federalism and Liberty	2011	2017
Mendoza	Rolando Adolfo Bermejo	Front for Victory–PJ	2009	2015
Mendoza	Laura Gisela Montero	Radical Civic Union	2009	2015
Mendoza	Ernesto Sanz	Radical Civic Union	2009	2015
Misiones	Salvador Cabral	Front for Victory–PJ	2011	2017
Misiones	Sandra Daniela Giménez	Front for Victory–PJ	2011	2017
Misiones	Juan Manuel Irrazábal	Front for Victory–PJ	2011	2017
Neuquén	Marcelo Jorge Fuentes	Front for Victory–PJ	2007	2013
Neuquén	Horacio Lores	Neuquén People's Movement	2007	2013
Neuquén	Nanci María Agustina Parrilli	Front for Victory–PJ	2007	2013
Río Negro	María José Bongiorno	Front for Victory–PJ	2007	2013
Río Negro	Miguel Ángel Pichetto	Front for Victory–PJ	2007	2013
Río Negro	María Noemí Sosa	Radical Civic Union	2013 (Note: Since 9 October 2013. Replaced Pablo Verani.)	2013
Río Negro	Pablo Federico Verani	Radical Civic Union	2007	2013 (Note: Died on 25 September 2013.)
Salta	Sonia Margarita Escudero	October 8th Justicialist	2007	2013
Salta	Juan Agustín Pérez Alsina	Salta Renewal Party	2007	2013
Salta	Juan Carlos Romero	October 8th Justicialist	2007	2013
San Juan	Roberto Gustavo Basualdo	Production and Labour	2011	2017
San Juan	Ruperto Eduardo Godoy	Front for Victory–PJ	2011	2017
San Juan	Marina Raquel Riofrío	Front for Victory–PJ	2011	2017
San Luis	Liliana Negre de Alonso	San Luis Justicialist	2011	2017
San Luis	Daniel Raúl Pérsico	Front for Victory–PJ	2011	2017
San Luis	Adolfo Rodríguez Saá	San Luis Justicialist	2011	2017
Santa Cruz	Pablo Gerardo González	Front for Victory–PJ	2011	2017
Santa Cruz	María Ester Labado	Front for Victory–PJ	2011	2017
Santa Cruz	Alfredo Anselmo Martínez	Radical Civic Union	2011	2017
Santa Fe	Rubén Héctor Giustiniani	Socialist Party	2009	2015
Santa Fe	Roxana Itatí Latorre	Santa Fe Federalism	2009	2015
Santa Fe	Carlos Alberto Reutemann	Federal Santa Fe	2009	2015
Santiago del Estero	Ana María Corradi de Beltrán	Front for Victory–PJ	2007	2013
Santiago del Estero	Ada Rosa del Valle Itúrrez de Cappellini	Civic Front for Santiago	2007	2013
Santiago del Estero	Emilio Alberto Rached	Radical Civic Union	2007	2013
Tierra del Fuego	Mario Jorge Colazo	Front for Victory–PJ	2007	2013
Tierra del Fuego	María Rosa Díaz	New Encounter	2007	2013
Tierra del Fuego	Osvaldo Ramón López	New Encounter	2011 (Note: Since 27 July 2011. Replaced José Carlos Martínez.)	2013
Tucumán	José Manuel Cano	Radical Civic Union	2009	2013 (Note: Until 10 December 2013.)
Tucumán	Sergio Francisco Mansilla	Front for Victory–PJ	2009	2015
Tucumán	Beatriz Liliana Rojkés de Alperovich	Front for Victory–PJ	2009	2015
