= Same-sex marriage in Argentina =

Same-sex marriage has been legal in Argentina since July 22, 2010. Bills to legalize same-sex marriage were introduced to the National Congress in 2009 by deputies from the Socialist and New Encounter parties. Following much discussion, a unified bill passed the Chamber of Deputies on May 5, 2010, by a vote of 126 to 110, and the Senate on July 15 by 33 votes to 27. President Cristina Fernández de Kirchner signed the bill into law on July 21, and it went into effect the following day. Polling indicates that a majority of Argentines support the legal recognition of same-sex marriage. Argentina was the first country in South America and Latin America, the second in the Americas, the second in the Hispanic world, the second in the Southern Hemisphere and the tenth in the world to legalize same-sex marriage.

Civil unions providing some of the rights and benefits of marriage have been available nationwide since 2015. Before this, some jurisdictions had enacted civil union laws, including the Autonomous City of Buenos Aires and the province of Río Negro.

== Unregistered cohabitation ==
In December 2005, a judge in the province of Córdoba ordered that all prisons must authorize conjugal visits for gay prisoners and permit sexual relations between inmates who form relationships in prison. On August 19, 2008, the Government of Argentina announced that same-sex couples who had cohabited for over five years would be granted the right to collect their deceased partners' pensions. This marked the first nationwide recognition of unregistered cohabitation and rights for same-sex partners. Following this announcement, four major labor unions—representing teachers, commerce employees, executives, and air-transport personnel—extended National Security System medical benefits to employees' same-sex partners. These benefits are provided through a health care system jointly operated by the government and unions.

== Civil unions ==
In the first decade of the 21st century, civil unions (Spanish: unión civil or unión convivencial) were legalized in four jurisdictions in Argentina: the Autonomous City of Buenos Aires (2002), the province of Río Negro (2003), the city of Villa Carlos Paz (2007), and the city of Río Cuarto (2009). Civil unions provide some of the rights granted to married couples and can only be entered into by couples who have lived together for a given time, usually one or two years.

Civil unions were legalized nationwide on 1 August 2015 when the Civil and Commercial Code (Código Civil y Commercial), which replaced the former Civil Code of Argentina, came into effect. The Code was approved by Parliament in October 2014 and promulgated by President Fernández de Kirchner on October 7, 2014. Couples in civil unions have access to hospital visitation rights, and inheritance and pension rights, among other rights and benefits.

== Same-sex marriage ==
Recognition of same-sex unions in South America Marriage Other type of partnership Unrecognized Constitution limits marriage to opposite-sex couples Same-sex sexual activity illegal, though penalties not enforced

=== Legislative action ===
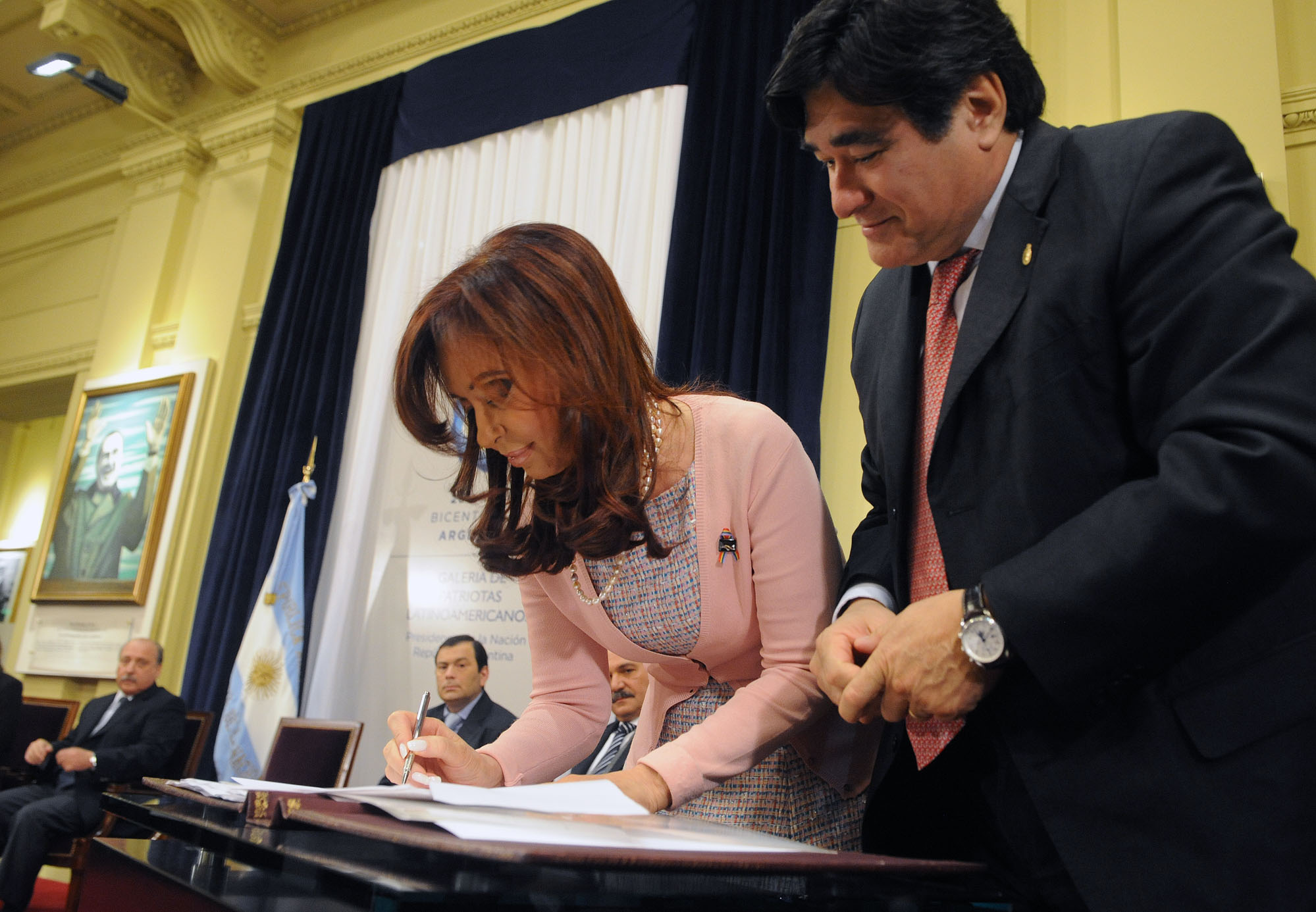
President Cristina Fernández de Kirchner promulgating the same-sex marriage bill, making Argentina the first Latin American country to legalise same-sex marriage, July 21, 2010

Two weeks before the 2009 mid-term elections, Justice Minister Aníbal Fernández said that he was in favor of starting a debate on the legalisation of same-sex marriage in the National Congress, adding that a gender-neutral law would "end discrimination", and that "many people [were] demanding it". Fernández also said that former President Néstor Kirchner, husband of President Cristina Fernández de Kirchner, supported having a wider discussion on same-sex marriage in the country. President Fernández de Kirchner's position on same-sex marriage was unknown at the time. Fernández said he was presently "working toward" presenting a draft law to Congress, and that his ministry had to first "evaluate all the different aspects of the issue". The draft bill was never presented to Congress. At this time, LGBT groups gradually won over members of the Chamber of Deputies to their cause, aided by the decentralized nature of congressional parties which allowed advocacy groups to post incremental gains.

In late 2009, the Argentine Congress considered two proposals, sponsored by Silvia Augsburger (Socialist Party) and Vilma Ibarra (New Encounter), to amend the Civil Code to permit same-sex marriages. Ibarra and Augsburger later agreed to merge their initiatives into a single draft law. On October 27, 2009, the same-sex marriage bill was debated in the Chamber of Deputies' General Law Committee and the Committee on Family, Women, Children and Youth. Ibarra expressed her desire to have same-sex marriage in Argentina approved by the end of 2009. Debate on the bill continued on November 5 and on November 10, before being postponed and resuming in March 2010. A survey taken at the time found that 70% of Argentines supported legalizing same-sex marriage.

On April 15, 2010, the Chamber of Deputies' General Law Committee and the Committee on Family, Women, Children and Youth recommended the legalization of same-sex marriage. On May 5, 2010, the Chamber of Deputies passed the same-sex marriage bill by a vote of 126 to 110. On July 6, the Senate's General Law Committee recommended rejection of the bill. The bill was originally scheduled to be voted on July 14. After a marathon session that extended into the early hours of the next day, the Senate passed the same-sex marriage bill by a vote of 33 to 27 on July 15. The bill was signed into law by President Cristina Fernández de Kirchner on July 21. It was published in the Boletín Oficial de la República Argentina on July 22 and took effect that same day. The law grants same-sex couples all the rights and responsibilities of marriage, including the right to adopt children. The first marriage was performed on July 30, 2010, between Miguel Ángel Calefato and José Luis Navarro in Frías.

5 May 2010 vote in the Chamber of Deputies
Party	Voted for	Voted against	Abstained	Absent (Did not vote)
G Front for Victory	46: María Acosta; Oscar Albrieu; Raúl Barrandeguy; Nora Bedano; María Bernal; Gloria Bidegain; Mariel Calchaquí; Remo Carlotto; María Chieno; Luis Cigogna; Diana Conti; Stella Córdoba; Viviana Damilano Grivarello; María de la Rosa; Juliana Di Tullio; Paulina Fiol; María García; Ruperto Godoy; Dante Gullo; Juan Irrazábal; Nestor Kirchner; Beatriz Korenfeld; Carlos Kunkel; María Leguizamón; Ermindo Llanos; Juan Lorges; Gustavo Marconato; Sandra Mendoza; Carlos Moreno; Carmen Nebreda; Juan Pais; Ariel Pasini; Hugo Perié; Julia Perié; María Pilatti Vergara; Francisco Plaini; Adriana Puiggrós; Héctor Recalde; Silvia Risko; Evaristo Rodríguez; Agustín Rossi; Alejandro Rossi; Rubén Sciutto; Adela Segarra; Gerónimo Vargas Aignasse; Mariano West	30: Hilda Aguirre; Germán Alfaro; Antonio Alizegui; Rosana Bertone; Graciela Caselles; Jorge Cejas; Alfredo Dato; José Díaz Bancalari; Patricia Fadel; Omar Félix; Luis Fernández Basualdo; Margarita Ferrá de Bartol; Miriam Gallardo; Graciela Giannettasio; Juan González; Nancy Gonzaléz; Dulce Granados; Jorge Landau; Stella Leverberg; Timoteo Llera; Rafael López; Dalmacio Mera; Antonio Morante; Alberto Paredes Urquiza; Guillermo Pereyra; Marta Quintero; Héctor Tomas; José Vilariño; Fernando Yarade; Alex Ziegler	–	10: Octavio Argüello; Blanca Blanco de Peralta; Rosa Chiquichano; Juan Díaz Roig; Susana Díaz; Juan Gioja; Ramón Ruiz; Juan Salim; Juan Sluga; Jorge Yoma
Radical Civic Union	17: Ricardo Alfonsín; Elsa Álvarez; Mario Barbieri; Hugo Castañón; Jorge Chemes; Eduardo Costa; Gustavo Cusinato; Ulises Forte; Ricardo Gil Lavedra; Silvana Giudici; Daniel Katz; Sandra Rioboó; Gustavo Serebrinsky; María Storani; Silvia Storni; Juan Tunessi; Carlos Urlich	24: Oscar Aguad; Jorge Álvarez; Atilio Benedetti; Ricardo Buryaile; Juan Casañas; Norah Castaldo; Norberto Erro; Gladys Espíndola; Hipólito Faustinelli; Rodolfo Fernández; Mario Fiad; Miguel Giubergia; Mariana Juri; Eduardo Kenny; Rubén Lanceta; Ricardo Mansur; Heriberto Martínez Oddone; Julio Martínez; Pedro Molas; Pablo Orsolini; Sergio Pinto; Agustín Portela; Horacio Quiroga; María Veaute	1: Lucio Aspiazu	1: Héctor del Campillo
Federal Peronism	8: Celia Arena; Natalia Gambaro; Irma García; Mario Martiarena; María Regazzoli; Cipriana Rossi; Felipe Solá; Enrique Thomas	28: Walter Agosto; Eduardo Amadeo; Alfredo Atanasof; Ivana Bianchi; Carlos Carranza; Cristina Cremer de Busti; Zulema Daher; Francisco de Narváez; Gustavo Ferrari; Juan Forconi; Francisco Fortuna; Patricia Gardella; Estela Garnero; Daniel Germano; Eduardo Ibarra; Julio Ledesma; Mario Merlo; Roberto Mouillerón; Jorge Obeid; Sergio Pansa; Alberto Pérez; Ramón Puerta; Raúl Rivara; Roberto Robledo; Claudia Rucci; Nora Videla; Walter Wayar; Gustavo Zavallo	–	–
Civic Coalition	16: Griselda Baldata; Patricia Bullrich; Elisa Carca; Carlos Comi; Héctor Flores; Susana García; Claudia Gil Lozano; Fernando Iglesias; Juan Morán; Adrián Pérez; Héctor Piemonte; Elsa Quiroz; Hilma Ré; María Reyes; Marcela Rodríguez; Juan Vega	1: Alicia Terada	2: Elisa Carrió; Alfonso Prat-Gay	–
Republican Proposal	4: Laura Alonso; María Bertol; Soledad Martínez; Licia Satragno	6: Gladys González; Christian Gribaudo; Silvia Majdalani; Gabriela Michetti; Federico Pinedo; Jorge Triaca	–	1: Esteban Bullrich
Civic Front for Santiago	1: Mirta Pastoriza	4: Norma Abdala de Matarazzo; José Herrera; Ana Luna de Marcos; Jorge Pérez	1: Cristian Oliva	1: Daniel Brue
Peronist	–	6: Juan Álvarez; Graciela Camaño; Oscar Currilén; Marcelo López Arias; Jorge Montoya; Manuel Morejón	–	1: Daniel Asef
Socialist Party	6: Miguel Barrios; Alicia Ciciliani; Roy Cortina; Ricardo Cuccovillo; Mónica Fein; Lisandro Viale	–	–	–
Generation for a National Encounter	5: Horacio Alcuaz; María Linares; Gerardo Milman; Fabián Peralta; Margarita Stolbizer	–	–	–
New Encounter	5: Sergio Basteiro; Carlos Heller; Vilma Ibarra; Jorge Rivas; Martín Sabbatella	–	–	–
Proyecto Sur	5: Alcira Argumedo; Jorge Cardelli; Claudio Lozano; Liliana Parada; Fernando Solanas	–	–	–
Civic Front of Córdoba	–	3: Gumersindo Alonso; Ernesto Martínez Carignano; Susana Mazzarella	–	–
Neuquén People's Movement	2: Alicia Comelli; Olga Guzmán	–	–	1: José Brillo
Solidarity and Equality	3: Verónica Benas; Nora Iturraspe; Eduardo Macaluse	–	–	–
Of the Concertation	2: Héctor Alvaro; Hugo Prieto	–	–	–
Freemen of the South Movement	2: Victoria Donda Pérez; Paula Merchán	–	–	–
Civic and Social Front of Catamarca	–	1: Raúl Paroli	–	–
Democratic Party of Mendoza	–	1: Omar De Marchi	–	–
Democratic Progressive Party	–	1: Carlos Favario	–	–
Dialogue for Buenos Aires	1: Miguel Bonasso	–	–	–
Federal Consensus	–	–	–	1: Juan Scalesi
FORJA Concertation Party	1: Silvia Vázquez	–	–	–
Frente de Todos	1: María Areta	–	–	–
Fueguian Federal Party	–	1: Liliana Fadul	–	–
Liberal Party of Corrientes	–	1: José Arbó	–	–
Progressive Project of Tierra del Fuego	1: Nélida Belous	–	–	–
Salta Renewal Party	–	1: Mónica Torfe	–	–
Valores para mi País	–	1: Cynthia Hotton	–	–
We are all Salta	–	1: Alfredo Olmedo	–	–
Total (Note: The Chamber has 256 voting members. The President of Argentine Chamber of Deputies, Eduardo Fellner, votes only in case of a tied vote.)	126	110	4	16
Total	45.3%	43.0%	1.6%	6.3%

15 July 2010 vote in the Senate
Party	Voted for	Voted against	Abstained	Absent (Did not vote)
G Front for Victory	20: Jorge Banicevich; Eric Calcagno y Maillmann; Jorge Colazo; Lucía Corpacci; Ana Corradi de Beltrán; Elena Corregido; Liliana Fellner; Nicolás Fernández; Daniel Filmus; Marcelo Fuentes; Pedro Guastavino; Marcelo Guinle; Ada Maza; Blanca Osuna; José Pampuro; Nanci Parrilli; Miguel Pichetto; Teresa Quintela; Beatriz Rojkés de Alperovich; Eduardo Torres	6: Rolando Bermejo; César Gioja; Guillermo Jenefes; José Mayans; Daniel Pérsico; Luis Viana	1: Fabio Biancalani	4: Ada Itúrrez de Cappellini; Sergio Mansilla; Marina Riofrío; Élida Vigo
Radical Civic Union	5: Eugenio Artaza; Oscar Castillo; Alfredo Martínez; Gerardo Morales; Ernesto Sanz	11: José Cano; Mario Cimadevilla; Juan Marino; Ramón Mestre; Blanca Monllau; Laura Montero; Roy Nikisch; Luis Petcoff Naidenoff; José Roldán; Arturo Vera; Pablo Verani	–	1: Emilio Rached
Federal Peronism	1: Roxana Latorre	6: Adriana Bortolozzi; Sonia Escudero; Hilda González de Duhalde; María Higonet; Liliana Negre de Alonso; Carlos Verna	2: María Bongiorno; Graciela Di Verna	4: Carlos Menem; Carlos Reutemann; Adolfo Rodríguez Saá; Juan Romero
Civic Front of Córdoba	2: Luis Juez; Norma Morandini	–	–	–
New Encounter	2: María Díaz; José Martínez	–	–	–
Federal Buenos Aires Project	1: Samuel Cabanchik	–	–	–
Civic Coalition	1: María Estenssoro	–	–	–
Liberal Party of Corrientes	–	1: Josefina Meabe	–	–
Neuquén People's Movement	–	1: Horacio Lores	–	–
Production and Labour	–	1: Roberto Basualdo	–	–
Salta Renewal Party	–	1: Juan Pérez Alsina	–	–
Socialist Party	1: Rubén Giustiniani	–	–	–
Total	33	27	3	9
Total	45.8%	37.5%	4.2%	12.5%

The Marriage Equality Law (Spanish: Ley Matrimonio Igualitario, pronounced [lej matɾiˈmonjo iɣwaliˈtaɾjo]) (Note: In some regional languages of Argentina: Quechua: Kikinmiranapura Sawa Apusimi; Guarani: Léi Ñemenda Hekojojavéva; Mapudungun: Ti admapu trapümuwn ñi trürlen; Wichí: N'olhenyajna ta yäme ta is t'at chi ilhamejen n'oyhäj; Toba Qom: Enec Ronaĝac eta'a'; Welsh: Deddf Priodas Gyfunryw, pronounced [dɛðv priˈɔdas ɡəˈvɪnrɪu̯]; Tehuelche: Atachgütüka Pashtraywaw a Katükükan; Puelche: Atachgütü Pashtraywaw Amkatüküch) amended article 172 of the Civil Code to state:

El matrimonio tendrá los mismos requisitos y efectos, con independencia de que los contrayentes sean del mismo o de diferente sexo.

(Marriage shall have the same requisites and effects regardless of whether the parties are of the same or different sex.)

The law also allows transgender people to marry their partners. The first such marriage occurred in San Miguel de Tucumán on August 3, 2010, between Juan Carlos Lizárraga and Rody Humano, a transgender woman who was serving as a councilwoman in Bella Vista. On July 27, 2012, a Buenos Aires couple, Alejandro Grinblat and Carlos Dermgerd, became the first men in Latin America to obtain double paternity of a newborn. Their baby, Tobías, is the natural son of one of the two men and was born to a surrogate mother. He became the first person in Argentina with a birth certificate listing two fathers.

=== Court cases ===
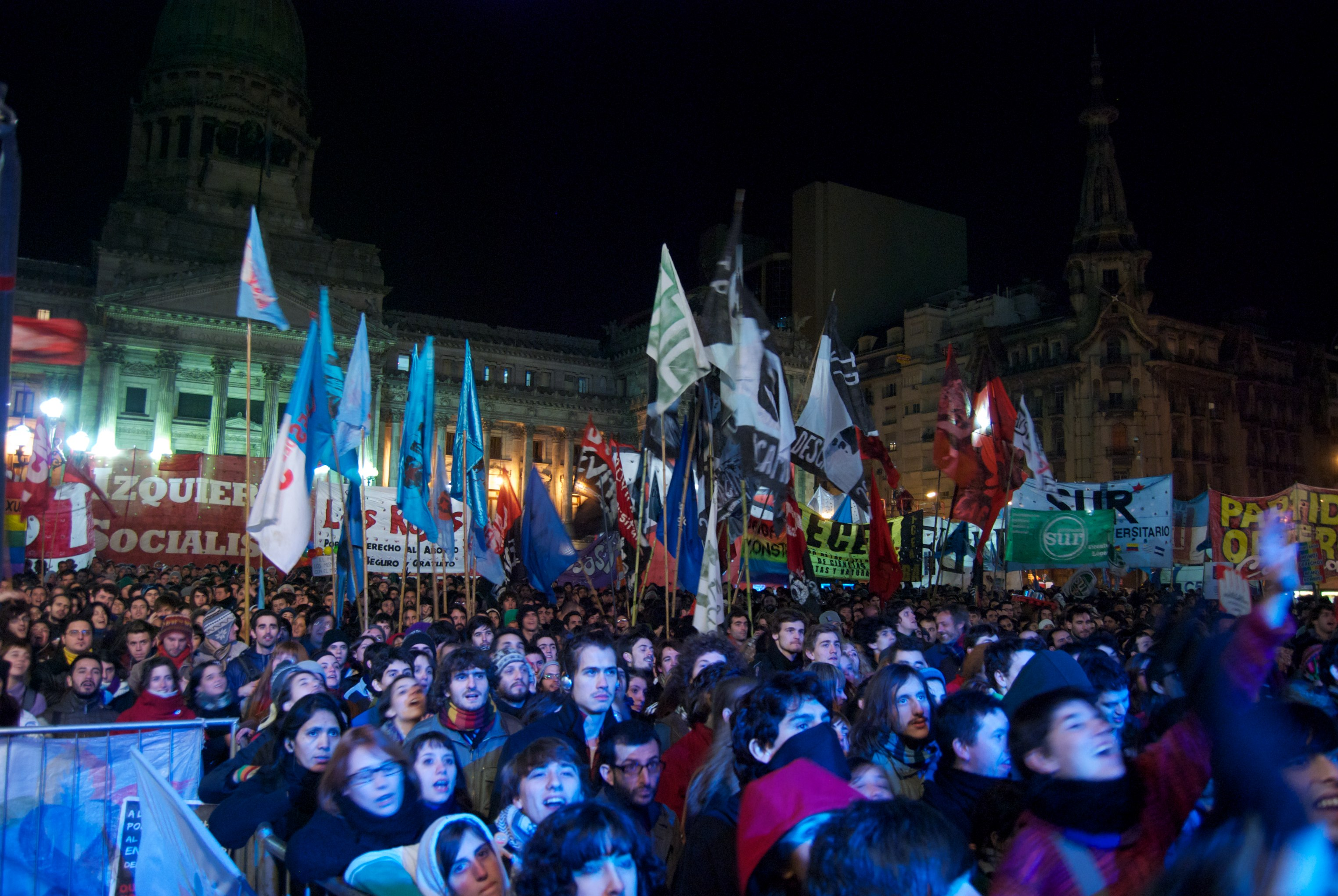
Crowd in support of same-sex marriage in Buenos Aires, 2010

On February 14, 2007, activists María Rachid and Claudia Castrosín Verdú filed a legal appeal challenging the constitutionality of articles 172 and 188 of the Civil Code, which prevented same-sex couples from marrying.

On November 12, 2009, a court in Buenos Aires approved the marriage of a same-sex couple, Alex Freyre and José María Bello, ruling that articles 172 and 188 of the Civil Code were unconstitutional. Chief of Government Mauricio Macri said he would not appeal the ruling, but the marriage registration was blocked on November 30 by another court, pending review by the Supreme Court. In December 2009, the Governor of Tierra del Fuego, Fabiana Ríos, ordered the civil registry office to perform and register their marriage. On December 28, the two men were legally wed in Ushuaia, the provincial capital city, making them the first same-sex couple to marry in Latin America. On April 14, 2010, the marriage was declared null and void, but it technically remained legal because the decision was not communicated to the parties. The married couple said that they would appeal the court's decision if notified. The couple announced their divorce in 2015. Journalist Bruno Bimbi revealed that, although the men were both gay, they were not a couple and only acted as such as part of a plan to champion LGBT rights. On March 10, 2010, a judge in Buenos Aires declared a second same-sex marriage, between Damián Bernath and Jorge Salazar Capón, illegal. On April 16, a third same-sex marriage between two women was annulled by a judge who ruled that Argentine law limited marriage to "a man and a woman". Administrative Judge Elena Liberatori later overturned that decision and declared the marriage valid, ordering the Civil Registry of Buenos Aires to deliver the marriage license to the court.

Following the first legal same-sex marriage in December 2009, seven other same-sex couples were joined in legal matrimony in Argentina before the national law legalizing same-sex marriage took effect at the end of July 2010. At that time, the Supreme Court was considering several cases regarding the right of same-sex couples to marry. On July 2, 2010, some media outlets reported that the Supreme Court had prepared a ruling in favor of Rachid and Castrosín's 2007 case, but ultimately decided not to issue it following the legalization of same-sex marriage.

=== Statistics ===
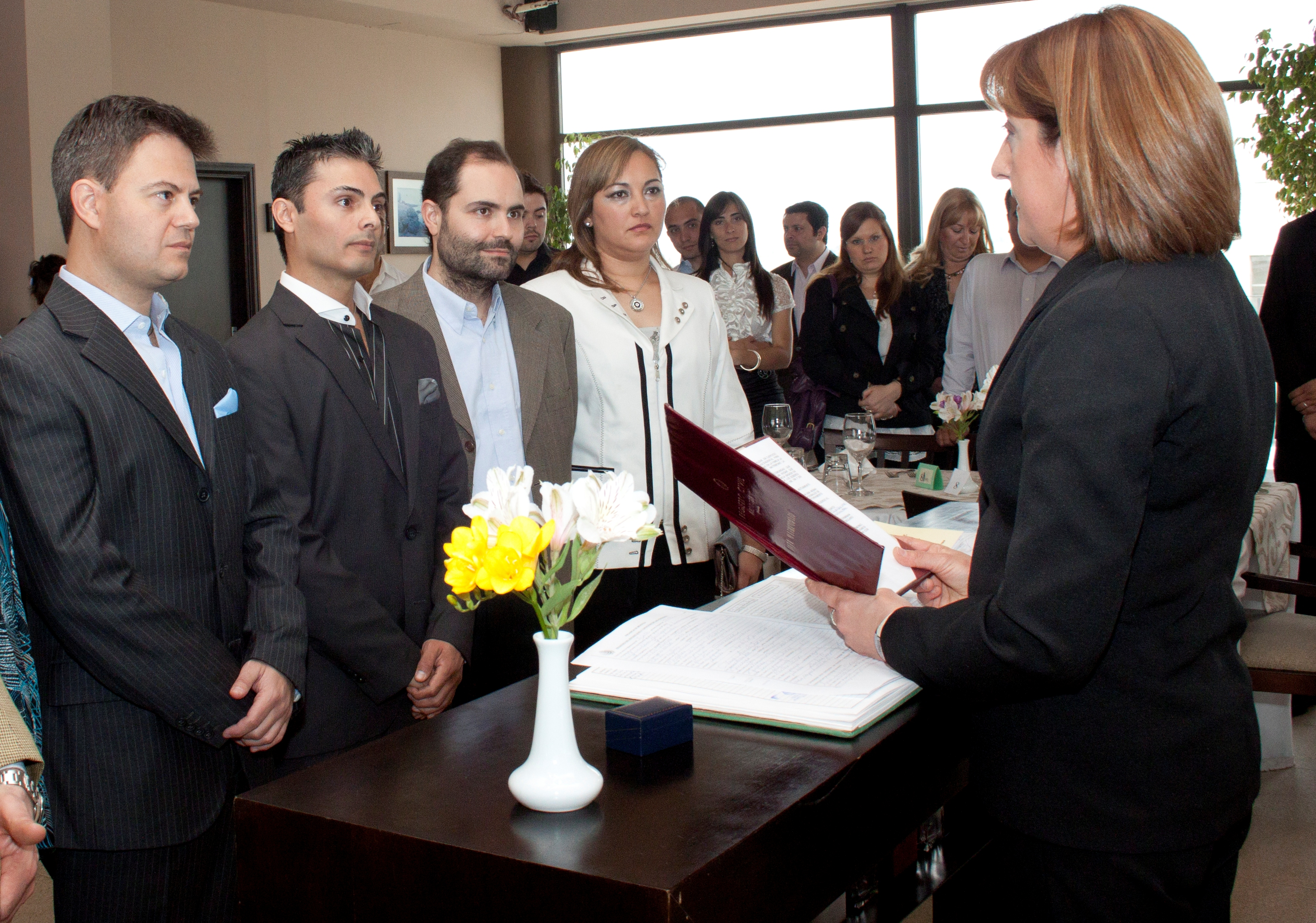
Marriage of singer Carlos Morell and his husband Claudio Adrián Jofré, September 17, 2011

By July 2012, about 5,800 same-sex marriages had occurred in Argentina according to the Argentine Federation of Lesbians, Gays, Bisexuals and Trans People (FALGBT; Federación Argentina de Lesbianas, Gays, Bisexuales y Trans), distributed by jurisdiction as follows: Buenos Aires (1,455), the Autonomous City of Buenos Aires (1,405), Santa Fe (664), Córdoba (632), Mendoza (389), Tucumán (199), Salta (178), Entre Ríos (128), Neuquén (101), San Juan (70), Misiones (64), Río Negro (64), La Pampa (58), Jujuy (56), Chaco (51), Catamarca (49), Chubut (47), Formosa (44), Santiago del Estero (42), San Luis (37), Santa Cruz (35), Corrientes (31), La Rioja (31), and Tierra del Fuego (14). By July 2014, 9,362 same-sex marriages had been performed in Argentina.

By 2017, more than 16,200 same-sex marriages had taken place in Argentina; 4,286 and 3,836 same-sex marriages were performed in the Autonomous City of Buenos Aires and the province of Buenos Aires, respectively. As Argentine law does not require couples who wish to wed to be Argentine nationals or permanent residents, many couples from abroad have come to Argentina to marry, including many couples from Chile and Paraguay. This has made Argentina, and especially Buenos Aires, a very popular marriage destination for same-sex couples. By July 2018, 18,000 same-sex couples had married in Argentina.

By the end of 2021, 5,675 same-sex marriages and 1,577 civil unions had taken place in the Autonomous City of Buenos Aires. Figures for 2020 are lower than previous years because of the restrictions in place due to the COVID-19 pandemic.

Number of marriages and civil unions performed in Buenos Aires
Year	Same-sex unions			Total unions	% same-sex	Same-sex marriages			Total marriages	% same-sex
Year	Female	Male	Total	Total unions	% same-sex	Female	Male	Total	Total marriages	% same-sex
2003	18	61	79	111	71.2%	–	–	–	–	–
2004	22	72	94	163	57.7%	–	–	–	–	–
2005	33	58	91	203	44.8%	–	–	–	–	–
2006	38	65	103	342	30.1%	–	–	–	–	–
2007	34	50	84	407	20.6%	–	–	–	–	–
2008	33	84	117	397	29.5%	–	–	–	–	–
2009	50	111	161	518	31.1%	–	–	–	–	–
2010	19	44	63	555	11.4%	110	283	393	13,390	2.94%
2011	15	22	37	608	6.09%	177	432	609	13,209	4.61%
2012	15	27	42	605	6.94%	132	294	426	12,667	3.36%
2013	12	17	29	670	4.33%	152	284	436	11,642	3.75%
2014	10	25	35	636	5.50%	157	278	435	11,478	3.79%
2015	14	17	31	509	6.09%	153	267	420	11,715	3.59%
2016	13	15	28	591	4.74%	182	280	462	11,630	3.97%
2017	28	31	59	947	6.23%	160	264	424	10,511	4.03%
2018	38	76	114	1,480	7.70%	198	321	519	10,893	4.76%
2019	62	110	172	2,158	7.97%	203	375	578	11,220	5.15%
2020	16	31	47	755	6.23%	104	144	248	3,877	6.40%
2021	88	103	191	2,919	6.54%	309	416	725	11,989	6.05%
2022	187	240	427	6,392	6.68%	388	464	852	13,426	6.35%
2023	139	153	292	4,351	6.71%	329	427	756	11,506	6.57%
2024	171	193	364	5,843	6.23%	300	394	694	10,446	6.64%
2025	197	204	401	6,231	6.44%	266	281	547	9,549	5.73%

=== Religious performance ===
The Catholic Church opposes same-sex marriage and does not allow its priests to officiate at such marriages. In July 2010, while the marriage law was under consideration, Cardinal Jorge Bergoglio, the Archbishop of Buenos Aires (later Pope Francis), wrote a letter to Argentina's cloistered nuns in which he said:

In the coming weeks, the Argentine people will face a situation whose outcome can seriously harm the family…At stake is the identity and survival of the family: father, mother and children. At stake are the lives of many children who will be discriminated against in advance, and deprived of their human development given by a father and a mother and willed by God. At stake is the total rejection of God's law engraved in our hearts. [...] Let's not be naive: This is not a simple political fight; it is a destructive proposal to God's plan. This is not a mere legislative proposal (that's just its form), but a move by the father of lies that seeks to confuse and deceive the children of God… Let's look to St. Joseph, Mary, and the Child to ask fervently that they defend the Argentine family in this moment... May they support, defend, and accompany us in this war of God.

After L'Osservatore Romano reported this, several priests expressed their support for the law and one was defrocked. Observers believe that the Church's strident opposition and Bergoglio's language, which one political opponent characterized as "medieval, reactionary", worked in favor of the law's passage and that Roman Catholic officials learned from their failed campaign against the same-sex marriage law to adopt a different tone in later debates on social issues such as parental surrogacy. As of 2005, more than three-fourths of Argentines identified themselves as Catholic, but less than two-fifths of them attended religious service at least once a month. Evangelical groups also joined in opposition. In December 2023, the Holy See published Fiducia supplicans, a declaration allowing Catholic priests to bless couples who are not considered to be married according to church teaching, including the blessing of same-sex couples. The Bishop of San Isidro, Óscar Vicente Ojea Quintana, issued a statement on 30 December that "a brutal experience of abandonment by the Church that has done so much harm to us and that has alienated so many brothers and sisters. Living in an irregular situation or carrying out a homosexual union does not obscure many aspects of the lives of people who seek to be enlightened with a blessing and upon receiving it, this becomes the greatest possible good for these brothers since it leads to conversion."

Some small Christian denominations authorise the blessing of same-sex unions. The Waldensian Evangelical Church of the River Plate became the first denomination in Argentina to do so in 2006. In 2006, a lesbian couple, Virgina Cortés and Jessica Schmukler, were blessed at the Danish Church of San Telmo in Buenos Aires, part of the Church of Denmark, the first blessing for a same-sex couple in Argentina. The Evangelical Methodist Church in Argentina allows its clergy the "freedom to accompany" same-sex couples and to bless their unions. In July 2016, Jesús Regules and Jonathan Díaz were married at the Iglesia Nuestra Señora del Valle in the town of San Roque near Maipú by an Anglican priest, the first church wedding for a same-sex couple in Argentina. A few months earlier, a lesbian couple, Victoria Escobar and Romina Charur, were married at a Reform Jewish synagogue in Buenos Aires, marking the first Jewish same-sex wedding in Latin America.

== Public opinion ==
Support for same-sex marriage among 18–21-year-olds according to a 2016 survey from the Varkey Foundation

According to a Pew Research Center survey conducted between November 15, 2013, and January 8, 2014, 52% of Argentines supported same-sex marriage, while 40% were opposed. A 2015 Ipsos poll found that 59% of Argentines were in favour of same-sex marriage. A further 16% supported civil unions or other forms of legal recognition.

A September–October 2016 survey by the Varkey Foundation found that 73% of 18–21-year-olds supported same-sex marriage in Argentina.

The 2017 AmericasBarometer showed that 65% of Argentines supported same-sex marriage. This level of support was the second highest among the 11 South American countries polled, behind neighboring Uruguay at 75%. A May 2021 Ipsos poll showed that 73% of Argentines supported same-sex marriage, 9% supported civil unions but not marriage, while 10% were opposed to all legal recognition for same-sex couples, and 8% were undecided. In addition, 20% of Argentines had already attended the wedding of a same-sex couple.

A 2023 Ipsos poll showed that 70% of Argentines supported same-sex marriage, while 8% supported civil unions or other types of partnerships but not marriage, 14% were undecided and 8% were opposed to all recognition for same-sex couples. A Pew Research Center poll conducted between February and May 2023 showed that 67% of Argentines supported same-sex marriage, 26% were opposed and 7% did not know or had refused to answer. When divided by age, support was highest among 18–34-year-olds at 75% and lowest among those aged 35 and above at 62%. Women (73%) were also more likely to support same-sex marriage than men (60%). The 2023 Latinobarómetro showed that support had increased to 73%, while 24% were opposed and 3% were undecided or had refused to answer.

== See also ==
- LGBT rights in Argentina
- Recognition of same-sex unions in the Americas
