= Juan Carlos Marino =

Juan Carlos Marino may refer to:

- Juan Carlos Mariño, Peruvian footballer
- Juan Carlos Marino (politician), Argentine politician
