= Silvia Elías de Pérez =

Argentine politician (born 1964)

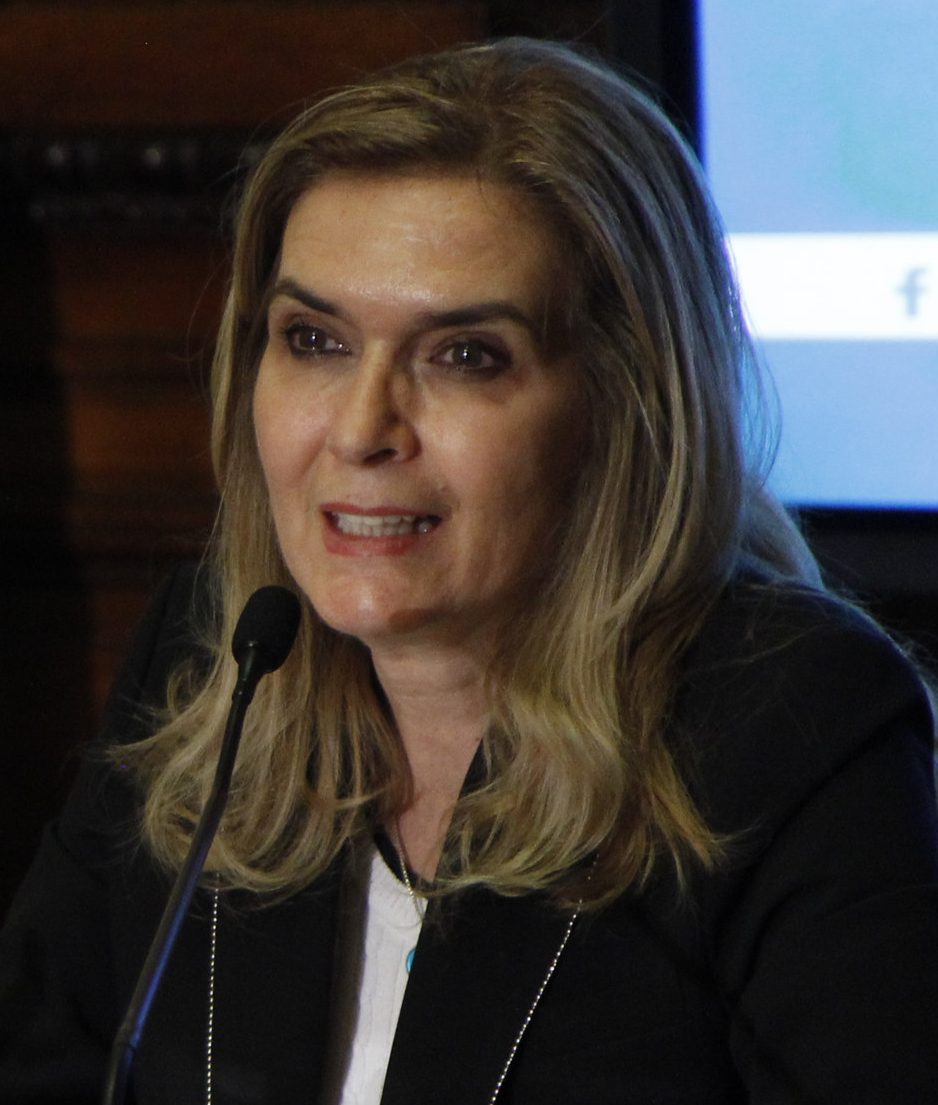

National Senator
- In office 18 December 2013 – 10 December 2021
- Constituency: Tucumán

Provincial Legislator of Tucumán
- In office 26 October 2011 – 18 December 2013
- Constituency: I – Capital

Personal details
- Born: Silvia Beatriz Elías; 10 May 1964 (age 62) Juan Bautista Alberdi, Argentina
- Party: Radical Civic Union
- Other political affiliations: Social and Civic Agreement (2009–2011); Juntos por el Cambio (since 2015)
- Education: Saint Thomas Aquinas University of the North

Silvia Beatriz Elías de Pérez (born 10 May 1964) is an Argentine politician who was a National Senator for Tucumán Province from 2013 to 2021. A member of the Radical Civic Union (UCR), Elías de Pérez first took office on 18 December 2013 in replacement of José Manuel Cano, and completed the remainder of his term until 2015. She was then elected in her own right in that year's election.

Elías de Pérez was the Juntos por el Cambio candidate to the governorship of Tucumán in 2019, but lost against the Justicialist Party incumbent, Juan Luis Manzur. During her time as senator, Elías de Pérez was known for her socially conservative positions on LGBT rights and abortion.

== Early life and career ==
Silvia Beatriz Elías was born on 10 May 1964 in Juan Bautista Alberdi, a small town in southern Tucumán Province. She finished high school at Escuela Normal Florentino. She has a public accounting degree and a master's degree in business administration from the Saint Thomas Aquinas University of the North, having graduated in 1985. She has worked as a teacher and as a federal attorney.

She is married to Luis Pérez and has three children. Elías de Pérez is known for her devout Catholicism.

== Political career ==
In the 2009 legislative election, Elías de Pérez was the second candidate to the National Senate in Tucumán for the Social and Civic Agreement list, behind José Manuel Cano. The list received 15.92% of the vote, and was the second-most voted in the province, meaning only Cano was elected for the minority seat.

In 2010 she was elected president of the UCR Committee of San Miguel de Tucumán, and in the 2011 elections, she was elected to the Provincial Legislature.

On 18 December 2013, she was sworn in as senator in replacement of Cano, who had been elected to the National Chamber of Deputies. Elías de Pérez then completed the remainder of his 2009–2015 term. She sought re-election in the 2015 elections, and ran as the first candidate in the Cambiemos list in Tucumán. The Cambiemos list received 35.35%, and, as the second-most voted list, received the seat for the minority. That year, she was elected vice-president of the National Committee of the UCR.

As senator, Elías de Pérez formed part of the parliamentary commissions on Justice and Criminal Affairs, Budget and Finances, Health, Women's Affairs, Media and Freedom of Expression, and National Economy and Investment. She was president of the health commission from 2014 to 2018, and later served as chair of the national economy commission from 2018 to 2021.

In 2019, Elías de Pérez was the Juntos por el Cambio–Frente Vamos Tucumán candidate to the governorship of Tucumán, facing against Justicialist Party–FDT incumbent, Juan Luis Manzur. She lost with 20% of the vote against Manzur's 50%.

Pérez did not run for re-election in the Senate in 2021, and her term expired on 10 December 2021.

=== Views and positions ===
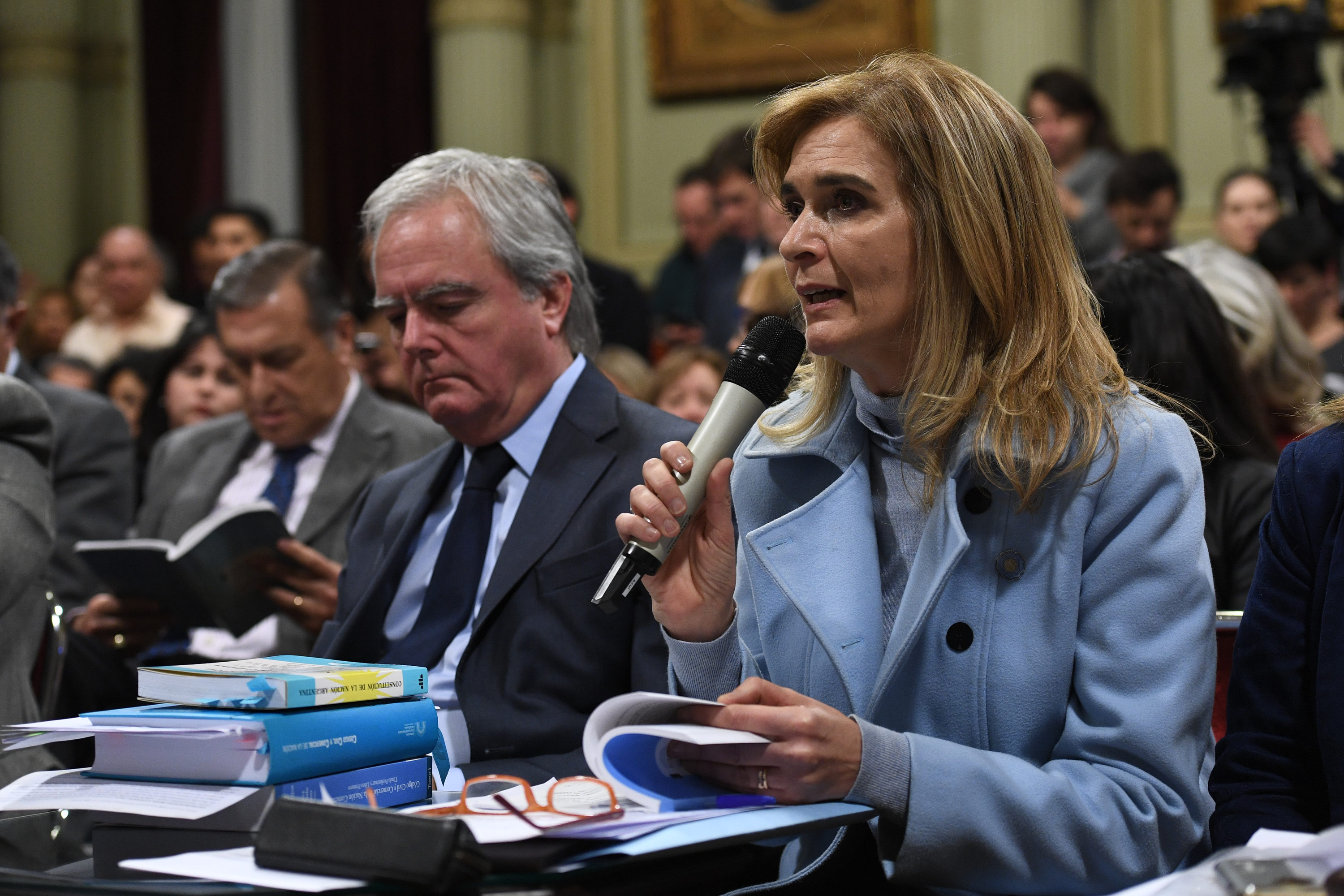
Elías de Pérez in 2018, during the debate on the legalisation of abortion.

Elías de Pérez is known for her staunch social conservative views. During the 2010 debate on the legalisation of same-sex marriage in Argentina, Elías de Pérez called same-sex unions a "legal disaster" (Spanish: mamarracho jurídico).

In 2018, during the first debate on the legalisation of abortion in Argentina, Elías de Pérez had a widely publicised argument with molecular biologist Alberto Kornblihtt during the latter's exposition in the Senate health commission. At the end of Kornblihtt's presentation, Elías de Pérez asked him if he advocated for the use of abortion for eugenic purposes, such as to avoid the birth of children with Down's syndrome. Kornblihtt replied that genetic counseling contemplated the detection of serious illnesses in fetuses, and that Down syndrome does not constitute a serious illness. The exchange, and Kornblihtt's reply to Elías de Pérez ("no está bien, está mal"), became popular on social media. Elías de Pérez voted against the Voluntary Interruption of Pregnancy Bill again when it was debated by the Senate in 2020.

In May 2020, Elías de Pérez had another widely publicised exchange with Vice President (and Senate president) Cristina Fernández de Kirchner. When Elías de Pérez referred to Fernández de Kirchner as "presidente", Fernández de Kirchner (who famously prefers to be referred by the less common, but still grammatically correct female form, presidenta) referred to Elías de Pérez by the unambiguously male term senador, instead of the female senadora.
