= Mónica Macha =

Argentine politician

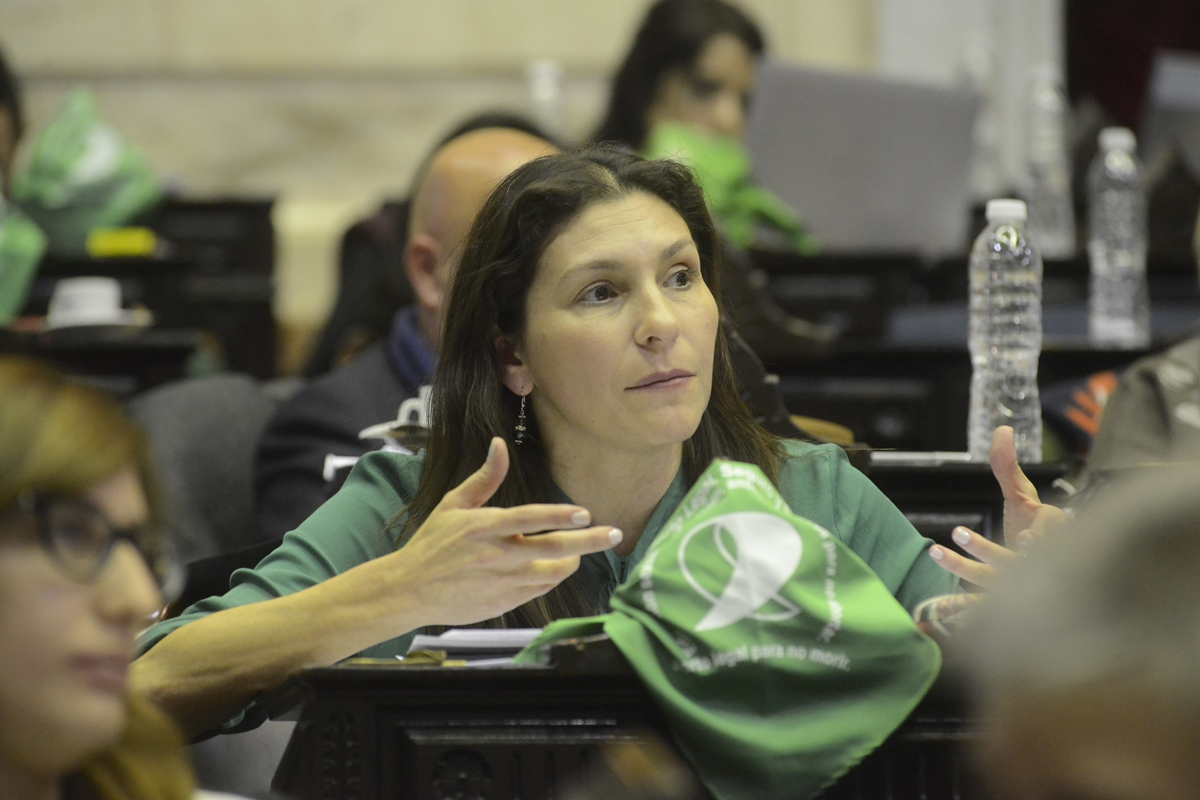

National Deputy
- Incumbent
- Assumed office 10 December 2017
- Constituency: Buenos Aires

Provincial Senator of Buenos Aires
- In office 10 December 2013 – 10 December 2017
- Constituency: First Electoral Section

Personal details
- Born: 17 February 1972 (age 54) Buenos Aires, Argentina
- Party: EDE
- Other political affiliations: New Encounter (2009–2015); Front for Victory (2011–2017); Unidad Ciudadana (2017–2019); Frente de Todos (2019–present)
- Spouse: Martín Sabbatella
- Education: University of Buenos Aires

Mónica Fernanda Macha (born 17 February 1972) is an Argentine politician, currently serving as National Deputy representing Buenos Aires Province. A member of New Encounter, Macha was elected in 2017 for the Unidad Ciudadana coalition, and currently sits in the Frente de Todos bloc. She previously served as a member of the Provincial Senate of Buenos Aires Province.

== Early life and education ==
Macha was born on 17 February 1972 in Buenos Aires. She was raised in the barrio of Caballito. Macha studied psychology at the University of Buenos Aires, graduating in 2000, and has a master's degree in Epidemiology, Health Administration and Health Policies from the National University of Lanús.

She has lived in Castelar since 1992. She is married to Martín Sabbatella, former mayor of Morón Partido and founder of New Encounter. Macha and Sabbatella have one daughter.

== Political career ==
In the 2013 legislative election, Macha ran for a seat in the Senate of Buenos Aires Province in the First Electoral Section, as part of the Front for Victory list. As senator, she presided the upper chamber's parliamentary commission on Human Rights.

Macha ran for a seat in the Argentine Chamber of Deputies in the 2017 legislative election; she was the seventh candidate in the Unidad Ciudadana list in Buenos Aires Province. The Unidad Ciudadana list received 36.28% of the votes, and Macha was elected. She was sworn in on 6 December 2017. She was a supporter of the 2020 Voluntary Interruption of Pregnancy bill, which legalized abortion in Argentina.

Ahead of the 2021 primary elections, she was confirmed as one of the Frente de Todos candidates for re-election in Buenos Aires Province.

== Electoral history ==
Electoral history of Mónica Macha
Election	Office	List	#	District	Votes			Result	Ref.
Election	Office	List	#	District	Total	%	P.	Result	Ref.
2013	Provincial Senator	Front for Victory	3	Third Electoral Section	874,361	28.63%	1st (Note: Presented on an electoral list. The data shown represents the share of the vote the entire party/alliance received in that constituency.)	Elected	
2017	National Deputy	Unidad Ciudadana	7	Buenos Aires Province	3,383,114	36.28%	2nd	Elected	
2021	National Deputy	Frente de Todos	15	Buenos Aires Province	3,444,446	38.59%	2nd	Elected	
