= National Agency for Controlled Materials (Argentina) =

The National Agency for Controlled Materials (Spanish: Agencia Nacional de Materiales Controlados), formerly the National Weapons Registry of the Argentine Republic (Spanish: Registro Nacional de Armas de la República Argentina) is the body in charge of registering, supervising and controlling firearms, other regulated materials and their users within the Argentine national territory with the sole exclusion of weapons belonging to the Armed Forces. They are also charged with proposing and implementing policies to promote better compliance with the Ministry of Justice and Human Rights.

== Functions ==
- Register, authorize, control and supervise all activities related to the manufacture, commercialization, acquisition, transfer, possession, carrying, use, delivery, safekeeping, destruction, introduction, exit, import, transit, export, kidnappings, seizures and confiscations; made with firearms, ammunition, gunpowder, explosives and the like, materials for special uses, and other controlled materials, its users, manufacturing, storage, storage and marketing facilities; according to the current classifications of controlled materials, within the national territory, with the sole exclusion of weapons belonging to the armed forces.
- Manage the National Bank of Controlled Materials and the network of deposits that are part of it.
- Carry out the destruction, exclusively and exclusively throughout the national territory, of all material controlled within the framework of laws 20,429, 25,938, 26,216.
- Determine the methods and procedures for the destruction of controlled materials, guaranteeing their effectiveness, efficiency and sustainability in relation to the environment.
- Carry out awareness and sensitization programs on disarmament and control of the proliferation of firearms in society, which promote a culture of non-violence and the peaceful resolution of conflicts.
- Carry out campaigns to regularize the registration situation of people who have firearms under their power, controlled materials and related activities.
- Organize and dictate training courses and seminars for technicians and officials whose performance is linked to the subject. Likewise, train civil society organizations, universities, territorial and neighborhood organizations, national or international press media.
- Establish citizen control systems for the authorizations granted by the agency, especially considering mechanisms that contribute to the prevention of gender violence.
- Carry out information exchange policies regarding regulations and processes with foreign organizations within the framework of international cooperation.
- Carry out research programs on the arms market, its use and its consequences, which may be relevant for the adoption of strategic policies.
- Evaluate and analyze the effectiveness of technical and legal standards and make proposals for modifications to the corresponding bodies.

== Directors ==
N.º	Executive Director	Period
1	Matías Molle	7 October 2015 - 3 July 2016
2	Natalia Gambaro	17 May 2016 - 4 July 2018
3	Eugenio Cozzi	4 July 2018 - 1 January 2020
4	Ramiro Urristi	24 April 2020 -
