= Federal Authority for Audiovisual Communication Services =

Former broadcasting regulator of Argentina

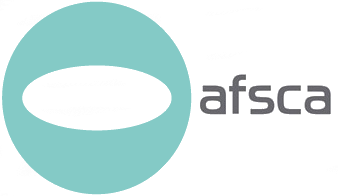
The logo of AFSCA.

The Federal Authority for Audiovisual Communication Services (Spanish: Autoridad Federal de Servicios de Comunicación Audiovisual; AFSCA) was an agency of the government of Argentina with the power to regulate television and radio services. It began activities on December 10, 2009, two months after the passage of the Law 26,522 of Audiovisual Communications Services (Ley de Medios), and replaced the Federal Broadcasting Committee (Comité Federal de Radiodifusión, COMFER). ASFCA was merged into the Ente Nacional de Comunicaciones on December, 29th, 2015 by Presidential Decree 267.

Its former director was Martín Sabbatella.

== Composition ==
The AFSCA was led by a seven-member board, consisting of the following:

- 1 president and 1 director named by the president.
- 3 directors nominated by parliamentary committee, each representing one of the top three parliamentary blocs.
- 2 directors nominated by the Federal Council for Audiovisual Communication; one of these had to be an academic in the fields of information sciences, communications or journalism from a national university.

== History ==
The first predecessor to AFSCA was CONART, the National Radio and Television Commission, which came into being in 1957 under the government of Pedro Eugenio Aramburu.

=== Federal Broadcasting Committee ===
The Federal Broadcasting Committee (Comité Federal de Radiodifusión, COMFER) was formed with the National Telecommunications Law (Law 19,798), passed in 1972 during the de facto presidency of Alejandro Agustín Lanusse.

When the National Broadcasting Law (Law 22,285) was passed in 1980 during the military government of Jorge Rafael Videla, COMFER retained its status as regulator. From 1980 until 2009, COMFER was run by various managers and directors, each of them named by the president. Law 22,285 specified a governing board consisting of representatives from the army, navy and air force, the secretaries of public information and communications, and representatives of the trade associations for radio and television.

=== AFSCA ===
AFSCA was formed in 2009 after the passage of Law 26,522. It had the power to award television licenses, regulate programming and sanction violators with fines.

On September 17, 2012, President Cristina Fernández de Kirchner tapped Martín Sabbatella, a former member of the Chamber of Deputies and one-time intendant of Morón, Buenos Aires, to head up the agency. Sabbatella took the post on October 1.

In December 2015, new president Mauricio Macri placed AFSCA under the direction of the Ministry of Communications and combined it with AFTIC, the Federal Authority for Information and Communications Technologies, as the Ente Nacional de Comunicaciones (National Communications Entity, ENACOM). The combined agency was initially run by Miguel De Godoy, former secretary for media in Buenos Aires.
