= Daniel Giacomino =

Argentine politician

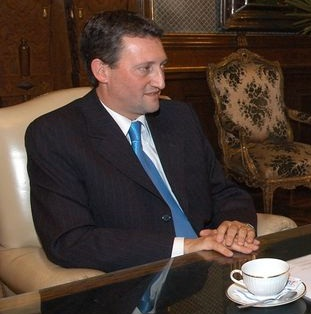

National Deputy
- In office December 10, 2011 – December 10, 2015
- Constituency: Córdoba
- In office December 10, 2005 – December 10, 2007
- Constituency: Córdoba

Mayor of Córdoba, Argentina
- In office December 10, 2007 – December 9, 2011
- Preceded by: Luis Juez
- Succeeded by: Ramón Javier Mestre

Personal details
- Born: June 28, 1964 (age 62) San Francisco, Córdoba
- Party: Radical Civic Union (1983-2003); New Party (2003-07); Civic and Social Front (2007-)
- Spouse: Gabriela Almagro
- Education: National University of Córdoba
- Profession: Biochemist

Daniel Oscar Giacomino (born June 28, 1964) is an Argentine politician elected Mayor of Córdoba in 2007. He was elected National Deputy for Córdoba Province for second non-sequent term in 2011.

== Life and times ==
Giacomino was born in San Francisco, Córdoba, to a family of Piedmontese descent. He earned an American Field Service scholarship with which he attended the University of Kentucky in 1981-82. He then enrolled at the National University of Córdoba, and became active in the Franja Morada, a nationwide student organization allied with the centrist UCR. Giacomino earned a degree in Pharmacology, and later a Master's Degree in Business Administration at the Catholic University of Córdoba. He married the former Gabriela Almagro, and they had three children.

Giacomino served in the student board at the University of Córdoba's Enrique Barros Cultural Center from 1987 and became its director in 1989. He was appointed Director of Student Affairs by the university in 1990, and as Director of its Blood Laboratory in 1992, serving in that capacity until 2003.

Giacomino joined former prosecutor Luis Juez in the latter's newly established Partido Nuevo (New Party). Juez, who had resigned under pressure in 2002 amid corruption investigations of Governor José Manuel de la Sota, was a Peronist (traditional opponents of the UCR). They had, however, been acquainted since their days at the university. Giacomino accepted Juez's nomination as his running mate in elections for Mayor of Córdoba in 2003, and the duo were elected by a landslide.

He was elected in 2005 to a seat in the Argentine Chamber of Deputies. Juez, however, ran unsuccessfully for Governor of Córdoba in 2007, losing a controversial recount. Giacomino resigned his seat in Congress to run for the post and was elected mayor, defeating UCR candidate Ramón Mestre, jr, and de la Sota's wife, Olga Ruitort. Mayor Giacomino inherited a municipal workforce which had doubled during the Juez tenure, absorbing 74% of the city's us$500 million annual budget. His proposals to reduce overtime pay for these employees became the source of friction with the Municipal Workers' Union, effectively ending his alliance with Juez. He enacted the city's, and one of the nation's, first smoking ban ordinances in 2009.
