= Miguel Riglos =

Coordinates: 36°51′S 63°42′W

- Town
- Interactive map of Miguel Riglos
- Country: Argentina
- Province: La Pampa
- Time zone: UTC−3 (ART)

Miguel Riglos is a town in La Pampa Province in Argentina.
