= Natalia Gambaro =

Argentine politician

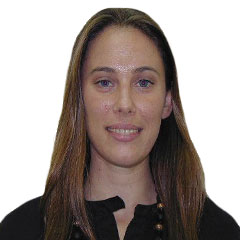
Natalia Gambaro portrait

Natalia Gambaro (born September 1, 1977) is an Argentine lawyer and politician who served as executive director of the Argentine National Agency for Controlled Materials from May 17, 2016 to July 4, 2018.

== Background ==
She was an advisor to the National Deputy Francisco de Narváez in the Foreign Relations and Constitutional Affairs committees between 2005 and 2007. In December 2009, she became a National Deputy for the province of Buenos Aires.

She was appointed as the executive director of the Argentine National Agency for Controlled Materials from May 17, 2016 to July 4, 2018.
