= Martín Sabbatella =

Argentine politician

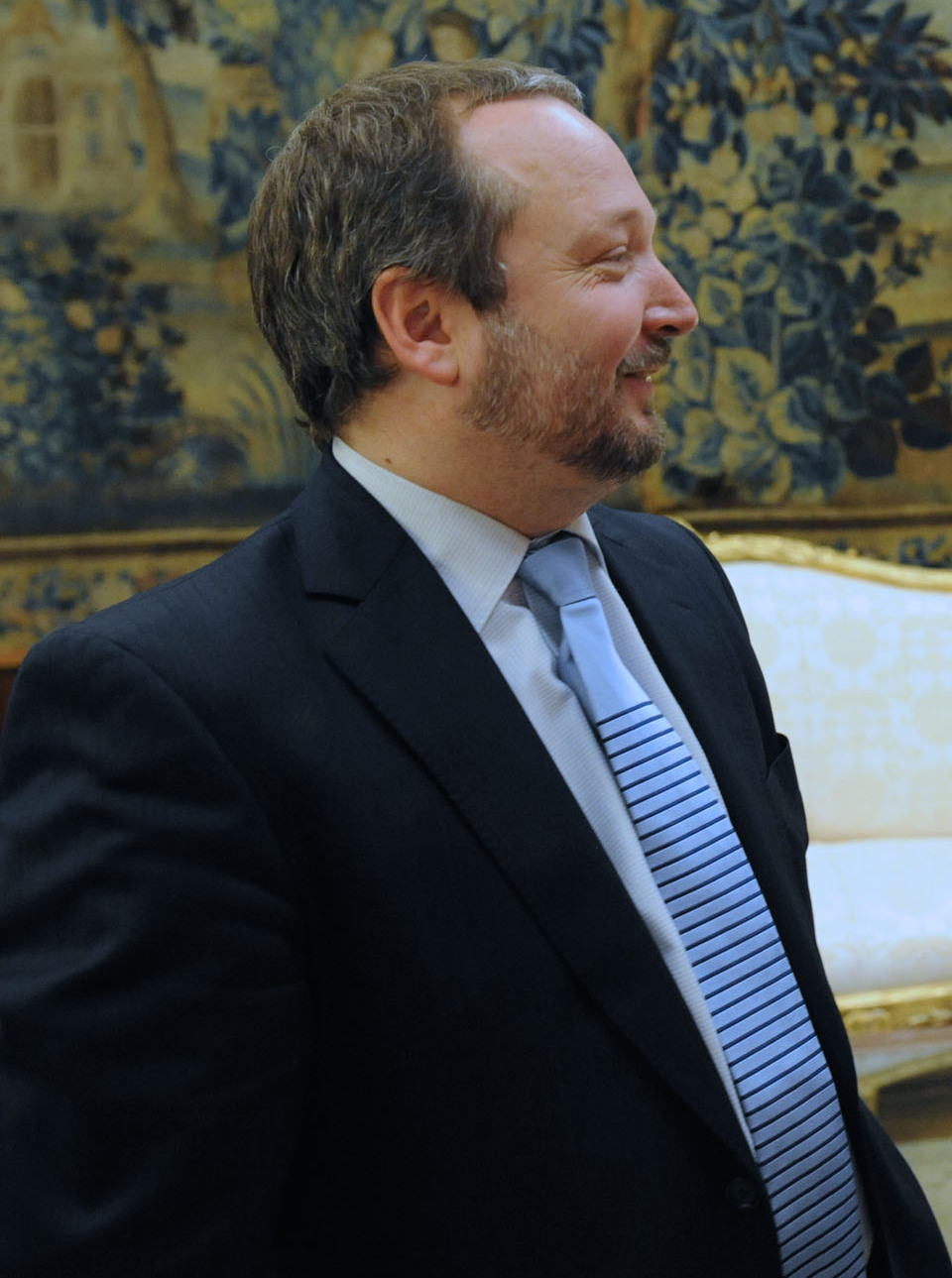
- Sabbatella in 2012

Director of the Federal Authority for Audiovisual Communication Services
- In office 1 October 2012 – 23 December 2015
- Preceded by: Gabriel Mariotto
- Succeeded by: Agustín Garzón

National Deputy
- In office 10 December 2009 – 10 December 2013
- Constituency: Buenos Aires Province

Mayor of Morón
- In office 10 December 1999 – 10 December 2009
- Preceded by: Guillermo Crespo
- Succeeded by: Lucas Ghi

Personal details
- Born: 14 April 1970 (age 56) Morón, Buenos Aires Province, Argentina
- Party: Broad Front (1993–2002); New Encounter (since 2004)
- Other political affiliations: Frepaso (1994–2001); Front for Victory (2003–2019); Frente de Todos (since 2019)
- Spouse: Mónica Macha

Martín Sabbatella (born 14 April 1970) is an Argentine politician and leader of the New Encounter party. From 1999 to 2009, he was intendente (mayor) of Morón, a partido in the Greater Buenos Aires metropolitan area. He was also a member of the Argentine Chamber of Deputies from 2009 to 2013, and director of the Federal Authority for Audiovisual Communication Services from 2012 to 2015. From 2020 to 2023, Sabbatella was the chairman of the Matanza–Riachuelo Basin Authority (ACUMAR).

== Early life and career ==
Sabbatella was born in the western Buenos Aires suburb of Morón in 1970. He enrolled at the Manuel Dorrego National Middle School, where he became active in the Communist Party of Argentina. He served as Secretary of the center-left Frepaso caucus in the Morón City Council from 1995, and in 1997, was elected to the body on the Alliance ticket recently formed with the centrist Radical Civic Union (UCR). He is married to psychologist and fellow politician Mónica Macha, with whom he has one daughter.

== Mayor of Morón ==
An institutional crisis developed in the city government when, in December 1998, Mayor Juan Carlos Rousselot was suspended amid corruption charges. Sabbatella was named to head the committee investigating Rousselot, and the latter was impeached. He was nominated as the Alliance candidate for mayor, and in elections the following October, was elected to the office.

The youngest mayor in the city's history, Sabbatella created a civilian review board and Discrecionalidad Zero ("Zero Tolerance"), an anti-corruption office, during his first year. He signed an agreement to the effect with Transparency International whereby the Berlin-based corruption monitoring group would review all city contracts, as well as the personal financial disclosure forms of its elected officials. A fiscal conservative, he trimmed the municipal workforce by 1,000 (23%) and reduced the city's debt by over 20%; his rescission of the waste collection service subcontracted during the Rousselot tenure alone saved the city nearly us$6 million annually.

The December 2001 resignation of President Fernando de la Rúa, who had been elected in 1999 on the Alliance ticket, dissolved the latter party, and in 2002, Sabbatella formed the Nuevo Morón ("New Morón") party. His efforts against municipal and subcontractor corruption were featured in a July 1, 2003, story in the Wall Street Journal. Running for reelection that year, he refused to join a larger Party list, and instead urged voters to "cut the ballot." Adopting school scissors as a campaign symbol, Sabbatella supported Justicialist Party candidates for Governor and the Provincial Legislature, while only fielding candidates for City Council and School District elections. The strategy succeeded, and both Sabbatella and the candidate he supported for Governor (the incumbent, Felipe Solá) won in Morón as well as in the province as a whole. Sabbatella launched a new alliance, Encuentro por la Democracia y la Equidad ("Encounter for Democracy and Equality"), in 2004, and his candidates won 9 of 12 seats contested in the 2005 City Council elections. He was named Executive Secretary of Mercociudades, a conference of 160 cities in the Mercosur trade bloc, for a two-year term in November 2006, and in 2007 served as coordinator of Mercosur's Municipal Advisory Forum. Reelected as Mayor in 2007, he earned a Konex Award in 2008 for his work in public administration, He later reaped controversy, however, by signing a municipal ordinance in February 2009 that would donate stray animals to laboratories for animal testing.

== Congressional term and AFSCA ==
Sabbatella ran for a seat in the Argentine Chamber of Deputies in 2009, merging his Encounter ticket with the leftist Free of the South Movement, the Communist Party, and others into a Nuevo Encuentro ("New Encounter"). Garnering fourth place in the province, the party nevertheless elected two members to Congress: Sabbatella and Graciela Iturraspe (Mar del Plata). He expressed support for President Cristina Fernández de Kirchner ahead of the 2011 general elections. He ran for Governor of Buenos Aires on his New Encounter ticket later in the year, and obtained fourth place (6.4%). He remained as head of the New Encounter caucus in the Lower House.

Sabbatella was appointed director of the Federal Authority on Audiovisual Communication Services (AFSCA) on October 1, 2012, at the height of ongoing controversies between Clarín and Kirchnerism over a 2009 anti-trust law that would limit the number of radio and television licenses held by the Clarín Group (the premier media conglomerate in Argentina).
