= Liliana Negre de Alonso =

Argentine politician

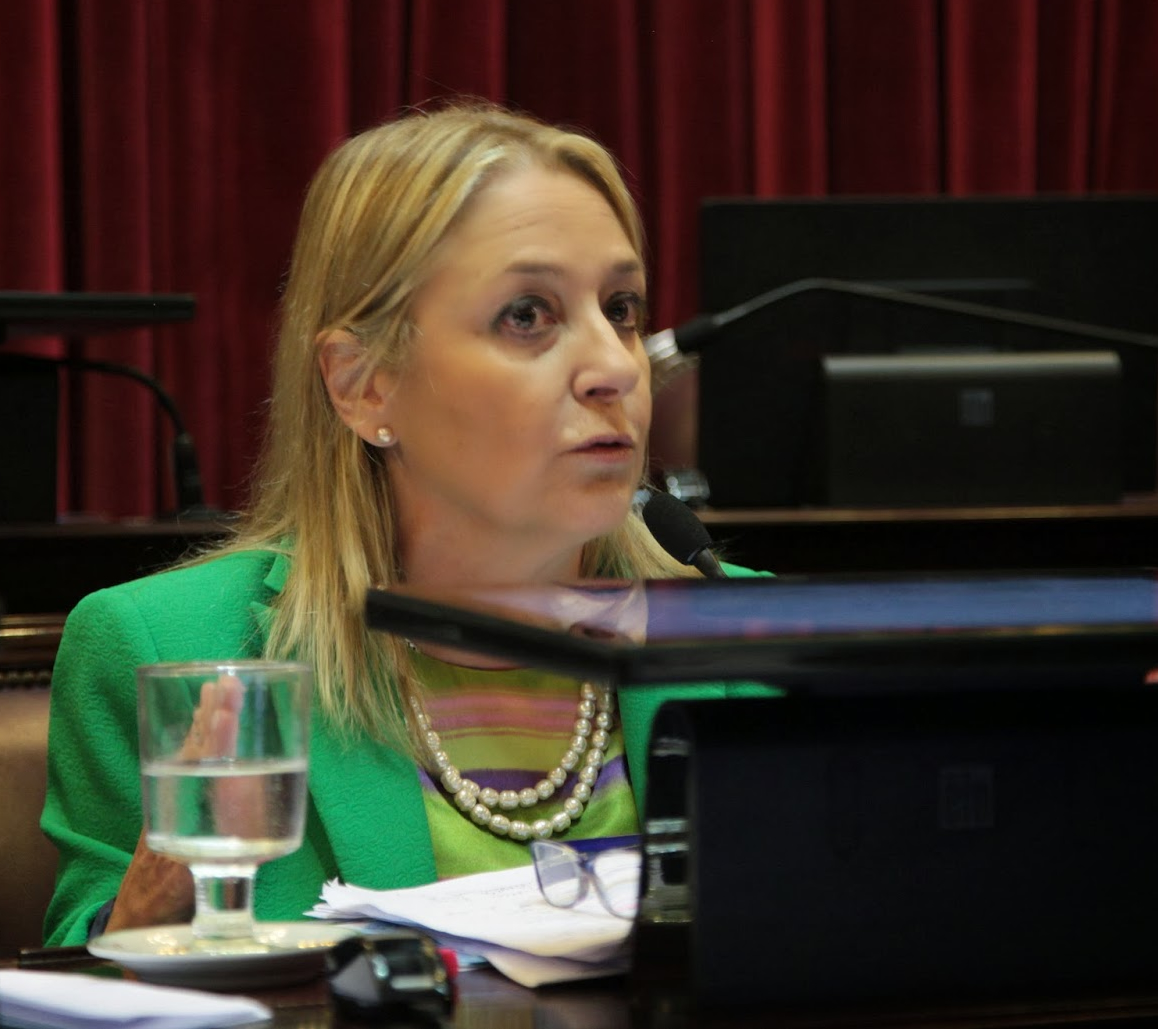

National Senator
- In office 14 March 2001 – 10 December 2017
- Constituency: San Luis

National Deputy
- In office 10 December 1999 – 14 March 2001
- Constituency: San Luis

Personal details
- Born: 18 May 1954 (age 71) San Luis, Argentina
- Party: Justicialist Party
- Other political affiliations: Federal Commitment
- Spouse: Mario Ernesto Alonso
- Profession: Lawyer

Liliana Alonso (born 18 May 1954) (née Negre) is an Argentine Justicialist Party (PJ) politician. She was a National Senator representing San Luis Province in the Federal Commitment bloc from 2001 to 2017.

Negre graduated with a law degree at the University of Buenos Aires in 1976 and with a master's in Business Law in 1993 at the Austral University. She had a career in the judicial system and at the state prosecutor's office of San Luis, and is a prolific writer. She was candidate for national deputy in 1999.

Negre de Alonso was appointed to the Senate in March 2001 to complete the term of Alberto Rodríguez Saá and was elected to the Senate later that year, then re-elected in 2005. She is close to her fellow San Luis senator Adolfo Rodríguez Saá, opposing the kirchneristas (followers of Néstor Kirchner) of the Front for Victory. They have formed an alliance with other Peronists from the provinces (Peronismo Federal) opposed to the centralization and authoritarian style of the Kirchners and represents them as the second vice-president of the Senate since February 2008.

Negre de Alonso is a devout Roman Catholic, and a member of Opus Dei. She has opposed liberalising the law on contraception and abortion. She heads the Global Action Network of Legislators and Governors for Life and the Family, bringing together several anti-abortion legislators in Europe and Latin America. She voted against same-sex marriage in 2010.
