= Fabio Biancalani =

Argentine politician (1961–2024)

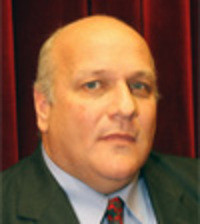
- Biancalani in 2008

National Senator
- In office 10 December 2007 – 10 December 2013
- Preceded by: Mirian Curletti
- Succeeded by: María Inés Pilatti Vergara
- Constituency: Chaco Province

Personal details
- Born: 22 September 1961 Rosario, Santa Fe Province, Argentina
- Died: 26 August 2024 (aged 62) Resistencia, Chaco Province, Argentina
- Party: Justicialist

Fabio Dario Biancalani (22 September 1961 – 26 August 2024) was an Argentine Justicialist Party politician. He sat in the Argentine Senate representing Chaco Province from 2007 to 2013.

== Life and career ==
He was born in Rosario, Santa Fe Province in 1961 and he graduated from the National University of the Northeast with a degree in roadway engineering in 1986. Prior to entering politics, Biancalani ran his family's construction firm.

He first got involved in politics when he became the press officer for the electoral campaign of former Governor of Chaco Florencio Tenev, later on he would participate in the primaries of the Justicialist Party in Chaco. Initially as a candidate to become the Intendant of Resitencia, and finally as a candidate to become National Senator.

Biancalani was elected to the Senate on the Frente Chaco Merece Más party list in 2007, which was part of the majority Front for Victory caucus, he would remain in this position until 2013. In the National Senate he was a member of the following commissions: Homeland Security and Drug Trafficking, Industry and Commerce, Rights and Guarantees, Infrastructure, Housing and Transport, Systems, Media and Freedom of Speech and Support for public works in the Bermejo River.

Biancalani reaped criticism for the cost of road maintenance contract for Chaco's Route 7. The contract had been awarded to the Adelmo Biancalani firm.

In 2008 he voted in favor of the Law on Export Taxes and creation of the Social Redistribution Fund, which raised taxes on agricultural exports, in 2009 he voted in favor of Law 26.522, also known as the Audiovisual media law and in 2010 he abstained from voting on the law that legalized same sex marriage in Argentina.

In 2011 he was a candidate in the Justicialist Party primaries to become the nominee for the Chaco Province gubernatorial elections, competing against the incumbent Governor Jorge Capitanich.

In 2016 he was named as a suspect in the Lazaro Baez Case, due to the investigation of his family's construction firm over suspected tax evasion. In 2020 he was indicted for aggravated tax evasion.

In 2024 the trial against Biancalani, Lazaro Baez and other co-conspirators started. The prosecution argued that the accused had been involved in a tax evasion scheme to create fake invoices of the Adelmo Biancalani and Austral Construcciones construction companies. The prosecutor's office requested a 5-year prison sentence for Biancalani, but due to his death all legal action against him ended before he could be sentenced.

Biancalani died in Resitencia, Chaco on 26 August 2024, after suffering a stroke and two heart attacks. He was 62.
