= Josefina Angélica Meabe =

Argentine politician (1939–2023)

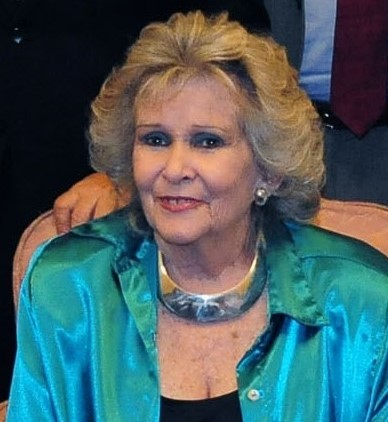
- Meabe in 2012

National Senator
- In office 10 December 2009 – 9 December 2015
- Constituency: Corrientes

Personal details
- Born: Josefina Angélica Meabe Ferré de Mathó; 15 June 1939 Buenos Aires, Argentina
- Died: 31 January 2023 (aged 83) La Paz, Entre Ríos, Argentina
- Party: PLC
- Occupation: Rancher

Josefina Angélica Meabe Ferré de Mathó (15 June 1939 – 31 January 2023) was an Argentine politician and rancher. A member of the Liberal Party of Corrientes, she served in the Senate from 2009 to 2015.

Meabe died in La Paz, Entre Ríos on 31 January 2023, at the age of 83.
