= Arturo Vera =

Argentine politician

National Senator
- In office 10 December 2007 – 9 December 2013
- Constituency: Entre Ríos

Personal details
- Born: 19 March 1946 (age 80) Federal, Entre Ríos Province, Argentina
- Party: Radical Civic Union
- Profession: lawyer

Arturo Vera (born 19 March 1946) is an Argentine Radical Civic Union politician. He was a member of the Argentine Senate representing Entre Ríos Province from 2007 to 2013.

Vera served as a provincial deputy from 1999 to 2003. He was elected to the Senate in 2007, narrowly beating the Socialist Party's Jorge Daneri in the run-off for the third place. He had contested the primary to be the Radical candidate for governor. earlier in the year.
