= Luis Petcoff Naidenoff =

Argentine politician

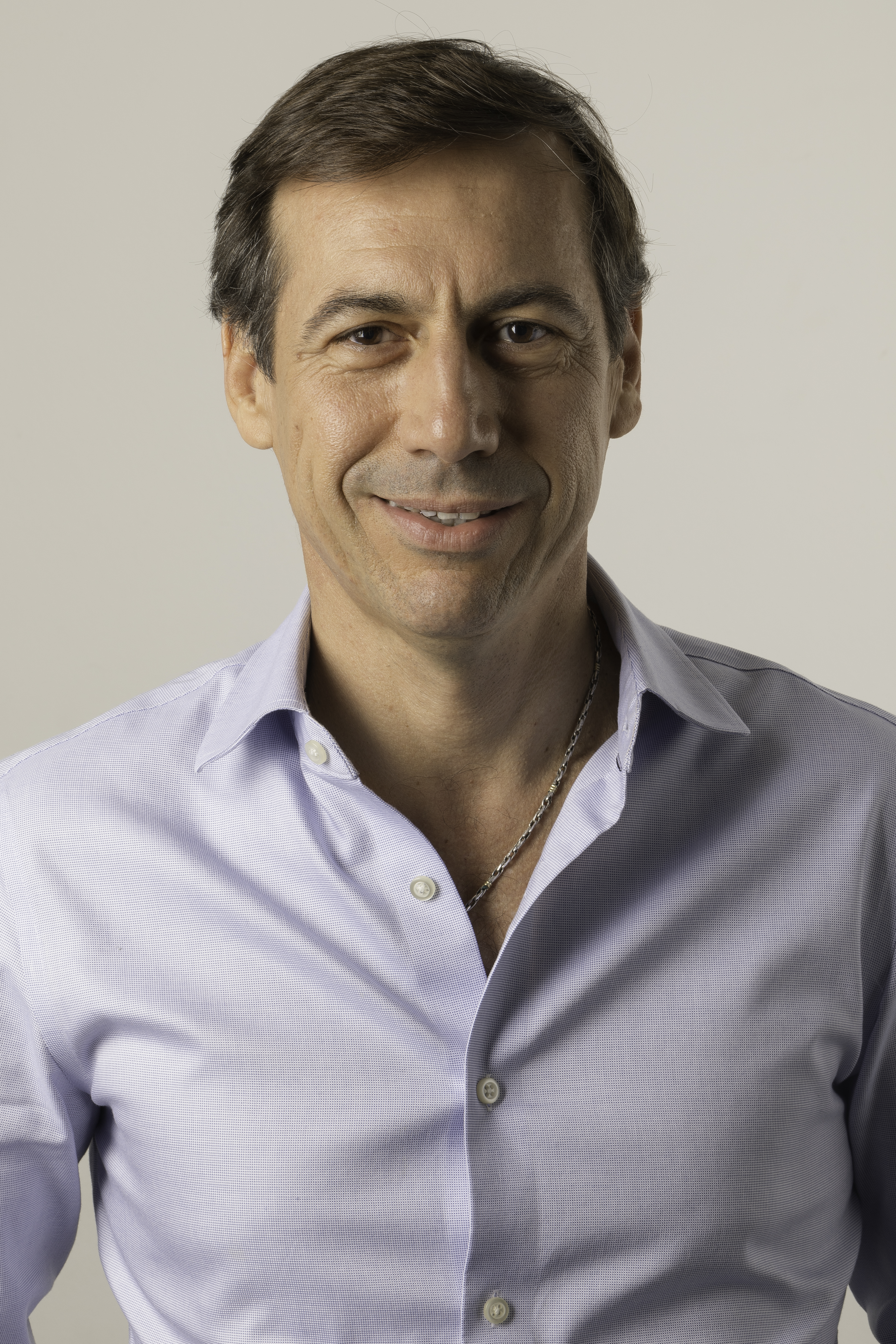

National Senator
- Incumbent
- Assumed office 10 December 2005
- Constituency: Formosa

Personal details
- Born: 13 July 1967 (age 59) El Colorado, Formosa Province, Argentina
- Party: Radical Civic Union
- Other political affiliations: Juntos por el Cambio (2015–present)
- Spouse: Cinthya Sonaridio (died 2018)
- Education: National University of the Northeast
- Profession: Lawyer

Luis Carlos Petcoff Naidenoff (born 13 July 1967) is an Argentine lawyer and politician. He is National Senator and is the leader of the opposition political coalition Juntos por el Cambio in the Senate.

Born in rural El Colorado, Petcoff Naidenoff studied in El Colorado and Corrientes, and graduated as a lawyer at the Universidad Nacional del Nordeste (UNNE). He worked as a lawyer in Formosa. He served as President of the Association of Young Lawyers 1996–98.

Petcoff Naidenoff was elected as a Formosa city councillor in 1999 and headed the UCR caucus, serving until 2003. He was elected to the Argentine Senate in 2005. He was the UCR candidate for Governor of Formosa in 2007, with Ana Elena Caligaris as his running mate; he lost to Gildo Insfrán. Petcoff was elected president of the UCR caucus in the Senate in 2011.

== Personal life ==
Petcoff Naidenoff is of Bulgarian descent. He was married to Cinthya Sonaridio, a fellow graduate of UNNE; they had a daughter and a son. On 18 June 2018, his wife Cinthya and their son were found dead in their home in Formosa. Initial reports suggested they had succumbed to monoxide poisoning.

In 2022 he got engaged to fellow senator Carolina Losada.

== National Senator ==
In 2005 he was elected National Senator for the Province of Formosa and re-elected in 2011 and 2017. He also appeared as a candidate for governor of Formosa in 2007 and 2015, losing both times against Gildo Insfrán, who has governed the province since 1995.

Currently it integrates 15 commissions, being one of the legislators with greater participation in the commissions of the Chamber.

Since 2015 he is the leader of Cambiemos in the Senate of the Nation.

Since its assumption, it presented 262 Draft Law, in addition to numerous communication and declaration projects.

He was recognized with the Parliamentary Award for his legislative activity in the years 2009 and 2016.
