= Ana Corradi =

Argentine politician

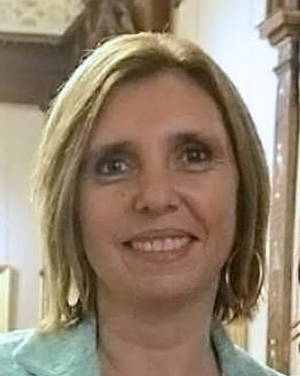
- Corradi in 2014

National Senator
- In office 10 December 2007 – 10 December 2013
- Constituency: Santiago del Estero

Personal details
- Born: April 25, 1962 (age 63) La Banda, Santiago del Estero
- Party: Viable Santiago Movement; Front for Victory
- Spouse: José Alberto Beltrán
- Profession: Teacher, accountant

Ana María Corradi de Beltrán (born 25 April 1962 in La Banda, Santiago del Estero) is an Argentine politician. Elected for the Viable Santiago Movement, she sat in the Argentine Senate representing Santiago del Estero Province in the majority block of the Front for Victory from 2007 to 2013.

Corradi qualified as a pre-school teacher in 1982 and was a nursery teacher from 1983 until 1995. She graduated as a public accountant in 1991 from the Catholic University of Santiago del Estero and was chief of commerce for the La Banda municipality from 1992 then Director of Incomes for the city from 1994 to 1995. From 1995 until 2003 she served as a La Banda councillor before returning to the municipal administration, acting as government secretary 2004–05.

From 23 March 2005, Corradi was a provincial deputy, serving until February 2007. Later that year she was elected to the Argentine Senate and sits in the Front for Victory principally alongside Justicialist Party politicians. Although second on the list, the first candidate of the Viable Santiago Movement, Héctor "Chabay" Ruiz, mayor of La Banda, did not take his Senate seat, leaving Corradi to assume the position.
