= María José Bongiorno =

Argentine politician

National Senator
- In office 10 December 2007 – 10 December 2013
- Preceded by: Amanda Isidori
- Constituency: Río Negro

Personal details
- Party: Frente Grande
- Spouse: Lawyer

María José Bongiorno is an Argentine Frente Grande politician. She sat in the Argentine Senate representing Río Negro Province in the majority block of the Front for Victory from 2007 to 2013.

Bongiorno, a lawyer, is active in the Frente Grande, previously part of the FrePaSo alliance and now part of the ruling Front for Victory of President Cristina Fernández de Kirchner alongside most members of the Justicialist Party. She led the Frente Grande block on the city council of Cipolletti where she was a councillor from 2003.
