= Samuel Cabanchik =

Argentine philosopher, academic and politician

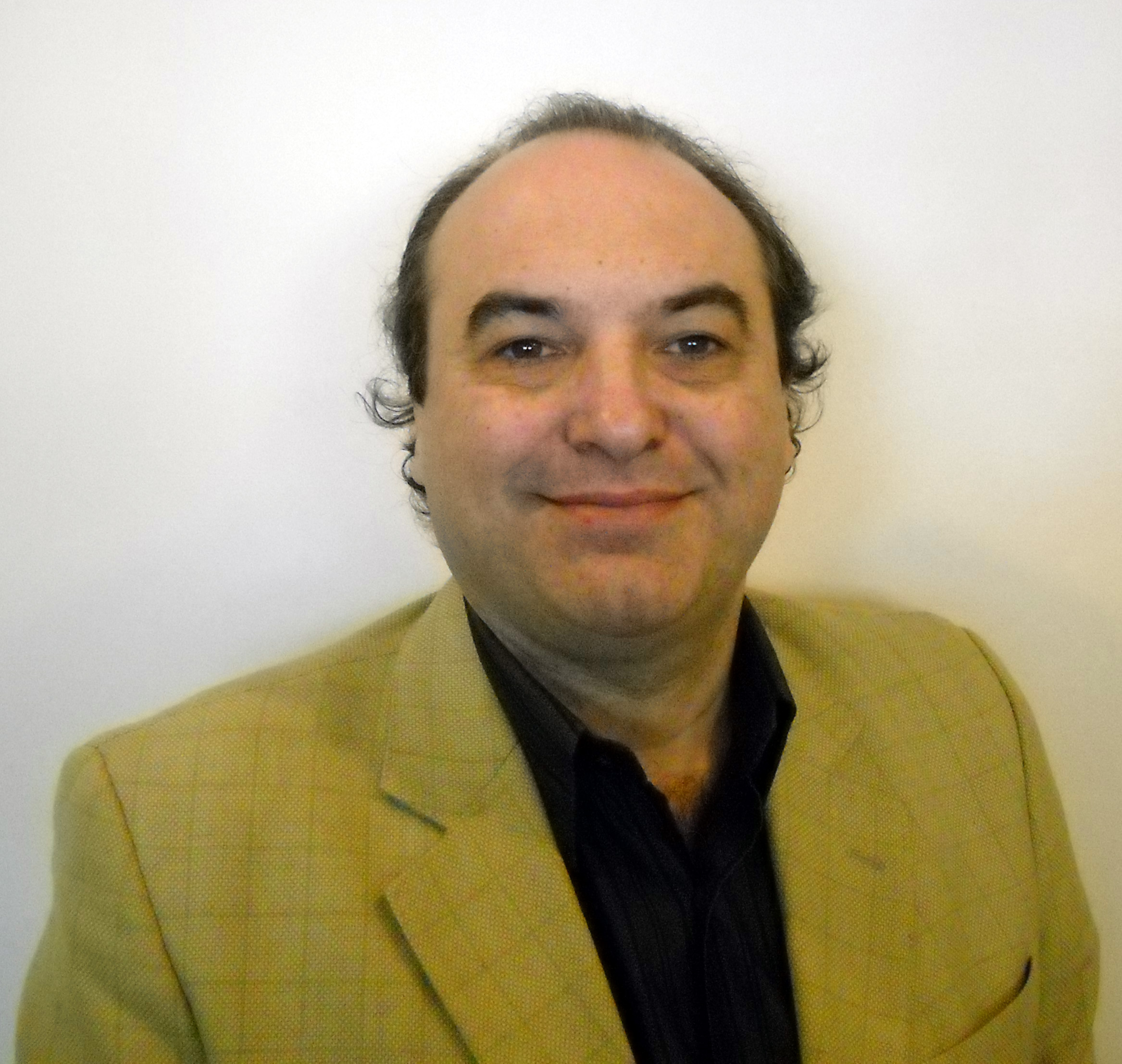

National Senator
- In office 10 December 2007 – 10 December 2013
- Constituency: City of Buenos Aires

Personal details
- Born: August 18, 1958 (age 67)
- Party: Radical Civic Union (formerly); Civic Coalition ARI (until 2009); Federal Buenos Aires Project (since 2009)
- Profession: Philosopher
- Website: blog.cabanchik.org

Samuel, Manuel Cabanchik (born August 18, 1958) is an Argentine philosopher, academic and politician. He was elected to the Argentine Senate in 2007, representing the City of Buenos Aires on the Civic Coalition ticket. He left the Civic Coalition on July 8, 2009, and formed his own parliamentary group, the Federal Buenos Aires Project, and was subsequently considered a circumstantial ally of the Cristina Fernández de Kirchner government.

Cabanchik is a professor of contemporary philosophy at the University of Buenos Aires Faculty of Philosophy and Letters, and conducted research for Conicet, the National Scientific and Technical Research Council. His books include El revés de la filosofía (Buenos Aires, Biblos, 1993), Introducciones a la Filosofía (Barcelona, GEDISA, 2000) and El abandono del Mundo (Buenos Aires, 2006).

Cabanchik was affiliated to the Radical Civic Union but was inactive for several years prior to actively supporting the Civic Coalition of Elisa Carrió. He was elected to the Senate on the list of the Civic Coalition in 2007. On July 8, 2009, he announced he was leaving the Civic Coalition and forming his own parliamentary group, the Federal Buenos Aires Project. He has since become a strong parliamentary ally of President Cristina Fernández de Kirchner.

In 2013, at the end of his Senate term, Cabanchik decided to run for the Buenos Aires City Legislature on the Alternativa Popular ticket, which supported the FPV candidates for the Senate, Daniel Filmus, and the chamber of deputies, Juan Cabandié.
