= Nanci Parrilli =

Argentine politician

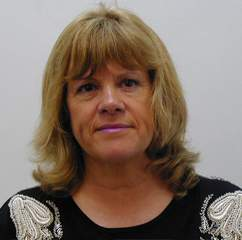

National Senator
- In office 10 December 2007 – 10 December 2013
- Constituency: Neuquén

Personal details
- Born: September 7, 1953 (age 72) San Martín de los Andes
- Party: Justicialist Party
- Profession: Psychology teacher

Nanci María Augustina Parrilli (born 7 September 1953, San Martín de los Andes) is an Argentine Justicialist Party politician. She sat in the Argentine Senate representing Neuquén Province in the majority block of the Front for Victory from 2007 to 2013.

Parrilli attended school in San Martín de los Andes and qualified as a teacher of psychology in Bahía Blanca in 1976. She has extensive experience in the education sector.

Nanci Parrilli was elected to the Senate in 2007.

Parrilli's brother, Oscar Parrilli, was General Secretary of the Presidency for Cristina Fernández de Kirchner, and also served as senator for Neuquén.
