= New Encounter =

Argentine political party

New Encounter Nuevo Encuentro
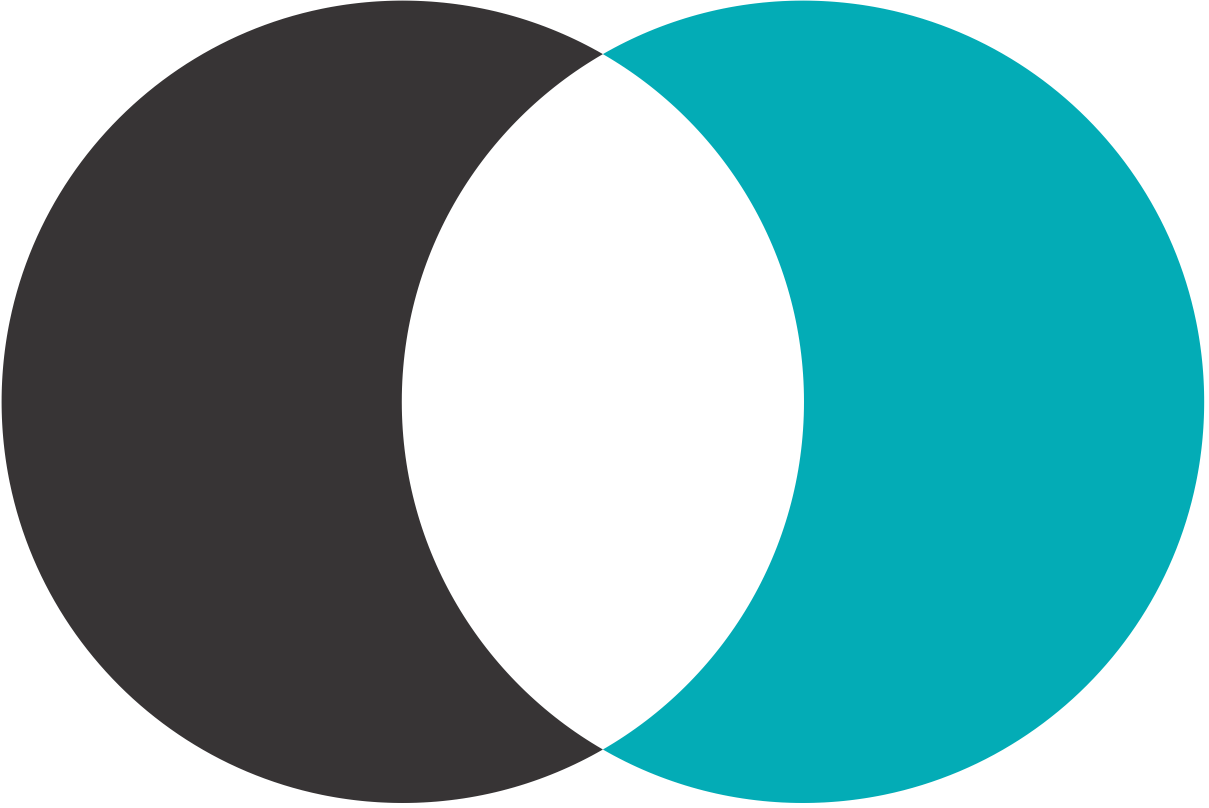
- President: Martín Sabbatella
- 1st Vice President: Hugo Yasky
- General Secretary: Adrián Grana
- Founded: 14 September 2004; 21 years ago
- Youth wing: Juventud Nuevo Encuentro
- Membership (2017): ▲38,459
- Ideology: Social democracy Kirchnerism; Progressivism
- Political position: Centre-left to left-wing
- National affiliation: Homeland Force
- Colors: Turquoise, white and black
- Seats in the Chamber of Deputies: 2 / 257
- Seats in the Senate: 0 / 72

Website
- https://nuevoencuentro.org.ar/

Encounter for Democracy and Equality (Spanish: Encuentro por la Democracia y la Equidad; EDE), more commonly known as New Encounter (Spanish: Nuevo Encuentro) is a Kirchnerist political party in Argentina founded in 2004 by then-mayor of Morón, Martín Sabbatella. The party now forms part of the Unión por la Patria, the coalition which supported former president Alberto Fernández and Sergio Massa's presidential campaign.

From 2009 to 2015, the party was aligned with the Communist Party and the Solidary Party in a front called New Encounter, from which the EDE took its current common name.

== History ==
The Encounter for Democracy and Equality was officially launched as a political party on 14 September 2004 by then-intendente (mayor) of Morón, Martín Sabbatella. Sabbatella had until then led his own local party, called Nuevo Morón ("New Morón"), and had belonged to the Broad Front and been involved with the Communist Party Youth, as well as the Front for a Country in Solidarity (Frepaso). According to Sabbatella, the party was partly inspired by the Uruguayan Broad Front.

In 2009, ahead of the nationwide legislative election, Sabbatella and the EDE formed a coalition with the Communist Party, the Solidary Party, the Freemen of the South Movement, the Workers' Central Union, among others; the coalition was named New Encounter (Spanish: Nuevo Encuentro). Sabbatella ran in the Buenos Aires Province party list as the first candidate, and the coalition eventually won 2,15% of the overall national vote and secured two seats in the Chamber of Deputies (the other elected deputy was Graciela Iturraspe).

Ahead of the 2011 general election, New Encounter officially endorsed Cristina Fernández de Kirchner's bid for re-election, joining the broader Front for Victory.

In 2015, New Encounter, the coalition, finally dissolved due to internal differences between its member parties. In 2017 the EDE, now popularly known as "New Encounter" itself, joined the Citizen's Unity coalition formed by former president Cristina Fernández de Kirchner in the aftermath of Mauricio Macri's victory in the 2015 presidential election and the dissolution of the Front for Victory, rejoining its previous allied parties, but now as part of the pan-kirchnerist coalition. At the 2017 legislative election, the party (which ran under the Citizen's Unity list) got three of its members elected to the Chamber of Deputies: Hugo Yasky (chief of the Workers' Central Union), Mónica Macha, and Gabriela Cerruti.

== Ideology ==
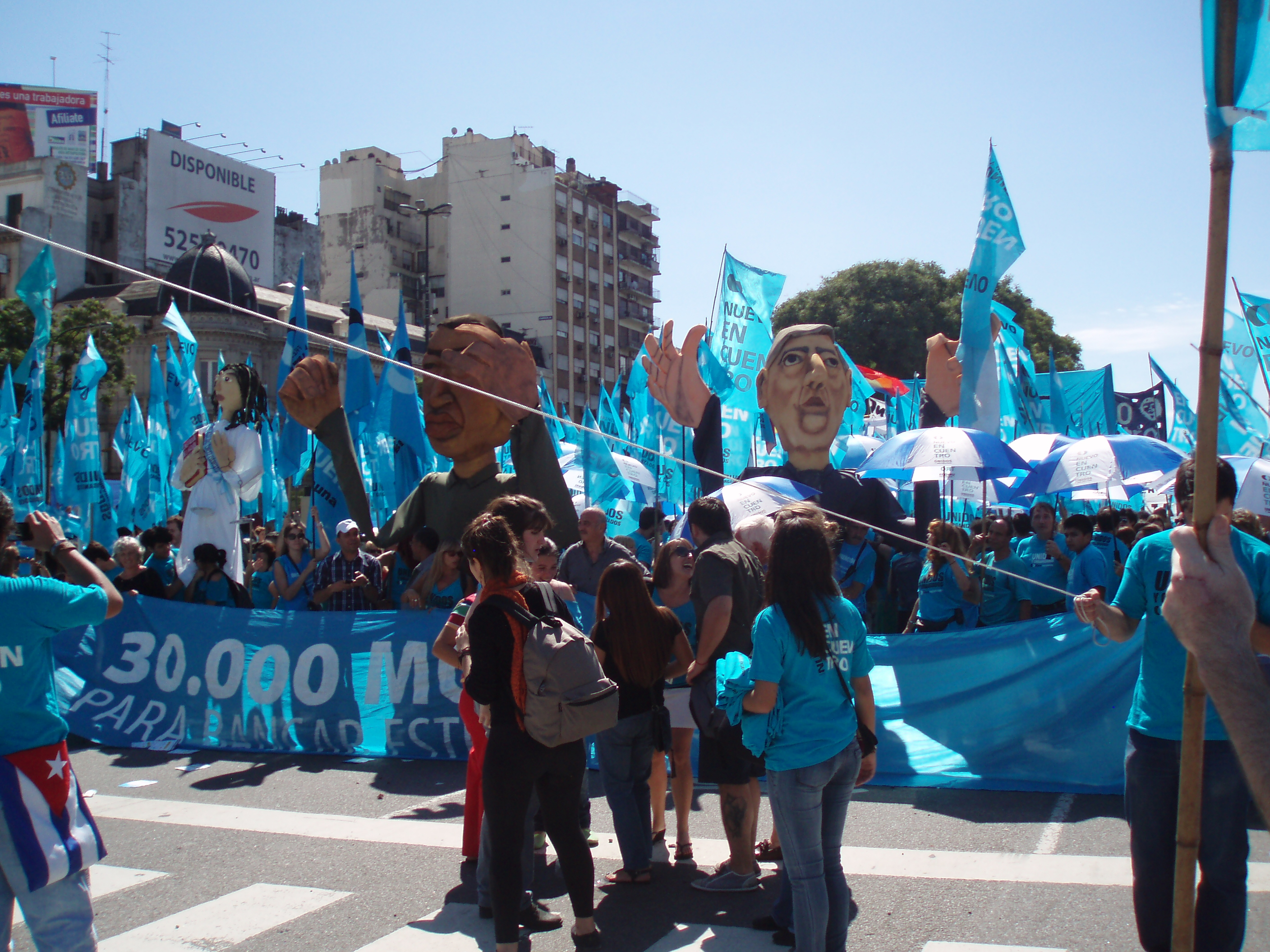
New Encounter supporters in the 2013 Day of Remembrance for Truth and Justice march in Buenos Aires.

At the time of the party's foundation, Argentine media covering it and Sabatella himself described it as a "progressive" group, modelling itself after the Uruguayan Broad Front.

During his time in Congress, Sabbatella voted selectively in favor and against the Front for Victory government's proposed bills, and initially refused to explicitly align New Encounter with Cristina Fernández de Kirchner and her supporters in Congress. However, following Fernández de Kirchner's landslide victory in the 2011 presidential election, Sabbatella declared the party to be "[like] another leg of the Kirchnerist table", meaning the party would officially become part of the government-aligned bloc without "losing its own identity".

== Electoral performance ==
=== President ===
Election year	Candidate	Coalition	1st round		2nd round		Result
Election year	Candidate	Coalition	# of overall votes	% of overall vote	# of overall votes	% of overall vote	Result
2011	Cristina Kirchner	Front for Victory	11,865,055	54.11 (1st)	—N/a		✓ Elected
2015	Daniel Scioli	Front for Victory	9,338,449	37.08 (1st)	12,198,441	48.60 (2nd)	✗ 2-R Defeated
2019	Alberto Fernández	Frente de Todos	12,473,709	48.10 (1st)	—N/a		✓ Elected

=== Chamber of Deputies ===
Election year	Votes	%	seats won	total seats	position	presidency	notes
2009	402,502	21.03 (#6th)	2	5 / 257	Minority	Cristina Fernández de Kirchner (PJ—FPV)	within New Encounter (coalition)
2011	10,762,217	47.98 (#1st)	5	7 / 257	Minority	Cristina Fernández de Kirchner (PJ—FPV)	within Front for Victory
2013	7,775,204	34.41 (#1st)	1	6 / 257	Minority	Cristina Fernández de Kirchner (PJ—FPV)	within Front for Victory
2015	8,797,279	37.41 (#1st)	2	2 / 257	Minority	Mauricio Macri (PRO—Cambiemos)	within Front for Victory
2017	5,265,069	21.03 (#2nd)	3	4 / 257	Minority	Mauricio Macri (PRO—Cambiemos)	within Citizen's Unity
2019	11,359,508	45.50 (#1st)	0	2 / 257	Minority	Alberto Fernández (PJ—FDT)	within Frente de Todos

== See also ==
- Argentine Workers' Central Union
- Carlos Heller
- Front for Victory
