= Ramón Javier Mestre =

Argentine politician (born 1972)

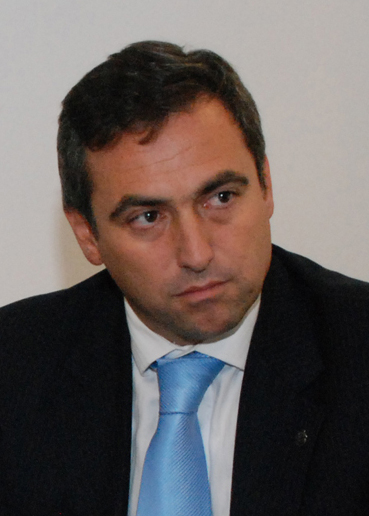

Mayor of Córdoba
- In office December 10, 2011 – 10 December 2019
- Preceded by: Daniel Giacomino
- Succeeded by: Martín Llaryora

National Senator
- In office December 10, 2009 – December 10, 2011
- Constituency: Córdoba

Personal details
- Born: July 2, 1972; Córdoba, Argentina
- Political party: UCR
- Spouse: Melise Gauchat
- Children: 2
- Profession: Lawyer

Ramón Javier Mestre (Córdoba, Argentina, July 2, 1972), is an Argentine lawyer and politician for the Unión Cívica Radical. In the elections of September 2011, he was elected mayor of the city of Córdoba. He would hold this role until 2019.

== Biography ==
He is son of Ramón Bautista Mestre (governor of Córdoba from 1995 to 1999; and mayor of the province capital city from 1983 to 1991).

He became lawyer at the University of Córdoba. Between 2006 and 2008 was president of the Capital Committee for the UCR of Córdoba. In 2007 was elected counselor of his city, role that he occupied up to 2009. In December of that year, he started his term as national senator.

On 18 September 2011, he was elected mayor of the city of Córdoba, against the dissident Peronist Olga Riutort (candidate for Alianza Fuerza de la Gente) and former vice-governor Héctor Campana (Unión por Córdoba). He was re-elected for a second term in 2015.

Because of this, the UCR rules the city for the first time since 1999, the year in which Rubén Martí finished his term as mayor.

Preceded by Daniel Giacomino	Mayor of Córdoba, Córdoba Province; 2011	Succeeded by
