= Juan Carlos Marino (politician) =

Argentine politician (born 1963)

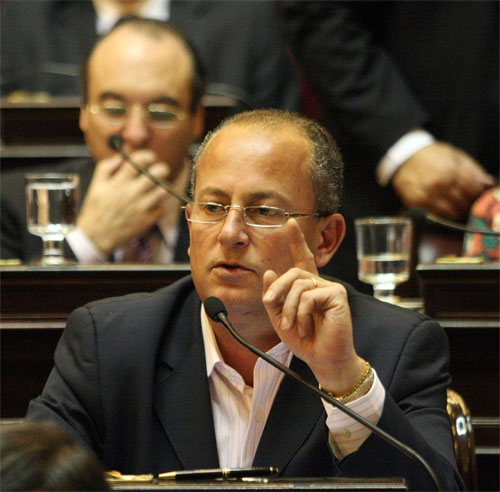

National Senator
- In office 10 December 2003 – 10 December 2021
- Constituency: La Pampa

Mayor of Miguel Riglos
- In office 1995–2003

Personal details
- Born: October 23, 1963 (age 62) Villa Maza, Buenos Aires Province, Argentina
- Party: Radical Civic Union
- Spouse: Daniela García
- Website: Juan Carlos Marino

Juan Carlos Marino (born October 23, 1963) is an Argentine Radical Civic Union (UCR) politician. From 2003 to 2021, he sat in the Argentine Senate representing La Pampa Province.

== Biography ==
Born in rural Villa Maza, Buenos Aires Province, Marino grew up in nearby Miguel Riglos, La Pampa Province. A farmer in his youth, he became active in politics in 1983 as a member of the local chapter of the centrist UCR; the party's standard bearer, Raúl Alfonsín, had just been elected President of Argentina after a 7-year dictatorship. He married Daniela García, and they had two daughters.

Marino held several party positions and in 1991 was elected to the City Council. He was elected Mayor of Miguel Riglos in 1995 with 53% of the vote, becoming the town's first UCR figure to be elected to the position; he was re-elected in 1999 with 74% of the vote. Marino was elected to the Argentine Senate for La Pampa in 2003. He was appointed secretary of the UCR caucus in the Senate in 2005.

Marino was nominated as candidate for Governor of La Pampa in 2007 as the top of the FrePam (Frente Pampeano Cívico y Social) ticket, a coalition between the provincial UCR, Socialist Party, FreGen, MID, and dissident members of ARI. He was defeated by Justicialist Party nominee Oscar Jorge by 17%, however.

Marino was re-elected to the Senate in 2009, and in 2010 became 1st vice-president of the Senate (the body's second-highest post). He ran for governor on the FrePam ticket again in 2011, but was again defeated by Oscar Jorge (the incumbent) by 15%. He was re-elected to the Senate in 2015.

Marino did not run for a fourth term in the Senate in 2021, and his term expired on 10 December 2021.
