= José Manuel Cano =

Argentine politician (born 1965)

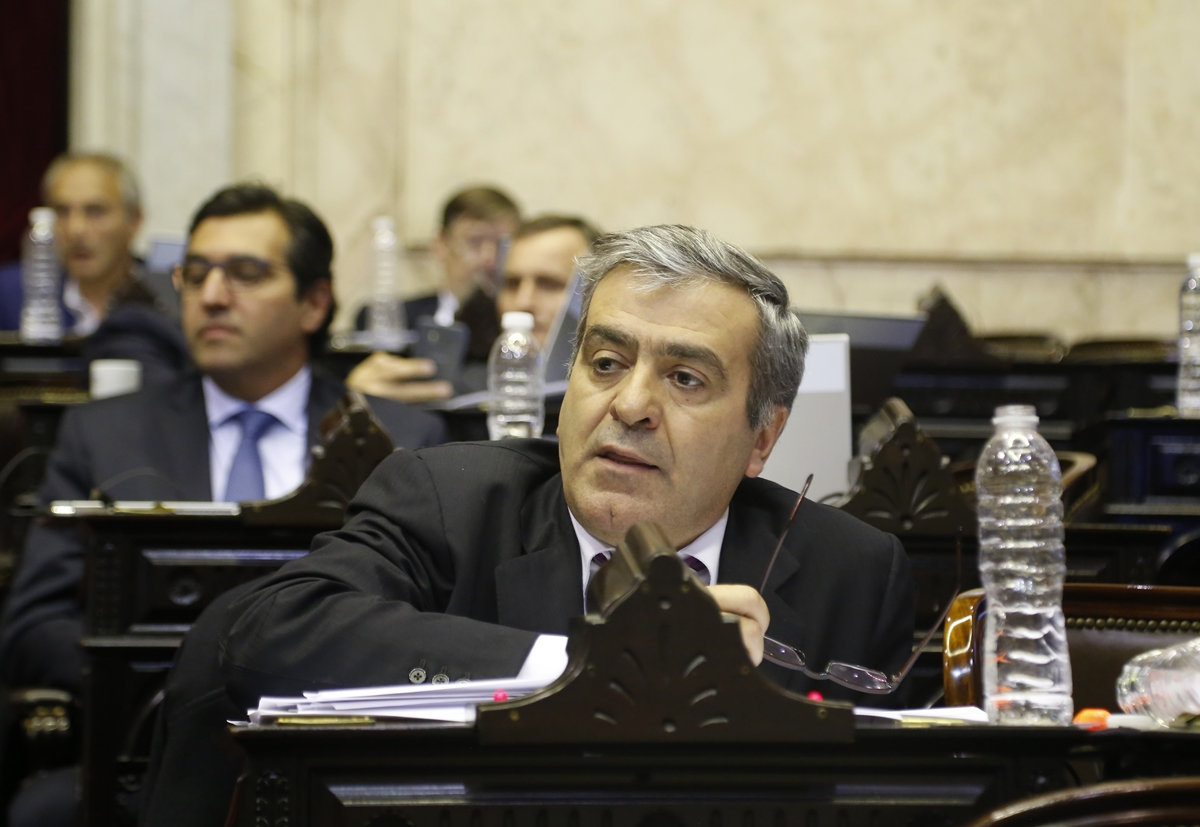

National Deputy
- In office 10 December 2017 – 10 December 2021
- Constituency: Tucumán
- In office 10 December 2013 – 10 December 2015
- Constituency: Tucumán

National Senator
- In office 10 December 2009 – 10 December 2013

Provincial Legislator of Tucumán
- In office 27 October 2003 – 2 December 2009
- Constituency: I – Capital

Personal details
- Born: 15 July 1965 (age 61) San Miguel de Tucumán, Argentina
- Party: Radical Civic Union
- Other political affiliations: Social and Civic Agreement (2009–2011); Juntos por el Cambio (since 2015)
- Education: National University of Tucumán

José Manuel Cano (born 15 July 1965) is an Argentine dentist and politician of the Radical Civic Union (UCR). He was a National Deputy from 2013 to 2015, and later from 2017 to 2021. He also served as a National Senator for his home province of Tucumán from 2009 to 2013.

Cano has also served as secretary general of the UCR National Committee and as a member of the Tucumán provincial legislature.

== Early and personal life ==
Cano was born on 15 July 1965 in San Miguel de Tucumán. He studied dentistry at the National University of Tucumán (UNT), graduating in 1991. While studying at UNT, Cano was active in student politics and was president of the Faculty of Dentistry student union.

He is married to Ruth Adriana Mira and has three children.

== Political career ==
Cano was elected to the Legislature of Tucumán Province in 2003 as part of the Radical Civic Union. He was re-elected for a second term in 2007. In 2009, Cano ran for one of Tucumán's three seats in the National Senate as the first candidate in the Social and Civic Agreement list. The list received 15.92% of the vote, and was the second-most voted in the province, allowing Cano to be elected for the minority seat. Starting on 10 December 2012, he was president of the UCR parliamentary bloc in the Senate.

In 2011, he ran for governor of Tucumán as the UCR candidate against incumbent José Alperovich, of the Justicialist Party. He lost and came in a distant second place, with 14% of the vote against Alperovich's 69%.

In the 2013 election, Cano ran for a seat in the Chamber of Deputies, again as part of the Social and Civic Agreement list. With 34.68% of the vote, the list received enough votes for Cano to be elected. He resigned from his seat in the Senate and was sworn in as deputy on 10 December 2013. His seat in the Senate was filled in by Silvia Elías de Pérez. Cano would once again be the UCR candidate to the governorship of Tucumán in 2015, and once again, he lost to the Justicialist Party candidate, Juan Luis Manzur. Cano received 39.94% against Manzur's 51.64%.

From 2015 to 2017, he led Plan Belgrano, an infrastructure programme for provinces of the Argentine North established by the government of President Mauricio Macri. Cano resigned from his seat in the Chamber of Deputies on 10 December 2015 in order to take charge of the programme, and his vacancy was filled by Federico Masso. In 2017, he was accused of graft and asking for bribes by federal judge Sergio Torres.

Cano once again ran for a seat in the lower house in the 2017 legislative election, this time as part of the Cambiemos list, which received 32.56% of the vote.

During this term, Cano formed part of the parliamentary commissions on Social Action and Public Health, Maritime Interests, Budget and Finances, Addiction Prevention, and Internal Security, and presided the commission on Transport. He was an opponent of the legalisation of abortion in Argentina, voting against the two Voluntary Interruption of Pregnancy bills that were debated by the Argentine Congress in 2018 and 2020.

In 2024 he publicly defended Gerardo Morales for the imprisonment of two men for making publications on social networks about the alleged infidelity of his wife, Tulia Snopek.
