= Horacio Lores =

Argentine politician

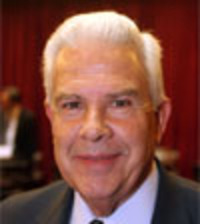

National Senator
- In office 10 December 2007 – 10 December 2013
- Constituency: Neuquén

Personal details
- Born: 13 July 1939 (age 86)
- Party: Neuquén People's Movement
- Spouse: Gladys Aguilera
- Profession: Medical doctor

Horacio Lores (born 16 July 1939) is an Argentine politician of the Neuquén People's Movement (MPN). He sat in the Argentine Senate representing Neuquén Province from 2007 to 2013.

Lores qualified as a doctor in 1964 from the University of Buenos Aires, specialising in public health. He interned at the Regional Hospital of Mar del Plata and from 1965 was a rural doctor in various places in Neuquén, meeting his wife in Andacollo and joining the MPN. From 1971 until 1979 he served in various technical roles at the health department of the province. In 1980 he became director of the Bouquet Roldán Hospital in Neuquén City. His career in medical administration continued, as Head of Epidemiology for the province from 1982 until 1983.

In 1983, Lores took a political position as subsecretary of health for Neuquén province serving until 1987 under Governor Felipe Sapag. He consulted for the national Ministry of Health and the Pan American Health Organization (PAHO) before returning to the provincial government's as Neuquén's Minister of Health and Social Action from 1991, then Minister of Government and Justice from 1993 until 1994. Subsequently, he continued his work at PAHO in Peru then became director of the Private Community Hospital of Mar del Plata in 1997 until 2003. Lores has also taught extensively including as visiting professor at the Cayetano Heredia University.

From 2004, Lores became involved once again in politics, working with Jorge Sobisch heading the campaigns of 2006 and 2007. He was elected to the Senate in 2007 for the Neuquino People's Movement, thirteen years after his last period in public office in the province.
