= Roxana Latorre =

Argentine politician

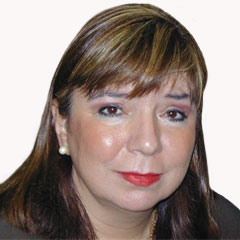

National Senator
- In office 10 December 2001 – 10 December 2015
- Constituency: Santa Fe

National Deputy
- In office 10 December 1997 – 10 December 2001
- Constituency: Santa Fe

Personal details
- Born: 10 May 1952 (age 73) Rosario
- Party: Justicialist Party
- Profession: Teacher

Roxana Itatí Latorre (born 10 May 1952, Rosario) is an Argentine Justicialist Party politician. She was a member of the Argentine Senate representing Santa Fe Province from 2001 to 2015.

Latorre was educated in Rosario and worked extensively as a teacher. She served Governor Carlos Reutemann as subsecretary of administrative reform for Santa Fe, then was provincial director of the Third Age 1995–1997.

Latorre was elected as a national deputy for Santa Fe in 1997. She was elected to the Senate in 2001 and was re-elected in 2003 for a six-year term. She attempted to become a candidate for the governorship of Santa Fe against her own party ahead of the 2007 elections but dropped out in July 2007.

In February 2009, after Reutemann, also a Justicialist Senator from Santa Fe and her political mentor, announced he was quitting the pro-government Front for Victory block in the Senate, Latorre followed him and announced her break with the block as well, in a political blow to President Cristina Fernández de Kirchner and her husband, Justicialist Party president, and ex-president of the Republic, Néstor Kirchner.
