= Mario Cimadevilla =

Argentine politician (born 1954)

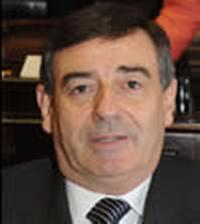
Mario Cimadevilla

Mario Cimadevilla (born March 9, 1954, in Trelew) is an Argentine politician who served as a national senator for Chubut Province from 2009 to 2015. He is a member of the Radical Civic Union.
