= Blanca Osuna =

Argentine politician (born 1950)

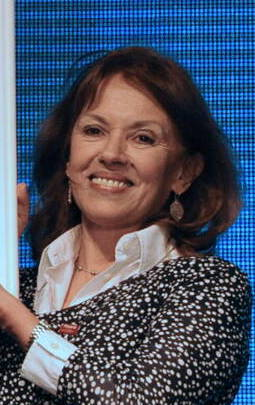

National Deputy
- Incumbent
- Assumed office 10 December 2019
- Constituency: Entre Ríos
- In office 10 December 2001 – 10 December 2007
- Constituency: Entre Ríos

Mayor of Paraná
- In office 10 December 2011 – 10 December 2015
- Preceded by: José Carlos Halle
- Succeeded by: Sergio Varisco

National Senator
- In office 10 December 2007 – 10 December 2011
- Constituency: Entre Ríos

Personal details
- Born: October 25, 1950 (age 75) Paraná, Entre Ríos Province, Argentina
- Party: Justicialist Party
- Profession: Educational psychologist
- Website: senadoraosuna.blogspot.com

Blanca Inés Osuna (born 25 October 1950) is an Argentine Justicialist Party politician. She has been a National Deputy for Entre Ríos Province since 2019, having held the position before from 2001 to 2007. She was also a National Senator representing the same province from 2007 to 2011, and served as intendente (mayor) of Paraná from 2011 to 2015.

Osuna qualified as an educational psychologist at the Catholic University of Argentina in 1984. She taught at the National University of Entre Ríos until 1986 and served on the provincial council of education between 1987 and 1991, latterly chairing the body. She worked as an educational psychologist in the province until 1995 when she became director general of schools for Entre Ríos until 1999.

Osuna was elected to the Argentine Chamber of Deputies in 2001 and was re-elected in 2005. From 2006, she chaired the Education Committee of the Lower House. She was elected to the Senate in 2007 and chairs the Education and Culture Committee of the Senate. In 2011 she was elected Mayor of Paraná, Entre Ríos.

Osuna was made Cavalieri dell’Ordine al Merito della Republica Italiana by the President of Italy in 2005.
