= Juan Pérez Alsina =

Argentine politician

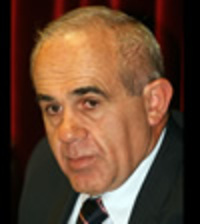

National Senator
- In office 10 December 2007 – 10 December 2013
- Constituency: Salta

Personal details
- Born: 8 March 1954 (age 72)
- Party: Salta Renewal Party
- Spouse: Lawyer

Juan Agustín Pérez Alsina (born 8 March 1954) is an Argentine politician of the Salta Renewal Party. He sat in the Argentine Senate representing Salta Province in support of the majority block of the Front for Victory from 2007 to 2013.

Pérez Alsina qualified as a lawyer from the Catholic University of Salta and worked as a lawyer, lecturer and legal adviser. From 1989 to 1995 he was a councillor in Salta, president of the council from 1991 to 1992.

In 2006, Pérez Alsina was named president of the convention of the Salta Renewal Party (PRS). The PRS has seen an acrimonious split in recent years and Pérez Alsina represents the new Kirchnerist leadership which supports the government of President Cristina Fernández de Kirchner. In 2007 he was elected to the Argentine Senate on the PRS/Front for Victory list.
