= 2000 Buenos Aires City elections =

- Mayoral election
- 7 May 2000
- Turnout: 73.20%
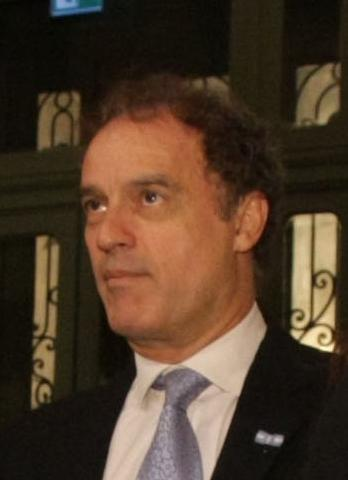

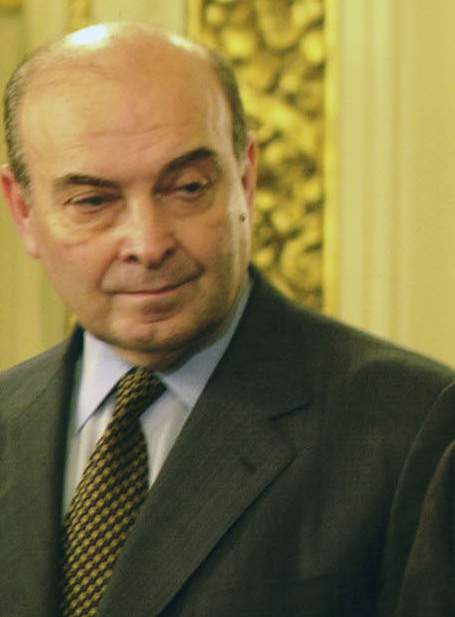

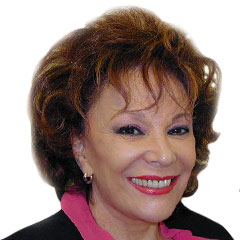
Nominee	Aníbal Ibarra	Domingo Cavallo	Irma Roy
Party	Broad Front	AR	PAIS
Alliance	Alliance	EplC	–
Running mate	Cecilia Felgueras	Gustavo Béliz	José Castiñeira de Dios
Popular vote	884,883	595,775	82,482
Percentage	49.30%	33.20%	4.59%
- Results of the Chief of Government election by electoral circuit.
Chief of Government before election
Enrique Olivera
UCR–Alliance
Elected Chief of Government
Aníbal Ibarra
FG–Alliance
- City Legislature
- 7 May 2000
- All 60 seats in the City Legislature
- Turnout: 73.20%
Party	Leader	Vote %	Seats	+/–
Alliance	Aníbal Ibarra	36.66	24	−13
EplC	Domingo Cavallo	30.82	20	+9
PAIS	Irma Roy	6.68	4	+4
IU	Patricia Walsh	4.43	2	+2
Ucedé	Álvaro Alsogaray	4.16	2	+2
BApT	Antonio Cartañá	2.98	2	New
MJyD	Jorge Daniel Mercado	2.98	2	+2
PGI	Juliana Marino	2.67	1	New
PHE	Lía Méndez	2.22	1	+1
PJ	Raúl Granillo Ocampo	2.09	1	−10
FUT-PO	Jorge Altamira	2.05	1	+1
This lists parties that won seats. See the complete results below.

General elections were held in the City of Buenos Aires on 7 May 2000 to elect the Chief of Government (mayor) and entirety of the City Legislature.

In the mayoral election, former prosecutor Aníbal Ibarra, of the Alliance, won in the first round of voting with 49.30% of the vote. According to the city's constitution, a candidate for Chief of Government must achieve over 50% of the vote in order to win in the first round, and thus Ibarra should have gone on to face the second-most voted candidate, former economy minister Domingo Cavallo of Action for the Republic. Cavallo had initially angrily denied the first round's results, which he called "a fraud". However, following backlash against his comments from other candidates, he dropped out of the race for the second round and ceded victory to Ibarra.

This was only the second general election in the City of Buenos Aires and the first since the adoption of the 1996 Constitution.

== Background ==
The 1996 elections in Buenos Aires were the first held in the city's history to elect local authorities, following the 1994 amendment of the Constitution of Argentina which granted autonomy to the city and allowed it to vote for its own head of government and legislature. The election resulted saw Radical Civic Union senator Fernando de la Rúa become the city's first democratically-elected mayor and the FREPASO coalition of progressive and left-leaning parties become the largest bloc in the Constitutional Convention, which was tasked with writing and adopting a new Constitution for the newly-autonomous city.

Once the new constitution was adopted, legislative elections were held in 1997 to elect the city's first legislature. The newly formed Alliance between the Radical Civic Union and FREPASO won in a landslide with 56.03% of the votes, taking 37 out of 60 seats, while the Justicialist Party and Action for the Republic trailed behind and won 11 seats each.

In 1999, De la Rúa ran and won the country's presidential election, taking office on 10 December 1999. Deputy Chief of Government Enrique Olivera was then sworn in as the city's second Chief of Government. Ahead of the 2000 election, Olivera declined to run for re-election and instead the Alliance's candidate was elected in an internal primary. The winner of said primary was former prosecutor and deputy Aníbal Ibarra, of the Broad Front.

== Candidates ==
Coalition	Mayoral candidate (party) Prior political experience	Vice mayoral candidate (party) Prior political experience	Parties
	Aníbal Ibarra (FG); City Legislator (1997–2000)	Cecilia Felgueras (UCR); Secretary of Social Development (1999–2000)	Frepaso; UCR; Ucedé; MJyJ; PGI
	Domingo Cavallo (AR); Minister of Economy (1991–1996)	Gustavo Béliz (ND); City Legislator (1997–2000)	AR; ND; PD; PF; PPI; PJEA
	Irma Roy (PAIS); National Deputy (1987–1999)	José Castiñeira de Dios (PAIS)	PAIS
	Patricia Walsh (MST)	Herman Schiller (Ind.)	MST; PC
	Antonio Cartañá (Ind.); Ombudsman of Buenos Aires (1988–1993)	Jorge Selser (PSA)	PSA; PDLC

== Results ==
=== Chief of Government ===
Candidate	Running mate	Party	Votes	%
Aníbal Ibarra	Cecilia Felgueras	Alliance for Work, Justice and Education	884,883	49.42
Domingo Cavallo	Gustavo Béliz	Encounter for the City	595,775	33.28
Irma Roy	José Castiñeira de Dios	Open Policy for Social Integrity	82,482	4.61
Patricia Walsh	Herman Schiller	United Left	61,578	3.44
Antonio Cartañá	Jorge Selser	Buenos Aires for All	49,855	2.78
Lía Méndez	Oscar Cevey	Humanist Ecologist Party	30,835	1.72
Raúl Granillo Ocampo	Aníbal Jozami	Justicialist Party	30,096	1.68
Pablo Rieznik	Hugo Villamil	Workers' Unity Front	25,968	1.45
Susana Sacchi	Gustavo de Biase	Socialist Workers' Party	8,447	0.47
Laura Enda Marrone	Jorge Guidobono Rey	Movement for Socialism	8,198	0.46
Manuel Gaggero Pérez	Marcelo Frondizi	Free Fatherland Current	5,321	0.30
Federico Pinto Kramer	Juana A. Caparroz	White Party	3,992	0.22
Antonio Montenegro	Miguel Calvete	Citizen Action	2,951	0.16
Total			1,790,381	100.00
Valid votes			1,790,381	96.01
Invalid votes			25,422	1.36
Blank votes			48,896	2.62
Total votes			1,864,699	100.00
Registered voters/turnout			2,553,361	73.03

=== Legislature ===
Distribution of seats in the City Legislature following the 2000 election: Alliance (24) Action for the Republic (20) Open Policy for Social Integrity (4) Union of the Democratic Centre (2) Buenos Aires for All (2) United Left (2) Movement of Pensioners and Youth (2) Humanist Party (1) Justicialist Party (1) Party of the Intermediate Generation (1) FUT-PO (1)

Party	Votes	%	Seats
Alliance for Work, Justice and Education	652,182	36.67	24
Encounter for the City	548,324	30.83	20
Open Policy for Social Integrity	118,795	6.68	4
United Left	78,746	4.43	2
Union of the Democratic Centre	74,061	4.16	2
Buenos Aires for All	53,044	2.98	2
Movement of Pensioners and Youth	53,023	2.98	2
Party of the Intermediate Generation	47,473	2.67	1
Humanist Ecologist Party	39,553	2.22	1
Justicialist Party	37,259	2.09	1
Workers' Unity Front	36,419	2.05	1
Socialist Workers' Party	10,591	0.60	0
Movement for Socialism	9,531	0.54	0
Free Fatherland Current	6,161	0.35	0
Constitutional Nationalist Party	5,662	0.32	0
White Party	4,549	0.26	0
Citizen Action	3,364	0.19	0
Total	1,778,737	100.00	60
Valid votes	1,778,737	95.17	
Invalid votes	25,101	1.34	
Blank votes	65,175	3.49	
Total votes	1,869,013	100.00	
Registered voters/turnout	2,553,361	73.20	

== See also ==
- 1994 amendment of the Constitution of Argentina
- List of mayors and chiefs of government of Buenos Aires
