= List of Argentine deputies, 2003–2005 =

This is list of members of the Argentine Chamber of Deputies from 10 December 2003 to 9 December 2005.

== Composition ==
=== By province ===
Province	Deputies	Population (2010)
Buenos Aires	70	15,625,084
Buenos Aires City	25	2,890,151
Catamarca	5	367,828
Chaco	7	1,053,466
Chubut	5	506,668
Córdoba	18	3,304,825
Corrientes	7	993,338
Entre Ríos	9	1,236,300
Formosa	5	527,895
Jujuy	6	672,260
La Pampa	5	316,940
La Rioja	5	331,847
Mendoza	10	1,741,610
Misiones	7	1,097,829
Neuquén	5	550,334
Río Negro	5	633,374
Salta	7	1,215,207
San Juan	6	680,427
San Luis	5	431,588
Santa Cruz	5	272,524
Santa Fe	19	3,200,736
Santiago del Estero	7	896,461
Tierra del Fuego	5	126,190
Tucumán	9	1,448,200

=== By political groups ===
as of 9 December 2005

Bloc	Seats
Justicialist	94
Radical Civic Union	45
Federal Peronist	34
ARI	10
People's Movement Front	7
Socialist Party	6
Convergence	4
Encounter	4
Neuquén People's Movement	4
Bonaerense People's Front	3
Republican Force	3
Federalist Unity	3
Commitment to Change	2
Civic and Social Front	2
Frepaso	2
New Party	2
Salta Renewal Party	2
People's Peronism	2
Single-member blocs	28
Source: hcdn.gov.ar (archived)

== Election cycles ==
Election	Term	
Election	Start	End
2001	10 December 2001	9 December 2005
2003	10 December 2003	9 December 2007

== List of deputies ==
Province	Deputy	Party	Term	
Province	Deputy	Party	From	To
Buenos Aires	Elda Susana Agüero	Federal Peronist	2003	2007
Buenos Aires	Guillermo Eduardo Alchouron	Action for the Republic	2003	2007
Buenos Aires	Juan José Álvarez	Federal Peronist	2003	2007
Buenos Aires	Isabel Amanda Artola	Bonaerense People's Front	2003	2007
Buenos Aires	Alfredo Néstor Atanasof	Federal Peronist	2003	2007
Buenos Aires	Daniel Armando Basile	Federal Peronist	2001	2005
Buenos Aires	Sergio Ariel Basteiro	Socialist Party	2001	2005
Buenos Aires	Marcela Alejandra Bianchi Silvestre	Justicialist	2001	2005
Buenos Aires	Jesús Abel Blanco	Federal Peronist	2001	2005
Buenos Aires	Juan Carlos Bonacorsi	Federalist Unity Party	2003	2007
Buenos Aires	Carlos Ramón Brown	Federal Peronist	2001	2005
Buenos Aires	Mario Alejandro Cafiero	Popular Sovereignty	2001	2005
Buenos Aires	Eduardo Oscar Camaño	Federal Peronist	2003	2007
Buenos Aires	Graciela Camaño	Federal Peronist	2003	2007
Buenos Aires	Pascual Cappelleri	Radical Civic Union	2001	2005
Buenos Aires	Daniel Carbonetto	MMTA	2001	2005
Buenos Aires	Jorge Osvaldo Casanovas	Federal Peronist	2001	2005
Buenos Aires	Lilia Estrella Marina Cassese	Federal Peronist	2004 (Note: Since 2 March 2004. Resigned from her 2001–2005 term to replace José Antonio Pampuro. Replaced by José Antonio Romero.)	2007
Buenos Aires	Alicia Amalia Castro	Front for Change	2001	2005
Buenos Aires	Nora Alicia Chiacchio	Federal Peronist	2003	2007
Buenos Aires	Luis Francisco Jorge Cicogna	Justicialist	2001	2005
Buenos Aires	Juan Carlos Correa	Federal Peronist	2001	2005
Buenos Aires	Roberto Raúl Costa	Radical Civic Union	2003	2007
Buenos Aires	Alberto Agustín Coto	Justicialist	2001	2005
Buenos Aires	Fabián De Nuccio	ARI	2003 (Note: Since 17 December 2003. Replaced Rubén Giustiniani.)	2005
Buenos Aires	Carlos Francisco Dellepiane	Argentina With Values	2003	2007
Buenos Aires	Oscar Jorge Di Landro	Federal Peronist	2003	2007
Buenos Aires	José María Díaz Bancalari	Federal Peronist	2003	2007
Buenos Aires	María Nélida Doga	Federal Peronist	2003	2007
Buenos Aires	María del Carmen Falbo	Justicialist	2003	2004 (Note: Resigned on 11 August 2004. Replaced by Aníbal Jesús Stella.)
Buenos Aires	Gustavo Enrique Ferri	Federal Peronist	2003	2007
Buenos Aires	Alejandro Oscar Filomeno	Frepaso	2001	2005
Buenos Aires	Hugo Alberto Franco	Bonaerense People's Front	2003	2007
Buenos Aires	Rodolfo Aníbal Frigeri	Federal Peronist	2001	2005
Buenos Aires	Jorge Antonio Garrido Arceo	Bonaerense People's Front	2003	2007
Buenos Aires	Hilda Beatriz González de Duhalde	Federal Peronist	2003	2005 (Note: Resigned on 9 December 2005 to take office as National Senator. Replaced by Adriana Elsa Coirini.)
Buenos Aires	Francisco Virgilio Gutiérrez	Social Pole	2001	2005
Buenos Aires	Ricardo Javier Jano	Radical Civic Union	2003	2007
Buenos Aires	Margarita Ofelia Jarque	Encounter	2001	2005
Buenos Aires	Jorge Alberto Landau	Federal Peronist	2003	2007
Buenos Aires	Juan Carlos López	Popular Encounter	2004 (Note: Since 2 March 2004. Replaced Melchor Posse.)	2005
Buenos Aires	Eduardo Gabriel Macaluse	ARI	2001	2005
Buenos Aires	Marta Olinda Maffei	ARI	2003	2007
Buenos Aires	Nélida Mabel Mansur	Federalist Unity Party	2003	2007
Buenos Aires	Carlos Alberto Martínez	Federal Peronist	2002 (Note: Since 9 May 2002. Replaced Graciela Camaño.)	2005
Buenos Aires	Silvia Virginia Martínez	Federal Peronist	2001	2005
Buenos Aires	María Lucrecia Monteagudo	Intransigent Party	2001	2005
Buenos Aires	Nilda Beatriz Morales	People's Movement Front	2001	2005
Buenos Aires	Leopoldo Raúl Guido Moreau	Radical Civic Union	2001	2005
Buenos Aires	María Graciela Ocaña	Independent	2003	2006 (Note: Resigned on 6 September 2006. Replaced by Elsa Siria Quiroz.)
Buenos Aires	Patricia Ester Panzoni	Radical Civic Union	2003	2007
Buenos Aires	José Adrián Pérez	ARI	2003	2007
Buenos Aires	Mirta Susana Pérez	Federal Peronist	2003	2007
Buenos Aires	Melchor Ángel Posse	People's Movement Front	2001	2004 (Note: Died on 16 January 2004. Replaced by Juan Carlos López.)
Buenos Aires	Ricardo Rapetti	Justicialist	2002 (Note: Since 13 March 2002. Replaced Jorge Remes Lenicov.)	2005
Buenos Aires	Antonio Ubaldo Rattin	Federalist Unity Party	2001	2005
Buenos Aires	María del Carmen Cecilia Rico	People's Movement Front	2001	2005
Buenos Aires	Jorge Rivas	Socialist Party	2001	2005
Buenos Aires	Marcela Virginia Rodríguez	ARI	2001	2005
Buenos Aires	Oscar Ernesto Ronaldo Rodríguez	Federal Peronist	2003	2007
Buenos Aires	José Antonio Romero	Federal Peronist	2004 (Note: Since 23 March 2004. Replaced Marina Cassese.)	2005
Buenos Aires	Mirta Elsa Rubini	Federal Peronist	2001	2005
Buenos Aires	Carlos Federico Ruckauf	Federal Peronist	2003	2007
Buenos Aires	Juan Carlos Sluga	Justicialist	2003	2007
Buenos Aires	Aníbal Jesús Stella	Federal Peronist	2004 (Note: Since 11 August 2004. Replaced María del Carmen Falbo.)	2007
Buenos Aires	Margarita Rosa Stolbizer	Radical Civic Union	2001	2005
Buenos Aires	Federico Teobaldo Manuel Storani	Radical Civic Union	2003	2007
Buenos Aires	Hugo David Toledo	Federal Peronist	2003	2007
Buenos Aires	Rosa Ester Tulio	Federal Peronist	2003	2007
Buenos Aires	Saúl Ubaldini	Justicialist	2001	2005
Buenos Aires	Jorge Antonio Villaverde	Federal Peronist	2001	2005
Buenos Aires	Domingo Vitale	Federal Peronist	2001	2005
Buenos Aires City	Jorge Martín Arturo Argüello	Justicialist	2003	2007 (Note: Resigned on 4 May 2007 to take office as permanent representative to the United Nations.)
Buenos Aires City	María Elena Barbagelata	Socialist Party	2003 (Note: Since 8 May 2003. Replaced Enrique Mario Martínez.)	2005
Buenos Aires City	Miguel Luis Bonasso	Convergence	2003	2007
Buenos Aires City	Guillermo Marcelo Cantini	Union for Argentina	2001	2005
Buenos Aires City	Gerardo Amadeo Conte Grand	Justicialist	2001	2005
Buenos Aires City	Marta Susana De Brasi	Alternative Social Project	2003	2007
Buenos Aires City	Nilda Celia Garré	Frepaso	2001	2005 (Note: Resigned on 25 June 2005 to take office as Ambassador to Venezuela. Replaced by Agustín Zbar.)
Buenos Aires City	Silvana Myriam Giudici	Encounter	2003	2007
Buenos Aires City	María América González	ARI	2001	2005
Buenos Aires City	Claudio Raúl Lozano	Emancipation and Justice	2003	2007
Buenos Aires City	Juliana Isabel Marino	Encounter	2003	2007
Buenos Aires City	Hugo Martini	Recreate for Growth	2003	2007
Buenos Aires City	Lucrecia Etelvina Monti	Federal Peronist	2003	2007
Buenos Aires City	Laura Cristina Musa	ARI	2001	2005
Buenos Aires City	Aldo Carlos Neri	Radical Civic Union	2001	2005
Buenos Aires City	Inés Pérez Suárez	Eva Perón	2002 (Note: Since 18 September 2002. Replaced Daniel Scioli.)	2005
Buenos Aires City	Federico Pinedo	Commitment to Change	2003	2007
Buenos Aires City	Héctor Teodoro Polino	Socialist Party	2001	2005
Buenos Aires City	Cristian Adrián Ritondo	Justicialist	2003	2007
Buenos Aires City	José Alberto Roselli	Convergence	2001	2005
Buenos Aires City	Irma Roy	Justicialist	2001	2005
Buenos Aires City	Carlos Alberto Tinnirello	Social Encounter Network	2003	2007
Buenos Aires City	Jorge Reinaldo Vanossi	Commitment to Change	2003	2007
Buenos Aires City	Patricia Walsh	United Left	2001	2005
Buenos Aires City	Luis Fernando Zamora	Self-determination and Freedom	2001	2005
Buenos Aires City	Agustín Zbar	Radical Civic Union	2005 (Note: Since 7 July 2005. Replaced Nilda Garré.)	2005
Catamarca	Octavio Néstor Cerezo	Justicialist	2001	2005
Catamarca	Guillermo de la Barrera	Justicialist	2003	2007
Catamarca	Lucía Garín de Tula	Civic and Social Front of Catamarca	2003	2007
Catamarca	Aida Maldonado	Civic and Social Front of Catamarca	2001	2005
Catamarca	Horacio Francisco Pernasetti	Radical Civic Union	2001	2005
Chaco	Liliana Amelia Bayonzo	Radical Civic Union	2001	2005
Chaco	Rafael Alfredo González	Justicialist	2001	2005
Chaco	Beatriz Norma Goy	Justicialist	2001	2005
Chaco	José Ricardo Mongelo	Justicialist	2003	2007
Chaco	Olinda Montenegro	Radical Civic Union	2003	2007
Chaco	Héctor Ramón Romero	Radical Civic Union	2001	2005
Chaco	Víctor Zimmermann	Radical Civic Union	2003	2007
Chubut	Fortunato Rafael Cambareri	Radical Civic Union	2003	2007
Chubut	Víctor Hugo Cisterna	Justicialist	2001	2005
Chubut	Eduardo de Bernardi	Justicialist	2003	2007
Chubut	Gustavo Daniel Di Benedetto	Radical Civic Union	2001	2005
Chubut	Roddy Ernesto Ingram	Justicialist	2003	2007
Córdoba	Gumersindo Federico Alonso	New Party	2003	2007
Córdoba	Mauricio Bossa	UCEDE	2003 (Note: Since 16 July 2003. Replaced Juan Schiaretti.)	2005
Córdoba	Carlos Alberto Caserio	Justicialist	2003	2007
Córdoba	Stella Maris Cittadini de Montes	Justicialist	2003	2007
Córdoba	Adán Noé Fernández Limia	Justicialist	2003	2004 (Note: Died on 19 December 2004. Replaced by Ana María Carmen Monayar.)
Córdoba	Ana María Carmen Monayar	Justicialist	2004 (Note: Since 16 March 2005. Replaced Adán Noé Fernández Limia.)	2007
Córdoba	Eduardo Daniel García	Socialist Party	2001	2005
Córdoba	Oscar Félix González	Justicialist	2001	2005
Córdoba	Guillermo Ernesto Johnson	Justicialist	2001	2005
Córdoba	María Silvina Leonelli	Radical Civic Union	2001	2005
Córdoba	Beatriz Mercedes Leyba de Martí	Radical Civic Union	2003	2007
Córdoba	Raúl Guillermo Merino	New Party	2003	2007
Córdoba	Luis Molinari Romero	Radical Civic Union	2001	2005
Córdoba	Fernando Montoya	Radical Civic Union	2001	2005
Córdoba	Jorge Luciano Montoya	Justicialist	2003	2006 (Note: Resigned on 29 March 2006. Replaced by Amelia de los Milagros López.)
Córdoba	Alicia Isabel Narducci	Justicialist	2001	2005
Córdoba	Mario Raúl Negri	Radical Civic Union	2003	2007
Córdoba	Ana Elisa Rita Richter	Justicialist	2003	2007
Córdoba	Humberto Jesús Roggero	Justicialist	2001	2005
Corrientes	Noel Eugenio Breard	Radical Civic Union	2001	2005
Corrientes	Gustavo Jesús Adolfo Canteros	Corrientes Project	2003	2007 (Note: Resigned on 28 November 2007. Replaced by Pedro Ademar Vera.)
Corrientes	Cecilia Lugo de González Cabañas	Justicialist	2001	2005
Corrientes	Carlos Guillermo Macchi	PANU	2003	2007
Corrientes	Araceli Estela Méndez de Ferreyra	Convergence	2003	2007
Corrientes	Hugo Rubén Perié	Justicialist	2003	2007
Corrientes	Tomás Rubén Pruyas	Justicialist	2001	2005
Entre Ríos	Delma Noemí Bertolyotti	Justicialist	2003 (Note: Since 17 December 2003. Replaced Julio Rodolfo Solanas.)	2005
Entre Ríos	Carlos Jaime Cecco	Radical Civic Union	2003	2007
Entre Ríos	Hugo Ramón Cettour	Justicialist	2001	2005
Entre Ríos	Gustavo Cusinato	Radical Civic Union	2001	2005
Entre Ríos	Jorge Carlos Daud	Justicialist	2003	2007
Entre Ríos	Juan Carlos Lucio Godoy	New Entre Ríos Space	2003	2007
Entre Ríos	Gracia María Jaroslavsky	Radical Civic Union	2001	2005
Entre Ríos	Blanca Inés Osuna	Justicialist	2005	2007 (Note: Resigned on 10 December 2007 to take office as National Senator. Replaced by María de los Ángeles Petit.)
Entre Ríos	Rosario Margarita Romero	Justicialist	2003	2007
Formosa	Mario Fernando Bejarano	Justicialist	2003	2007
Formosa	Adriana Raquel Bortolozzi de Bogado	Justicialist	2001	2005
Formosa	María Graciela de la Rosa	Justicialist	2003	2007
Formosa	Rodolfo Roquel	Justicialist	2003	2007
Formosa	Pedro Antonio Venica	Ricardo Balbín	2001	2005
Jujuy	Héctor Rubén Daza	Justicialist	2003	2007
Jujuy	Liliana Beatriz Fellner	Justicialist	2003	2005 (Note: Resigned on 9 December 2005 to take office as National Senator. Replaced by Eduardo Víctor Cavadini.)
Jujuy	María Teresa Ferrín	Radical Civic Union	2001	2005
Jujuy	Miguel Ángel Giubergia	Radical Civic Union	2003	2007
Jujuy	Alejandro Mario Nieva	Radical Civic Union	2001	2005
Jujuy	Carlos Daniel Snopek	Justicialist	2001	2005
La Pampa	Manuel Justo Baladrón	Justicialist	2001	2005
La Pampa	Santiago Ferrigno	Frepaso	2003	2007
La Pampa	Heriberto Eloy Mediza	Justicialist	2003	2007
La Pampa	Marta Lucía Osorio	Justicialist	2003	2007
La Pampa	Claudio Héctor Pérez Martínez	Radical Civic Union	2001	2005
La Rioja	Gladys Antonia Cáceres	Justicialist	2003 (Note: Since 17 December 2003. Replaced Ricardo Quintela.)	2005
La Rioja	Griselda Noemí Herrera	Justicialist	2003	2007
La Rioja	Julio César Martínez	Radical Civic Union	2003	2007
La Rioja	Adrián Menem	People's Peronism	2003	2007
La Rioja	Alejandra Beatriz Oviedo	People's Peronism	2003	2007
La Rioja	Ricardo Clemente Quintela	Justicialist	2001	2003 (Note: Resigned on 17 December 2003 to take office as Mayor of La Rioja. Replaced by Gladys Antonia Cáceres.)
Mendoza	Josefina Abdala	Radical Civic Union	2003	2007
Mendoza	Guillermo Amstutz	Justicialist	2001	2005
Mendoza	Luis Gustavo Borsani	Radical Civic Union	2003	2007
Mendoza	Daniel Esain	Fiscal	2001	2005
Mendoza	Patricia Susana Fadel	Justicialist	2003	2007
Mendoza	Víctor Manuel Federico Fayad	Radical Civic Union	2001	2005
Mendoza	Alfredo César Fernández	Justicialist	2003	2007
Mendoza	Roberto Raúl Iglesias	Radical Civic Union	2003	2007
Mendoza	Gabriel Joaquín Llano	Democratic Party of Mendoza	2001	2005
Mendoza	Norma Raquel Pilati	Justicialist	2001	2005
Misiones	Irene Miriam Bosch de Sartori	Convergence	2003	2007
Misiones	Hernán Norberto Damiani	Radical Civic Union	2001	2005
Misiones	Julio César Humada	Justicialist	2001	2005
Misiones	Juan Manuel Irrazábal	Justicialist	2003	2007
Misiones	Celia Isla de Saraceni	Justicialist	2001	2005
Misiones	Stella Marys Peso	Justicialist	2003	2007
Misiones	Diego Horacio Sartori	Justicialist	2003	2007
Neuquén	Alicia Marcela Comelli	Neuquén People's Movement	2003	2007
Neuquén	Luis Julián Jalil	Neuquén People's Movement	2001	2005
Neuquén	Susana Beatriz Llambi	Justicialist	2003 (Note: Since 17 December 2003. Replaced Gabriel Luis Romero.)	2005
Neuquén	Encarnación Lozano	Neuquén People's Movement	2001	2005
Neuquén	Alberto César Pérez	Neuquén People's Movement	2003	2007
Neuquén	Gabriel Luis Romero	Justicialist	2001	2003 (Note: Resigned on 17 December 2003. Replaced by Susana Beatriz Llambi.)
Río Negro	Julio Accavallo	Encounter	2001	2005
Río Negro	Fernando Gustavo Chironi	Radical Civic Union	2003	2007
Río Negro	Cynthia Gabriela Hernández	Radical Civic Union	2003	2007
Río Negro	Carlos Alberto Larreguy	Justicialist	2001	2005
Río Negro	Osvaldo Mario Nemirovsci	Justicialist	2003	2007
Salta	María Lelia Chaya	Federal Peronist	2001	2005
Salta	Zulema Beatriz Daher	Justicialist	2003	2007
Salta	Antonio Lovaglio Saravia	Justicialist	2003	2007
Salta	Carlos Alberto Sosa	Salta Renewal Party	2003	2007
Salta	Enrique Tanoni	Justicialist	2001	2005
Salta	Juan Manuel Urtubey	Justicialist	2003	2007
Salta	Andrés Zottos	Salta Renewal Party	2001	2005
San Juan	Guillermo Francisco Baigorri	Life and Commitment	2003	2007
San Juan	Roberto Gustavo Basualdo	Justicialist	2001	2005
San Juan	Dante Elizondo	Justicialist	2001	2005
San Juan	Juan Carlos Gioja	Justicialist	2003	2007
San Juan	Ruperto Eduardo Godoy	Justicialist	2003	2007
San Juan	Juan Jesús Mínguez	Radical Civic Union	2001	2005
San Luis	María Alicia Lemme	People's Movement Front	2003	2007 (Note: Resigned on 15 August 2007. Replaced by Ivana María Bianchi.)
San Luis	José Guillermo L'Huillier	People's Movement Front	2001	2005
San Luis	José Arnaldo Mirabile	People's Movement Front	2001	2005
San Luis	Claudio Javier Poggi	People's Movement Front	2003 (Note: Since 17 December 2003. Replaced María Angélica Torrontegui.)	2005
San Luis	Adolfo Rodríguez Saá	People's Movement Front	2003	2005 (Note: Resigned on 9 December 2005 to take office as National Senator. Replaced by Héctor Omar Torino.)
Santa Cruz	Eduardo Ariel Arnold	Justicialist	2003	2007
Santa Cruz	Silvia Graciela Esteban	Justicialist	2003	2006 (Note: Resigned on 29 March 2006. Replaced by Dante Omar Canevarolo.)
Santa Cruz	Mónica Kuney	Justicialist	2001	2005
Santa Cruz	Alfredo Anselmo Martínez	Radical Civic Union	2001	2005
Santa Cruz	Daniel Varizat	Justicialist	2003 (Note: Since 4 June 2003. Replaced Sergio Acevedo.)	2005
Santa Fe	María del Carmen Alarcón	Justicialist	2003	2007
Santa Fe	Ángel Enzo Baltuzzi	Justicialist	2001	2005
Santa Fe	Alberto Juan Beccani	Radical Civic Union	2003	2007
Santa Fe	Nelson de Lajonquiere	Radical Civic Union	2001	2005
Santa Fe	Eduardo Alfredo Di Pollina	Socialist Party	2003	2007
Santa Fe	Paulina Esther Fiol	Justicialist	2003	2007
Santa Fe	Irma Amelia Foresi	Justicialist	2001	2005
Santa Fe	Susana Rosa García	ARI	2003	2007
Santa Fe	Jorge Raúl Giorgetti	Justicialist	2003	2007
Santa Fe	Jorge Pedro González	Justicialist	2003	2007
Santa Fe	Julio César Gutiérrez	Justicialist	2001	2005
Santa Fe	Oscar Santiago Lamberto	Justicialist	2003	2007
Santa Fe	Gustavo Ángel Marconato	Justicialist	2003	2007
Santa Fe	Alberto Adolfo Natale	Democratic Progressive Party	2001	2005
Santa Fe	Alberto José Piccinini	ARI	2001	2005
Santa Fe	Lilia Puig de Stubrin	Radical Civic Union	2001	2005
Santa Fe	Francisco Nicolás Sellares	Justicialist	2001	2005
Santa Fe	Hugo Guillermo Storero	Radical Civic Union	2001	2005
Santa Fe	Alicia Ester Tate	Radical Civic Union	2003	2007
Santiago del Estero	Roberto José Ábalos	Radical Civic Union	2001	2005
Santiago del Estero	José María Cantos	Justicialist	2003	2007
Santiago del Estero	José Oscar Figueroa	Justicialist	2003	2007
Santiago del Estero	Graciela Hortencia Olmos	Justicialist	2003	2007
Santiago del Estero	Nélida Palomo	Justicialist	2001	2005
Santiago del Estero	Juan Domingo Pinto Bruchmann	Federal Peronist	2001	2005
Santiago del Estero	Fernando Omar Salim	Justicialist	2003	2006 (Note: Resigned on 2 November 2006. Replaced by Carlos Alfredo Anauate.)
Tierra del Fuego	Guillermo Francisco Baigorria	Justicialist	2001	2005
Tierra del Fuego	Rosana Andrea Bertone	Justicialist	2001	2005
Tierra del Fuego	Daniel Oscar Gallo	Justicialist	2003	2007
Tierra del Fuego	María Fabiana Ríos	ARI	2003	2007
Tierra del Fuego	Ricardo Alberto Wilder	Provincial Unity Front	2003	2007
Tucumán	Roque Tobías Álvarez	Justicialist	2001	2005
Tucumán	Stella Maris Córdoba	Justicialist	2001	2005
Tucumán	Susana Eladia Díaz	Justicialist	2003	2007
Tucumán	José Ricardo Falu	Justicialist	2001	2005
Tucumán	Esteban Eduardo Jerez	Tucumán Civic Front	2003	2007
Tucumán	Eusebia Antonia Jerez	Republican Force	2003	2007
Tucumán	Roberto Ignacio Lix Klett	Republican Force	2003	2007
Tucumán	Francisco Alberto Torres	Republican Force	2003 (Note: Since 17 December 2003. Replaced Ricardo Bussi.)	2005
Tucumán	Gerónimo Vargas Aignasse	Justicialist	2003	2007
