= 2007 Buenos Aires City elections =

- Mayoral election
| ← 2003 | 3 June 2007 (first round); 24 June 2007 (second round) | 2011 → |
- Turnout: 70.01% (first round); 68.38% (second round)
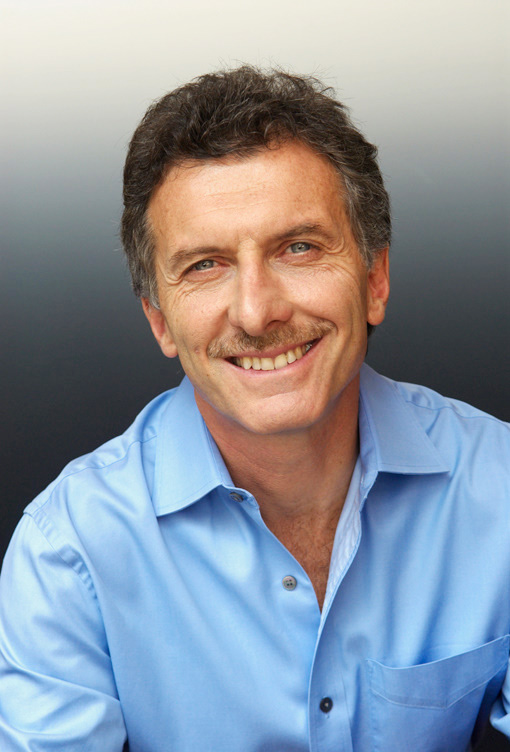

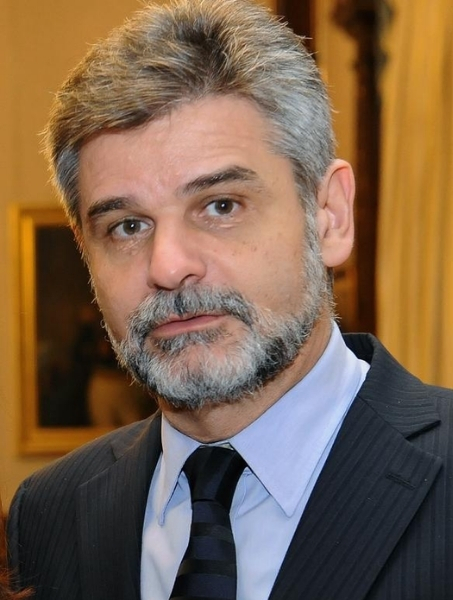
| Nominee | Mauricio Macri | Daniel Filmus |
| Party | CpC | PJ |
| Alliance | PRO | Front for Victory |
| Running mate | Gabriela Michetti | Carlos Heller |
| Popular vote | 1,007,729 | 645,779 |
| Percentage | 60.94% | 39.06% |
- Second round results by electoral circunscription
Chief of Government before election
Jorge Telerman
PJ
Elected Chief of Government
Mauricio Macri
CpC–PRO
- City Legislature
| ← 2005 | 3 June 2007 | 2009 → |
- 30 out of 60 seats in the City Legislature
- Turnout: 73.15%
| Party | Leader | Vote % | Seats | +/– |
|---|---|---|---|---|
| PRO | Mauricio Macri | 44.32 | 15 | +2 |
| DpBA | Aníbal Ibarra | 14.44 | 4 | New |
| FPV-PJ | Daniel Filmus | 10.76 | 3 | −4 |
| MBA | Jorge Telerman | 9.95 | 3 | New |
| CC | Elisa Carrió | 8.59 | 2 | |
| MST | Patricia Walsh | 4.04 | 1 | +1 |
| BAPT | Claudio Lozano | 2.97 | 1 | +1 |
This lists parties that won seats. See the complete results below.

General elections were held in the City of Buenos Aires on 3 June 2007 to elect the Chief of Government (mayor) and half of the City Legislature to four-year terms. As no mayoral candidate won a majority in the first round, a runoff was held on 31 July 2011, in which Mauricio Macri, of the Commitment to Change (CpC) party, defeated Daniel Filmus of the Front for Victory (FPV) coalition to be elected as Chief of Government of Buenos Aires.

Incumbent Jorge Telerman, who had assumed office just over a year prior to the election following the impeachment of Aníbal Ibarra over repercussions from the 2004 Cromañón nightclub fire, sought re-election but was defeated in the first round.

== Background ==
The 2003 elections in Buenos Aires resulted in the re-election of progressive former prosecutor and mayor Aníbal Ibarra, of the Broad Front, in the run-off against centre-right businessman and former Boca Juniors president Mauricio Macri, of Commitment to Change (CpC).

Just a year later, however, the Cromañón nightclub fire led to Ibarra's suspension from office in 2005 and eventual impeachment in 2006, amid accusations of corruption and negligence. Ibarra was replaced by his deputy, Jorge Telerman.

As the existing political alliances had crumbled in the aftermath of Cromañón, Telerman sought re-election on the Civic Coalition ticket, with former mayor Enrique Olivera as running mate, while Macri and his CpC party, now part of the Republican Proposal alliance, geared up for a second attempt at the mayorship. The peronist Front for Victory nominated sociologist and national education minister Daniel Filmus, deputised by labour leader Carlos Heller.

== Candidates ==
| Coalition | Mayoral candidate (party) Prior political experience | Vice mayoral candidate (party) Prior political experience | Parties |
|---|---|---|---|
| | Mauricio Macri (CPC); National Deputy (2005–2007) | Gabriela Michetti (CPC); City Legislator (2003–2007) | CPC; RPC; MID; PDP; PD; PF; UP; PB; FJI |
| | Daniel Filmus (PJ); Minister of Education (2003–2007) | Carlos Heller (PSOL); President of Banco Credicoop (since 2005) | PJ; PV; PSOL; FPyP; PGI; PDC; RxBA; JEA |
| | Jorge Telerman (PJ); Chief of Government (2006–2007) | Enrique Olivera (ARI); Chief of Government (1999–2000) | ARI; UCR; PS; PDC; LDS; EP; UPT; CP; DB; IV; RRP |
| | Patricia Walsh (MST); National Deputy (2001–2005) | Héctor Bidonde (MST); City Legislator (2003–2007) | MST |
| | Claudio Lozano (BAPT); National Deputy (2003–2015) | María América González (BAPT); National Deputy (1997–2003) | BAPT |

== Results ==
=== Chief of Government ===
| Candidate | Running mate | Party | First round | | Second round | |
| Candidate | Running mate | Party | Votes | % | Votes | % |
|---|---|---|---|---|---|---|
| Mauricio Macri | Gabriela Michetti | Republican Proposal Alliance Alliance | 798,292 | 45.76 | 1,007,729 | 60.94 |
| Daniel Filmus | Carlos Heller | Front for Victory–Dialogue for Buenos Aires | 414,205 | 23.75 | 645,779 | 39.06 |
| Jorge Telerman | Enrique Olivera | More for Buenos Aires–Civic Coalition | 360,734 | 20.68 | | |
| Patricia Walsh | Héctor Bidonde | Workers' Socialist Movement | 51,465 | 2.95 | | |
| Claudio Lozano | María América González | Buenos Aires for All | 47,505 | 2.72 | | |
| Lía Méndez | Néstor Jorge Avella | Humanist Party | 16,346 | 0.94 | | |
| Marcelo Ramal | Vanina Biasi | Workers' Party | 15,623 | 0.90 | | |
| Guillermo Cherashny | Miguel Ángel Ramón Gómez | Porteño Consensus Party | 6,471 | 0.37 | | |
| Christian Castillo | Carlos Artacho | Socialist Workers' Party | 6,151 | 0.35 | | |
| Jorge Selser | Adrián Camps | Authentic Socialist Party | 5,925 | 0.34 | | |
| José Castillo | Jorge Guidobono Rey | Revolutionary Socialist Left Front | 5,769 | 0.33 | | |
| Héctor Heberling | Andrea Fabiana Salmini | Socialist Advance Movement | 3,317 | 0.19 | | |
| Rubén Oscar Saboulard | Héctor Guillermo Bullrich | Independent Justice and Dignity Movement | 2,949 | 0.17 | | |
| Enrique Venturino | Carlos Hoyos | Movement for Dignity and Independence | 2,383 | 0.14 | | |
| Juan Carlos Beica | Esilda Raquel Bustos | Socialist Convergence | 2,200 | 0.13 | | |
| Javier Ernesto Brodsky | Arturo José Pécora | Popular Concertation | 2,028 | 0.12 | | |
| Juan Ricardo Mussa | María Daniel Llanos | Citizen Action | 1,810 | 0.10 | | |
| Graciela Patané | Hilda Orlinda Oates | The Movement | 1,183 | 0.07 | | |
| Total | | | 1,744,356 | 100.00 | 1,653,508 | 100.00 |
| Valid votes | | | 1,744,356 | 96.81 | 1,653,508 | 94.01 |
| Invalid votes | | | 27,132 | 1.51 | 52,045 | 2.96 |
| Blank votes | | | 30,347 | 1.68 | 53,334 | 3.03 |
| Total votes | | | 1,801,835 | 100.00 | 1,758,887 | 100.00 |
| Registered voters/turnout | | | 2,573,731 | 70.01 | 2,573,731 | 68.34 |

=== Legislature ===
| Party | Votes | % | Seats |
|---|---|---|---|
| Republican Proposal Alliance | 768,748 | 44.32 | 15 |
| Dialogue for Buenos Aires | 250,471 | 14.44 | 5 |
| Front for Victory | 186,559 | 10.76 | 3 |
| More Buenos Aires | 172,642 | 9.95 | 3 |
| Civic Coalition | 148,899 | 8.59 | 2 |
| Socialist Workers' Movement | 70,065 | 4.04 | 1 |
| Buenos Aires for All | 51,506 | 2.97 | 1 |
| Workers' Party | 18,927 | 1.09 | 0 |
| Humanist Party | 17,981 | 1.04 | 0 |
| Authentic Socialist Party | 7,253 | 0.42 | 0 |
| Socialist Workers' Party | 6,585 | 0.38 | 0 |
| Revolutionary Socialist Left Front | 6,484 | 0.37 | 0 |
| Porteño Consensus Party | 6,241 | 0.36 | 0 |
| Movement for Socialism | 3,532 | 0.20 | 0 |
| Independent Justice and Dignity Movement | 3,191 | 0.18 | 0 |
| Movement for Dignity and Independence | 2,818 | 0.16 | 0 |
| Porteño Commitment | 2,789 | 0.16 | 0 |
| Socialist Convergence | 2,650 | 0.15 | 0 |
| Concertación Popular | 2,410 | 0.14 | 0 |
| Citizen Action | 1,965 | 0.11 | 0 |
| Call to Social Integration | 1,431 | 0.08 | 0 |
| The Movement | 1,247 | 0.07 | 0 |
| Total | 1,734,394 | 100.00 | 30 |
| Valid votes | 1,734,394 | 96.26 | |
| Invalid votes | 27,303 | 1.52 | |
| Blank votes | 40,138 | 2.23 | |
| Total votes | 1,801,835 | 100.00 | |
| Registered voters/turnout | 2,573,731 | 70.01 | |

== See also ==
- Cromañón nightclub fire
- 2007 Argentine general election
- List of mayors and chiefs of government of Buenos Aires
