= Cecilia Felgueras =

Argentine politician

Deputy Chief of Government of Buenos Aires
- In office 7 August 2000 – 10 December 2003
- Preceded by: Enrique Olivera
- Succeeded by: Jorge Telerman

President of PAMI
- In office 15 December 1999 – 7 August 2000
- President: Fernando de la Rúa
- Preceded by: Víctor Alderete
- Succeeded by: Horacio Rodríguez Larreta

Personal details
- Born: 6 January 1962 (age 63); Buenos Aires, Argentina
- Political party: Radical Civic Union; Alliance for Work, Justice and Education
- Occupation: Politician

Cecilia Felgueras (born 6 January 1962) is an Argentine politician. She was the comptroller of PAMI during the Presidency of Fernando de la Rúa but would lose the position because of prosecution over alleged corruption. She was then briefly the Deputy Chief of Government of Buenos Aires in Aníbal Ibarra's first term but was removed from this position as well. She was the first woman to hold that position. She has a degree in history.

== Career ==
On 15 December 1999, she was named President of PAMI by President Fernando de la Rúa. The next year, she and other former PAMI heads Horacio Rodríguez Larreta and Daniel Tonietto before a court because of a complaint from the Argentine Federation of Chambers of Pharmacy (FACAF) accusing the three politicians of favoritism towards Farmacéuticos Argentinos SA (FASA) for the acquisition of influenza vaccines. Also among the complaints was an accusation that PAMI paid the FASA an unregistered sum of 150,000 pesos.

In 2000, Felgueras became the first woman to head the government of the City of Buenos Aires with her election on 17 August. The next month, she met and greeted Abdullah of Saudi Arabia, the King of Saudi Arabia, and gave him the keys to the city. Felgueras's friendship with Ibarra collapsed on 24 January 2001. He criticized the city's lax response to a storm that had recently struck the city, in whose aftermath only a few members of the city's leadership arrived for their jobs.

Political offices
Preceded by Enrique Olivera	Deputy Chief of Government of Buenos Aires; 2000–2003	Succeeded by Jorge Telerman
