= 1997 Argentine legislative election =

- 26 October 1997
- 127 of the 257 seats in the Chamber of Deputies
- Turnout: 79.63%
Party	Vote %	Seats	+/–
Alliance for Work, Justice and Education	46.94	63	+18
Justicialist Party	36.37	50	−16
Action for the Republic	3.84	3	New
Republican Force	1.43	2	+1
Democratic Party	1.32	2	+1
New Party	1.30	2	New
Democratic Progressive Party	0.92	1	0
Development and Justice Party	0.45	1	New
Autonomist–Liberal–PDP–UCEDE	0.45	1	−2
Neuquén People's Movement	0.25	1	0
Fuegian People's Movement	0.06	1	0
This lists parties that won seats. See the complete results below.
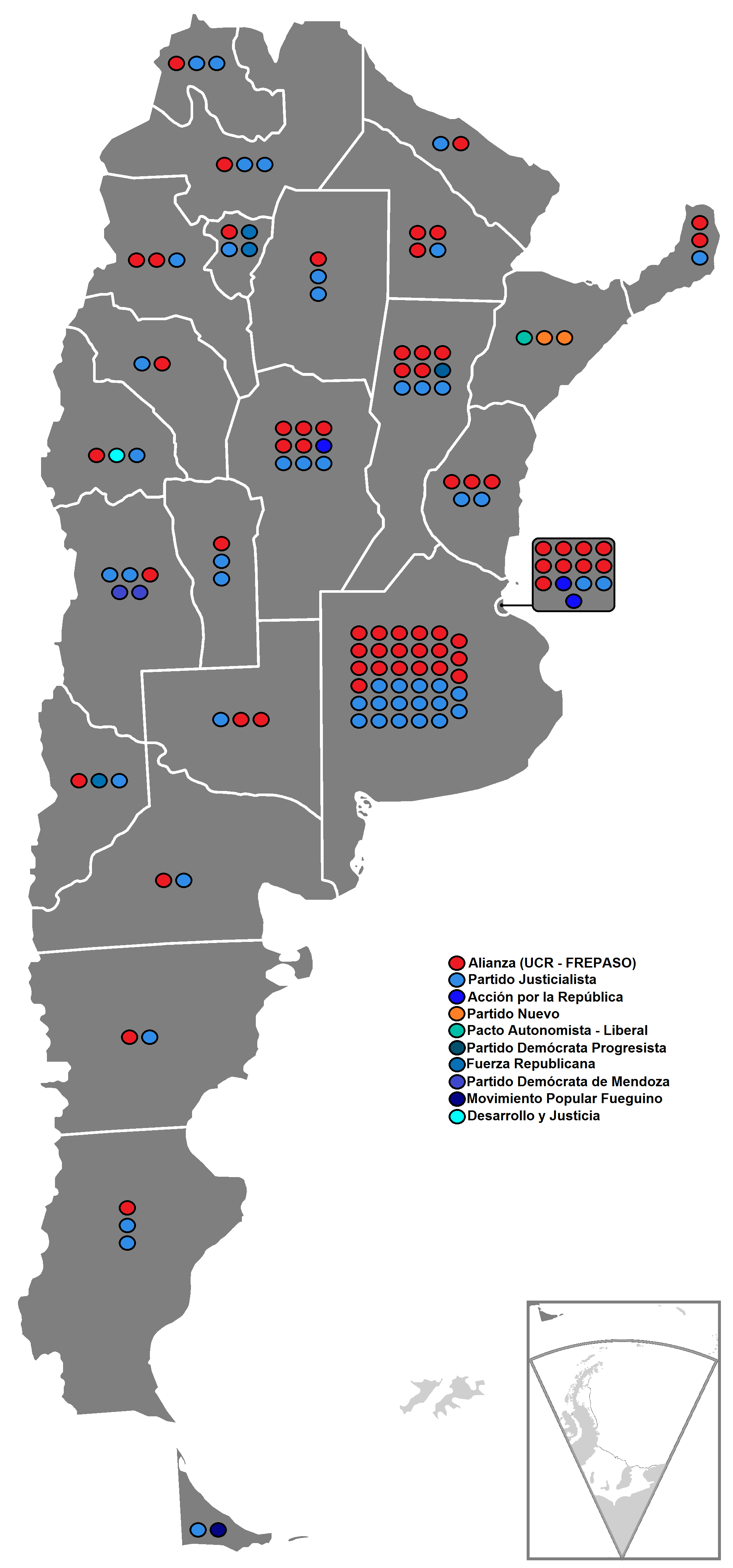
Results by province

Legislative elections were held in Argentina on 26 October 1997. The elections were only the second time the peronist Justicialist Party had been defeated since 1985, although the party still maintained control of the Congress.

== Background ==
President Carlos Menem, who successfully campaigned to have the Argentine Constitution amended in 1994 largely for the sake of being eligible for a second term in office, won the 1995 election in a landslide. The clouds of recession gathered immediately, however, as Argentine business confidence struggled following the shock of the Mexican peso crisis. Unemployment in Argentina, already higher as a result of a wave of imports and sharp gains in productivity after 1990, leapt from 12% to 18% in the first half of 1995 and, as Argentines geared for the 1997 parliamentary mid-term elections two years later, the figure remained around 15% and wages, frozen at their 1994 level.

The party was also divided on how to respond to President Menem. The CGT labor union, traditionally an important souce of support for the Justicialists, joined smaller unions, left-wing activists and the FrePaSo, who finished second in the 1995 elections, in a series of general strikes beginning in August 1996.

Economic problems also led to a sudden increase in crime, particularly property crime, even during the vigorous recovery during 1996–97. Menem's erstwhile "ace of spades," Economy Minister Domingo Cavallo, whose Convertibility Plan was lauded as the reason behind the "Argentine miracle" between 1991 and 1994 (in which the economy, following 16 years of zero growth, expanded by a third), became unpopular during the recession and strained relations with the President after publicly denouncing the influence of "mafias" within the administration. Cavallo was acrimoniously dismissed by the President in July 1996; but the January 1997 murder of Noticias newsmagazine photojournalist José Luis Cabezas and the subsequent implication of transport magnate Alfredo Yabrán in the crime lent credence to Cavallo's accusations and cost the ruling Justicialist Party further approval.

Following the UCR's poor performance in the 1995 elections, former president and UCR leader Raúl Alfonsín negotiated an alliance with the center-left FrePaSo. Although the UCR and FrePaSo ran on separate slates in several provinces, including Córdoba, the Alliance won a majority of congressional seats in 13 of the 23 provinces and in the city of Buenos Aires. The results represented a setback for supporters of President Carlos Menem within the Justicialist Party and in wider Argentine politics.

== Results ==
Party	Votes	%	Seats	
Party	Votes	%	Won	Total
Alliance for Work, Justice and Education	8,097,301	46.94	63	114
Justicialist Party	6,274,385	36.37	50	118
Action for the Republic	662,403	3.84	3	3
Republican Force	247,129	1.43	2	3
Democratic Party	228,291	1.32	2	3
New Party	223,668	1.30	2	2
United Left	183,132	1.06	0	0
Democratic Progressive Party	159,035	0.92	1	2
Movement for Dignity and Independence	158,380	0.92	0	0
Workers' Party	152,345	0.88	0	0
Humanist Party	122,777	0.71	0	0
Open Politics for Social Integrity	121,128	0.70	0	0
Union of the Democratic Centre	94,845	0.55	0	3
Development and Justice Party	77,476	0.45	1	1
Autonomist–Liberal–PDP–UCEDE	77,228	0.45	1	3
United People	73,436	0.43	0	0
Authentic Socialist Party	60,470	0.35	0	0
Resistance Front	42,738	0.25	0	0
Neuquén People's Movement	42,701	0.25	1	2
Social Progress Party	25,863	0.15	0	0
Retirees' Front	19,037	0.11	0	0
Chaco Action	18,951	0.11	0	0
Socialist Workers' Party	16,743	0.10	0	0
Fuegian People's Movement	10,740	0.06	1	2
Chubut Action Party	8,863	0.05	0	0
Institutional Action	7,739	0.04	0	0
Jujuy People's Movement	7,681	0.04	0	1
Social Unity Movement	6,952	0.04	0	0
Liberal Democratic Party	6,013	0.03	0	0
Civic Action Movement	5,521	0.03	0	0
La Rioja Provincial Defense	4,350	0.03	0	0
Popular Line Movement	3,200	0.02	0	0
Provincial Defence–White Flag	2,734	0.02	0	0
Independent Call	2,492	0.01	0	0
Río Gallegos Neighborhood Movement for Santa Cruz	2,251	0.01	0	0
Salta Solidarity Front	1,915	0.01	0	0
Opposition Front	1,571	0.01	0	0
Total	17,251,484	100.00	127	257
Valid votes	17,251,484	93.39		
Invalid votes	262,219	1.42		
Blank votes	958,676	5.19		
Total votes	18,472,379	100.00		
Registered voters/turnout	23,198,858	79.63		
Source: Ministry of the Interior, DINE
