= 2001 Argentine legislative election =

- 14 October 2001
- Chamber of Deputies
- 127 of the 257 seats in the Chamber of Deputies
- Turnout: 75.47%
Party	Vote %	Seats	+/–
Justicialist Party	38.48	66	+16
Alliance for Work, Justice and Education	22.71	35	−28
Support for an Egalitarian Republic	9.10	8	New
Social Pole (PL–PDC)	4.12	4	New
United Left	3.63	1	+1
Federalist Unity Party	2.08	2	New
Union Front for Buenos Aires (PJ+AR)	1.09	2	New
Self-determination and Freedom	0.95	2	New
Democratic Party	0.89	1	−1
Democratic Progressive Party	0.77	1	0
Republican Force	0.72	1	−1
Salta Renewal Party	0.66	1	New
FISCAL	0.52	1	New
Neuquén People's Movement	0.43	2	+1
This lists parties that won seats. See the complete results below.
- Senate
- All 72 seats in the Senate
- Turnout: 75.49%
Party	Vote %	Seats	+/–
Justicialist Party	38.96	42	+3
Alliance for Work, Justice and Education	23.45	26	+2
Republican Force	0.68	1	0
Salta Renewal Party	0.65	1	0
Neuquén People's Movement	0.42	2	0
This lists parties that won seats. See the complete results below.

Legislative elections were held on Sunday, 14 October 2001 to elect 127 of the 257 seats in the Argentine Chamber of Deputies and all 72 seats in the Argentine Senate. The elections were held during the second year of the administration of President Fernando de la Rúa. Elections to the Chamber of Deputies are held using staggered elections, with only 127 of the 257 seats in that chamber being up for grabs.

In the event, the opposition Justicialist Party took control of both chambers of the legislature, severely limiting the power of the administration of De la Rúa. His government was supported by the Radical Civic Union, the Broad Front and the Front for a Country in Solidarity, who contested the election jointly under the banner of the Alliance for Work, Justice and Education.

The Argentine Senate faced its first elections since 1995, and in accordance with an agreement crafted following the 1994 reform of the Argentine Constitution, all 72 seats would be renewed, and three classes of senators elected in 2001 would serve for two, four, or six-years in their first term afterwards. Senators, save for the City of Buenos Aires, had previously been elected by their respective provincial legislatures, but would now be popularly elected.

Nearly a quarter of the votes in the election were blank or spoiled ballots, expressing disillusionment with Argentine politicians.

== Background ==
In 1999 Fernando de la Rúa had been elected President of Argentina in that year's elections. De la Rúa had inherited an economy in recession, and in the midst of an economic crisis. In the end, the 2001 legislative elections were seen as a rebuke for De la Rúa and his handling of the crisis, which was at that point in its fourth year. The Justicialist Party, which had suffered a defeat in 1999, staged a comeback in this election, benefiting from its role as the principal opposition party. Elections in Argentina are compulsory, meaning that those who fail to turn out potentially could face a fine or other punishment. Despite this, roughly a quarter (24.4%) of Argentines eligible to vote, chose to stay at home. The blank votes additionally made up a major share of all votes cast.

== Results ==
=== Chamber of Deputies ===
Party	Votes	%	Seats	
Party	Votes	%	Won	Total
Justicialist Party	5,499,353	38.48	66	117
Alliance for Work, Justice and Education	3,244,891	22.71	35	97
Support for an Egalitarian Republic	1,300,438	9.10	8	8
Social Pole (PL–PDC)	588,424	4.12	4	4
United Left	518,314	3.63	1	1
Humanist Party	384,248	2.69	0	0
Federalist Unity Party	296,804	2.08	2	3
Union of the Democratic Centre	287,976	2.02	0	0
Workers' Party–Movimiento al Socialismo	243,784	1.71	0	0
Action for the Republic	160,832	1.13	0	9
Union Front for Buenos Aires (PJ+AR) (Note: 1 seat for Justicialist Party and 1 seat for Action for the Republic.)	156,104	1.09	2	2
Self-determination and Freedom	135,361	0.95	2	2
Democratic Party	126,769	0.89	1	2
Democratic Progressive Party	109,796	0.77	1	3
Socialist Workers' Party	105,836	0.74	0	0
Neighborhood Action Movement	104,427	0.73	0	0
Republican Force	103,447	0.72	1	2
Salta Renewal Party	95,001	0.66	1	2
Christian Democratic Party	81,092	0.57	0	0
Front of Social Integration for a Change in Freedom	74,002	0.52	1	1
Neuquén People's Movement	60,852	0.43	2	3
People's Reconstruction Party	53,580	0.37	0	0
Retirees in Action	53,026	0.37	0	0
Corrientes Civic and Social Front	44,954	0.31	0	1
Popular Renewal Front	42,548	0.30	0	0
Movement for Dignity and Independence	45,218	0.32	0	0
Constitutional Nationalist Party	34,275	0.24	0	0
Integration and Development Movement	31,134	0.22	0	0
Labor Party	30,767	0.22	0	0
United People's Front	24,016	0.17	0	0
Chubut Action Party	21,891	0.15	0	0
Popular Movement for the Reconquest	20,951	0.15	0	0
Buenos Aires Popular Movement	20,741	0.15	0	0
Popular Action Movement	20,312	0.14	0	0
Native Action	19,506	0.14	0	0
Development and Justice Party	17,193	0.12	0	0
Change Córdoba	15,725	0.11	0	0
For a New Jujuy	14,676	0.10	0	0
Civic Renewal Movement	13,292	0.09	0	0
Río Negro Provincial Party	11,891	0.08	0	0
People's Patagonian Movement	11,589	0.08	0	0
Liberation Front	10,788	0.08	0	0
Independent Democratic Movement	9,659	0.07	0	0
Santa Cruz Federal Movement	6,822	0.05	0	0
Social Democratic Party	6,760	0.05	0	0
Memory and Participation	6,432	0.05	0	0
Middle Generation Party	6,395	0.04	0	0
Fuegian People's Movement	4,660	0.03	0	0
Fuegian Federal Party	4,433	0.03	0	0
United People	3,331	0.02	0	0
Provincial Civic Action	2,891	0.02	0	0
New Leadership	2,811	0.02	0	0
New Front	90	0.00	0	0
Total	14,290,108	100.00	127	257
Valid votes	14,290,108	76.02		
Invalid votes	2,486,296	13.23		
Blank votes	2,022,587	10.76		
Total votes	18,798,991	100.00		
Registered voters/turnout	24,907,838	75.47		

=== Senate ===
Party	Votes	%	Seats			
Party	Votes	%	2001-03	2001-05	2001-07	Total
Justicialist Party	5,668,523	38.96	14	16	12	42
Alliance for Work, Justice and Education	3,412,195	23.45	9	8	9	26
Support for an Egalitarian Republic	1,304,735	8.97	0	0	0	0
Social Pole (PL–PDC)	630,309	4.33	0	0	0	0
United Left	499,932	3.44	0	0	0	0
Humanist Party	376,376	2.59	0	0	0	0
Federalist Unity Party	321,768	2.21	0	0	0	0
Union of the Democratic Centre	306,365	2.11	0	0	0	0
Workers' Party–Movimiento al Socialismo	237,670	1.63	0	0	0	0
Action for the Republic	159,611	1.10	0	0	0	0
Union Front for Buenos Aires (PJ+AR)	150,291	1.03	0	0	0	0
Democratic Party	127,343	0.88	0	0	0	0
Socialist Workers' Party	105,757	0.73	0	0	0	0
Democratic Progressive Party	104,411	0.72	0	0	0	0
Republican Force	99,408	0.68	1	0	0	1
Salta Renewal Party	94,423	0.65	0	0	1	1
Self-determination and Freedom	92,647	0.64	0	0	0	0
Front of Social Integration for a Change in Freedom	87,354	0.60	0	0	0	0
Christian Democratic Party	67,149	0.46	0	0	0	0
Neuquén People's Movement	61,613	0.42	0	0	2	2
People's Reconstruction Party	53,140	0.37	0	0	0	0
Retirees in Action	51,975	0.36	0	0	0	0
Corrientes Civic and Social Front	46,202	0.32	0	0	0	0
Movement for Dignity and Independence	44,781	0.31	0	0	0	0
Popular Renewal Front	43,349	0.30	0	0	0	0
Integration and Development Movement	35,520	0.24	0	0	0	0
Labor Party	30,634	0.21	0	0	0	0
Constitutional Nationalist Party	29,294	0.20	0	0	0	0
Chubut Action Party	22,379	0.15	0	0	0	0
Popular Action Movement	21,146	0.15	0	0	0	0
Popular Movement for the Reconquest	21,030	0.14	0	0	0	0
Buenos Aires Popular Movement	20,793	0.14	0	0	0	0
Native Action	20,333	0.14	0	0	0	0
United People's Front	19,646	0.14	0	0	0	0
Development and Justice Party	18,183	0.12	0	0	0	0
Social Progress Party	17,348	0.12	0	0	0	0
For a New Jujuy	15,871	0.11	0	0	0	0
Change Córdoba	15,501	0.11	0	0	0	0
Popular Front	12,896	0.09	0	0	0	0
Civic Renewal Movement	12,518	0.09	0	0	0	0
Río Negro Provincial Party	11,771	0.08	0	0	0	0
People's Patagonian Movement	11,547	0.08	0	0	0	0
Liberation Front	10,464	0.07	0	0	0	0
Independent Democratic Movement	10,343	0.07	0	0	0	0
Santa Cruz Federal Movement	8,514	0.06	0	0	0	0
Memory and Participation	6,582	0.05	0	0	0	0
Social Democratic Party	6,462	0.04	0	0	0	0
Fuegian Federal Party	6,330	0.04	0	0	0	0
Middle Generation Party	6,192	0.04	0	0	0	0
United People	3,246	0.02	0	0	0	0
Provincial Civic Action	3,182	0.02	0	0	0	0
New Leadership	2,764	0.02	0	0	0	0
Fuegian People's Movement	2,757	0.02	0	0	0	0
New Front	93	0.00	0	0	0	0
Total	14,550,666	100.00	24	24	24	72
Valid votes	14,550,666	77.38				
Invalid votes	2,519,441	13.40				
Blank votes	1,732,861	9.22				
Total votes	18,802,968	100.00				
Registered voters/turnout	24,907,838	75.49				
