= Aníbal Ibarra =

Argentine lawyer and politician

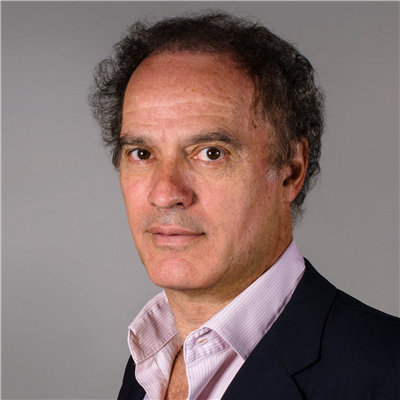

3rd Chief of Government of the City of Buenos Aires
- In office August 7, 2000 – March 7, 2006
- Preceded by: Enrique Olivera
- Succeeded by: Jorge Telerman

Personal details
- Born: March 1, 1958 (age 68) Lomas de Zamora, Buenos Aires Province
- Party: Popular Progressive Front (2013–present) Dialogue for Buenos Aires (2006–2013) Broad Front (1993–2006) Communist Party of Argentina (1973–1976)
- Spouse: Marcela Heiss
- Education: University of Buenos Aires
- Profession: lawyer

Aníbal Ibarra (born March 1, 1958) is an Argentine lawyer and politician who served as mayor of Buenos Aires.

== Biography ==
Ibarra was born in Lomas de Zamora, a district located in the southern region of Greater Buenos Aires. His father was a Paraguayan member of the PLRA who left his country during the dictatorship of Alfredo Stroessner. He enrolled at the Instituto Libre de Segunda Enseñanza, a public college preparatory school, and earned a law degree at the University of Buenos Aires. He worked as a prosecutor in the Judiciary, but resigned this job to participate in politics with as co-founder in 1990 of center-left party: the Frente Grande.

His opposition to the pardons granted by President Carlos Menem to leaders of the 1976–83 dictatorship convicted in the 1985 Trial of the Juntas led to Ibarra's dismissal as prosecutor in 1991 by Solicitor General Oscar Roger. He was elected, however, to the Buenos Aires Deliberative Council that September, and in 1993 was named President of the Council. He was later elected as a member of the convention that oversaw the 1994 amendment of the Argentine Constitution. Ibarra became a leading member of the Front for a Country in Solidarity (FrePaSo), an alliance formed in 1995 by the Frente Grande, the Socialist Party, and other center-left parties, becoming the first president of the Buenos Aires City Legislature upon its replacement of the Deliberative Council in 1997.

Ibarra was elected on May 7, 2000, as Mayor of the Autonomous City of Buenos Aires in the first round, defeating Domingo Cavallo, former Economy Minister of the country. He was re-elected mayor in 2003, winning the run-off election against the center-right businessman Mauricio Macri. He was supported by newly elected President Néstor Kirchner, and became a leading "transversal" figure during the Kirchner presidency (allies of the president without belonging to his party). Some of Ibarra's most significant works as mayor include the expansion and refurbishment of the Pedro de Elizalde Children's Hospital, initiating construction on subway Line H, and the purchase of the derelict but architecturally significant CIAE power station, later converted into the Usina del Arte (Arts Powerhouse).

On December 30, 2004, the República Cromagnon nightclub fire killed 194 people and raised a wave of accusations against political officials of the city. Ibarra was accused of tolerating or ignoring a lack of safety checks, of conducting the rescue operations improperly, and other charges. On November 14, 2005, an impeachment jury formed by a commission of the Buenos Aires Legislature suspended him for four months. He accused the opposition of manipulating the families of República Cromagnon's victims in order to ruin his career, and upon being notified of the suspension, he announced did not resign but await for the investigation to be concluded. The Executive Branch of Buenos Aires was in the meantime presided over by Vice-Mayor Jorge Telerman.

On March 7, 2006, the impeachment jury commission ruled the dismissal of Ibarra as mayor of Buenos Aires. Of the 15 members of the commission, 10 voted for Ibarra's dismissal, 4 against, and one abstained. The accusers had additionally asked for a 10-year ban from public office duties, but the members of the commission only asked for 6 years at most, and finally did not decide on any sort of ban.

In the City elections of June 2007, Ibarra's party list for the City Legislature gained second place and he and four other members of his coalition – the Popular Progressive Front – were elected for the term starting December 10, 2007, in support of President Kirchner's unsuccessful mayoral candidate, Daniel Filmus. Ibarra was reelected to the City Legislature in 2011.

His sister, Vilma Ibarra, is a National Deputy and former Senator.

Political offices
| Preceded by Enrique Olivera | Chief of Government of Buenos Aires City; 2000–2006 | Succeeded by Jorge Telerman |
