= Darío Alessandro =

Argentine politician (1951–2021)

Darío Pedro Alessandro
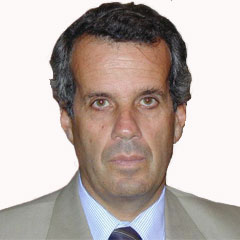
- Born: 25 December 1951
- Died: 19 May 2021 (aged 69)
- Resting place: Buenos Aires, Argentina
- Education: University of Buenos Aires
- Occupations: Diplomat, Legislator, Sociologist
- Political party: Front for a Country in Solidarity
- Spouse: Marta Cichero

Darío Pedro Alessandro (25 December 1951 – 19 May 2021) was an Argentine sociologist, politician, and diplomat.

Alessandro was born into a politically active family, his father was an original member of FORJA (Spanish: Fuerza de Orientación Radical de la Joven Argentina). He studied sociology at the University of Buenos Aires, where he engaged in student leadership.

A former Congressional deputy from the FrePaSo party, Alessandro was appointed ambassador to Cuba in December 2004 and in 2008 he was appointed to serve as the ambassador to Peru. He was close to the Front for Victory faction of President of Argentina Néstor Kirchner. During his time in parliament he was an opponent to the policies of privatization under the government of Carlos Menem.

In 2021, Alessandro died from pancreatic cancer after undergoing an operation.
