= 1995 Argentine general election =

- Presidential election
- 14 May 1995
- Registered: 22,178,201
- Turnout: 82.08%
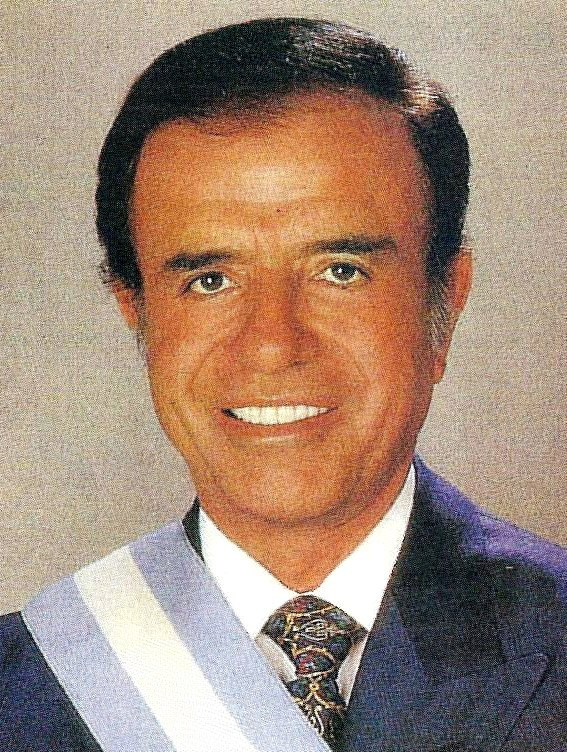

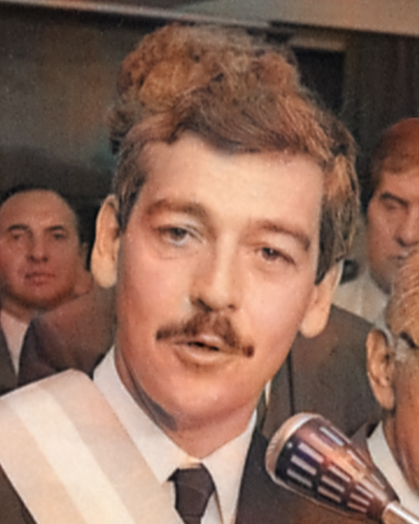

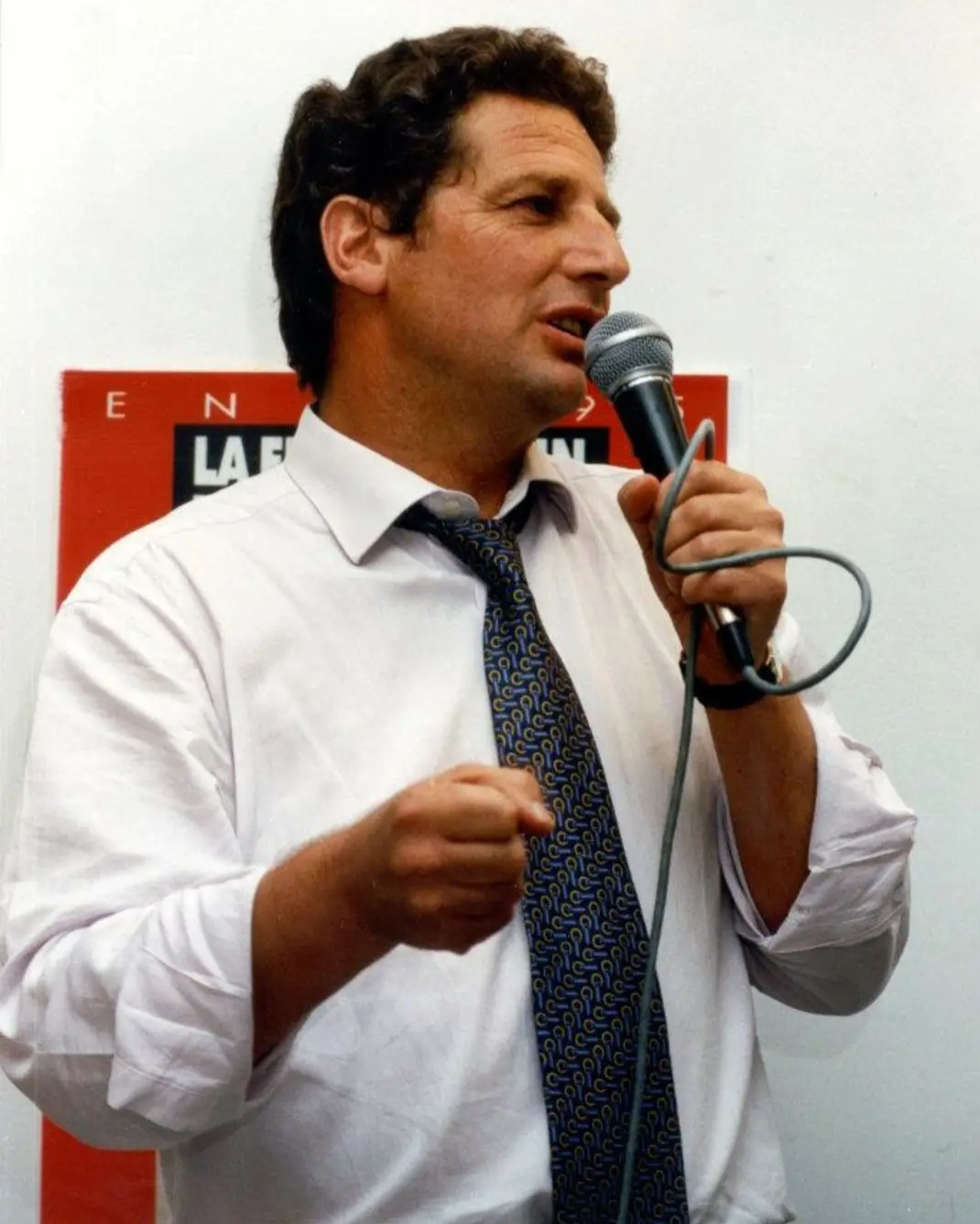
Nominee	Carlos Menem	José Octavio Bordón	Horacio Massaccesi
Party	PJ	PAIS	UCR
Alliance	Justicialist Front	FREPASO	UCR+MID
Running mate	Carlos Ruckauf	Carlos Álvarez	Antonio María Hernández
Popular vote	8,687,511	5,096,104	2,956,137
Percentage	49.94%	29.30%	16.99%
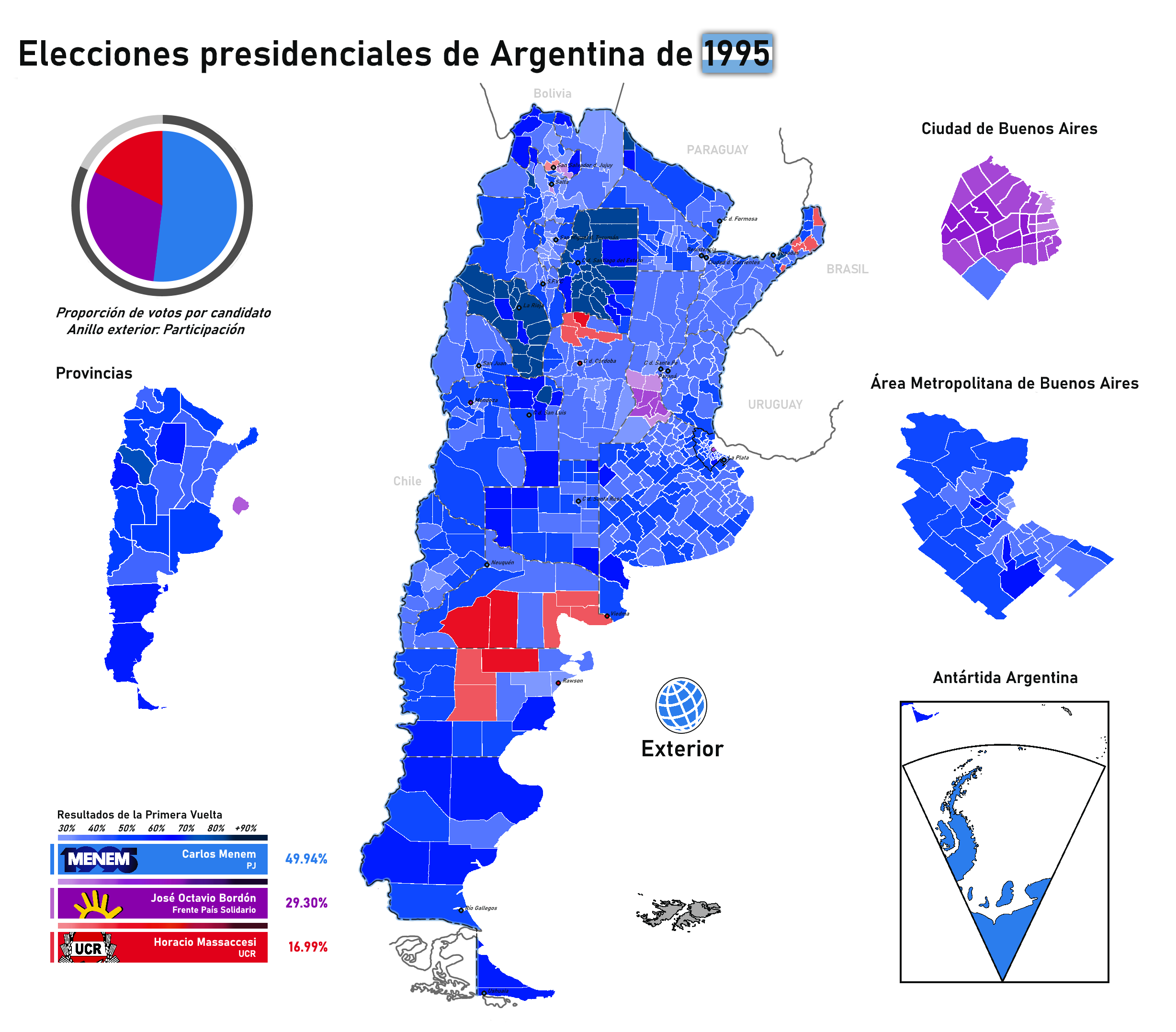
- Results by province and department
President before election
Carlos Menem
PJ
Elected President
Carlos Menem
PJ
- Legislative election
- 14 May 1995
- 130 of the 257 seats in the Chamber of Deputies
- Turnout: 82.08%
Party	Vote %	Seats	+/–
Justicialist Party	49.38	75	+12
Radical Civic Union	21.94	27	−16
Front for a Country in Solidarity	21.23	21	+18
Democratic Progressive Party	0.94	1	0
Autonomist–Liberal–Democratic Progressive	0.93	2	0
Republican Force	0.71	1	−1
Democratic Party	0.68	1	+1
Neuquén People's Movement	0.36	1	0
Fuegian People's Movement	0.05	1	−1
This lists parties that won seats. See the complete results below.

General elections were held in Argentina on 14 May. Voters chose both the President and their legislators and with a turnout of 82%. It was the first election in post-1983 Argentina in which the president was elected directly, as the electoral college was abolished by 1995.

== Background ==
The Justicialist Party had been founded in 1946 by Juan Perón, largely on the promise of greater self-reliance, increased state ownership in the economy and a shift in national policy to benefit "the other half" of Argentine society. Taking office on Perón's ticket in 1989 amid the worst crisis in a hundred years, President Carlos Menem had begun the systematic sell-off of Argentina's array of State enterprises, which had produced nearly half the nation's goods and services. Following 18 months of very mixed results, in February 1991 Menem reached out to his Foreign Minister, Domingo Cavallo, whose experience as an economist included a brief but largely positive stint as the nation's Central Bank president in 1982. His introduction of a fixed exchange rate via his Convertibility Plan led to sharp drops in interest rates and inflation, though the sudden recovery and Cavallo's fixed exchange rate (converted to 1 peso per dollar in 1992) led to a fivefold jump in imports (far outpacing the flush growth in demand). A wave of layoffs after 1992 created a tense labor climate often worsened by the flamboyant Menem, who also diluted basic labor laws, leading to less overtime pay and increasing unemployment and underemployment. Private-sector lay-offs, dismissed as a natural consequence of recovering productivity (which had not risen in 20 years), added to mounting state enterprise and government layoffs, leading to a rise in unemployment from 7% in 1992 to 12% by 1994 (after GDP had leapt by a third in just four years). In this policy irony lay the Justicialists' greatest weakness ahead of the 1995 election.

The election itself created yet another unexpected turn. Barred from immediate reelection by the 1853 Argentine Constitution, President Menem reached out to his predecessor and head of the embattled centrist Radical Civic Union (UCR), Raúl Alfonsín. Meeting at the presidential residence in Olivos in November 1993 to negotiate an extensive amendment of the Constitution, the two leaders came to an agreement of mutual benefit: Alfonsín obtained the direct election of the mayor of (UCR-leaning) Buenos Aires (depriving the presidency of a right held since 1880 to appoint its mayor) and an expansion in the Argentine Senate from 48 to 72 members (3 per province), which would assure the runner-up (presumably the UCR) the third seat; Menem, in return, secured his right to run for reelection.

Both men faced dissension in their parties' ranks after the 1994 reform of the Argentine Constitution was unveiled in August. Alfonsín's candidate in the UCR primaries, Río Negro Province Governor Horacio Massaccesi, defeated Federico Storani and Rodolfo Terragno for the nomination over their opposition to the Olivos Pact. Menem, in turn, had lost a number of Congressmen from his party after Carlos Álvarez led a center-left splinter group in revolt over Menem's privatizations and unchecked corruption. His Frente Grande had become influential after merging with fellow ex-Peronist José Octavio Bordón in 1994, ahead of the May 14, 1995, election date. Bordón, a popular Mendoza Province Senator was a centrist who also lent the leftist Álvarez, whose strength was in Buenos Aires, appeal in Argentina's hinterland (which had benefited least from the 1991-94 boom). They combined forces to create the FREPASO, adding Argentina's struggling Socialists.

The new constitutional rules governing elections provided opportunities for parties stuck in 2nd or 3rd place in the polls, as the Frepaso and UCR were, respectively. Bypassing the previous electoral college system, a victory by direct proportional voting could be achieved by either through a run-off election (in case no candidate obtained a clear majority). The Justicialists enjoyed a clear advantage, given polls and their control of both chambers of Congress; but cracks began to develop as 1994 drew to a close. Local prosperity, the guarantor of Menem's presumptive victory, was shaken by the Mexican peso crisis in December. Dependent on foreign investment to maintain its central bank reserves (which fell by US$6 billion in days), its sudden scarcity led to a wave of capital flight out of Buenos Aires' growing banks and to an unforeseen recession. Concurrent revelations of gross corruption surrounding the purchase of IBM computers for the antiquated National Bank of Argentina (the nation's largest), further added to the opposition's hopes that a runoff might still be needed in May.

Between them, the Frepaso enjoyed the advantage. Sporting charismatic leadership, they hoped to displace the UCR (Argentina's oldest existing party) from its role as the Peronists' chief opposition. The UCR had been badly tarnished by President Raúl Alfonsín's chaotic 1983-89 term, though its candidate, Río Negro Province Governor Horacio Massaccesi, had earned international renown in 1991 for storming a local National Bank branch in search of needed funds being retained by the federal government for what seemed to be political reasons. The UCR, moreover, still had its name recognition and organized, if frayed political machinery, controlled by Alfonsín and popular Córdoba Province Governor Eduardo Angeloz. As election day drew near, analysts debated not only the possibility of a runoff, but also which of the two opposition parties would face Menem in such a case.

Ultimately, corruption and the sudden recession were not enough to keep the unflappable Menem from a first-round victory. The big tent Justicialist Party, allied in many districts to local parties, formed an electoral front which obtained almost half of the total vote. The Frepaso garnered nearly 30%, and though their hopes for a runoff were stymied, this was considered a very good result for a party assembled only the previous year. Frepaso, however, came ahead in the presidential race only in two districts: Santa Fe Province and the city of Buenos Aires. The UCR, a major political force in Argentina since the beginning of the 20th century, came in third with only 17% of the vote.

All provinces except Corrientes also elected governors during 1995; several but not all provinces conducted their elections on the same date as the national one. A number of municipalities elected legislative officials (concejales) and in some cases also a mayor. The Justicialists obtained 14 of the 23 governorships and the UCR, 5. Among Argentina's larger cities, only Bahía Blanca and Mar del Plata kept a UCR mayor (though Buenos Aires would elect one in 1996).

The legislative elections, where half the seats in the Argentine Chamber of Deputies were contested, saw the Justicialists obtain a large majority (more votes that its two closest opponents combined), losing in only 5 districts out of 24; of the 130 seats in play, they secured 75, the UCR, 28 seats, and Frepaso obtained 20 seats. The UCR lost 15 and, on a district basis, they did not get the majority vote in any district. The Frepaso won in the city of Buenos Aires and picked up 12 seats. Local parties won in two districts (Salta Province and Neuquén Province). The newly expanded Argentine Senate, as Menem and Alfonsín had intended, benefited both parties.

== Candidates for president ==
- Justicialist Party (populist): President Carlos Menem of La Rioja Province.
- FrePaSo (social democrat): Former Governor José Octavio Bordón of Mendoza Province.
- Radical Civic Union (socio-liberal): Governor Horacio Massaccesi of Río Negro Province.

== Results ==
=== President ===
Candidate	Running mate	Party or alliance		Votes	%
Carlos Menem	Carlos Ruckauf	Justicialist; Front	Justicialist Party	6,300,057	36.22
Carlos Menem	Carlos Ruckauf	Justicialist; Front	Justicialist Front	691,481	3.98
Carlos Menem	Carlos Ruckauf	Justicialist; Front	Union of the Democratic Centre	456,594	2.62
Carlos Menem	Carlos Ruckauf	Justicialist; Front	Justicialist Front of Popular Unity	382,447	2.20
Carlos Menem	Carlos Ruckauf	Justicialist; Front	Front of Hope	215,531	1.24
Carlos Menem	Carlos Ruckauf	Justicialist; Front	Justicialist Front for Victory	129,290	0.74
Carlos Menem	Carlos Ruckauf	Justicialist; Front	Ethical Recovery Front	103,014	0.59
Carlos Menem	Carlos Ruckauf	Justicialist; Front	Front for Change	99,230	0.57
Carlos Menem	Carlos Ruckauf	Justicialist; Front	Retirees Front	74,561	0.43
Carlos Menem	Carlos Ruckauf	Justicialist; Front	Salta Renewal Party	73,202	0.42
Carlos Menem	Carlos Ruckauf	Justicialist; Front	Chaco Action	49,821	0.29
Carlos Menem	Carlos Ruckauf	Justicialist; Front	Federal Party of Buenos Aires City	48,287	0.28
Carlos Menem	Carlos Ruckauf	Justicialist; Front	Blockist Party of San Juan	32,841	0.19
Carlos Menem	Carlos Ruckauf	Justicialist; Front	Jujuy People's Movement	22,386	0.13
Carlos Menem	Carlos Ruckauf	Justicialist; Front	Movement for Jujuy Political Autonomy	4,935	0.03
Carlos Menem	Carlos Ruckauf	Justicialist; Front	Chubut Popular Movement	3,642	0.02
Carlos Menem	Carlos Ruckauf	Justicialist; Front	Total	8,687,511	49.94
José Octavio Bordón	Carlos Álvarez	FREPASO	Front for a Country in Solidarity	4,934,989	28.37
José Octavio Bordón	Carlos Álvarez	FREPASO	Broad Front Crusade	57,311	0.33
José Octavio Bordón	Carlos Álvarez	FREPASO	Broad Front	54,008	0.31
José Octavio Bordón	Carlos Álvarez	FREPASO	PAIS Front	28,382	0.16
José Octavio Bordón	Carlos Álvarez	FREPASO	Left Movement	21,414	0.12
José Octavio Bordón	Carlos Álvarez	FREPASO	Total	5,096,104	29.30
Horacio Massaccesi	Antonio María Hernández	UCR+MID	Radical Civic Union	2,773,037	15.94
Horacio Massaccesi	Antonio María Hernández	UCR+MID	Alliance for Patagonia	84,172	0.48
Horacio Massaccesi	Antonio María Hernández	UCR+MID	UCR–MID	57,082	0.33
Horacio Massaccesi	Antonio María Hernández	UCR+MID	Integration and Development Movement	30,588	0.18
Horacio Massaccesi	Antonio María Hernández	UCR+MID	Federal Party of Córdoba	11,258	0.06
Horacio Massaccesi	Antonio María Hernández	UCR+MID	Total	2,956,137	16.99
Aldo Rico	Julio César Fernández Pezzano	MODIN	Movement for Dignity and Independence	291,306	1.67
Aldo Rico	Julio César Fernández Pezzano	MODIN	Republican Force of Jujuy	15,602	0.09
Aldo Rico	Julio César Fernández Pezzano	MODIN	Independence Party	3,161	0.02
Aldo Rico	Julio César Fernández Pezzano	MODIN	Total	310,069	1.78
Fernando Solanas	Carlos Imizcoz	Southern Alliance (PCR–PCA)		71,625	0.41
Fernando López de Zavalía	Pedro Benejam	Republican Force of Tucumán		64,007	0.37
Luis Zamora	Silvia Susana Díaz	Workers' Socialist Movement		45,973	0.26
Jorge Altamira	Norma Graciela Molle	United Workers' Front	United Workers' Front–Workers' Party	28,329	0.16
Jorge Altamira	Norma Graciela Molle	United Workers' Front	Workers' Party	2,789	0.02
Jorge Altamira	Norma Graciela Molle	United Workers' Front	United Workers' Front	1,181	0.01
Jorge Altamira	Norma Graciela Molle	United Workers' Front	Total	32,299	0.19
Mario Mazzitelli	Alberto Raúl Fonseca	Authentic Socialist Party		32,174	0.18
Lía Méndez	Liliana Beatriz Ambrosio	Humanist Party		31,203	0.18
Alcides Christiansen	José Alberto Montes	Movimiento al Socialismo–Socialist Workers' Party		27,643	0.16
Humberto Tumini	Jorge Emilio Reyna	Free Homeland		24,326	0.14
Amílcar Santucho	Irma Antognazzi	MODEPA–S	Anti-Imperialist Popular Democratic Movement	12,919	0.07
Amílcar Santucho	Irma Antognazzi	MODEPA–S	Solidarity	147	0.00
Amílcar Santucho	Irma Antognazzi	MODEPA–S	Total	13,066	0.08
Ricardo Alberto Paz	Adolfo González Chávez	Front for Patriotic Coincidence		3,147	0.02
Total				17,395,092	100.00
Valid votes				17,395,092	95.72
Invalid votes				125,112	0.69
Blank votes				653,443	3.60
Total votes				18,173,647	100.00
Registered voters/turnout				22,178,201	81.94
Source: DINE, Ministry of the Interior

=== Chamber of Deputies ===
Party	Votes	%	Seats	
Party	Votes	%	Won	Total
Justicialist Front	8,371,132	49.38	75	145
Radical Civic Union	3,718,920	21.94	27	68
Front for a Country in Solidarity	3,599,764	21.23	21	26
Movement for Dignity and Independence	311,987	1.84	0	4
Democratic Progressive Party	158,857	0.94	1	2
Autonomist–Liberal–Democratic Progressive	158,269	0.93	2	4
Republican Force	119,546	0.71	1	2
Democratic Party	114,581	0.68	1	2
Southern Alliance (PCR–PCA)	83,434	0.49	0	0
Neuquén People's Movement	60,781	0.36	1	2
Authentic Socialist Party	38,909	0.23	0	0
Workers' Socialist Movement	31,062	0.18	0	0
Solidarity	21,718	0.13	0	0
Workers' Party	27,295	0.16	0	0
Free Homeland	19,685	0.12	0	0
MAS–PTS	21,925	0.13	0	0
Renewal Party of the Buenos Aires Province	13,414	0.08	0	0
Blue and White Movement	12,091	0.07	0	0
Solidarity Confederation	12,064	0.07	0	0
Labor Party	10,486	0.06	0	0
Fuegian People's Movement	7,683	0.05	1	2
Humanist Party	7,877	0.05	0	0
Centrist Front	4,437	0.03	0	0
Independent Call	4,257	0.03	0	0
Order and Justice	3,367	0.02	0	0
Chubut Action Party	3,313	0.02	0	0
Intransigent Party	2,484	0.01	0	0
Christian Democratic Party	2,255	0.01	0	0
Provincial Union	2,171	0.01	0	0
PAIS–Great Movement of Hope	1,616	0.01	0	0
Catamarca Unity Party	1,271	0.01	0	0
Jujuy Solidarity	1,258	0.01	0	0
Front for Patriotic Awareness	1,038	0.01	0	0
Popular Union	872	0.01	0	0
Salta Labor Party	752	0.00	0	0
Front of Hope (Catamarca)	654	0.00	0	0
Corrientes Action	581	0.00	0	0
Autonomist Party	562	0.00	0	0
Santa Cruz Unity Movement	528	0.00	0	0
Solidarity Movement	411	0.00	0	0
Modernist Force	404	0.00	0	0
Social Democratic Party	112	0.00	0	0
Total	16,953,823	100.00	130	257
Valid votes	16,953,823	93.34		
Invalid votes	122,995	0.68		
Blank votes	1,087,334	5.99		
Total votes	18,164,152	100.00		
Registered voters/turnout	22,177,954	81.90		
Source: DINE, Ministry of the Interior

==== Results by province ====
Province	PJ			UCR			FREPASO			Others		
Province	Votes	%	Seats	Votes	%	Seats	Votes	%	Seats	Votes	%	Seats
Buenos Aires	3,385,366	52.54	20	1,157,597	17.97	6	1,549,750	24.05	9	350,859	5.45	—
Buenos Aires City	804,419	39.94	4	408,537	20.28	3	704,720	34.99	5	96,455	4.79	—
Catamarca	58,720	51.36	1	37,695	32.97	—	14,734	12.89	1	3,190	2.79	—
Chaco	231,977	59.94	2	122,238	31.59	1	28,308	7.31	—	4,478	1.16	—
Chubut	73,001	49.48	2	57,211	38.78	1	12,280	8.32	—	5,035	3.41	—
Córdoba	695,125	46.67	4	585,612	39.31	4	184,957	12.42	1	23,879	1.60	—
Corrientes	123,398	32.28	2	52,485	13.73	—	40,362	10.56	—	166,012	43.43	2
Entre Ríos	269,578	47.35	2	211,686	37.18	2	72,242	12.69	—	15,846	2.78	—
Formosa	82,498	49.28	2	56,331	33.65	1	23,348	13.95	—	5,231	3.12	—
Jujuy	103,916	50.85	2	49,358	24.15	1	26,243	12.84	—	24,849	12.16	—
La Pampa	76,446	50.66	2	37,518	24.86	—	30,634	20.30	—	6,311	4.18	—
La Rioja	83,004	76.70	3	21,402	19.78	—	2,567	2.37	—	1,247	1.15	—
Mendoza	340,493	46.14	2	125,672	17.03	1	143,670	19.47	1	128,185	17.37	1
Misiones	178,162	50.26	2	143,519	40.49	2	24,207	6.83	—	8,611	2.43	—
Neuquén	48,032	27.39	1	20,940	11.94	—	39,201	22.35	—	67,216	38.32	1
Río Negro	94,058	44.05	2	92,047	43.11	1	24,739	11.59	—	2,695	1.26	—
Salta	272,224	71.15	4	55,623	14.54	—	38,116	9.96	—	16,647	4.35	—
San Juan	193,194	72.14	3	22,498	8.40	—	50,554	18.88	—	1,574	0.59	—
San Luis	88,884	61.16	2	29,038	19.98	—	24,700	17.00	—	2,710	1.86	—
Santa Cruz	37,514	58.76	2	14,706	23.03	—	9,613	15.06	—	2,009	3.15	—
Santa Fe	679,647	43.60	4	257,880	16.54	2	430,205	27.60	3	191,243	12.27	1
Santiago del Estero	202,323	72.00	3	62,864	22.37	1	13,687	4.87	—	2,132	0.76	—
Tierra del Fuego	15,519	45.43	2	7,566	22.15	—	2,573	7.53	—	8,505	24.90	1
Tucumán	233,634	41.72	2	88,897	15.88	1	108,354	19.35	1	129,088	23.05	1
Total	8,371,132	49.38	75	3,718,920	21.94	27	3,599,764	21.23	21	1,264,007	7.46	7

=== Governors ===
Election of Provincial Governors
Positions to be elected: 22 (the City of Buenos Aires in 1996 and Corrientes in 1997)
Province	Elected	Party	Map
Buenos Aires	Eduardo Duhalde R	Partido Justicialista	
Federal Capital (1996)	Fernando de la Rúa	Unión Cívica Radical	
Catamarca	Arnoldo Aníbal Castillo R	Unión Cívica Radical-Frente Cívico y Social	
Chaco	Ángel Rozas	Unión Cívica Radical	
Chubut	Carlos Maestro R	Unión Cívica Radical	
Córdoba	Ramón Mestre	Unión Cívica Radical	
Entre Ríos	Jorge Pedro Busti	Partido Justicialista	
Formosa	Gildo Insfrán	Partido Justicialista	
Jujuy	Guillermo Snopek	Partido Justicialista	
La Pampa	Rubén Marín R	Partido Justicialista	
La Rioja	Ángel Maza	Partido Justicialista	
Mendoza	Arturo Lafalla	Partido Justicialista	
Misiones	Ramón Puerta R	Partido Justicialista	
Neuquén	Felipe Sapag	Movimiento Popular Neuquino	
Río Negro	Pablo Verani	Unión Cívica Radical	
Salta	Juan Carlos Romero	Partido Justicialista	
San Juan	Jorge Escobar R	Partido Justicialista	
San Luis	Adolfo Rodríguez Saá R	Partido Justicialista	
Santa Cruz	Néstor Kirchner R	Partido Justicialista	
Santa Fe	Jorge Obeid	Partido Justicialista	
Santiago del Estero	Carlos Juárez	Partido Justicialista	
Tierra del Fuego	José Arturo Estabillo R	Fuegian People's Movement	
Tucumán	Antonio Domingo Bussi	Fuerza Republicana	
R: Re-elected
