= Broad Front (Argentina) =

Political party in Argentina

Broad Front Frente Grande
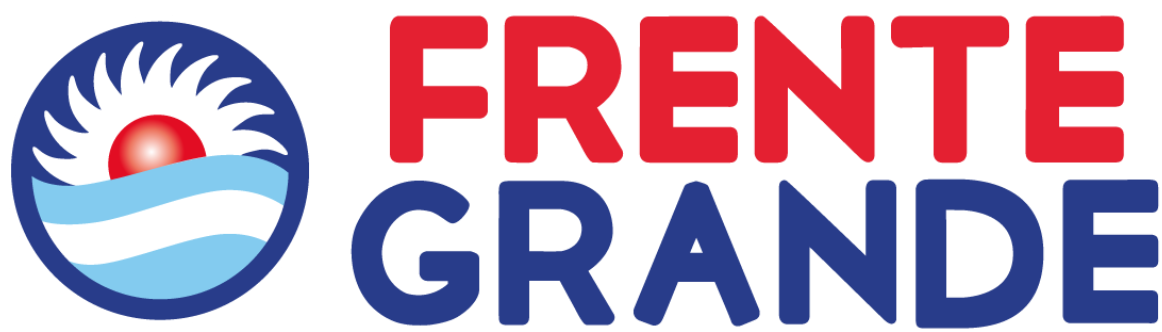
- President: Mario Secco
- Founded: 27 April 1993; 33 years ago
- Split from: Justicialist Party
- Youth wing: Juventud Nacional del Frente Grande
- Membership: ▲152,902 (2014)
- Ideology: Peronism; Progressivism; Social democracy Kirchnerism
- Political position: Centre-left to left-wing
- National affiliation: Homeland Force
- Regional affiliation: COPPPAL; São Paulo Forum
- Slogan: Otro país esta en Marcha (A different country is on the way)
- Seats in the Chamber of Deputies: 2 / 257
- Seats in the Senate: 0 / 72
- Province Governors: 0 / 24

Website
- http://www.frentegrande.org

The Broad Front (Spanish: Frente Grande, FG) is a centre-left to left-wing peronist political party in Argentina most prominent in the 1990s. The party is currently part of the former ruling Unión por la Patria coalition which supported Sergio Massa's presidential campaign.

== History ==
=== Foundation ===
The party was set up by a group of left-wing Justicialist Party members of the Argentine Chamber of Deputies, most notably Carlos Álvarez, and other left-wingers who were dissatisfied with the neo-liberal policies of President Carlos Menem, including dissident Christian Democrats led by Carlos Auyero and also figures such as Graciela Fernández Meijide. In 1990, the rebel Justicialists, having formed FredeJuSo, came together with the Communist Party of Argentina and others in a loose coalition. Álvarez proposed forming a unified party and dissolving the constituent members, thus automatically excluding the Communists, who left.

The Broad Front was officially created in May 1993, when Álvarez along with other members of the party joined forces with when two minor centre-left parties, Frente por la Democracia y la Justicia Social (FREDEJUSO) and Frente del Sur, a party set up by film-maker Pino Solanas, joined forces to form the Frente Grande. In the 1993 elections, the party's list in the city of Buenos Aires gained 38% of the vote and several deputies were elected around the country, including Álvarez, Meijide and Solanas. Solanas left the party a short while later over personal differences.

=== Early successes ===
Representing the left-wing dissident Peronists from the Justicialist Party, were able to achieve unexpectedly strong results in the 1993 Argentine legislative election and the 1994 Argentine Constitutional Assembly election. In spring 1994, Álvarez led the Frente Grande into a new alliance, creating the Front for a Country in Solidarity (FrePaSo). In the 1995 Argentine general election, FrePaSo secured second place, unexpectedly unseating the Radical Civic Union from its second place for the first time in decades.

In early 1996, Bordón, the FrePaSo’s presidential candidate, left the party after unsuccessfully attempting to challenge Álvarez’s leadership. By 1997, the UCR and FrePaSo formed a coalition Alliance for Work, Justice, and Education, which won the 1997 Argentine legislative election, proving a successful challenge to Menem. However, this greatly undermined Broad Front and its appeal - the core base of Broad Front, left-wing Peronists, found it unacceptable for the party to cooperate with the UCR, the traditional enemy of Peronism. As a result, the party entered decline.

=== Decline ===
In 1998 open primaries, the FG-FrePaSo candidate Graciela Fernández Meijide lost to Fernando de la Rúa of the UCR, who went on to win the 1999 Argentine general election. FrePaSo would continue the success of the Frente Grande and propel Álvarez to be vice-president of the country. In 2000, the FG-FrePaSo candidate Aníbal Ibarra became mayor of Buenos Aires. However, De la Rúa's governance showed little shift from Menem's neoliberalism.

Following the deepening economic crisis and corruption scandals, Álvarez resigned from the vice-presidency in October 2000. A few months later, in May 2001, Álvarez also stepped down as the leader of FG-FrePaSo and quit politics, prompting a crisis in the coalition. De la Rúa's administration suffered a disastrous defeat in the mid-term 2001 Argentine legislative election, and also led to the collapse of FrePaSo, as the voters punished the party for bringing in an economically neoliberal administration despite promising a social-democratic one.

The Frente Grande continued to be a force in Buenos Aires politics, but has become largely marginalised with the collapse of FrePaSo; its members have largely joined the new Support for an Egalitarian Republic (ARI) party or returned to the Peronists under centre-left Presidents Néstor Kirchner and his wife and successor Cristina Fernández de Kirchner.

=== Later history ===
What remained of the Front swung behind the Kirchners' ruling Front for Victory. At the 2005 legislative elections, however, some sections of the Front joined the Encuentro Amplio with other left-wing parties in Buenos Aires and Buenos Aires Province. The coalition did badly and lost its existing national representation. In 2007, members of the Front including María José Bongiorno were elected as part of the Front for Victory. Of its leading figures, Nilda Garré serves as Minister of Defense and party leader Eduardo Sigal is a junior official in the sub-secretariat of American Economic Integration and Mercosur.

In 2012, the party had 161,050 members, making it the third largest party nationwide.

== Ideology ==
The party has a left-wing Peronist background, and was formed by anti-Menemist Peronists, various left-leaning groups and parties such as Intransigent Party, and some members of the Communist Party of Argentina. It has a Peronist-like personalist structure, initially oriented around its long-time leader Carlos Álvarez. According to one of its founders, the human activist Graciela Fernández Meijide, Broad Front has "a moderate and democratic left identity with realistic goals, such as the improvement of wealth distribution, the safeguarding of people’s basic rights and the restoration of the institutional excellence of the Republic".

The Broad Front is described as progressive, and presents itself as a leftist and "true Peronist" opposition to the neoliberal economic and social model of its historical adversary, Menemism. Its program has also been described as populist, reformist and progressive, and its policies are considered "closely in line with social democracy". The party has various factions, "ranging from left-wing Peronism to diverse ideological currents of Marxism". The main ideological goal of the party is to represent a left-leaning Peronism, in opposition to right-wing factions of the movement.

== Electoral performance ==
=== President ===
Election year	Candidate	Coalition	1st round		2nd round		Result
Election year	Candidate	Coalition	# of overall votes	% of overall vote	# of overall votes	% of overall vote	Result
2003	Néstor Kirchner	Front for Victory	4,312,517	22.25	Unopposed		✓ 2nd-R Unopposed
2007	Cristina Kirchner	Front for Victory	8,651,066	45.29	—N/a		✓ Elected
2011	Cristina Kirchner	Front for Victory	11,865,055	54.11 (1st)	—N/a		✓ Elected
2015	Daniel Scioli	Front for Victory	9,338,449	37.08 (1st)	12,198,441	48.60 (2nd)	✗ 2-R Defeated
2019	Alberto Fernández	Frente de Todos	12,473,709	48.10 (1st)	—N/a		✓ Elected
