= Alliance for Work, Justice and Education =

Political coalition in Argentina

Alliance for Work, Justice and Education Alianza para el Trabajo, la Justicia y la Educación
- Abbreviation: ALIANZA
- Leader: Fernando De la Rúa
- Party Presidents: Raúl Alfonsín (UCR); Carlos Álvarez (FREPASO)
- Founded: 4 August 1997; 28 years ago
- Dissolved: 20 December 2001; 24 years ago
- Merger of: Radical Civic Union; Front for a Country in Solidarity
- Headquarters: Buenos Aires
- Ideology: Neoliberalism; Conservatism; Radicalism; Republicanism; Initially: Progressivism
- Political position: Centre-right to right-wing Initially: Centre to center-left
- Regional affiliation: COPPPAL; Foro de São Paulo
- International affiliation: Socialist International (UCR)
- Colours: Light blue

The Alliance for Work, Justice and Education (Spanish: Alianza para el Trabajo, la Justicia y la Educación), also known as the Alliance (Alianza) was a political coalition in Argentina in the early 21st century. It was born from the alliance of the Radical Civic Union, the Front for a Country in Solidarity (FREPASO) and several smaller provincial parties in 1997. It was initially a center-left alliance, before conservative sectors took over the coalition. The Alliance disintegrated in the aftermath of the December 2001 riots, with its members returning to their former parties or finding new ones.

== History ==
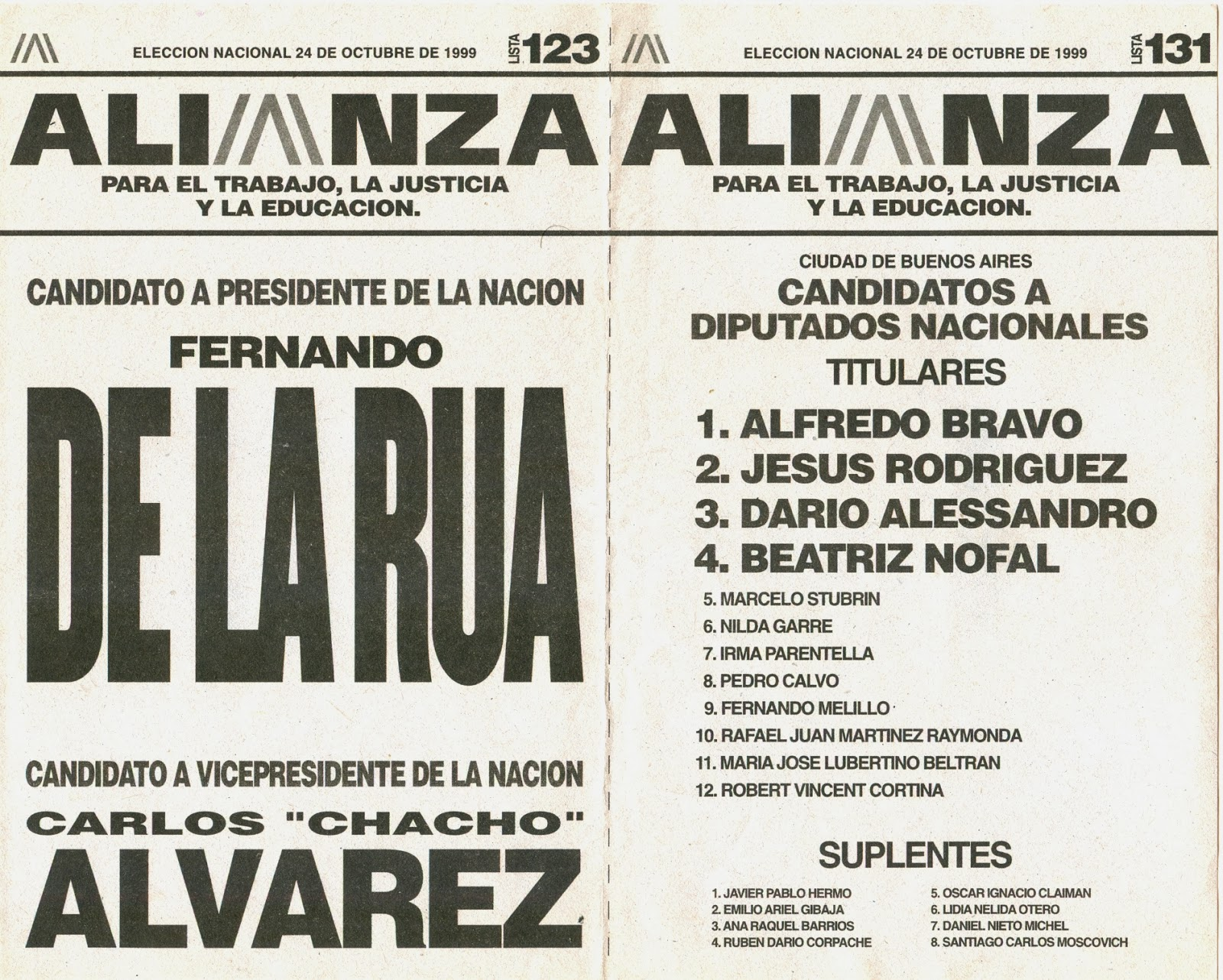
De la Rúa-Álvarez ballot for the 1999 general election

In the 1995 elections, then-president Carlos Menem was re-elected with 49,9% of the vote. The opposition had presented itself divided into two great forces, the Front for a Country in Solidarity (FREPASO), an alliance of parties that obtained 29,3% of the votes, and the Radical Civic Union (UCR) that obtained 17%. It was evident that together, both forces obtained an adhesion similar to that of Menem's Justicialist Party (PJ). The coalition first took part in the 1997 legislative elections in which they emerged victorious against the ruling Justicialist Party. In the 1999 general elections, the alliance put forward Fernando de la Rúa (UCR), who together with Carlos Álvarez (FREPASO) as his running mate, defeated Buenos Aires Governor and former Vice President under Menem Eduardo Duhalde (PJ).

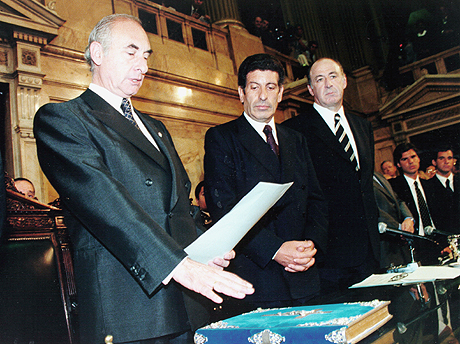
President De la Rua (UCR Leader) and Vice President Carlos "Chacho" Alvarez (FREPASO leader) on inauguration day on December 10, 1999

The Alliance presented itself as a progressive, moderate centre-left alternative to Menem's neoliberal government (stemming from the ideologies of the FREPASO and the UCR's pro-social democracy wing), with a mandate to end corruption and unemployment. However, De la Rúa soon revealed himself as unable or unwilling to tackle corruption and to revive the Argentine economy, which was in a recession, with innovative measures, and De la Rúa's own conservative wing within the UCR soon overtook the Alliance. In 2000, amid a scandal caused by accusations of bribery involving UCR senators and members of the cabinet, Álvarez resigned from the vice presidency, gravely hurting the unity of the Alliance. In the 2001 legislative elections, the Alliance suffered a large defeat, winning only 35 seats of the 127 contested seats in the Chamber of Deputies an only 26 seats out of 70 in the Senate The socio-economic situation worsened, and De la Rúa was forced to resign by the December 2001 riots. The Alliance soon disintegrated, its members returning to their former parties or finding new ones.

== See also ==
- Politics of Argentina
- December 2001 riots in Argentina
