= Federico Storani =

Argentine politician

Federico Storani (born 5 August 1950) is an Argentine politician, who served as Minister of the Interior during the presidency of Fernando de la Rúa between December 1999 and March 2001. A member of Radical Civic Union, he served several times as National Deputy representing the Buenos Aires Province.

He is the son of the renowned politician Conrado Storani. He grew up in Río Cuarto, Córdoba, where he made his elementary and high school. Then he moved to La Plata to study law where he obtained his degree at the National University of La Plata. He was elected to the Argentine congress in 1983 and the last time was in 2003.
