= Patricia Walsh =

Argentine politician (1952–2026)

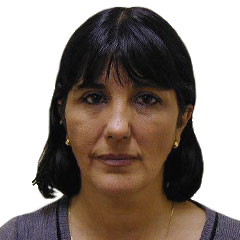
Patricia Walsh

Patricia Cecilia Walsh (Spanish pronunciation: [paˈtɾisja seˈsilja walʃ]; 24 October 1952 – 5 November 2026) was an Argentine political activist, who was the daughter of Rodolfo Walsh.

Walsh was a deputy in the Argentine national assembly for Buenos Aires city 2001–2005, and in 2003 she was a candidate in the Argentine presidential election. She was in Izquierda Unida, and has been involved in the campaign to find out what happened to her father.

Walsh died from respiratory failure on 5 November 2026, at the age of 74.
