= Front for a Country in Solidarity =

Left-wing political coalition in Argentina

Solidary Country Front Frente País Solidario
- Abbreviation: FREPASO
- Leader: Carlos Álvarez
- Founded: August 1994
- Dissolved: 20 December 2001
- Merger of: List: FG PCA PI PH FdS PDC PAIS PSP PSD
- Headquarters: Buenos Aires
- Ideology: Social democracy Anti-neoliberalism; Peronism; Factions: Christian democracy Democratic socialism Communism
- Political position: Center-left to left-wing
- National affiliation: The Alliance (1997–2001)
- Colours: Blue, red and yellow

The Front for a Country in Solidarity (Spanish: Frente País Solidario or FREPASO) was a center-left to left-wing political coalition in Argentina. Its leading figures were José Octavio Bordón, Carlos "Chacho" Álvarez and Graciela Fernández Meijide. It served as an alliance front of several leftist parties and anti-Menem Peronists to protest the neoliberal policies of President Carlos Menem.

== History ==
The coalition was formed in 1994 out of the Broad Front (Frente Grande), which had been founded mainly by progressive members of the Peronist Justicialist Party who denounced the neoliberal policies and alleged corruption of the Carlos Menem administration; the Broad Front joined with other dissenting Peronists, the Unidad Socialista (Popular and Democratic Socialist Party) and several other leftist parties and individuals.

Shortly after its foundation, the coalition contested the 1995 elections, with José Octavio Bordón running for president with Carlos "Chacho" Álvarez as running mate. While the coalition did not win the election, the campaign was considered nonetheless very successful for a newly-formed alliance, as Bordón came second with 29.3% of the vote. It overperformed the performance of the Broad Front from the 1993 election by five times, winning 21.0%, compared to Broad Front's 4.2%. FrePaSo also relegated UCR to a third place in the presidential election for the first time in decades.

Subsequently, Bordón proposed converting FrePaSo into a unified party, while Álvarez wanted a loose confederation of different parties. On May 17, 1995, Bordón and Álvarez announced the formation of a confederation, with a unified political platform and leadership, with the third largest block in the Argentine National Congress. The Intransigent Party and the Christian Democratic Party joined the coalition. Bordón later resigned after a leadership battle and returned to the Justicialist Party.

FrePaSo leaders believed that UCR divided the middle-class anti-PJ vote and considered it imperative to set aside programmatic differences and form a common front with the UCR to unseat the Justicialist Party. The FrePaSo campaigned for the 1999 elections in an alliance with the larger Radical Civic Union (UCR) and a few provincial parties, the Alliance for Work, Justice, and Education (known simply as the Alliance), which won the presidency for Fernando de la Rúa. The anti-Menem coalition of UCR and FrePaSo placed first in the 1999 presidential and general elections, ending a decade of Peronist dominance. This victory seemed to solidify FrePaSo's third party status, and several scholars believed that FrePaSo would become an institutionalized, permanent force in the Argentine politics.

Frepaso politician Aníbal Ibarra was elected Mayor of Buenos Aires in 2000 on the Alliance ticket. However, upon taking office, De la Rúa appointed a neoliberal José Luis Machinea as the Economy Minister, and announced cuts to education and social services. FrePaSo decried these policies, and vice president Chacho Álvarez resigned amidst public intra-party accusations of bribery in the Senate, followed shortly after by other leading members. In early 2001, De la Rúa implemented further spending cuts, leading to resignations and open rebellion against the government by FrePaSo and progressive elements of the UCR. De la Rúa retorted to ruling by decree and relying on Menemists.

Contrary to the expectations, De la Rúa's austerity policies did not result in growth. Instead, the recession persisted, and unemployment rose, while tax revenue continued to fall and offset the spending cuts. The voters now blamed the Alliance for the Argentina's recession and debt. Giovanni Grisendi argued that the Alliance government, and by extension FrePaSo which supported it, "now ‘owned’ Argentina’s recession and debt, creating a political crisis for the country’s new governing coalition." Further issues emerged in late 2000 when a major corruption scandal broke out regarding bribery in the Senate. Eleven senators were found to have accepted payments totaling four million US dollars to support the 2000 labor market reform. The payments originated from, among others, the Labor Secretary Alberto Flamarique, who was a member of FrePaSo.

After the 2001 elections, FrePaSo became the joint third largest party in the federal Chamber of Deputies, with 17 of 257 deputies. Following the December 2001 riots, the party disintegrated, owing to the continued economic crisis, corruption scandal, and the neoliberal policies of the government that it initially supported. Many members re-joined the Peronist movement within the centre-left Front for Victory faction of President Néstor Kirchner, with others supporting the ARI party of Elisa Carrió. Until 2007 the party nominally retained one senator, Vilma Ibarra, who sat as a lone 'Party for Victory' member but in practice supported the Front for Victory, for which she became a national deputy in 2007. Her brother Aníbal Ibarra was removed as Mayor of Buenos Aires in 2006 in the wake of the Cromañón nightclub fire.

== Member parties ==
Party	Leader (Note: At the time of the front's dissolution (2001))	Ideology
Broad Front	Graciela Fernández Meijide	Social democracy
Communist Party	Patricio Echegaray	Communism
Christian Democratic Party	Mario Alfredo Marturet	Christian democracy
Intransigent Party	Enrique Gustavo Cardesa	Social democracy
Humanist Party	Lía Méndez	Humanism
Popular Socialist Party	Guillermo Estévez Boero	Democratic socialism
Democratic Socialist Party	Alfredo Bravo	Social democracy
Open Politics for Social Integrity	José Octavio Bordón	Peronism
Front of the South	Fernando Solanas	Progressivism

== See also ==
- Alliance for Work, Justice and Education (ALIANZA)
- Carlos Chacho Álvarez
- Darío Alessandro
