= Enrique Olivera =

Argentine politician (1940–2014)

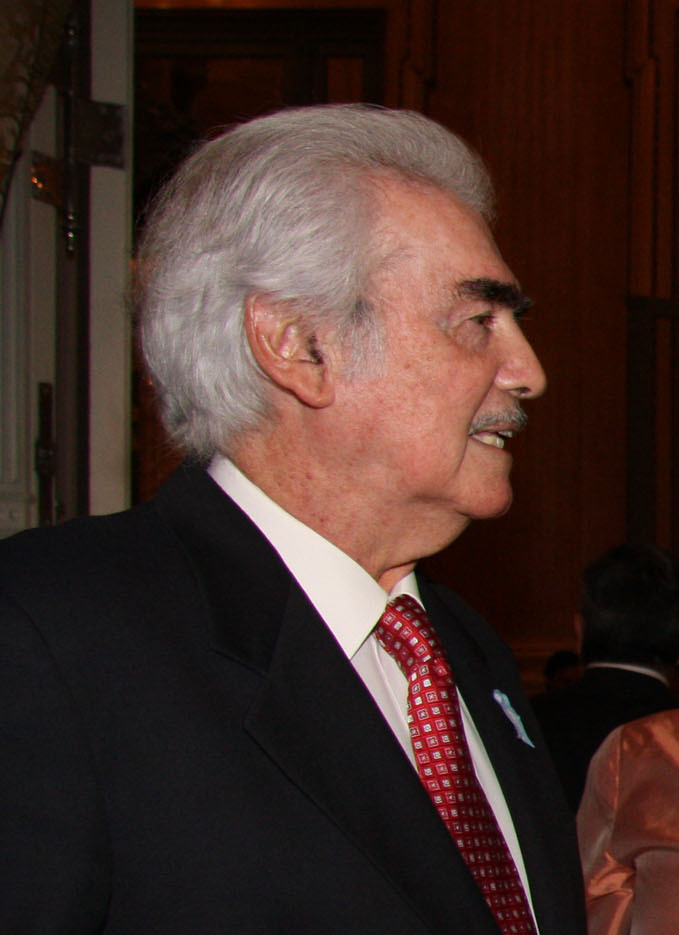

2nd Chief of Government of the City of Buenos Aires
- In office 10 December 1999 – 6 August 2000
- Preceded by: Fernando de la Rúa
- Succeeded by: Aníbal Ibarra

Personal details
- Born: 9 February 1940 Buenos Aires, Argentina
- Died: 4 November 2014 (aged 74) Buenos Aires, Argentina
- Party: Radical Civic Union (1983-2005) Civic Coalition ARI (2005-2014)

Enrique Olivera (8 February 1940 – 4 November 2014) was an Argentine politician who served as Chief of Government of the City of Buenos Aires from December 1999 to August 2000.

Olivera died in Buenos Aires on 4 November 2014, aged 74.

Political offices
Preceded by Fernando de la Rúa	Chief of Government of Buenos Aires City; 1999–2000	Succeeded by Aníbal Ibarra
