= United Left (Argentina) =

Argentine political alliance (1997-2005)

The United Left (Spanish: Izquierda Unida) was a political alliance in Argentina. It was an alliance of several groups, chiefly the Communist Party of Argentina and the Socialist Workers' Movement.

In the 2003 presidential elections, the party's candidate was former deputy Patricia Walsh, coming in seventh with 1.8 percent of the vote.
