= List of Argentine senators, 2001–2003 =

This is list of members of the Argentine Senate from 10 December 2001 to 9 December 2003.

== Composition ==
as of 9 December 2003

Bloc	Seats
Justicialist Party	40
Radical Civic Union	18
Civic and Social Front of Catamarca	2
Neuquén People's Movement	2
Republican Force	1
San Juan Renewal Crusade	1
Jujuy Civic Front	1
Broad Front	1
Frepaso	1
Independent Radical	1
Liberal Party of Corrientes	1
Salta Renewal Party	1
Vacant	2
Source: senado.gov.ar (archive)

== Senate leadership ==
Title	Officeholder	Bloc	Province
President of the Senate (Note: Ex officio as Vice President of Argentina.)	Vacant	—N/a	
Provisional President	Ramón Puerta (2001)	Justicialist Party	Misiones
Provisional President	Juan Carlos Maqueda (2002)	Justicialist Party	Córdoba
Provisional President	José Luis Gioja (2002–2003)	Justicialist Party	San Juan
Vice President	Marcelo López Arias	Justicialist Party	Salta
First Vice President	Raúl Baglini	Radical Civic Union	Mendoza
Second Vice President	Ricardo Gómez Diez	Salta Renewal Party	Salta

== Election cycles ==
For the first time since 1973, all seats in the Argentine Senate were renewed in the 2001 legislative election, following the implementation of a new system as per the 1994 constitutional amendment. Under the new system, a third of all seats were renewed for two year-terms (2001–2003), another third for four-year terms (2001–2005), and another third for full six-year terms (2001–2007). Which province was allocated two-year, four-year, or six-year terms was decided by draw. Accordingly, all of the senators listed here were elected in 2001.

Election	Term	
Election	Start	End
2001	10 December 2001	9 December 2003
2001	10 December 2001	9 December 2005
2001	10 December 2001	9 December 2007

== List of senators ==
Province	Senator	Party	Term	
Province	Senator	Party	From	To
Buenos Aires Province	Raúl Ricardo Alfonsín	Radical Civic Union	2001	2002 (Note: Resigned on 3 July 2002. Replaced by Diana Conti.)
Buenos Aires Province	Antonio Francisco Cafiero	Justicialist Party	2002 (Note: Since 4 January 2002. Replaced Eduardo Duhalde.)	2005
Buenos Aires Province	Diana Beatriz Conti	Frepaso	2002 (Note: Since 3 July 2002. Replaced Raúl Alfonsín.)	2005
Buenos Aires Province	Eduardo Alberto Duhalde	Justicialist Party	2001	2002 (Note: Resigned on 2 January 2002 to take office as interim President of Argentina. Replaced by Antonio Cafiero.)
Buenos Aires Province	Mabel Hilda Müller	Justicialist Party	2001	2005
Buenos Aires	Vacant	—N/a	2001	2003 (Note: Vacant until 10 December 2003. Gustavo Béliz, who had been elected in 2001, was not sworn in by the Senate due to a legal dispute regarding electoral alliances. The seat was eventually assumed by the next candidate in Béliz's list, María Laura Leguizamón.)
Buenos Aires	Vilma Lidia Ibarra	Broad Front	2001	2007
Buenos Aires	Rodolfo Terragno	Independent Radical	2001	2007
Catamarca	Eduardo Segundo Brizuela del Moral	Civic and Social Front of Catamarca	2001	2003
Catamarca	María Teresita del Valle Colombo de Acevedo	Civic and Social Front of Catamarca	2001	2003
Catamarca	José Luis Barrionuevo	Justicialist Party	2001	2003
Chaco	Jorge Milton Capitanich	Justicialist Party	2001	2007
Chaco	Mirian Belén Curletti	Radical Civic Union	2001	2007
Chaco	Eduardo Aníbal Moro	Radical Civic Union	2001	2003 (Note: Resigned on 4 December 2003. Replaced by Alicia Mastandrea.)
Chubut	Marcelo Alejandro Horacio Guinle	Justicialist Party	2001	2003
Chubut	Carlos Maestro	Radical Civic Union	2001	2003
Chubut	Marta Ethel Raso	Radical Civic Union	2001	2003
Córdoba	Norma Nélida Bermejo	Justicialist Party	2003 (Note: Since 20 August 2003. Replaced Beatriz Susana Halak.)	2003
Córdoba	Beatriz Susana Halak	Justicialist Party	2001	2003 (Note: Resigned on 6 August 2003. Replaced by Norma Nélida Bermejo.)
Córdoba	Juan Carlos Maqueda	Justicialist Party	2001	2002 (Note: Resigned on 27 December 2002 to be appointed as a minister of the Supreme Court of Argentina. Replaced by Jorge Luciano Montoya.)
Córdoba	Jorge Luciano Montoya	Justicialist Party	2003 (Note: Since 27 February 2003. Replaced Juan Carlos Maqueda.)	2003
Córdoba	Rubén Américo Martí	Radical Civic Union	2001	2003
Corrientes	Lázaro Alberto Chiappe	Liberal Party of Corrientes	2001	2003
Corrientes	Ángel Francisco Pardo	Justicialist Party	2001	2003
Corrientes	Isabel Viudes	Justicialist Party	2001	2001 (Note: Resigned on 12 December 2001. The seat remained vacant as Raúl Romero Feris, who had been elected in Viudes' list, was not allowed to be sworn in by the Senate due to the corruption charges pressed against him.)
Entre Ríos	Graciela Yolanda Bar	Justicialist Party	2001	2007
Entre Ríos	Jorge Pedro Busti	Justicialist Party	2001	2003 (Note: Resigned on 10 December 2003 to become Governor of Entre Ríos. Replaced by Laura Martínez Pass de Cresto.)
Entre Ríos	Ricardo César Taffarel	Radical Civic Union	2001	2007
Formosa	Marcela Fabiana Lescano	Radical Civic Union	2001	2005
Formosa	José Miguel Ángel Mayans	Justicialist Party	2001	2005
Formosa	Elva Azucena Paz	Justicialist Party	2001	2005
Jujuy	Lylia Mónica Arancio de Beller	Jujuy Civic Front	2001	2005
Jujuy	Guillermo Raúl Jenefes	Justicialist Party	2001	2005
Jujuy	Gerardo Rubén Morales	Radical Civic Union	2001	2005
La Pampa	Deolide Carmen Gómez de Bertone	Justicialist Party	2001	2003
La Pampa	Juan Carlos Passo	Radical Civic Union	2001	2003
La Pampa	Carlos Alberto Verna	Justicialist Party	2001	2003
La Rioja	Ada Mercedes Maza	Justicialist Party	2001	2005
La Rioja	Eduardo Menem	Justicialist Party	2001	2005
La Rioja	Jorge Raúl Yoma	Justicialist Party	2001	2005
Mendoza	Raúl Eduardo Baglini	Radical Civic Union	2001	2003
Mendoza	Jorge Alberto Pardal	Justicialist Party	2001	2003
Mendoza	María Cristina Perceval	Justicialist Party	2001	2003
Misiones	Mario Aníbal Losada	Radical Civic Union	2001	2005
Misiones	Mercedes Margarita Oviedo	Justicialist Party	2001	2005
Misiones	Federico Ramón Puerta	Justicialist Party	2001	2005
Neuquén	Sergio Adrián Gallia	Justicialist Party	2001	2007
Neuquén	Pedro Salvatori	Neuquén People's Movement	2001	2007
Neuquén	Luz María Sapag	Neuquén People's Movement	2001	2007
Río Negro	Luis Alberto Falcó	Radical Civic Union	2001	2007 (Note: Died on 28 July 2007. Replaced by Jacobo Abrameto.)
Río Negro	Amanda Mercedes Isidori	Radical Civic Union	2001	2007
Río Negro	Miguel Ángel Pichetto	Justicialist Party	2001	2007
Salta	Sonia Margarita Escudero	Justicialist Party	2001	2007
Salta	Ricardo Gómez Diez	Salta Renewal Party	2001	2007
Salta	Marcelo Eduardo López Arias	Justicialist Party	2001	2007
San Juan	Nancy Barbarita Avelín de Ginestar	San Juan Renewal Crusade	2001	2005
San Juan	José Luis Gioja	Justicialist Party	2001	2003 (Note: Resigned on 10 December 2003 to become Governor of San Juan. Replaced by Luis Eduardo Martinazzo.)
San Juan	Floriana Nélida Martin	Justicialist Party	2001	2005
San Luis	Jorge Alfredo Agundez	Radical Civic Union	2001	2005
San Luis	Liliana Teresita Negre de Alonso	Justicialist Party	2001	2005
San Luis	Raúl Ernesto Ochoa	Justicialist Party	2001	2005
Santa Cruz	Nicolás Alejandro Fernández	Justicialist Party	2001	2005
Santa Cruz	Cristina Elisabet Fernández de Kirchner	Justicialist Party	2001	2005
Santa Cruz	Carlos Alfonso Prades	Radical Civic Union	2001	2005
Santa Fe	Óscar Santiago Lamberto	Justicialist Party	2001	2003
Santa Fe	Roxana Itatí Latorre	Justicialist Party	2001	2003
Santa Fe	Horacio Daniel Usandizaga	Radical Civic Union	2001	2003
Santiago del Estero	María Elisa Castro	Justicialist Party	2001	2007
Santiago del Estero	Carlos Arturo Juárez	Justicialist Party	2001	2002 (Note: Resigned on 21 February 2002. Replaced by Mario Rubén Mera.)
Santiago del Estero	Mario Rubén Mera	Justicialist Party	2002 (Note: Since 2 March 2002. Replaced Carlos Juárez.)	2007
Santiago del Estero	José Luis Zavalía	Radical Civic Union	2001	2007
Tierra del Fuego	Mabel Luisa Caparrós	Justicialist Party	2001	2007
Tierra del Fuego	Mario Jorge Colazo	Radical Civic Union	2001	2004 (Note: Resigned on 10 January 2004 to become Governor of Tierra del Fuego. Replaced by Liliana Capos.)
Tierra del Fuego	Mario Domingo Daniele	Justicialist Party	2001	2007
Tucumán	José Alfredo Alperovich	Justicialist Party	2001	2003
Tucumán	Malvina María Seguí	Justicialist Party	2001	2003
Tucumán	Pablo Héctor Walter	Republican Force	2001	2003
