= 2003 Argentine general election =

- Presidential election
- 27 April 2003
- Registered: 25,481,410
- Turnout: 78.22%
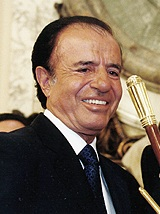

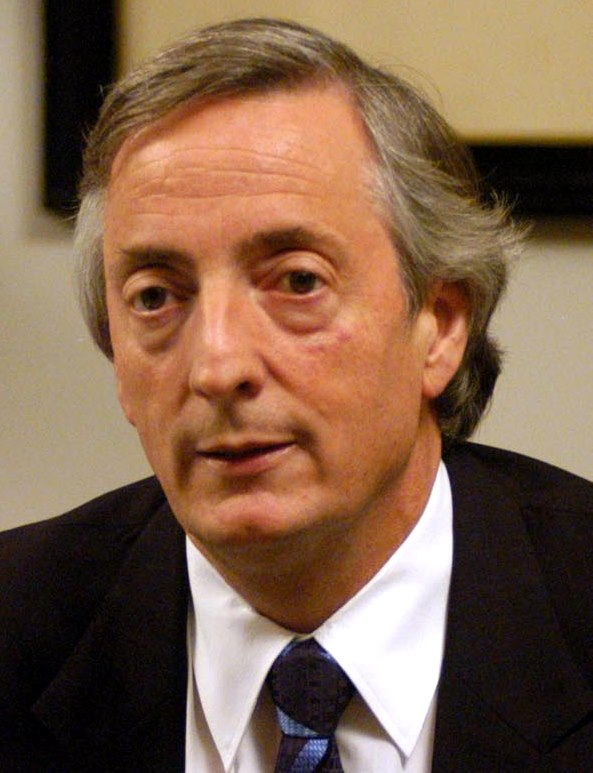

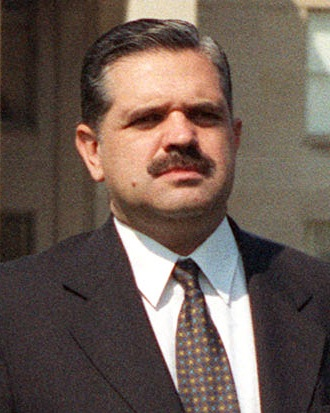

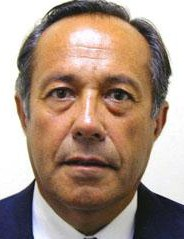

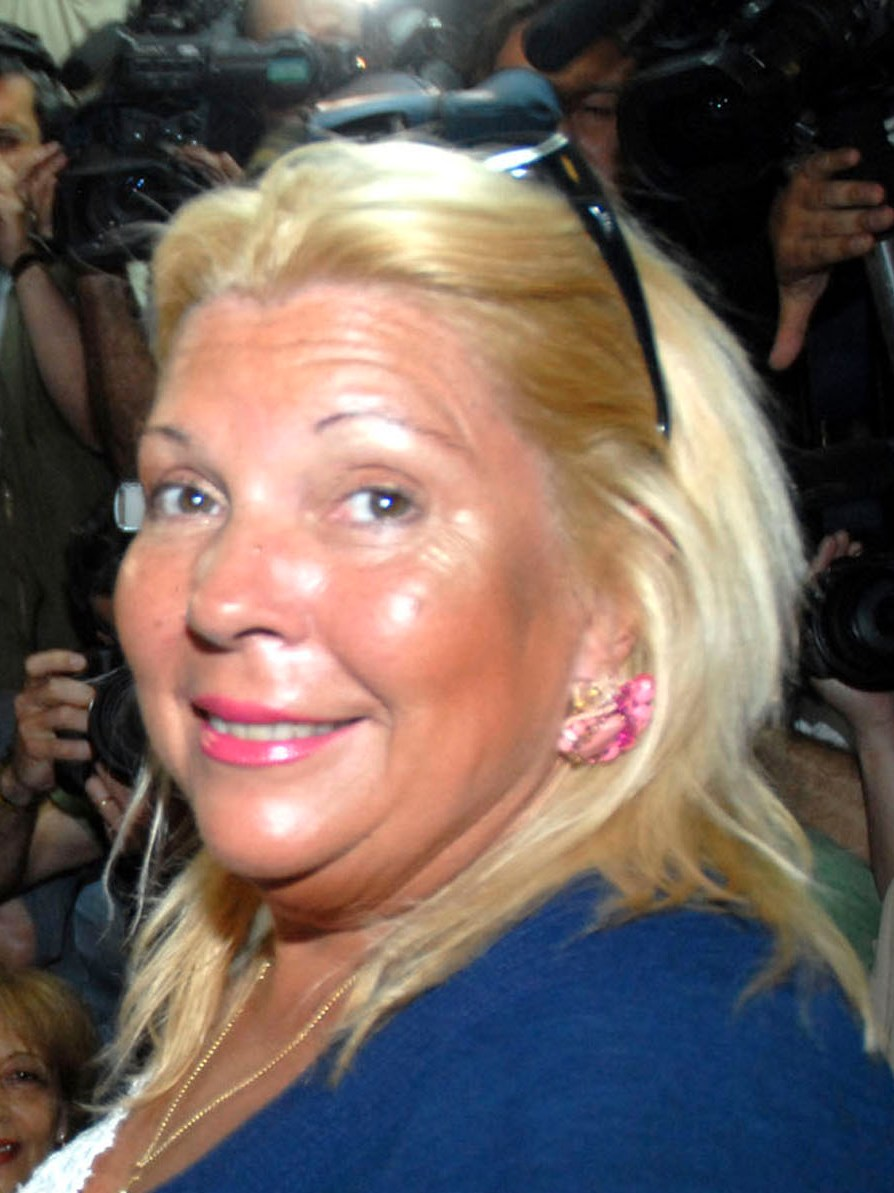
Nominee	Carlos Menem	Néstor Kirchner	Ricardo López Murphy
Party	PJ	PJ	Recrear
Alliance	Front for Loyalty	FPV-PJ	Recrear
Running mate	Juan Carlos Romero	Daniel Scioli	Ricardo Gómez Diez
Popular vote	4,741,200	4,313,131	3,173,584
Percentage	24.45%	22.25%	16.37%
Nominee	Adolfo Rodríguez Saá	Elisa Carrió
Party	PJ	ARI
Alliance	FMP–PUL
Popular vote	2,736,091	2,723,207
Percentage	14.11%	14.08%
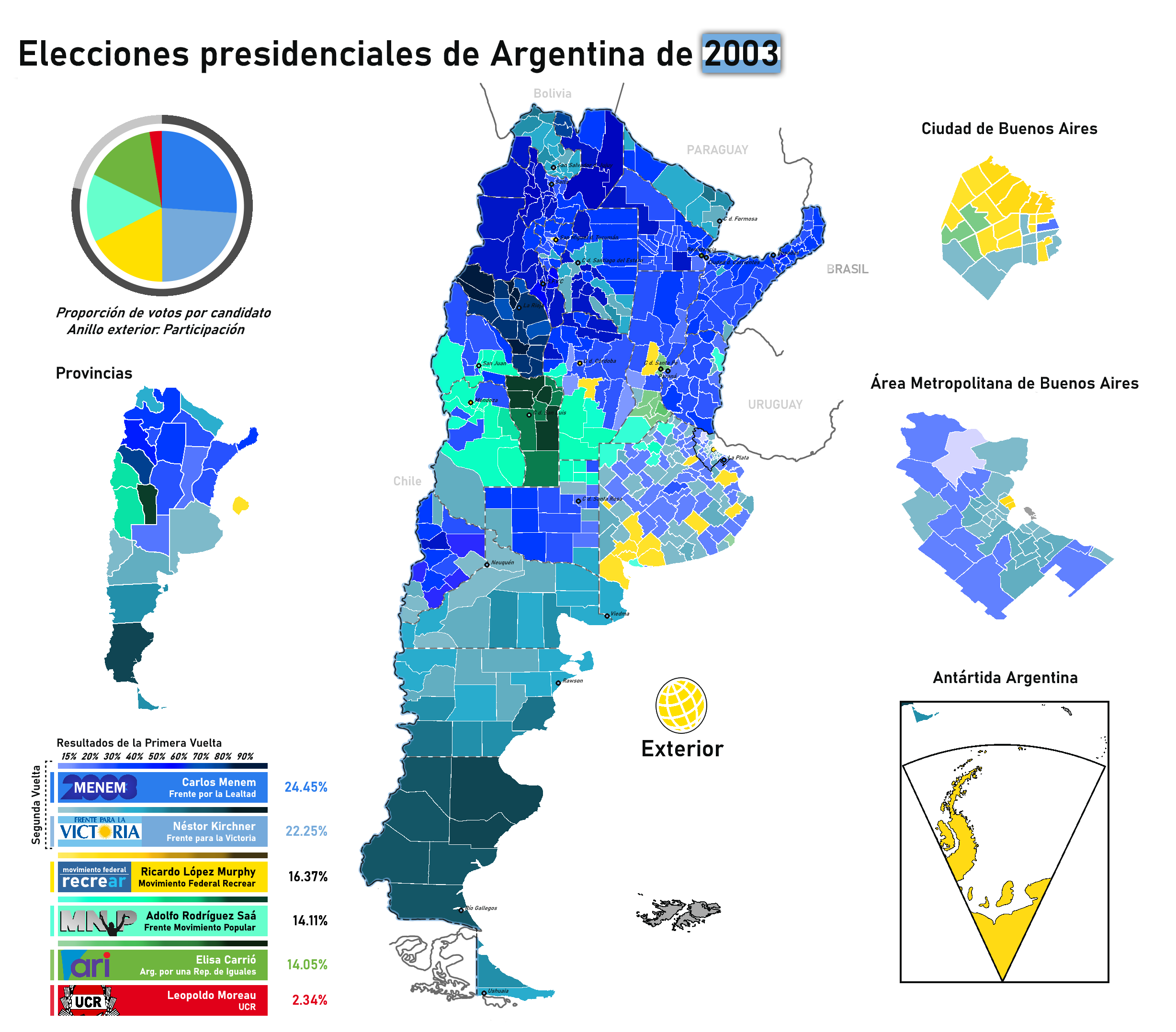
- First round results by province and department
President before election
Eduardo Duhalde
PJ
Elected President
Néstor Kirchner
FPV-PJ
- Chamber of Deputies
- 27 April 2003 to 23 November 2003
- 130 of the 257 seats in the Chamber of Deputies; 24 of 72 seats in the Senate
- Turnout: 71.88%
Party	Vote %	Seats	+/–
Justicialist Party	39.74	65	+14
Radical Civic Union	13.48	19	−47
Support for an Egalitarian Republic	9.74	11	New
Recreate for Growth	4.02	2	New
Commitment to Change	3.88	5	New
Buenos Aires Popular Front	3.86	5	New
Socialist Party	2.92	3	New
Federalist Action for Buenos Aires	2.76	3	+2
New Front	2.61	3	New
Self-determination and Freedom	1.32	2	New
Republican Force	0.80	2	+1
Frente de Todos	0.78	2	New
New Party	0.65	1	New
Salta Renewal Party	0.61	1	New
Neuquén People's Movement	0.58	2	+1
United for Salta (PJ–UCR)	0.43	1	New
Corrientes Project (PDP–PCP)	0.41	1	New
Civic and Social Front of Catamarca	0.40	2	New
This lists parties that won seats. See the complete results below.
- Senate
- 27 April 2003 to 23 November 2003
- 24 of the 72 seats in the Senate
- Turnout: 69.17%
Party	Vote %	Seats	+/–
Justicialist Party	40.51	12	−2
Radical Civic Union	15.60	5	−4
Socialist Party	9.42	1	New
New Front	7.62	1	New
Republican Force	3.12	2	+1
Front of Everyone (Corrientes)	2.74	2	New
New Party	2.25	1	New
This lists parties that won seats. See the complete results below.

General elections were held in Argentina on 27 April 2003. No presidential candidate received enough votes to win outright, but the scheduled runoff was cancelled when former president and first-round winner Carlos Menem pulled out just four days before the planned runoff on 18 May, handing the presidency to runner-up, Santa Cruz Province Governor Néstor Kirchner of the Front for Victory. Legislative elections were held on twelve dates, 27 April, 24 August, 31 August, 7 September, 14 September, 28 September, 5 October, 19 October, 26 October, 9 November, 16 November and 23 November. As of 2023, this marked the last time that both the president-elect and vice president-elect ticket were both men.

== Background ==
For the first time since the return of democracy in 1983, the Justicialist Party (PJ) failed to agree on a single presidential candidate. Three credible Peronist candidates ran in the election: center-right former President Carlos Menem, center-left Santa Cruz Province Governor Néstor Kirchner, and centrist former president Adolfo Rodríguez Saá. None were officially supported by the party, though President Eduardo Duhalde publicly endorsed Governor Kirchner on January 15, 2003. The PJ suspended its January 24 convention, opting to allow the three contenders to run on the Peronist mantle. None of the candidates were allowed to use the traditional Peronist iconography in detriment of the others.

For the first time since 1916, the UCR did not field a presidential candidate. After the political collapse at the peak of the economic crisis that led to the resignation of President Fernando de la Rúa at the end of 2001, popular support for the UCR was at historically low levels. Two strong former members of the UCR founded parties based on their politics: Congresswoman Elisa Carrió founded a left-of-center party, the ARI, and economist Ricardo López Murphy founded a right-wing one, Recreate for Growth.

These five strong candidates were practically tied in all the pre-election polls. Menem obtained the most votes in the first round, but far short of a first-round victory (about 24%), so a runoff election against Kirchner was required, and was scheduled for May 18. However, after two terms in office from 1989 to 1999, Menem's popularity remained very low. All signs pointed to a record victory for Kirchner (polls showed him leading Menem by anywhere from a 35 to a 50% margin). Rather than face a humiliating defeat, Menem withdrew from the runoff on May 14, a move that was roundly criticized by the other candidates. The courts refused to authorize a new election, and also refused to sanction a runoff between Kirchner and López Murphy (though the latter let it be known he would not take part in any case). Finally, Congress sanctioned Kirchner as president-elect, with the lowest vote share ever recorded for a president in a free election.

=== Legislative races ===
Legislative and gubernatorial elections were held throughout 2003, with polls open in different provinces between April and November; average turnout was 70.8%.

These elections were unprecedented in their staggered scheduling; indeed, legislators and governors were chosen over 12 different dates, during 2003. They were also, however, a return to political normalcy following a chaotic and economically depressed 2002.

The Justicialist Party, which was divided among three candidates in the presidential race, remained largely united in legislative and local races. They added 12 seats in the Argentine Chamber of Deputies, as well as 2 governorships, and fears of a high number of dissident tickets did not materialize.

The centrist Radical Civic Union, senior partners in the ill-fated Alliance that had returned them to power in 1999, were left with their smallest representation since 1954, though they were not replaced by the center-left ARI in a significant way; the ARI added but 2 Congressmen.

Voters sentiment improved over 2001 levels (when the sentiment among many was that "they should all go"), though not significantly. Turnout increased only modestly, and the use of invalid votes declined from 24% to 15% from the tense 2001 elections. Voters in the important Santa Fe Province, in particular, curbed their use of spoiled ballots from 30% to 20%.

Kirchner ended 2003 on a more secure footing than before these local and legislative elections. He benefited from allies such as the new governor of the paramount Buenos Aires Province, Felipe Solá, as well as the Mayor of Buenos Aires, Aníbal Ibarra. Argentina celebrated 20 years of continuous democratic rule on December 10, 2003, with a new government carrying generous numbers of allies in Congress and the provinces, as well as voters' high expectations.

== Results ==
=== President ===
Candidate	Running mate	Party or alliance		Votes	%
Carlos Menem	Juan Carlos Romero	Front for Loyalty	Front for Loyalty	3,776,867	19.48
Carlos Menem	Juan Carlos Romero	Front for Loyalty	Union of the Democratic Centre	964,333	4.97
Carlos Menem	Juan Carlos Romero	Front for Loyalty	Total	4,741,200	24.45
Néstor Kirchner	Daniel Scioli	Front for Victory		4,313,131	22.25
Ricardo López Murphy	Ricardo Gómez Diez	Recreate for Growth		3,173,584	16.37
Adolfo Rodríguez Saá	Melchor Posse	FMP–PUL	Popular Movement Front	2,340,355	12.07
Adolfo Rodríguez Saá	Melchor Posse	FMP–PUL	Unity and Liberty Party	395,736	2.04
Adolfo Rodríguez Saá	Melchor Posse	FMP–PUL	Total	2,736,091	14.11
Elisa Carrió	Gustavo Gutiérrez	Support for an Egalitarian Republic		2,723,207	14.05
Leopoldo Moreau	Mario Losada	Radical Civic Union		453,373	2.34
Patricia Walsh	Marcelo Parrilli	United Left		332,703	1.72
Alfredo Bravo	Rubén Giustiniani	Socialist Party		217,387	1.12
Jorge Altamira	Eduardo Salas	Workers' Party		139,402	0.72
Enrique Carlos Venturino	Federico Pinto Kramer	All of Them Must Go Confederation		129,782	0.67
Guillermo Sullings	Liliana Ambrosio	Humanist Party		105,705	0.55
José Carlos Arcagni	Marcelo Daniel Zenof	Arcahgni–Zenof	Times of Changes Alliance	54,873	0.28
José Carlos Arcagni	Marcelo Daniel Zenof	Arcahgni–Zenof	Popular Union	8,511	0.04
José Carlos Arcagni	Marcelo Daniel Zenof	Arcahgni–Zenof	Total	63,384	0.33
Mario Mazzitelli	Adrián Rodolfo Camps	Authentic Socialist Party		50,303	0.26
Carlos Zaffore	Elsa Fabiana Perié	Integration and Development Movement		47,954	0.25
Manuel Eduardo Herrera	Eduardo Alfredo Cúneo	Christian Democratic Party		47,755	0.25
Gustavo Breide Obeid	Ramiro Vasena	People's Reconstruction Party		42,461	0.22
Juan Ricardo Mussa	Roberto Natalio Suárez	United or Dominated Alliance		39,507	0.20
Ricardo César Terán	José Alejandro Bonacci	Movement for Dignity and Independence		31,766	0.16
Total				19,388,695	100.00
Valid votes				19,388,695	97.28
Invalid votes				345,651	1.73
Blank votes				196,563	0.99
Total votes				19,930,909	100.00
Registered voters/turnout				25,481,410	78.22

=== Chamber of Deputies ===
Party	Votes	%	Seats	
Party	Votes	%	Won	Total
Justicialist Party	6,250,817	39.74	65	132
Radical Civic Union	2,120,625	13.48	19	54
Support for an Egalitarian Republic	1,532,737	9.74	11	17
Recreate for Growth	632,303	4.02	2	3
Commitment to Change (Note: 3 seats for Justicialist Party and 2 seats for Commitment to Change.)	611,013	3.88	5	5
Buenos Aires Popular Front	606,886	3.86	5	5
Socialist Party	459,899	2.92	3	4
Federalist Action for Buenos Aires	433,369	2.76	3	5
New Front	410,340	2.61	3	3
United Left	387,570	2.46	0	1
Self-determination and Freedom	208,238	1.32	2	4
Humanist Party	166,849	1.06	0	0
Workers' Party	151,363	0.96	0	0
Republican Force	125,954	0.80	2	3
Frente de Todos (Note: 2 seats for Justicialist Party.)	121,992	0.78	2	2
Autonomist Party	110,757	0.70	0	0
New Party	102,764	0.65	1	1
Salta Renewal Party	95,845	0.61	1	2
Neuquén People's Movement	90,740	0.58	2	4
Will for Integration and Authentic Development	74,911	0.48	0	0
Democratic Party	72,935	0.46	0	1
United for Salta (PJ–UCR) (Note: 1 seat for Justicialist Party.)	68,216	0.43	1	1
Corrientes Project (PDP–PCP)	65,188	0.41	1	1
Civic and Social Front of Catamarca (Note: 1 seat for Justicialist Party and 1 seat for Radical Civic Union.)	63,415	0.40	2	2
Authentic Socialist Party	64,276	0.41	0	1
Christian Democratic Party	51,449	0.33	0	0
Social Pole	53,592	0.34	0	4
Integration and Development Movement	48,185	0.31	0	0
Socialist Workers' Party	42,339	0.27	0	0
Buenos Aires Changes Front	42,268	0.27	0	0
People's Reconstruction Party	37,793	0.24	0	0
Labor Party of Tucumán	37,327	0.24	0	0
Liberal Party of Corrientes	35,570	0.23	0	0
Movimiento al Socialismo	33,000	0.21	0	0
Provincial Neighborhood Movement	30,448	0.19	0	0
Río Negro Action Movement	24,011	0.15	0	0
Federal Integration Movement	22,102	0.14	0	0
Renewal Crusade	21,485	0.14	0	0
Democratic Renewal	20,209	0.13	0	0
People's Party	16,279	0.10	0	0
Our Commitment	16,078	0.10	0	0
Broad Front	14,353	0.09	0	0
Authentic Party	14,069	0.09	0	0
White Party	13,446	0.09	0	0
Chubut Action Party	13,073	0.08	0	0
People First	10,441	0.07	0	0
New Party of Solidary Action	9,927	0.06	0	0
Broad Front of Work and Production	8,299	0.05	0	0
Citizen Dignity	6,310	0.04	0	0
Movement for the Unit of Neuquén	5,936	0.04	0	0
Freedom and Responsible Democracy	5,782	0.04	0	0
Retirees in Action Party	4,673	0.03	0	0
Front for Change	4,617	0.03	0	0
Retirees and Youth Movement	4,429	0.03	0	0
San Luis Force	4,101	0.03	0	0
Citizen Action Party	3,917	0.02	0	0
Fuegian People's Movement	3,731	0.02	0	0
Movement for the Recovery of the Republic	3,182	0.02	0	0
Popular Participation Party	3,136	0.02	0	0
Movement for Everyone	2,977	0.02	0	0
Fuegian Federal Party	2,828	0.02	0	0
New People	2,783	0.02	0	0
Federal Party	2,674	0.02	0	0
Action for the Republic	2,380	0.02	0	1
Conservative People's Party	2,069	0.01	0	0
Revolutionary Socialist League	2,015	0.01	0	0
Río Gallegos Neighborhood Movement	1,961	0.01	0	0
White Party of Buenos Aires City	1,868	0.01	0	0
PFTDJUCBA	1,702	0.01	0	0
Republican Reconstruction Party	1,628	0.01	0	0
New Social Hope	1,579	0.01	0	0
Independents for Change	1,509	0.01	0	0
Republican Integration Circle	1,421	0.01	0	0
Provincial Defence–White Flag	1,388	0.01	0	0
Party of the Current	1,280	0.01	0	0
Socialist Convergence	1,003	0.01	0	0
Front of the People	590	0.00	0	0
Populist Unification	439	0.00	0	0
Patriotic Liberation Movement	419	0.00	0	0
Front of Social Integration for a Change in Freedom			–	1
Total	15,729,072	100.00	130	257
Valid votes	15,729,072	85.55		
Invalid votes	237,200	1.29		
Blank votes	2,419,921	13.16		
Total votes	18,386,193	100.00		
Registered voters/turnout	25,578,509	71.88		

=== Senate ===
Party	Votes	%	Seats	
Party	Votes	%	Won	Total
Justicialist Party	1,849,466	40.51	12	40
Radical Civic Union	712,289	15.60	5	22
Socialist Party	430,216	9.42	1	1
New Front	348,079	7.62	1	1
Support for an Egalitarian Republic	218,202	4.78	0	0
Recreate for Growth	180,082	3.94	0	0
Republican Force	142,422	3.12	2	2
Frente de Todos (Note: 1 seat for Justicialist Party and 1 seat for Radical Civic Union.)	125,147	2.74	2	2
New Party	102,776	2.25	1	1
Democratic Party	73,073	1.60	0	0
Corrientes Project (PDP–PCP)	69,207	1.52	0	0
United Left	62,816	1.38	0	0
Humanist Party	34,575	0.76	0	0
Liberal Party of Corrientes	33,972	0.74	0	0
Labor Party of Tucumán	29,451	0.65	0	0
Democratic Renewal	21,233	0.47	0	0
Workers' Party	20,903	0.46	0	0
White Party	13,545	0.30	0	0
Social Pole	12,554	0.27	0	0
Chubut Action Party	12,519	0.27	0	0
Socialist Workers' Party	11,771	0.26	0	0
People First	10,447	0.23	0	0
New Party of Solidary Action	9,975	0.22	0	0
Broad Front of Work and Production	8,437	0.18	0	0
Christian Democratic Party	6,330	0.14	0	0
People's Reconstruction Party	5,379	0.12	0	0
Movement for Dignity and Independence	3,719	0.08	0	0
Authentic Socialist Party	3,218	0.07	0	0
Popular Participation Party	3,053	0.07	0	0
New People	2,747	0.06	0	0
Autonomist Party	2,568	0.06	0	0
Provincial Defence–White Flag	1,513	0.03	0	0
Patriotic Movement	1,317	0.03	0	0
Republican Integration Circle	1,302	0.03	0	0
Populist Unification	419	0.01	0	0
Patriotic Liberation Movement	413	0.01	0	0
Salta Renewal Party			–	1
Neuquén People's Movement			–	2
Total	4,565,135	100.00	24	72
Valid votes	4,565,135	84.85		
Invalid votes	89,272	1.66		
Blank votes	726,039	13.49		
Total votes	5,380,446	100.00		
Registered voters/turnout	7,779,040	69.17		

=== Governors and Mayor of Buenos Aires ===
Provincial officials in all districts except Corrientes Province, were elected, as well as the Chief of Government of the City of Buenos Aires. The Justicialist Party wrested two governorships from the UCR (Chubut and Entre Ríos Provinces), and the UCR recovered Tierra del Fuego from the Justicialists.

District	Elected Governor	Party	%	Runner-up	Party	%
Buenos Aires	Felipe Solá	Justicialist	43.3	Luis Patti	Federalist Unity Party	13.3
Catamarca	Eduardo Brizuela del Moral	Civic Social Front (UCR)	50.8	Luis Barrionuevo	Justicialist Front	43.5
Chaco	Roy Nikisch	UCR	53.4	Jorge Capitanich	Front for Victory	40.9
Chubut	Mario das Neves	Justicialist	45.6	José Lizurume ^{L}	UCR	41.2
City of Buenos Aires^{1}	Aníbal Ibarra ^{R}	Great Front	53.5	Mauricio Macri	Commitment to Change	46.5
Córdoba	José Manuel de la Sota ^{R}	Justicialist	51.8	Oscar Aguad	UCR	37.2
Entre Ríos	Jorge Busti	Justicialist	44.6	Sergio Varisco	Social Front Alliance	34.4
Formosa	Gildo Insfrán ^{R}	Justicialist	71.8	Gabriel Hernández	Front for All	24.4
Jujuy	Eduardo Fellner ^{R}	Justicialist	55.8	Gerardo Morales	UCR	35.2
La Pampa	Carlos Verna	Justicialist	49.1	Francisco Torroba	Alternative Front	25.5
La Rioja	Ángel Maza ^{R}	Justicialist	55.4	Jorge Yoma	Work and Production Front	43.4
Mendoza	Julio Cobos	UCR	42.9	Guillermo Amstutz	Justicialist	35.7
Misiones	Carlos Rovira ^{R}	Renewal Front	47.9	Ramón Puerta	Justicialist	32.4
Neuquén	Jorge Sobisch ^{R}	Neuquén People's Movement	56.1	Aldo Duzdevich	Justicialist	19.9
Río Negro	Miguel Saiz	UCR	32.6	Julio Arriaga	Great Front	20.4
Salta	Juan Carlos Romero ^{R}	Justicialist	49.7	Andrés Zottos	Salta Renewal Party	24.4
San Juan	José Luis Gioja	Justicialist	41.4	Roberto Basualdo	Life and Commitment Front	30.8
San Luis	Alberto Rodríguez Saá	Justicialist	90.1	Marcelo Shortrede	Fatherland and Family Movement	5.5
Santa Cruz	Sergio Acevedo	Justicialist	70.9	Anselmo Martínez	Convergence for Santa Cruz	27.9
Santa Fe	Jorge Obeid	Justicialist	43.2	Hermes Binner	Socialist Party	38.3
Santiago del Estero^{2}	Mercedes Aragonés de Juárez ^{R}	Justicialist	68.1	José Luis Zavalía	UCR	13.0
Tierra del Fuego	Jorge Colazo	UCR	52.8	Carlos Manfredotti ^{L}	Justicialist	47.2
Tucumán	José Alperovich	Justicialist	44.4	Esteban Jerez	Union for Tucumán	25.8
1: The City of Buenos Aires is not a province but an autonomous federal territory. The head of the local Executive is referred to as "Government Chief." 2: Election held 15 September 2002. R: Reelected. L: Incumbent lost.
