= 1999 Argentine general election =

- Presidential election
- 24 October 1999
- Registered: 24,111,270
- Turnout: 82.32%
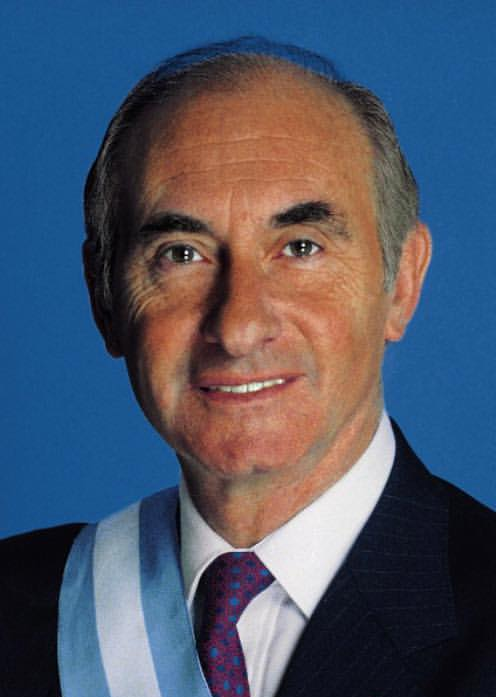

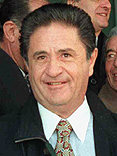

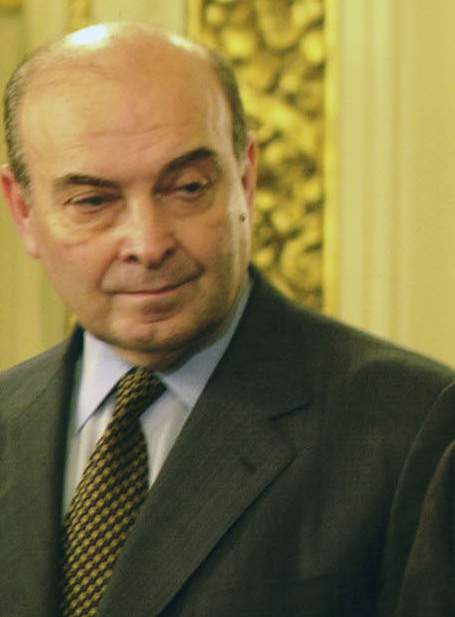
Nominee	Fernando de la Rúa	Eduardo Duhalde	Domingo Cavallo
Party	UCR	PJ	AxR
Alliance	Alianza	CJ	AxR
Running mate	Carlos Álvarez	Palito Ortega	Armando Caro Figueroa
Popular vote	9,167,220	7,255,586	1,937,544
Percentage	48.37%	38.28%	10.22%
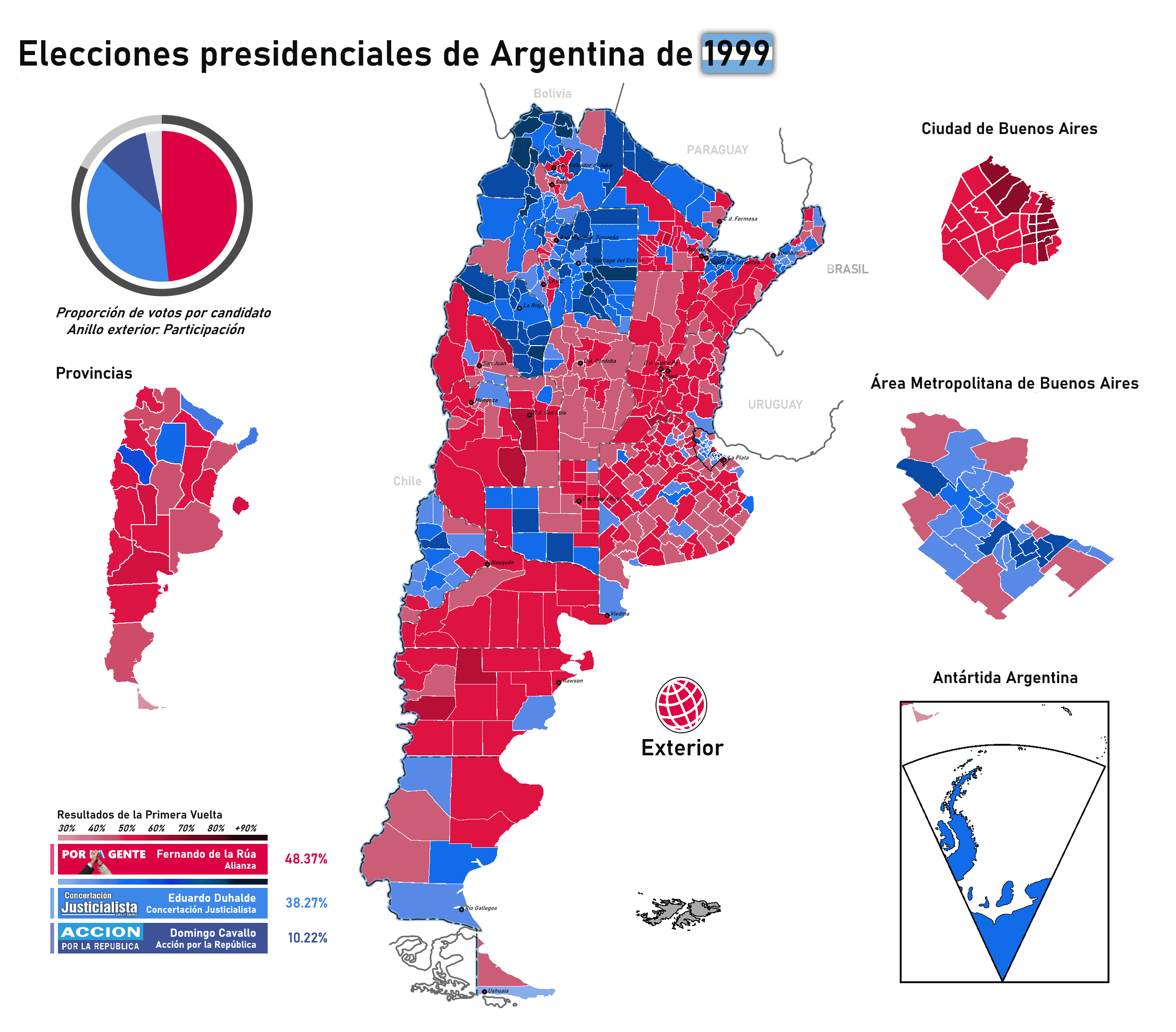
- Most voted-for party by province (left) and department (right)
President before election
Carlos Menem
Justicialist Party
Elected President
Fernando de la Rúa
Radical Civic Union
- Chamber of Deputies
- 8 August 1999 to 24 October 1999
- 130 of the 257 seats in the Chamber of Deputies
- Turnout: 82.27%
Party	Vote %	Seats	+/–
Alliance for Work, Justice and Education	45.89	66	+15
Justicialist Party	38.63	51	−24
Action for the Republic	8.12	9	New
Buenos Aires Unity Party	1.57	1	New
Democratic Party	1.27	1	0
Republican Force	0.54	1	0
Neuquén People's Movement	0.48	1	0
This lists parties that won seats. See the complete results below.
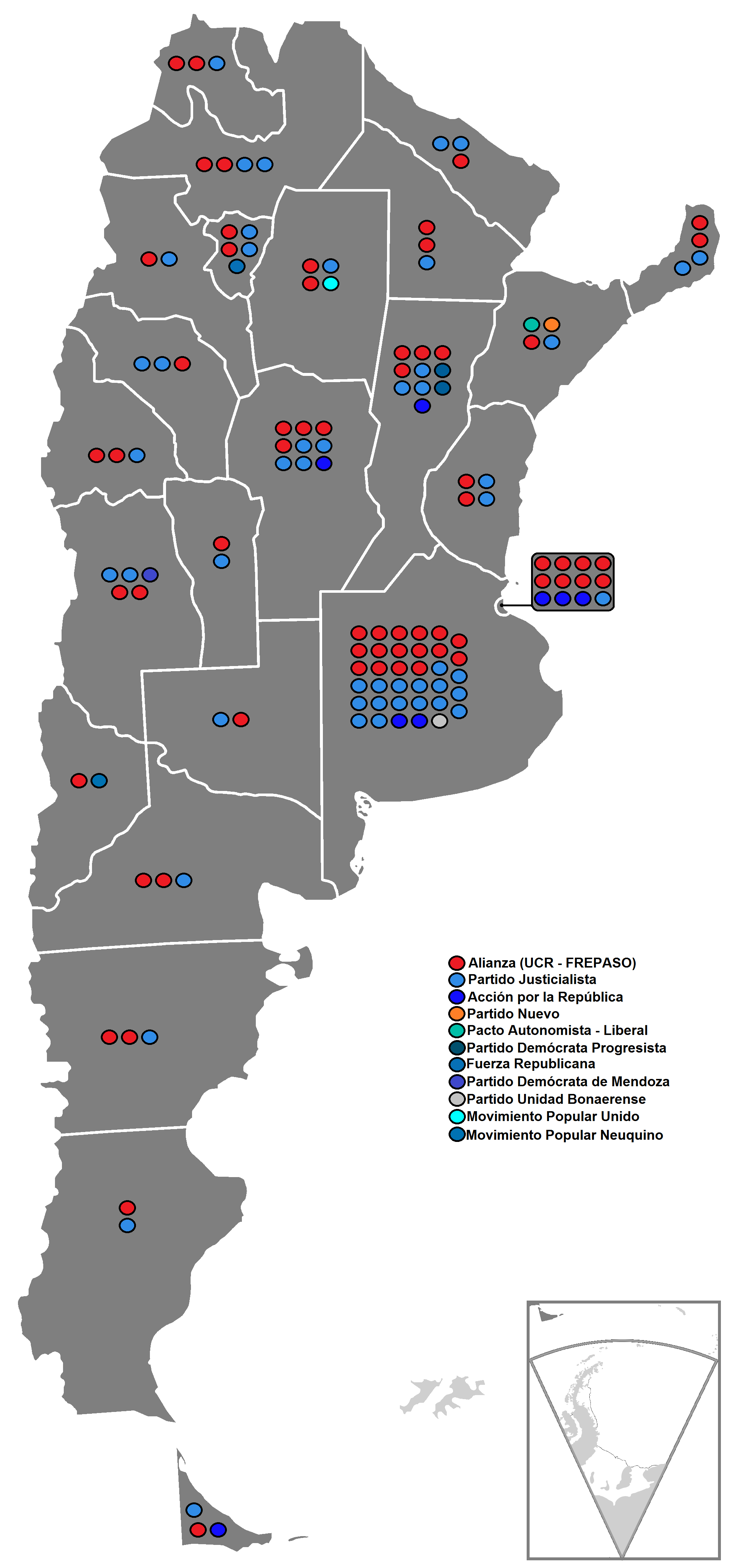
Results by province

General elections were held in Argentina in 1999; the president was elected on 24 October 1999 while legislative elections were held on four dates, 8 August, 12 September, 26 September and 24 October, though most polls took place on 24 October.

== Background ==
The Convertibility Plan, which had helped bring about stable prices and economic recovery and modernization, had endured the 1995 Mexican peso crisis, the 1997 Asian financial crisis, and other global shocks; but not without strain. Argentine business confidence struggled following these events and unemployment, already higher as a result of a wave of imports and sharp gains in productivity after 1990, had hovered around 15% since 1995. Economic problems also led to a sudden increase in crime, particularly property crime, and President Carlos Menem's unpopularity had left his Justicialist Party (whose populist Peronist platform he had largely abandoned) weakened.

Having himself experienced the burdens of an economy in crisis, former president and centrist Radical Civic Union (UCR) leader Raúl Alfonsín negotiated the Alliance for Work, Justice and Education between the center-left FREPASO, who had finished second in the 1995 general elections, and his own UCR party. The Alliance had great electoral success in the 1997 midterm elections winning a majority of congressional seats up for election preventing the Justicialist Party from obtaining a legislative majority, though they retained a legislative plurality. Following their initial victory, the party geared for the 1999 elections by nominating Buenos Aires Mayor Fernando de la Rúa for president and FREPASO leader Carlos 'Chacho' Álvarez as his running mate. De la Rúa had overwhelmingly won the party's 1998 presidential primaries. Álvarez, a former Peronist who had broken ranks with his party following Menem's turn to the right in 1989, remained the country's most prominent center-left figure following FREPASO's defeat in 1995. He also provided an ideological counterbalance to De la Rúa, a moderately conservative UCR figure who had himself, in 1973, previously been the running mate on a UCR ticket defeated by Juan Perón.

The Justicialist Party was badly positioned as the economy re-entered recession in late 1998. President Menem had only worsened its image by flirting with seeking an unprecedented third straight term, though this was barred by the Argentine Constitution. Unable to persuade Congress to approve these plans, he pledged to run again in 2003, stating that "if I had been permitted to run, I am sure I would have won." His dismissal of de la Rúa as "boring" moreover was effectively used by the Alliance campaign in their ads, by which de la Rúa's tedium became a desirable alternative to Menem's "party" (a reference to the outgoing administration's numerous corruption scandals).

Broadsides like these only further undermined his party's nominee, Buenos Aires Province Governor Eduardo Duhalde, who as a more traditional Peronist, had been distanced from the President since being elected governor in 1991. Duhalde's own approval suffered, however, as crime rates in the Greater Buenos Aires area (home to 2/3 of his constituents) rose steadily. This weakness was highlighted by the Ramallo massacre, a botched police intervention of a bank robbery on September 17 in which members of the force were implicated. An imposing figure in his party despite his diminutive height, Duhalde could only agree on a marginal figure in the party as his running mate: pop musician and former Tucumán Province Governor Ramón Ortega.

Domingo Cavallo, the economist behind the "Argentine miracle" of the early 1990s, had become unpopular during the 1995 recession. He was acrimoniously dismissed by the President in 1996 following his public allegations of influential "mafias" in Menem's entourage. His statements gained validity, however, following the 1997 murder of a news magazine photojournalist targeted by a shipping magnate close to Menem. Cavallo founded the Action for the Republic, and thus became a further obstacle to Duhalde, who would now lose a large share of the Menem vote to the unpredictable economist.

The recession, which had begun to ease on the eve of the October 24 election date, remained a central campaign issue. De la Rúa, who had earned plaudits for his fiscal discipline while mayor of Buenos Aires, stressed the need to crack down on graft and corruption. Besides referring to Menem himself, he pointed to the presence of exiled Paraguayan strongman General Lino Oviedo (who had been allowed in as a fugitive by Menem) as a poster child of the prevailing state of the rule of law. Duhalde focused on promises to combat the recession and double-digit unemployment. An anticipated runoff election was ultimately not needed, since the Alliance obtained 48% of the total vote - winning on the first round by 10% over Duhalde. Cavallo received only 10%, and much of the remainder went to left-wing parties (in contrast to 1995, when the far-right gained top minor-party status).

The 1999 legislative elections renewed about half of the Chamber of Deputies (130 seats); there were no elections to the Senate. The Alliance obtained 63 seats, the Justicialist Party 51, and Domingo Cavallo's Action for the Republic 7. This left the Justicialists in the minority in the Lower House for the first time since 1989.

== Candidates for President ==
- Justicialist Party (populist): Governor Eduardo Duhalde of Buenos Aires Province.
- Alliance for Work, Justice and Education (social democrat): Chief of Government Fernando De la Rúa of the City of Buenos Aires.
- Action for the Republic (conservative liberal): Deputy Domingo Cavallo of the City of Buenos Aires.

== Results ==
=== President ===
Candidate	Running mate	Party or alliance		Votes	%
Fernando de la Rúa	Carlos Álvarez	De la Rúa – Álvarez	Alliance for Work, Justice and Education	8,788,834	46.37
Fernando de la Rúa	Carlos Álvarez	De la Rúa – Álvarez	Democratic Progressive Party	297,129	1.57
Fernando de la Rúa	Carlos Álvarez	De la Rúa – Álvarez	Autonomist–Liberal–PDP	81,257	0.43
Fernando de la Rúa	Carlos Álvarez	De la Rúa – Álvarez	Total	9,167,220	48.37
Eduardo Duhalde	Palito Ortega	Duhalde – Ortega	Justicialist Consensus	6,466,867	34.12
Eduardo Duhalde	Palito Ortega	Duhalde – Ortega	Union of the Democratic Centre	562,674	2.97
Eduardo Duhalde	Palito Ortega	Duhalde – Ortega	Federal Integration Front	79,749	0.42
Eduardo Duhalde	Palito Ortega	Duhalde – Ortega	Justicialist Party	69,397	0.37
Eduardo Duhalde	Palito Ortega	Duhalde – Ortega	United Popular Movement	50,082	0.26
Eduardo Duhalde	Palito Ortega	Duhalde – Ortega	Front of Hope	18,089	0.10
Eduardo Duhalde	Palito Ortega	Duhalde – Ortega	Federal Party	7,044	0.04
Eduardo Duhalde	Palito Ortega	Duhalde – Ortega	Total	7,253,902	38.27
Domingo Cavallo	Armando Caro Figueroa	Cavallo – Caro Figueroa	Action for the Republic	1,859,995	9.81
Domingo Cavallo	Armando Caro Figueroa	Cavallo – Caro Figueroa	Union of the Democratic Centre of Santa Fe	77,549	0.41
Domingo Cavallo	Armando Caro Figueroa	Cavallo – Caro Figueroa	Total	1,937,544	10.22
Patricia Walsh	Rogelio de Leonardi	United Left		151,977	0.80
Lía Méndez	Jorge Pompei	Humanist Party		131,811	0.70
Jorge Altamira	Pablo Rieznik	Workers' Party		113,916	0.60
Jorge Emilio Reyna	Néstor Gabriel Moccia	Resistance Front		57,133	0.30
Juan Ricardo Mussa	Irene Fernanda Herrera	Social Christian Alliance		53,143	0.28
José Alberto Montes	Oscar Hernández	Socialist Workers' Party		43,911	0.23
Domingo Camilo Quarracino	Amelia Rearte	Authentic Socialist Party		43,147	0.23
Total				18,953,704	100.00
Valid votes				18,953,704	95.49
Invalid votes				186,761	0.94
Blank votes				708,876	3.57
Total votes				19,849,341	100.00
Registered voters/turnout				24,111,270	82.32
Source: DINE, Ministry of the Interior

=== Chamber of Deputies ===
Party	Votes	%	Seats	
Party	Votes	%	Won	Total
Alliance for Work, Justice and Education	8,497,076	45.89	66	131
Justicialist Consensus for Change	7,153,786	38.63	51	103
Action for the Republic	1,502,732	8.12	9	12
Buenos Aires Unity Party	289,860	1.57	1	1
Democratic Party	235,357	1.27	1	3
Humanist Party	144,712	0.78	0	0
United Left	150,493	0.81	0	0
Workers' Party	110,576	0.60	0	0
Republican Force	99,572	0.54	1	3
Neuquén People's Movement	89,798	0.48	1	2
Authentic Socialist Party	46,001	0.25	0	0
Resistance Front	42,388	0.23	0	0
Socialist Workers' Party	35,977	0.19	0	0
Unity and Liberty Party	23,471	0.13	0	0
Union for the Future	20,670	0.11	0	0
Neighborhood Unity Movement	12,545	0.07	0	0
Renewal Party	11,404	0.06	0	0
Social Christian Alliance	6,711	0.04	0	0
New Alliance	6,595	0.04	0	0
New Liberal Alternative Party	5,655	0.03	0	0
Party of the City	5,573	0.03	0	0
Río Gallegos Neighborhood Movement for Santa Cruz	4,836	0.03	0	0
Fuegian People's Movement	4,562	0.02	0	1
Educational Party	3,463	0.02	0	0
Chaco Action	3,185	0.02	0	0
Third Epoch Party	2,921	0.02	0	0
Fuegian Action Front	2,084	0.01	0	0
Salta Solidarity Party	1,603	0.01	0	0
Independence Party	1,540	0.01	0	0
Solidarity Movement	1,432	0.01	0	0
Emancipatory Front	292	0.00	0	0
Development and Justice Party			–	1
Total	18,516,870	100.00	130	257
Valid votes	18,516,870	93.37		
Invalid votes	192,862	0.97		
Blank votes	1,122,980	5.66		
Total votes	19,832,712	100.00		
Registered voters/turnout	24,107,414	82.27		
Source: DINE, Ministry of the Interior

==== Results by province ====
Province	Alianza			Justicialist Consensus			AR			Others		
Province	Votes	%	Seats	Votes	%	Seats	Votes	%	Seats	Votes	%	Seats
Buenos Aires	3,080,133	43.30	16	2,984,898	41.97	16	511,465	7.19	2	536,175	7.54	1
Buenos Aires City	1,029,340	52.39	8	439,199	22.35	1	348,814	17.75	3	147,570	7.51	—
Catamarca	82,086	53.94	1	66,570	43.74	1	—	—	—	3,537	2.32	—
Chaco	255,096	58.60	2	172,846	39.71	1	—	—	—	7,351	1.69	—
Chubut	105,017	60.74	2	64,346	37.21	1	—	—	—	3,544	2.05	—
Córdoba	761,728	45.74	4	675,203	40.55	4	170,215	10.22	1	58,111	3.49	—
Corrientes	192,175	45.43	2	203,569	48.12	2	22,562	5.33	—	4,696	1.11	—
Entre Ríos	315,659	49.94	2	289,117	45.74	2	21,655	3.43	—	5,626	0.89	—
Formosa	91,791	48.65	1	95,743	50.74	2	—	—	—	1,150	0.61	—
Jujuy	116,369	49.32	2	107,762	45.67	1	7,513	3.18	—	4,289	1.82	—
La Pampa	79,260	47.63	1	79,601	47.84	1	5,468	3.29	—	2,073	1.25	—
La Rioja	38,860	31.02	1	86,412	68.98	2	—	—	—	—	—	—
Mendoza	302,244	38.27	2	175,164	22.18	1	66,812	8.46	1	245,531	31.09	1
Misiones	189,938	45.68	2	224,029	53.87	2	—	—	—	1,874	0.45	—
Neuquén	74,671	36.31	1	33,327	16.21	—	—	—	—	97,623	47.48	1
Río Negro	136,121	57.32	2	60,961	25.67	1	34,205	14.40	—	6,188	2.61	—
Salta	200,697	44.94	2	210,723	47.18	2	20,044	4.49	—	15,151	3.39	—
San Juan	159,254	51.92	2	99,521	32.44	1	45,013	14.67	—	2,950	0.96	—
San Luis	73,276	44.62	1	67,490	41.09	1	—	—	—	23,471	14.29	—
Santa Cruz	37,561	45.85	1	37,334	45.58	1	—	—	—	7,020	8.57	—
Santa Fe	865,846	52.32	6	547,004	33.05	3	194,644	11.76	1	47,468	2.87	—
Santiago del Estero	115,652	34.35	2	189,627	56.33	2	8,776	2.61	—	22,597	6.71	—
Tierra del Fuego	10,112	25.76	1	9,658	24.60	1	11,484	29.26	1	8,000	20.38	—
Tucumán	184,190	32.70	2	233,682	41.49	2	34,062	6.05	—	111,281	19.76	1
Total	8,497,076	45.89	66	7,153,786	38.63	51	1,502,732	8.12	9	1,363,276	7.36	4

=== Governors ===
Provincial elections were held in every province except Corrientes. Elections for Mayor of the City of Buenos Aires were held the following May. The Justicialist Party increased their majority among governors by one, to 15; outgoing Vice President Carlos Ruckauf was elected Governor of Buenos Aires Province, the nation's largest. The UCR retained 6, mainly in the Alliance (all but 3 Alliance candidates, in turn, were from the UCR). The Justicialists wrested governorships from the UCR (Córdoba), from the MPF in Tierra del Fuego (which endorsed the Justicialists), and from the far-right Republican Force (Tucumán); the UCR, in turn, displaced the Justicialists in Entre Ríos, Mendoza, and San Juan.

District	Elected Governor	Party	%	Runner-up	Party	%
Buenos Aires	Carlos Ruckauf	Justicialist	48.3	Graciela Fernández Meijide	FREPASO (Alliance)	41.4
Catamarca	Oscar Castillo	Civic Social Front (UCR)	52.6	Ramón Saadi	United for Catamarca	44.7
Chaco	Ángel Rozas ^{R}	Front for All	63.4	Jorge Capitanich	Union for a New Chaco	35.9
Chubut	José Lizurume	UCR (Alliance)	52.0	Marcelo Guinle	Justicialist	46.1
City of Buenos Aires^{1}	Aníbal Ibarra	FREPASO (Alliance)	49.3	Domingo Cavallo	Encounter for the City	33.2
Córdoba^{2}	José Manuel de la Sota	Justicialist	49.6	Ramón Mestre ^{L}	UCR	40.5
Entre Ríos	Sergio Montiel	UCR (Alliance)	49.1	Héctor Maya	All for Entre Ríos	47.5
Formosa	Gildo Insfrán ^{R}	Justicialist	73.7	Gabriel Hernández	UCR (Alliance)	26.1
Jujuy	Eduardo Fellner ^{R}	Justicialist	50.6	Gerardo Morales	UCR (Alliance)	49.4
La Pampa	Rubén Marín ^{R}	Justicialist	56.7	Juan Carlos Passo	UCR (Alliance)	39.8
La Rioja	Ángel Maza ^{R}	Justicialist	68.6	José Luis Bellia	UCR (Alliance)	29.5
Mendoza	Roberto Iglesias	UCR (Alliance)	37.9	Carlos Balter	Democratic	32.2
Misiones	Carlos Rovira ^{R}	Front for Change	53.7	Ricardo Barrios Arrechea	UCR (Alliance)	45.8
Neuquén	Jorge Sobisch	Neuquén People's Movement	44.2	Oscar Massei	FREPASO (Alliance)	36.7
Río Negro	Pablo Verani ^{R}	UCR (Alliance)	48.6	Remo Costanzo	Union for Río Negro	41.7
Salta	Juan Carlos Romero ^{R}	Justicialist	58.5	Ricardo Gómez Diez	UCR (Alliance)	40.2
San Juan	Alfredo Avelín	UCR (Alliance)	55.7	Jorge Escobar ^{L}	Justicialist	42.3
San Luis	Adolfo Rodríguez Saá ^{R}	Justicialist	54.3	Walter Ceballos	UCR (Alliance)	45.0
Santa Cruz	Néstor Kirchner ^{R}	Justicialist	54.6	Anselmo Martínez	UCR (Alliance)	44.3
Santa Fe	Carlos Reutemann	Justicialist	57.6	Horacio Usandizaga	UCR (Alliance)	41.4
Santiago del Estero	Carlos Juárez ^{R}	Justicialist	52.2	Héctor Ruiz	New Alliance	26.3
Tierra del Fuego	Carlos Manfredotti	Justicialist	50.9	Jorge Colazo	UCR (Alliance)	49.1
Tucumán	Julio Miranda	Justicialist	36.5	Ricardo Bussi	Republican Force	35.8
1: Election held 7 May 2000. The City of Buenos Aires is not a province but an autonomous federal territory. The head of the local Executive is referred to as "Government Chief." 2: Election held 20 December 1998. R: Reelected. L: Incumbent lost.

== See also ==
- Politics of Argentina
- List of political parties in Argentina
