= 1991 Argentine legislative election =

- 11 August – 1 December 1991
- 130 of the 257 seats in the Chamber of Deputies
- Turnout: 80.41%
Party	Vote %	Seats	+/–
Justicialist Party	40.81	63	+3
Radical Civic Union	28.87	43	−9
Union of the Democratic Centre	6.24	5	0
Socialist–Intransigent–Humanist	5.63	3	+2
Movement for Dignity and Independence	3.45	3	New
Independent Federalist Confederation	3.12	3	+2
Republican Force	1.80	2	New
Autonomist–Liberal–PDP	1.06	2	0
Democratic Progressive Party	0.85	1	0
Neuquén People's Movement	0.51	1	0
Renewal Crusade	0.49	1	+1
Blockist Alliance	0.47	1	0
Fuegian People's Movement	0.06	2	New
This lists parties that won seats. See the complete results below.
Results by province

Legislative elections were held in Argentina on 11 August, 8 September, 27 October and 1 December 1991, with most of the voting taking place on 8 September. Voters chose their legislators and governors with a turnout of 80%.

== Background ==
Amid sudden hyperinflation and riots, Governor Carlos Menem exhorted voters in May 1989 that "following me will not disappoint you!" Elected in a landslide, his administration had a rocky start marked by an early stabilization plan that had failed by December and a series of corruption scandals surrounding his freewheeling in-laws. After a tentative stability had been achieved by the end of 1990, a new currency crisis in January 1991 led President Menem to transfer his Foreign Minister, Domingo Cavallo, to the Economics Ministry. Cavallo, an unorthodox economist remembered for having rescinded the Central Bank's hated Circular 1050 and its crushing interest rate surcharges during a stint as Central Bank President in 1982, was entrusted to bring stability to Argentina's shredded currency, the austral, and to begin the repair of Argentina's nearly non-existent relations with its foreign creditors (owed arrears on billions of debt since 1988) and the country's own sizable upper class (who held well over US$50 billion in assets abroad).

Backed partly by a then-record US$8 billion trade surplus in 1990 and partly by the assumption that Menem's free-market policies would encourage a wave of foreign direct investment, Cavallo's Convertibility Plan tied the Argentine currency to the U.S. dollar, leading a sharp drop in local interest rates and to a recovery in local deposits, lending and the depressed economy soon after the plan's March 27, 1991, introduction. Currency stability led particularly to lower inflation, which fell from 1,350% in 1990 to 84% in 1991; prices rose 1.3% in the month of August (the best showing since 1974) and the hitherto unpopular Menem saw his approval soar. Menem's turn against time-honored Justicialist Party tenets such as the support of labor laws and the encouragement of State enterprises (policies defined in the 1940s by the party's very founder, Juan Perón), led some in his party to run on splinter Peronist tickets, which did well - but came far from seriously challenging the official party ticket.

Menem's contentious divorce from his wife of 25 years, Zulema Yoma, reports of massive corruption surrounding his in-laws and the resignation under indictment of his Public Works Minister and privatizations guru, Roberto Dromi, could not overshadow the improving economic climate among the electorate at large. The Justicialist Party's victory in the 1991 mid-term elections was not so much absolute as it was relative: the party made no inroads into their large majorities in the Argentine Chamber of Deputies or among the nation's governors; indeed, they lost 3 of their 17 governors elected in 1987. They did, however, increase their difference over the UCR, whose leader, former President Raúl Alfonsín, resigned amid scorn over the shadow his chaotic 1983–89 tenure seemed to cast over these polls. The UCR, in two upsets, wrested governorships in Catamarca and Chubut Provinces, however. The paramount Buenos Aires Province gave Vice-President Eduardo Duhalde a 2-to-1 victory over the UCR's gray eminence, former Economy Minister Juan Carlos Pugliese; in the Greater Buenos Aires area, on the other hand, one-time mutineer Col. Aldo Rico was able to translate voters' anger in the over rising illegal immigration and crime rates into an unexpected 3 seats in Congress for his far-right MODIN. These elections helped consolidate the scandal-plagued Menem's tenuous grasp on the presidency, making them (in his words) "the day Menemism was born."

== Results ==
Party	Votes	%	Seats	
Party	Votes	%	Won	Total
Justicialist Party	6,418,226	40.81	63	130
Radical Civic Union	4,539,967	28.87	43	85
Union of the Democratic Centre	981,611	6.24	5	12
Socialist–Intransigent–Humanist	885,057	5.63	3	3
Movement for Dignity and Independence	543,375	3.45	3	3
Independent Federalist Confederation	490,099	3.12	3	6
United Left	341,864	2.17	0	1
Republican Force	282,478	1.80	2	4
Autonomist–Liberal–Democratic Progressive	167,276	1.06	2	3
Popular Action for Liberation	138,529	0.88	0	0
Democratic Progressive Party	133,188	0.85	1	2
Democratic Party	100,101	0.64	0	1
Neuquén People's Movement	80,648	0.51	1	2
Renewal Crusade	77,425	0.49	1	2
Blockist Alliance	74,603	0.47	1	1
Workers' Party	59,731	0.38	0	0
Christian Democratic Party	58,830	0.37	0	0
Labor and People's Party	60,232	0.38	0	0
Authentic Formosa Party	30,351	0.19	0	0
Integration and Development Movement	26,552	0.17	0	0
Independent Call	24,089	0.15	0	0
Neighborhood Party	23,075	0.15	0	0
Constitutional Nationalist Party	22,073	0.14	0	0
Popular Union	17,947	0.11	0	0
Corrientes Action	14,089	0.09	0	0
Renewal Party of the Province	13,362	0.08	0	0
Chubut Action Party	11,572	0.07	0	0
Río Negro Provincial Party	11,444	0.07	0	0
Popular Action Movement	11,163	0.07	0	0
Fuegian People's Movement	9,704	0.06	2	2
Patriotic Liberation Movement	7,211	0.05	0	0
Democratic Party of the City of Buenos Aires	6,375	0.04	0	0
Santa Cruz Popular Movement	6,270	0.04	0	0
Three Flags Renewal Party	6,059	0.04	0	0
Call for the Reunion	4,654	0.03	0	0
Buenos Aires Popular Movement	4,237	0.03	0	0
Democratic Movement of Participation	4,178	0.03	0	0
Republican Social Party	3,919	0.02	0	0
Labor Party of Tucumán	3,651	0.02	0	0
Center Party	3,587	0.02	0	0
White Party of Retirees	3,191	0.02	0	0
Popular Action	2,940	0.02	0	0
Social Justice	2,868	0.02	0	0
Formosa Action - Formosa Integrative Force	2,596	0.02	0	0
Middle Generation Party	2,493	0.02	0	0
Provincial Action Front	2,158	0.01	0	0
Liberal Democratic Party	2,019	0.01	0	0
Labor and Solidarity Front	1,776	0.01	0	0
Pampa Federalist Movement	1,572	0.01	0	0
Free Homeland	1,285	0.01	0	0
Autonomist Party	1,121	0.01	0	0
Provincial Popular Movement	1,061	0.01	0	0
Change and Justice	952	0.01	0	0
Provincial Defence–White Flag	656	0.00	0	0
Independence Party	630	0.00	0	0
Loyalty and Social Justice	605	0.00	0	0
Open Call for the Bases	469	0.00	0	0
Three Flags Party	454	0.00	0	0
People's Democracy - Social Front	149	0.00	0	0
Nationalist Movement	104	0.00	0	0
Total	15,727,901	100.00	130	257
Valid votes	15,727,901	94.24		
Invalid votes	127,323	0.76		
Blank votes	834,407	5.00		
Total votes	16,689,631	100.00		
Registered voters/turnout	20,817,039	80.17		
Source: Ministry of the Interior, DINE
