= 1994 Argentine Constitutional Assembly election =

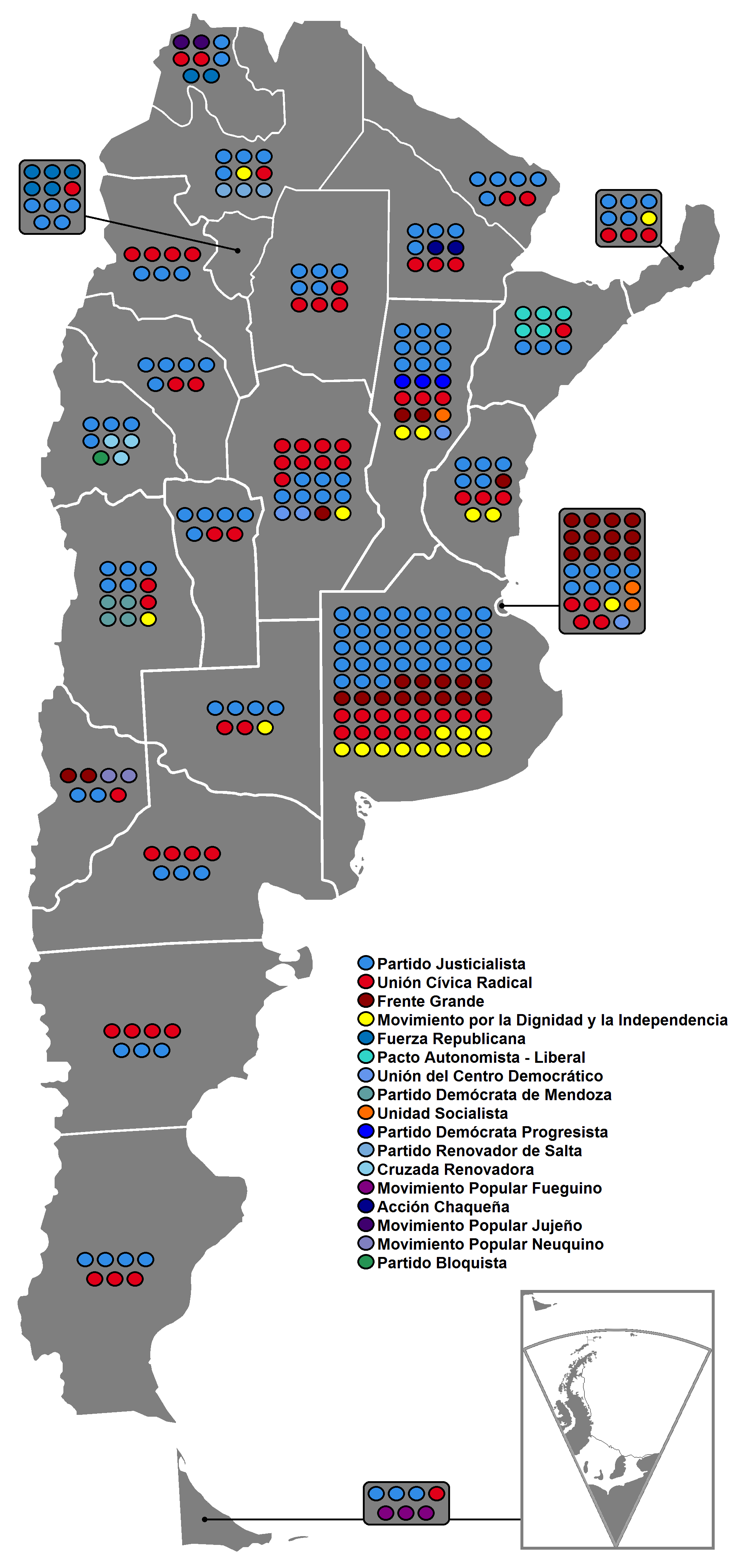
Results by province

Constitutional Assembly elections were held in Argentina on 10 April 1994. The Justicialist Party won the most seats, but failed to win a majority. The Constitutional Assembly amended the Constitution later that year.

== Results ==
Party or alliance		Votes	%	Seats
Justicialist Party	Justicialist Front	3,955,061	25.08	77
Justicialist Party	Justicialist Party	1,699,595	10.78	45
Justicialist Party	Front for Victory	322,733	2.05	12
Justicialist Party	Front of Hope	94,946	0.60	3
Justicialist Party	Total	6,072,335	38.50	137
Radical Civic Union	Radical Civic Union	2,940,346	18.64	64
Radical Civic Union	Radical Civic Union – Alliance for Patagonia	84,239	0.53	4
Radical Civic Union	Civic and Social Front of Catamarca	54,694	0.35	4
Radical Civic Union	Front for San Luis	34,887	0.22	2
Radical Civic Union	Total	3,114,166	19.74	74
Broad Front		2,082,622	13.20	31
Movement for Dignity and Independence		1,461,451	9.27	21
Socialist Unity	Socialist Unity	353,568	2.24	2
Socialist Unity	Honesty, Work and Efficiency Alliance	111,731	0.71	1
Socialist Unity	Popular Socialist Party	23,758	0.15	0
Socialist Unity	Democratic Socialist Party	2,556	0.02	0
Socialist Unity	Total	491,613	3.12	3
Union of the Democratic Centre	Union of the Democratic Centre	237,014	1.50	3
Union of the Democratic Centre	Center Alliance	115,340	0.73	0
Union of the Democratic Centre	Liberal Center Alliance	113,617	0.72	1
Union of the Democratic Centre	Total	465,971	2.95	4
Republican Force		277,808	1.76	7
Democratic Progressive Party		254,584	1.61	3
Democratic Party of Mendoza		217,631	1.38	4
Autonomist–Liberal Party		187,030	1.19	5
Alliance for No		158,604	1.01	0
Salta Renewal Party		93,429	0.59	3
Independent Christian Movement		85,182	0.54	0
Socialist Left Front		77,721	0.49	0
Renewal Crusade		74,968	0.48	3
Chaco Action		67,613	0.43	2
Christian Democratic Party		65,469	0.42	0
Jujuy People's Movement		56,813	0.36	2
Solidarity		55,340	0.35	0
Retirees Target Party		52,651	0.33	0
Neuquén People's Movement		47,023	0.30	2
Blockist Party of San Juan		33,486	0.21	1
Movimiento al Socialismo		31,003	0.20	0
Integration and Development Movement		27,312	0.17	0
Workers' Party		21,490	0.14	0
Workers' Socialist Movement		19,579	0.12	0
Independent Reformist Movement		17,579	0.11	0
Participation Socialist Party		17,517	0.11	0
Intransigent Party		14,664	0.09	0
Patagonian People's Movement		14,321	0.09	0
Constitutional Nationalist Party		13,270	0.08	0
Fueguian People's Movement		10,481	0.07	3
New Option Alliance		10,435	0.07	0
Independent Call		10,140	0.06	0
Socialist Workers' Party		10,080	0.06	0
Chubut Action Party		9,658	0.06	0
Order and Justice		6,965	0.04	0
Patriotic Liberation Movement		5,694	0.04	0
Catamarca Unit		5,583	0.04	0
Federal Party		5,559	0.04	0
New Party of Tucumán		5,543	0.04	0
Communist Party		4,537	0.03	0
Popular Democracy for the Social Front		3,461	0.02	0
Civic Action Movement		3,070	0.02	0
Regional Movement		2,880	0.02	0
Front of Hope (Catamarca)		2,724	0.02	0
Hope Movement		2,502	0.02	0
Autonomist Party of Salta		2,251	0.01	0
Humanist Party		508	0.00	0
Pacifist Ecologist Green Party – Green Future		25	0.00	0
Alliance and Memory		2	0.00	0
Total		15,772,343	100.00	305
Valid votes		15,772,343	94.00	
Invalid votes		224,163	1.34	
Blank votes		782,477	4.66	
Total votes		16,778,983	100.00	
Registered voters/turnout		21,644,991	77.52	
Source: Ministry of the Interior, DINE
