= 2005 Argentine legislative election =

- 23 October 2005
- Chamber of Deputies
- 127 of the 257 seats in the Chamber of Deputies
- Turnout: 73.33%
Party	Vote %	Seats	+/–
Front for Victory	39.46	63	−5
Radical Civic Union	10.24	14	−3
Federal Peronism	8.09	12	+11
Support for an Egalitarian Republic	8.00	9	−1
Republican Proposal Alliance	7.44	10	+6
Socialist Party–Radical Civic Union	5.18	7	0
Federalist Unity Party	2.29	2	−1
New Front	2.02	3	0
Frente de Todos	1.63	3	0
Salta Renewal Party	0.58	1	0
Neuquén People's Movement	0.50	2	0
Civic Front for Victory (PJ + UCR)	0.36	1	0
This lists parties that won seats. See the complete results below.
- Senate
- 24 of the 72 seats in the Senate
- Turnout: 76.41%
Party	Vote %	Seats	+/–
Front for Victory	47.70	16	+3
Federal Peronism	19.51	5	
Radical Civic Union	9.10	3	−3
This lists parties that won seats. See the complete results below.

Legislative elections were held in Argentina on Sunday, 23 October 2005. The 23 provinces and the Autonomous City of Buenos Aires were used as electoral districts. Each district elected a number of members of the Lower House (the Argentine Chamber of Deputies) roughly proportional to their population. Eight districts (Buenos Aires, Formosa, Jujuy, La Rioja, Misiones, San Juan, San Luis, and Santa Cruz) also elected members to the Upper House of Congress (the Argentine Senate); as usual, three senators were elected (two for the majority, one for the first minority).

In most provinces, the national elections were conducted in parallel with local ones, whereby a number of municipalities elected legislative officials (concejales) and in some cases also a mayor (or the equivalent executive post). Each provincial election followed local regulations.

A number of districts had held primary elections beforehand. In most cases, primary elections are optional and can be called for by the local political parties as needed; in Santa Fe, however, the primaries were universal and compulsory due to a recent law that repealed the much-criticized Ley de Lemas.

== Background ==
The main parties and coalitions competing in these elections were:

- President Kirchner's faction of Peronism, called Frente para la Victoria (FV, "Front for Victory") and its allies.
- Other factions of Peronism, under the usual name Partido Justicialista (PJ, "Justicialist Party"), often led by their respective provincial party leaders (notably Eduardo Duhalde in Buenos Aires Province).
- Unión Cívica Radical (UCR, "Radical Civic Union").
- Afirmación Para Una República Igualitaria (ARI, "Support for an Egalitarian Republic"), led by Elisa Carrió.
- Recrear para el Crecimiento (Recreate for Growth, usually shortened to Recrear) and its allies within the Propuesta Republicana (Republican Proposal, PRO) front.
- Partido Socialista (PS, Socialist Party).

In some districts, different factions of the Justicialist Party (PJ) presented candidates separately. In Buenos Aires Province and the city of Buenos Aires, the main intra-party division of the PJ was between the center-right, traditional Peronist faction led by Hilda González de Duhalde (wife of former governor and interim president Eduardo Duhalde), and the more center-left "heterodox" faction with candidates that answer to President Néstor Kirchner. These included his own wife, Cristina Fernández de Kirchner, and Minister of Foreign Relations, Rafael Bielsa. In the Province of Buenos Aires, this split was protested by other parties, on the grounds that the PJ (taken as a whole) would most likely win the three senatorial benches available (as it finally occurred).

Kirchner took a prominent role in the campaign for "his" candidates of the Front for Victory (Frente para la Victoria, FV) in most provinces, explicitly stating that these elections were a referendum on his administration. Kirchner also campaigned against former President Carlos Menem, a leading conservative Peronist, in La Rioja Province, where the latter was ultimately elected to the Senate for the third (minority party) seat. The opening and closing campaign meetings of the FV were both held in Rosario, a typically progressive city that, since 1987, had been governed successfully by a Socialist local government. This party changed the traditional electoral paradigm in the Province of Santa Fe, largely displacing Peronism and the UCR in that district.

== Results ==
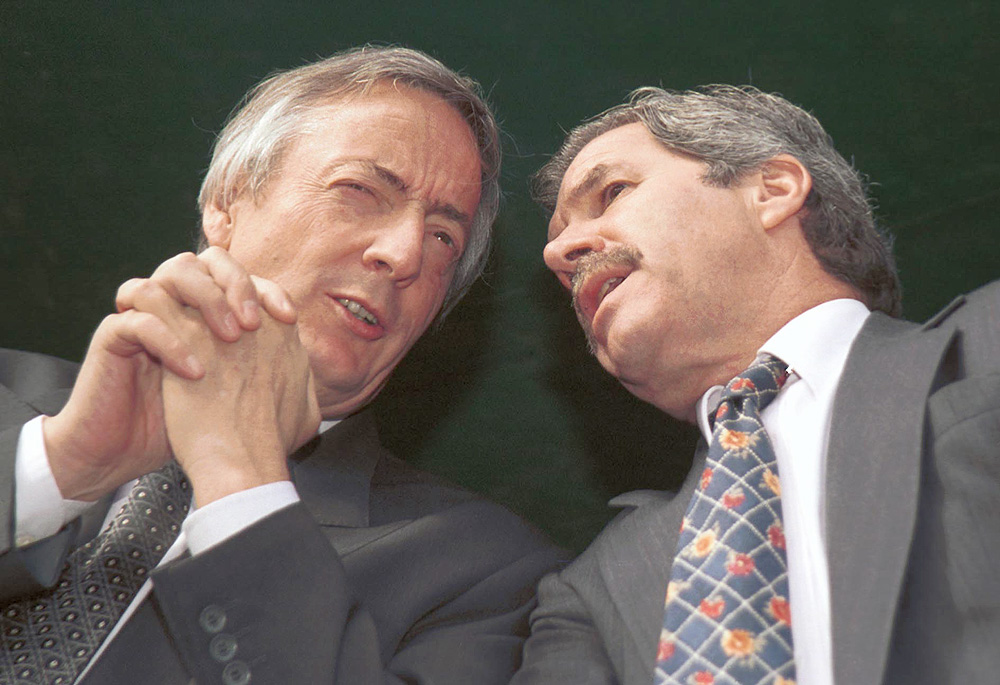
President Néstor Kirchner (left) confers with Buenos Aires Province Governor Felipe Solá. Their opposition to powerbroker Eduardo Duhalde dominated the 2005 races.

Buoyed by a strong recovery in the Argentine economy, candidates endorsed by Kirchner (mainly on the Front for Victory ticket) obtained an overwhelming triumph. Of the 127 deputies elected, the FV won 69 seats (54%); the UCR only got 19. The rest of the Justicialist Party obtained 11 seats; Recrear got 9, the ARI got 8, and the Socialist Party got 5. Only the three most voted in this list have an established national structure; Recrear and the ARI are relatively recent offshoots of the UCR (to the right- and left-wing side of the political spectrum, respectively), and the Socialist Party's five deputies all belong to the province of Santa Fe, the only district where the PS is strong.

As explained above, eight provinces were also scheduled to renew their senators (the Senate is renewed by thirds every two years). The Front for Victory won 17 of the 24 senatorial seats. The other factions of Peronism got 4 senators. The UCR got the remaining 3 seats. Among the remarkable results were the victory of First Lady Cristina Fernández de Kirchner in Buenos Aires, the largest in the country, beating former First Lady Hilda González de Duhalde by about 25% of the votes; and the defeat of Carlos Menem in his home district, La Rioja (though he won the first minority seat).

=== Chamber of Deputies ===
Party	Votes	%	Seats	
Party	Votes	%	Won	Total
Front for Victory	6,806,891	39.46	63	110
Radical Civic Union	1,765,951	10.24	14	35
Federal Peronism	1,395,014	8.09	12	38
Support for an Egalitarian Republic	1,380,330	8.00	9	19
Republican Proposal Alliance	1,282,503	7.44	10	14
Socialist Party–Radical Civic Union (Note: 4 seats for Socialist Party and 3 seats for Radical Civic Union)	893,115	5.18	7	7
Federalist Unity Party	395,102	2.29	2	5
United Left	366,259	2.12	0	0
New Front	349,112	2.02	3	6
Frente de Todos (Note: 2 seats for Justicialist Party-Front for Victory and 1 seat for Radical Civic Union)	281,077	1.63	3	3
Humanist Party	233,889	1.36	0	0
Workers' Party	224,868	1.30	0	0
Socialist Party	144,734	0.84	0	3
Neighborhood Confederation	134,531	0.78	0	0
Salta Renewal Party	100,686	0.58	1	2
Neuquén People's Movement	86,610	0.50	2	4
Movimiento al Socialismo–Socialist Workers' Party	78,320	0.45	0	0
Self-determination and Freedom	63,320	0.37	0	2
Civic Front for Victory (PJ + UCR) (Note: 1 seat for Justicialist Party–Front for Victory)	62,262	0.36	1	1
Front for Justice and Social Progress	61,803	0.36	0	0
Authentic Socialist Party	60,992	0.35	0	0
United for Corrientes Front	60,642	0.35	0	1
People's Reconstruction Party	54,430	0.32	0	0
United People's Front	50,302	0.29	0	0
Democratic Progressive Party	48,731	0.28	0	0
People First – Neighborhood Union of Córdoba	46,277	0.27	0	0
Republican Force	40,982	0.24	0	2
Anticorruption Front	40,922	0.24	0	0
Union for Everyone	40,630	0.24	0	0
Everyone – Political Movement for the Defence of Civil and Social Rights	36,536	0.21	0	0
Christian Democratic Party	34,234	0.20	0	0
Centre Federal Movement	33,713	0.20	0	0
Integration and Development Movement	32,030	0.19	0	0
Popular Union	30,405	0.18	0	0
Intransigent Party	28,528	0.17	0	0
Open Politics for Social Integrity	28,405	0.16	0	0
Chubut Action Party	26,773	0.16	0	0
Popular Action Movement	26,002	0.15	0	0
Unity and Liberty Party	24,224	0.14	0	0
Corrientes Project	23,907	0.14	0	1
Socialist Convergence	22,095	0.13	0	0
Provincial Neighborhood Movement	20,737	0.12	0	0
Blocist Unity	19,866	0.12	0	0
Movement for Dignity and Independence	19,448	0.11	0	0
Independent Movement of Retirees and Unemployed	19,025	0.11	0	0
Popular Loyalty	16,897	0.10	0	0
Federal Democratic Alliance	13,991	0.08	0	0
Front Party	13,944	0.08	0	0
Authentic Popular Front	11,542	0.07	0	4
Front for the New Majority	11,069	0.06	0	0
Freedom and Responsible Democracy	10,979	0.06	0	0
Río Negro Provincial Party	10,675	0.06	0	0
Fuegian People's Movement	9,447	0.05	0	0
Porteña Hope	9,269	0.05	0	0
Santiado del Estero Crusade	9,224	0.05	0	0
Constitutional Nationalist Party	8,751	0.05	0	0
Party for Independent Solidarity Action in Buenos Aires	8,742	0.05	0	0
Network for Buenos Aires	8,548	0.05	0	0
Citizen Dignity	7,367	0.04	0	0
Popular Sovereignty Front	7,069	0.04	0	0
Together for Mendoza	6,954	0.04	0	0
San Luis Front of Victory	6,818	0.04	0	0
Front of Self-Convened Political Groups	6,656	0.04	0	0
Service and Community	6,479	0.04	0	0
Independent Citizens	6,218	0.04	0	0
Front Unity for Change	5,810	0.03	0	0
Retirees in Action	5,700	0.03	0	0
Salta Popular Movement	5,153	0.03	0	0
Popular Unity Movement	4,950	0.03	0	0
May 25 Party	4,508	0.03	0	0
Republican Union	3,895	0.02	0	0
Popular Unity	3,727	0.02	0	0
Citizen Action	3,386	0.02	0	0
People's Assemblies Party	3,361	0.02	0	0
New Generation	3,361	0.02	0	0
Autonomist Party	3,344	0.02	0	0
Emancipatory Front	3,140	0.02	0	0
Popular Participation Party	3,107	0.02	0	0
Public Call	2,885	0.02	0	0
Free in Motion	2,700	0.02	0	0
New Leadership	2,489	0.01	0	0
Open Space	2,193	0.01	0	0
Fuegian Federal Party	1,993	0.01	0	0
United Neighbors	1,949	0.01	0	0
Provincial Defence–White Flag	1,569	0.01	0	0
Third Millennium	1,542	0.01	0	0
Independent Party of Chubut	1,392	0.01	0	0
Independence Party	1,386	0.01	0	0
Transformative Action	1,382	0.01	0	0
Middle Generation Party	1,359	0.01	0	0
Autonomous Power	1,261	0.01	0	0
Provincial Action	975	0.01	0	0
Conservative People's Party	877	0.01	0	0
New Party of Buenos Aires	792	0.00	0	0
Federal Renewal Party	597	0.00	0	0
Citizen Integration Call	557	0.00	0	0
Total	17,248,192	100.00	127	257
Valid votes	17,248,192	89.98		
Invalid votes	454,007	2.37		
Blank votes	1,466,367	7.65		
Total votes	19,168,566	100.00		
Registered voters/turnout	26,140,766	73.33		

=== Senate ===
Party	Votes	%	Seats	
Party	Votes	%	Won	Total
Front for Victory	3,938,766	47.70	16	41
Federal Peronism	1,611,214	19.51	5	5
Radical Civic Union	751,112	9.10	3	18
Support for an Egalitarian Republic	575,263	6.97	0	0
Republican Proposal Alliance	509,756	6.17	0	0
United Left	188,782	2.29	0	0
Neighborhood Confederation	137,634	1.67	0	0
Humanist Party	116,314	1.41	0	0
Workers' Party	108,420	1.31	0	0
Movimiento al Socialismo–Socialist Workers' Party	42,619	0.52	0	0
Socialist Party	38,468	0.47	0	1
Popular Action Movement	29,785	0.36	0	0
People's Reconstruction Party	27,820	0.34	0	0
Blocist Unity	22,243	0.27	0	0
Socialist Convergence	21,860	0.26	0	0
Popular Front	20,418	0.25	0	0
Independent Movement of Retirees and Unemployed	18,595	0.23	0	0
Integration and Development Movement	14,196	0.17	0	0
Front for the New Majority	12,587	0.15	0	0
Authentic Popular Front	11,445	0.14	0	0
Freedom and Responsible Democracy	10,854	0.13	0	0
Party for Independent Solidarity Action in Buenos Aires	8,743	0.11	0	0
Citizen Dignity	8,637	0.10	0	0
San Luis Front of Victory	7,276	0.09	0	0
Unity for Change Front	5,877	0.07	0	0
May 25 Party	4,932	0.06	0	0
Popular Unity	3,191	0.04	0	0
Free in Motion	2,706	0.03	0	0
New Leadership	2,467	0.03	0	0
New Generation	2,362	0.03	0	0
Unity and Liberty Party	1,924	0.02	0	0
Movement for Dignity and Independence	666	0.01	0	0
Neuquén People's Movement			–	2
Republican Force			–	2
Salta Renewal Party			–	1
New Party			–	1
New Front			–	1
Total	8,256,932	100.00	24	72
Valid votes	8,256,932	89.40		
Invalid votes	150,189	1.63		
Blank votes	828,944	8.98		
Total votes	9,236,065	100.00		
Registered voters/turnout	12,088,122	76.41		
