= El Tribuno =

- Type: Daily newspaper
- Format: tabloid
- Owner: Horizontes S.A
- Publisher: Juan Carlos Romero
- Founded: 1949
- Political alignment: Peronism
- Headquarters: Salta, Argentina
- Circulation: 12,400
- Website: www.eltribuno.com

El Tribuno is an Argentine newspaper and media group from Salta Province. Widely criticized for its pro-Peronist tilt, it is the only newspaper in Salta Province, and also publishes a Jujuy Province edition.

Founded by Jaime and Ricardo Durán, its initial installations had belonged to La Provincia, the leading daily in Salta for much of the early 20th century. Released on August 21, 1949, El Tribuno was allied to Peronism, and provided a political counterpart to the UCR-leaning El Cívico Intransigente. Following President Perón's 1955 ouster, the paper was shuttered by the new regime, and sold at auction in 1957 to a consortium led by a local lawyer, Roberto Romero. Romero modernized the newspaper, which became one of the first to incorporate offset printing, in 1967. Romero left the post as publisher following his election as governor of Salta in 1983.

Following the elder Romero's death in 1992, his son, Juan Carlos, became its publisher. His tenure at its helm has been marked by the conspicuous omission of news unfavorable to local Peronist interests, particularly the Romeros'. These have included scandals, as well as failing to publish the results of the 2003 general elections, in which the Menem/Romero ticket narrowly won the first round, but was forced to withdraw when polls predicted a landslide for left-wing Peronist Néstor Kirchner.
