= Commitment to Change =

Former political party in Argentina

Commitment to Change Compromiso para el Cambio
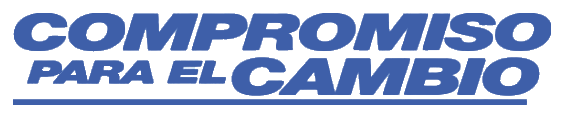
- Leader: Mauricio Macri
- President: Mauricio Macri
- Vice President: Horacio Rodríguez Larreta
- Founded: 2 April 2003
- Dissolved: 1 April 2008
- Merged into: Republican Proposal
- Headquarters: Buenos Aires
- Ideology: Conservatism
- Political position: Centre-right
- Regional affiliation: Union of Latin American Parties
- Colours: Blue

Commitment to Change (Spanish: Compromiso para el Cambio) was a centre-right political party in Argentina, principally active in the City of Buenos Aires.

== History ==
The party was led by Mauricio Macri, businessman and chairman of Boca Juniors football club. The party was conceived as a source for new politicians, as the major parties were discredited after the December 2001 riots in Argentina. It has been active since he stood to be Mayor of Buenos Aires in 2003. He won the first round but lost the runoff election with 47% of the popular vote to Aníbal Ibarra. The party did however win a large number of members of the city legislature.

In 2003 Commitment to Change also won five seats in the Argentine Chamber of Deputies, the lower house of the Argentine Congress. In 2005 the party teamed up with the centre-right party of Ricardo López Murphy, Recreate for Growth, principally active in Buenos Aires Province. The new alliance was named Republican Proposal or usually PRO. The front won nine deputies in the 2005 legislative elections. Macri became a deputy in 2005.

Ahead of the 2007 elections, Macri and López Murphy have been in discussions with Jorge Sobisch, governor of Neuquén Province and likely presidential candidate in 2007, to create a nationwide centre-right political force. López Murphy has fallen out with Sobisch. Macri withdrew his support to Sobisch after the scandal of the death of the teacher Fuentealba during a demonstration in Neuquen.

On 2 April 2008, Commitment to Change replaced its name to Republican Proposal. A year later, Recreate for Growth was absorbed by Republican Proposal.
