= Roberto Ulloa =

Argentinian politician (1924–2020)

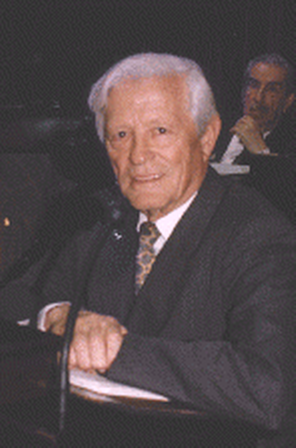
- Ulloa in 1995

National Senator
- In office July 3, 1996 – December 10, 2003
- Constituency: Salta

Governor of Salta Province
- In office December 10, 1991 – December 10, 1995
- Vice Governor: Ricardo Gómez Diez
- Preceded by: Hernán Hipólito Cornejo
- Succeeded by: Juan Carlos Romero

National Deputy
- In office December 10, 1985 – December 10, 1991
- Succeeded by: Ernesto Salim Alabi
- Constituency: Salta

Governor of Salta Province (Military de Facto)
- In office April 19, 1977 – February 22, 1983
- Vice Governor: Vacant
- Preceded by: Héctor Damián Gadea (de facto)
- Succeeded by: Edgardo Plaza (de facto)

Personal details
- Born: March 1, 1924 Pigüé, Argentina
- Died: December 8, 2020 (aged 96) Buenos Aires, Argentina
- Party: Salta Renewal Party(1982-2007); Propuesta Salteña (2007-2020)
- Children: Roberto Ulloa, Álvaro Ulloa, Rita Ulloa, Gloria Ulloa, Rocío Ulloa

Roberto Augusto Ulloa (March 1, 1924 – December 8, 2020) was an Argentine politician and captain in the Argentine Navy. He was a Governor of Salta Province for two tenures: 1977 to 1983 (de facto) and 1991 to 1995. He was the founder and leader of the Salta Renewal Party, a regional conservative party based in Salta Province.

Ulloa died in Buenos Aires on December 8, 2020, at the age of 96.
