= Democratic Party of the City of Buenos Aires =

Democratic Party Partido Demócrata
- President: Mónica Alonso de Fait
- Vicepresident: Eduardo Santamarina
- Secretary General: Paula Scauzillo
- Founded: July 31, 1931
- Preceded by: National Democratic Party
- Headquarters: Rodríguez Peña 525, Buenos Aires, Argentina
- Youth wing: Juventud del Partido Demócrata
- Ideology: Conservatism
- Political position: Centre-right
- National affiliation: Democratic Party; La Libertad Avanza (currently)
- Colours: Blue
- Seats in the Buenos Aires City Legislature: 0 / 60

Website
- http://partidodemocrata.com.ar/

The Democratic Party of the City of Buenos Aires (Spanish: Partido Demócrata de la Ciudad de Buenos Aires) is a provincial conservative political party in Buenos Aires City, Argentina. It was founded around 1930.

It was member of the national Recreate for Growth electoral alliance led by Ricardo López Murphy.

It supports Mauricio Macri in Buenos Aires since 2003 and is an ally of Republican Proposal in this district. It is a sister party to the more successful Democratic Party in the province of Mendoza.

The Democratic Party recognizes as a reference the former provisional president of the Senate, Federico Pinedo.
