= Hernán Hipólito Cornejo =

Argentine diplomat and politician (1945–2024)

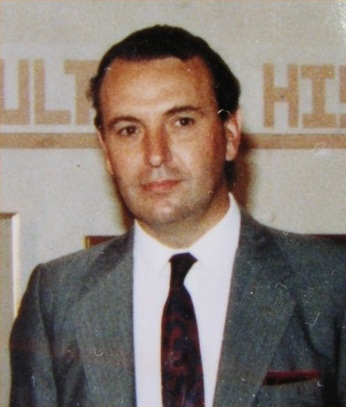

Member of the Mercosur Parliament for Salta Province
- In office 10 December 2015 – 10 December 2023

Governor of Salta Province
- In office 10 December 1987 – 10 December 1991
- Preceded by: Roberto Romero
- Succeeded by: Roberto Ulloa

Personal details
- Born: 22 July 1945; Salta, Salta Province, Argentina
- Died: 15 February 2024 (aged 78); Salta, Salta Province, Argentina
- Political party: PJ
- Occupation: Diplomat

Hernán Hipólito Cornejo (22 July 1945 – 15 February 2024) was an Argentine diplomat and politician. A member of the Justicialist Party, he served as Governor of Salta Province from 1987 to 1991 and was a member of the Mercosur Parliament from 2015 to 2023.

Cornejo died in Salta on 15 February 2024, at the age of 78.
