= Recreate for Growth =

Political party in Argentina

Recreate for Growth Recrear para el Crecimiento
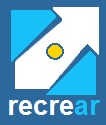
- Leader: Ricardo López Murphy
- President: Esteban Bullrich
- Vice President: Pablo Tonelli
- Founded: March 2002 (original); August 2020 (current)
- Dissolved: August 2009 (original); November 2020 (current)
- Split from: Radical Civic Union
- Merged into: Republican Proposal
- Headquarters: Buenos Aires, Argentina
- Ideology: Conservative liberalism
- Political position: Center-right
- National affiliation: Republican Proposal
- International affiliation: Liberal International (observer)
- Regional affiliation: Union of Latin American Parties (observer)
- Colours: Blue & white

Website
- recrear.com.ar

Recreate for Growth (Spanish: Recrear para el Crecimiento, often just Recrear) was a centre-right political party in Argentina, principally active in the Province of Buenos Aires.

It existed from 2002 to 2009 and again during 2020, from August to November.

== Ideology and principles ==
López Murphy defines Recrear as "simply liberal", a supporter of modern capitalism.

He maintains that he tried with Recrear "to have a serious liberal party, organized as in the advanced democracies of the world, which continues with the traditions of Juan Bautista Alberdi and Leandro Alem."

López Murphy was against gay marriage, decriminalization of drug use and abortion.

== History ==
The party was formed in March 2002, mostly by market-oriented members of the Radical Civic Union, headed by Ricardo López Murphy.

According to Página 12, a progressive newspaper, Recrear was a republican and honest right-wing and López Murphy's dream was to expand the historic ten percent that the Argentine right-wing reaches in elections.

The Recrear Federal Movement is a national alliance formed in 2003 between Recrear itself and the Federal Movement of various provincial parties – the Salta Renewal Party, the Democratic Progressive Party, the Democratic Party of Mendoza, the Federal Party, the Liberal Party of Corrientes, the Democratic Party of the City of Buenos Aires, the Democratic Liberal Party of Córdoba, the Catamarca Popular Movement, the Provincial Union of Entre Ríos, the Party of the Hope of the Province of Buenos Aires, the Independent Citizens of Tucumán and the Federal North of Jujuy. López Murphy as the movement's presidential candidate and Ricardo Gómez Diez of Salta for vice-president in the 2003 elections, ending in third place with 18%.

In 2005 the party formed an alliance with Buenos Aires' party Commitment to Change led by Mauricio Macri. The alliance has attempted to form a wide-ranging center-right front, especially with Neuquén's party, the Neuquino People's Movement (Movimiento Popular Neuquino - MPN), for the 2005 parliamentary elections. Recrear and its allies won nine members of the Argentine Chamber of Deputies, with those of some of Recrear's constituent provincial parties. López Murphy subsequently fell out with Jorge Sobisch, leader of the MPN, and formally teamed up with Commitment to Change to form a new centre-right electoral front, Republican Proposal (PRO).

Following the election, López Murphy stood down from the leadership of the Party and in 2008, Congressman Esteban Bullrich was elected to replace him. Bullrich backed the ongoing alliance with Macri and PRO, whilst López Murphy had backed Castor López, calling for the autonomy of the Party. In April 2008, López Murphy resigned from the Party and later set up another new party, Convergencia Federal which has pursued closer ties with the Civic Coalition.

In August 2009, the party was finally absorbed by the Republican Proposal.

Recrear had observer status within both the Liberal International, and the conservative Union of Latin American Parties.

In August 2020, more than a decade after Recrear was dissolved, López Murphy refounded the party for the 2021 Argentine legislative election. In November, Recrear, along with the Libertarian Party of Argentina, Mejorar, and Unidos, formed the Republicanos Unidos alliance. They have considered allying themselves with libertarian economist José Luis Espert for the legislative election.

== Electoral history ==
=== Presidential elections ===
Election year	Candidate(s)	First Round	Second Round	Result	Note		
# votes	% vote	# votes	% vote				
2003	Ricardo López Murphy	3.173.584	16.37%			✗ Defeated	as Recreate for Growth
2007	Ricardo López Murphy	273,015	1.43%			✗ Defeated	as Recreate for Growth

== See also ==
- Liberal parties by country
