= Luis Alberto Ammann =

Argentinian politician (1942–2020)

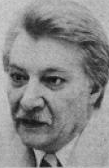
Amman in 1989

Luis Alberto Ammann (17 November 1942 – 6 November 2020) was an Argentine politician of the Humanist Party as well as journalist, schoolteacher and writer.

Amman was born in Villa Dolores, Córdoba Province. He ran for President of Argentina during the 2007 Argentine general election, obtaining 0.41% of the votes.

Amman obtained a degree in linguistics from the National University of Córdoba and a degree in philology from the University of La Laguna in Tenerife, Spain. As journalist, he was an editor of La Voz del Interior before entering politics. He founded the Humanist Party in 1984 and later affiliated, in 1987, with the Communist Party and the Green party.

He was candidate for president in 1989 Argentine general election, obtaining 0.26% of votes for the Green Humanist Party and later affiliated with Fernando "Pino" Solanas.

He died from heart failure as a complication of COVID-19 in Buenos Aires on 6 November 2020, at the age of 77, during the COVID-19 pandemic in Argentina.
