= Roberto Romero =

Argentine politician (1927–1992)

Governor of Salta Province
- In office 1983–1987
- Preceded by: Edgardo Plaza
- Succeeded by: Hernán Hipólito Cornejo

Personal details
- Born: October 22, 1927 Salta, Argentina
- Died: February 15, 1992 (aged 64) Rio de Janeiro, Brazil
- Party: Justicialist Party
- Profession: Newspaper owner

Roberto Romero (October 22, 1927 – February 15, 1992) was an Argentine Justicialist Party politician and businessman.

Romero was a founder of the provincial El Tribuno newspaper. He was elected as Governor of Salta Province, serving from 1983 to 1987, and completing numerous public works aimed at the province's growing tourist industry – notably the DELMI Stadium and the San Bernardo Hill Aerial tramway. He then stepped down to become a national deputy in the Argentine Chamber of Deputies for Salta Province. He stood for governor once again in 1991, but lost and retired that year from public life.

In February 1992, whilst on holiday with his family in Brazil, Romero was killed in an automobile accident. His son, Juan Carlos Romero, later also served as Governor of Salta.

In 2006 it came to light that the Drug Enforcement Administration of the United States had considered Romero the likely head of a major drug cartel.

Preceded by Edgardo Plaza	Governor of Salta; 1983–1987	Succeeded by Hernán Cornejo
