= Juan Carlos Romero (politician) =

Argentine lawyer and politician (born 1950)

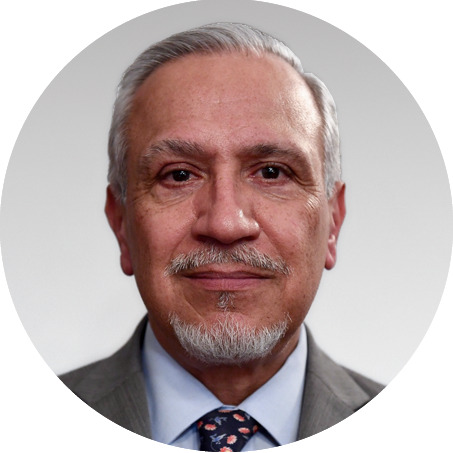
- Romero in 2019

National Senator
- Incumbent
- Assumed office 10 December 2007
- Constituency: Salta
- In office 10 December 1986 – 10 December 1995
- Constituency: Salta

Governor of Salta
- In office 1995–2007
- Lieutenant: Walter Wayar
- Preceded by: Roberto Ulloa
- Succeeded by: Juan Manuel Urtubey

Personal details
- Born: 16 November 1950 (age 75) Salta
- Party: Justicialist Party
- Profession: Lawyer

Juan Carlos Romero (born 16 November 1950) is an Argentine Justicialist Party politician and senator, and was Governor of Salta for 12 years. The former Peronist governor has accumulated political and economic power since 1995.

Romero was born in Salta where his father Roberto Romero was a politician, later governor of the province. He studied law and political science at the University of Buenos Aires. A lawyer, he became deputy editor, and then editor of the Salta newspaper founded by his father, El Tribuno, from 1974.

In 1986 Romero became a Senator for Salta Province. He took a leading role in economics and was re-elected in 1992. In 1995 he was elected governor of Salta and was re-elected in 1999 and 2003. He launched a bid for the presidency ahead of the 2003 general election, though he ran as Carlos Menem's running mate on the Peronist Front for Loyalty ticket. They narrowly won the first round, but poor polling numbers persuaded Menem and Romero to forfeit the runoff.

In 2007 he was again elected a Senator, with Juan Manuel Urtubey being elected governor of Salta. Romero was appointed vice-president of the Senate in December 2007. Although he had opposed Kirchnerism, he sat in the governing Front for Victory block in the Senate until 20 February 2009 when he announced that he and his fellow Salta Senator, Sonia Escudero, would be leaving the majority block.

Romero used to be married to Betina Marcuzzi and has four children. One of them, Bettina, currently serves as mayor of the City of Salta.

Political offices
Preceded by Roberto Ulloa	Governor of Salta; 1995–2007	Succeeded by Juan Manuel Urtubey
