= Isabel Viudes =

Argentine politician (born 1944)

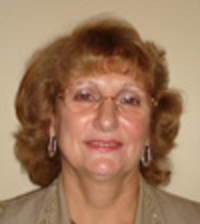

National Senator
- In office 15 March 2006 – 10 December 2009
- Constituency: Corrientes
- In office 10 December 2001 – 12 December 2001
- Constituency: Corrientes

Personal details
- Born: 11 May 1944 (age 81) Corrientes, Corrientes Province, Argentina
- Party: New Party of Corrientes; Front for Victory
- Spouse: Rodolfo Ernesto Damonte
- Profession: Lawyer

Isabel Josefa Viudes de Damonte (born 11 May 1944) is a former Argentine Senator for Corrientes Province. A former Peronist, she was a member of the New Party Corrientes (PANU), but was expelled in 2009 due to her support to the Argentine National Government in the farm tax hike issue.

Viudes qualified as a teacher then graduated as a lawyer from the National University of the Littoral. She was a judge in provincial courts.

A Peronist until 1997, Viudes served as a Corrientes city councillor between 1988 and 1991. She took part in the constitutional reform of Corrientes Province in 1993 and the national constitutional reform of 1994. She served as a provincial deputy from 1993 and became a provincial senator 1997 - 1999 after joining the New Party. She was first elected to the Senate in 2001 but resigned after just two days without swearing in, in favour of her reserve, former governor Raúl Romero Feris. She was appointed to the Senate in 2006 upon the resignation of Romero Feris who was unable to take his seat due to ongoing court proceedings, having been elected in his own right in 2003.

In the Senate, Viudes voted for the controversial Resolution 125 which had escalated the 2008 Argentine government conflict with the agricultural sector. Although the motion was defeated on the casting vote of Vice-President Julio Cobos, Viudes was expelled by the New Party which maintained its opposition to the national government. In February 2009, it was made known that she would be joining the ruling Front for Victory parliamentary group in the Senate and there was speculation that she would re-join the Justicialist Party. In 2009 she was appointed chairwoman of the Inner Security Committee, replacing Sonia Escudero. Her term expired on December 10, 2009.
