= Ricardo Gómez Diez =

Argentine politician (born 1949)

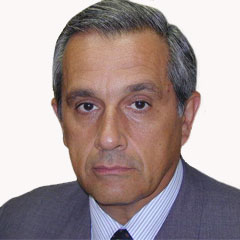
Ricardo Gómez Diez

Ricardo Gómez Diez (born March 4, 1949) is an Argentine politician. He was until 2007 a senator for Salta Province for the Salta Renewal Party (PRS) and was vice-presidential candidate of the national Recrear Federal Movement, now part of the PRO alliance. In 2009 he is a candidate for National Deputy for the Civic and Social Agreement alliance of Radicals and the Civic Coalition, amongst others.

Gómez Diez was born in Salta and studied at the Catholic University of Salta, becoming a lawyer. He became a member of the provincial legislature in 1984 and led the PRS block.

In 1991, Gómez Diez became Vice-Governor of Salta Province, serving until 1995. He was elected to the Argentine Chamber of Deputies in 1995, where he led the PRS block and sat until 2001, when he was elected a senator. At the 2003 Presidential election, Gómez Diez was candidate for Vice-President on the ticket of Ricardo López Murphy for Recrear. They came third in the first round.

Gómez Diez served as second Vice-President of the Senate and as a member of the Council of Magistracy of the Nation. His term expired in 2007 and his departure from the Senate came shortly after an acrimonious dispute within the PRS which saw his faction set up a new party, Salta Proposition. In May 2009 he was confirmed as a candidate for National Deputy for the Civic and Social Accord alliance, made up at a national level by the Radical Civic Union and Elisa Carrió's Civic Coalition, amongst others.

He is married to Inés Velarde and has three children.
