= Salta Renewal Party =

Salta Renewal Party Partido Renovador de Salta
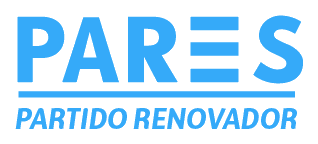
- Abbreviation: PaReS, PRS
- President: Cristina Fiore
- Founder: Roberto Ulloa
- Founded: October 23, 1982
- Headquarters: Salta, Argentina
- Youth wing: Juventud del Partido Renovador de Salta
- Ideology: Conservatism; Social conservatism
- Political position: Center-right
- National affiliation: Front for Victory (until 2015)
- Seats in the Chamber of Deputies of Salta: 5 / 38
- Seats in the Senate of Salta: 3 / 23

Website
- www.prssalta.com.ar

The Salta Renewal Party (Spanish: Partido Renovador de Salta; PRS) is a conservative provincial political party in Salta Province, Argentina.

The party is a federalist party, believing in strong and renewed provinces with power decentralised from Buenos Aires. It is a member of the national Recrear electoral alliance led by Ricardo López Murphy.

The party was founded in the 1980s as the country was preparing for a return to democracy. Salta had a tradition of local parties, but the Salta Popular Movement had declined in the 1970s and the national Radical Civic Union (UCR) was not a strong opponent in Salta of the ruling Justicialist Party. A group of activists formed the Party on October 30, 1983; it was named by Jorge Folloni.

In the first provincial elections after the dictatorship, held on October 30, 1983, the Salta Renewal Party received 52,000 votes and third place in the province, gaining 15 members of the provincial legislature. In 1991, Roberto Ulloa was elected governor of Salta for the party, with Víctor Montoya becoming mayor of the City of Salta on the same day. In the late 1990s the Party took part in the 'Alianza', the alliance principally between the UCR and FrePaSo which took Fernando de la Rúa to the presidency in 1999. With the collapse of de la Rúa's government in 2001, the alliance also split and in 2003, along with several other provincial parties, the Salta Renewal Party joined the Federal Movement of Recrear.

Until 2007, the Party had thirteen members of the Salta legislature, two deputies in the Argentine Chamber of Deputies and one senator in the Argentine Senate, Ricardo Gómez Diez, who contested the 2003 Argentine presidential elections as the running mate of López Murphy, coming third. In 2007, there was an acrimonious split in the PRS, with Gómez Diez losing the leadership by 48% to 52% to Andrés Zottos, then a national deputy. In a similar split as that faced by the other national and provincial parties, the party divided between those who supported the nation policies of Néstor Kirchner and those who opposed. Zottos and his supporters favoured the former position and entered into formal pacts with Kirchner's Front for Victory (FPV).

Zottos stood as the running mate to the FPV's Juan Manuel Urtubey in the contest for the governorship and was duly elected vice governor in 2007. Between them, the FPV list and the FPV-PRS list won all four national deputies. Gómez Díez helped set up a rival party, the Salta Proposition, but was largely wiped out electorally.

Since 2016, Cristina Fiore has been the party's president and leader.
