= Mario Losada (politician) =

Argentine politician

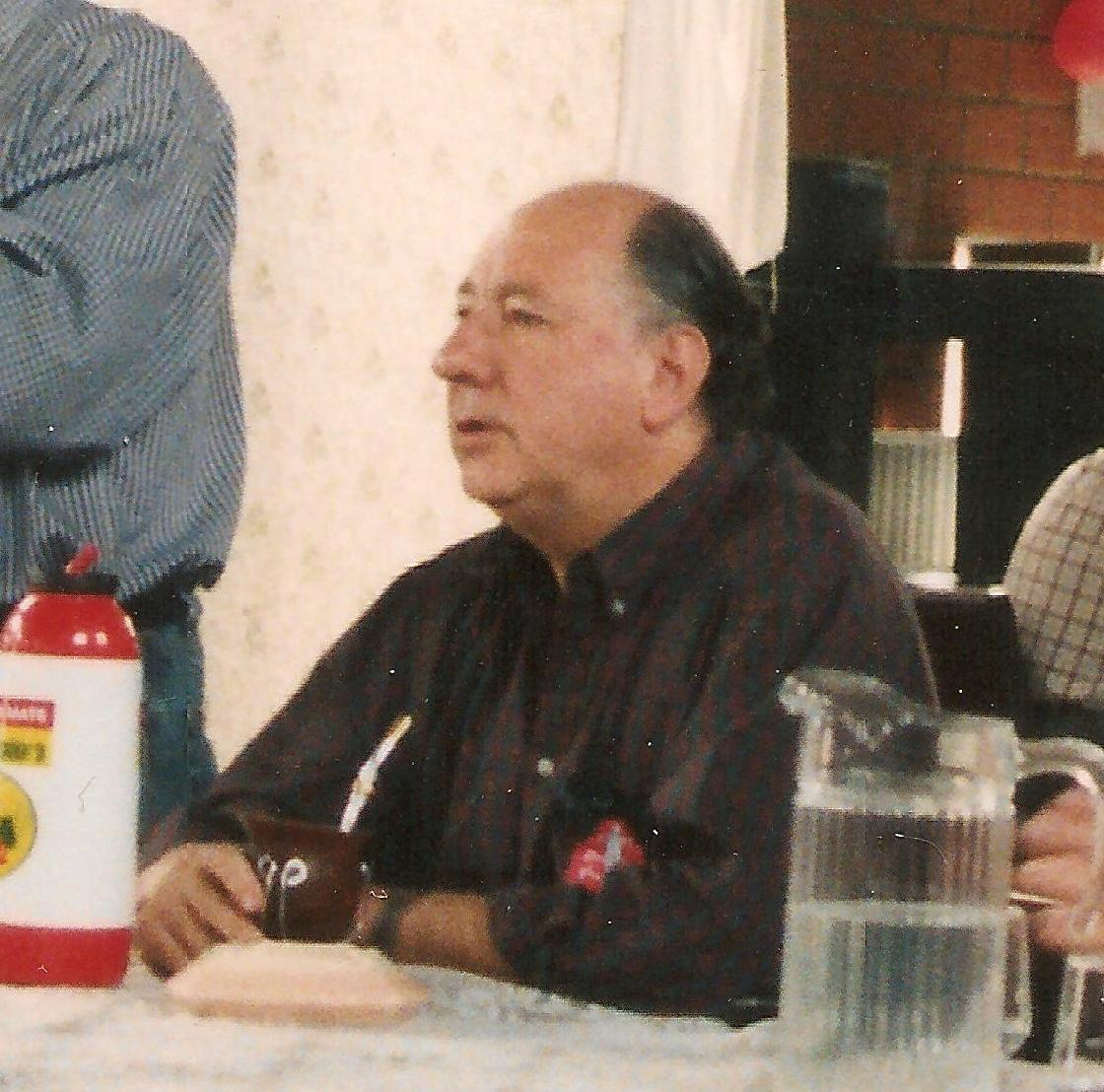
Mario Losada, 1997

Mario Losada (13 July 1938 – 27 June 2015) was an Argentine politician, who served as senator and president of the UCR.

== Biography ==
Born in Apóstoles, Mario Losada shares his name with his father, former governor of the Misiones province. He served as vice consul in Brazil during the term of office of his father. He also worked in Petrosur.

He ran for governor of Misiones, but lost to the Peronist, Julio César Humada. He was elected senator in the 1990s, and acted as president of the Radical Civic Union between 1991 and 1993. He ran for vice president in 2003, under the ticket of Leopoldo Moreau.

He died in Misiones on June 27, 2015, at the age of 76.
