= People's Reconstruction Party =

People's Reconstruction Party Partido Popular de la Reconstrucción
- Leader: Gustavo Breide Obeid
- Founded: 1996
- Dissolved: 2017
- Headquarters: Buenos Aires, Argentina
- Ideology: Argentine nationalism National Catholicism; Political Catholicism; Social conservatism
- Political position: Far-right

Website
- www.ppreconstruccion.com

The People's Reconstruction Party (PPR) was a political party of Argentina with a nationalist ideology. It was founded in 1996 by Gustavo Breide Obeid, Francisco Miguel Bosch and Enrique Graci Susini. Colonel Mohamed Alí Seineldín were also a leader of the group at one time.

Its national president was the licentiate in Political Science by the University J.F. Kennedy, and ex-Army captain Gustavo Breide Obeid.

Its youth organization was the National Youth of the PPR.

== Ideology ==
It defines itself as a party founded to "initiate a process of national reconstruction of salvation of the Argentine homeland". It opposes globalization and the new world order, fostering the restoration of what it calls the traditional values that enabled the birth of the nation, recovering social justice, political sovereignty and economic independence. Its ideological positioning is based on Catholic nationalism, expressed with the defense of what it considers "the fundamental pillars of the Argentine National Being (Argentinity): God, Homeland and Family". Because of the values it defends, it can also be considered an ideology close to conservatism and the extreme right. It defines itself as contrary to the neo-liberal economic system.

It affirms that it is necessary to give parliamentary treatment to the investigation of the external debt, and is in favor of suspending the payment until the investigation is finished. It opposes abortion because of its understanding that human life begins from conception. It emphasizes the values of masculinity and femininity and considers homosexuality as a "deviation", positioning itself against civil unions between people of the same sex.

It proposes the restoration of compulsory military service, the elevation of the retirement age to 70 years for men and the maintenance of religious education in primary and secondary schools.

== Electoral results ==
- Presidential elections 2007 – 45,318 votes (0.24%).
- Presidential elections 2003 – 42,460 votes (0.22%).
