= New Party (Corrientes) =

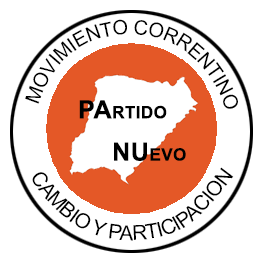
Logo of the New Party

The New Party (Spanish: Partido Nuevo, PANU) is a social-liberal political party in Corrientes Province, Argentina.

PANU's leading figure is former governor Raúl 'Tato' Romero Feris although its formal leader is Horacio Colombo. The party had one senator in the Argentine Senate, Isabel Viudes. However, she was expelled from the Party in 2008 for supporting the Government in a crucial Senate vote and has since announced she will be joining the ruling group.
