= Horacio Usandizaga =

Argentine politician (1940–2026)

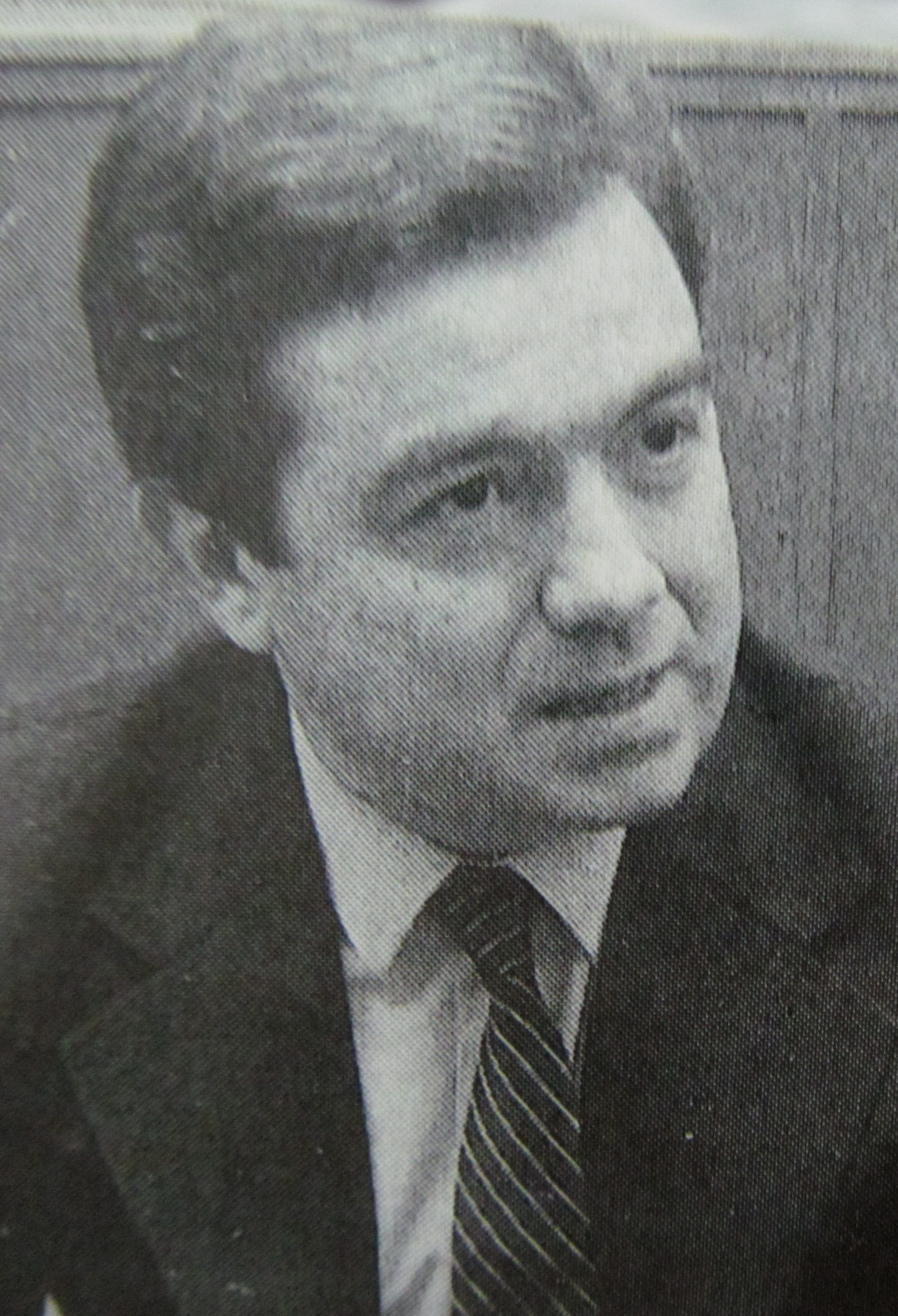
Usandizaga in 1986

Horacio Daniel Usandizaga (June 15, 1940 – January 4, 2026), also known informally as El Vasco (Spanish: The Basque), was an Argentine politician. He served as the first mayor of the city of Rosario following the restoration of democracy in the country in 1983.

== Life and career ==
Usandizaga was born in J.B. Molina, province of Santa Fe, Argentina on June 15, 1940. He studied to become a lawyer and entered political activity as a member of the Radical Civic Union (UCR) in 1961. He was first a councillor and then Mayor of Rosario from 11 December 1983 to 10 December 1987. He was re-elected for four more years but resigned and left office on 22 May 1989. A man of hot temper, Usandizaga had publicly promised that he would leave if Carlos Menem was elected president, as eventually happened. His term was completed by Héctor Cavallero, of the Socialist Party.

He stood as candidate for Governor of Santa Fe in 1991, 1995 and 1999, but on all three occasions he failed to win, in part due to the electoral system in place at the time (the now-repealed Ley de Lemas). He was elected as the provincial representative (Diputado) in the National Congress in 1993, and was a member of the Argentine Senate from 29 November 1995 to 9 December 2001. He was re-elected, but at the end of 2002 he announced he would retire from active politics upon the partial renewal of the Upper House on 9 December 2003.

In 2007, he was elected as president of Rosario Central, the club that he supported since childhood. He obtained 63% of the votes.

Usandizaga died from complications of multiple strokes on January 4, 2026, at the age of 85.

== Sources ==
- Intendentes de Rosario - Mayors of Rosario (in Spanish) on the website of the Municipality.
- List of Argentine Senators - historical records by province.

Preceded by Victor Cabanellas	Mayors of Rosario; 1983–1989	Succeeded by Héctor Cavallero
