= Authentic Socialist Party (Argentina) =

Political party in Argentina

Authentic Socialist Party Partido Socialista Auténtico
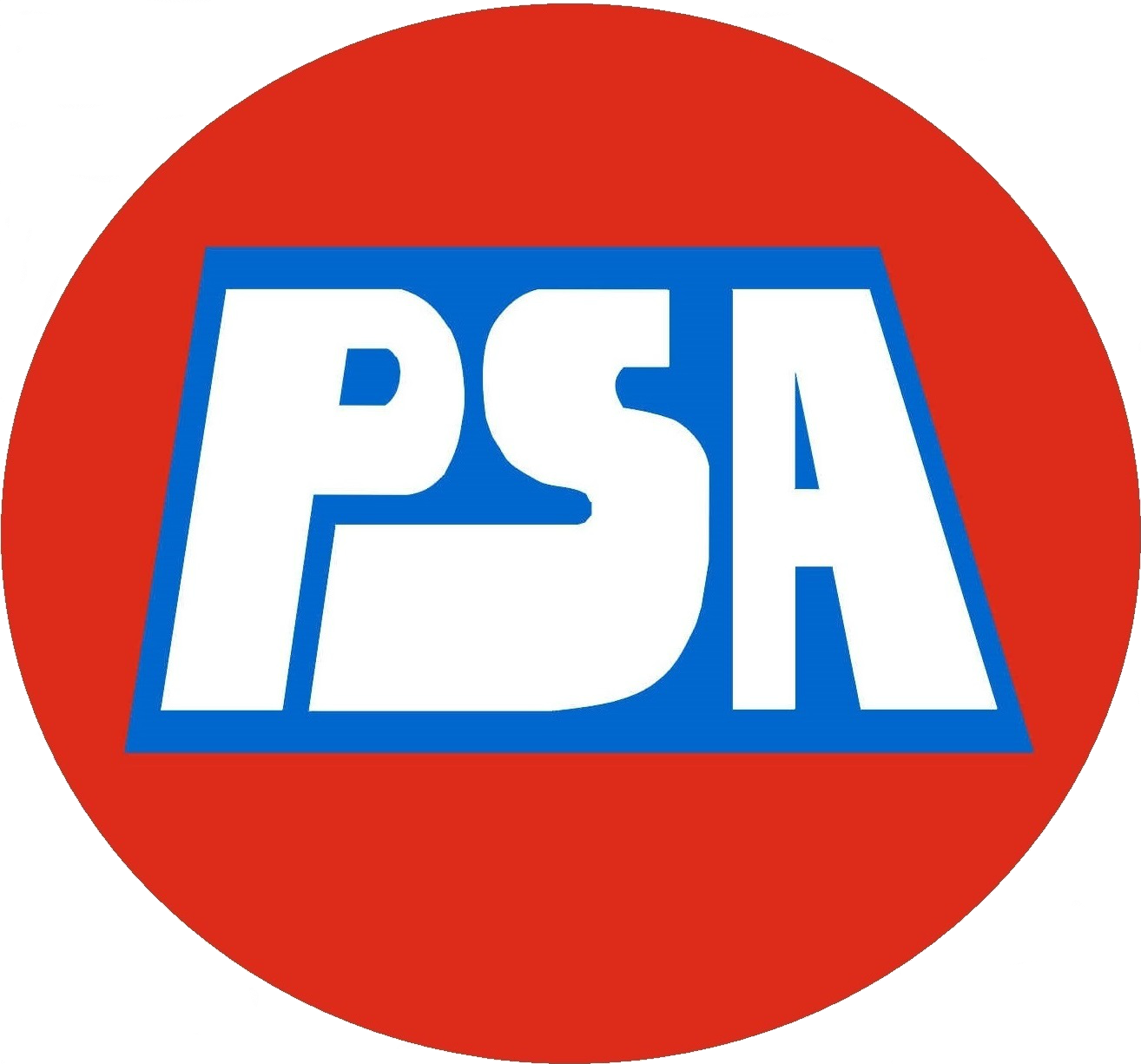
- Abbreviation: PSA
- General Secretary: Adrián Rodolfo Camps
- Founded: 14 December 1982; 43 years ago
- Split from: Popular Socialist Party
- Headquarters: Sarandí 56, Buenos Aires
- Membership (2016): 11,752
- Ideology: Democratic socialism Left-wing nationalism
- Political position: Left-wing
- National affiliation: Federal Consensus
- International affiliation: Sovintern

Website
- www.psa.org.ar

The Authentic Socialist Party (Spanish: Partido Socialista Auténtico; Welsh: Plaid Sosialaidd Dilys; PSA) is a minor socialist political party in Argentina.

Formed in the 1960s as a division of the Popular Socialist Party as the Argentine Socialist Party, it was forced to change its name in 1983 after the prohibition for political parties to have the terms National or Argentine in their names.

In 2002, the party refused to join the Popular Socialist Party and the Democratic Socialist Party in the reborn Socialist Party. In 2007, film director Fernando 'Pino' Solanas stood for the Party to be President of Argentina. The Party gained one deputy in the Argentine Chamber of Deputies, Claudio Lozano.
