= Unity and Liberty Party =

Argentine political party

Union and Liberty Party Partido Unión y Libertad
- Leader: Eduardo Gomina
- Headquarters: San Luis, Argentina
- Ideology: Peronism
- Colours: Yellow & Purple

The Union and Liberty Party (Spanish: Partido Unión y Libertad, PUL) is a political party in San Luis Province, Argentina. Independent of the Justicialist Party, it nevertheless defines itself as Peronist and supports the administration of dissident Peronist governor Alberto Rodríguez Saá with several leading PUL figures serving in the provincial government. Party leader Eduardo Gomina serves as provincial Minister of Environment.
