= Democratic Party (Mendoza) =

Democratic Party of Mendoza Partido Demócrata de Mendoza
- Abbreviation: PD
- President: Carlos Balter
- Founders: Emilio Civit, Benito Villanueva
- Founded: 1983
- Preceded by: National Democratic Party
- Headquarters: Sarmiento 667, Mendoza, Argentina
- Youth wing: Juventud del Partido Demócrata
- Ideology: Conservatism
- Political position: Right-wing
- National affiliation: Liberty Advances; National Democratic Party
- Colours: Blue
- Seats in the Chamber of Deputies of Mendoza: 2 / 48
- Seats in the Senate of Mendoza: 0 / 38

Website
- http://partidodemocrata.com.ar/

The Democratic Party is a provincial conservative and liberal party in Mendoza, Argentina. It was founded in 1983.

== History and principles ==
Since the end of the latest military regime in Argentina, the party has been the third political force in Mendoza, except in 1999 when it won the second position in the elections.

For many years it was led by former national deputy and candidate for governor of the province Carlos Balter.

In 2006, the president of the Democratic Party and national deputy, Omar De Marchi, asked "forgiveness" for the participation of leaders of this party during the last dictatorship.

The Democratic Party promised to strengthen the role of the party in Cambiemos, which governs the province with Alfredo Cornejo.

== History ==
It was member of the national Recrear electoral alliance led by Ricardo López Murphy although in 2007 it supported the presidential bid of Roberto Lavagna rather than that of López Murphy.

In the 2013 legislative elections, it formed a center-right alliance with the Republican Proposal, called the PD - PRO Union.

Since 2015, it has participated in an alliance with the Radical Civic Union and other parties in a centrist alliance called Frente Cambia Mendoza supporting the radical Alfredo Cornejo as governor of the Province, which finally managed to win the general elections.

With harsh criticism of the radical governor Rodolfo Suárez, the Democratic Party broke the agreement with the UCR and PRO and left Juntos por el Cambio.
