= Liberal Party of Corrientes =

Liberal party in Argentina

Liberal Party of Corrientes Partido Liberal de Corrientes
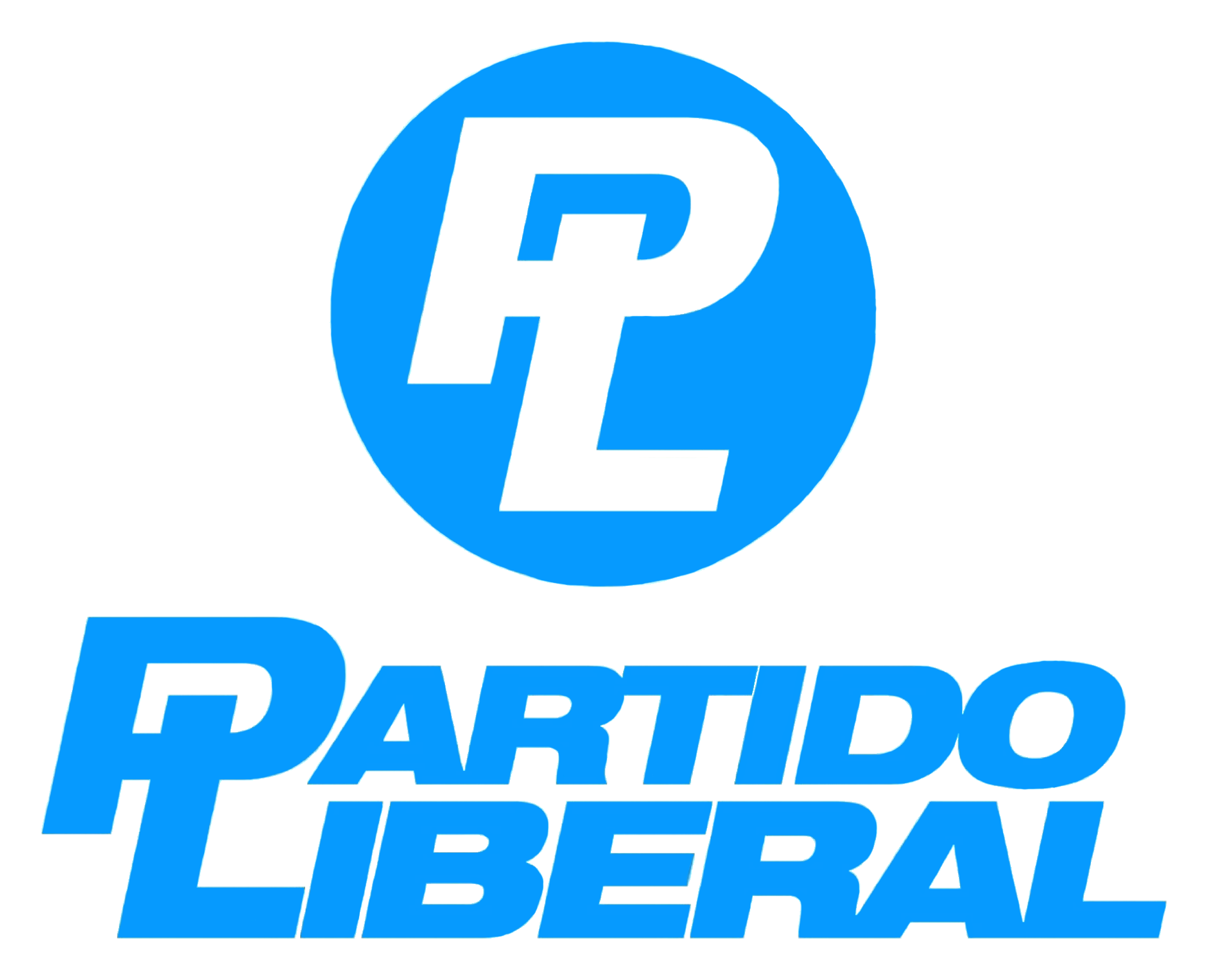
- Abbreviation: PL, PLC, PLCo
- President: Julián Miranda Gallino
- Founded: 15 December 1856
- Headquarters: La Rioja 924, Corrientes, Argentina
- Membership (2014): 70,755
- Ideology: Liberalism; Regionalism
- Political position: Centre
- Mayors in Corrientes: 3 / 72

The Liberal Party of Corrientes (Spanish: Partido Liberal de Corrientes) is a liberal provincial political party in Corrientes Province, Argentina. Founded in 1856, it is the oldest political party in Argentina still active.

The Party had its origins in the Federalist traditions of Corrientes and was founded on 15 December 1856 by Juan Eusebio Torrent. From its beginning, the party supported Bartolomé Mitre at the national level. José Pampín was elected Corrientes Governor in 1861, the first of 17 Liberal governors. Torrent was Mitre's vice-presidential candidate in 1874.

The Party's leading past figures include Juan Balestra, a government minister under Carlos Pellegrini, Raimundo Meabe who governed Salta and Buenos Aires provinces, and Juan R. Aguirre Lanari, a senator and government minister.

The Party was a member of the national Recrear electoral alliance then led by Ricardo López Murphy, having backed López Murphy for president in 2003.
