= Humanist Party (Argentina) =

Political party in Argentina

Humanist Party Partido Humanista
- Secretary-General: Gustavo Viglieca
- Founded: 8 March 1984
- Headquarters: Buenos Aires, Argentina
- Membership (2016): 18,548
- Ideology: Universal humanism
- Political position: Left-wing
- National affiliation: Frente de Todos
- Regional affiliation: São Paulo Forum
- International affiliation: Humanist International
- Colours: Orange

Website
- www.partidohumanistadeargentina.org

The Humanist Party (Spanish: Partido Humanista) is a progressive political party in Argentina and is a member of the Humanist International. The party was founded in 1984 by Luis Alberto Ammann.

Its "five basic points" are:

1. The human being as a value and central focus
2. Nonviolence as method of action
3. The principle of options (economic, organizational, and ideological)
4. Nondiscrimination
5. A new kind of economy

The party is currently a member of the Front for Victory.

The party is part of the Frente de Todos coalition supporting the 2019 Argentine presidential candidate Alberto Fernandez during the 2019 Argentine general election.
