= Ricardo López Murphy =

Argentine economist and politician

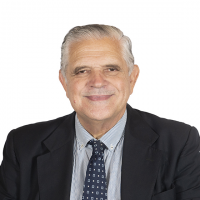
- Murphy in 2021

National Deputy
- Incumbent
- Assumed office 10 December 2021
- Constituency: City of Buenos Aires

Minister of Economy
- In office 5 March 2001 – 20 March 2001
- President: Fernando de la Rúa
- Preceded by: José Luis Machinea
- Succeeded by: Domingo Cavallo

Minister of Defense
- In office 10 December 1999 – 5 March 2001
- President: Fernando de la Rúa
- Preceded by: Jorge Domínguez
- Succeeded by: Horacio Jaunarena

Personal details
- Born: August 10, 1951 (age 75) Adrogué, Argentina
- Party: Radical Civic Union (1983–2002); Recreate for Growth (2002–2008; 2018–2020); Autonomist Party (2011); United Republicans (2020–present)
- Other political affiliations: Alliance (1999–2001); Republican Proposal (2005); Federal Convergence (2008–2011); Juntos por el Cambio (2021–present)
- Spouse: Norma Ruiz
- Education: National University of La Plata; University of Chicago

Ricardo Hipólito López Murphy (born 10 August 1951) is an Argentine economist, academic and politician. He served as Minister of Defense and Minister of Economy during the presidency of Fernando de la Rúa. His time at the helm of the economy portfolio lasted only 15 days, as he was forced to leave office after announcing an unpopular austerity plan. Since 2021, he has been a National Deputy elected in Buenos Aires for the Juntos por el Cambio coalition.

He was chairman of Liberal Network for Latin America, an association of institutions to promote liberalism. Currently, he chairs the think tank Republican Civic Foundation.

Originally a member of the centrist Radical Civic Union (UCR), López Murphy describes himself ideologically as a republican liberal. Since 2020, he has chaired his own political party, United Republicans.

== Early years ==
López Murphy was born in Adrogué, Buenos Aires Province of Basque and Irish descent. He was named Ricardo after Argentine politician Ricardo Balbín (who was his godfather) and Hipólito after radical president Hipólito Yrigoyen. He attended the National University of La Plata, where he was awarded the title degree in Economics, comprising four years of study in 1975. He then obtained a Master's degree in Economics from the University of Chicago in 1980.

== Private sector ==
In his professional activity he worked as a consultant and economic advisor to companies, international investors and financial institutions in Argentina and Latin America. He was a consultant to the Inter-American Development Bank, World Bank, International Monetary Fund and chief economist of the Latin American Economic Research Foundation.

He received the Konex Prize in 1996.

== Minister of Defense ==
In 1999, he entered politics when he was appointed Minister of Defense as a member of the Radical Civic Union (UCR). He remained in this position until 2001 when he briefly took the position of Minister of Economy in the government of Argentina.

== Minister of Economy ==
López Murphy announces his proposal for fiscal austerity in March 2001.

Enjoying little political support from President, Fernando de la Rúa, he was fired within two weeks after a wave of protest over his proposed fiscal austerity project, by which he sought to prevent the 2001 economic crisis but which sharply cut public spending.

== Politics ==
He founded a conservative liberal political party, Recreate for Growth (RECREAR), in 2002, and ran for the presidency in the April 2003 elections, finishing third behind Carlos Menem and Néstor Kirchner, with 16.3% of the popular vote. López Murphy won abroad. He was the favorite of the hundreds of Argentines who voted in the United States, Italy, Great Britain, Spain, Chile, Uruguay and Brazil.

He later teamed with Mauricio Macri in 2005 to create a new center-right coalition called Republican Proposal (PRO), which tacitly supported his unsuccessful second bid to the presidency in the 2007 presidential election. López Murphy did poorly, gaining just 1% of the vote; PRO, however, did somewhat better in provincial and congressional elections, and won the mayoral election in Buenos Aires that year.

He left RECREAR in April 2008, citing differences over party list strategy, and in December established Federal Convergency. He ran for Mayor of Buenos Aires in 2011 on this ticket, but obtained only 1.4% of the vote.

== Personal life ==
López Murphy is married with three children. He is often referred to in the media as "the Bulldog", a nickname he has come to embrace himself. He is described as an economist with a graduate degree from the University of Chicago, a militant Catholic and a fan of San Lorenzo de Almagro. He is against decriminalization of drug use, and abortion. He has called himself "an Alem and Alberdi liberal".

I follow the Argentine liberal tradition of [Juan Bautista] Alberdi, [Leandro] Alem and [Marcelo T.] Alvear. I am very proud of that. My ascription to liberal theories is not economic. That is a minor issue. I am part of a philosophical and moral tradition that has to do with defending the division of powers, controlling whoever exercises power, ensuring equality before the law and preventing someone from claiming the project of my happiness. With having the freedom and autonomy to decide my own future. I think it is very bad that the defense of liberal ideas is in charge of economists, because in general they start on the wrong side.

== Electoral history ==
=== Executive ===
Electoral history of Ricardo López Murphy
Election	Office	List	Votes			Result	Ref.
Election	Office	List	Total	%	P.	Result	Ref.
2003	President of Argentina	Recreate for Growth	3,173,584	16.37%	3rd	Not elected	
2007	President of Argentina	Recreate for Growth	273,406	1.43%	6th	Not elected	
2011	Chief of Government of Buenos Aires	Autonomist Party	24,911	1.40%	8th	Not elected	

=== Legislative ===
Electoral history of Ricardo López Murphy
Election	Office	List	#	District	Votes			Result	Ref.
Election	Office	List	#	District	Total	%	P.	Result	Ref.
2005	National Senator	Republican Proposal	1	Buenos Aires Province	509,756	7.63%	5th (Note: Presented on an electoral list. The data shown represents the share of the vote the entire party/alliance received in that constituency.)	Not elected	
2007	National Deputy	Recreate for Growth	1	Buenos Aires Province	106,681	1.58%	8th	Not elected	
2021	National Deputy	Juntos por el Cambio	4	City of Buenos Aires	867,044	47.09%	4th	Elected	

Political offices
Preceded by Jorge Domínguez	Minister of Defense; 1999–2001	Succeeded by Horacio Jaunarena
Preceded by José Luis Machinea	Minister of Economy; 2001	Succeeded by Domingo Cavallo
