= Presidency of Carlos Menem =

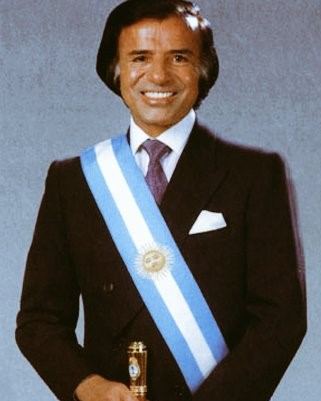
- Presidency of Carlos Menem; 8 July 1989 – 10 December 1999
- President: Carlos Menem
- Party: Justicialist Party (PJ)
- Election: 1989 • 1995
- Seat: Casa Rosada; Quinta de Olivos
- Standard of the President

The presidency of Carlos Saúl Menem lasted from 8 July 1989, the date of his inauguration, to 10 December 1999, the date on which his second term ended and his successor, Fernando de la Rúa, took office. It was a government described as liberal-conservative, which in Argentina is normally associated with the right.

He won the 1989 elections in the first round with 48.51% of the votes and was re-elected in the 1995 elections with 49.95% of the votes.

== Economic policy ==
Domingo Cavallo introduces the Convertibility Plan in 1991

When Menem began his presidency, there was a huge hyperinflation and recession. The first measure was a mandatory conversion of time deposits into government bonds. It generated more recession, but hyperinflation was lowered. Despite being a Peronist, Menem privatized several state-owned companies, such as telephones and airlines. One of the leading privatizations was YPF, engaged in the exploration and production of oil and gas.

His fourth economy minister, Domingo Cavallo, deepened the neoliberal reforms. He proposed a Convertibility Plan that set a one-to-one fixed exchange rate between the Argentine peso and the US dollar. The law also limited public expenditures, but this was frequently ignored.

A dramatic influx of foreign direct investment funds helped tame inflation (from 5,000% a year in 1989 to single digits by 1993) and improved long-stagnant productivity, though at the cost of considerable unemployment.

Menem's successful turnaround of the economy made the country one of the top performers in the world of the developing countries. Argentina's GDP (below 1973 levels when Menem took office) increased 35% from 1990 to 1994 and fixed investment, by 150%. Negotiations with Brazil resulted in the Mercosur customs union in March 1991. On 14 November that year, Menem addressed a joint session of the U.S. Congress, one of only three Argentine presidents to do so (others were Raúl Alfonsín and Arturo Frondizi).

With these successes, Menem was reelected to the presidency by a large majority in the 1995 elections. The early success of the dollar peg (when the dollar was falling) was followed by increasing economic difficulties when the dollar began to rise from 1995 onwards in international markets. High external debt also caused increasing problems. Financial crises affecting other countries (the Tequila Crisis in Mexico, the East Asian financial crisis, the Russian financial crisis in 1998) led to higher interest rates for Argentina as well. By the end of Menem's term, Argentina's country risk premium was a low 6.10 percentage points above yield on comparable US Treasuries.

== Domestic policy ==
=== Overview ===
President Menem in a 1992 address outlining his plans for the reform of the nation's educational system, as well as for the privatization of the YPF oil concern, and of the pension system

Menem began his presidency assuming a nonconfrontational approach, and appointing people from the conservative opposition and business people in his cabinet.

Menem's presidency was initially bolstered by the significant economic recovery following Cavallo's appointment as Economy Minister. His Justicialist Party enjoyed victories in mid-term elections in 1991 and 1993, as well as in his 1995 campaign for reelection.

In domestic policy, his administration created programs to improve AIDS awareness, increased flood prevention, vaccination, and improved child nutrition. In addition, his government launched a Social Plan to increase spending on antipoverty programs, while other social programs addressed needs for poor Argentines. These policies arguably had a positive impact on poverty reduction, with the percentage of Argentines estimated to be living in poverty falling during Menem's first term as president. The Argentine quota law, proposed by the UCR, increased the number of women in the Argentine Congress.

In 1994, after a political agreement (the Olivos Pact) with the Radical Civic Union party leader, former president Raúl Alfonsín, Menem succeeded in having the Constitution modified to allow presidential re-election. He ran for office once again in 1995.

The new Constitution also introduced decisive checks and balances to presidential power. It made the Mayor of Buenos Aires an elective position (previously the office was designated for political appointees, who controlled a huge budget in the capital). The opposition candidate was elected as mayor in 1996. The president of the Central Bank and the Director of the AFIP (Federal Tax & Customs Central Agency), while political appointees, could be removed only with the approval of Congress. The new constitution created an ombudsman position, and a board to review and propose new judicial candidates.

The majority of the population criticized Menem's neoliberal policies, as did some in the Catholic Church. Opponents among unemployed workers developed the Piquetero movement. Some economists said his financial policies were anti-liberal. These mounting problems and a rise in crime rates contributed to defeat for his party during the 1997 mid-term elections, the first time his administration faltered.

=== Education policy ===
==== Primary and secondary education ====
In 1993, the Federal Education Law was enacted, which extended compulsory education to ten years and reorganized secondary education through the creation of the Polimodal.

Thus, from the enactment of that Law, the 5-year-old kindergarten level became compulsory, as did the 9 years of Basic General Education (EGB) up to the first year of Polimodal Education.

==== Higher education ====
In August 1995, the Higher Education Law was promulgated, which maintained free university education for undergraduate degree programs but allows fees for postgraduate studies. It also created the National Commission for University Evaluation and Accreditation (CONEAU) for the accreditation of university degree programs.

==== Creation of CONEAU ====
The creation of the National Commission for University Evaluation and Accreditation (CONEAU) was met with resistance from most student centers and from some universities. The University of Buenos Aires, the National University of Comahue and the National University of Entre Ríos, among others, filed amparo appeals. In the case of the University of Buenos Aires, the courts upheld the appeal and since then it has been exempted, among other matters, from the requirement to accredit its degree programs before CONEAU.

=== Science and technology policy ===
During the administration of President Carlos Menem (1989–1999), some transformations took place in the national science and technology system in a context of severe budget constraints. In 1996, a restructuring of CONICET was decreed, granting it the status of an autarkic and decentralized entity under the jurisdiction of the Secretariat of Science. Although elections were called for the agency's board of directors, the authorities never took office because it was placed under the intervention of the Secretariat of Science, first headed by Domingo Liotta and then by Juan Carlos del Bello.

==== Creation of CONAE and satellite development ====
===== Creation of CONAE =====
After the government ordered the cancellation of the Condor program, which would have provided Argentina with its own satellite launcher, the CNIE was dissolved and gave way to CONAE, created on 28 May 1991 by the government of Carlos Menem.

It inherited the Air Force's aerospace facilities located in the city of Buenos Aires, the bases in Falda del Carmen, Córdoba Province, as well as part of the civilian personnel involved in the cancelled project. It also inherited the Chamical Self-Propelled Projectile Experimentation and Launch Center base, where experiments were resumed.

In 1998, it was invited by NASA to join the project for the construction of the International Space Station (ISS). But the government rejected the offer because it involved an expenditure of 10 million dollars, which was a great deal of money at the time. Even so, it was limited to participating only through the carrying out of some experiments.

In November 2012, by means of Decree 2197/2012, the National Commission on Space Activities (CONAE) was transferred to the orbit of the Ministry of Federal Planning, Public Investment and Services.

Through Decree 242/2016, the Executive Branch provided that from 26 January 2016 CONAE would become part of the Ministry of Science, Technology and Innovation of the Nation.

===== Argentine Space Program =====
This program aims to improve the country's space technology and carry out research for peaceful purposes and for the country's benefit. During these years, numerous satellites were developed in collaboration with the space agencies of Brazil and Italy. These then had to be sent to the United States to be launched; for this reason, one of this program's fundamental objectives is to create a launch platform, most likely in the provinces of Córdoba or Tierra del Fuego.

====== SAC Series Project ======
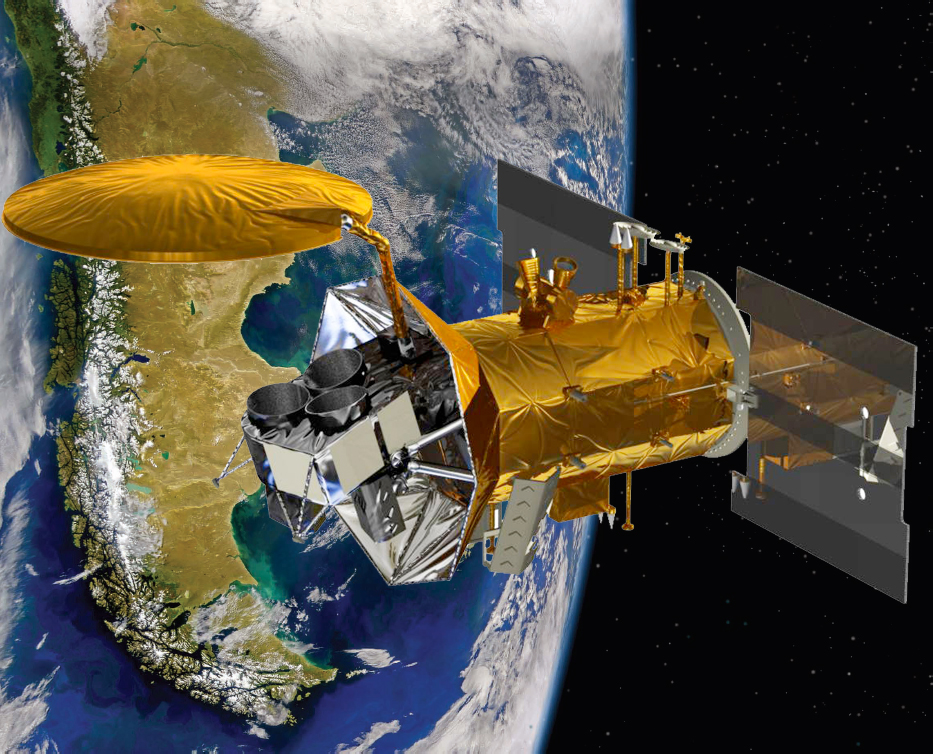
SAC-D satellite.

SAC-B was launched in November 1996. The objectives of SAC-B, as the first Argentine scientific satellite, were the advanced study of solar physics and astrophysics, through the observation of solar flares, gamma ray bursts, diffuse background X-radiation and high-energy neutral atoms. The mission enabled the training of a significant human team both for the preparation of the control centers (hardware and software) and for satellite control.

SAC-A was launched on 3 December 1998. It tested a series of instruments developed in the country, potentially applicable in other missions. It was also devoted to testing both the material infrastructure and the human infrastructure of the telemetry, telecommand and control teams.

====== SAOCOM Project ======
The SAOCOM project was presented in 1998, with the aim of providing information on soils, water and vegetation, as well as disaster prevention and management through observations with its radar in L band.

Since 1992, CONAE and the Italian Space Agency collaborated on the SAC-B and SAC-C projects. At the same time that CONAE was announcing the SAOCOM project, Italy began developing the COSMO-SkyMed project with similar characteristics, although with a dual role (civilian and military) and an X band radar antenna. The good relations between the agencies led to a series of preliminary talks that took place in the late 1990s and early 2000s, in which the foundations were laid for what would become SIASGE, the Italian-Argentine Satellite System for Emergency Management. This system, which was signed in July 2005, allows the sharing of information obtained by the Argentine and Italian satellites as well as the use of ground stations.

==== Creation of ANPCYT ====
The National Agency for the Promotion of Science and Technology (ANPCyT) was created in December 1996 by Decree 1660/96 and began its activities on 20 May 1997.

==== Creation of Innova-T ====
The INNOVA-T Foundation was created in 1993 by CONICET with the aim of promoting and fostering research, development and innovation (R&D&I) and Technological Linkage (VT) as instruments for improving the productive activity of goods and services. Under the terms of Law 23.877, on "Promotion and Fostering of Technological Innovation", enacted by the Argentine Congress on 28 September 1990, the INNOVA-T Foundation is a Technological Linkage Unit (UVT).

==== Creation of SEGEMAR ====
The Argentine Geological and Mining Survey (SEGEMAR) is an Argentine decentralized entity that operates under the orbit of the Ministry of Economy, whose mission is to promote technological development in the mining area while considering social and environmental aspects.

It was created in 1996 and is responsible for having discovered 8 out of every 10 areas with mineral resources found in the country.

=== Transport policy ===
==== Privatization of Aerolíneas Argentinas ====
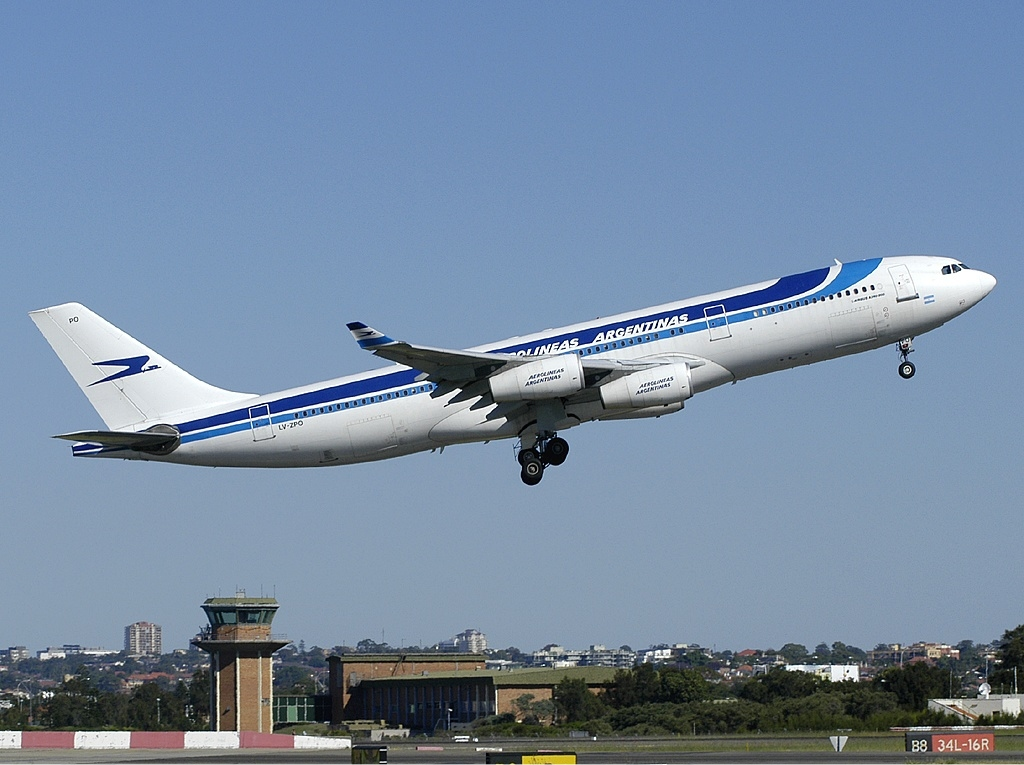
Airbus A340-200 of Aerolíneas displaying the Iberian livery used during this period.

In 1990, after its corporate form was changed from a state-owned enterprise to a public limited company (ARSA), the company was sold by the government of Carlos Menem to the Spanish state-owned airline Iberia. The company was transferred without liabilities, since the State had previously absorbed its debt. Iberia paid 1.61 billion dollars in government bonds and only 260 million in cash; in order to obtain the funds, they incurred debt and transferred the liabilities to Aerolíneas Argentinas' own accounts. They sold commercial offices in the country and abroad, flight simulators, and the twenty-eight aircraft that made up the fleet. They also dismantled workshops and eliminated dozens of routes and stopovers. In July 1992, the Argentine State assumed 28% of the shares, which added to the 10% it had held since the beginning of the privatization reached 33%. Other minority Argentine partners, including employees, together with the Argentine State held 51%. Iberia retained only 30%, while the remaining 19% was in the hands of various Spanish banks. Thus, the majority of Aerolíneas' capital was once again in the hands of shareholders from the southern country. Subsequently, in 1996, US banks such as Merrill Lynch and Bankers Trust entered the capital, as did the US airline American Airlines. In 1996, the restructuring of shareholding reduced Iberia's participation to 8%, with ownership largely controlled by the Sociedad Española de Participaciones Industriales, successor to the Instituto Nacional de Industria (a holding company of Spanish public enterprises), making Argentine participation in the capital a minority. Despite the increase in passengers in 1996 and 1997 and the reduction of Aerolíneas' liabilities, it was not enough to make the company's operations viable. The situation did not improve, and in 2000 it filed for bankruptcy protection.

During this period, older aircraft were sold and many properties were disposed of, and some assets were loaned out. Internal problems within Iberia and its subsidiaries led it to bankruptcy in 1994, at which point the shares of Aerolíneas were transferred to the Sociedad Española de Participaciones Industriales, a public industrial holding entity of the Government of Spain. During this period, Aerolíneas merged its operations with the Argentine domestic airline Austral Líneas Aéreas. By the end of the 1990s, the company was technically bankrupt. The Spanish government attempted to sell its shares to American Airlines, which managed the airline for nine months but ultimately rejected the offer.

In June 2001, Aerolíneas suffered the worst crisis in its history: flights to seven international destinations were suspended and the airline entered bankruptcy protection (suspension of payments). In July of the same year, the airline Aero Continente submitted to SEPI an offer to purchase the Argentine company for 100 million dollars.

In October 2001, control of Aerolíneas Argentinas and Austral Líneas Aéreas was transferred to the Grupo Marsans (a Spanish consortium formed by the private airlines Spanair and Air Comet), which acquired 92.1% of the shares. The Auditoría General de la Nación then determined that Aerolíneas Argentinas, after eighteen years of Spanish management, had been left with negative equity of 2.5 billion pesos and liabilities of 890 million dollars. Air Comet was equipped through the companies of the Aerolíneas Group; it relied on the businesses of the Aerolíneas Group companies to leverage the growth of different business units, such as Air Comet Europa, Air Comet Chile, Marsans Internacional Argentina and Marsans Internacional Chile, which led Aerolíneas into a state of extreme precariousness.

=== Health policy ===
==== Creation of INCUCAI ====
Scientific advances made it possible to carry out lung transplants in Argentina in 1992. The following year, Law 24,193 on Organ Transplantation was approved, legislation that remains in force today with the modifications introduced by Law 26,066. Later, pancreas transplants began, followed by intestine transplants.

==== Creation of ANMAT ====
The ANMAT was created by Decree 1490 on 20 August 1992, within the former Ministry of Health and Social Action of the Nation. Its origin stems from an event that shocked society: poisoning caused by syrup and propolis candies contaminated with diethylene glycol, a chemical compound used as antifreeze in radiators and as brake fluid in motor vehicles, which caused the death of 25 people. This led to the review and adaptation of all regulations governing the control of the quality and safety of products, substances, elements and materials consumed or used in human medicine, food, and cosmetics, as well as oversight of the activities, processes, and technologies involved in or encompassed by those areas. In this regard, President Carlos Menem established the National Administration of Drugs, Foods and Medical Technology (ANMAT) through Decree No. 1490/92.

==== Agriculture and livestock policy ====
The Secretariat of Agriculture, Livestock and Fisheries was held for most of Menem's presidency by Felipe Solá (1989–1991, 1993–1999). During his administration, the use of transgenic soybean was authorized for the first time, specifically a variety resistant to the herbicide glyphosate. The campaign against foot-and-mouth disease launched in 1989 allowed the country to have its last outbreak of the disease in April 1994 and to be declared free of the disease in 1996. The following year, Argentina resumed exporting fresh meat.

==== Creation of SENASA ====
SENASA arose from the provisions of article 38 of National Decree No. 660 of 24 June 1996, based on Law 24,629, which merged the former National Animal Health Service (Senasa) and the Argentine Institute of Plant Health and Quality (IASCAV), thereby establishing the current agency.

=== Environmental policy ===
In 1996, the National Fire Management Plan was created, under the Secretariat of Environment and Sustainable Development of the Nation. In 2012 it was renamed the National Fire Management Service.

=== Judicial and human rights policy ===
In judicial matters, the 1994 constitutional reform introduced new institutions such as the Council of the Magistracy, which is responsible for the selection of judges. During his administration, the number of justices of the Supreme Court was expanded to nine, and a total of 10 justices were appointed, four of whom resigned before 1999. Five of the appointed justices formed what the media called the "Automatic majority", which ruled in favor of the government in the most prominent cases.

In terms of human rights, the government of Menem granted pardons to military personnel involved in the last military dictatorship. At the request of the Grandmothers of the Plaza de Mayo, the National Commission for the Right to Identity was created. Also notable was the creation of the National Institute against Discrimination, Xenophobia and Racism (INADI).

==== Creation of the Council of the Magistracy ====
The Council of the Magistracy was incorporated into the National Constitution in the 1994 reform during the presidency of Carlos Menem. Article 114 of the reformed constitution establishes:

The Council of the Magistracy, regulated by a special law enacted by the absolute majority of the total membership of each Chamber, shall be responsible for the selection of magistrates and the administration of the Judicial Branch.

Its organizational structure and functions are regulated by Law 24,937 of the Council of the Magistracy, enacted on 10 December 1997, with several subsequent amendments.

==== Creation of the role of Ombudsman ====
The figure of the Ombudsman originates from Scandinavian law (from Sweden) and was introduced into the Argentine legal framework in the 1994 constitutional reform. Article 86 of the National Constitution establishes:

The Ombudsman is an independent body established within the sphere of the National Congress, which shall act with full functional autonomy, without receiving instructions from any authority. Its mission is the defense and protection of human rights and other rights, guarantees and interests protected by this Constitution and the laws, against acts, omissions or actions of the Administration; and the oversight of the exercise of public administrative functions.

The Ombudsman has legal standing. He or she is appointed and removed by Congress with the vote of two-thirds of the members present in each of the Chambers. He or she enjoys the immunities and privileges of legislators. The term of office shall be five years, and the Ombudsman may be reappointed once.

The organization and functioning of this institution shall be regulated by a special law.

The first ombudsman was Jorge Luis Maiorano, who took office on 16 June 1994 and remained in the position until the end of the government of Carlos Menem.

==== Creation of the Office of the Auditor General of the Nation ====
It was created in 1992 by Law No. 24,156, enacted on 30 September of that year and promulgated on 26 October. It was established to perform the role of "external control body of the national public sector", under the authority of the National Congress. The law assigns it "...the subsequent external control of budgetary, economic, financial, patrimonial, and legal management, as well as the issuance of opinions on the financial statements of the central administration..." (art. 117, Law No. 24,156).

This law also provided for the dissolution of the General Syndicature of Public Enterprises (SiGEP), an external control body created in 1978 during the self-styled "National Reorganization Process" dictatorship.

Following the 1994 constitutional reform, Article 85 of the Constitution established:

The external control of the national public sector in its patrimonial, economic, financial and operational aspects shall be an inherent power of the Legislative Branch.

The examination and opinion of the Legislative Branch on the performance and general situation of the public administration shall be based on the reports of the Auditor General of the Nation.
This technical assistance body of Congress, with functional autonomy, shall be composed in the manner established by the law regulating its creation and operation, which must be approved by an absolute majority of the members of each Chamber. The president of the body shall be appointed at the proposal of the political party of the opposition with the largest number of legislators in Congress.

It shall be responsible for the legality control, management oversight and auditing of all activities of the centralized and decentralized public administration, regardless of its organizational form, and for any other functions granted by law. It shall necessarily intervene in the process of approval or rejection of the accounts of collection and expenditure of public funds.

— Article 85 of the Constitution of the Argentine Nation

The constitutional text provided that Congress would enact a specific law to regulate its creation and functioning. However, this mandate (which requires approval "by an absolute majority of the members of each Chamber") remains unfulfilled to this day. This situation has led to institutional instability in the AGN.

==== Pardons ====
A series of ten decrees were issued on 7 October 1989 and 30 December 1990 by the then president of Argentina, Carlos Menem, pardoning civilians and military personnel who committed crimes during the self-styled National Reorganization Process dictatorship, including members of the juntas convicted in the Trial of the Juntas of 1985, the prosecuted Minister of Economy José Alfredo Martínez de Hoz, and leaders of guerrilla organizations. Through these decrees, more than 1,200 people were pardoned.

==== Creation of INADI ====
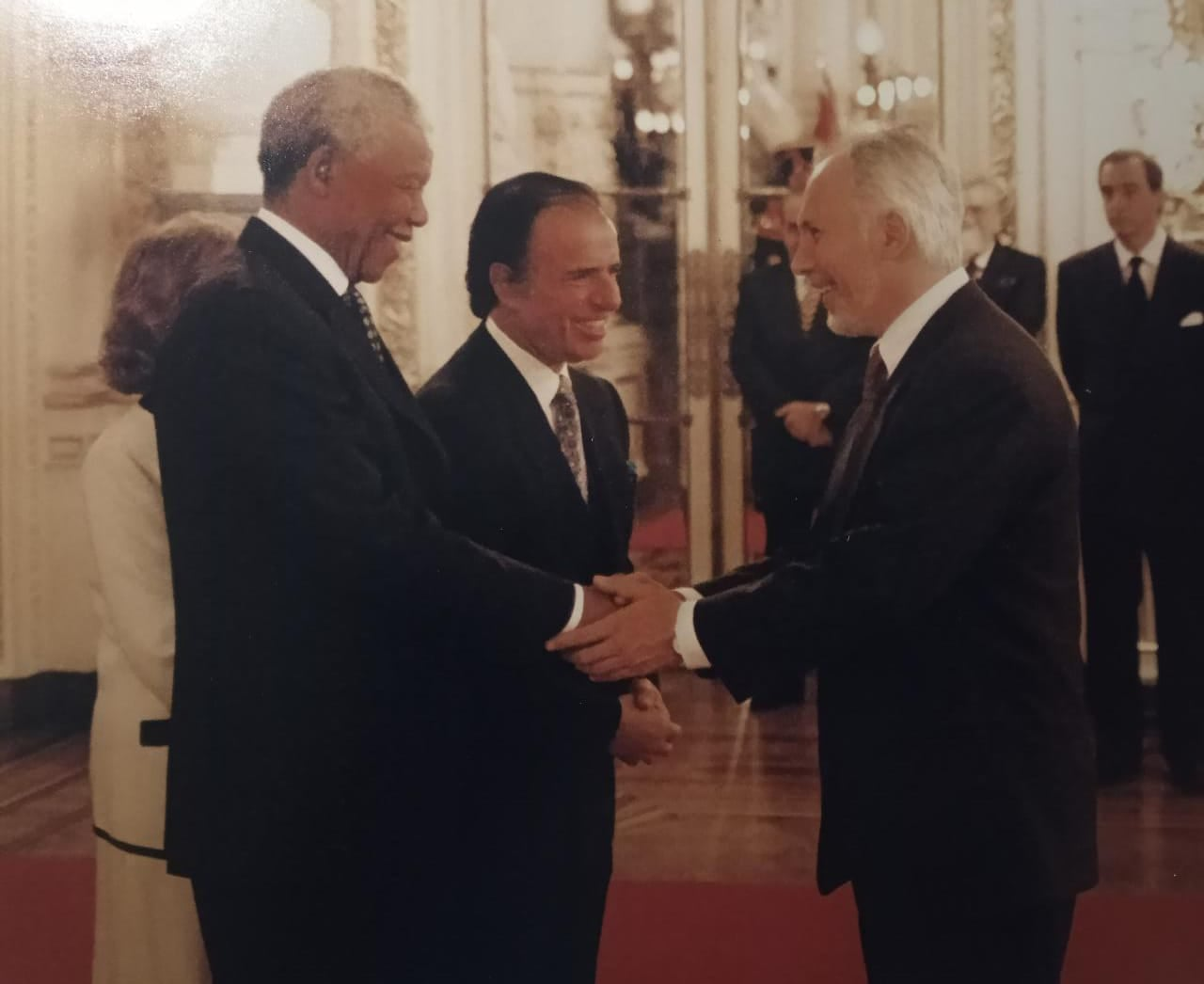
Nelson Mandela and Víctor Ramos greet each other in the presence of President Carlos Menem.

On 5 July 1995, during the presidency of Carlos Menem, Law 24,515 was enacted, creating the National Institute against Discrimination, Xenophobia and Racism, which began its activities in 1997.

=== 1994 constitutional reform ===
==== Olivos Pact and the Basic Coincidences Core ====
The Olivos Pact between Menem and former president Raúl Alfonsín was an agreement to shorten the presidential term while allowing re-election for a single term, considering the current mandate as the first term; to establish a system of direct voting with a modified runoff for presidential elections; to expand the autonomy of the City of Buenos Aires; to increase the senatorial majority required to appoint members of the Supreme Court; to create new constitutional bodies such as the Council of the Magistracy to appoint federal judges; to create a Chief of the Cabinet accountable to the Congress; to create a third senator for the minority; to regulate decrees of necessity and urgency and legislation delegated to the Executive Branch; to create the Office of the Auditor General of the Nation to oversee the Executive Branch; to extend the ordinary sessions of Congress; among other measures.

==== Law 24 309 ====
Two weeks after the Olivos Pact, the PJ and the UCR presented a joint bill in the Chamber of Deputies to declare the necessity of constitutional reform. It obtained preliminary approval in the Chamber of Deputies on 22 December, with 191 votes in favor and 59 against. On 29 December, it received final approval as a law when it was passed in the Senate by 32 votes to 16. The senators introduced a modification to the text approved by the Deputies, which meant it had to return to the originating chamber for consideration. However, this did not occur, and on the same day it was promulgated as Law 24,309, declaring the need for reform and establishing the subjects and articles that could be amended.

The law included in its article 2 the "Basic Coincidences Core" that had been agreed upon in the Olivos Pact, establishing that it had to be voted on as a block, either in favor or against, a condition known as the "lock clause" or "package".

Additionally, article 3 specified other matters that were enabled to be subject to reform without needing to be voted on as a block. In its article 7, the law clarified that the reform could not make any changes to the single chapter of the first part of the Constitution, devoted to "Declarations, Rights and Guarantees" (arts. 1 to 35), corresponding to what international doctrine calls "entrenched clauses".

Although the majority of Peronist and Radical deputies and senators voted in favor of the law, a considerable group of political leaders opposed it. The most prominent was Radical senator Fernando de la Rúa, Alfonsín's main rival within the UCR, who five years later would win the party primary to become President of the Nation. Other important Radical leaders who opposed the reform were Federico Storani, Horacio Jaunarena and Hipólito Solari Yrigoyen. Some Peronists also opposed the reform, such as José Octavio Bordón and Alberto Rodríguez Saá.

The need to carry out the constitutional reform was also not supported by members of the recently formed Frente Grande (Carlos "Chacho" Álvarez, Graciela Fernández Meijide and Fernando "Pino" Solanas), the UCEDE member Álvaro Alsogaray, the socialists Alfredo Bravo, Guillermo Estévez Boero and Héctor Polino, and the carapintada Aldo Rico, among others.

Years later, the then president of the Supreme Court, Carlos Rosenkrantz, when substantiating his vote on the retirement age of judges established by the 1994 constitutional reform, considered that the reform was affected by "obscurity" due to the Olivos Pact, which he described as "nefarious":

As a final point, I want it to be recorded that for years I have maintained that judges should have a fixed term of office (15 or 20 years) with the possibility of renewal, but this should be introduced by constitutional reform through a precise, clear and concrete authorization of a Pre-Constituent Assembly. The 1994 constitutional reform already had enough obscurity with the nefarious Olivos Pact, for a matter as sensitive as this to also suffer from uncertainty of norms and constituent excesses.

— Vote of Justice Carlos Rosenkrantz in the Schiffrin case

== Armed forces ==
On 3 December 1990, Menem had ordered the forceful repression of a politically motivated uprising by a far-right figure, Col. Mohamed Alí Seineldín, ending the military's involvement in the country's political life.

Menem was strongly criticized for his pardon on 29 December 1990, of Jorge Videla, Emilio Massera, Leopoldo Galtieri and other men who had been leaders of the 1976–83 dictatorship responsible for government terrorism and the disappearance of an estimated 15,000 political prisoners. They were convicted in the 1985 Trial of the Juntas. He also pardoned some guerrilla leaders on the grounds of national reconciliation. Nearly 50,000 people gathered in protest in Buenos Aires. Former President Raúl Alfonsín called it "the saddest day in Argentine history."

The president effected drastic cuts to the military budget, and appointed Lt. Gen. Martín Balza as the Army's General Chief of Staff (head of the military hierarchy). Balza, a man of strong democratic convictions and a vocal critic of the Falklands War, had stood up for the legitimate government in every attempted coup d'état throughout his senior career. He gave the first institutional self-criticism about the Armed Forces' involvement in the 1976 coup and the ensuing reign of terror. Following the brutal murder of a conscript, Menem abolished conscription in 1994, decisively ending a military prerogative over society.

== Death of his son ==
Carlos Menem Jr., son of the president, died in a helicopter accident on 15 March 1995. He was 26 years old. His death remains a mystery, but his father and mother, Zulema Yoma de Menem, suspect he was murdered. Roberto Locles, a ballistics expert, believes that "Carlitos" died in an attempted assassination.

== Foreign policy ==
=== Overview ===
Menem's government re-established relations with the United Kingdom, suspended since the Falklands War, within months of taking office. He also earned plaudits for resolving territorial disputes with neighboring Chile. His administration peacefully solved more than 20 border issues with Chile, including the arbitration of the especially serious Laguna del Desierto dispute.

Menem's tenure suffered most from local economic fallout due to the Mexican peso crisis of 1995. It became tainted by repeated accusations by opponents of corruption. Menem administration's handling of the investigations of the 1992 Israeli Embassy bombing and the 1994 bombing of the AMIA Jewish community center in Buenos Aires were criticised as being dishonest and superficial. He is suspected of diverting the investigation from clues suggesting Iranian involvement, to avoid engaging with that power over the attacks as well as covering for a family friend, Alberto Kanoore Edul, a Syrian-Argentine businessman suspected of involvement in the attacks.

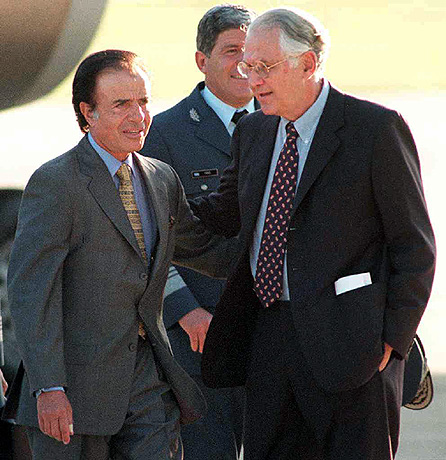
Menem alongside Foreign Minister Guido Di Tella

Menem's foreign policy marked a break with the continuity of the policy of his predecessor, Raúl Alfonsín, who had advocated for the Non-Aligned Movement, a grouping of which Argentina ceased to be a member in 1991.

During this administration, Argentina abandoned its neutral role and actively participated in the coalition force authorized by the United Nations in the Gulf War and in the Yugoslav Wars through the United Nations Protection Force and the Argentine Army Battalion.

=== Americas ===
==== Bolivia ====
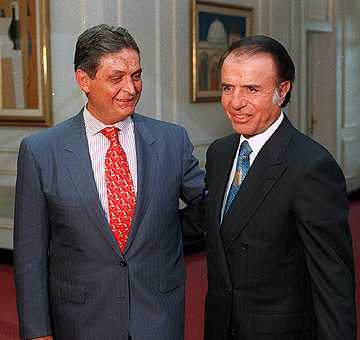
Menem alongside Jaime Paz Zamora in 1992

Menem's government had good diplomatic and trade relations with all the Bolivian presidents of that period (Jaime Paz Zamora, Gonzalo Sánchez de Lozada and Hugo Banzer). Notable developments include the signing of the Transit and Navigability Agreement for the Paraguay-Paraná Waterway and the granting of amnesty to undocumented Bolivians residing in Argentina in 1992, the signing of the Agreement on Regulation and Use of the Upper Basin of the Bermejo River and the Grande de Tarija River in 1995, and the signing of an agreement granting residence facilities to Bolivians settled in Argentina in 1998. In addition, payment for the import of Bolivian gas was resumed and the Yacuiba-Camiri-Isoso road was paved.

==== Brazil ====
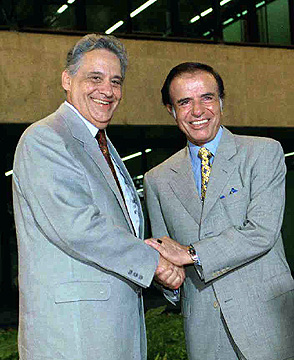
Menem alongside Fernando Henrique Cardoso in 1996

During this period, both countries maintained commercial and diplomatic competition. The most notable achievements were the creation of the Brazilian-Argentine Agency for Accounting and Control of Nuclear Materials and the Southern Common Market.

The most controversial issue of this period was the dispute over the permanent seat on the United Nations Security Council, if reform of the council were to advance. In 1999, the last year of Menem's government, tensions arose in the relationship because of Argentina's intention to impose protectionist measures that ran counter to Mercosur agreements. Brazilian president Fernando Henrique Cardoso went so far as to declare that "Argentina will understand that there are rules that cannot be violated and that certain safeguards are not appropriate". Ultimately, the measures were not imposed, following the change of government in Argentina.

==== Chile ====
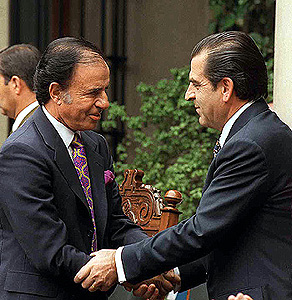
Menem alongside Eduardo Frei in 1996

Menem maintained a close relationship with Chile, both with President Patricio Aylwin and with Eduardo Frei Ruiz-Tagle. Former Chilean foreign minister José Miguel Insulza described Menem as "a friend of Chile; one of Chile's best friends".

The most important achievement of this period was the signing, in 1998, of a definitive agreement on the continental ice area, which put an end to all pending border disputes with that country.

==== Colombia ====
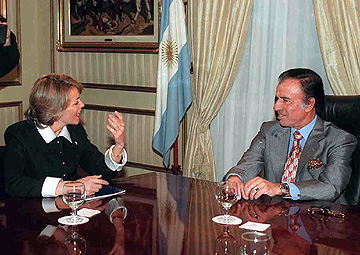
Menem alongside Colombian foreign minister María Emma Mejía in 1997

During his government, he was contemporaneous with the Colombian internal armed conflict, which pitted the Colombian state against guerrilla groups such as the FARC and the ELN. After tensions escalated in this conflict in 1999, reports emerged that Menem had supported the initiative of United States drug czar Barry McCaffrey, which proposed a military solution so that the Colombian military could recover lost territory. Menem came to compare the Colombian situation with the attempt by the Montoneros and the ERP to declare Tucumán a liberated zone. He ultimately visited Colombia and urged the guerrillas to abandon the armed path and declared that "The voice was never raised in Argentina to request intervention".

==== Cuba ====
After alignment with the United States, relations with Cuba worsened considerably, going from the previous president, Raúl Alfonsín, making an official visit to Havana to Menem never visiting the island during his entire term despite invitations from Fidel Castro.

Relations reached their most tense point in 1997, during the 7th Ibero-American Summit on Margarita Island, Venezuela, when Menem called for democracy in Cuba and an end to human rights violations on the island. A few months before leaving office, Menem refused to attend the 9th Ibero-American Summit taking place in Havana.

==== United States ====
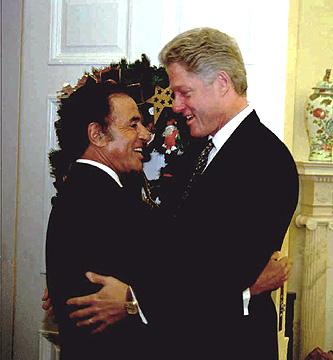
Menem alongside Bill Clinton in 1996

Relations between Argentina and the United States during this government were close and marked by Argentina's strong political and economic alignment with Washington. Menem established a foreign policy based on a strong rapprochement with the United States, humorously referred to as "carnal relations" by Foreign Minister Guido Di Tella.

During this period, Argentina supported the United States in international forums, such as the United Nations, and adopted positions favorable to U.S. interests on issues such as sanctions on Iraq and the fight against drug trafficking. It also participated in military conflicts alongside the United States, sending military personnel to the Gulf War and participating in Operation Uphold Democracy in Haiti.

In 1998, the United States designated Argentina a major non-NATO ally, during the presidency of Bill Clinton, thus becoming the first Latin American country to obtain that designation.

==== Paraguay ====
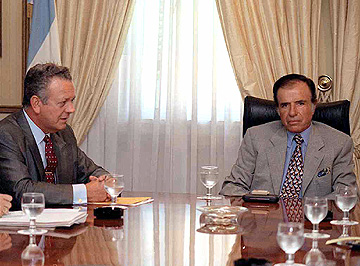
Menem alongside Juan Carlos Wasmosy in 1996

The inauguration of the Yacyretá-Apipé Hydroelectric Power Plant in 1994 stands out. Relations became strained in 1999, when Argentina denied the extradition of Lino Oviedo, a Paraguayan military officer who had been accused of attempting a coup d'etat against the then president of his country, Juan Carlos Wasmosy.

==== Peru ====
Despite maintaining a good relationship with the president of Peru, Alberto Fujimori, relations became strained after the illegal sending of Argentine arms to Ecuador was discovered, violating an international embargo established by the Rio de Janeiro Peace Treaty, in the context of the Cenepa War.

=== Asia ===
==== China ====
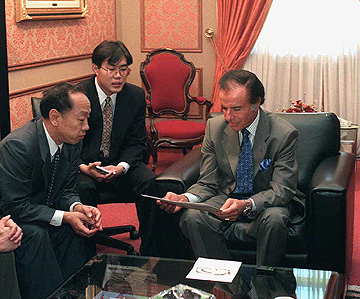
Menem alongside Chinese foreign minister Li Zhaoxing in 1997

In November 1990, Menem visited the People's Republic of China. He was one of the first heads of government of a Western country to visit the country after the Tiananmen Square protests of 1989. In October 1995, he visited the country again.

==== Israel ====
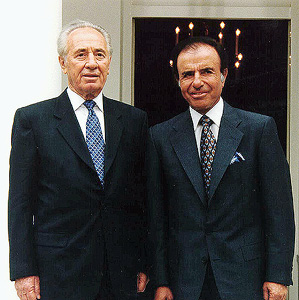
Menem alongside Israeli prime minister Shimon Peres in 1997

In October 1991, he became the first Argentine president to travel to Israel and proposed mediating between Israel and Syria in their negotiations over the Golan Heights.

Relations were tested even further when on 17 March 1992 a car bomb exploded at the Israeli embassy in Argentina, causing 22 deaths and 242 injuries. The Israeli government, led by Yitzhak Shamir, immediately condemned the attack, sent specialized personnel, and cooperated with the Argentine government in investigating the bombing.

==== Japan ====
During his term, several members of the Imperial Family of Japan visited the country. Prince Norihito of Takamado visited Argentina in 1991, Emperor Akihito and Empress Michiko in 1997, and Fumihito of Akishino in 1998. For his part, Menem traveled to Japan in January 1990 to attend the enthronement ceremony of Emperor Akihito, in December 1993, and in December 1998 for the celebration of the centenary of friendship between Japan and Argentina.

==== Palestine ====
In September 1989, Menem, at a Non-Aligned summit in Yugoslavia, greeted the president of the Palestine Liberation Organization (PLO), Yasser Arafat, something that had already happened during the de facto presidency of Reynaldo Bignone and had prompted complaints from Argentina's Jewish community. During his presidency he was invited by the PLO to Palestine, but the visit did not take place. Menem also unsuccessfully invited Arafat. Regarding the Arab-Israeli conflict, Menem, unlike Raúl Alfonsín, gave it importance and offered himself as a mediator in the negotiations, and also proposed Buenos Aires as the venue for a peace conference.

In 1994, then foreign minister Guido Di Tella met with Arafat in Tunis, where he offered to build housing and a school in Gaza, but the Palestinian leader emphasized the need for basic urban services that Argentina could not provide. In 1995 Argentina granted recognition to the Palestinian Authority. The following year, then interior minister Carlos Corach received the presidents of Israel and Palestine, handing them letters signed by Menem calling for peace. Arafat asked him to intercede with Shimon Peres over Israel's closure of the borders, which led Argentina to send White Helmets, resulting in Israel lifting restrictions on medicines and foodstuffs to the Palestinian territories. In the following years, White Helmets missions continued in Gaza and the West Bank.

=== Europe ===
==== Germany ====
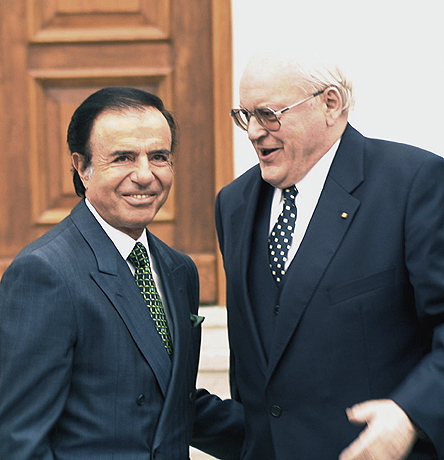
Menem alongside German president Roman Herzog in 1997

In 1991, Menem visited Germany and signed an agreement to promote and protect German investments. During the trip he visited Sanssouci Palace and toured the city of Bonn.

He visited the country again in 1997 and asked German Federal Chancellor Helmut Kohl for his country to invest in the forthcoming privatization process in Argentina.

==== France ====
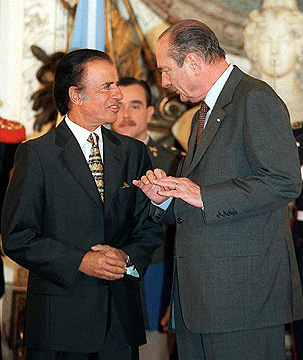
Menem alongside French president Jacques Chirac in 1997

France became one of the largest investors in Argentina, following the privatization process that originated during Menem's presidency. Its investments were close to 7 billion dollars by 1998.

In 1998, he visited France and demanded from French president Jacques Chirac a greater balance in trade with Argentina and that he reverse the French policy of subsidies to agricultural activity.

==== Italy ====
Argentina joined, together with Italy, the Uniting for Consensus movement, which aimed to oppose the possible enlargement of the United Nations Security Council.

==== United Kingdom ====
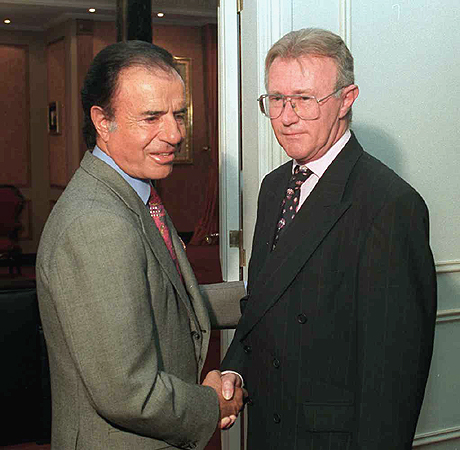
Menem alongside the British ambassador to Argentina, Peter Hall, in 1997

In 1989, he restored bilateral relations, following their rupture because of the Falklands War, with the United Kingdom through the Madrid Joint Declaration. This declaration was divided into two agreements called Madrid Agreement I and II. The first of these had as its main objective the restoration and normalization of both diplomatic relations and social ties. While in the second agreement, the final documents were agreed upon.

In 1991, a meeting took place with the aim of discussing the management of natural resources in the archipelago. Through this discussion, in 1995, they agreed on a joint declaration establishing that, in order to extract natural resources from the islands, both states should first cooperate in order to avoid conflicts.

In 1998, Carlos Menem made a visit to the United Kingdom, the first after the war. During this trip, Menem met with British prime minister Tony Blair and with Queen Elizabeth II at Buckingham Palace.

In 1999, the two countries agreed to normalize direct flights to the Falkland Islands, which had been blocked since 1982. These flights were operated by the Chilean company LAN Airlines, departing from Punta Arenas with a monthly stopover in Río Gallegos.

==== Russia ====
He traveled to Russia in 1990, meeting with the president of the Soviet Union, Mikhail Gorbachev, and in 1998, meeting with the president of the Russian Federation, Boris Yeltsin, to promote trade ties. On that trip, Menem congratulated Yeltsin "for the way communism was defeated here".

=== Multilateral organizations ===
==== Mercosur ====
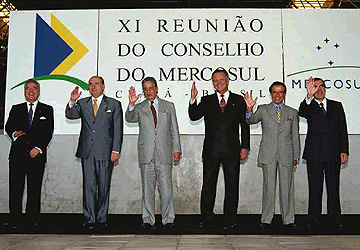
Menem at the 11th Meeting of the Mercosur Council in 1996

Menem was one of the founding presidents of the economic bloc Southern Common Market. On 26 March 1991, Argentina, Brazil, Paraguay and Uruguay signed the Treaty of Asunción, which adopted the name Mercosur, gave it a basic institutional structure, and established a free trade area. On 27 June 1992, in Las Leñas, he signed the Las Leñas Protocol, which established the definitive timetable toward the constitution of the common market. Finally, on 17 December 1994, the Ouro Preto Protocol was signed, which set Mercosur in motion.

=== Arms sales to Ecuador, Croatia and Bosnia ===
United States and NATO instigated the shipment of arms to the independence struggles of the SR of Croatia and the SR of Bosnia and Herzegovina from Argentina and, to a lesser extent, from Chile, in order to prevent the victory of the SR of Serbia, a country supported by Russia and Israel, and which also involved Iran, Turkey, Malaysia, Pakistan, Hungary, Saudi Arabia and Chile; in the case of Chile, intelligence networks remaining from those created for state terrorism in the 1970s and 1980s, such as Operation Condor, were used. High-ranking Croatian officials have publicly stated that thanks to the shipment of Argentine weapons that nation was able to arm itself to defend itself and that this made it possible to stop the war.

From 1992, various sources reported the use of Argentine weapons by Croatia in the Yugoslav Wars (1991–2001), and later by Bosnia and Herzegovina in the same conflict, as well as by Ecuador in the Cenepa War (1995) against Peru.

During those years, Argentina was governed by President Carlos Menem (1989–1999), who, together with Minister of Defense Oscar Camilión, signed three secret decrees between 1991 and 1995 authorizing the sale of war materiel manufactured at the Río Tercero Arms Factory to Panama (the first two) and Venezuela (the third).

In the case of Croatia and Bosnia and Herzegovina, the United Nations Security Council had imposed a general arms embargo in 1991. Despite this, parliamentary and journalistic investigations in the United States revealed that that country and NATO promoted the violation of the embargo in order to arm Croatia and Bosnia and Herzegovina against Serbia.

In the case of the conflict between Peru and Ecuador, Argentina was one of the guarantors of peace between the two countries agreed upon in the Rio Protocol of 1942.

On 3 November 1995, a series of major explosions at the Río Tercero Arms Factory occurred, killing seven people, injuring more than three hundred, and damaging part of the city of Río Tercero. The judicial investigation revealed that it was an intentional act aimed at destroying evidence of arms sales to Ecuador and Croatia.

== Cabinet ==
Office	Holder
President	Carlos Menem
Vice President	Eduardo Duhalde (1989–91); Carlos Ruckauf (1995–99)
Chief of Ministers' Cabinet	Eduardo Bauzá (1995–96); Jorge Alberto Rodríguez (1996–99)
Ministry of the Interior	Eduardo Bauzá (1989–90); Julio Mera Figueroa (1990–91); José Luis Manzano (1991–92); Gustavo Béliz (1992–93); Carlos Ruckauf (1993–95); Carlos Corach (1995–99)
Ministry of Foreign Affairs	Domingo Cavallo (1989–91); Guido di Tella (1991–99)
Ministry of Defense	Ítalo Argentino Luder (1989); Humberto Roggero (1989–90); Guido di Tella (1990–91); Antonio Erman González (1991–93); Oscar Camilión (1993–96); Jorge Domínguez (1996–99)
Ministry of the Economy	Miguel Ángel Roig (1989); Néstor Rapanelli (1989); Antonio Erman González (1989–91); Domingo Cavallo (1991–96); Roque Fernández (1996–99)
Ministry of Justice	Antonio Salonia (1989–91); León Arslanián (1991–92); Jorge Maiorano (1992–94); Rodolfo Barra (1994–96); Elías Jassán (1996–97); Raúl Granillo Ocampo (1997–99)
Ministry of Labor	Jorge Triaca (1989–91); Rodolfo Díaz (1991–92); Enrique Rodríguez (1992–93); José Armando Caro Figueroa (1993–97); Antonio Erman González (1997–99)
Ministry of Social Assistance and Public Health	Julio Corzo (1989–93); Antonio Erman González (1993); Eduardo Bauzá (1993–95); Alberto Kohan (1995–96); Avelino Porto (1996–98); Julio César Aráoz (1998); Alberto Mazza (1998–99)
Ministry of Education and Culture	Antonio Salonia (1989–92); Jorge Alberto Rodríguez (1992–96); Susana Decibe (1996–99)
Ministry of Public Services	Roberto Dromi (1989–91)

== Protests ==
=== Federal March of 1994 ===
The name Federal March (Marcha Federal) was given to a massive protest that took place in Argentina on 6 July 1994, during the government of the President of Argentina from the Justicialist Party, Carlos Menem, and drew around 50,000 demonstrators from various parts of the country.

=== Uprisings of Cutral Có and Plaza Huincul ===
Cutral Có and Plaza Huincul are located along National Route 22, a strategic route connecting Neuquén with the rest of the country and transporting fuel.

==== 1996 uprising ====
The first uprising broke out on Thursday, 20 June 1996, and lasted six days. Residents of Cutral Có and Plaza Huincul organized pickets and blocked the roads passing through those cities, demanding work. This was a type of protest without precedent in Argentina. From then on, the term "pickets" (piquetes) would begin to take on national significance as popular protest movements that use the blocking of roads, bridges, or streets as a means of pressure.

At that time, the unemployed in both cities numbered 8,000 people, equivalent to 26% of the economically active population, with privatizing companies responsible for 80% of that unemployment. Only 900 residents received any assistance plan, and the gas company was carrying out 70 service cut-offs daily due to non-payment. At the beginning of the harsh Patagonian winter, 1,500 households had already suffered gas supply cut-offs.

The protest was triggered by the decision of the governor of the Neuquén Province Felipe Sapag to interrupt negotiations with the Canadian company Agrium to install a fertilizer plant in Plaza Huincul, a project dating back to 1966 and which for the communities of Plaza Huincul and Cutral Có was the only hope of replacing the thousands of jobs lost with the privatization of YPF.

The news was broadcast in a highly critical manner from the morning through Radio Victoria (97.7), a local station aligned with the governor's main internal opponent, Jorge Sobisch, belonging to the "white current" of the same hegemonic political party in the province, the Neuquén People's Movement (MPN):

The betrayal of Felipe Sapag has been consummated, we are not going to have the fertilizer plant. It is Felipe's betrayal of Cutral Co.

— Radio Victoria, 20 June 1996

Alarmed listeners began sending messages repudiating the governor's decision and calling to "do something", "go to the road". Shortly afterward, thousands of people were walking or using their cars and trucks to occupy the road. A group of young workers began to set up "posts" or blockade "pickets" to sustain it over time, placing tires on the road and setting them on fire, creating bonfires, which is why picketers were also initially called "fogoneros" ("fire tenders").

A horizontal organization emerged, without any leadership, at most spontaneous spokespersons:

I admire, for example, at the Añelo picket or any other, the kids, whose names we now do not know, we do not know them, perhaps we will not see them again, who were there all night. All night those guys standing there. That young man who was there all night because he was convinced that his brain, not in his pants, because this was not won with guts but with the head, was what made him become a natural leader through presence. I remember this kid all dressed in black who was there from the first day the whole time, and he was no longer seen because of how black he was. When I said something, I sometimes felt I had no moral authority, but even so that neighborhood kid, like many others, gave you confidence and said: "well, you go, you represent me". It was as if he authorized you because he was the moral authority of the picket.

— Testimony of a picketer

The next day, Friday 21 June, the populations of both cities had committed themselves to the blockade. Radio FM Victoria began operating as a means of communication and coordination for the community. Schools suspended classes, shops closed, and even municipalities declared administrative leave for staff. Community halls were organized in various parts of the cities to store food, fuel, and other supplies needed to support the barricades. Several cars, trucks, and taxis were made available to transport for free those maintaining the blockade posts, and service stations decided to serve only firefighters, ambulances, and vehicles supporting the blockade.

The blockade continued throughout the weekend, day and night, despite temperatures reaching 10 degrees below zero. On Saturday afternoon, the first assembly was held, attended by local political leaders, but the assembly demanded that no political leader participate. "There was no one in charge", several residents said.

Governor Sapag publicly stated that the demonstrators were "criminals" and demanded that residents lift the blockade before granting them an audience to analyze solutions to the social situation. On Sunday, mediation by Bishop Agustín Radrizzani moderated the governor's position, who agreed to receive a delegation of picketers, but they reiterated to the priest that it was the governor who had to come speak with the people.

On Monday 24 June, following the governor's offer to dialogue the previous day, a popular assembly was held at the YPF refinery in Plaza Huincul, gathering 5,000 people. The assembly revealed two main positions: those who wanted to send a delegation to the provincial capital to negotiate with the governor, and those who wanted the governor to go to Cutral Có, arguing that no one could represent the people: "the pickets represent the pickets". The group that wanted to go to Neuquén chose a delegation, but the rest of the demonstrators prevented them from leaving the town. That night Governor Sapag spoke by radio about the situation, arguing that the province did not have the necessary funds to support the installation of the fertilizer plant and that it was not his fault that privatized YPF had laid off 3,500 people in both cities.

That same Monday, 24 June, Federal Judge Margarita Gudiño de Argüelles ordered the eviction of the road, while Interior Minister Carlos Corach sent a contingent of 400 gendarmerie officers, 33 vehicles, an armored vehicle, a water cannon truck, and dozens of dogs, led by Senior Commander Eduardo Jorge, who took positions surrounding both Neuquén cities. It would later be known that Jorge appeared in the records of CONADEP as responsible for the main clandestine detention center in Tucumán during the last dictatorship. By then, the blockade of vital Route 22 had caused fuel shortages throughout the province, including kerosene for heating, vital due to the low winter temperatures in Patagonia.

On Tuesday 25 June in the morning, the gendarmerie advanced on the first two posts, located eight kilometers from Plaza Huincul, clearing them without confrontation. But at noon, when the troops were four kilometers from the city, demonstrators began throwing stones at the security forces, who responded with water and tear gas, injuring several people. The incident generated widespread outrage, and the population joined the protest actively. By midday, 20,000 people occupied three kilometers of the road, half the population of both cities, and marched to meet Judge Gudiño at the central post known as La Torre.

Judge Gudiño de Argüelles then went to La Torre and climbed onto the roof of the radio van to address the demonstrators with a megaphone provided by the picketers. She explained that blocking the road was a crime and that they had to clear it. But the residents flatly rejected any possibility of leaving the road. Faced with the population's refusal, the judge said that what was happening was a crime of sedition and surprised everyone by declaring herself incompetent on the spot:

This exceeds me. I declare myself incompetent and withdraw from here with the gendarmerie.

— Judge Margarita Gudiño de Argüelles

Governor Sapag decided to go speak with the demonstrators in Cutral Có, where he arrived Tuesday afternoon accompanied by Bishop Radrizzani and part of his cabinet. After hesitating about whether to go to La Torre where people were gathered, he finally decided to appear and speak face to face with the population at 9 p.m. There he acknowledged that the popular movement was a "patriotic act" and that the blame lay with the liberal policies adopted by the national government. After speaking with the demonstrators, the governor decided to install his office in the Cutral Có municipal building for several days in order to speak with the population and find solutions.

On Wednesday 26 June in the morning, Governor Sapag opened the doors of his office installed in the municipal building and received a delegation of about thirty picketers. By noon, they had reached an agreement, which the residents demanded be put in writing and was recorded in a thirteen-point document. In it, the provincial government declared the region in a state of "employment and social emergency", committed to calling for an international tender within one month to install the fertilizer plant whose suspension had triggered the uprising, ordered the reconnection within 48 hours of all services cut for non-payment, established a public works plan to begin immediately, doubled the number of vouchers given to the municipality to purchase gas cylinders, and sent 650 boxes of food. In addition, the national government sent 40,000 rations of dehydrated food and milk powder, sugar, flour, and oil that same day.

The document also recorded that the agreement with the governor of Neuquén was made with "the Commission of Representatives of Roadblock Pickets".

Photocopies of the document were taken to the pickets to be read, and at 16:30 an assembly approved the agreement and decided to end the blockade. The population celebrated with a caravan of cars. By 17:00 the road was already cleared.

==== 1997 uprising ====
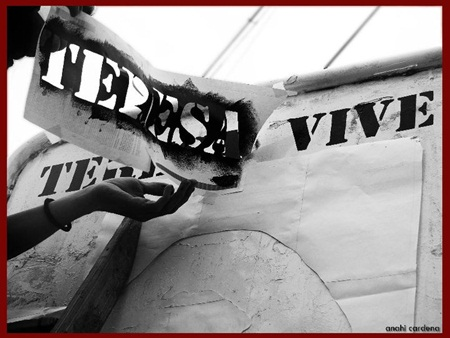
Restoration of the Teresa Rodríguez memorial during a commemorative event held in 2012. Teresa Rodríguez was a 24-year-old woman, mother of three children, who was killed during the second uprising.

The second uprising in Cutral Có took place in the context of a prolonged trade union conflict between teachers organized in the Asociación de Trabajadores de la Educación de Neuquén (ATEN) -member of CTERA and the CTA- and the province. In the context of the provincialization of education established by the Federal Education Law, the province had reduced salaries and eliminated workshops, non-programmatic hours, courses, and special schools. The teachers' union estimated that these measures would leave about 1,200 people without work and declared an indefinite strike from the first day of classes, which would last nearly two months.

On 24 March, anniversary of the last dictatorship and an annual day of mobilization, the teachers' march in the Neuquén city brought together ten thousand people from all social sectors and ended with the occupation of the bridges of National Route 22 linking the provinces of Neuquén and Río Negro. Teachers maintained the roadblocks until 27 March, when the gendarmerie violently cleared the bridges defended by young people from working-class neighborhoods of the city, leading the teachers' union to call on the population of all Neuquén cities to take the roads on 9 April.

In Cutral Có, that call by the union acted as a trigger. The population was very dissatisfied with the failure to comply with many of the points of the agreement reached in the previous year's uprising. On Wednesday 9 April, young people from working-class sectors known as "fogoneros", secondary school students, and the Parents' Committee in Defense of Education again blocked National Route 22 in solidarity with the teachers' strike, maintaining the pickets despite judicial orders and government pressure, which considered that the demonstrators were committing a crime.

On Saturday 12 April, the gendarmerie and provincial police, under orders of Federal Judge Oscar Temi, launched a violent assault against the young people at the pickets, driving them off the road and pursuing them into the city. But then the population took to the streets en masse to defend the youths. During the repression, security forces shot dead Teresa Rodríguez, a young mother of three, and wounded 20 others by gunfire. Public outrage led a crowd estimated at 20,000 people to surround the repressive forces, which, facing imminent danger, abandoned the cities, leaving them in the hands of the population.

The repression in Cutral Có, and especially the killing of Teresa Rodríguez, was harshly criticized by political forces opposed to the government of President Menem, trade unions, human rights organizations, and the Catholic Church. CTERA declared a nationwide general strike with a silent march in memory of Teresa Rodríguez, which took place with very high participation on Monday 14 April.

The two cities organized themselves by forming a Popular Assembly that effectively became the government, with a twelve-member secretariat renewed in thirds at each term and a Parents' Committee in solidarity with the teachers' strike.

On Tuesday 15 April, President Menem made statements about the events in Cutral Có, attributing responsibility for the violence to "beardless youths" (in reference to the confrontation between the Peronist left and Perón on 1 May 1974) and describing the protests as a "return of subversion". That same day the teachers' strike was lifted, and Governor Sapag agreed with President Menem on a plan of social measures: 800 welfare programs (Plan Trabajar), 500 new jobs at YPF, and plans to build one thousand homes, but negotiations between residents and Sapag stalled. That same day, Hebe de Bonafini of Mothers of the Plaza de Mayo, Elisa Carrió of the Radical Civic Union, and Laura Musa of the Frepaso went to Cutral Có to express their support for the uprising.

That same day, Clarín published an article specifically dedicated to the unemployed youths who had become central actors in the uprisings, titled "The 'fogoneros' are very young and have no work":

"Call me Negro. Last week I turned 19. I was born in Cutral-Có and I am the son of oil workers. I have three younger siblings, who are also here holding out with me. There is not much I can tell you about my life. I am just another unemployed person". His father died a year ago, "bitter and without a penny. When I was a child, I wanted to work in the YPF refinery, or driving one of those big trucks. But I ended up washing sidewalks until I was fired"... "I do not believe in politicians or trade unionists; they all sold us out. I took to the streets because I am tired of being messed around".

On Wednesday 16 April, the Popular Assembly, with the presence of the two mayors and several provincial deputies, decided to continue the road blockade. The CGT, for its part, declared a one-hour general strike per shift in repudiation of Teresa Rodríguez's killing, a measure criticized as insufficient by the Argentine Workers' Movement (MTA).

On Thursday 17 April, differences in positions became evident between the young "fogoneros", more hardline and distrustful of the government, and the middle-class and commercial sectors of the Assembly that sought to reach an agreement and lift the blockade after nine days.

On Friday 18 April, the Assembly provisionally lifted the blockade so that a commission could negotiate with Governor Sapag. It returned with a 19-point agreement based on what Sapag and Menem had agreed the previous Tuesday. Upon returning that night, the Assembly met again and approved the agreement, with opposition from the young "fogoneros", who maintained that "they had been given nothing".

== Corruption cases ==
=== IBM-Banco Nación case ===
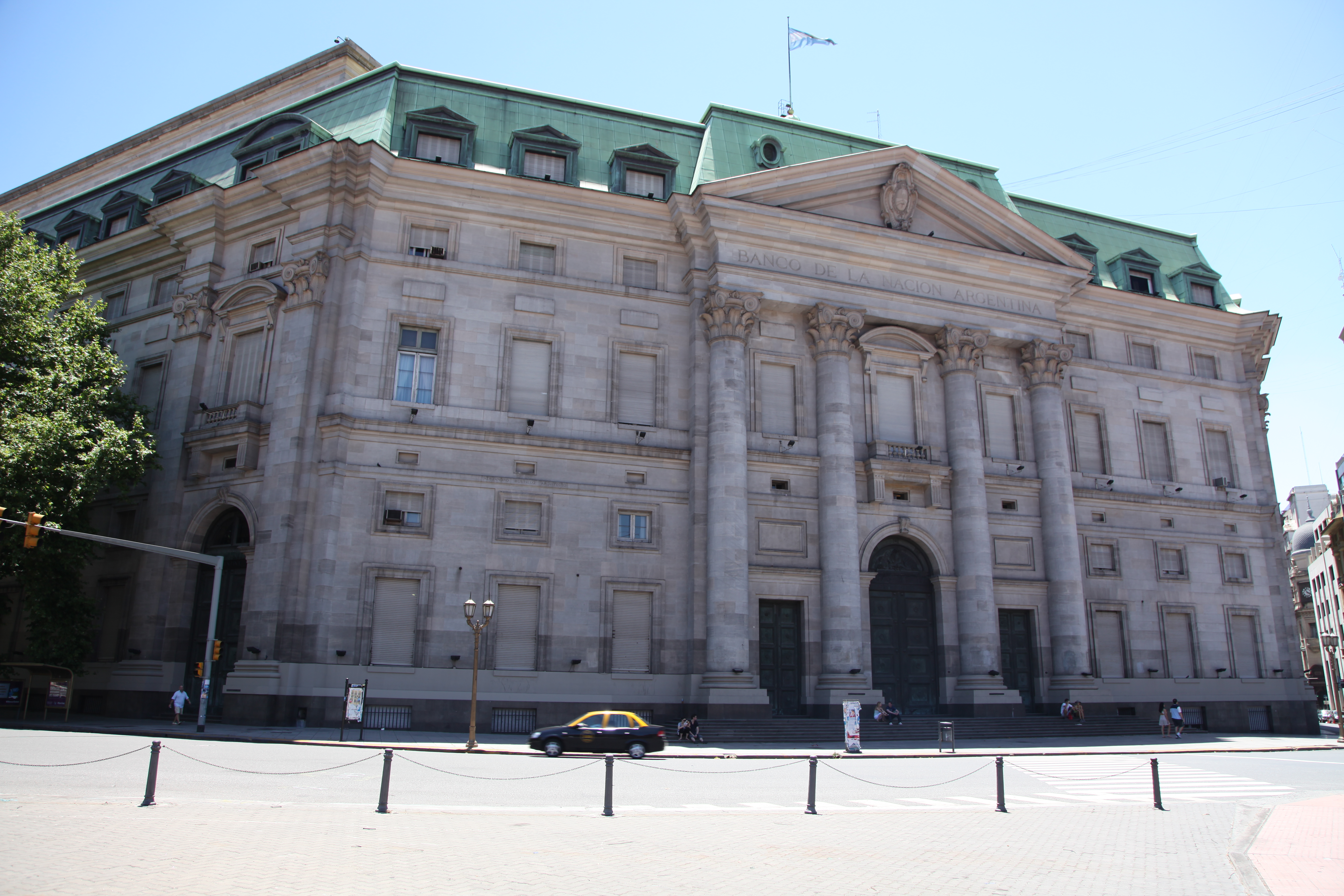
Headquarters of the Banco Nación in Buenos Aires.

The IBM and Banco Nación case is a corruption case in Argentina, in which the local subsidiary of the American company IBM bribed officials of the Bank of the Argentine Nation, in order to obtain the contract to computerize the bank for an amount of 250 million dollars. Daniel Santoro, Técnicas de Investigación: Métodos desarrollados en diarios y revistas de América Latina, Fondo de Cultura Económica, 2004, 287 pages. ISBN 968-16-7241-0. IBM's parent company agreed to pay a fine in the United States for those bribes.

The case began in 1994, but by 2016 the trial had still not begun, which is why the court in charge of the case issued a ruling on 9 May 2016 accepting the defense of prescription (expiration of the action due to excessive time), acquitting all the accused. On 20 March 2017, Chamber IV of the Court of Cassation (Ana María Figueroa, Mariano Borinsky and Gustavo Hornos) reversed the ruling and ordered the trial to begin. On 12 June 2018, the Supreme Court annulled the ruling of the Court of Cassation and ordered it to issue a new ruling. On 29 August 2018, the Court of Cassation issued a new ruling, once again reversing the ruling of the Oral Court, this time because it considered that the action was not time-barred and that therefore the trial had to be held.

==== The case ====
In the IBM and Banco Nación case (509/05), there came to be a total of 30 defendants charged over the act, spread among different companies, not only the implicated ones. The investigation was based on tender no. 60/93 called "Proyecto Centenario" from the years 1993 and 1994 concerning the computerization of Banco Nación with the Hogan system.

Although the cost for software stipulated between IBM and Banco Nación in 1994 was around 37 million dollars, of which 21 million were actually paid, for the 525 bank branches it would have a cost per branch of 70,476 dollars, a figure that was striking. It was compared with what the then Banco Río paid the company Consad between 1985 and 1987, 395,376 dollars for 300 branches, giving a cost of 1,318 dollars for each branch, in total 53 times less per branch. Another datum was the one agreed between IBM, through the company Consad, and Banco Credicoop in 1989 for 520 branches, set at 525 thousand dollars, including the initial license of 75 thousand dollars, resulting in a price per branch of 1,144 dollars, with the total being 62 times lower.

In April 1996, an attachment of one million dollars was placed on each of those considered co-authors of the crime in the case, among them IBM executives Martorana and Soriani; Héctor March; the Deloitte partner (the consultancy that advised Banco Nación on the purchase) Roberto Oneto; from IBM, Gustavo Soriani, Sales Director, and Ricardo Martorana, President; from the consultancy CONSAD: Marcelo Cattáneo and Julia Oshiro as Consad executives, among others.

In 2002, the Court of Appeals ruled: "Having demonstrated that the defendants whose situation has been dealt with herein did not participate in the crime investigated, the investigation having been exhausted, the Court RESOLVES: to confirm the appealed order insofar as it decrees the acquittals of José Augusto Salamanca, Gabriel Luis Murman, Héctor Neira, Eduardo Pedro Garese, Carlos Fabián Descalzo, Mónica Irene Lacoste, Ana María Noguiera, Anastasia Stenkowski and Haroldo Omar Bearsi, preserving the good name and honor they enjoyed.

"To understand how the irregular negotiation between IBM and Banco Nación took place, it is necessary to read the ruling like a novel. One has to reconstruct the plot of events from the prosecutions of Aldo Dadone, Alfredo Aldaco and Héctor March (directors of Banco Nación). Also, one has to understand how Gustavo Soriani (of IBM) operated for the hiring of a non-existent 'mule' system."

— Explanation by an appellate judge of Chamber I of the Federal Chamber about the ruling, 1996.

In addition, the appellate judges considered that Dadone, Aldaco and March formed a kind of triumvirate to negotiate with IBM while avoiding oversight by the other members of the board.

On 10 July 1996, while Judge Bagnasco was trying to clear the way for the investigation in New York so that the case could be brought before US courts, IBM's new president, Gueicaramburu, was received by President Carlos Menem and Domingo Cavallo, showing him the possibility that the company might leave the country because of "legal harassment".

In February 1998, five bank accounts located in Switzerland were confirmed in which more than 8 million dollars had been deposited, four of which belonged to former Banco Nación directors Alfredo Aldaco and Gerardo Contarese, and to the former president of the Banco de Inversión y Comercio Exterior (BICE), Jorge Antonio Aladio. Aldaco was a diplomat who worked with Juan Schiaretti in the period 1989-1990 and was Domingo Cavallo's undersecretary; it is said that he was a friend of Alberto Kohan; in 1991 he began to direct Banco Nación. Contartese was also linked to the former minister and came to have a personal relationship with President Carlos Menem. The money was sent to Switzerland through various companies based in Uruguay; among the 8 million, almost 4 million 400 thousand were transferred from Switzerland to Luxembourg, whose beneficiaries were unknown. In March it was said that the more than 4 million dollars remaining deposited in Banco Rotschild belonged to the Dadone brothers, who were Aldo Dadone, former president of Banco Nación and close to Cavallo, and Mario, who was also a bank director. But a few days later the version changed to say that the owner of that account was Guillermo Juan Hunt, the Argentine consul in São Paulo; Hunt would confirm in an interview that the account was his and that it was in the name of the firm Vesley, but that it had nothing to do with Proyecto Centenario or with the linked companies.

"I only know the PCs I have been using since 1983. As for software, I only know those used on personal computers. I do not know how to distinguish the differential characteristics of large computers of different brands, nor their particular features."

— Aldo Dadone before the Chamber of Deputies, 1998.

Before the Chamber of Deputies, Alfredo Aldaco would also testify in 1998, saying that Aldo Dadone "received instructions from the minister (Cavallo), and did nothing without consulting him", that the company Delloite was the one that recommended IBM, and that the former minister's brother, Jorge Cavallo, "presented himself as an IBM software supplier when he had never sold software".

Amid speculation over whether or not the money from the Swiss bank accounts would be returned, Michael Graber, the Geneva judge who lifted bank secrecy at the request of the Argentine courts, declared that as long as the Argentine justice system proved the commission of an illicit act by final judgment or by agreement between the parties, the money could return to Argentina. He also stated that Hunt had been linked to the bank accounts by mistake.

After a conversation between Geneva judge Graber and judge Adolfo Bagnasco, it was recognized that the amount deposited in the Swiss accounts was not 3 million dollars, but 6 million. That meant that the amount in the accounts was greater than what had initially been attached and that, had Bagnasco agreed to the request of the lawyers of the Uruguayan companies to return the money to Argentina, the 2.4 million whose ownership was unknown would have been released and could have been withdrawn from the Swiss accounts.

One of those who had a secondary role in the IBM-Banco Nación case was Marcelo Cattáneo, brother of Juan Carlos. Marcelo was believed to be in charge of delivering the envelopes containing the bribe money. What was striking about him was the way he was found hanged in an area of difficult access in the Río de la Plata belonging to the Federal Capital in October 1998. The courts classified his death as "induced suicide", believing that the victim had been threatened through his family's safety and that it was intended as a warning to those implicated in the case. Marcelo Cattáneo's widow said that he had been sent to be killed days before his statement before the courts, which could have compromised public figures. And an investigation by a newspaper stated that Cattáneo had been in the law office of Luis Dobniewski, his lawyer, and from there had made a telephone call to the Presidency of the Nation.

"This death shows that there is a real mafia. Marcelo Cattáneo had been placed in a position of great responsibility and he felt betrayed because of that."

— Alfredo Viqueira, Frepaso deputy, 1998.

=== Siemens AG bribery case ===
In 1994 Menem signed Decree 1310/94, as a consequence of which on 26 August 1996 a public tender was called to implement and operate a system of migration control and personal identification. Judge Garzón Funes suspended the tender on the grounds that both powers were exclusive functions of the National State, so delegating them to private companies posed a risk to national security, but his decision was overturned by the Court of Appeals.

==== The challenge to the tender ====
The Frepaso deputies Darío Alessandro and Juan Pablo Cafiero suspected that the tender had been tailor-made so that businessman Alfredo Yabrán would win it, but, according to them, the disrepute that surrounded him after he was implicated in the murder of photojournalist José Luis Cabezas forced the government to modify its strategy. In the unsuccessful requests for suspension of the tender that they submitted to the courts, the deputies objected that it was mandatory for identity documents to be delivered to people's homes - which increased their price - that they had to be renewed upon turning 30, and that the State assumed expenses that should have been borne by the successful bidder. They also criticized that because various tasks had been brought together in a single tender, the scale of the project meant that only a few companies could compete.

Although the government argued that the payment citizens would have to make to obtain the national identity document would finance the rest of the project, that was not accurate, since Siemens would also receive the fees for the migration procedures that were to be carried out (the company quoted 205.70 pesos for the application for residence admission or renewal), the printing of the electoral rolls ($11.90 per 5000 voters and one copy) and the procedures for DNI updating and change of address. With an electoral roll of no fewer than 23 million citizens, the company would charge about 5,500,000 pesos for printing, equivalent to the same amount in US dollars. As for the price of the DNI, the 1991 pre-agreement with the French state company Sofremi provided for a charge of seven dollars, whereas in the tender won by Siemens the maximum price was twenty-five dollars per document, plus value added tax (VAT), and it was finally awarded at 30 dollars including VAT and home delivery. At that time, the DNI made by the State cost the citizen 15 dollars and home delivery (optional) another 10 dollars. It was estimated that revenue over the six years would range between 600 and 900 million dollars and that it would constitute "a succulent business".

One of the losing consortia claimed that Siemens would collect 1.260 billion dollars for something that cost no more than 180 million, and that the DNIs for which between 30 and 40 dollars would be paid could not cost more than 3.50 peso-dollars of the time.

==== State guarantee ====
The signed contract provided for 24 million new documents to be issued in five years, but if that level was not reached the State had to pay severe penalties.

==== Suspected advice ====
Shortly before the participants' evaluations were made public, it became known that during the tendering process Siemens had received advice from former Justice Minister of the Menem government Rodolfo Barra, who also advised President Menem. Faced with the ethical questions raised at the time, the company replied that it had a legal department that assisted it but that it needed "special advice", and that Barra "was an adviser to the President on a very specific matter: the rights of the unborn, so he had no ethical impediment".

==== Surprise at the evaluation result ====
There was widespread surprise when in January 1998 it became known that in the technical evaluation carried out by the government the score awarded to group Itron (Franco Macri) (70%) - SHL Systemhouse Inc. (10%) - TWR System Overseas (10%) - Malam System (10%), made up of Ciccone Calcográfica, OCA, MCI, Supercom, Raytheon, Ceitech, Gabriel Álvarez and Hewlett Packard, which had been seen as the great favorite, was only 8.08 points in the technical and security rating, and 8.55 in the financial-management aspect, and was therefore surpassed by the group Siemens IT Services SA (99%), made up of Siemens-Nixdorf, Siemens SA, Printrak, Imaging Automation, Indra and Mailfast, with 9.19 and 8.91 points respectively. This placed Siemens as the virtual winner because, as the evaluated aspect represented 75% of the final result, the other group would have to submit an economic offer 5 or 6 pesos lower than that of its German competitor to reverse the positions. Malam's representative in Argentina and Macri's partner, Israel Lotersztain, did not hide his surprise and commented unofficially that the Government had praised during this time his experience in border control, and pointed out that the evaluation eliminated "all Israeli participation in the project and the company that will be in charge of border control is a German company (Siemens) with no experience in the matter". He stated that the evaluation was contradictory to the interest shown by the ruling party in controlling the border crossing of Ciudad del Este, in Paraguay, after the attacks on the Israeli embassy and the AMIA.

==== Beginning of implementation and change of government ====
On 6 October 1998, the government signed the contract with the German company, which three days later was ratified by Decree 1342/98 signed by President Menem. Siemens began to computerize some border crossings, update the electoral rolls and issue some DNIs; however, the latter had to be suspended in February 2000 when it was found that they had been improperly prepared: instead of the right thumb, the left thumb had been stamped on hundreds of documents and in some cases the photograph appeared inverted. The German company acknowledged the error, but saw behind that episode a maneuver involving the members of the two public agencies that had previously received part of the revenue (the National Registry of Persons and the Federal Police) and of the companies that had lost the tender.

In December 1999, the Radical Fernando de la Rúa, who had led the Alliance, assumed the presidency to replace Menem, whose term had ended, and found that the 2000 budget approved by the Justicialist administration did not provide the resources necessary to continue the contract, that is, the payment – at the regular rate – that the State had to make for the documents of those people who did not have the money to do so, a number estimated to correspond to more than 50% of the approximately 300,000 applications made annually.

=== Swiftgate ===
In December 1990, ambassador Terence Todman, of the United States, sent a note to the Argentine government in which he supported a complaint received from Swift meatpacking plant, which had complained about a request for a bribe. The journalistic scoop was by Horacio Verbitsky in the newspaper Página/12, on Sunday 6 January 1991, and continued for days. It prompted a response in person from the President of the Nation, who called them "journalistic criminals".

As a consequence of the resulting crisis, at the end of January 1991 the entire cabinet was forced to resign; presidential adviser Emir Yoma also had to resign his post, and Antonio Erman González left the Ministry of Economy in the hands of the foreign minister, Domingo Felipe Cavallo.

Diagram of the political scandal in Argentina, Swiftgate (1990)

=== Yomagate ===
The Yomagate was a political scandal that took place in Argentina in 1991, during the Menem government and implicating Amira Yoma (although she was later acquitted).

The Yomagate case investigated an alleged drug trafficking operation.

The case revealed, at least for public opinion, the power network that linked the judiciary (with the outstanding figure of then judge Servini de Cubría) and even censorship of television programs (as occurred in the iconic case of prior censorship/legal gagging of Tato Bores), among many others.

==== Implicated people ====
The Yomagate case implicated the hearings secretary (and also sister-in-law) of the then Argentine president Carlos Menem. Amira Yoma had to remain under preventive detention, which was revoked by the head of the Federal Criminal Chamber, Luisa Riva Aramayo.

Mario Caserta (secretary of Water Resources of the government, and Yoma's secretary) was sentenced to 5 years.
