= Carlos Bettini =

Argentinian businessman, politician, and diplomat

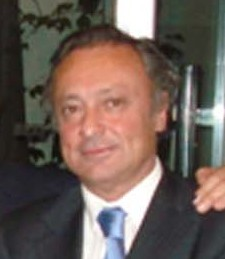
Carlos Bettini

Carlos Antonio Bautista Bettini Francese is an Argentine businessman, politician, and diplomat who was the Argentine ambassador to Spain and Andorra. In his youth he was a close friend of Nestor Kirchner and Cristina Fernandez de Kirchner, both of whom appointed him to the ambassadorship during their terms as president of Argentina. His appointment to this position was a matter of considerable controversy owing to his background as a lobbyist for Spanish businesses in Argentina.

Bettini, who was a member of the Montoneros, a militant left-wing group of the 1960s and 70s, has been accused of having committed a famous murder in 1976. Later his activities on behalf of Spanish interests caused him to face charges of corruption and bribery.

== Early life and education ==
Bettini was born on October 13, 1951, in La Plata, where his family was one of the best-known and wealthiest families in the city. In his youth he played rugby for a club called San Luis.

Bettini was a friend of Cristina Fernández when they were in their teens in La Plata. Some sources say that they were romantically involved. He knew Cristina five years before they both met Néstor Kirchner. His connections to both Kirchners became pivotal in shaping his political and diplomatic career.

In his early years, Bettini belonged to the Montoneros, a militant left-wing group of the 1960s and 70s and, according to some sources, was the principal perpetrator of the "ETA-style" murder of retired naval captain Jorge Bigliardi on a street in La Plata on June 12, 1976. It was said that Bettini was able to approach Bigliardi without arousing suspicion because they were friends. Bettini, who went by the alias Soldado Emilio, is said to have committed the crime in collaboration with his brother and another member of the Montoneros. Some sources indicate that his brother-in-law Jorge Devoto, another naval captain who lived in the same building as Bigliardi, was another proposed target for assassination by Bettini and his confederates.

Bettini's father, Antonio Bautista Bettini, was a federal prosecutor and a professor at several universities who was "disappeared" in 1977 during the military dictatorship. His brother, Marcelo Gabriel José Bettini, a student of agronomics, was "disappeared" in 1976; Jorge Alberto Daniel Devoto, a naval captain who was the husband of Bettini's sister Maria, was "disappeared" in 1977. Bettini's maternal grandmother, María de las Mercedes Hourquebie de Francese, was also "disappeared" in that year.

Bettini went into exile in Spain after the kidnapping of his family members. He received a law degree in 1986 from Universidad Complutense de Madrid in Spain.

== Career ==
=== Exile in Spain ===
In Spain, Bettini became a close friend and political and business ally of Felipe González, the longtime leader of Spain's Socialist Workers' Party. He also had business dealings with Mexican billionaire Carlos Slim, the richest man in the world. In addition, he is said to have befriended a circle of pro-Franco industrialists and members of the conservative Catholic group Opus Dei.

After Isabel Perón was released from Spanish prison and moved to Madrid, Bettini reportedly "approached her and won her confidence" and developed a close relationship with her, soon taking the place of Mario Rotundo, who had been in charge of the assets she had inherited from her husband. After he took over this role, Bettini reportedly was an "accomplice" of Argentine President Carlos Menem and Isabel Perón in the management of several funds.

From 1983 to 1993, he served as an advisor on foreign relations to the Spanish government Ombudsman, a position that during those years was held in turn by Joaquín Ruiz-Giménez Cortés, Álvaro Gil-Robles, and Margarita Retuerto Buades. He is said to have acquired this job thanks to the influence of González, who also arranged for Bettini to receive Spanish citizenship.

=== Return to Argentina ===
Returning to Argentina in 1991, Bettini served between 1993 and 1996 as the director of Aerolíneas Argentinas. During part of his tenure in this position, he also worked as a lobbyist in Argentina for Spanish companies. Spanish politician and union leader Ariel Basteiro called this "the period of greatest depletion" for the airline, explaining that under Bettini's control its interests shifted from Argentina to Spain, specifically toward the Spanish state airline, Iberia. According to Basteiro, Bettini promoted a business strategy for the airline that involved borrowing a hundred million dollars, selling real estate, equipment, and aircraft, and cutting back on services. The result was a significant loss of market share to Iberia.

During the presidency of Carlos Menem, he was a consultant in the Ministry of Justice under Jorge Maiorano, Rodolfo Barra, and Elias Jassán. He was the head of the cabinet of Attorney General Nicolás Becerra from 1998 until Becerra's retirement in February 2004.

From 1993 to 1996 he was also a member of the organizing committee for IDEA (Instituto para el Desarrollo Empresarial de la Argentina) and a member of Patronato de la Fundación Euroamérica. He was Argentina's representative to the annual meeting of the UN Commission for the Prevention of Crime in Vienna (1994,1995) and to an international conference of Ombudsmen in Wellington, New Zealand, in 1994.

In December 1999, Patricia Bullrich, then Minister of Corrections, filed a complaint against Bettini with federal Judge Jorge Urso for corruption, specifically for an attempt to bribe Bullrich herself, in connection with his alleged activity on behalf of a Spanish firm, Dycasa, that sought to secure a contract to build and renovate prisons in Argentina. Bullrich's allegations were studied by the Anti-Corruption Bureau, which suggested prosecuting him, at the very least, on the charge of inappropriate exercise of public functions. Although there was a raid on Bettini's office and a plan was apparently underway to prosecute him, it came to nothing. Proceedings against him were halted, and it was widely argued that this happened because of his high position and connections. It was noted in particular that Becerra, his superior, had close ties to Dycasa.

On June 2, 2001, Bullrich, then Minister of Labor, said in a television interview "that...no one had shown interest in the proposed privatization of Aerolíneas Argentinas" in 1990 and that "Carlos Menem had to personally call Felipe González to ask that Iberia do so." A report by a committee of experts who ruled that the proposal was unviable "economically and technically" was ignored.

At one point, Bettini also was the subject of a preliminary probe into charges of conspiracy, involving payments made to benefit the interests of the "Floating Casino" gambling boat.

=== Ambassador to Spain ===
Bettini became Argentina's Ambassador to the Kingdom of Spain and the Principality of Andorra on August 6, 2004. He served in this capacity under both President Néstor Kirchner and President Cristina Fernández de Kirchner.

His appointment as ambassador to Spain caused controversy because he had no diplomatic background and was viewed as a lobbyist for Spanish business interests in Argentina. Patricia Bullrich openly criticized his appointment, saying that it was inappropriate to appoint a lobbyist for Spain to the ambassadorship. Bullrich cited Bettini's alleged actions on behalf of Dycasa, and noted that he had been reported at the time to the Anti-Corruption Bureau. Bettini denied having ever worked as a lobbyist, and announced that he would file a complaint against Bullrich in response to her accusations. Opposition leader Elisa Carrio warned that if he was appointed ambassador, she would "file a criminal complaint for illegal appointment."

One source noted that although Bettini, upon being appointed ambassador to Spain, denied ever having been a lobbyist or representative for Spanish companies, stating that such activities would be inappropriate for a public official or diplomat, he had explicitly identified himself in 2000 as a lobbyist for Spanish business and political interests.

In a 2013 public address by Maria Bettini, the forced "disappearances" of the Bettini family members were used to contrast the terror and human-rights abuses of the military dictatorship with what Carlos Bettini himself, at that event, described as the benign human-rights policies of the Kirchners.

== Honors and awards ==
In 2004 the Kingdom of Spain awarded Bettini the Grand Cross of the Order of Isabel the Catholic, with the degree of Commendation. This award was viewed as a reflection of the closeness of Bettini's relationship with the Spanish Socialist Workers' Party.
