= César Jaroslavsky =

Argentine politician (1928–2002)

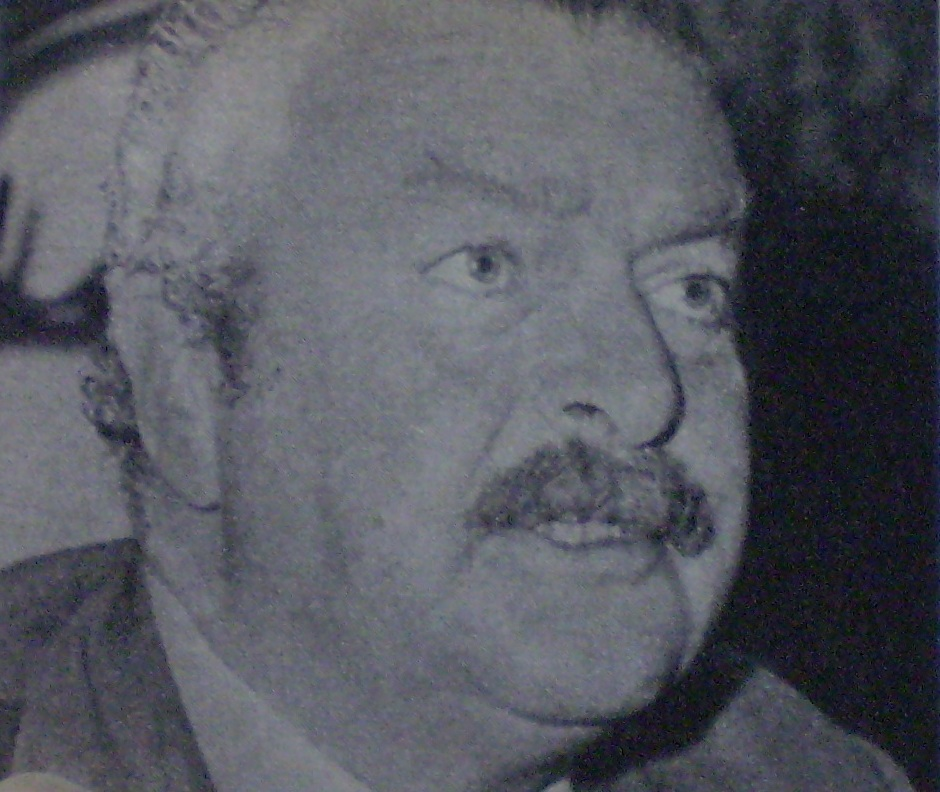

Personal details
- Born: César Jaroslavsky; 3 May 1928 Victoria, Entre Ríos
- Died: 7 February 2002 (aged 73) Buenos Aires
- Party: Radical Civic Union

César Jaroslavsky (May 3, 1928 – February 7, 2002) was an Argentine politician prominent in the UCR.

== Life and times ==
=== Early life ===
Jaroslavsky was born in Victoria, Entre Ríos Province, in 1928. His father, a wheat farm laborer, died in 1941, and the family moved to Buenos Aires, where César found work in a brick factory. He joined the centrist Radical Civic Union (UCR) in 1945, though the October 13 arrest of the UCR's chief rival, populist leader Juan Perón, prompted the young Jaroslavsky to join the historic October 17 protests for his release (Perón would go on to win the pivotal 1946 general elections).

Returning to Victoria, Jaroslavsky was a provincial swimming champion at age 20 and later that year, was elected President of the Entre Ríos chapter of the UCR Youth. A bank teller initially, he joined the editorial staff at the local news daily, La Mañana, in 1952. Assigned as secretary to UCR lawmaker Eduardo Laurencena, Jaroslavsky earned some prominence when Laurencena was appointed President of the Central Bank of Argentina, in 1956. He was elected to the Provincial Legislature of Entre Ríos in 1958, and re-elected in 1963.

Jaroslavsky displayed a contentious style in politics, early on: the granting of what he considered excessive salaries and stipends to Entre Ríos legislators led to his resignation from the body in 1965 (a 1966 coup d'état suspended that and all other legislative bodies in Argentina, as it happened).

The military regime's imminent call for elections led Jaroslavsky in 1972 to join the "Movement for Renewal and Change," Raúl Alfonsín's center-left alternative within the UCR to Ricardo Balbín's more conservative, mainstream ticket. Alfonsín's loss to Balbín in the primaries (and Balbín's loss to the Peronists in the 1973 general elections) caused Jaroslavsky's departure from active politics; Argentina, for its part, would be ruled by another dictatorship from 1976 to 1983.

=== A leader in the UCR ===
The failure of the last military dictatorship led to new elections in October 1983, and the election of Raúl Alfonsín to the presidency was accompanied by a UCR majority in the Lower House of Congress. Elected to Congress that year, Jaroslavsky was, in turn, elected Leader of the UCR Congressional Caucus - making him Majority Leader of the body.

Jaroslavsky was steadfast advocate of Alfonsín's policies while Majority Leader, and shepherded the ratification of the 1984 Beagle Channel Treaty with neighboring Chile, progressive divorce and spousal rights laws, and the President's controversial, 1986 plan to relocate the nation's capital to the small patagonian city of Viedma, which obtained Lower House passage in 1987 (though it failed to gain Senate approval).

An unprecedented financial crisis led to a loss of both the presidency and congress for the UCR in the 1989 elections, and it befell Jaroslavsky to lead negotiations with representatives of the victor, Carlos Menem, on June 15. Jaroslavsky had maintained good relations with Peronist lawmakers, however, and negotiations resulted in advancing Menem's inaugural by five months.

=== Later life ===
The UCR's losses in the 1991 mid-term elections and his own health problems led Jaroslavsky to retire from Congress, later that year. A spinal cord injury took him to Cuba, where he was visited by President Fidel Castro following surgery.

Continuing to promote an understanding with the opposition Peronists, Jaroslavsky in 1992 became the first prominent UCR figure to publicly support President Menem's call to amend the Argentine Constitution in favor of allowing presidential reelection. His support helped Alfonsín regain the party presidency in 1993 on the prospect of mutually beneficial negotiations with Menem. These ultimately took place in November and yielded the Olivos Pact, which granted Menem the right to seek reelection in exchange for reforms favoring the UCR.

Jaroslavsky lost his son, Juan Pablo, in a 1994 firing range accident. Taking part in the Constitutional Convention that August, he was brought on as campaign manager to the relatively inexperienced UCR presidential nominee, Governor Horacio Massaccesi. Following the UCR's defeat in the 1995 elections, Jaroslavsky retired from active politics. He authored a reflection on the defeat, Hay otro camino (There is Another Way), in 1996, and saw his daughter, María Gracia, elected to Congress in 1997.

César Jaroslavsky died of a heart attack in Buenos Aires in 2002; he was 73.
