= 1994 amendment of the Constitution of Argentina =

The 1994 amendment to the Constitution of Argentina was approved on 22 August 1994 by a Constitutional Assembly that met in the twin cities of Santa Fe and Paraná. The calling for elections for the Constitutional Convention and the main issues to be decided were agreed in 1993 between President Carlos Menem, and former president and leader of the opposition, Raúl Alfonsín.

== Constitutional Assembly election ==
On 10 April 1994 the conventional constituent elections were held. The Justicialist Party led by President Menem won the elections with 38.50% of the votes. Radical Civic Union came second with 19.74% votes, while two newly born forces each obtained 13%: the progressive peronist Broad Front, led by Carlos Álvarez, and the rightist Movement for Dignity and Independence, led by the carapintada military man Aldo Rico.

Out of a total of 305 constituents, the Justicialist Party obtained 137 representatives, Radical Civic Union 74, Broad Front 31, Movement for Dignity and Independence 21, Union of the Democratic Center 4, Socialist Party 3, Republican Force 7, Progressive Democratic Party 3 and various provincial parties 28.

== Ratification ==
The Constitutional Reform Convention was chaired by Osvaldo Mercuri of the Justicialist Party.

On 22 August 1994, after three months of deliberations in the cities of Santa Fe (traditional seat of constitutional conventions) and Paraná, the reform of 43 articles was finally approved in Santa Fe. The deliberations did not end without altercations; for instance, Monsignor Jaime de Nevares resigned his seat, claiming the convention to be "vitiated with absolute nullity".

== Main points ==
Amongst the most important points of the reform are:

- Argentina ratifies its legitimate and non-prescribing sovereignty over the Falkland Islands under Temporary Provisions.
- The international legislation on human rights, and every other international treaty ratified or to be ratified by Argentina, was deemed to hold an equal status to the Constitution as supreme law.
- The length of the presidential term was shortened from six to four years. The reelection of the president and the vice-president was allowed once consecutively, and the requirement for the president and vice-president to be Roman Catholics was removed.
- The presidential elections, formerly by the indirect vote of an electoral college, became a direct election, with a modified two-round ballotage system.
- The terms of senators were also shortened, from nine to six years. It was also established that every district was to elect three senators (up from the previous two) by direct elections (instead of being elected by provincial legislatures).
- The capital city, Buenos Aires, was given the special status of Autonomous City (Ciudad Autónoma), and its population was given the right to elect a Chief of Government (i.e. Mayor).
- The doctrine of de facto government was repealed, and it was established that any further attempt at breaking the constitutional order was to be deemed illegal, and severe penalties were to be established for the perpetrators and the right to resist a coup d'état was validated.
- The office of Chief of the Cabinet of Ministers was established, with the intention of attenuating the strong Presidential character of the Argentine government
- An independent institution, called the Judiciary Council (Spanish: Consejo de la Magistratura), was established with mandate to administer, regulate and control the functioning of the judiciary, to select the candidates for Federal Justices, and to initiate impeachments to depose them. It is composed of members from both houses of the National Congress, officials selected by the President, and representatives from the legal profession, judges and the academics.
- The issuing of Necessity and Urgency Decrees was regulated.
- An independent office, that of ombudsman, was created.
- A presidential candidate is no longer required to be a Roman Catholic.

== Other specific provisions ==
In order to provide an effective protection to individual rights, the 1994 amendment has introduced actions called: "amparo" (injunctions), "hábeas corpus", and "hábeas data". "Amparo" gives the possibility to any person to request that a judge declare the unconstitutionality of an act or ruling on which an action or omission of public authorities or private individuals is based that, in an actual or imminent manner, causes damage or restrains a right recognized by the Constitution, the law, or an international treaty. This action requires that no other effective judicial means be available. "Hábeas corpus" is an action that can be filled to protect the right of physical freedom when it is threatened, limited, modified, or injured, or in case of illegitimate aggravation of conditions of detention. "Hábeas data" is an action that can be filled by any individual to take notice of any information referred to him, registered in public or private registers, and to request its suppression, rectification, confidentiality, or updating.

Another innovation introduced by the 1994 amendment is the right of citizens to introduce bills before the House of Deputies that must be considered by Congress within the next twelve months. A further innovative provision is the recognition of the right of every inhabitant to a healthy environment in article 41 that establishes that

all inhabitants are entitled to the right to a healthy and balanced environment fit for human development in order that productive activities shall meet present needs without endangering those of future generations; and shall have the duty to preserve it. As a first priority, environmental damage shall bring about the obligation to repair it according to law. The authorities shall provide for the protection of this right, the rational use of natural resources, the preservation of the natural and cultural heritage and of the biological diversity, and shall also provide for environmental information and education. The Federal Government shall regulate the minimum protection standard, and the provinces those necessary to reinforce them, without altering their local jurisdictions. The entry into the national territory of present or potential dangerous wastes, and of radioactive ones, is forbidden.

Additionally, there are precise provisions referring to protection of consumers rights, defense of competition, control of natural or legal monopolies, and of public services' quality and efficiency.

== Members of the Constitutional Assembly ==
Among the convention members who defended the Pact of Olivos were the Peronists Augusto Alasino, Carlos Corach and Antonio Cafiero, and the Radicals Enrique Paixao, Jesús Rodríguez, César Jaroslavsky and Elisa Carrió.

The following are the people elected as convention members who formed part of the Constituent Convention that carried out the Argentine constitutional reform of 1994:

Surname and given names	District	Party
Abraham, Olga Catalina	Buenos Aires	Justicialist Party
Achem, Antonio	San Juan	Renewal Crusade
Acuña, Augusto César	Catamarca	Civic and Social Front
Aguad, Oscar Raúl	Córdoba	Radical Civic Union
Aguilar Torres, Luis María	Santa Cruz	Radical Civic Union
Aguirre, Mauro	Mendoza	Movement for Dignity and Independence
Alasino, Augusto José María	Entre Ríos	Justicialist Party
Albamonte, Alberto Gustavo	Buenos Aires	Justicialist Party
Alegre, Miguel Ignacio	Corrientes	Radical Civic Union
Alfonsín, Raúl Ricardo	Buenos Aires	Radical Civic Union
Alsogaray, Álvaro Carlos	Federal Capital	Union of the Democratic Centre
Álvarez, Carlos	Federal Capital	Broad Front
Amena, Jorge Daniel	Tierra del Fuego	Radical Civic Union
Ancarani, Hilda Norma	Buenos Aires	Justicialist Party
Andrade Muñoz, César G.	Tierra del Fuego	Popular Fuegian Movement
Araoz, Julio César	Córdoba	Justicialist Party
Arellano, María Cristina	Santa Cruz	Radical Civic Union
Arias, Joaquín Ignacio	Buenos Aires	Justicialist Party
Armagnague, Juan Fernando	Mendoza	Radical Civic Union
Arnold, Eduardo Ariel	Santa Cruz	Justicialist Party
Auyero, Carlos Alberto Camilo	Buenos Aires	Broad Front
Avelín de Ginestar, Nancy Barbarita	San Juan	Renewal Crusade
Azcueta, María Cristina	Buenos Aires	Radical Civic Union
Babbini, Bibiana	Formosa	Radical Civic Union
Baldoni, Hugo Domingo	Entre Ríos	Justicialist Party
Balestrini, Alberto Edgardo	Buenos Aires	Justicialist Party
Barberena, Juan Atilio	Buenos Aires	Justicialist Party
Barcesat, Eduardo Salvador	Federal Capital	Broad Front
Barra, Rodolfo Carlos	Buenos Aires	Justicialist Party
Barreiro de Roulet, Elba Pilar	Buenos Aires	Radical Civic Union
Bassani, Ángel Marcelo	Buenos Aires	Radical Civic Union
Battagion, Richard Gustavo	Mendoza	Democrat
Baum, Daniel	Neuquén	Justicialist Party
Bava, Pablo Juan Ángel	Buenos Aires	Movement for Dignity and Independence
Bello, Claudia Elena	Federal Capital	Justicialist Party
Benzi, María C. de Los Ángeles	Santa Fe	Justicialist Party
Bercoff, María Graciela	Córdoba	Radical Civic Union
Berhongaray, Antonio Tomás	La Pampa	Radical Civic Union
Bertolino, Enrique Antonio	Santiago del Estero	Justicialist Party
Biazzi, Ricardo Roberto	Misiones	Justicialist Party
Bogado, Floro Eleuterio	Formosa	Justicialist Party
Bonacina, Mario Héctor	Santiago del Estero	Radical Civic Union
Borini, Rodolfo Eduardo	Entre Ríos	Movement for Dignity and Independence
Bosio, Néstor Mario	La Pampa	Justicialist Party
Brassesco, María Inés	Buenos Aires	Broad Front
Bravo, Alfredo	Federal Capital	Socialist Unity
Bravo, Leopoldo	San Juan	Bloquist
Britos, Oraldo Norvel	San Luis	Justicialist Party
Brollo, Federico Guillermo	Neuquén	Neuquén People's Movement
Brusca, Vicente Mario	Federal Capital	Justicialist Party
Bucco, Jorge Luis	Córdoba	Justicialist Party
Bulacio, Rafael Alberto	Tucumán	Republican Force
Bussi, Antonio Domingo	Tucumán	Republican Force
Busti, Jorge Pedro	Entre Ríos	Justicialist Party
Caballero Martín, Carlos	Santa Fe	Progressive Democrat
Cáceres, Luis Alberto	Santa Fe	Radical Civic Union
Cafiero, Antonio Francisco	Buenos Aires	Justicialist Party
Cafiero, Juan Pablo	Buenos Aires	Broad Front
Cappelleri, Pascual	Buenos Aires	Radical Civic Union
Carattoli, Héctor Jorge	Buenos Aires	Radical Civic Union
Cardesa, Enrique Gustavo	Buenos Aires	Broad Front
Cardinale, Pablo Antonio	Santa Fe	Progressive Democrat
Carrettoni, Jorge Carlos	Buenos Aires	Radical Civic Union
Carrio, Elisa María Avelina	Chaco	Radical Civic Union
Casari de Alarcia, María L.	Córdoba	Justicialist Party
Casco, María del Carmen	Buenos Aires	Justicialist Party
Castillo Odena, Tomás E. R.	Corrientes	Liberal Autonomist Pact
Cavagna Martínez, Mariano A.	Buenos Aires	Justicialist Party
Ciaurro, Antonio	Santa Fe	Justicialist Party
Colombo, María Teresita del V.	Catamarca	Civic and Social Front
Conesa Monez Ruiz, Horacio E.	Jujuy	Republican Force
Corach, Carlos	Federal Capital	Justicialist Party
Cornet, Roberto Julio	Córdoba	Union of the Democratic Centre
Courel, Carlos Alberto	Tucumán	Radical Civic Union
Cullen, Iván José María	Santa Fe	Union of the Democratic Centre
Daher, Zulema Beatriz	Salta	Justicialist Party
Dalesio de Viola, Adelina	Federal Capital	Justicialist Party
De Bernardi, Eduardo	Chubut	Justicialist Party
De Jesús, Juan	Buenos Aires	Justicialist Party
De la Rúa, Jorge Enrique	Córdoba	Radical Civic Union
De Nevares, Jaime Francisco	Neuquén	Broad Front
De Sanctis, Guillermo Horacio	San Juan	Front of Hope
De Vedia, Enrique	Buenos Aires	Radical Civic Union
Del Castelli, Mario	Misiones	Radical Civic Union
Del Bono, Jorge Alejandro	San Juan	Front of Hope
Del Bono, Tulio Abel	San Juan	Justicialist Party
Del Campo, Carlos Alberto	Córdoba	Movement for Dignity and Independence
Del Castillo, Fernando Raúl	Buenos Aires	Movement for Dignity and Independence
Delich, Francisco José	Córdoba	Radical Civic Union
Dentice, Enrique Salvador	Buenos Aires	Movement for Dignity and Independence
Di Landro, Oscar Jorge	Buenos Aires	Justicialist Party
Di Tulio, Héctor Horacio	Santa Cruz	Radical Civic Union
Díaz, Rodolfo Alejandro	Mendoza	Justicialist Party
Díaz Araujo, Edgardo Alberto	Mendoza	Justicialist Party
Díaz Giménez, Héctor Antonio	Catamarca	Justicialist Party
Díaz Lozano, Julio César	Tucumán	Justicialist Party
Dressino, Ana María	Córdoba	Radical Civic Union
Dubini, Isidro Ramón	Entre Ríos	Broad Front
Duhalde, Eduardo Alberto	Buenos Aires	Justicialist Party
El Bacha, Leticia	Buenos Aires	Justicialist Party
Elordi, María de Las Mercedes	Entre Ríos	Movement for Dignity and Independence
Escobar, Jorge Alberto	San Juan	Front of Hope
Escudero, José C.	Federal Capital	Broad Front
Espindola, Zulma Celina	Formosa	Justicialist Party
Estabillo, José Arturo	Tierra del Fuego	Popular Fuegian Movement
Estévez Boero, Guillermo E.	Santa Fe	Socialist Unity
Etchenique, Roberto Alejandro	Buenos Aires	Movement for Dignity and Independence
Fabio, José Domingo	Misiones	Justicialist Party
Falbo, María del Carmen	Buenos Aires	Justicialist Party
Falco, Domingo Julio	San Luis	Justicialist Party
Farías, María Susana	Buenos Aires	Justicialist Party
Feijoo Do Campo, María del C.	Buenos Aires	Justicialist Party
Felicevich, Sara Lía	Chubut	Radical Civic Union
Fernández de Kirchner, Cristina	Santa Cruz	Justicialist Party
Fernández Meijide, Graciela	Federal Capital	Broad Front
Ferreyra de Las Casas, Ignacio	Chubut	Radical Civic Union
Ficoseco, José Carlos	Jujuy	Justicialist Party
Figueroa, María Cristina	Salta	Radical Civic Union
Fonzalida, Nicolás Lázaro	La Rioja	Justicialist Party
Frontera, Rodolfo	Santa Fe	Movement for Dignity and Independence
Galarza, Edith	Neuquén	Broad Front
García, Daniel Oscar	Buenos Aires	Broad Front
García, Francisco Sixto	Chaco	Radical Civic Union
García Lema, Alberto M.	Buenos Aires	Justicialist Party
García Vda de Barroso, Ida G.	San Luis	Justicialist Party
Giacosa, Luis Rodolfo	Salta	Justicialist Party
Giordano, Evaristo José	Santa Fe	Justicialist Party
Gómez de Marelli, Nilda Mabel	Misiones	Radical Civic Union
González, Elsa Gladis	Chaco	Justicialist Party
González, Rafael Alfredo	Chaco	Justicialist Party
Gorleri, Horacio Carlos	Formosa	Justicialist Party
Guerrero, Antonio Isaac	Tucumán	Justicialist Party
Guinle, Marcelo Alejandro	Chubut	Justicialist Party
Guz de Equiza, Elba Rosa	Buenos Aires	Radical Civic Union
Guzmán, María Cristina	Jujuy	Jujuy Popular Movement
Guzmán, Ricardo Gaspar	Catamarca	Civic and Social Front
Harvey, Ricardo J. G.	Corrientes	Liberal Autonomist Pact
Hernández, Antonio María	Córdoba	Radical Civic Union
Hernández, Santiago Antonio	Río Negro	Radical Civic Union
Hernández, Simón Fermín	Catamarca	Civic and Social Front
Herrera, Humberto Antonio	Santiago del Estero	Justicialist Party
Hitters, Juan Carlos	Buenos Aires	Justicialist Party
Honcheruk, Atlanto	Chaco	Justicialist Party
Humada, Julio César	Misiones	Justicialist Party
Ibarra, Aníbal	Federal Capital	Broad Front
Insfran, Gildo	Formosa	Justicialist Party
Iriarte, Luis	Tucumán	Republican Force
Iribarne, Alberto J. B.	Federal Capital	Justicialist Party
Irigoyen, Roberto Osvaldo	Buenos Aires	Radical Civic Union
Iturraspe, Juan Bernardo	Santa Fe	Justicialist Party
Jándula, Jorge Eduardo	Salta	Movement for Dignity and Independence
Jaroslavsky, César	Federal Capital	Radical Civic Union
Juañuk, Emilia Itatí	Misiones	Justicialist Party
Kammerath, Germán Luis	Córdoba	Union of the Democratic Centre
Kent, María del Pilar	Catamarca	Justicialist Party
Kesselman, Pedro J.	Federal Capital	Broad Front
Kirchner, Néstor Carlos	Santa Cruz	Justicialist Party
La Porta, Norberto L.	Federal Capital	Socialist Unity
La Rosa, Carlos Salvador	Mendoza	Justicialist Party
Larreguy, Carlos Alberto	Río Negro	Justicialist Party
Leiva, Rina Martha	Buenos Aires	Broad Front
Lipszyc, Cecilia Norma	Federal Capital	Broad Front
Llamosas, Esteban Miguel	Córdoba	Justicialist Party
Llano, Gabriel Joaquín	Mendoza	Democrat
Llaver, Santiago Felipe	Mendoza	Radical Civic Union
Lludgar, Rosa Emilia	Santiago del Estero	Radical Civic Union
López de Zavalía, Fernando J.	Tucumán	Republican Force
Lorenzo, Carlos Alberto	Santa Fe	Radical Civic Union
Lucero, María Zunilda	San Luis	Radical Civic Union
Luna, Julio Alberto	La Rioja	Radical Civic Union
Maeder, Ernesto Joaquín	Chaco	Chaco Action
Maestro, Carlos	Chubut	Radical Civic Union
Manfredotti, Carlos	Tierra del Fuego	Justicialist Party
Maqueda, Juan Carlos	Córdoba	Justicialist Party
Marcolini, Nora María	Chubut	Radical Civic Union
Marcone, Hugo Dante O.	Jujuy	Republican Force
Marín, Claudio Miguel Ángel	Misiones	Radical Civic Union
Marín, Rubén Hugo	La Pampa	Justicialist Party
Márquez, Pablo Antonio	Mendoza	Justicialist Party
Martínez, Esteban	Tierra del Fuego	Justicialist Party
Martínez, María de Las Mercedes	Formosa	Justicialist Party
Martínez Llano, José Rodolfo	Corrientes	Justicialist Party
Martínez Sameck, Pablo E.	Buenos Aires	Broad Front
Martino de Rubeo, Marta N.	Santa Fe	Justicialist Party
Marucco, Hebe Aurora	Buenos Aires	Justicialist Party
Masnatta, Héctor	Buenos Aires	Justicialist Party
Massaccesi, Horacio	Río Negro	Radical Civic Union
Matilla, José	La Pampa	Justicialist Party
May Zubiría, Diego	Federal Capital	Broad Front
Mayans, María Susana	Jujuy	Justicialist Party
Maza, Norma Beatriz	Santiago del Estero	Justicialist Party
Mazzeo, Iris Artemisia	Buenos Aires	Movement for Dignity and Independence
Meana García, María Nelly	Río Negro	Radical Civic Union
Melo de la Barba Susana Beatriz	Entre Ríos	Radical Civic Union
Méndez, María T.	Tierra del Fuego	Justicialist Party
Menem, Eduardo	La Rioja	Justicialist Party
Mercado Luna, Ricardo Gastón	La Rioja	Radical Civic Union
Merlo, Mario Raúl	San Luis	Justicialist Party
Mestre, Ramón Bautista	Córdoba	Radical Civic Union
Míguez Bonino, José	Federal Capital	Broad Front
Miranda, Julio Antonio	Tucumán	Justicialist Party
Moine, Mario Armando	Entre Ríos	Justicialist Party
Molina, Pedro Eustacio	Santa Cruz	Justicialist Party
Montes de Oca, Luis G.	Buenos Aires	Broad Front
Moreno, Ricardo María Diego	Catamarca	Justicialist Party
Muruzabal, Hilario Raúl	Buenos Aires	Movement for Dignity and Independence
Musalem, Alfredo	Salta	Justicialist Party
Natale, Alberto Adolfo	Santa Fe	Progressive Democrat
Navarro, Argentino Miguel	Misiones	Movement for Dignity and Independence
Nuñez, José Luis	Buenos Aires	Movement for Dignity and Independence
Oliveira, Alicia	Federal Capital	Broad Front
Olmedo, Mario Antonio	Formosa	Radical Civic Union
Olsina, María Luján	Mendoza	Justicialist Party
Orsi, René Saúl	Buenos Aires	Justicialist Party
Ortega, Ramón Bautista	Tucumán	Justicialist Party
Ortemberg, Raquel Elisa	Buenos Aires	Justicialist Party
Ortiz, Jorge Oscar	La Pampa	Movement for Dignity and Independence
Ortiz Pellegrini, Miguel Ángel	Córdoba	Radical Civic Union
Paixao, Enrique	Buenos Aires	Radical Civic Union
Pando, Ana María	Corrientes	Liberal Autonomist Pact
Pardo, Ángel Francisco	Corrientes	Justicialist Party
Parente, Rodolfo Miguel	Entre Ríos	Radical Civic Union
Péculo, Alfredo	Buenos Aires	Justicialist Party
Pedersoli, Juan Mario	Buenos Aires	Justicialist Party
Peltier, Teresa Camila	Mendoza	Democrat
Peña, Daniel Alberto	Federal Capital	Justicialist Party
Perette, Pedro	Entre Ríos	Radical Civic Union
Pettigiani, Eduardo Julio	Buenos Aires	Justicialist Party
Picinato, José Alejandro	Santiago del Estero	Radical Civic Union
Piccinini, Alberto José	Santa Fe	Broad Front
Pierri, Alberto Reinaldo	Buenos Aires	Justicialist Party
Pitte de Landa, María A.	Tucumán	Republican Force
Pizzurno, Ana María	Buenos Aires	Broad Front
Ponce de León, Rodolfo O. J.	Río Negro	Justicialist Party
Pontussi, Ennio Pedro	Salta	Renewal
Pose, Guillermo Alfredo	Mendoza	Democrat
Prieto, Hugo Nelson	Neuquén	Radical Civic Union
Puchmuller, Alberto Francisco	San Luis	Radical Civic Union
Puerta, Federico Ramón	Misiones	Justicialist Party
Puiggros, Adriana Victoria	Federal Capital	Broad Front
Quiroga Lavie, Humberto	Buenos Aires	Radical Civic Union
Raijer, Beatriz Irma	Córdoba	Justicialist Party
Rampi, Pascual Ángel	Buenos Aires	Justicialist Party
Rébora, Luis Armando	Córdoba	Broad Front
Regazzoli, Zelmira Mireya	La Pampa	Justicialist Party
Repetto, Víctor Roberto	Santa Fe	Movement for Dignity and Independence
Reutemann, Carlos Alberto	Santa Fe	Justicialist Party
Revidatti, Gustavo A.	Corrientes	Liberal Autonomist Pact
Rico, Aldo	Buenos Aires	Movement for Dignity and Independence
Robles, Miguel Ángel	Santa Fe	Justicialist Party
Rocamora, Alberto Luis	Buenos Aires	Justicialist Party
Rocha de Feldman, Dora	Chubut	Justicialist Party
Rodríguez, Jesús	Federal Capital	Radical Civic Union
Rodríguez de Tappata, Anahí Silvia	Río Negro	Justicialist Party
Rodríguez Saa, Adolfo	San Luis	Justicialist Party
Rodríguez Sañudo, Hugo B.	Santa Fe	Justicialist Party
Romero, Juan Carlos	Salta	Justicialist Party
Romero, Nilda	Buenos Aires	Radical Civic Union
Romero Feris, José A.	Corrientes	Liberal Autonomist Pact
Roque, Blanca Lelya	Córdoba	Radical Civic Union
Rosatti, Horacio Daniel	Santa Fe	Justicialist Party
Rovagnati, Dina Beatriz	Buenos Aires	Movement for Dignity and Independence
Rubio de Mingorance, Elena	Tierra del Fuego	Popular Fuegian Movement
Rufeil, José Tanus	Córdoba	Justicialist Party
Russo, Federico Pedro	Buenos Aires	Justicialist Party
Sachs de Repetto, Dora H. N.	Federal Capital	Radical Civic Union
Salazar, Evangelina	Tucumán	Justicialist Party
Salazar, Víctor Hugo	Federal Capital	Radical Civic Union
Salcedo, Carmen Inés	Buenos Aires	Justicialist Party
Salinas, Isabel Marta	La Rioja	Justicialist Party
Salum, Humberto Elías	Jujuy	Radical Civic Union
Sánchez de De María, Susana B.	La Pampa	Radical Civic Union
Sánchez García, María V.	Buenos Aires	Broad Front
Santander, Mario Armando	La Rioja	Justicialist Party
Sapag, Luz María	Neuquén	Neuquén People's Movement
Saravia Toledo, Fernando	Salta	Renewal
Schiavoni, Domingo José	Santiago del Estero	Justicialist Party
Schiavoni, Ester Aída	Neuquén	Justicialist Party
Schiuma, Stela Maris	Buenos Aires	Movement for Dignity and Independence
Schroder, Juan	Buenos Aires	Broad Front
Sequeiros, Néstor Adrián	Buenos Aires	Movement for Dignity and Independence
Serra, José María	Santa Fe	Broad Front
Serrat, Teresita Beatriz	Entre Ríos	Justicialist Party
Servini García, Clara C.	Buenos Aires	Justicialist Party
Skidelski, Carlos Rubén	Chaco	Justicialist Party
Solanas, Fernando "Pino"	Buenos Aires	Broad Front
Spina, Carlos Guido	Santa Fe	Radical Civic Union
Stephan, Sergio	Jujuy	Jujuy Popular Movement
Tizon, Héctor Eduardo	Jujuy	Radical Civic Union
Torres Molina, Ramón	Buenos Aires	Broad Front
Valdés, Eduardo Félix	Federal Capital	Justicialist Party
Vallejos, María Cristina	Buenos Aires	Justicialist Party
Varese, Luis Segundo	San Juan	Renewal Crusade
Vásquez, Alejandro Jorge	Federal Capital	Movement for Dignity and Independence
Vega de Terrones, Ana María	Salta	Renewal
Velarde, Marta Sylvia	Santiago del Estero	Justicialist Party
Verani, Pablo	Río Negro	Radical Civic Union
Viudes, Isabel Josefa	Corrientes	Justicialist Party
Viviant, Alfredo Ramón	Buenos Aires	Justicialist Party
Viyerio, Eduardo Alfredo	Chaco	Radical Civic Union
West, Mariano Federico	Buenos Aires	Justicialist Party
Winter, Jorge Enrique	Chaco	Chaco Action
Yoma, Jorge Raúl	La Rioja	Justicialist Party
Zaffaroni, Eugenio R.	Federal Capital	Broad Front
Zavalía, José Luis	Santiago del Estero	Radical Civic Union

== Controversy over the partial unconstitutionality of the reform ==
Various objections have been raised to the 1994 constitutional reform. The most institutionally significant is the declaration of partial nullity of the Constitution, issued in the cases of Supreme Court members Carlos Fayt (1999) and Elena Highton de Nolasco (2017), resolved by the Supreme Court in the first case, and in the second by a court of first instance in a final ruling, due to the lack of appeal by the State. In both cases, the Judiciary held that the constitutional reform establishing the age limit for judges at 75 years (art. 99, subsection 4) was unconstitutional and absolutely null, because Law No. 24,309, which declared the need for reform, did not authorize the modification of the lifetime tenure of judges.The "Fayt" and "Highton de Nolasco" cases opened the possibility that other provisions of the Constitution could be declared unconstitutional by judges.Another line of objections to the constitutional reform focused on the alleged unconstitutionality of Article 2 of Law No. 24,309, which declared the need for reform, where the Core of Basic Agreements was established, due to the requirement that it had to be approved or rejected as a whole, without the constituent convention members being able to modify its content. This challenge had two notable expressions, with objections presented by convention members José Antonio Romero Feris (conservative) and Héctor Polino (socialist).
