= Alberto Piccinini =

Alberto Piccinini may refer to:

- Alberto Piccinini (footballer) (1923-1972), Italian footballer
- Alberto Piccinini (politician) (1942-2021), Argentine politician
