= Ballotage in Argentina =

Version of the two-round electoral system used in Argentina since 1994

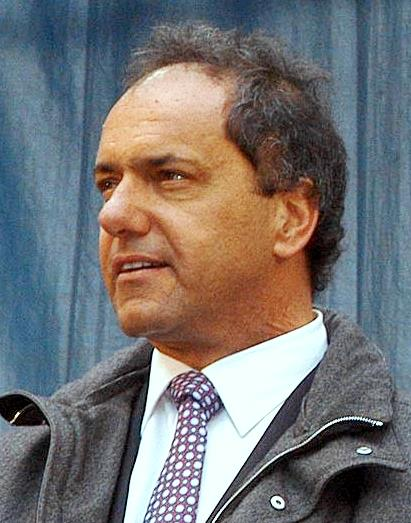
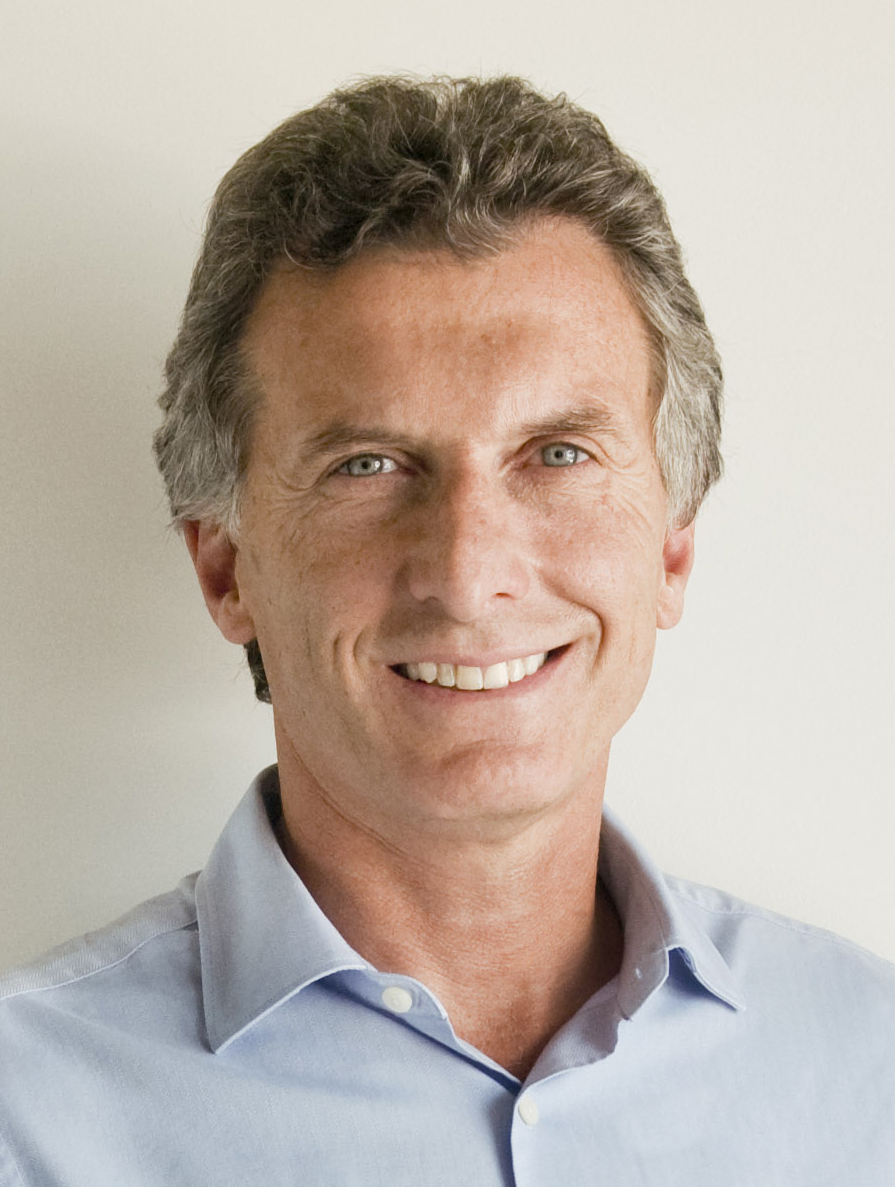
Daniel Scioli and Mauricio Macri had a ballotage in the 2015 presidential elections, which was won by Macri.

In Argentina, presidential elections are conducted under the ballotage system. This system was added by the 1994 amendment to the Constitution of Argentina, as part of the negotiations between former president Raúl Alfonsín and president Carlos Menem.

Most countries with a two-round system require a candidate to win at least 50 percent of the vote to win the presidency in a single round. In these cases, if no candidate reaches that threshold, a runoff is held between the top two candidates in the first round. In Argentina a candidate can win a first-round victory with at least over 45 percent of the vote, or with at least 40 percent of the vote and at least more than 10 percentage points more than the runner-up. Lower-level Argentine districts, such as the city of Buenos Aires, use the conventional two-round voting system.

Since the amended constitution took effect, as of 2023 only two elections required a ballotage. The 2015 elections required a second ballot. FPV candidate and Buenos Aires Province Governor Daniel Scioli led the field in the first round, but finished with only 37 percent of the vote, three percentage points ahead of opposition leader and Buenos Aires Mayor Mauricio Macri's 34 percent. In the first runoff ever held for an Argentine presidential election, Macri narrowly defeated Scioli, winning 51.34% of the votes to Scioli's 48.66%.
