= 1993 Argentine legislative election =

- 3 October 1993
- 127 of the 257 seats in the Chamber of Deputies
- Turnout: 80.33%
Party	Vote %	Seats	+/–
Justicialist Party	43.47	66	0
Radical Civic Union	30.23	41	−1
Movement for Dignity and Independence	5.78	4	New
Broad Front	3.88	3	New
Union of the Democratic Centre	2.66	1	
Socialist Unity	2.50	2	+2
Republican Force	1.39	1	−1
Democratic Progressive Party	1.32	1	
Autonomist–Liberal Pact	1.11	2	+1
Chaco Action	0.77	1	+1
Salta Renewal Party	0.74	1	
Democratic Party	0.69	1	
Neuquén People's Movement	0.34	1	0
Jujuy People's Movement	0.28	1	New
Fuegian People's Movement	0.05	1	+1
This lists parties that won seats. See the complete results below.

Legislative elections were held in Argentina on 3 October. Voter turnout was 80%.

== Background ==
Success during the 1991 mid-term elections had encouraged President Carlos Menem to approve accelerated plans for privatizations, business deregulation, and more flexible labor laws proposed by the man widely credited for his political "summer," Economy Minister Domingo Cavallo. 1992 was a banner year for the Argentine economy, which grew 9% amid a 40% jump in fixed investment and doubling of auto sales; indeed, it had been the first year since 1984 in which spending on construction and machinery exceeded depreciation (many Argentines bought their first automobile since at least then, as well).

Storm clouds were never far from Menem's political summer skies, however. An exposé on growing corruption published by muckraking journalist Horacio Verbitsky led to the resignation of Menem's chief strategist, Interior Minister José Luis Manzano, and to that of a key ally, Buenos Aires Mayor Carlos Grosso. Continuing economic uncertainty in the United States, Europe and Japan helped lead to an unexpected crisis of confidence in Argentina, as well and, though the nation's healthy foreign exchange reserves easily thwarted a November 1992 run on the Argentine peso, the event helped trigger a sudden slowdown in Cavallo's "Argentine miracle." This negative economic turn was made all the more inopportune by the coinciding wave of layoffs on the heels of mass privatizations of large employers, such as the state oil concern YPF and the nation's vast railways. Unemployment, which had remained at around 7% during the 1991-92 boom, leapt to nearly 10% by mid-1993.

Concern over layoffs, the future of the newly privatized companies and over reforms to the relatively generous adjustable pensions system inherited from populist leader Juan Perón's heyday dominated voters' issues ahead of the October 3, 1993, mid-term elections. Ultimately, fears of a recession during 1993 did not materialize and Menem quickly translated still-rising federal revenues (as well as US$3.5 billion in income from the sale of YPF stock) to increased spending on pensions and public works, helping calm protest. Sensing an opportunity to reform Argentina's arcane electoral system, the new Interior Minister, Gustavo Béliz, proposed a replacement of the nation's system of electoral lists for one resembling an Australian ballot. The proposed reform, which would lessen party leaders' influence over the process, helped result in his dismissal, however. President Menem's Justicialist Party enjoyed fourth-straight electoral victory, picking up several seats in Congress, though the struggling Radical Civic Union (UCR, which had held power during Raúl Alfonsín's difficult 1983-89 tenure), averted a trouncing and retained its Congressional strength. The UCR even made inroads in traditionally Peronist Santiago del Estero Province, where discontent with a political machinery long dominated by Justicialist Party strongman Carlos Juárez had led to riots.

The results helped persuade both President Menem and UCR leader Alfonsín to negotiate towards a mutually beneficial arrangement, a month after the election. The victory encouraged Menem to pursue his goal of amending the 1853 Argentine Constitution to allow himself re-election. Alfonsín, whose party held the balance of power, accommodated the President, in exchange for increased representation in the Senate for the first runner-up (presumably the UCR) and the relinquishing of the Presidential right - enjoyed since 1880 - to appoint the Mayor of Buenos Aires (whose voters leaned towards the UCR). The consequent Olivos Pact made the 1994 reform of the Argentine Constitution along the agreed-upon lines a reality, making this the salient legacy of the 1993 legislative elections.

== Results ==
Party	Votes	%	Seats	
Party	Votes	%	Won	Total
Justicialist Party	7,112,922	43.47	66	129
Radical Civic Union	4,946,281	30.23	41	84
Movement for Dignity and Independence	946,310	5.78	4	7
Broad Front	634,720	3.88	3	3
Union of the Democratic Centre	435,093	2.66	1	5
Socialist Unity	408,517	2.50	2	5
Republican Force	227,727	1.39	1	3
Democratic Progressive Party	216,082	1.32	1	2
Autonomist–Liberal Pact	181,611	1.11	2	4
Chaco Action	125,597	0.77	1	2
Workers' Party	124,093	0.76	0	0
Salta Renewal Party	120,669	0.74	1	3
Democratic Party	113,528	0.69	1	1
Movimiento al Socialismo	58,705	0.36	0	0
Neuquén People's Movement	55,375	0.34	1	2
Federal Party	53,235	0.33	0	0
Jujuy People's Movement	45,369	0.28	1	2
Independent Christian Movement	45,295	0.28	0	0
Blockist Party of San Juan	36,533	0.22	0	1
People's Patagonian Movement	36,071	0.22	0	0
White Party of Retirees	35,778	0.22	0	0
Integration and Development Movement	32,431	0.20	0	0
Humanist Party	25,580	0.16	0	0
Independent Call	24,219	0.15	0	0
Labor and People's Party	22,685	0.14	0	0
Constitutional Nationalist Party	22,405	0.14	0	0
Free Homeland	22,320	0.14	0	0
Popular Alliance	20,348	0.12	0	0
Christian Democratic Party	20,267	0.12	0	0
Renewal Crusade	19,793	0.12	0	1
Buenos Aires Alliance for Growth	15,880	0.10	0	0
Homeland and People	15,384	0.09	0	0
Bases Movement	13,982	0.09	0	0
Chubut Action Party	12,972	0.08	0	0
Independent Reformist Movement	12,611	0.08	0	0
Buenos Aires Popular Movement	12,474	0.08	0	0
Fuegian People's Movement	7,972	0.05	1	3
Socialist Workers' Party	7,332	0.04	0	0
Autonomist Party	6,626	0.04	0	0
New Option	6,245	0.04	0	0
Independent Federalist Confederation	6,216	0.04	0	0
Catamarca Unity Front	6,162	0.04	0	0
Popular Action	5,673	0.03	0	0
Río Negro Provincial Party	5,536	0.03	0	0
Front for Advanced Democracy	5,418	0.03	0	0
Order and Justice	5,327	0.03	0	0
Participation Socialist Party	5,275	0.03	0	0
Front for Justice and Solidarity	4,807	0.03	0	0
New Party	3,387	0.02	0	0
Broad Front of the North	3,345	0.02	0	0
Ecologist Green Party	3,102	0.02	0	0
Mendoza Participation Front	2,991	0.02	0	0
Porteño Front	2,861	0.02	0	0
Social Justice	2,676	0.02	0	0
Corrientes Action	2,588	0.02	0	0
Center Party	2,453	0.01	0	0
Formosa Integrative Force	2,403	0.01	0	0
Salta Regional Movement	2,270	0.01	0	0
Democratic Change in Tucumán	1,999	0.01	0	0
Anti-Imperialist Popular Democratic Movement	1,805	0.01	0	0
Popular Line Movement	1,730	0.01	0	0
United People Front	1,298	0.01	0	0
Emancipatory Front	906	0.01	0	0
Total	16,361,265	100.00	127	257
Valid votes	16,361,265	94.89		
Invalid votes	180,590	1.05		
Blank votes	700,565	4.06		
Total votes	17,242,420	100.00		
Registered voters/turnout	21,463,761	80.33		
Source: Ministry of the Interior, DINE
