= Alberto Piccinini (politician) =

Argentine politician (1942–2021)

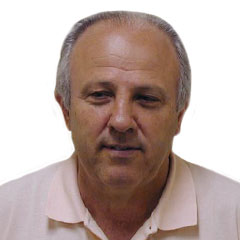
- Piccinini in 2004

Conventional Constituent of Argentina
- In office 30 May 1994 – 22 August 1994
- Constituency: Santa Fe Province

National Deputy
- In office 10 December 2001 – 10 December 2005
- Constituency: Santa Fe Province

Personal details
- Born: 9 May 1942 La Vanguardia, Santa Fe Province, Argentina
- Died: 13 May 2021 (aged 79) Rosario, Santa Fe Province, Argentina
- Party: Broad Front; PSA

Alberto Piccinini (9 May 1942 – 13 May 2021) was an Argentine politician. A member of the Broad Front and later the Authentic Socialist Party (PSA), he served in the Argentine Chamber of Deputies from 2001 to 2005.
