= Héctor Polino =

Argentine lawyer and politician (1933–2022)

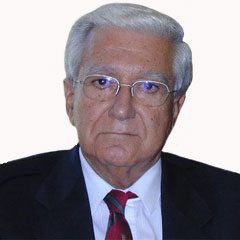
- Polino in 2001

National Deputy
- In office 10 December 1993 – 10 December 2005
- Constituency: City of Buenos Aires

Personal details
- Born: Héctor Teodoro Polino; 14 February 1933 Buenos Aires, Argentina
- Died: 18 September 2022 (aged 89) Buenos Aires, Argentina
- Party: Democratic Socialist Party (until 2002); Socialist Party (2002–2022)
- Education: University of Buenos Aires
- Occupation: Lawyer

Héctor Teodoro Polino (14 February 1933 – 18 September 2022) was an Argentine politician. A member of the Democratic Socialist Party and later the Socialist Party, he served in the Argentine Chamber of Deputies from 1993 to 2005.

Polino died in Buenos Aires on 18 September 2022, at the age of 89.
