= Carlos Corach =

Argentinian politician (born 1935)

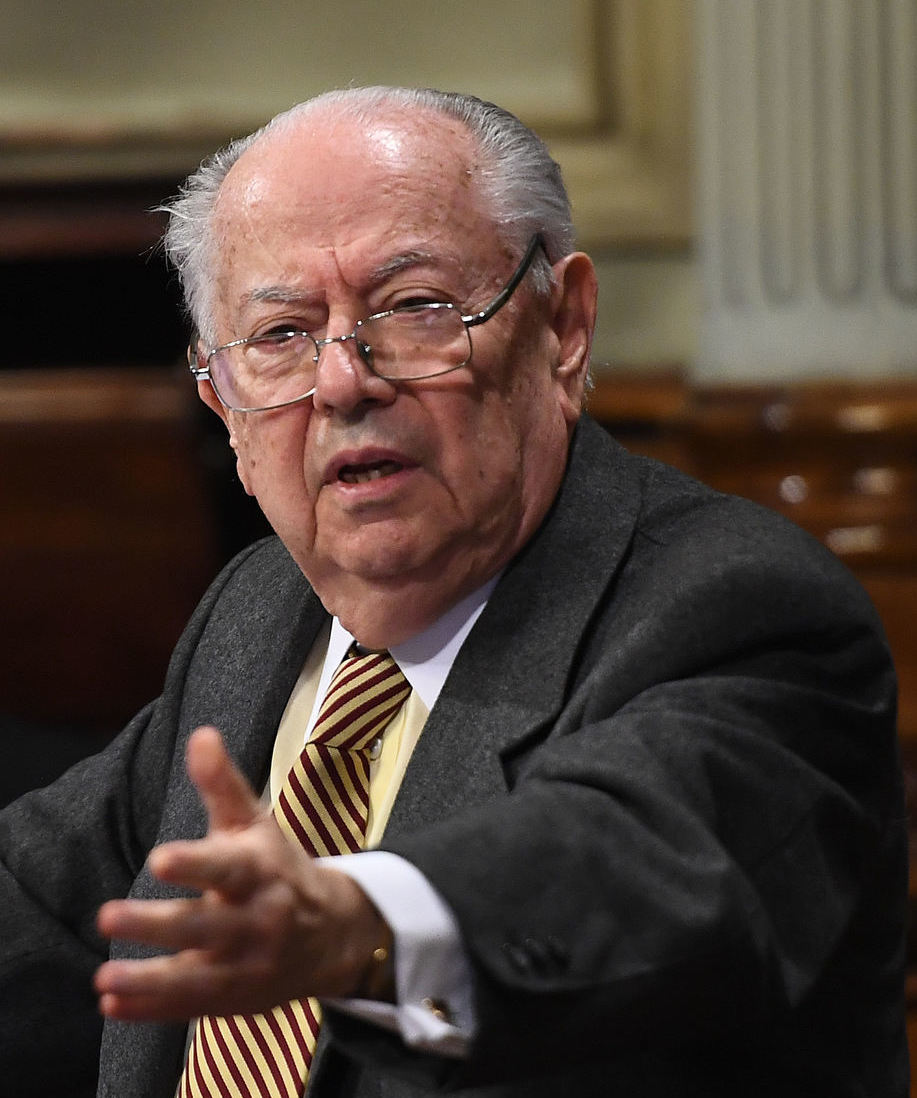
Carlos Vladimiro Corach in 1994

Carlos Vladimiro Corach (born 24 April 1935) is an Argentinian politician and lawyer, who served as Minister of Interior during the presidency of Carlos Menem between January 1995 and the end of tenure of Menem in December 1999.

== Career ==
=== Early political career ===
In 1961, he helped direct the Buenos Aires electoral campaign of Armando Turano for the Senate and Horacio Honorio Pueyrredón for the Chamber of Deputies; both were defeated by Alfredo Palacios and Carlos Adrogué. The following year, he was elected to the Buenos Aires City Council for the UCRI, but lost the seat shortly afterward when the military coup that overthrew President Arturo Frondizi dissolved legislative bodies. He later described his early anti-Peronist views during the conflict between Juan Perón and the Catholic Church as a deeply held belief shared across religious communities.

=== Minister of the Interior ===
Corach served as minister of the interior under President Carlos Menem from January 1995 until December 1999.

=== Later career and investigations ===
He was investigated for his connection with AMIA bombing. After Menem's presidency, he was National Senator in 1999 until 2001.

== Personal life ==
Corach is Jewish.

== See also ==
- Government of Argentina
- Military coups in Argentina
- Politics of Argentina
