= Pact of Olivos =

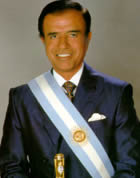
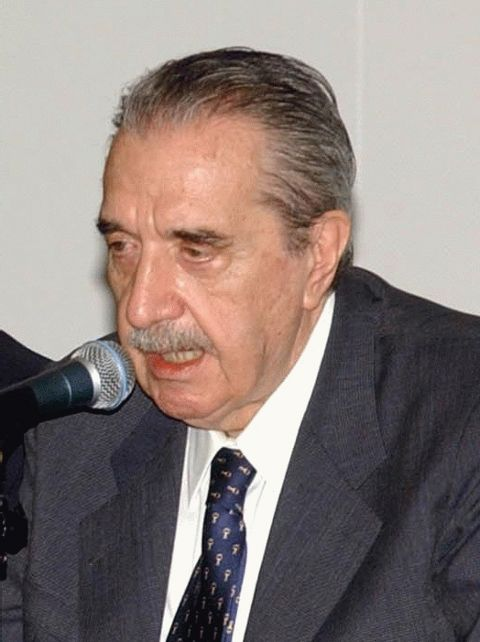
Carlos Menem (left) and Raúl Alfonsín (right) agreed a number of points for the 1994 amendment of the Constitution of Argentina

The Olivos Pact (Spanish: Pacto de Olivos) refers to a series of documents signed on 17 November 1993, between the governing President of Argentina, Carlos Menem, and former President and leader of the opposition UCR, Raúl Alfonsín, that formed the basis of the constitutional reform of 1994. These memoranda of understanding were signed in the official presidential residence, the Quinta de Olivos.

== Context ==
Raúl Alfonsín was the president of Argentina for the Radical Civic Union (UCR) from 1983 to 1989, and resigned during an economic crisis. Carlos Menem, from the Justicialist Party (PJ), was elected in 1989. The Convertibility plan ended the economic crisis and increased his popularity, allowing the PJ to win the 1991 and 1993 midterm elections. The presidential term of office was of six years, with no reelection. Menem sought to change that with an amendment to the Constitution of Argentina. For this he would require a supermajority of two thirds of both houses of the Argentine Congress. Although that was a feasible option at the Senate, it was a remote possibility at the Chamber of Deputies. Menem sought creative alternatives for that, such as a legal technicality that the requirement would be two thirds of the legislators present at the Congress during the session instead of two thirds of the complete body (and thus exploit circumstances where opposing legislators may be absent). Radical governors such as Carlos Maestro and Horacio Massaccesi commented that they would not oppose an amendment approved that way.

== Agreed terms ==
Political agents of Menem and Alfonsín met in secret and negotiated some points. Both leaders met personally in secret, on November 4, 1993. Alfonsín accepted to instruct the radical legislators to support the amendment, and allow presidential re-election for a single period. In exchange, the PJ agreed on a number of proposals by Alfonsín, to reduce the political clout of the president and ruling political party. The presidential term of office was reduced to four years. The Senate would be composed by two senators for the victor party at each province and one for the next party, instead of only a senator for the victor. The judges would be controlled by the Council of Magistracy of the Nation, a body that would include members of the opposition. The capital city of Buenos Aires, a federal district with a mayor appointed by the president, would become an autonomous administrative division with its own elected mayor; as a traditional anti-Peronist district, it was expected that such a mayor would be radical.

Menem, however, did not accept a turn into a semi-presidential system or even parliamentary republic, as proposed by Alfonsín. The proposed prime minister office was demoted into the Chief of the Cabinet of Ministers, a minister with higher political clout than the others, but still less than that of a prime minister. As a populist leader, Menem refused to give up the political clout of the presidential system. Menem also agreed to include a ballotage system, but with complex conditions.

== Consequences ==
Both parties gave their blessing to the pact. Congress approved it on December 29, 1993, and the executive power promulgated it the same day. This called for elections the following years, for members of the constituent assembly for the 1994 amendment of the Constitution of Argentina. The contents of the pact were approved, and Menem ran for and won re-election in the 1995 presidential election.
