= Rodolfo Barra =

Argentine judge and politician (born 1947)

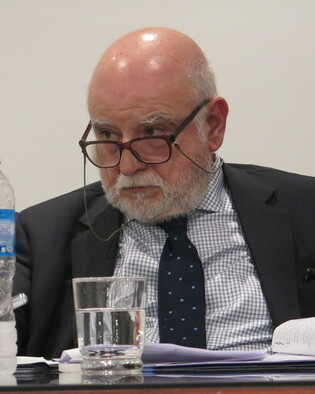
- Rodolfo Barra in 2016

Solicitor General of Argentina
- In office 10 December 2023 – 28 January 2025
- President: Javier Milei
- Preceded by: Carlos Zannini
- Succeeded by: Santiago Castro Videla

Minister of Justice
- In office 16 June 1994 – 10 July 1996
- President: Carlos Menem
- Preceded by: Jorge Luis Maiorano
- Succeeded by: Elías Jassán

Minister of the Supreme Court
- In office 25 April 1990 – 20 December 1993
- Appointed by: Carlos Menem

Personal details
- Born: Rodolfo Carlos Barra; 19 December 1947 (age 78) Buenos Aires, Argentina
- Party: La Libertad Avanza
- Other political affiliations: Tacuara Nationalist Movement (1960s); Justicialist Party
- Education: Universidad Católica Argentina
- Occupation: Lawyer

Rodolfo Carlos Barra (born 19 December 1947) is an Argentine far-right lawyer and politician, who served as a minister of the Supreme Court of Argentina between 1990 and 1993, and as Minister of Justice between 1994 and 1996, until his resignation for his links to groups related to Nazism, including the Tacuara Nationalist Movement. On 1 December 2023, president-elect Javier Milei announced that Barra had been selected as the Solicitor General. He served in this role until his resignation in January 2025.

== Early life and career ==
Barra was born in Buenos Aires on 19 December 1947. During his youth, he was part of the Nationalist Union of High School Students, a political group linked to the Tacuara Nationalist Movement, a movement that incorporated neo-Nazi elements. In 1996, he was forced to resign after a Noticias investigation linked him to this group. Furthermore, the paper Página 12 revealed he was arrested for an antisemitic terrorist attack on a synagogue. The Noticias investigation also revealed pictures of Barra performing the Nazi salute. He would later apologize for his political activities during this time, saying "if I was a Nazi, I regret it".

== Designation as Solicitor General of Argentina ==
On 2 December 2023, president-elect Javier Milei announced his designation as Solicitor General of Argentina (Procuración del Tesoro de la Nación), to become effective on 10 December 2023. His appointment caused outrage due to his neo-Nazi past.

He served in this role until 25 January 2025, when he handed over his resignation to the Ministry of Justice. The government officially accepted his resignation three days later, on 28 January 2025.
