= FSF =

FSF may refer to:

== Organizations ==
- Free Software Foundation, an American non-profit organization with a mission to promote computer user freedom
- Federal Security Force (Pakistan)
- Federación de Sindicatos Ferroviarios, a defunct Argentine trade union
- Financial Stability Forum, a defunct international organization of financial regulators
- Finlands svenska författareförening, the Society of Swedish Authors in Finland
- Flight Safety Foundation, an international independent, non-profit organization for research, education, and communications in the field of civil aviation flight safety
- Föreningen Sveriges Filmfotografer, the Swedish Society of Cinematographers
- Progressive Party, an Icelandic political party (in Icelandic: Framsóknarflokkurinn)
- Freiwillige Selbstkontrolle Fernsehen, German television rating content board.

== Arts and entertainment ==
- Folsom Street Fair, a street fair in San Francisco, California, United States
- Further Seems Forever, a rock band
- Fugitive Strike Force, a 2006 television series
- The Magazine of Fantasy & Science Fiction, also abbreviated F&SF
- Speculative fiction (genre) containing the subgenre of fantasy/science fiction (F/SF)
- Science fantasy (genre), a mixed genre of fantasy and science fiction elements
- Festival of Slovenian Film, an annual film festival in Portorož, Slovenia

== Sports ==
- Faroe Islands Football Association (Faroese: Fótbóltssamband Føroya)
- Federação Sergipana de Futebol, the Football Federation of Sergipe, Brazil
- Football Supporters' Federation
- Fuerte San Francisco, a Salvadoran football club
- Sahrawi Football Federation (Spanish: Federación Saharaui de Fútbol)
- São Toméan Football Federation (Portuguese: Federação Santomense de Futebol)
- Senegalese Football Federation (French: Fédération Sénégalaise de Football)

== Other uses ==
- Familial Shar Pei fever
- Females who have sex with females
- Fibrin-stabilizing factor
- Flexible Support Fund in the United Kingdom
- Fourth suit forcing, a bidding convention in the game of contract bridge
- Free speech fights, a series of 20th-century labor-related conflicts in the United States
- Full state feedback
