= Laurencena =

Laurencena is a Spanish surname. Notable people with the surname include:

- Eduardo Laurencena (1885–1959), Argentine politician
- Miguel Laurencena (1851–1928), Argentine lawyer and politician

== See also ==
- Laurence
