= 1922 Argentine general election =

2 April 1922
- Presidential election

376 members of the Electoral College 189 votes needed to win
- Registered: 1,586,366
- Turnout: 55.32%
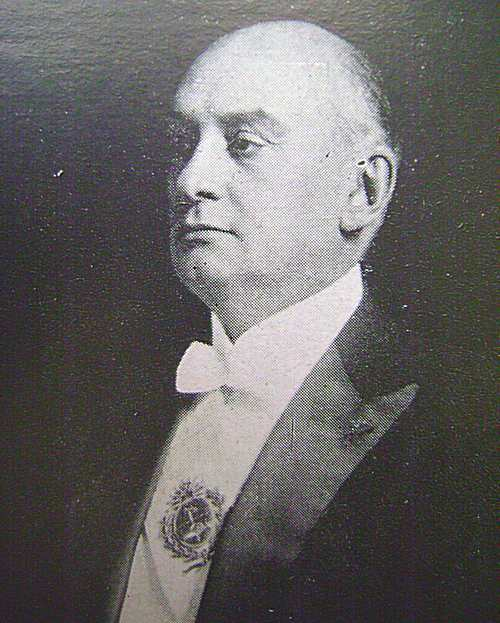

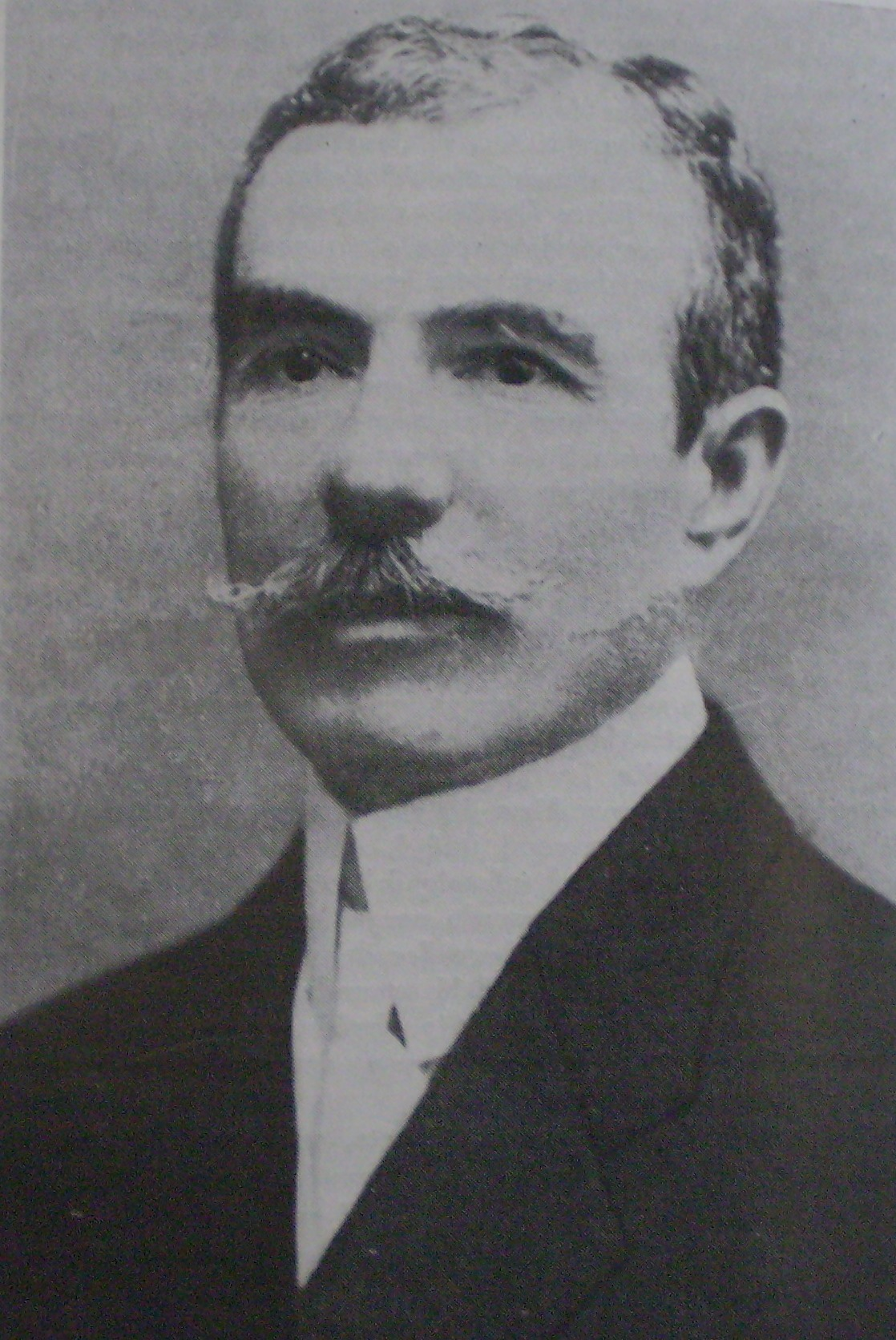
Nominee	Marcelo Torcuato de Alvear	Norberto Piñero
Party	UCR	National Concentration
Electoral vote	235	60
Popular vote	419,170	231,102
Percentage	50.49%	27.84%
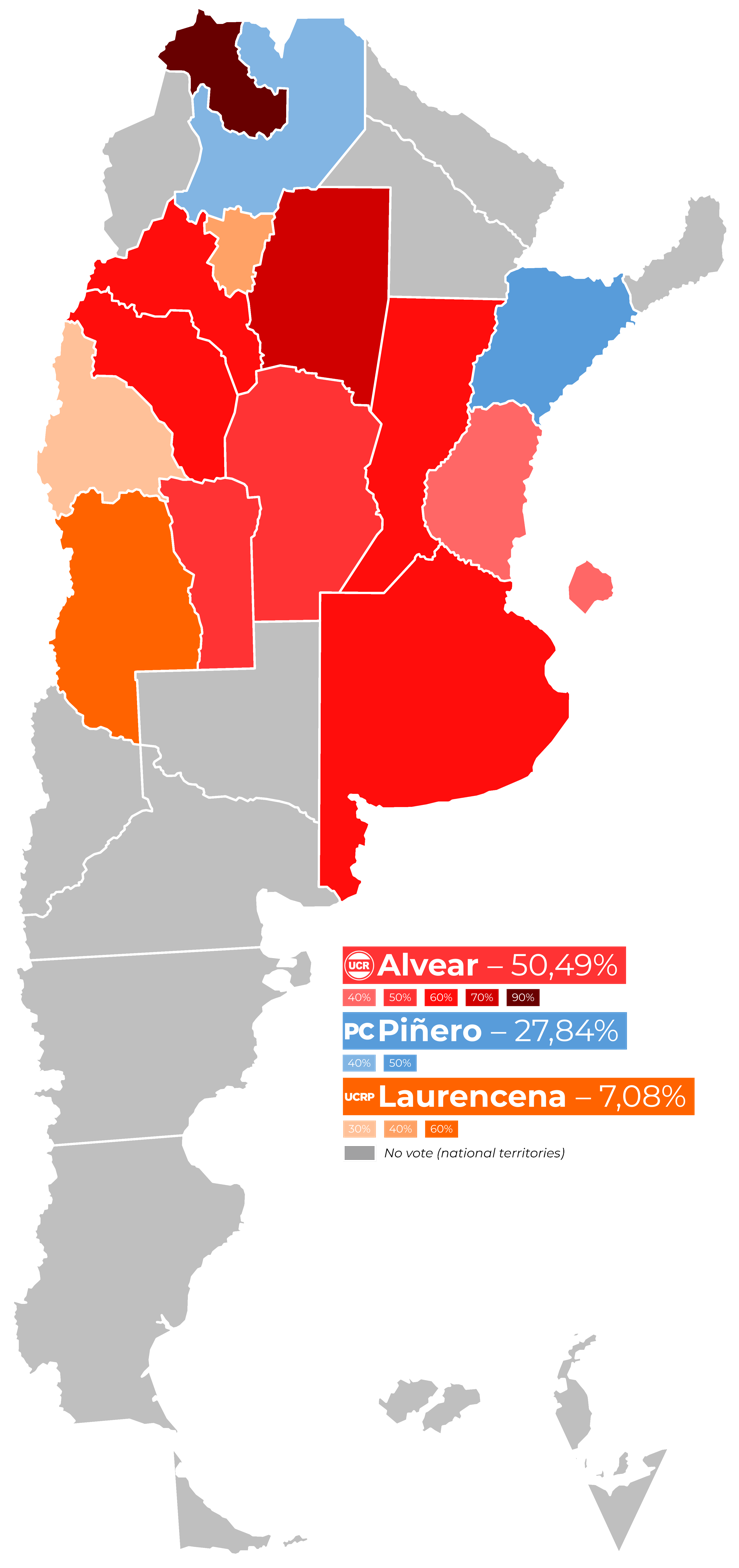
- Results by province
President before election
Hipólito Yrigoyen
UCR
Elected President
Marcelo Torcuato de Alvear
UCR
- Legislative election
- 85 of the 158 seats in the Chamber of Deputies
- Turnout: 56.41%
Party	Vote %	Seats	+/–
Radical Civic Union	50.05	49	0
National Concentration	26.89	20	+5
Socialist Party	10.04	7	0
Unified Radical Civic Union	5.96	7	+1
Democratic Progressive Party	5.33	3	+1
This lists parties that won seats. See the complete results below.
Results by province

General elections were held in Argentina on 2 April 1922. Marcelo Torcuato de Alvear of the Radical Civic Union (UCR) was elected president, while Elpidio González, also of the UCR, was elected vice-president. The UCR also maintained its majority in the Chamber of Deputies, winning 49 of the 85 seats available, leaving it holding 95 of the 158 seats in the Chamber. Voter turnout for the election was 55%, with the UCR receiving a plurality of 51% of the popular vote and carrying nine of the fourteen provinces.

== Background ==
Hipólito Yrigoyen's presidency had been marked by massive contradictions. One of the founders in 1891 of Argentina's first successful pluralist party, the Radical Civic Union (UCR), Yrigoyen filled 5 of his 8 cabinet positions with conservatives from the party that had monopolized power since 1874, the National Autonomists. He expounded on the virtues of "true suffrage," but removed 18 willful governors – including 4 of the UCR's own. He mediated numerous labor conflicts; but proved unable to control police and military brutality against striking workers. The resulting wave of violence was compounded by the creation of the paramilitary Argentine Patriotic League by a reactionary faction in the Argentine upper class, while Yrigoyen (and the courts) remained largely silent on these developments. Over two thousand strikers perished – some burned alive in silos.

Still, he advanced an array of reforms, including the country's first meaningful pension, collective bargaining and land reform laws, as well as expanded access to higher education and the creation of the first significant State enterprise (the oil concern, YPF). Argentina's economy rebounded strongly from World War I-related shortages of goods and credit, and Yrigoyen's vigorous labor policy helped translate this into record living standards.

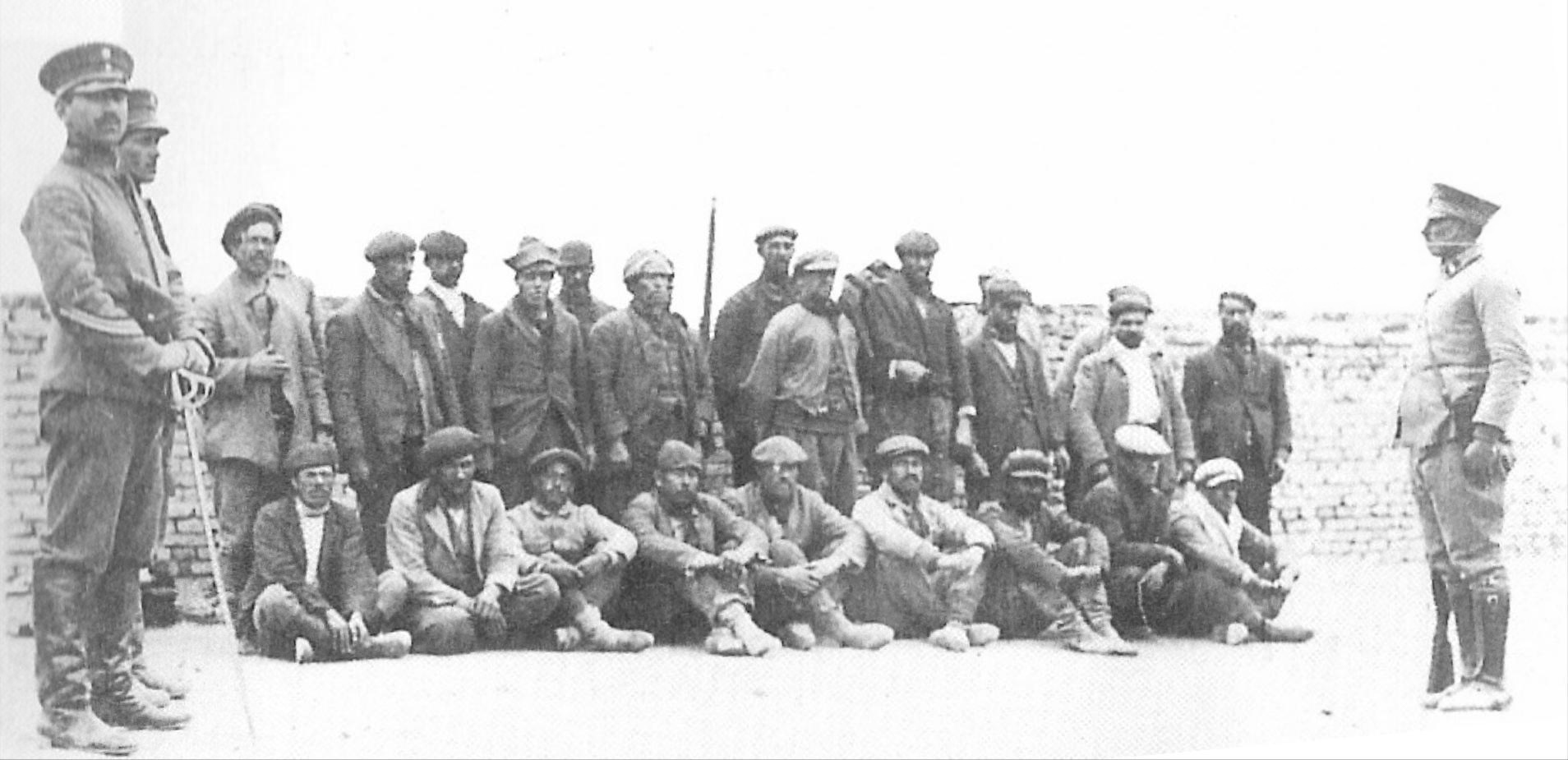
Striking Santa Cruz Province sheep ranch workers, prior to their illegal execution in 1921. Yrigoyen's unwillingness to prosecute these abuses did not prevent his UCR from a second, landslide victory amid an economic boom.

Yrigoyen prepared to leave office, though not the reins of power; beset by growing rivalries within the UCR itself, he turned to one of the co-founders of the UCR: the Ambassador to France, Marcelo Torcuato de Alvear. The scion of one of Argentina's traditional landed families, the well-mannered Alvear placated Yrigoyen's fears of losing control over his Radical Civic Union, a risk Yrigoyen insured himself against by placing his personal friend and former Buenos Aires Police Chief Elpidio González as Alvear's running mate. The conservative opposition in Congress that had dogged Yrigoyen early in his tenure had largely been overcome by 1920 through a string of electoral victories. The Senate, however, which was indirectly elected at the time, firmly entrenched in conservative hands only by a series of removal decrees that left 9 vacancies by 1922.

Most other important parties followed suit and, rather than put forth their paramount figures as candidates, they fell back on backbenchers with a reformist bent. Conservatives formed an alliance, the National Concentration, but did not nominate their most prominent figure, former Buenos Aires Province Governor Marcelino Ugarte. They instead nominated instead a respected reformer, criminal law attorney, named Norberto Piñero. Piñero had helped a needed overhaul of Argentina's penal code in 1890, a record his backers hoped could, in voters' minds, separate the hastily formed National Concentration from its ties to the violent Argentine Patriotic League. An increasingly respected Lisandro de la Torre who had been unable to promote his Democratic Progressive Party into an effective centrist alternative to the UCR, chose former Education Minister Dr. Carlos Ibarguren as the nominee. Argentine Socialists, led by Senator Juan B. Justo, nominated one of his closest collaborators, and, a leader in Argentina's cooperative movement, the respected Deputy Nicolás Repetto.

The abbreviated campaign resulted in another, landslide victory for the UCR. The party retained the presidency overwhelmingly and won 53 of the 82 congressional seats at stake, losing only in two provinces controlled by provincial parties, and two controlled by dissident UCR groups; the only Senate race, that of the City of Buenos Aires, was again won by the UCR, as well, and the party ended with 15 of 27 sitting Senators (protracted vacancies excluded). Ambassador Alvear, for his part, did not campaign at all - receiving news for the April 2 results precisely where he received President Yrigoyen's phone call offering him the nomination: in the Argentine Ambassador's residence in Paris.

== Candidates ==
- Radical Civic Union (populist): Ambassador to France Marcelo Torcuato de Alvear of the city of Buenos Aires
- National Concentration (conservative): Former Minister of Education Norberto Piñero of the city of Buenos Aires
- Democratic Progressive Party (reformist): Former Minister of Justice Carlos Ibarguren of Salta Province
- Socialist Party: Deputy Nicolás Repetto of the city of Buenos Aires
- Independent UCR (anti-Yrigoyen): Miguel Laurencena of Entre Ríos Province
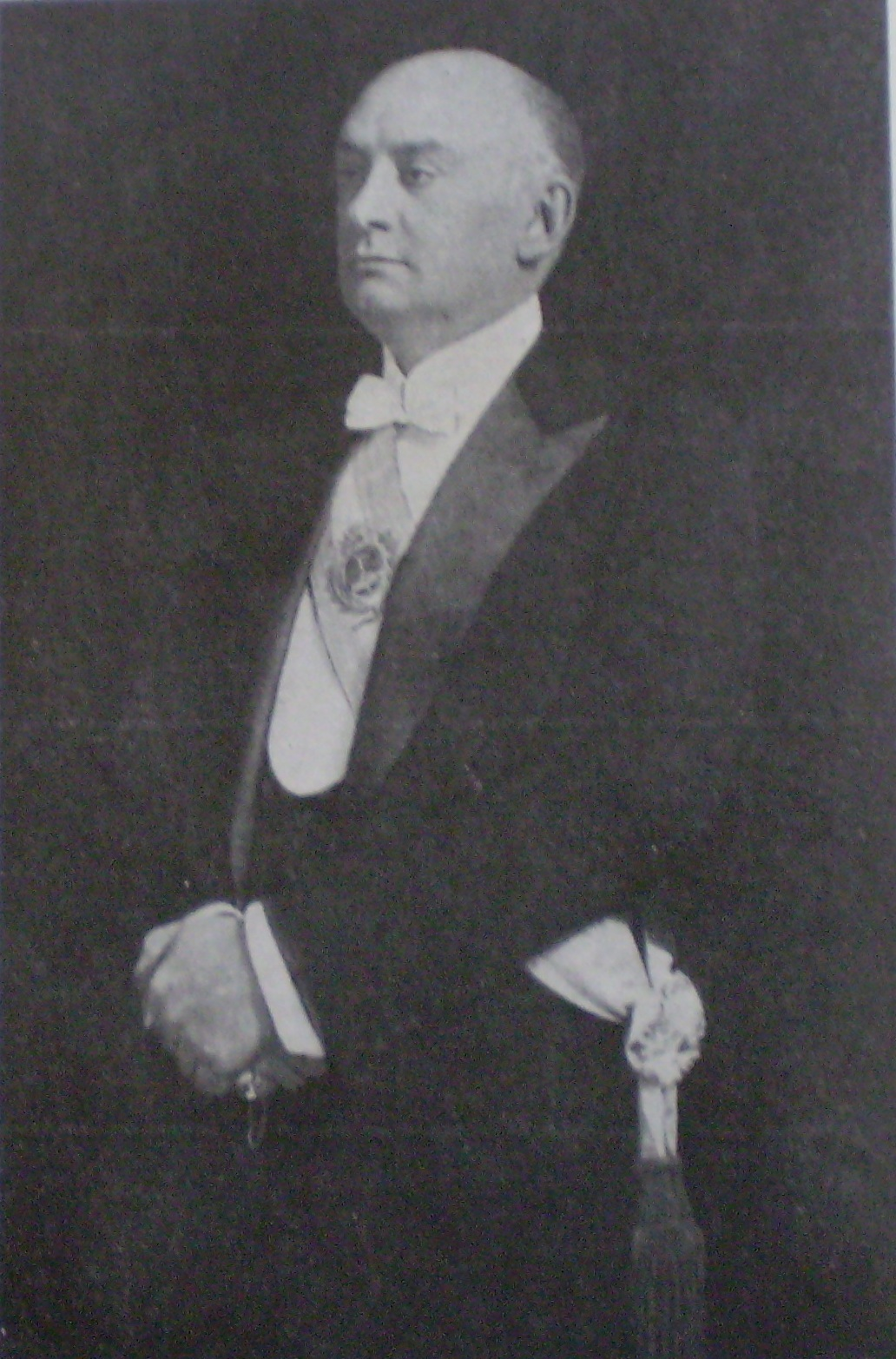
Alvear

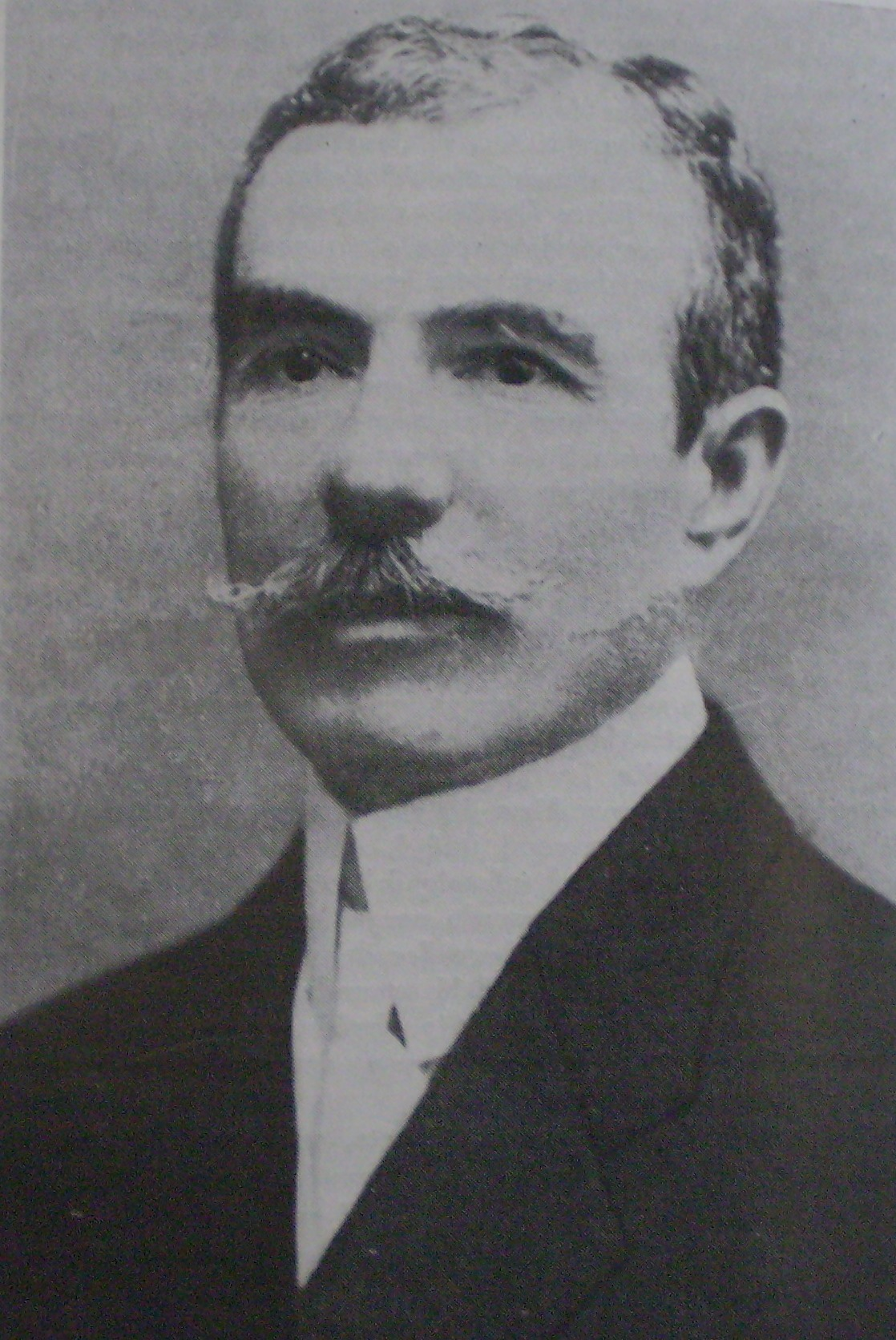
Piñero

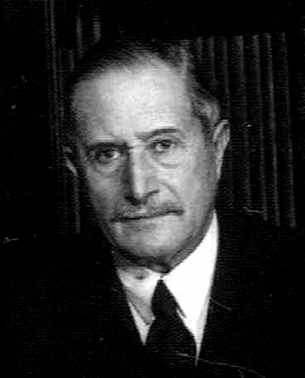
Ibarguren

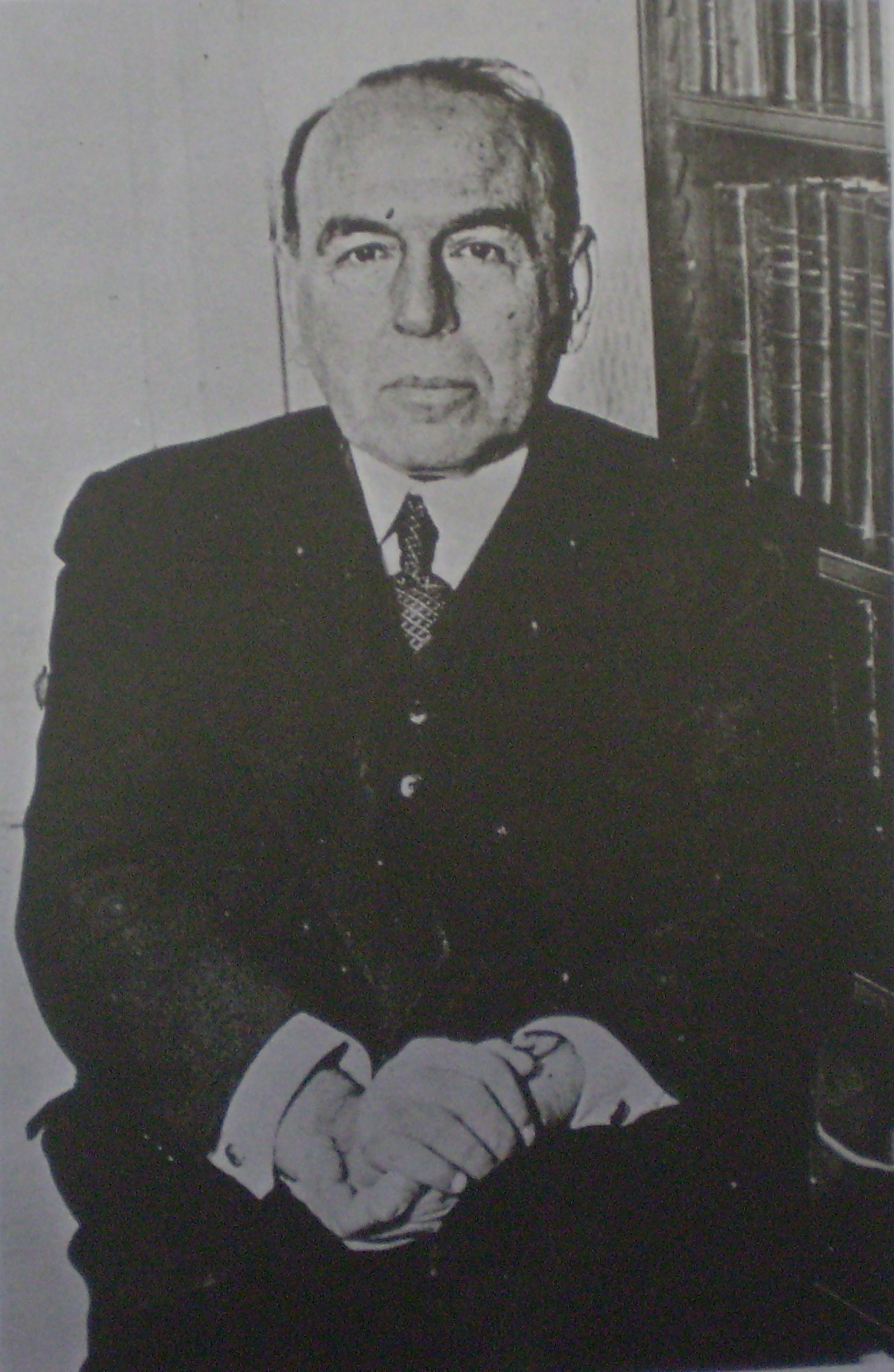
Repetto

== Results ==
=== President ===
==== Public vote ====
Candidate	Running mate	Party or alliance		Votes	%	Seats
Marcelo Torcuato de Alvear	Elpidio González	Radical Civic Union		419,170	50.49	216
Norberto Piñero	Rafael Núñez	National; Concentration	Conservative Party	62,029	7.47	29
Norberto Piñero	Rafael Núñez	National; Concentration	Popular Concentration	31,485	3.79	7
Norberto Piñero	Rafael Núñez	National; Concentration	Democratic Party of Córdoba	31,078	3.74	11
Norberto Piñero	Rafael Núñez	National; Concentration	National Concentration	25,415	3.06	0
Norberto Piñero	Rafael Núñez	National; Concentration	Autonomist–Liberal Pact	27,239	3.28	12
Norberto Piñero	Rafael Núñez	National; Concentration	Provincial Union	17,120	2.06	12
Norberto Piñero	Rafael Núñez	National; Concentration	Liberal Party of Tucumán	12,817	1.54	6
Norberto Piñero	Rafael Núñez	National; Concentration	Liberal Democratic Party	6,709	0.81	3
Norberto Piñero	Rafael Núñez	National; Concentration	Civic Concentration	5,972	0.72	2
Norberto Piñero	Rafael Núñez	National; Concentration	Catamarca Concentration	5,750	0.69	2
Norberto Piñero	Rafael Núñez	National; Concentration	Liberal Party of Mendoza	3,348	0.40	5
Norberto Piñero	Rafael Núñez	National; Concentration	Popular Union of La Rioja	2,140	0.26	2
Norberto Piñero	Rafael Núñez	National; Concentration	Total	231,102	27.84	91
Nicolás Repetto	Antonio de Tomaso	Socialist Party		78,472	9.45	22
Miguel Laurencena	Carlos Francisco Melo	Unified Radical; Civic Union	Tucumán Radical Civic Union	16,671	2.01	12
Miguel Laurencena	Carlos Francisco Melo	Unified Radical; Civic Union	Lencinist Radical Civic Union	14,150	1.70	11
Miguel Laurencena	Carlos Francisco Melo	Unified Radical; Civic Union	Principist Radical Civic Union	11,670	1.41	0
Miguel Laurencena	Carlos Francisco Melo	Unified Radical; Civic Union	Blockist Radical Civic Union	7,048	0.85	7
Miguel Laurencena	Carlos Francisco Melo	Unified Radical; Civic Union	Salta Radical Civic Union	6,707	0.81	3
Miguel Laurencena	Carlos Francisco Melo	Unified Radical; Civic Union	Intransigent Radical Civic Union	2,377	0.29	0
Miguel Laurencena	Carlos Francisco Melo	Unified Radical; Civic Union	Red Radical Civic Union	126	0.02	0
Miguel Laurencena	Carlos Francisco Melo	Unified Radical; Civic Union	Total	58,749	7.08	33
Carlos Ibarguren	Francisco E. Correa	Democratic Progressive Party		41,841	5.04	14
No candidate	No candidate	Jujuy Radical Union		1	0.00	0
No candidate	No candidate	Others		809	0.10	0
Total				830,144	100.00	376
Valid votes				830,144	94.59	
Invalid/blank votes				47,508	5.41	
Total votes				877,652	100.00	
Registered voters/turnout				1,586,366	55.32	
Source: Ministry of the Interior

==== Electoral College vote ====
Candidate	Party	Votes	%
Marcelo Torcuato de Alvear	Radical Civic Union	235	69.94
Norberto Piñero	National Concentration	60	17.86
Nicolás Repetto	Socialist Party	22	6.55
Carlos Ibarguren	Democratic Progressive Party	10	2.98
Miguel Laurencena	Principist Radical Civic Union	6	1.79
Rafael Núñez	National Concentration	2	0.60
José A. Correa	Blockist Radical Civic Union	1	0.30
Total		336	100.00
Registered voters/turnout		376	–

==== By province ====
Province	de Alvear	Piñero	Repetto	Ibarguren	Laurencena	Núñez	J. Correa
Buenos Aires City	46		22				
Buenos Aires	56	22					
Catamarca	6	1					
Córdoba	22	9					
Corrientes	6	11					
Entre Ríos	15	3					
Jujuy	6	2					
La Rioja	6	2					
Mendoza	11						
Salta	3	4					
San Juan	2				6		1
San Luis	7						
Santa Fe	28			10			
Santiago del Estero	11					2	
Tucumán	10	6					
Total	235	60	22	10	6	2	1
Source: Senate

=== Vice president ===
Candidate	Party	Votes	%
Elpidio González	Radical Civic Union	235	69.94
Rafael Núñez	National Concentration	60	17.86
Antonio de Tomaso	Socialist Party	22	6.55
Francisco E. Correa	Democratic Progressive Party	12	3.57
Carlos Francisco Melo	Principist Radical Civic Union	6	1.79
Marcial V. Quiroga	Blockist Radical Civic Union	1	0.30
Total		336	100.00
Registered voters/turnout		376	–

==== By province ====
Province	González	Núñez	de Tomaso	F. E. Correa	Melo	Quiroga
Buenos Aires City	46		22			
Buenos Aires	56	22				
Catamarca	6	1				
Córdoba	22	9				
Corrientes	6	11				
Entre Ríos	15	3				
Jujuy	6	2				
La Rioja	6	2				
Mendoza	11					
Salta	3	4				
San Juan	2				6	1
San Luis	7					
Santa Fe	28			10		
Santiago del Estero	11			2		
Tucumán	10	6				
Total	235	60 (Note: Although only 60 electors voted for Rafael Núñez, in the final count he appears with 58 votes.)	22	12	6	1
Source: Senate

=== Chamber of Deputies ===
Party or alliance		Votes	%	Seats	
Party or alliance		Votes	%	Won	Total
Radical Civic Union		405,316	50.05	49	95
National Concentration	Conservative Party	61,795	7.63	6	–
National Concentration	Popular Concentration	31,612	3.90	2	–
National Concentration	Democratic Party of Córdoba	31,393	3.88	2	–
National Concentration	Autonomist–Liberal Pact	27,109	3.35	3	–
National Concentration	National Concentration	22,010	2.72	0	–
National Concentration	Provincial Union	17,732	2.19	3	–
National Concentration	Liberal Party of Tucumán	12,799	1.58	1	–
National Concentration	Catamarca Concentration	5,757	0.71	0	–
National Concentration	Civic Concentration	5,464	0.67	0	–
National Concentration	Popular Union of La Rioja	2,124	0.26	0	–
National Concentration	Total	217,795	26.89	17	27
Socialist Party		81,283	10.04	4	10
Unified Radical Civic Union	Tucumán Radical Civic Union	16,767	2.07	4	–
Unified Radical Civic Union	Principist Radical Civic Union	14,737	1.82	0	–
Unified Radical Civic Union	Blockist Radical Civic Union	7,240	0.89	2	–
Unified Radical Civic Union	Salta Radical Civic Union	7,092	0.88	1	–
Unified Radical Civic Union	Intransigent Radical Civic Union	2,436	0.30	0	–
Unified Radical Civic Union	Total	48,272	5.96	7	8
Democratic Progressive Party		43,127	5.33	3	13
Communist Party of Argentina		6,147	0.76	0	0
National Feminist Party		717	0.09	0	0
Public Health Party		571	0.07	0	0
Others		6,619	0.82	0	0
Vacant				5	5
Total		809,847	100.00	85	158
Valid votes		809,847	95.89		
Invalid/blank votes		34,743	4.11		
Total votes		844,590	100.00		
Registered voters/turnout		1,497,264	56.41		
Source: Ministry of the Interior
