= Ibarguren =

Ibarguren may refer to:

== People ==
- Carlos Ibarguren (1877-1956), Argentine academic, historian, and politician
- Miren Ibarguren (born 1980), Spanish actress

== Others ==
- Copa Ibarguren, football tournament
