= Communist Party of Argentina (Extraordinary Congress) =

Political party in Argentina founded in 1996

Communist Party (Extraordinary Congress) Partido Comunista (Congreso Extraordinario)
- Abbreviation: PCCE
- General Secretary: Pablo Pereyra
- Founded: December 2, 1996; 29 years ago
- Split from: Communist Party of Argentina
- Headquarters: México 2086, Buenos Aires
- Newspaper: Nuestra Palabra; Raíces Latinoamericanas
- Youth wing: Communist Youth Federation (Extraordinary Congress)
- Ideology: Communism; Marxism–Leninism; Kirchnerism
- Political position: Far-left
- National affiliation: Homeland Force
- International affiliation: São Paulo Forum
- Colours: Red
- Slogan: The Left in Frente de Todos
- Mercosur MPs: 0 / 43
- Senators: 0 / 72
- Deputies: 0 / 257
- Governors: 0 / 24
- Legislators: 0 / 1,199
- Municipalities: 0 / 2,112

Party flag

Website
- www.pcce.com.ar

The Communist Party (Extraordinary Congress) (Spanish: Partido Comunista (Congreso Extraordinario), PCCE) is an Argentine Marxist-Leninist party. The PCCE is a part of the Unión por la Patria (formerly Frente de Todos), a Peronist coalition in Argentina. Its name was adopted after a dispute with the Communist Party of Argentina caused a division between its members, resulting in the organization of an extraordinary congress that gave way to the foundation of the PCCE between December 1–2, 1996.

The Party is currently present in a variety of Argentine regions, such as the capital city and the provinces of Buenos Aires, Santa Fe, Entre Ríos, Córdoba, San Luis, Formosa, Misiones, and San Juan, among others.

PCCE publishes Nuestra Palabra and Raíces Latinoamericanas.

== History ==
=== Origin ===
Since the late 1990s, the Communist Party of Argentina began to have strong internal disputes over the leadership of its Central Committee, and differences in the vision about the political strategy that the party should take after the fall of the Soviet bloc. One of those discussions ended in a new fraction. In December 1996, a group of Communist Party militants, opposed to Patricio Echegaray, held an Extraordinary Congress, as a result of an internal dispute with the leadership of the Central Committee. That discussion led to a massive expulsion of party members, who subsequently decided to form a new party, dubbed the "Communist Party (Extraordinary Congress)" in reference to the Extraordinary Congress that marked the fraction.

=== Objectives, political beliefs, and differences with the Communist Party ===
The ultimate objective of the PCCE, manifested by its militants and leaders, is the installation of a socialist and communist system in Argentina, derived from a process of national and social liberation. As a means to achieve this end, the PCCE proposes the line of the National and Social Liberation Front (FLNS, for its initials in Spanish), a political line approved in the historic 16th Congress of the Communist Party held in 1986, in the ideological tradition of the Popular Front, historic unions of Communists and Social Democrats. In this sense, the PCCE has been part of different fronts and social, union, and political confluences of varying weight in the Argentine political scene.

However, while it maintains significantly different beliefs in terms of political and ideological positions, the PCCE raises an instance of confluence with the militancy of the Communist Party, as long as the differences between the different lines respect Marxism–Leninism and the accent is placed on popular unity (unity with progressive sectors, the center-left, social democrats, etc., with the immediate aim of defeating the local oligarchy and beginning to develop the FLNS) rather than on unity with the Trotskyist left, as the Communist Party proposed at the time when it joined the Socialist Movement of Workers in the United Left bloc.

The PCCE considers that one of the steps to advance in the development of a National and Social Liberation Front is the formation of a Communist Party through the unity of the communists of the Communist Party of Argentina, the PCCE, of those who have abandoned political activism, and with the sum of future militants, in addition to the construction of the front with other left and progressive forces.

The PCCE proclaims itself the defender of Marxism–Leninism in Argentina and claims it as a political doctrine for the communists. Within the debate on the history of Argentine communism, the PCCE vindicates the most emblematic figures of the Communist Party (such as Victorio Codovilla, Rodolfo Ghioldi and Jorge Calvo), while recognizing past mistakes and defending the political-ideological line inherited from key Congresses in the history of the Communist Party, such as the VIII Congress, held in 1928; the XI Congress, held in 1946; or the XVI Congress, held in 1986.

The PCCE is usually linked in the field of the Argentine left as a defender of the political process opened by the governments of Néstor Kirchner and Cristina Fernández de Kirchner. On the other hand, the PCCE has participated in the foundation of the Movimiento Libres del Sur, which in its beginnings was linked to Kirchnerism but later broke ranks and turned to the center-left opposition.

The PCCE has also joined the Popular and National Transversal Front led by Edgardo Depetri, of which it no longer participates, as well as a nascent coalition of social organizations, political parties, and mayors of various origins. Many are within kirchnerism, but these are not linked to the PCCE, since some are opponents of communism, which is why this space continues in constant internal disputes and remains unnamed, having been born under the slogan "The country we want, the force we need", and called by the communists as the "Espacio de Unidad Popular" ("Space of Popular Unity") or "Mesa de Unidad Popular" ("Popular Unity Assembly"). Since 2005 to date, the Party continues to form the support base of the government headed by Cristina Fernández de Kirchner, support that has been expressed in the attendance of its militants to the act carried out by the kirchnerists to commemorate each anniversary of the election that led Néstor Kirchner to the government in 2003–2004.

On April 27, 2012, numerous political and social organizations came together in a massive event at the Club Atlético Vélez Sarsfield stadium, in the Buenos Aires neighborhood of Liniers. Under the slogan "United and Organized", the next steps were proposed on the path of political unity within the kirchnerist militancy, in support and defense of the government of the then president Cristina Fernández de Kirchner. The PCCE was part of that convocation and is a founding member of the United and Organized Front.

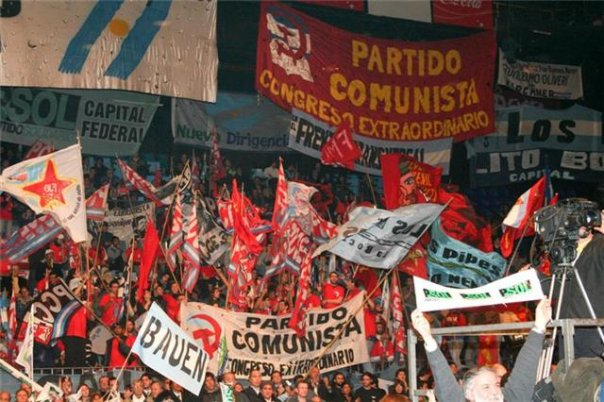
The PCCE during a campaign event on June 22, 2009.

The PCCE maintains an internal structure that is in constant development, given its short existence and its militant base. Its organization and principles are laid out in the Declaration of Principles approved by the Central Committee of the Communist Party, in the statute of December 21, 1985, which proclaims that "[...] The dimension of the historical struggle for national liberation, socialism and communism demands that the Party, in matters of organization, abide by the norms of democratic centralism", the classic methodology of communist parties created by Lenin.

Its youth branch is the Communist Youth Federation (Extraordinary Congress) (or FJC-CE), which has a presence both at the union level and at the student level (secondary, tertiary, and university). In this last sector, the current university role of the FJC-CE stands out, where the Entre Ríos University Federation (FUER) leads together with the Peronist University Youth (JUP), as well as the leadership of the general secretariats of the University Federation Buenos Aires (FUBA) and the Argentine University Federation (FUA). Its trade union branch is the Trade Union Current of Liberation, formerly called the Agustín Tosco National Current (CoNAT).

Its main organ of dissemination is the newspaper Nuestra Palabra (or "Our Word" in English), a name inherited from the historic Communist Party newspaper at the time of its highest reach. Another periodic publication is the magazine "Raíces Latinoamericanas" ("Latin American Roots"), of a theoretical nature and more closely linked to political debate.

=== The PCCE in the elections ===
The party debuted in the 1999 Argentine general election as a part of the Resistance Front, which together with the current Patria Libre, presented Jorge Reyna and Gabriel Moccia as candidates. The formula obtained 54.800 and ended up in seventh place.

By 2000, the PCCE had joined the Polo Social, a space that emerged against the neoliberal policies of the government of Fernando de la Rúa. With this space, it participated in the 2001 Argentine legislative election, where it obtained 578.554 votes, occupying fourth place, and obtaining four seats.

In the 2003 Argentine general election, the party did not form an electoral front. Instead, it decided not to stand in the elections, nor did it endorse any candidate.

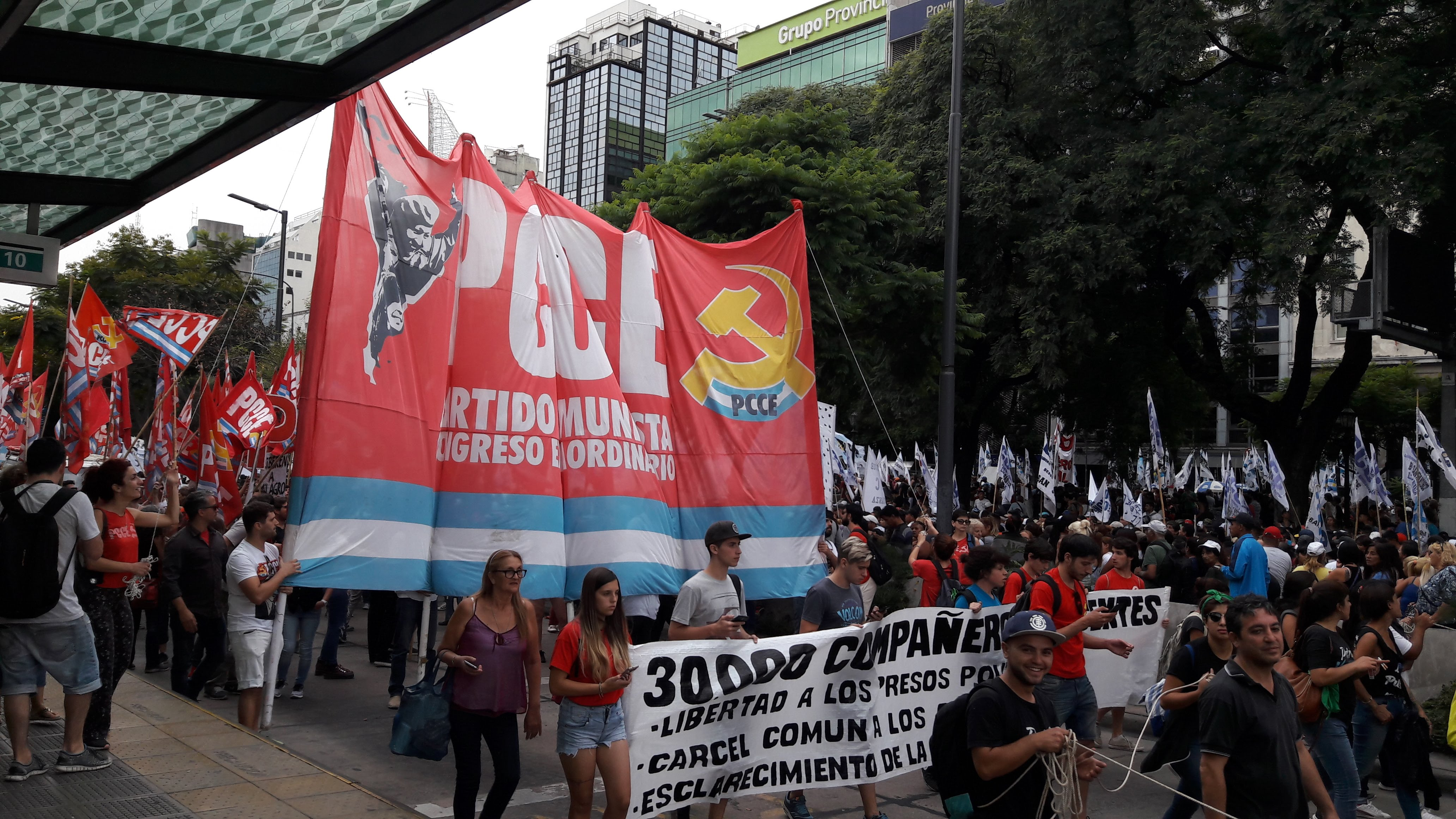
The PCCE during the 42nd anniversary of the 1976 coup d'état.

In 2005, the PCCE adhered to the frontist proposal launched by some transversal leaders, but given its failure, they decided to openly call for the Front for Victory to vote, publishing photos of Cristina Fernández and Rafael Bielsa in their press. The entry of the PCCE to the support base of kirchnerism began during this time.

In the 2007 general election, the party decided to support the candidacy of Cristina Kirchner.

The PCCE also supported the Cristina Kirchner's re-election campaign in the 2011 elections, which won with more than 54% of the votes, and revalidated the mandate of the President. In that year they also participated in the legislative elections, presenting Braulio Silva as the candidate for legislator of the City of Buenos Aires.

In 2015, after 10 years in the Front for Victory, the PCCE once again supported its candidacy for the 2015 presidential elections, with Daniel Scioli as president, a candidate highly questioned by the rest of the Argentinian left. These elections would be the first that kirchnerism would lose since its arrival to the presidency in 2003.

During the 2017 mid-term elections, the party participated as a part of the kirchnerist coalition Citizen's Unity (alongside other organizations and political parties) in order to show support for the legislative candidacy of Cristina Kirchner, while also presenting Braulio Silva as a candidate for the City of Buenos Aires.

After joining the left-wing coalition Frente de Todos, the party again supported Kirchnerism in the 2019 presidential elections, with the candidacy of Alberto Fernández as president and Cristina Kirchner as vice president. The ticket won the elections with more than 48% of the popular vote.

For the 2025 Argentine legislative election, the party released a statement: "On October 26, fundamental issues for our nation and our people are at stake. We must channel discontent, indignation, and anger into a massive vote for Fuerza Patria, so that this time the rejection of neoliberalism prevails nationally. This traitorous government must back down and stop attacking the majority, the retirees, and the poor."

== General secretaries ==
No.	Secretary	Period
1	Jorge Pereyra	December 2, 1996 – April 29, 2013
2	Pablo Pereyra	April 29, 2013—present

== Elections ==
=== Presidential elections ===
Election	Candidates	First round		Second round		Result	Notes
Election	Candidates	Votes	%	Votes	%	Result	Notes
1999	Jorge Reyna (president) Gabriel Moccia (vice president)	54.809	0,29			✗ Not elected	Frente de la Resistencia
2003							Did not participate
2007	Cristina Kirchner (president) Julio Cobos (vice president)	8.652.293	45.28			✓ Elected	Front for Victory
2011	Cristina Kirchner (president) Amado Boudou (vice president)	11.865.055	54,11			✓ Elected	Front for Victory
2015	Daniel Scioli (president) Carlos Zannini (vice president)	9.338.490	37,08	12.309.575	48,66	✗ Not elected	Front for Victory
2019	Alberto Fernández (president) Cristina Kirchner (vice president)	12.942.183	48,24			✓ Elected	Everyone's Front
2023	Sergio Massa (president) Agustín Rossi (vice president)	9.853.492	36,78	11.598.720	44,35	✗ Not elected	Union for the Homeland

== See also ==
- Politics of Argentina
