= Gerónimo Arnedo Álvarez =

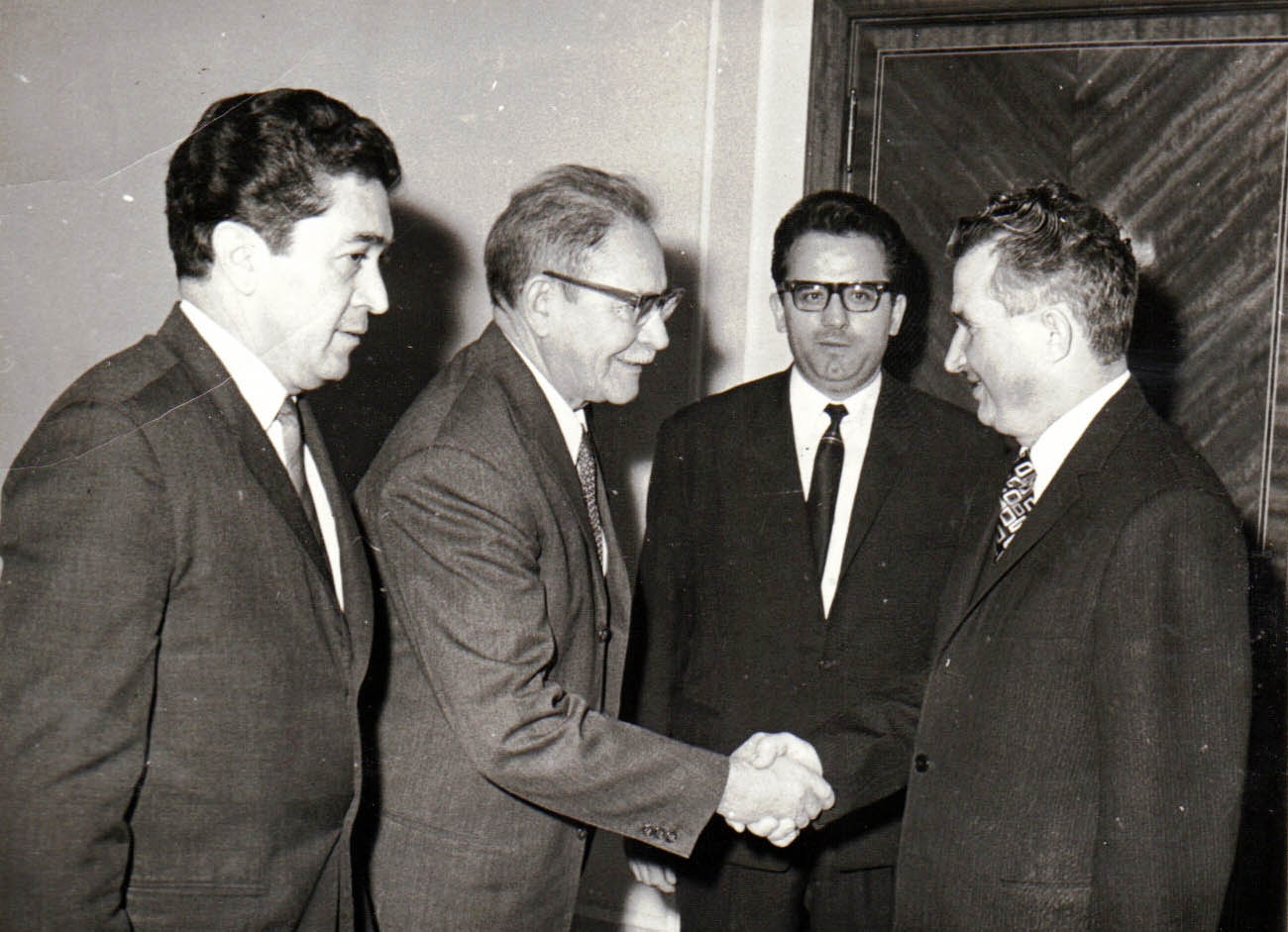
- Álvarez meeting Romanian president Nicolae Ceaușescu, October 1971

Secretary-general of the Communist Party of Argentina
- In office 3 March 1963 – 13 June 1980
- Preceded by: Victorio Codovilla
- Succeeded by: Athos Fava

Personal details
- Born: 14 October 1897 San Nicolás, Buenos Aires, Argentina
- Died: 12 June 1980 (aged 82) Buenos Aires, Argentina
- Party: Communist Party of Argentina (1925–1980)
- Education: International Lenin School

Gerónimo Arnedo Álvarez (14 October 1897 – 12 June 1980) was an Argentine communist politician and labor leader. He is mostly known for having been a long-time general secretary of the Communist Party of Argentina.

== Biography ==
Arnedo was born in to a family of poor dock workers and from 1913, he worked first as a farm laborer on a plantation, then at a refrigeration plant, and as a loader in the port. In 1925 he joined the Argentine Communist Party and was a member of its trade union. In 1927, he led the leadership of strikes protesting the execution in the United States of Sacco and Vanzetti.

Until 1930, he held low positions in the party in the port city of Avellaneda but began to climb the ranks within the party soon after. In 1933, he became a member of the party's Central Committee, leaving physical labor and switching entirely to party work. From 1930 to 1932, during the dictatorship of General Uriburu (and then during the Second World War), he was underground engaging in the organization of trade unions. At the end of 1933, he was sent by the party to Moscow, where he studied at the International Lenin School and, according to some sources, participated in the construction of the Moscow Metro. He returned to his homeland in 1935.

From 1935 to 1937, he headed the party organization in Buenos Aires; in June 1938, he joined the executive committee of the Communist Party and soon became its general secretary after being endorsed by Victorio Codovilla who was in Paris. For his activities, he was arrested by the authorities in 1930, 1931, and in February 1943. He remained Secretary General until the end of his life and was re-elected for the last time in 1973. He published a number of works on the history of the labor movement in Argentina.
