= Carlos Ibarguren =

Argentine academic, historian and politician

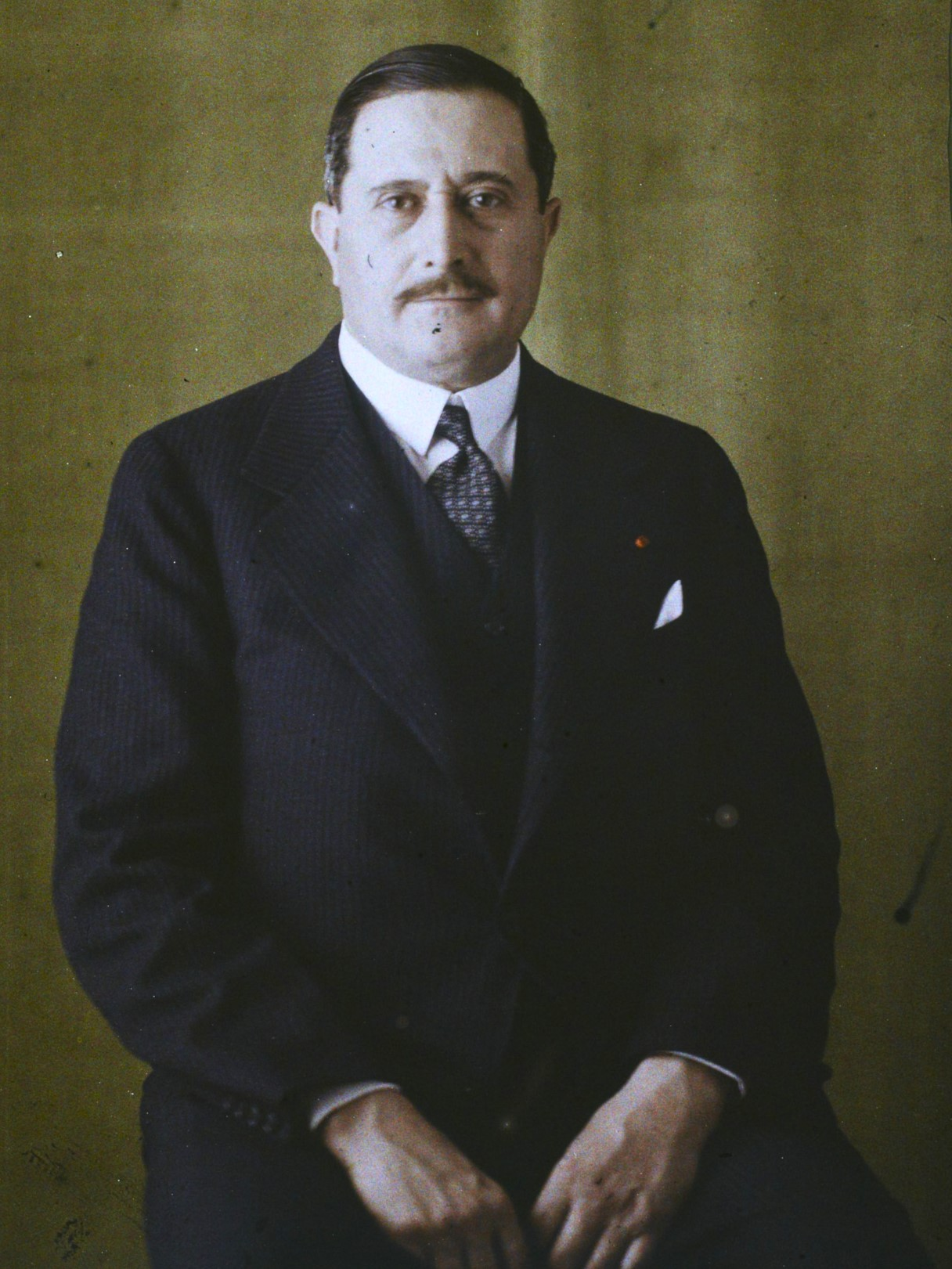
- Autochrome by Georges Chevalier, 1928
- Born: Carlos Ibarguren; April 18, 1877; Salta
- Died: April 3, 1956 (aged 78); Buenos Aires
- Education: University of Buenos Aires
- Occupation: Professor of law
- Employer: University of Buenos Aires
- Known for: Politician
- Notable work: Juan Manuel de Rosas (1930), Las sociedades literarias y la revolución argentina (1938), La historia que he vivido (1955)
- Title: De facto Federal Interventor of Córdoba
- Term: 1930 - 1931
- Predecessor: Basilio Pertiné
- Successor: Enrique P. Torino
- Political party: Democratic Progressive Party

Carlos Ibarguren (April 18, 1877 – April 3, 1956) was an Argentine academic, historian and politician. As a writer he was noted as one of the foremost academics of the history of Argentina as well as a leading expert on constitutional law. Politically he was initially associated with the liberal tendency amongst the country's intelligentsia before moving to far right nationalism in later life.

== Early career ==
Ibarguren was born on Salta, in 1877 to Dr. Federico Ibarguren and Margarita Uriburu and was schooled locally. He then went to the University of Buenos Aires, graduating with a doctorate of law in 1898. An academic by profession, Ibarguren was a professor of law at the University of Buenos Aires, his alma mater. Recognised for his fine legal and constitutional mind from 1904 onwards he held several undersecretary positions within the government. Utilising his experience Roque Sáenz Peña appointed him as justice minister during his administration of Roque Sáenz Peña, a position he held until 1914.

After this spell in office, Ibarguren continued as a supporter of the Radical Civic Union for a time. However he became a founder of the Democratic Progressive Party in 1914 and served as its vice-president whilst also drafting its programme. In this role he became a strong critic of the government of Hipólito Yrigoyen. He was an unsuccessful candidate in the 1920 legislative elections, part of a list of intellectuals that included the likes of Lisandro de la Torre and Ezequiel Ramos Mexía but which failed to make an impact with the voters. He was chosen as Democratic Progressive candidate for the 1922 presidential election, although he managed only 7.7% of the vote.

== Move to the right ==
Up to this point, Ibarguren had been associated with the liberalism that defined Argentina's cultural elite but the setbacks of 1920 saw his positions alter. His book of the same year, La literatura y la gran guerra, demonstrated a shift to the nationalism that was to come to dominate his political thought. He argued that democracy left the door open to too many disparate groups and that it needed brakes which should be provided by a united conservative right. Politically Ibarguren grew interested in using the masses as a bulwark of reactionary activity and as such moved close to the ideas of fascism.

Following the 1930 coup of Gen. José Félix Uriburu, Ibarguren petitioned the new president to switch to corporatism and this economic model came to dominate his thinking until, under Ibarguren's advice, Juan Perón allowed the corporations to be represented in parliament in 1948. Despite this however, Ibarguren held no formal positions within the governments of either Uriburu or Perón and largely concentrated on his academic pursuits. His last political role of note was as De facto Federal Interventor of Córdoba from 1930 to 1931, a post entrusted to him by Uriburu. Ibarguren died in Buenos Aires, in 1956.

== Writing ==
Ibarguren was especially noted for his work on the history of Argentina, with his most celebrated books being Juan Manuel de Rosas (1930), Las sociedades literarias y la revolución argentina (1938) and La historia que he vivido (1955). He also served as president of the Argentine Academy of Letters.

== Works ==
- Juan Manuel de Rosas (1930)
- En la penumbra de la Historia Argentina (1932)
- Estampas de Argentinos (1935)
- Las sociedades literarias y la revolución argentina (1937)
- La reforma Constitucional, sus fundamentos y su estructura (1948)
- San Martín íntimo (1950)
- La historia que he vivido (1955).

== See also ==
- Copa Ibarguren
