= 1920 Argentine legislative election =

- 7 March 1920
- 101 of the 158 seats in the Chamber of Deputies
- Turnout: 53.74%
| Party | Vote % | Seats | +/– |
|---|---|---|---|
| Radical Civic Union | 47.20 | 62 | +36 |
| Conservative Parties | 17.85 | 15 | −5 |
| Democratic Progressive Party | 16.21 | 14 | +6 |
| Socialist Party | 11.69 | 7 | +4 |
| Unified Radical Civic Union | 4.50% | 3 | −1 |
This lists parties that won seats. See the complete results below.
Results by province

Legislative elections were held in Argentina on 7 March. Voters chose their legislators and numerous governors, and with a turnout of 54%.

== Background ==
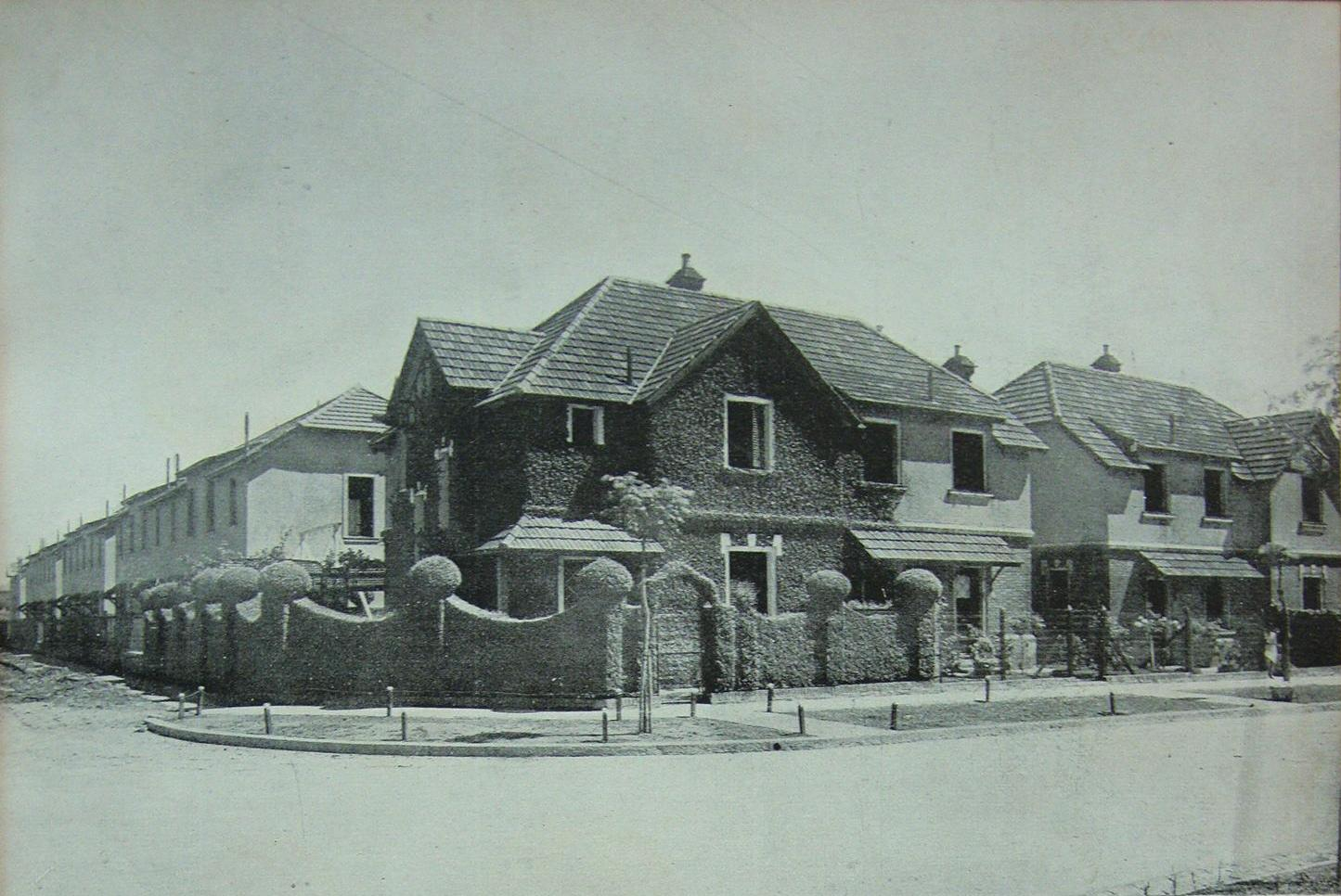
A CNCB community in Buenos Aires. Programs such as these catalyzed support for Yrigoyen amid a roaring economy.

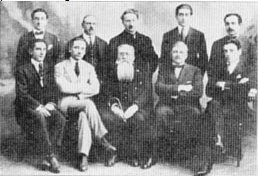
Mar del Plata Mayor Teodoro Bronzini (light suit) and the new, Socialist city government, among the first in the Americas.

A strong economy and a vigorous social policy helped make 1920 a banner year for President Hipólito Yrigoyen, whose UCR won 61 of the 102 seats at stake in the Lower House of Congress.

The party emerged victorious in the City of Buenos Aires, Entre Ríos, La Rioja, Santiago del Estero, and even in districts which had hitherto been dominated by either opposition parties (such as Buenos Aires Province and Tucumán), or dissident factions of the UCR (as in the case of Santa Fe). The party effectively displaced both the Socialist and Democratic Progressive parties in the highly competitive Buenos Aires district by supporting labor rights and advancing programs such as the National Inexpensive Housing Commission (CNCB), which added thousands of units to the capital's perennially strained housing supply. The addition of 38 seats to the Chamber of Deputies, partly as a result of the 1914 Census, further enhanced the UCR's sweep, and for the first time, gave them an absolute majority in the Lower House.

Socialists made modest gains in Congress, and won control of local governments in Zárate and Mar del Plata (the first in Argentina). The Democratic Progressive Party, organized by reformist Congressman Lisandro de la Torre from his Southern League in 1914, continued to make gains, and triumphed in Córdoba Province (though not in Santa Fe, de la Torre's home province). They displaced their former allies, the Conservatives (a holdover from the landowner-controlled National Autonomist Party, which was in power from 1874 to 1916), as the largest party in the minority. Conservatives continued to dominate the Senate, however, and much of Yrigoyen's legislation - notably the establishment of a national merchant marine - continued to encounter long delays. Nor had Yrigoyen been persuasive among the nation's governors, and at the time of the March 1920 elections, fully 14 had been replaced by presidentially-decreed federal intervention.

The removal of Governors by presidential decree had, by itself, helped discourage the establishment of dissident UCR factions, of which there were no fewer than five prior to the election; these elections left only Mendoza Province with a dissident UCR majority delegation. The most prominent such faction, that was led by Santa Fe Governor Rodolfo Lehmann and 8 Congressmen at its height, was weakened by his resignation at the end of 1919, and presented no candidates in 1920. The reformist governor's struggle with the La Forestal logging company, whose striking workers were brutally repressed by both company heavies and national troops, was more to blame for his departure than were differences with President Yrigoyen, and illustrated the limits of the era of pluralist government that began in 1916.

== Results ==
| Party or alliance | | Votes | % | Seats | |
| Party or alliance | | Votes | % | Won | Total |
|---|---|---|---|---|---|
| Radical Civic Union | | 338,881 | 47.20 | 62 | 95 |
| Conservative Parties | Conservative Party | 71,473 | 9.96 | 10 | – |
| Conservative Parties | Liberal Party of Corrientes | 16,453 | 2.29 | 2 | – |
| Conservative Parties | Liberal Party of Tucumán | 12,769 | 1.78 | 0 | – |
| Conservative Parties | Provincial Union | 8,092 | 1.13 | 1 | – |
| Conservative Parties | Civic Concentration | 7,712 | 1.07 | 2 | – |
| Conservative Parties | Democratic Union | 6,120 | 0.85 | 0 | – |
| Conservative Parties | Autonomist Party of Mendoza | 5,551 | 0.77 | 0 | – |
| Conservative Parties | Total | 128,170 | 17.85 | 15 | 32 |
| Democratic Progressive Party | | 116,383 | 16.21 | 14 | 14 |
| Socialist Party | | 83,959 | 11.69 | 7 | 10 |
| Unified Radical Civic Union | Intransigent Radical Civic Union | 9,450 | 1.32 | 0 | – |
| Unified Radical Civic Union | Black Radical Civic Union | 8,671 | 1.21 | 1 | – |
| Unified Radical Civic Union | Lencinist Radical Civic Union | 7,319 | 1.02 | 1 | – |
| Unified Radical Civic Union | Officialist Radical Civic Union | 4,109 | 0.57 | 1 | – |
| Unified Radical Civic Union | Independent Radical Civic Union | 2,785 | 0.39 | 0 | – |
| Unified Radical Civic Union | Total | 32,334 | 4.50 | 3 | 7 |
| Argentine Socialist Party | | 8,726 | 1.22 | 0 | 0 |
| International Socialist Party | | 4,427 | 0.62 | 0 | 0 |
| Popular Union of La Rioja | | 2,181 | 0.30 | 0 | 0 |
| National Feminist Party | | 1,258 | 0.18 | 0 | 0 |
| Unitarian Party | | 672 | 0.09 | 0 | 0 |
| Agrarian League | | 381 | 0.05 | 0 | 0 |
| Others | | 585 | 0.08 | 0 | 0 |
| Total | | 717,957 | 100.00 | 101 | 158 |
| Valid votes | | 717,957 | 93.01 | | |
| Invalid/blank votes | | 53,956 | 6.99 | | |
| Total votes | | 771,913 | 100.00 | | |
| Registered voters/turnout | | 1,436,472 | 53.74 | | |
Source: Ministry of Interior
