= Norberto Piñero =

Argentine politician (1858–1938)

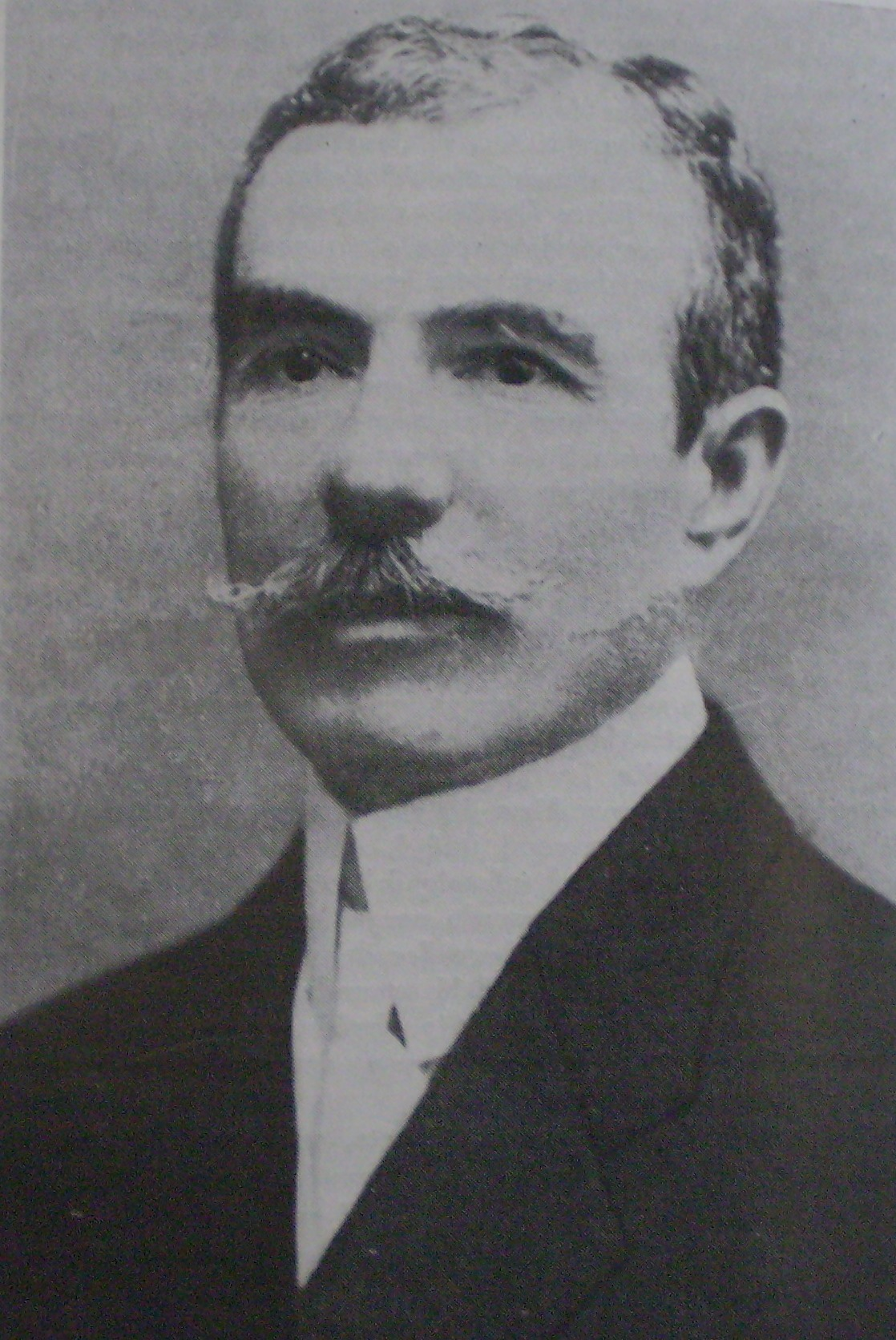
Norberto Piñero

Norberto Piñero (1858–1938) was a prominent Argentine lawyer, writer and conservative politician.

== Life and times ==
Norberto Piñero was born to a landed family in the Province of Buenos Aires, in 1858. He enrolled at the University of Buenos Aires and received a juris doctor in 1882. Becoming a Law Professor at his alma mater, Piñero joined his academic colleagues, Rodolfo Rivarola and José Nicolás Matienzo, in drafting a proposal for the overhaul of Argentina's penal code, in 1890. Presented to Congress in 1891, the proposal was notable for its elevation crimes committed in the exercise of public administration to a unified category whose severity would be just below that of sedition or high treason. The bill met with resistance in Congress, particularly in the Senate, though it was largely adopted in 1903.

Piñero was appointed Interventor of the Province of San Luis in 1896, following which he participated in negotiations on Argentina's border dispute with Chile. He then began advancing vocational education as a means to foster an infant, though growing, industrial sector, and established a technology school, the Society for Industrial Education, in 1900. His work as Dean of the school earned Piñero an appointment in 1906 as Minister of Education by President José Figueroa Alcorta, a relatively pro-reform conservative who presided over the enactment of many of the nation's first labor laws. Piñero hosted the International Congress of Americanists, in 1910.

Responding to a lack of a uniform body governing ethical practices among Argentine Lawyers, Piñero helped establish the Buenos Aires Bar Association (Colegio de Abogados de Buenos Aires), in 1913, and served as its first president. He was also honored with the presidency of the new, National Commission on Teatro Cervantes, in 1916. Piñero was nominated by the conservative National Concentration alliance to run against the incumbent Radical Civic Union (UCR) in the 1922 elections, though he was defeated by the UCR by around 40%.

Piñero retired from political life, devoting his time to writing numerous texts on Argentine history and law, as well as to the Mitre Institution, a historical society specializing in the life of former President Bartolomé Mitre. Piñero died in 1938, at age 80.
