= Eduardo Laurencena =

Argentine politician (1885–1959)

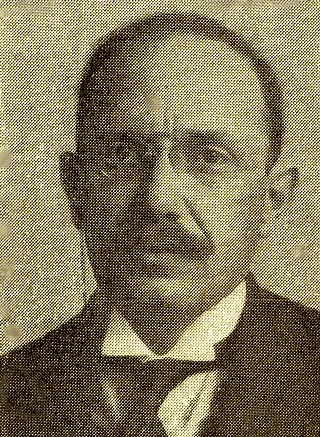
Eduardo Laurencena

Eduardo Laurencena (1885–1959) was an Argentine politician. He served as governor of Entre Ríos Province and was a Senator. His father, Miguel Laurencena, was a governor of the same province.
