= Fugitive Strike Force =

- Country of origin: United States
- No. of seasons: 1
- No. of episodes: 6

Production
- Running time: 60 Minutes

Original release
- Network: Discovery Channel
- Release: September 26 – October 31, 2006

Fugitive Strike Force is a 2006 television series similar to Fox's program Cops. The series shows footage of alleged criminals being arrested by three different corps, the U.S. Marshals, the SWAT and bounty hunters.

== Episodes ==
No.	Title	Original release date
1 (Pilot)	"Officer Down"	September 26, 2006
2	"Shots Fired"	October 3, 2006
3	"On the Run"	October 10, 2006
4	"Repeat Offender"	October 17, 2006
5	"Nothing Left to Lose"	October 24, 2006
6	"Cons and Scams"	October 31, 2006
7	"Multiple Warrants"	2007
8	"Attempted Mayhem"	2007
9	"Hit And Run"	2007
10	"Aloha Marshals"	2007
11	"Zero Tolerance"	2007
12	"Shotgun Effect"	2007
13	"Thicker Than Water"	2007
