= Flexible Support Fund =

UK fund administered by Job Centers to help the unemployed

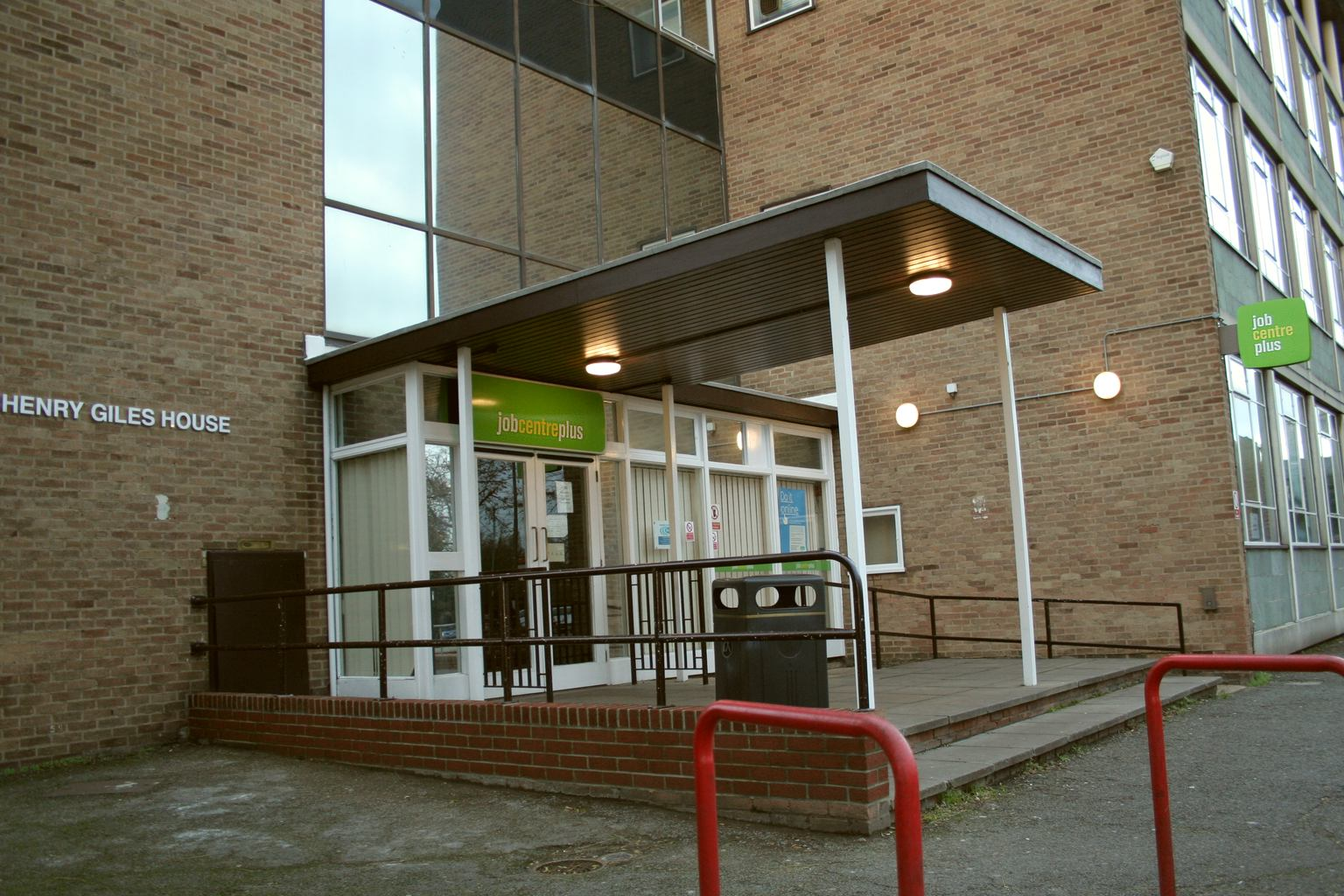
The Flexible Support Fund is administered by individual Job Centres in the United Kingdom.

The Flexible Support Fund (FSF) is a fund in the United Kingdom to aid those in receipt of unemployment benefits to gain employment. It is administered by Job Centres and can be used by individual claimants for the cost of travel to interviews, childcare, tools and clothing and uniforms to start work. However, there is no exhaustive list of things that may be funded under the fund. A second part of the Flexible Support Fund allows District Managers to award funding to "partnership organisations" in order to address barriers to work.

The Flexible Support fund replaces a range of Job Centre Plus schemes including the Deprived Areas Fund, the Adviser Discretion Fund and the Travel to Interview Scheme. Under the Flexible Support Fund Job Centres have greater freedom to tailor their support to local need. Although no figure has published for the total budget for the Flexible Support Fund though a 2011 presentation for Department for Work and Pensions (DWP) external stakeholders stated that the fund would be "about £147 million nationally".

== Eligibility ==
The Fund is not available to those participating in the Work Programme or Work Choice or "other welfare to work" schemes that preceded these.

=== Flexibility ===
The Jobcentre Plus offer Equality Impact Assessment 2011 raised concerns of a "postcode lottery" in the provision of Job Centre services if Job Centre Managers were given too much flexibility under the scheme.

== Reception ==
An undercover investigation published in The Daily Mirror newspaper revealed that DWP civil servants were being told not to mention the fund so as to minimise the number of claims:

"It's a bit like Fight Club - we don't discuss what happens in Fight Club. So you don't talk about flexible support fund either."
