= Federación de Sindicatos Ferroviarios =

FSF
- Federation of Railway Trade Unions
- Federación de Sindicatos Ferroviarios
- Founded: 1922
- Dissolved: 1927
- Location: Argentina
- Key people: Florindo Moretti, Luis Cechini, José Morales
- Affiliations: Unión Sindical Argentina

Federación de Sindicatos Ferroviarios ('Federation of Railway Trade Unions', abbreviated FSF) was a trade union of railway workers in Argentina. FSF was formed in 1922, and was affiliated to the Unión Sindical Argentina. However, it was not a consolidation organization until a constutient congress was held in early 1924.

The cadres of the Communist Party of Argentina were active in FSF since its foundation. The party had characterized the main railway union of the time, Unión Ferroviaria, as a yellow union. Until 1927 all FSF general secretaries and joint secretaries were Communist Party cadres; Florindo Moretti, Luis Cechini and José Morales.

However, in 1927 the relations between the Communist Party and USA soured. The communists withdrew from FSF, and joined Unión Ferroviaria instead. After the split, FSF was dissolved.
