= Victorio Codovilla =

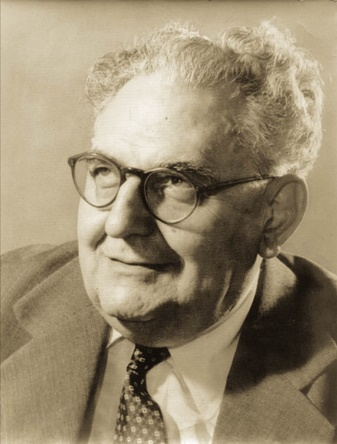

President of the Communist Party of Argentina
- In office 3 March 1963 – 15 April 1970
- Secretary-General: Gerónimo Arnedo Álvarez
- Succeeded by: Fanny Edelman

Secretary-General of the Communist Party of Argentina
- In office 17 November 1941 – 3 March 1963
- Preceded by: Gerónimo Arnedo Álvarez
- Succeeded by: Gerónimo Arnedo Álvarez

Personal details
- Born: Vittorio Codovilla; 4 February 1894 Ottobiano, Lombardy, Kingdom of Italy
- Died: 15 April 1970 (aged 76) Moscow, Russian SFSR, Soviet Union
- Party: Italian Socialist Party (1911–1912); Communist Party of Argentina (1920–1970)

Victorio Codovilla, born Vittorio Codovilla (8 February 1894 – 15 April 1970), was an Italian-born Argentine socialist and later communist politician. At first a member of the Italian Socialist Party, he emigrated to Argentina in 1912 and went on to hold prominent posts in the Comintern and the Communist Party of Argentina (PCA), of which he was General Secretary in 1941–1963 and President in 1963–1970.

== Early life and politics ==
Codovilla was born in Ottobiano in 1894 in to a working-class family and joined the Italian Socialist Party in 1911. He emigrated to Argentina in 1912, where he remained active in international socialist politics. He then joined the Communist Party of Argentina (PCA) in 1920, being elected to its Central Committee and Politburo (on which he would serve until his death in 1970).

In 1924 Codovilla represented the PCA at the Executive Committee of the Communist International (ECCI) in Moscow. Afterwards, he worked for the communist social service organization International Red Aid. In December 1926 he made an address before the ECCI and was made one of its alternate members. Attending the congress of the League Against Imperialism in Brussels in 1927, Codovilla led the eighth congress of the Communist Party of Argentina in 1928 and participated in the first conference of Latin American communist parties in Buenos Aires the following year.

== Comintern advisor in Spain ==
Codovilla was sent to Madrid to advise the Communist Party of Spain on behalf of the Comintern. Under the alias Luis Medina, he presented a paper to the PCE's fourth congress in March 1932, proclaiming that the new Second Republic was supported by monarchism on the right and "social fascists" (such as the members of the Spanish Socialist Workers' Party) on the left. He further predicted that the administration of President Manuel Azaña would quickly become a "clear-cut fascist dictatorship" and stressed the need for Spanish communists to create revolutionary committees and establish Soviets in order to stem the counterrevolution.

With the outbreak of the Spanish Civil War in 1936, Codovilla remained in Madrid advising the PCE, but has been regarded as generally less effective than his Barcelona-based counterpart Ernő Gerő. His position was further eclipsed by the arrival of Boris Stepanov, a favorite of Joseph Stalin, in February 1937. By the summer of 1937 reports to Moscow by fellow Comintern advisor Palmiro Togliatti were critical of both the state of the PCE leadership and Codovilla. In September, Codovilla was recalled to Moscow and superseded by Togliatti.

== General Secretary and President of the PCA ==
Codovilla remained in Moscow until early 1941, when he returned to Argentina. The same year, he was appointed Secretary-General of the Argentine Communist Party; he held this office until March 1963, when he became President of the party. His term as Secretary-General was marked by strong loyalty to the Soviet Union, and opposition to both the regime of Juan Perón and the political development following the 1955 coup d'état which overthrew Perón.

Codovilla attended the 19th Congress of the CPSU in October 1952, which he addressed on behalf of the PCA; Codovilla also represented and spoke for the PCA at the 20th and the 21st congresses of the CPSU, held in 1956 and 1959 respectively. He performed the same functions at the International Meeting of Communist and Workers Parties in November 1957. Codovilla died in Moscow in November 1970.
