= César Milani =

Argentinian military personnel

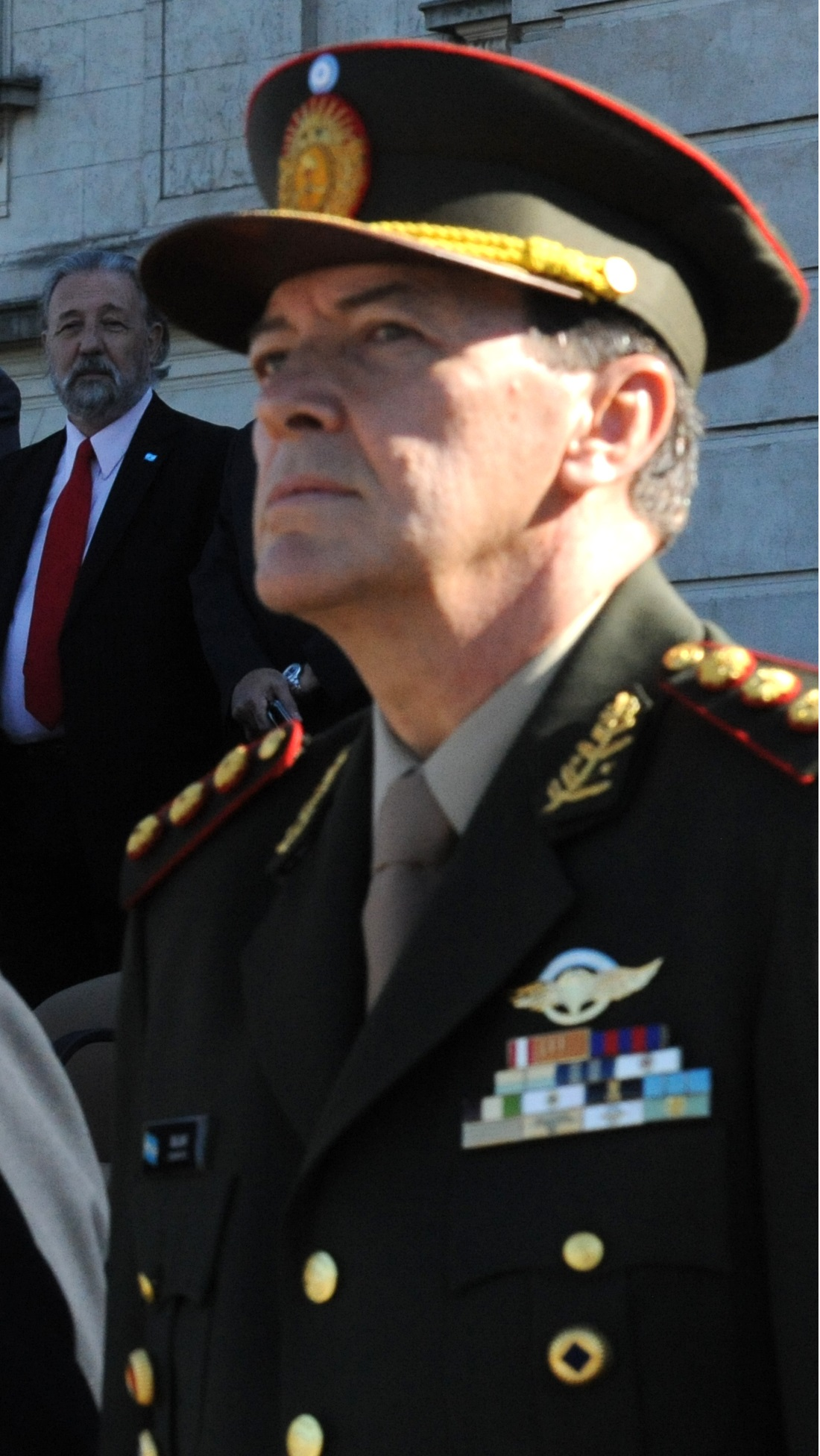
César Milani in 2013

César Santos Gerardo del Corazón de Jesús Milani (born 30 November 1954) is an Argentine military former Chief of Staff of Argentina between 3 July 2013 to 24 June 2015 designated by President Cristina Kirchner. Previously, he was Intelligence Director of the Argentine Army and Deputy Chief of the Army.

== Biography ==
He was born in Cosquin, Córdoba Province. He graduated of the Colegio Militar de la Nación as Second Lieutenant of the Corp of Military engineers.

The designation of Milani sparked controversy due his role about the disappearance, torture and assassination of the private Alberto Ledo during the National Reorganization Process and another cases of kidnappings and torture. He was arrested for being suspected of crimes against humanity in February 2017 but liberated in 2019, when he was found innocent by a Federal Court of La Rioja.

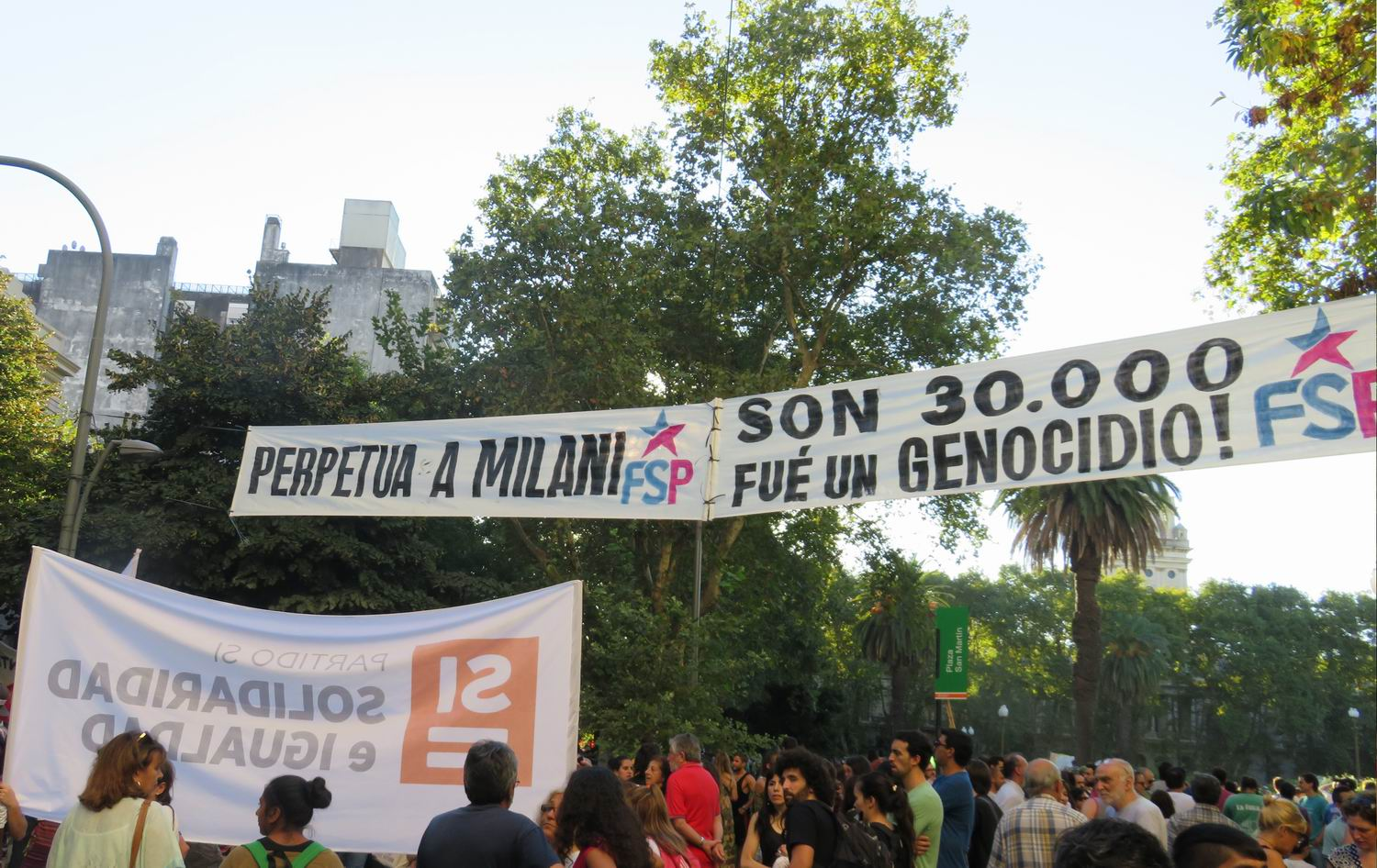
Public manifestations against Milani, claiming life imprisonment for him ("Perpetua a Milani")

Nevertheless, his case was used by the opposition of Cristina Kirchner to show the contradiction about Kirchner's policies about the cases of military people that were suspected of violations of humans rights during the '70s. He is still investigated for illicit enrichment and corruption. Some left groups and humans right groups are still holding up the accusations against Milani, that he always denied and saying they are unaware of the facts about the case Ledo. Also he stated that he was part of an aggression of the opposition because he declared himself as peronist.
