= Miguel Laurencena =

Argentine lawyer and politician

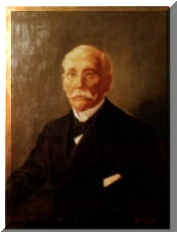
Portrait of Miguel Laurencena

Miguel M. Laurencena (February 27, 1851 – February 3, 1928) was an Argentine lawyer and politician. He served as governor of Entre Ríos Province.

== Biography ==
Born in Buenos Aires, he was the son of Martin G. Laurencena and Margarita Eyaragaray, citizens of Gualeguay. Laurencena completed his primary studies in Gualeguay, and secondary (Colegio del Caballito) and university studies in the city of Buenos Aires, where he became a lawyer. In 1881, he was elected mayor of the City of Gualeguay. In 1883 he was elected provincial deputy, and the same year appointed Minister of Government of the Province of Entre Ríos, under General Eduardo Racedo. In 1885, he obtained a loan from Britain to build a railroad. Between 1886 and 1892 he served as national deputy, representing the people of Entre Ríos.

He joined the Unión Cívica in 1889 under Leandro Alem; he was later involved with the Revolution of the Park in the summer of 1890 and was one of the founders of the Unión Cívica Radical in 1891, whose newspaper, El Argentino, he actively participated. He organized radicalism in the province of Entre Ríos, and took part in the Revolutions of 1893 and 1905, the latter of which resulted in his arrest and imprisonment.

In 1914, he was elected Governor of the Province of Entre Ríos, with Luis L. Etchevehere as lieutenant governor. From the time Hipólito Yrigoyen was elected president of Argentina in 1916, Laurencena expressed opposition, and with the Unión Cívica Radical in the years up to his death he actively campaigned nationally for change, joined the group of radical leaders who formed the Unión Cívica Radical Antipersonalista in 1924. The Radical President Marcelo T. de Alvear appointed him Minister of the Supreme Court by decree of December 5, 1924, a post he held until his death in 1928.

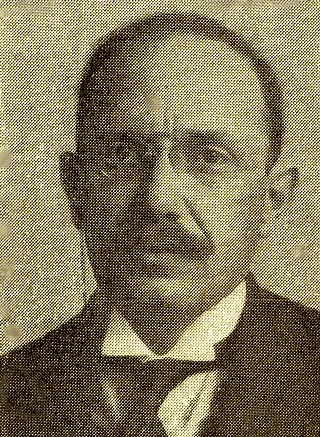
Eduardo Laurencena

One of his sons, Eduardo, was a national senator and also served as governor of Entre Ríos Province.
