= Communist Party of Argentina =

Far-left political party in Argentina

Communist Party of Argentina Partido Comunista de la Argentina
- Abbreviation: PCA
- General Secretary: Jorge Kreyness
- Founded: 6 January 1918
- Split from: Socialist Party
- Headquarters: Buenos Aires
- Youth wing: Communist Youth Federation
- Membership (2016): 22,523
- Ideology: Communism; Marxism–Leninism
- Political position: Far-left
- National affiliation: Citizen's Unity (2017–2019); Frente de Todos (2019–2023); Homeland Force (since 2023)
- Regional affiliation: São Paulo Forum
- International affiliation: IMCWP; World Anti-Imperialist Platform; Sovintern
- Colors: Red and Yellow
- Senate: 0 / 72
- Chamber: 0 / 257

Website
- pca.org.ar

The Communist Party of Argentina (Spanish: Partido Comunista de la Argentina, abbr. PCA) is a Marxist-Leninist party in Argentina. It is a member of Homeland Force.

It was founded on 6 January 1918 as the International Socialist Party, after a split within the Socialist Party between those who supported and those who opposed the Russian October Revolution and the Third International. From its inception, the party maintained an alignment with the Communist Party of the Soviet Union, which generated friction with the rest of Argentina's left, which accused the party of struggling more for the geopolitical interests of the Soviet Union than the effective emergence of a communist revolution in Argentina.

== History ==
=== Foundation and early history ===
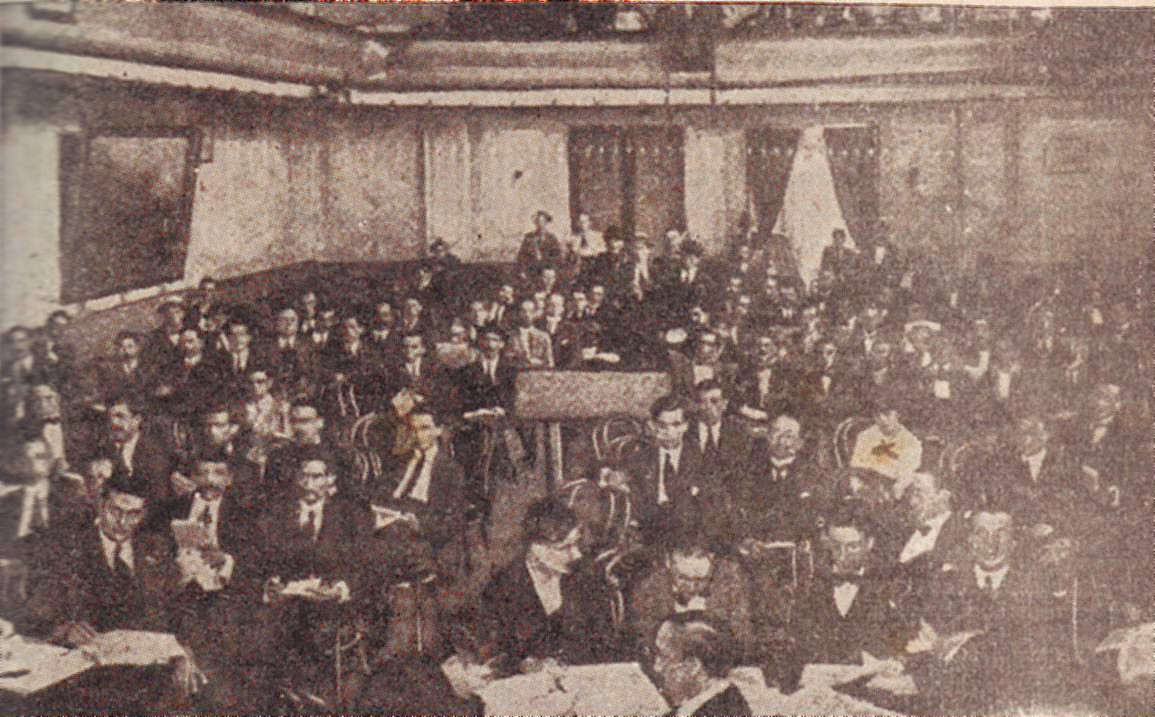
Founding congress of the party, held on 6 January 1918

Following the October Revolution and the rise of Bolsheviks to power in Russia, tensions between the reformist and the revolutionary factions of Argentina's Socialist Party (Partido Socialista, PS) reached its breaking point. On 6 January 1918, following the PS' refusal to endorse the Bolshevik coup, the revolutionary faction split from the Socialist Party and formed the International Socialist Party (Partido Socialista Internacional, PSI). The party changed its name to the Communist Party of Argentina (Partido Comunista de la Argentina, PCA) two months later.

From its inception, the PCA followed the political line of the Communist Party of the Soviet Union, supporting its initiatives and joining the Communist International (Comintern) in 1919. Its alignment with the CPSU during the Stalinist period earned it numerous criticisms by other parties within Argentina's political left. The PCA suffered several splits throughout the 1920s, with a number of factions emerging including the frentistas in 1923, the chispistas (pre-Trotskyists) in 1925, and the penelonistas (supporters of Nikolai Bukharin) in 1928.

The PCA organized the sending of volunteers to the International Brigades and other resources to the Second Spanish Republic during the Spanish Civil War. Victorio Codovilla, who led the PCA's eighth congress in 1928, advised the Communist Party of Spain (PCE) on behalf of the Comintern during this period. He was also responsible for organizing local NKVD agents in Spain and directing the persecution, torture, and murder of militant anarchists, members of the Workers Party of Marxist Unification, and other opponents of the PCE in the International Brigades. The party actively supported the Soviet Union during World War II by organizing aid collections and having its leaders contribute to various international tasks under the orders of Moscow. For example, Codovilla was responsible for organizing the murder of Leon Trotsky in Mexico in 1940; by this time he had earned the full confidence of the Soviet leadership.

=== From Peronism to the 1976 dictatorship ===
As a result of the workers' mobilizations of 17 October 1945 against the dismissal and detention of Juan Domingo Perón, within the party there were questions to the political line of the same and to the leadership headed by Codovilla and in the National Conference of December of that year, Rodolfo Puiggrós openly expressed criticism and demanded to find practical agreements with Perón around the defense of the interests of the workers and the fight against imperialism.

In the elections of 1946, the Communist Party was part of the Democratic Union, opposed to Peronism. Puiggrós was expelled in 1947 and founded the Communist Workers Movement together with some communist syndicalists supporters of the alliance with Peronism.

The student of chemistry and communist militant Ernesto Mario Bravo was kidnapped at his home on 17 June 1951 and tortured by the police. His case was reported by the doctor who treated him, first in the Special Section and then in a fifth where he was transferred. The government, however, emphatically denied the facts:

«Negó la desaparición de Bravo, negó las torturas, denunció todo como una maniobra opositora y hasta el Consejo Superior del Partido Peronista insistió que el episodio entero había sido 'una confabulación con el propósito de subvertir el orden'. Y cuando la decisión judicial hizo innegable todo lo que se había negado, apretó los tornillos de los medios periodísticos para echar sobre el tema una espesa vaharada de desinformación y movió los magistrados necesarios para exculpar a los torturadores. Al defenderlos hizo suyas sus culpas, las endosó, lo que revela la tremenda insensibilidad que se había instalado en las estructuras oficiales. Maltratar a un ciudadano era perdonable, si por añadidura era un comunista, entonces era un servicio a premiar. Pues -no hace falta decirlo- Lombilla y sus colaboradores regresaron a sus puestos y fueron ascendidos, como corresponde».

On 17 June 1955, the police of Rosario arrested, tortured and disappeared Juan Ingallinella, a doctor and party leader, who had participated in the publication of pamphlets in defense of the government days before, denouncing the masterminds of the bombing and strafing of the Plaza de Mayo, in which more than 350 people were killed and more than 700 wounded and mutilated.

After the overthrow of Perón, the party criticized the loss of democratic liberties and the prohibition of the partisans who carried out the coup of 1955. Although Peronism was the main objective of the persecutions, the increase of the repression in the government Arambruru also led him to repress the members of the Communist Party. In 1956 the Ministry of the Interior, Eduardo Busso, denounced that the Union of Argentine Women and the Argentine League for Human Rights had links with the party. In April of the following year, the cancellation of legal status was announced and 360 militants were arrested and 56 local supporters closed.

Adhered to the thesis of the XX Congress of the CPSU, which postulated the peaceful transition to socialism through the electoral route, among other points. In 1967 it underwent the biggest organized split in its history, which would lead to 4,000 members to separate, later forming the Revolutionary Communist Party, on 6 January 1968.

During the 1970s, the policy of the guerrilla movements in Latin America did not follow. Before the crisis of the government of Isabel Perón and the imminence of a military coup, the PCA began to "promote a joint, unitary, of the political parties, of the Church and of the Armed Forces towards the establishment of a civic-military cabinet ", says that later it would turn into the claim of a" civic-military convergence ".

The Central Committee of the PCA 27 28 did not condemn the coup d'état of 1976 and the consequent military dictatorship established at the beginning.26 29 30 31 32 A few days after the coup, an official publication of the PCA affirmed with respect to the new president: "Regarding his more precise formulations ... we affirm emphatically that they constitute the basis of a liberating program that we share .... he affirms that no easy, miraculous or spectacular solutions will be given, be assured that nobody expects them ... General Videla does not ask for adhesion, but understanding, he has it ".33 This position was based on a political characterization that "presented the Videla-Viola duo as the wing of renewed democracy, in front of a Pinochet wing, a non-predominant sector within the Armed Forces, channeled through Emilio Massera and Luciano Menéndez" and coincided with the support that the government of the Soviet Union offered the military dictatorship.31 26 This characterization was not easily accepted by all its militancy, which, between internal discussions, was distributed among those who trusted the word of the leaders and those who preferred to act for your account or refusing to accept directions from the addresses.34

The PCA was not affected by laws 21,322, 21,323 and 21,325 that dissolved some parties and left groups; its activity was suspended and, according to the report of the IACHR, like nine other political parties, it was subjected to "flexible government behavior" and was received in interviews by the military government.35 Despite this, a large number of PCA militants were persecuted, tortured, murdered and disappeared during the dictatorship.

Alberto Nadra affirms that the accusations made by the PCA before the IACHR allowed for the first time this organism to assume the existence of "state terrorism" in Argentina, taking as "pilot case" that of the student Inés Ollero, as well as the detention of almost 1,600 militants, the kidnapping of more than 500 and the murder of 150, show the objective resistance to the dictatorship, regardless of the public position of the PC.

In taking stock of this period on the occasion of the 30th anniversary of the coup d'état, the PCA issued a statement in which it stated: "each force in its own way, it cost us all to understand the novelty of the dictatorship imposed by the Yankees and supported by a vast political and social space ... We made mistakes in assessing the internal contradictions of the Armed Forces, overestimating them and considering taking advantage of them in the fight against fascism. the actions in progress and the level of hegemony that the most pro-imperialist sectors had reached from the start. ... We are not, as we know and we do not hide, an infallible force neither in the sayings nor in the behaviors, but we are proud of belonging to a party that resisted the attacks of the dictatorship with dignity and that gave its contribution to the solidarity struggle from the first day, in the interior of the country and also in n the outside ".

The PCA appeared as a plaintiff in two criminal cases against State terrorism exercised by the dictatorship. One of those causes is that of the Floreal case Edgardo Avellaneda, known as "el Negrito", born in Rosario on 14 May 1961. He was a militant of the Communist Youth Federation and was in charge of the propaganda tasks in his neighborhood. He lived with his mother Iris Etelvina Pereyra de Avellaneda and his father Floreal Avellaneda, delegate of the Tensa textile factory, both militants of the Communist Party. He was 15 years old when he was abducted from his home with his mother, he was illegally detained and tortured. His body was found on 14 May 1976 in the waters of the Río de la Plata. His body was found with serious signs of having suffered physical torture and having been the victim of impalement.

=== 21st-century history ===
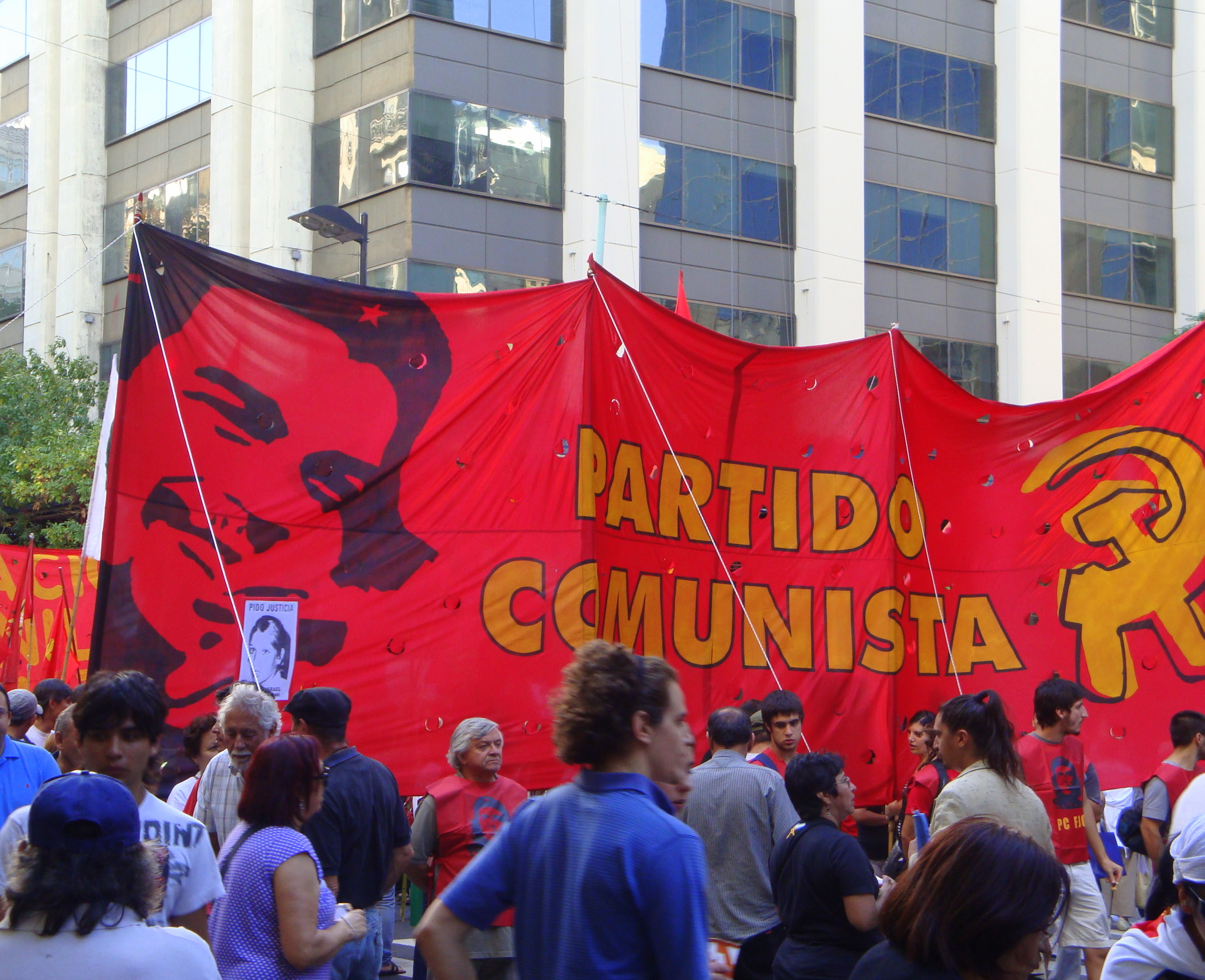
The PCA during the commemoration of the 34th anniversary of the 1976 coup d'état.

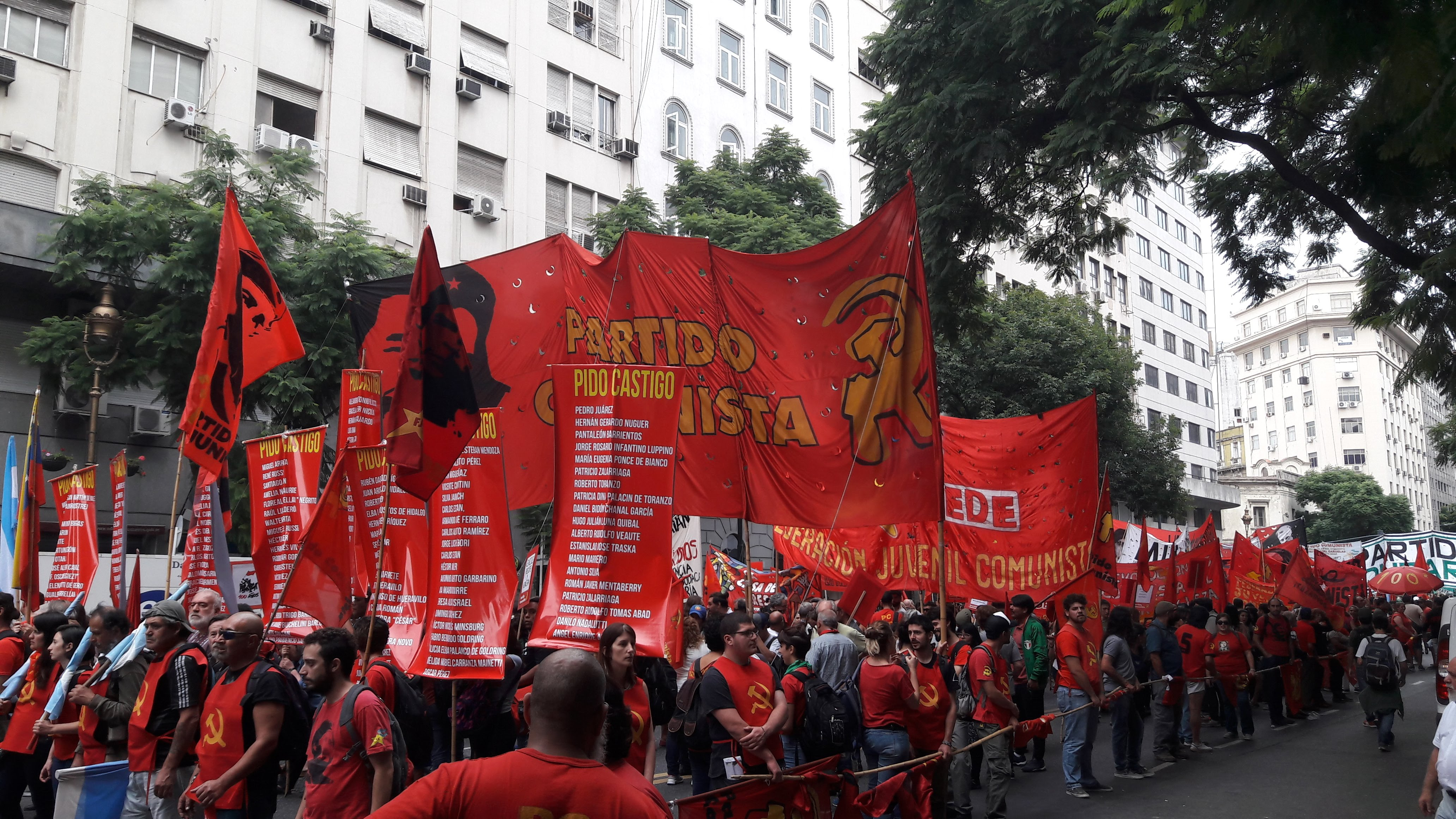
PCA on the 42nd anniversary of the 1976 coup d'état.

In the 2007 Argentine general election, the party formed an alliance with the Humanist Party called FRAL (“'Broad Front for Latin American Unity”'), which nominated Humanist Luis Alberto Ammann as its candidate, obtaining 0.41% of the popular vote.

In 2008, its secretary general, Patricio Echegaray, participated in the Forum in Defence of the Public Sector in opposition to the conservative policies of Mauricio Macri as head of the Government of the City of Buenos Aires, together with political leaders from different parties such as Aníbal Ibarra, Carlos Heller, the humanist Lía Méndez, the Peronist Diego Kravetz, the socialist Raúl Puy and the Christian Democrat Carlos Traboulsi, among others.

This led the PCA, together with political forces from the Buenos Aires centre-left, to decide to support the candidacy for National Deputy of former communist militant Carlos Heller for the 2009 Argentine legislative election.

In the province of Buenos Aires, the party established alliances with former communist militant Martín Sabbatella, a renowned leader and mayor of the municipality of Morón, described by the American newspaper The Wall Street Journal as one of the most honest and efficient Latin American political leaders in the fight against corruption. The front that emerged from this alliance in the province of Buenos Aires was called Nuevo Encuentro.

When the government of President Cristina Fernández wanted to implement a series of measures in the agricultural and livestock sector, including a policy of sliding-scale export taxes, the Communist Party supported the decision and participated in an official mobilisation against the 2008 Argentine agrarian strike organised by the Argentine Rural Society (SRA), the Argentine Agrarian Federation (FAA), the Argentine Rural Confederations (CRA) and CONINAGRO.

On regional issues, the party rejected the 2009 Honduran coup d'état and supported all calls to reject it. It also rejected the formation of the Metropolitan Police force under the command of former police chief Jorge Palacios.

The PCA supported other measures and proclamations by Cristina Fernández's government, such as the bill to create a new broadcasting law, the Universal Child Allowance, the appointment of Néstor Kirchner to the General Secretariat of UNASUR, the nationalisation of pensions that were previously under the management of private companies (a long-standing demand of the PCA during the 1990s), the nationalisation of Aguas Argentinas and Aerolíneas Argentinas, the request for speedy trials against repressors and in favour of victims of state terrorism, the systematic creation of collective labour agreements to guarantee the participation of workers in wage discussions, and all those proclamations and international treaties that emphasise Latin American unity. Ahead of the 2011 Argentine general election, the party supported the candidacy of Cristina Fernández de Kirchner.

In the 2011 Argentine general election, it was part of the Frente para la Victoria alliance, supporting the candidacy of Cristina Fernández de Kirchner, who was re-elected with 54.11% of the vote.

However, the party has been critical of other measures, such as the Political Reform Law, considering that it limits the actions of smaller parties, the Anti-Terrorism Law or the appointment of César Milani as Chief of the Army.

Ahead of the 2015 Argentine Parlasur elections, the party's secretary general joined the Frente para la Victoria lists as a candidate for deputy in the Mercosur Parliament.

In the 2019 2019 Santa Fe provincial elections, the party presented its independent candidacy in the city of San Jorge, where it won one council seat. It also won council seats in other cities.

In 2019, the party joined Frente de Todos, a coalition based on the convergence of four major political sectors: the Justicialist Party (Peronist), which has the largest number of members in the country, the Peronist and non-Peronist sectors that make up Kirchnerism led by former President Cristina Fernández de Kirchner, the majority of Peronist governors, and the Frente Renovador led by Sergio Massa (Peronist), which is also joined by sectors that have broken away from Massism (Peronist), the Movimiento Evita (Peronist), Proyecto Sur led by Pino Solanas, SOMOS, the party of MP Victoria Donda, radical sectors such as the National Alfonsinist Movement led by deputy Leopoldo Moreau and the FORJA, led by Gustavo Fernando López, the Socialist Party for the Victory of Buenos Aires, led by Jorge Rivas, the Solidary Party led by Carlos Heller, New Encounter led by Martín Sabbatella, the Patria Grande Front led by Juan Grabois, among other political forces.

In 2023, the party became a member of the Peronist alliance Union for the Homeland, describing the coalition as "a space that can put the current debates on the agenda, fundamentally the need to exit the co-government agreement with the IMF and embark on a sovereign course for the next four years so that workers can rebuild their purchasing power and strengthen sovereignty over our natural resources".

On 22 January 2024, the long-time leader of the party, Victor Kot, had died.

The party welcomed the victory of Fuerza Patria in the 2025 Buenos Aires provincial election. The general secretary of the party, Jorge Kreyness, praised Fuerza Patria as a political force that "puts a strong limit to the destruction that the government headed by Javier Milei is carrying out in our country" and which creates "better conditions to continue fighting on all fronts and build an antagonistic alternative to ultra-liberalism and neo-fascism".

In the 2025 Argentine legislative election, the party called "on all working people to vote for Fuerza Patria".

== Ideology ==
The demands of the party include "upholding the defense of sovereignty, disavowal of the foreign debt, expansion of labor rights, development of national and worker-managed industry, imposition of progressive taxes on large corporations to expand and improve public education and health care, worker participation in the profits of private companies, the reduction of the workday without a pay cut, the re-nationalization of the Port of Quequén, the Atucha Nuclear Power Plant, and the Paraná-Paraguay Trunk Waterway." The party's minimum program within the Peronist Fuerza Patria that it is a member of, consists of "genuine judicial reform, a distributive shock, a tariff freeze, suspension of debt payments, and the nationalization of natural resources as key issues."

In reaction to the Russian invasion of Ukraine, the Communist Party declared that it "rejects the imperialist policies of the United States and the expansion of NATO towards Eastern Europe and particularly on the border with Russia," and condemned anti-war and anti-Russian positions, arguing that "calling for Russia to “cease military actions in Ukraine” is nothing more than a dangerous and growing alignment with the policies of the US and the international organizations that this country controls, as is the case with the negotiations and conditions imposed by the IMF."

In face of the rising tensions between Venezuela and USA in October 2025, the party affirmed its support for the Venezuelan government, and declared an "initiative to establish international brigades in Argentina to fight alongside our Bolivarian brothers in Venezuela".

The party expressed its support for the People's Republic of China, writing: "Almost a quarter of the world's population lives under socialist conditions. China is at the forefront not only in scientific, technical, military, and industrial development, but above all, in meeting the material needs of working people. It is the only country to have eliminated extreme poverty, with extremely high employment rates, 90% of its population owning their own homes, and with education and healthcare systems accessible free of charge to the entire population."

== National Congresses ==
- I Congress – held in 1918
- II Congress – held in May 1919, the party breaks with the Second International
- III Congress – held in December 1920
- IV Congress – held in January 1922
- V Congress – held in July 1923
- VI Congress – held in July 1924
- VII Congress – held in December 1925
- VIII Congress – held in November 1928
- IX Congress – held in January 1938
- X Congress – held in November 1941
- XI Congress – held in 1946
- XII Congress – held in 1963
- XIII Congress – held between 25 and 29 March 1969
- XIV Congress – held on 22 August 1973, the party resolves to support the candidacy of Perón in the September 1973 presidential election.
- XV Congress – held on 6 July 1982
- XVI Congress – held in 1986
- XVII Congress – held in 1990
- Extraordinary Congress – held 1996, a group of militants breaks with the party and forms the PCCE

== See also ==
- Communist Party of Argentina (Extraordinary Congress)
- Federación de Sindicatos Ferroviarios
- Politicians of the Communist Party of Argentina
