= 2013 Argentine legislative election =

- 27 October 2013
- Chamber of Deputies
- 127 of the 257 seats in the Chamber of Deputies
- Turnout: 79.77%
Party	Vote %	Seats
Front for Victory	33.05	47
Progressive, Civic and Social Front	24.21	36
Renewal Front	17.56	16
Federal Peronism	8.29	12
PRO Union	7.54	11
Workers' Left Front	5.20	3
Neuquén People's Movement	0.58	2
This lists parties that won seats. See the complete results below.
- Senate
- 24 of the 72 seats in the Senate
- Turnout: 78.26%
Party	Vote %	Seats
Front for Victory	39.28	14
Progressive, Civic and Social Front	23.28	3
PRO Union	18.38	3
Federal Peronism	3.25	1
Neuquén People's Movement	2.78	2
Fuegian People's Movement	0.31	1
This lists parties that won seats. See the complete results below.
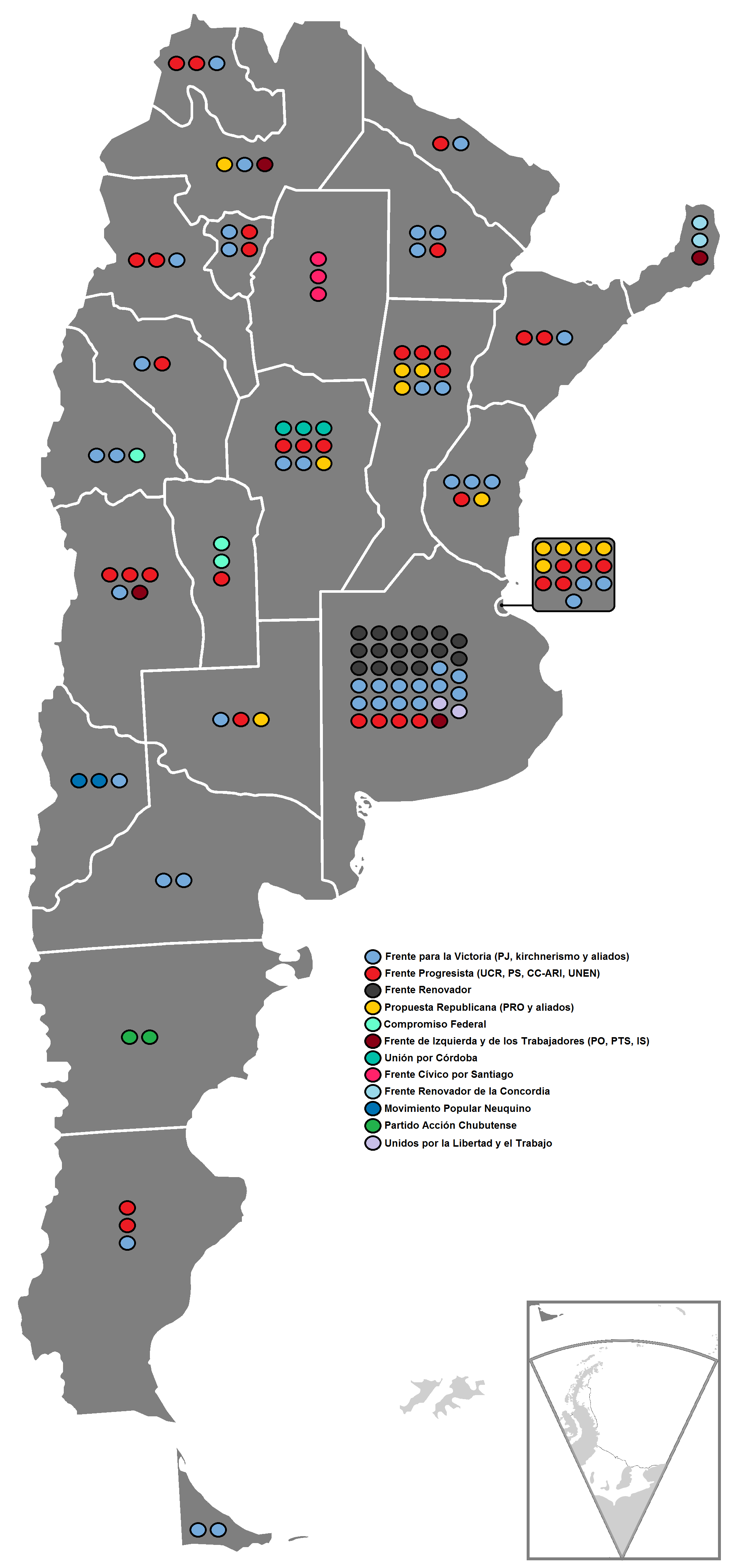
Chamber of Deputies results by province

Legislative elections were held in Argentina on 27 October 2013. Open primary elections (PASO) were previously held on 11 August 2013 to determine eligible party lists for the general election. As in 2011 – when such primaries were held for the first time – each party list had to reach a 1.5% threshold at the provincial level in order to proceed to the 27 October polls.

The elections renewed half of the members of the Chamber of Deputies for the period 2013–2017 and a third of the members of the Senate for the period 2013–2019. Chamber of Deputies (Lower House) elections were held in every district; Senate elections were, in turn, held in the provinces of Chaco, Entre Ríos, Neuquén, Río Negro, Salta, Santiago del Estero, and Tierra del Fuego, as well as in the City of Buenos Aires. Corrientes Province held the only elections for governor in 2013, doing so on 15 September.

These elections included two significant novelties. Following the enactment of a law to that effect in 2012, voluntary suffrage was extended to voters age 16 and 17, which enfranchised an additional 4.5% of the population, or about 1.2 million people; of this total, approximately 600,000 registered to vote. Argentine voters in 2013 also parted with the traditional election-day seal stamped on National Identity Documents (DNI) by election officials, receiving instead a ballot stub with a bar code and serial number.

== Background ==
President Cristina Fernández de Kirchner was reelected in 2011, and the Kirchnerist Front for Victory (FpV) rode her coattails in gubernatorial and congressional races alike. Following the elections, however, foreign exchange controls, austerity measures, persistent inflation, and downturns in Brazil, Europe, and other important trade partners, resulted in a sudden downturn and a consequent erosion of the president's popularity. A series of cacerolazos organized by opponents of the government took place during 2012 and 2013 (13S, 8N, 18A, and 8A).

The recession was shorter and shallower than much of the local media had predicted, however; and while the FpV entered the 2013 campaign season with sounder footing on pocketbook issues, they were dogged by ongoing speculation that their caucus sought a two-thirds majority in the Lower House with the goal of amending the Constitution to allow the president to seek a third term. A survey conducted in June 2013 by the consulting firm CEIS gave the Front for Victory (the majority party in Congress, as well as the party in power since 2003) 30.3% in the City of Buenos Aires and 39.7% in the Province of Buenos Aires (the largest electoral district). The right-wing PRO polled at 23.4% and 16.7%, respectively; the Federal Peronists and other PJ party lists opposed to Kirchnerism, 10.3% and 16.7%; the centrist Civic Coalition, 9.2% and 5.0%; and the center-left UCR, 7.4% and 8.0%.

The FpV, moreover, had the advantage of having relatively few Lower House seats at stake in 2013. Congressmen in Argentina serve four-year terms, and gains for the various opposition parties in 2009 meant that 2013 put a disproportionate number of their Lower House seats at stake: while the FpV contested 38 of its 116 Lower House seats, a full 76 of 118 opposition seats were at stake this year (a further 13 seats of the 23 belonging to minor parties allied with the FpV were at stake).

== Primaries ==
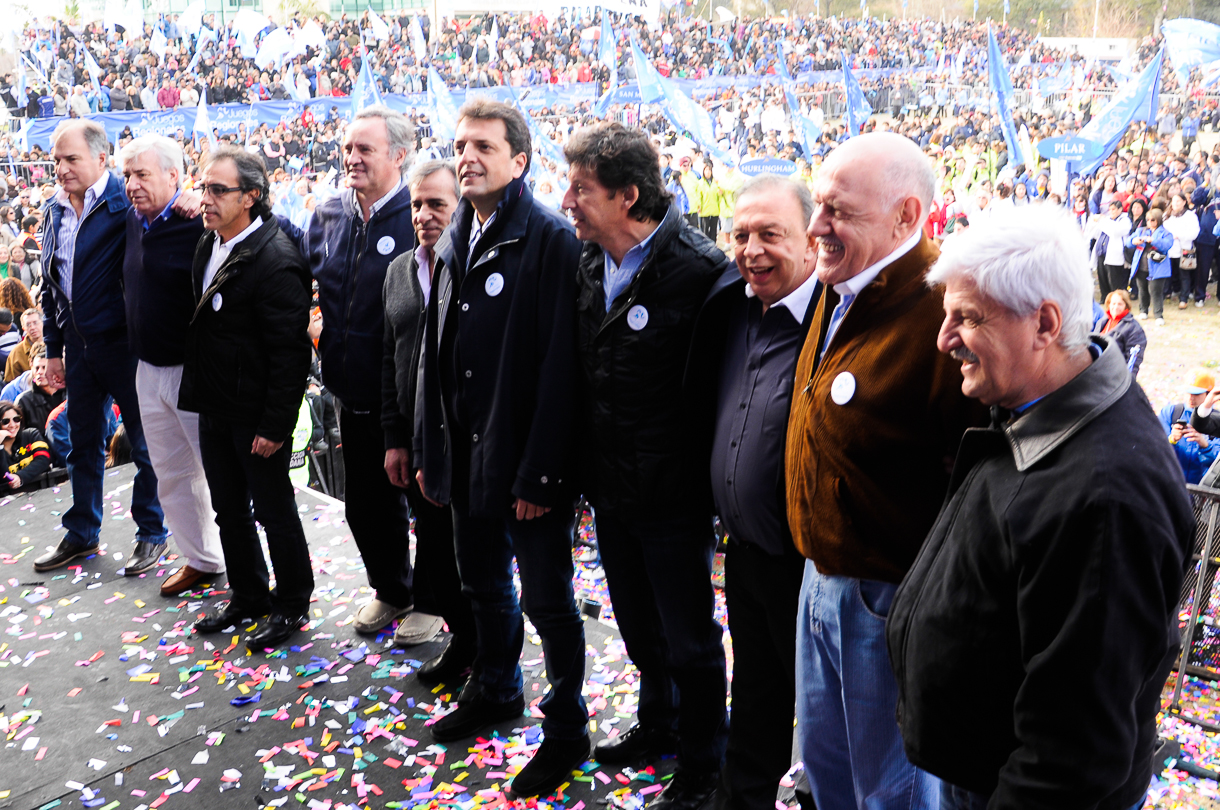
Sergio Massa (5th from right) caps a campaign rally with his fellow Renewal Front candidates. Their party list won in Buenos Aires Province, the nation's largest. The balance of power in Congress was largely unchanged, however, and the Front for Victory maintained their working majority in both houses.

The PASO primaries were held on Sunday, 11 August, amid high turnout consistent with recent past elections and estimated by Interior Minister Florencio Randazzo at over 70%.

The Province of Buenos Aires, the largest electoral district and home to 3 out of 8 Argentines, dominated campaign news much as it has in every mid-term election in recent years. As the party list filing deadline on 22 June drew near, the spotlight focused on the popular mayor of Tigre, Sergio Massa. Massa had been elected mayor on the FpV slate, and had served in a number of high-ranking posts in the administrations of both Cristina Kirchner and her predecessor and husband, the late Néstor Kirchner. His relationship with the Kirchners had been a difficult one, however, and though polling gave him better prospects running for Congress under the FpV party list than on a separate slate, Massa ultimately opted to form his own Frente Renovador (Renewal Front) ticket with the support of the 'Group of 8' Buenos Aires Province Mayors and others, notably former Argentine Industrial Union president José Ignacio de Mendiguren (an ally of Kirchnerism).

Massa's decision to run as an opponent deprived the FpV of a key ally and he moved quickly to consolidate the center-right vote in Buenos Aires Province by obtaining the endorsement of the PRO (which ran on the Renewal Front list headed by Massa rather than on its own). Federal Peronist Congressman Francisco de Narváez, who would be in direct competition with the Renewal Front for the province's large center-right Peronist vote, believed that the charismatic Massa was in reality a "trojan horse" for the FpV; Renewal Front congressmen, per his reasoning, would run against Kirchnerism only to vote with them once elected to Congress. The Renewal Front, in any case, ultimately defeated the FpV list headed by Lomas de Zamora Mayor Martín Insaurralde by about 35% to 30%, with the Progressive, Civic and Social Front (FPCyS) list headed by Congressmen Margarita Stolbizer and Ricardo Alfonsín and Congressman de Narváez's Front for Union and Work list receiving about 11% each; were this result to be mirrored in October, de Narváez would lose four of eight congressmen he led in 2009 on the successful Unión/PRO list.

The centrist Civic Coalition ARI, for its part, arguably achieved its most significant political victory in four years when Congressman Alfonso Prat-Gay forged the Civic Coalition-led Juntos UNEN (Together They Unite) alliance with UCR Congressional caucus leader Ricardo Gil Lavedra, leftist Proyecto Sur leader Pino Solanas, former Civic Coalition head Elisa Carrió (who left the CC in 2012 following a poor showing in the 2011 presidential race), and Victoria Donda of the leftist Freemen of the South Movement in January 2013. Prat-Gay was nominated as the lead UNEN candidate for a seat in the Argentine Senate for the City of Buenos Aires (where the alliance was strongest), and Gil Lavedra the lead UNEN candidate for the Lower House; former Economy Minister Martín Lousteau (who fell out with President Fernández de Kirchner after his 2008 dismissal) joined Gil Lavedra and Carrió on the UNEN Lower House list for the city.

The City of Buenos Aires, ruled since 2007 by a PRO mayor, handed the rightist PRO an upset by giving UNEN standard-bearers Prat-Gay and Solanas the two Senate seats (out of three) accorded to the winning list in each district, edging out former Vice-Mayor Gabriela Michetti (who would obtain the third seat) and current City Environment Minister Diego Santilli, and costing FpV Senator Daniel Filmus his own seat. The PRO party list for the city's delegation to the Lower House, headed by Rabbi Sergio Bergman (a member of the Buenos Aires City Legislature) and Bank of the City of Buenos Aires director Federico Sturzenegger, was likewise defeated by the UNEN list headed by Congressmen Gil Lavedra and Carrió. The FpV list led by Legislator Juan Cabandié, came in third.

Córdoba Province, where Governor José Manuel de la Sota broke with the president after being elected with her endorsement, is where the acrimony between these Peronist factions was probably most acute. De la Sota fielded former Governor Juan Schiaretti as the head of his Lower House party list. Their Union for Córdoba list bested the UCR list headed by Congressman Oscar Aguad, the PRO list headed by former football referee Héctor Baldassi, the FpV list headed by former National University of Córdoba rector Carina Scotto, and the "It's Possible" list headed by former Economy Minister Domingo Cavallo with the support of neighboring San Luis Province Senator Alberto Rodríguez Saá (a Federal Peronist). Cavallo, who ran as a conservative and lost much of his political base as economy minister during the 2001 crisis, failed to reach the requisite 1.5% threshold to advance to the 27 October general election.

Santa Fe Province voted in the PASO election amid mourning for the 15 or more fatal victims claimed by the Rosario gas explosion on 6 August. Voters there gave the Progressive, Civic and Social Front list headed by former Governor Hermes Binner a victory over the PRO list headed by comedian Miguel del Sel and the FpV list headed by former Governor Jorge Obeid; the Socialist Party, to which Binner and the current governor, Antonio Bonfatti, belongs, is strongest in this province.

Mendoza Province gave the UCR list headed by former Governor and Vice President Julio Cobos a victory over the FpV list headed by Guaymallén Department Mayor Alejandro Abraham. Cobos is probably best remembered for his surprise, tie-breaking vote in 2008 against a bill raising oilseed export taxes; though not an oilseed-producing province, conservative politics have historically been strong in Mendoza, and Cobos' unexpected axing of the measure was widely supported in his province.

The PASO primaries thus gave congressional candidates on the Front for Victory (FpV) list a much reduced share of the popular vote (around 30%, compared to 57% in 2011), and the FpV led in only 10 of 23 provinces. They retained a plurality of the vote, however, and by virtue of having only 37 Lower House seats at stake, will likely increase their parliamentary majority by two. The UCR and FPCyS together totaled around 24%, with the latter likely losing around 5 seats due to the large number of seats at stake. The FpV fared better in most Senate races, losing only in the City of Buenos Aires while winning in Chaco, Entre Ríos, Río Negro, Salta, Santiago del Estero, and Tierra del Fuego Provinces; like in the Lower House races, their popular vote for Senate races fell sharply (from 54% to 34%), but their 8% advantage over the UCR and FPCyS combined and their improved showing in Tierra del Fuego compensated their loss of support elsewhere. The Neuquén People's Movement that has dominated politics in Neuquén Province since the 1960s and caucuses with the FpV in Congress, won in a landslide.

=== Senate ===
The 11 August 2013 open, simultaneous and obligatory primary elections (PASO) for the Senate were held in eight provinces.

Party	Votes	%
Kirchnerists and allies	1,746,625	33.96
Radical Civic Union (UCR), Socialist Party and allies	1,356,419	26.37
Republican Proposal (PRO) and allies	779,404	15.16
Others (incl. Neuquén People's Movement)	494,924	9.62
Left-wing (incl. Workers' Party)	320,208	6.23
Dissident Peronists	213,676	4.15
Against all		
Total		

=== Chamber of Deputies ===
Party	Votes	%
Kirchnerists and allies	6,799,793	29.65
Dissident Peronists (incl. Renewal Front)	5,903,016	25.74
Radical Civic Union, Socialist Party and allies	5,460,861	23.81
Republican Proposal and allies	1,525,995	6.65
Left-wing (Workers' Left Front, Self-determination and Freedom etc.)	1,243,252	5.42
Others (incl. Neuquén People's Movement)	802,019	3.50
Against all		
Total		

== Results ==
The results closely mirrored the primary elections. The Renewal Front (center/center-right Peronists) received a plurality of votes in Buenos Aires Province (the nation's largest), while the Front for Victory (left-wing Peronists) and allies maintained their majority in both houses of Congress with minimal changes in the party composition of either chamber. Turnout was high, and was estimated to have reached 76%.

Cristina Fernández de Kirchner, serving a second presidency, is constitutionally barred from standing in the 2015 election, and the Front for Victory lacks the special two-thirds majority needed to convene a constitutional convention. The support for Front for Victory dropped from 54% in 2011 to 33% in 2013. The government faces increasing popular discontent, and the vice-president Amado Boudou (currently acting as president while Fernández de Kirchner recuperates after surgery) is under investigation for the so-called Boudougate. Analysts for the BBC consider the poll results suggest Sergio Massa, Mauricio Macri and Daniel Scioli are likely candidates for the presidency in 2015.

=== Chamber of Deputies ===
Party or alliance		Votes	%	Seats
Party or alliance		Votes	%	Won
Front for Victory	Front for Victory	6,879,156	29.55	40
Front for Victory	Civic Front for Santiago	357,792	1.54	3
Front for Victory	Front for the Renewal of Concord	260,034	1.12	2
Front for Victory	Justicialist Party (Salta)	121,084	0.52	1
Front for Victory	Victory Party	48,349	0.21	0
Front for Victory	Popular Solidarity Movement	16,070	0.07	1
Front for Victory	Humanist Party	8,207	0.04	0
Front for Victory	Democratic Space For Victory	2,810	0.01	0
Front for Victory	Total	7,693,502	33.05	47
Progressive, Civic and Social Front	Progressive Front	2,187,627	9.40	9
Progressive, Civic and Social Front	Radical Civic Union	1,379,178	5.92	8
Progressive, Civic and Social Front	Broad Front UNEN	589,545	2.53	5
Progressive, Civic and Social Front	Civic and Social Front	457,555	1.97	5
Progressive, Civic and Social Front	Encuentro por Corrientes	263,713	1.13	2
Progressive, Civic and Social Front	Union for Chaco	214,824	0.92	1
Progressive, Civic and Social Front	Jujuy Front	129,016	0.55	2
Progressive, Civic and Social Front	Formosan Broad Front	104,649	0.45	1
Progressive, Civic and Social Front	La Rioja Civic Force	87,245	0.37	1
Progressive, Civic and Social Front	Civic Coalition ARI	69,403	0.30	0
Progressive, Civic and Social Front	Union to Live Better	67,043	0.29	2
Progressive, Civic and Social Front	Neuquén Civic Commitment	38,483	0.17	0
Progressive, Civic and Social Front	Socialist Party	25,749	0.11	0
Progressive, Civic and Social Front	Broad Progressive Front–Civic Coalition ARI	20,607	0.09	0
Progressive, Civic and Social Front	Generation for a National Encounter	1,750	0.01	0
Progressive, Civic and Social Front	Total	5,636,387	24.21	36
Renewal Front	Renewal Front	3,943,056	16.94	16
Renewal Front	Popular Change	56,769	0.24	0
Renewal Front	Third Position Front	36,997	0.16	0
Renewal Front	Santafesino 100%	34,910	0.15	0
Renewal Front	Popular Union	15,402	0.07	0
Renewal Front	Total	4,087,134	17.56	16
Federal Peronism	Union for Córdoba	532,702	2.29	3
Federal Peronism	United for Freedom and Labour (PF–UcyB–MID–CET)	486,753	2.09	2
Federal Peronism	Federal Commitment	259,195	1.11	3
Federal Peronism	Chubut Action Party	153,395	0.66	2
Federal Peronism	Union with Faith	140,971	0.61	0
Federal Peronism	Salta Popular Front	132,242	0.57	1
Federal Peronism	Justicialist Party	105,412	0.45	1
Federal Peronism	United Front	88,274	0.38	0
Federal Peronism	Jujuy First Front	17,156	0.07	0
Federal Peronism	Faith Party	8,198	0.04	0
Federal Peronism	New Federal Pact	5,586	0.02	0
Federal Peronism	Total	1,929,884	8.29	12
PRO Union	PRO Union	1,450,848	6.23	9
PRO Union	Union for Entre Ríos	181,700	0.78	1
PRO Union	Democratic Party–Republican Proposal	52,578	0.23	0
PRO Union	Federal Proposal	38,981	0.17	1
PRO Union	Republican Proposal	23,840	0.10	0
PRO Union	Federal Union	7,694	0.03	0
PRO Union	Total	1,755,641	7.54	11
Workers' Left Front	Workers' Left Front	977,149	4.20	2
Workers' Left Front	Workers' Party	205,701	0.88	1
Workers' Left Front	Socialist Left	23,369	0.10	0
Workers' Left Front	Socialist Workers' Party	5,033	0.02	0
Workers' Left Front	Total	1,211,252	5.20	3
Neuquén People's Movement		133,952	0.58	2
Workers' Socialist Movement	New Left	67,451	0.29	0
Workers' Socialist Movement	Popular Alternative	27,481	0.12	0
Workers' Socialist Movement	Workers' Socialist Movement	24,629	0.11	0
Workers' Socialist Movement	People's Front	5,337	0.02	0
Workers' Socialist Movement	Total	124,898	0.54	0
We are all Salta		113,404	0.49	0
Independent Neighborhoodism		91,870	0.39	0
Republican Force		72,782	0.31	0
Self-determination and Freedom		69,447	0.30	0
Renewal Crusade		42,852	0.18	0
Encuentro Vecinal Córdoba		42,812	0.18	0
Popular Way		41,704	0.18	0
Salta Renewal Party		37,649	0.16	0
Unite! With Faith for Culture, Education and Work		27,990	0.12	0
Independent Movement of Justice and Dignity		23,470	0.10	0
Freemen of the South Movement		18,477	0.08	0
Plural Front		17,158	0.07	0
Citizen Dignity		15,292	0.07	0
Social Pole		13,248	0.06	0
Fuegian People's Movement		12,796	0.05	0
Independence Labor Party		12,670	0.05	0
Union of the Neuquinos		12,066	0.05	0
Independent Democratic Party		10,707	0.05	0
Memory and Social Mobilization		9,770	0.04	0
New People		9,178	0.04	0
Popular Party		7,040	0.03	0
Party for a United People		5,204	0.02	0
Total		23,280,236	100.00	127
Valid votes		23,280,236	95.14	
Invalid votes		325,063	1.33	
Blank votes		863,058	3.53	
Total votes		24,468,357	100.00	
Registered voters/turnout		30,673,477	79.77	
Source: DINE

==== Results by province ====
Province	FPV			FPCyS			FR			Federal Peronism			PRO			Others		
Province	Votes	%	Seats	Votes	%	Seats	Votes	%	Seats	Votes	%	Seats	Votes	%	Seats	Votes	%	Seats
Buenos Aires	2,900,494	32.33	12	1,050,608	11.71	4	3,943,056	43.95	16	627,724	7.00	2	—	—	—	449,450	5.01	1
Buenos Aires City	395,664	21.62	3	589,545	32.21	5	—	—	—	—	—	—	630,595	34.46	5	214,317	11.71	—
Catamarca	77,148	38.83	1	79,512	40.02	2	36,997	18.62	—	—	—	—	—	—	—	5,044	2.54	—
Chaco	352,091	59.32	3	214,824	36.19	1	—	—	—	—	—	—	—	—	—	26,644	4.49	—
Chubut	67,688	23.22	—	44,259	15.18	—	—	—	—	153,395	52.63	2	—	—	—	26,140	8.97	—
Córdoba	305,789	15.27	2	591,131	29.51	3	—	—	—	532,702	26.60	3	288,663	14.41	1	284,585	14.21	—
Corrientes	238,850	42.70	1	263,713	47.15	2	56,769	10.15	—	—	—	—	—	—	—	—	—	—
Entre Ríos	362,046	46.65	3	208,889	26.91	1	—	—	—	—	—	—	181,700	23.41	1	23,525	3.03	—
Formosa	180,379	61.54	1	104,649	35.70	1	—	—	—	—	—	—	—	—	—	8,069	2.75	—
Jujuy	127,718	39.41	1	129,016	39.81	2	—	—	—	17,156	5.29	—	15,146	4.67	—	35,008	10.80	—
La Pampa	8,207	4.07	—	69,431	34.43	1	—	—	—	70,844	35.13	1	38,981	19.33	1	14,211	7.05	—
La Rioja	88,014	46.94	1	87,245	46.53	1	—	—	—	8,059	4.30	—	—	—	—	4,192	2.24	—
Mendoza	277,760	27.18	1	507,979	49.70	3	—	—	—	40,331	3.95	—	52,578	5.14	—	143,381	14.03	1
Misiones	327,623	54.42	2	186,083	30.91	1	—	—	—	88,274	14.66	—	—	—	—	—	—	—
Neuquén	70,963	21.31	1	49,279	14.80	—	15,402	4.62	—	—	—	—	—	—	—	197,428	59.27	2
Río Negro	172,457	50.76	2	138,176	40.67	—	—	—	—	—	—	—	—	—	—	29,101	8.57	—
Salta	169,433	26.86	1	—	—	—	—	—	—	132,242	20.96	1	—	—	—	329,238	52.18	1
San Juan	224,585	55.36	2	18,300	4.51	—	—	—	—	92,778	22.87	1	—	—	—	70,044	17.26	—
San Luis	41,045	17.89	—	54,014	23.55	1	—	—	—	123,613	53.89	2	—	—	—	10,707	4.67	—
Santa Cruz	39,277	24.70	1	67,043	42.16	2	—	—	—	31,910	20.07	—	—	—	—	20,793	13.08	—
Santa Fe	430,589	22.67	2	803,485	42.31	4	34,910	1.84	—	—	—	—	516,444	27.20	3	113,560	5.98	—
Santiago del Estero	378,615	81.49	3	65,209	14.03	—	—	—	—	8,198	1.76	—	—	—	—	12,614	2.71	—
Tierra del Fuego	39,338	52.51	2	5,385	7.19	—	—	—	—	2,658	3.55	—	7,694	10.27	—	19,836	26.48	—
Tucumán	417,729	46.94	2	308,612	34.68	2	—	—	—	—	—	—	23,840	2.68	—	139,801	15.71	—
Total	7,693,502	33.05	47	5,636,387	24.21	36	4,087,134	17.56	16	1,929,884	8.29	12	1,755,641	7.54	11	2,177,688	9.35	5

=== Senate ===
Party or alliance		Votes	%	Seats
Party or alliance		Votes	%	Won
Front for Victory	Front for Victory	1,629,559	32.07	11
Front for Victory	Civic Front for Santiago	225,828	4.44	2
Front for Victory	Popular Front	136,481	2.69	1
Front for Victory	Democratic Space For Victory	3,883	0.08	0
Front for Victory	Total	1,995,751	39.28	14
Progressive, Civic and Social Front	Broad Front UNEN	509,446	10.03	1
Progressive, Civic and Social Front	Radical Civic Union	214,148	4.21	0
Progressive, Civic and Social Front	Union for Chaco	211,023	4.15	1
Progressive, Civic and Social Front	Progressive Front	209,029	4.11	1
Progressive, Civic and Social Front	Neuquén Civic Commitment	39,116	0.77	0
Progressive, Civic and Social Front	Total	1,182,762	23.28	3
PRO Union	PRO Union	722,831	14.23	2
PRO Union	Union for Entre Ríos	201,562	3.97	1
PRO Union	Federal Union	9,639	0.19	0
PRO Union	Total	934,032	18.38	3
Workers' Left Front	Workers' Left Front	118,423	2.33	0
Workers' Left Front	Workers' Party	159,669	3.14	0
Workers' Left Front	Socialist Left	12,485	0.25	0
Workers' Left Front	Total	290,577	5.72	0
Federal Peronism	Salta Popular Front	154,619	3.04	1
Federal Peronism	Faith Party	8,049	0.16	0
Federal Peronism	Justicialist Party	2,403	0.05	0
Federal Peronism	Total	165,071	3.25	1
Neuquén People's Movement		141,066	2.78	2
We are all Salta		142,468	2.80	0
Popular Way		47,189	0.93	0
Self-determination and Freedom		47,188	0.93	0
Salta Renewal Party		41,876	0.82	0
Workers' Socialist Movement		22,623	0.45	0
Freemen of the South Movement		17,066	0.34	0
Popular Union		15,929	0.31	0
Fuegian People's Movement		15,639	0.31	1
Union of the Neuquinos		11,318	0.22	0
Popular Party		10,509	0.21	0
Total		5,081,064	100.00	24
Valid votes		5,081,064	93.74	
Invalid votes		75,242	1.39	
Blank votes		263,860	4.87	
Total votes		5,420,166	100.00	
Registered voters/turnout		6,925,729	78.26	
Source: DINE

==== Results by province ====
Province	FPV			FPCyS			PRO			Others		
Province	Votes	%	Seats	Votes	%	Seats	Votes	%	Seats	Votes	%	Seats
Buenos Aires City	428,289	23.26	—	509,446	27.67	1	722,831	39.26	2	180,518	9.80	—
Chaco	366,184	60.62	2	211,023	34.93	1	—	—	—	26,878	4.45	—
Entre Ríos	362,664	46.25	2	197,329	25.16	—	201,562	25.70	1	22,623	2.88	—
Neuquén	69,517	20.66	1	49,347	14.66	—	—	—	—	217,661	64.68	2
Río Negro	172,511	49.92	2	145,825	42.20	1	—	—	—	27,210	7.87	—
Salta	184,747	29.36	2	—	—	—	—	—	—	444,544	70.64	1
Santiago del Estero	383,885	81.60	3	66,031	14.04	—	—	—	—	20,534	4.36	—
Tierra del Fuego	27,954	39.98	2	3,761	5.38	—	9,639	13.79	—	28.551	40.85	1
Total	1,995,751	39.28	14	1,182,762	23.28	3	934,032	18.38	3	968,519	19.06	4
