= Mara Brawer =

Argentine politician

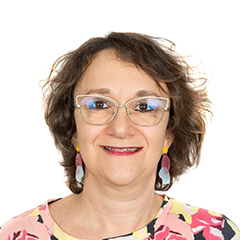

National Deputy
- In office 19 December 2019 – 10 December 2023
- Constituency: City of Buenos Aires
- In office 10 December 2011 – 10 December 2015
- Constituency: City of Buenos Aires

Personal details
- Born: 16 May 1962 (age 64) Buenos Aires, Argentina
- Party: Justicialist Party
- Other political affiliations: Front for Victory (2003–2017); Citizen's Unity (2017–2019); Frente de Todos (2019–present)
- Education: University of Buenos Aires
- Profession: Psychologist

Mara Brawer (born 16 May 1962) is an Argentine psychologist and politician. She served as National Deputy elected in the Federal Capital from 2011 to 2015 and then from 2019 to 2023. A member of the Justicialist Party, Brawer sat in the Front for Victory and Frente de Todos blocs.

Brawer has also served as Undersecretary of Education in the Government of the Buenos Aires City from 2006 to 2007, and as Undersecretary of Equity and Education Quality in the Ministry of Education of Argentina from 2009 to 2011.

== Early life and education ==
Mara Brawer was born on 16 May 1962 in Buenos Aires. She is Jewish. She studied at the University of Buenos Aires Faculty of Psychology and completed a degree on mediation and conflict resolution from Universidad de Belgrano.

== Political career ==
From 2006 to 2007, Brawer was Undersecretary of Education in the city government of Buenos Aires, in the administration of Jorge Telerman. She was later head of the Argentine Observatory on School Violence, dependent on the Ministry of Education of Argentina. In 2009, she was appointed Undersecretary of Equity and Education Quality, also within the scope of the national Ministry of Education, in the administration of Minister Alberto Sileoni.

=== National Deputy ===
At the 2011 general election, Brawer was a candidate in the Front for Victory list to the Argentine Chamber of Deputies in Buenos Aires; she was elected. During her first term, she authored Law 26.892 on coexistence and approach of social conflictivity in educational institutions. She did not run for re-election in 2015.

In 2014, Brawer was appointed secretary of women's affairs of the Buenos Aires City Justicialist Party.

Brawer ran again in the 2019 general election, this time as the 6th candidate in the Frente de Todos list. Though she was not elected, she took office in place of Victoria Donda, who resigned to become head of the National Institute Against Discrimination, Xenophobia and Racism.

== Personal life ==
Brawer is a lesbian.

== Electoral history ==
Electoral history of Mara Brawer
Election	Office	List	#	District	Votes			Result	Ref.
Election	Office	List	#	District	Total	%	P.	Result	Ref.
2011	National Deputy	Front for Victory	5	City of Buenos Aires	548,305	29.16%	1st (Note: Presented on an electoral list. The data shown represents the share of the vote the entire party/alliance received in that constituency.)	Elected	
2019	National Deputy	Frente de Todos	6	City of Buenos Aires	641,054	35.02%	2nd	Not elected (Note: Assumed office on 19 December 2019 following the resignation of Victoria Donda.)	
