= Progresistas =

Progressives Progresistas
- Leader: Margarita Stolbizer
- Founded: 24 June 2015
- Dissolved: 14 June 2017
- Preceded by: Broad Front UNEN
- Ideology: Social democracy Progressivism; Democratic socialism
- Political position: Centre-left
- Members: PS; PSA; MLS; GEN

Website
- progresistas.org.ar

Progresistas (Spanish: Progressives) was a center-left political coalition in Argentina, led by Margarita Stolbizer. It was composed of Generation for a National Encounter, the Freemen of the South Movement, the Socialist Party and the Authentic Socialist Party.

Margarita Stolbizer was candidate for the presidency of Argentina in the 2015 Argentine general election for the Progresistas ticket. She finished fifth with 2.51% of the vote, not enough to pass the threshold for the run-off. In that election, the coalition's list got only one deputy elected to the Chamber of Deputies (Victoria Donda).

In the 2017 legislative election, the coalition's member parties formed different electoral alliances, and in the resulting composition of the National Congress, the Progresistas group was disbanded.

== Members ==
Progresistas was composed of:

Party	Leader	Main ideology	Position
Socialist Party	Antonio Bonfatti	Social Democracy	Centre-left to Left-wing
Authentic Socialist Party	Mario Mazzitelli	Democratic Socialism	Left-wing
Freemen of the South Movement	Humberto Tumini	Left-wing Nationalism	Centre-left to Left-wing
Generation for a National Encounter	Margarita Stolbizer	Social Democracy	Centre-left

== Electoral performance ==
=== President ===
Election year	Candidate	1st round	
Election year	Candidate	# of overall votes	% of overall vote
2015	Margarita Stolbizer	632,551	2.51 (lost)

== Legisladores ==
=== National Deputies ===
Diputado	Partido	Provincia
Alicia Mabel Ciciliani	Socialist Party (Argentina)	Santa Fe
Hermes Binner	Socialist Party (Argentina)	Santa Fe
Lucila Beatriz Dure	Socialist Party (Argentina)	Formosa
Gabriela Troiano	Socialist Party (Argentina)	Buenos Aires
Victoria Donda	Freemen of the South Movement	Buenos Aires
Federico Augusto Masso	Freemen of the South Movement	Tucumán
Graciela Cousinet	Freemen of the South Movement	Mendoza
Margarita Stolbizer	Generation for a National Encounter	Buenos Aires

=== National Senators ===
Senador	Partido	Provincia
Jaime Linares	Generation for a National Encounter	Buenos Aires

== See also ==
- Broad Front UNEN
- Broad Progressive Front
