= Broad Front UNEN =

Former political coalition in Argentina

Broad Front UNEN Frente Amplio UNEN
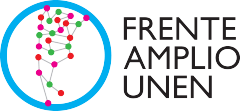
- Abbreviation: FAUNEN
- President: Fernando Solanas
- Founded: June 13, 2013 (as an electoral alliance); April 22, 2014 (recognized as a political coalition)
- Dissolved: March 15, 2015 (after the UCR's National convention)
- Preceded by: Broad Progressive Front
- Succeeded by: Cambiemos (UCR, CC-ARI); Progresistas (PS, PSA, GEN, LDS)
- Headquarters: Buenos Aires, Argentina
- Ideology: Progressivism; Social liberalism Social democracy Third Way; Left-wing nationalism
- Political position: Center to centre-left
- Colours: Light green, Sky blue, Red, & Pink
- Members: Radical Civic Union; Civic Coalition ARI; Project South; Socialist Party; Authentic Socialist Party; Generation for a National Encounter; Freemen of the South; Civic Front of Córdoba

Website
- frenteampliounen.org

Broad Front UNEN (Spanish: Frente Amplio UNEN) was a center-left political coalition in Argentina. It arose through an alliance between Radical Civic Union, Civic Coalition ARI, Proyecto Sur, Freemen of the South Movement, Socialist Party, Authentic Socialist Party, and GEN.

The name UNEN is an acronym of "Unión y Encuentro" (Spanish: Unity and meeting).

Founded in April 2014, the purpose of the coalition was to unite the parties that oppose Peronism and Kirchnerism in a single entity, but the inclusion of the center-right party Republican Proposal was a controversial topic among the parties.

== History ==
The coalition was composed of several parties. The Broad Progressive Front was a socialist coalition that placed second in the 2011 Argentine general election, with the candidate Hermes Binner. UNEN was another coalition created in the 2013 Argentine legislative election, composed by the Radical Civic Union, Proyecto Sur, and the Civic Coalition ARI. With the candidates Pino Solanas and Elisa Carrió running for the Senate and the Chamber of Deputies, respectively, UNEN placed second in the city of Buenos Aires, forcing Daniel Filmus (the candidate of the national government) into third place, thus ousting him from Senate.

The Broad Front UNEN coalition had its inauguration at the Argentine Broadway Theatre. Radical politician Luis Brandoni announced the content of the constitution document, which was then signed by the leaders of the parties.

The coalition includes most Argentine parties that are not Peronist. The likely Peronist candidates for the 2015 presidential election are Daniel Scioli, governor of the Buenos Aires province; Sergio Massa, elected deputy in 2013; and other candidates sponsored by the national government such as Sergio Urribarri and Florencio Randazzo.

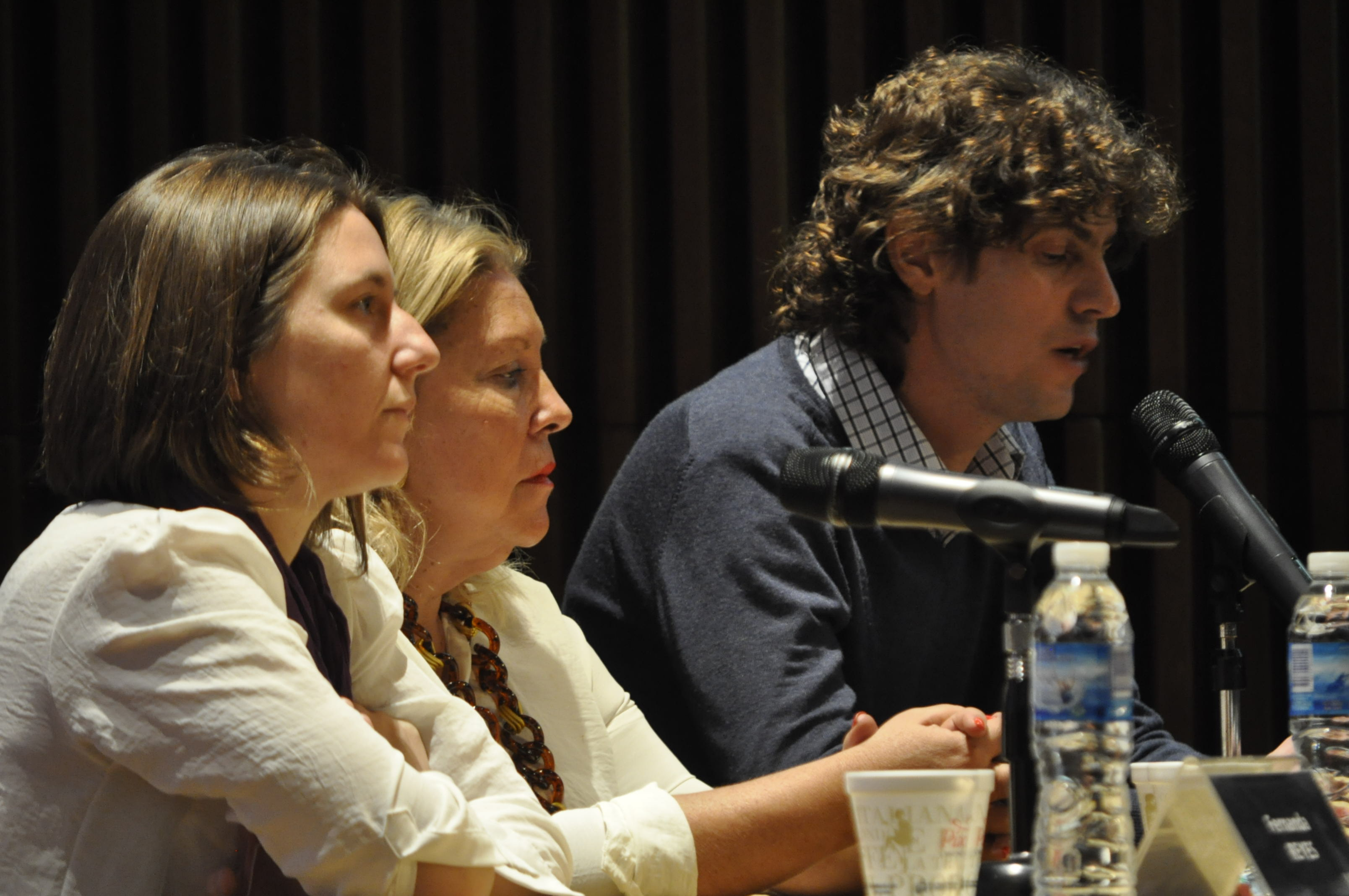
Elisa Carrió, Fernanda Reyes and Martin Lousteau, UNEN's leaders from Civic Coalition ARI

There was some controversy about the inclusion of the Republican Proposal, led by Buenos Aires mayor Mauricio Macri, in the coalition. Macri's support would be needed to counter the powerful Peronist parties, but he is a conservative and most parties in the coalition are left-wing or centre-left. As of April 2014, Solanas, Margarita Stolbizer, and Ricardo Alfonsín rejected to join forces with Macri, whereas Carrió and other radicals did not reject the idea. Macri ruled out an electoral alliance, but proposed instead to find consensus for national policies after the elections.

The inauguration of the provincial wing of UNEN for the Buenos Aires Province, the largest province of Argentina, is scheduled for May 22, one month after the general national inauguration. It will take place at the National University of Avellaneda. The likely candidates for governor of the Buenos Aires province are Facundo Manes, Héctor Gutiérrez, Miguel Bazze, Gerardo Milman, Sergio Buil, Sebastián Cinquerrui and Mario Cafiero. Elisa Carrió has commented that she may run for governor instead of president, but dismissed the idea later. The coalition also intends to make a meeting on May 24 at the house of the 1852 San Nicolás Agreement, but the place is owned by the ministry of culture of the province, currently under the Kirchnerite rule of Scioli. So far, it has not given authorization for the event.

== Policies ==
UNEN opposed the nationalization of the Navy Petty-Officers School of Mechanics, which is under the jurisdiction of the city of Buenos Aires. A press release from UNEN described the handover as "illegal and arbitrary".

They also proposed a reduction to the income tax, which was not updated according to the high inflation, but the Kirchnerite legislators retired from Congress to prevent the minimum quorum.

== Member parties ==
Party	Leader	Ideology	Position
Socialist Party	Hermes Binner	Social democracy, democratic socialism	Centre-left
Authentic Socialist Party	Mario Mazzitelli	Social democracy, democratic socialism	Left-wing
Freemen of the South Movement	Humberto Tumini	Progressivism	Centre-left
Radical Civic Union	Ernesto Sanz	Liberalism	Center; Factions: Centre-left to centre-right
Generation for a National Encounter	Margarita Stolbizer	Social democracy	Centre-left
Proyecto Sur	Fernando Solanas	Progressivism, left-wing nationalism	Centre-left to left-wing

== Former members ==
Party	Leader	Ideology	Position
Civic Front of Córdoba	Luis Juez	Córdoba regionalism	Center
Coalición Cívica ARI	Elisa Carrió	Social liberalism	Center

== 2013 election and nationwide replication ==
In the October 2013 legislative election, alliances of UCR, CC-ARI, PS and other centre-left parties (mainly components of the 2011 Broad Progressive Front) ran in most provinces, usually under the name of the Progressive, Civic and Social Front. In the city of Buenos Aires, an analogous alliance was called UNEN, in Chaco Union for Chaco, in Jujuy Jujuyan Front, in Catamarca Civic and Social Front and in Santa Cruz Front Let's Change for Growth. In Córdoba, Mendoza and Entre Rios, however, the UCR ran separately from the rest of the centre-left opposition.

== 2015 elections ==
Opinion polls made by Poliarquía in April 2014 revealed that UNEN may be fourth in the electoral preferences, behind Massa, Scioli and Macri. The study shows as well that the four parties may be having very close electoral preferences. Eduardo Fidanza, director of Poliarquía, suggested that UNEN may be fourth in the electoral preferences because, unlike the other candidates, the coalition does not have an obvious political leader, and may increase its chances after the primary elections.

The poll asked as well a preferred candidate of UNEN to those who may vote for the coalition. There was a tie between Hermes Binner and Julio Cobos, followed by Elisa Carrió.

== Break up ==
Elisa Carrió was the first to leave the coalition, making instead an alliance with Macri and running in the primary elections against him. Hermes Binner declined his presidential candidacy, to focus on keeping the Santa Fe province for the socialist party. The Radical Civic Union made a congress to decide the candidacies and alliances, and appointed Sanz as the candidate to run against Macri. Cobos accepted the result of the discussion and declined his candidacy.

== Electoral history ==
=== Congressional elections ===
==== Chamber of Deputies ====
Election year	votes	%	seats won	Total seats	Position	Presidency	Note
2013	5,460,861	23.81	34	61 / 257	Minority	Cristina Fernández (FPV—PJ)	

==== Senate elections ====
Election year	votes	%	seats won	Total seats	Position	Presidency	Note
2013	1,356,419	26.37	3	19 / 72	Minority	Cristina Fernández (FPV—PJ)	
