= Generation for a National Encounter =

Political party in Argentina

Generation for a National Encounter Generación para un Encuentro Nacional
- Leader: Margarita Stolbizer
- Secretary General: Sergio Abrevaya
- Founded: 2007; 18 years ago
- Split from: Radical Civic Union
- Youth wing: Juventud GEN
- Membership (2017): ▲35,799
- Ideology: Social liberalism Progressivism; Social democracy
- Political position: Centre to centre-left
- National affiliation: Juntos por el Cambio
- International affiliation: Progressive Alliance
- Colors: Red, grey and black
- Seats in the Chamber of Deputies: 1 / 257
- Seats in the Senate: 0 / 72

Website
- Official website

Generation for a National Encounter (Spanish: Generación para un Encuentro Nacional), sometimes known as the GEN Party (Spanish: Partido GEN) or simply as GEN, is a centre-left political party in Argentina. It was founded in 2007 by Margarita Stolbizer as a split from the Radical Civic Union, in opposition to the UCR's endorsement of Roberto Lavagna's general election.

The party forms part of the Juntos por el Cambio coalition since 2021. In the 2021 legislative election, Stolbizer herself was elected to the Chamber of Deputies, granting the party representation at the federal level for the first time since 2017.

== History ==
The GEN Party was founded in 2007 by Margarita Stolbizer as a split from the Radical Civic Union (UCR), in opposition to the UCR's endorsement of Roberto Lavagna's presidential candidacy. Since its establishment it has been a junior coalition party in a number of electoral alliances: first, in 2007, it supported the Civic Coalition and its 2007 presidential candidate, Elisa Carrió, alongside other non-peronist progressive parties like the Socialist Party and the ARI. In 2011, GEN joined the Broad Progressive Front (FAP) in support of the Socialist Party's Hermes Binner's presidential run. The FAP would later give way to the Broad Front UNEN, of which the GEN was also a part.

In the 2015 general election, Stolbizer herself was nominated to the presidency by the Broad Front UNEN's successor, Progresistas. The bid was unsuccessful and Stolbizer landed fifth with only 2.51% of the popular vote. For the 2017 legislative election, the GEN joined forces with the peronist Renewal Front (FR) to form 1País. Stolbizer and the FR leader Sergio Massa's bid to the Senate was unsuccessful in their home province of Buenos Aires, placing third behind the Cambiemos and Citizen's Unity lists. Following the expiration of Stolbizer's term in the Chamber of Deputies and Jaime Linares's term in the Senate in 2017, the party lost all its representation at the federal level.

In 2019, the GEN Party broke its alliance with the Renewal Front, which joined the Frente de Todos, and instead formed the Federal Consensus coalition alongside other small parties to support the presidential candidacy of Roberto Lavagna. Lavagna placed third in the contest with a little over 6% of the vote.

Ahead of the 2021 legislative election, the party left Federal Consensus and backed Juntos por el Cambio; Stolbizer herself endorsed the UCR's Facundo Manes in the JxC primary elections.

== Electoral performance ==
=== President ===
Election year	Candidate	Coalition	1st round	
Election year	Candidate	Coalition	# of overall votes	% of overall vote
2007	Elisa Carrió	Civic Coalition	4,401,981 (2nd)	23.04 (lost)
2011	Hermes Binner	FAP	3,684,970 (2nd)	16.81 (lost)
2015	Margarita Stolbizer	Progresistas	632,551 (5th)	2.51 (lost)
2019	Roberto Lavagna	Federal Consensus	1,649,315 (3rd)	6.14 (lost)

=== Chamber of Deputies ===
Election year	Votes	%	seats won	total seats	position	presidency	notes
2007	3,391,742	18.80 (#2nd)	2	2 / 257	Minority	Cristina Fernández de Kirchner (PJ—FPV)	within the CC
2009	5,705,105	29.53 (#1st)	1	3 / 257	Minority	Cristina Fernández de Kirchner (PJ—FPV)	within the ACyS
2011	2,780,984	13.52 (#2nd)	2	3 / 257	Minority	Cristina Fernández de Kirchner (PJ—FPV)	within the FAP
2013	5,510,949	24.37 (#2nd)	1	3 / 257	Minority	Cristina Fernández de Kirchner (PJ—FPV)	within the FPCyS
2015	803,610	3.45 (#5th)	0	1 / 257	Minority	Mauricio Macri (PRO—Cambiemos)	within Progresistas
2017	1,467,558	5.71 (#4th)	0	0 / 257	Minority	Mauricio Macri (PRO—Cambiemos)	within 1País
2019	1,477,802	5.85 (#3rd)	0	0 / 257	Minority	Alberto Fernández (PJ—FDT)	within CF

=== Senate ===
Election year	Votes	%	seats won	total seats	position	presidency	notes
2007	697,071	14,91 (#2nd)	0	0 / 72	Extra-parliamentary	Cristina Fernández de Kirchner (PJ—FPV)	within the CC
2009	1,866,500	29,61 (#1st)	0	0 / 72	Extra-parliamentary	Cristina Fernández de Kirchner (PJ—FPV)	within the ACyS
2011	1,103,922	9.94 (#3rd)	1	1 / 72	Minority	Cristina Fernández de Kirchner (PJ—FPV)	within the FAP
2013	209,030	1.07 (#2nd)	0	1 / 72	Minority	Cristina Fernández de Kirchner (PJ—FPV)	within the FPCyS
2015	316,285	5.41 (#5th)	0	1 / 72	Extra-parliamentary	Mauricio Macri (PRO—Cambiemos)	within Progresistas
2017	1,154,657	9.73 (#3rd)	0	0 / 72	Extra-parliamentary	Mauricio Macri (PRO—Cambiemos)	within 1País
2019	327,962	5.82 (#3rd)	0	0 / 72	Extra-parliamentary	Alberto Fernández (PJ—FDT)	within CF
