= Somos (Argentina) =

Argentine political party

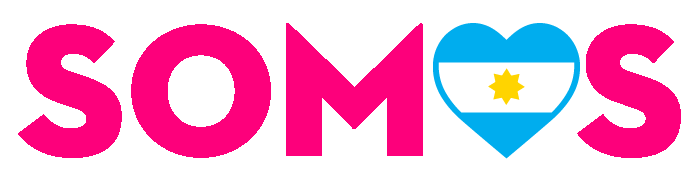
- Founder: Victoria Donda
- Founded: 31 October 2018
- Split from: Freemen of the South Movement
- Headquarters: Buenos Aires
- Ideology: Democratic socialism Feminism
- Political position: Left-wing
- National affiliation: Homeland Force
- International affiliation: São Paulo Forum
- Colours: Pink
- Seats in the Chamber of Deputies: 0 / 257

Website
- somos.org.ar

Somos (English: We Are) is a democratic socialist and feminist political party in Argentina. It was founded by Victoria Donda in October 2018.

It is a member of the Unión por la Patria coalition, formerly Frente de Todos, which supported former president Alberto Fernández, as well as Sergio Massa's unsuccessful presidential campaign to succeed Fernández.
