= Margarita Stolbizer =

Argentine lawyer and politician

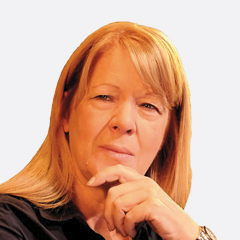

National Deputy
- Incumbent
- Assumed office 10 December 2021
- Constituency: Buenos Aires
- In office 10 December 2009 – 10 December 2017
- Constituency: Buenos Aires
- In office 10 December 1997 – 10 December 2005
- Constituency: Buenos Aires

Personal details
- Born: 17 March 1955 (age 71) Morón, Argentina
- Party: Radical Civic Union (1983–2007); Generation for a National Encounter (since 2007)
- Other political affiliations: Broad Progressive Front (2011–2013); Broad Front UNEN (2013–2015); Progresistas (2015–2017); 1País (2017–2019); Federal Consensus (2019–2021); Juntos por el Cambio (2021–present)
- Profession: Lawyer

Margarita Stolbizer (born 17 March 1955) is an Argentine lawyer and politician. Originally a member of the Radical Civic Union (UCR), she founded her own party, Generation for a National Encounter (GEN) in 2007. She has been a member of the Chamber of Deputies of Argentina on three occasions: from 1997 to 2005, from 2009 to 2017, and since 2021.

She was a presidential candidate in the 2015 general election, where she received 3.47% of the vote.

== Early life and education ==
Margarita Stolbizer was born in the western Buenos Aires suburb of Morón, in 1955. She enrolled at the Universidad de Morón and graduated in 1978, after which she taught at her alma mater's law school for four years. An avid volleyball player, she created her city's first women's volleyball team.

== Political career ==
Stolbizer was named to the National Council of Lawyers' Associations and, following elections in 1983, she was appointed Social Policy Director for the city of Morón.

She had been affiliated with the centrist Radical Civic Union (UCR) − whose candidate, Raúl Alfonsín had been elected president in 1983 − since her days at the university and in 1985, she was elected to the Morón City Council on the UCR ticket. As such she gained prominence for her role in the investigation and impeachment of opposition Justicialist Party Mayor Juan Carlos Rousselot, in 1989. She was later named staff counsel to the Infrastructure Contracts Investigations Committee of the Legislature of the Province of Buenos Aires (Argentina's largest), and took part in ILO conferences on the subjects of labor rights and corruption, as well as the Human Rights Commission of the Latin American Parliament.

She supported Alfonsín's initiative to create an alliance with the center-left Frepaso and was elected to the Argentine Chamber of Deputies, in 1997. She was named to numerous committees dealing with legal and constitutional rights, and was eventually named President of the Penal Legislation Committee. Close to both Alfonsín and Congressman Federico Storani, her influence grew after Fernando de la Rúa 1999 election to the presidency and Storani's appointment as Interior Minister. She was strongly opposed, however, to the President's crisis decision to return Domingo Cavallo to the Economy Ministry, in March 2001. Cavallo had been first appointed to the post in 1991 by de la Rúa's predecessor and nemesis, Carlos Menem, and was considered responsible by Stolbizer for the prevailing economic crisis.

Stolbizer represented the Argentine Congress in the 2002 conference of Parliamentarians for Global Action in Stockholm, and was named Vice President of their International Council. She was nominated by the UCR as a candidate for the office of Governor of Buenos Aires Province for the 2003 elections, though fallout from President de la Rúa's chaotic, December 2001 resignation helped relegate her to fourth place (garnering 9% of the vote).

She developed increasing differences with the UCR's leadership and in 2005, unsuccessfully challenged former President Alfonsín for the post of head of the Buenos Aires Province delegation to the UCR Central Committee. The party's weakness ahead of the 2007 presidential election prompted the UCR to endorse a stronger candidate akin to their views, which combine social democratic policies with a longtime anti-Peronism. Stolbizer, by then a leader in the UCR's congressional delegation, favored endorsing ARI candidate Elisa Carrió (whose 2001 defection from the UCR had distanced the former colleagues), though Alfonsín's preference for the center-left economist Roberto Lavagna prevailed.

The dissension led to her break with the UCR, whereby she formed the Generation for a National Encounter (GEN), by which she ran again for Governor of Buenos Aires Province during the same 2007 elections. She fared better, with 17% of the vote, while still placing third (Lavagna, for his part, also garnered third place). Stolbizer continued her policy for fostering alliances with former rivals: in 2007, she led her GEN party into Carrió's Civic Coalition, which grew into the largest opposition to Néstor and Cristina Kirchner's ruling Front for Victory; she also secured an alliance with Ricardo Alfonsín, a leading UCR figure and son of the late former president, ahead of the 2009 legislative elections.

== Personal life ==
Her son, Nicolás Laprovíttola, is a professional basketball player for FC Barcelona of the Liga ACB and the EuroLeague and for the Argentine national basketball team.

== Electoral history ==
=== Executive ===
Electoral history of Margarita Stolbizer
Election	Office	List	Votes			Result	Ref.
Election	Office	List	Total	%	P.	Result	Ref.
2007	Governor of Buenos Aires	Civic Coalition	1,158,672	16.55%	2nd	Not elected	
2011	Governor of Buenos Aires	Broad Progressive Front	904,912	11.64%	3rd	Not elected	
2015	President of Argentina	Progresistas	632,551	2.51%	5th	Not elected	

=== Legislative ===
Electoral history of Margarita Stolbizer
Election	Office	List	#	District	Votes			Result	Ref.
Election	Office	List	#	District	Total	%	P.	Result	Ref.
1985	City Councillor	Radical Civic Union	3	Morón Partido	113,513	37.77%	1st (Note: Presented on an electoral list. The data shown represents the share of the vote the entire party/alliance received in that constituency.)	Elected	
1997	National Deputy	Alliance	13	Buenos Aires Province	3,315,703	48.28%	1st	Elected	
2001	National Deputy	Alliance	3	Buenos Aires Province	814,551	15.35%	2nd	Elected	
2009	National Deputy	Social and Civic Agreement	1	Buenos Aires Province	1,613,037	21.46%	3rd	Elected	
2013	National Deputy	Progressive, Civic and Social Front	1	Buenos Aires Province	1,050,608	11.71%	3rd	Elected	
2017	National Senator	1País	2	Buenos Aires Province	1,069,747	11.31%	3rd	Not elected	
2021	National Deputy	Together	12	Buenos Aires Province	3,550,321	39.77%	1st	Elected	
