= Progressive, Civic and Social Front =

Political coalition in Argentina

Progressive, Civic and Social Front Frente Progresista, Cívico y Social
- Abbreviation: FPCyS
- Leader: Antonio Bonfatti
- Founded: 2006
- Dissolved: 2023
- Merger of: PS; GEN; PDP; MLS; PI; SI
- Ideology: Progressivism; Social democracy Democratic socialism
- Political position: Centre-left
- Seats in the Chamber of Deputies: 2 / 257
- Seats in the Senate: 0 / 72
- Chamber of Deputies of Santa Fe: 28 / 50
- Senate of Santa Fe: 7 / 19

The Progressive, Civic and Social Front (Spanish: Frente Progresista Cívico y Social, FPCyS) was a center-left political coalition in Santa Fe Province, Argentina.

== History ==
It was first formed in Santa Fe Province in 2006, but was adapted in other provinces for the 2013 legislative elections, as well. In Santa Fe, it is made up of the Socialist Party, the GEN Party, the Radical Civic Union, the Civic Coalition ARI, Freemen of the South, the Democratic Progressive Party, Popular Unity, local factions of the Communist Party and some dissident Peronists. In other provinces, the composition differs slightly. In the city of Buenos Aires, a similar alliance ran under the name, UNEN.

== Provincial alliance in Santa Fe ==
At the legislative elections of 23 October 2005, the front won five of the 127 elected deputies (out of a total of 257). At the Santa Fe elections of 2 September 2007, FPCyS obtained its first major victory as socialist Hermes Binner was elected Governor of Santa Fe Province. At the national legislative elections of 28 June 2009, the FPCyS in Santa Fe won the deputies election by a 0.01% (39.85% - 39.84%) difference with the second front and were defeated in the senators election by a 1.67% (40.59% - 42.26%) difference.

With the governor Hermes Binner as a presidential candidate for the 2011 general election, primaries were made for electing his successor. The FPCyS candidate, then Minister of Government of the Santa Fe Province, Antonio Bonfatti, was elected governor.

== 2013 election and nationwide replication ==
In the October 2013 legislative election, alliances of UCR, CC-ARI, PS and other centre-left parties (mainly components of the 2011 Broad Progressive Front) ran in most provinces, usually under the name of the Progressive, Civic and Social Front. In the city of Buenos Aires, an analogous alliance was called UNEN, in Chaco Union for Chaco, in Jujuy Jujuyan Front, in Catamarca Civic and Social Front and in Santa Cruz Front Let's Change for Growth. In Córdoba, Mendoza and Entre Rios, however, the UCR ran separately from the rest of the centre-left opposition.

== See also ==
- Radical Civic Union
- Broad Progressive Front
- Broad Front UNEN
