= Miguel Ángel Bazze =

Argentine politician

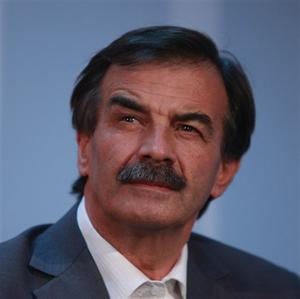

National Deputy
- In office 10 December 2011 – 10 December 2023
- Constituency: Buenos Aires

Provincial Deputy of Buenos Aires
- In office 10 December 1989 – 10 December 1993
- Constituency: Capital Electoral Section

Personal details
- Born: 30 April 1955 (age 70) General Roca, Argentina
- Party: Radical Civic Union
- Other political affiliations: Broad Front UNEN (2013–2015); Juntos por el Cambio (2015–present)

Miguel Ángel Bazze (born 30 April 1955) is an Argentine politician, who served as National Deputy representing Buenos Aires Province from 2011 to 2023. A member of the Radical Civic Union, Bazze sat in the Juntos por el Cambio inter-bloc in the Chamber of Deputies.

Bazze previously served as a member of the Buenos Aires Province Chamber of Deputies, as a city councillor in La Plata, and as president of the Buenos Aires Province Committee of the Radical Civic Union.

== Early life and career ==
Bazze was born on 30 April 1955 in General Roca, in Río Negro Province. When he was 17 years old, he moved to La Plata to study engineering at the National University of La Plata, and it was there he began his political activism in the student wing of the Radical Civic Union, Franja Morada. He would later drop out of university to dedicate himself to politics full time.

Bazze is married and has five sons.

== Political career ==
From 1985 to 1989, Bazze was a member of the La Plata City Council. Then, from 1989 to 1993, he was a member of the Buenos Aires Province Chamber of Deputies elected in the Capital Electoral Section (corresponding to the La Plata Partido). In 2010, he was elected president of the Provincial Committee of the Radical Civic Union, a position he held until 2012 when he was succeeded by Alejandro Armendáriz.

In 2011, Bazze ran for a seat in the Argentine Chamber of Deputies as the first candidate in the Union for Social Development (UDESO) list; the list received 11.54% of the vote and Bazze was elected. He was re-elected in 2015 and in 2019, both times as the third candidate in the Cambiemos and Juntos por el Cambio lists.

== Electoral history ==
Electoral history of Miguel Ángel Bazze
Election	Office	List	#	District	Votes			Result	Ref.
Election	Office	List	#	District	Total	%	P.	Result	Ref.
1985	Councillor	Radical Civic Union	1	La Plata Partido	125,123	45.31%	1st (Note: Presented on an electoral list. The data shown represents the share of the vote the entire party/alliance received in that constituency.)	Elected	
1989	Provincial Deputy	Radical Civic Union	2	Capital Electoral Section	107,554	35.57%	2nd	Elected	
2011	National Deputy	Union for Social Development	1	Buenos Aires Province	928,027	11.54%	3rd	Elected	
2015	National Deputy	Cambiemos	3	Buenos Aires Province	3,037,552	33.75%	2nd	Elected	
2019	National Deputy	Juntos por el Cambio	3	Buenos Aires Province	3,668,580	37.77%	2nd	Elected	
