= Broad Progressive Front (Argentina) =

Former political coalition in Argentina

Broad Progressive Front Frente Amplio Progresista
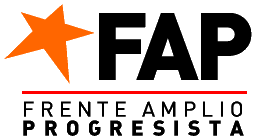
- Abbreviation: FAP
- Leader: Hermes Binner
- Founded: 28 June 2011
- Dissolved: 13 June 2013
- Succeeded by: Broad Front UNEN
- Headquarters: Santa Fe Province
- Ideology: Progressivism; Social democracy Democratic socialism Factions: Parliamentarism; Socialism of the 21st century Left-wing nationalism
- Political position: Centre-left
- International affiliation: Progressive Alliance
- Regional affiliation: COPPPAL; Foro de São Paulo
- Colours: Orange; Blue

The Broad Progressive Front (Spanish: Frente Amplio Progresista, FAP) was a centre-left coalition in Argentina, created in 2011, integrated of progressive and social democratic political parties focusing on an advanced and transparent welfare state. In 2013, it was replaced by UNEN, which in turn was replaced by the Progresistas in 2015.

== History ==
=== Creation ===
The FAP emerged on Saturday June 11, 2011, after the V Extraordinary National Congress of the Socialist Party. Until that moment, the PS had not yet defined its policy of alliances at the national level, having tried to achieve a Progressive Front that would integrate the center-left forces at the national level since the end of 2009.

The tension in which the PS found itself had two fronts: on the one hand, its relationship with the UCR, with which it formed the Progressive, Civic and Social Front in Santa Fe (a coalition that had led Binner to govern the province). and on the other hand, different center-left forces headed by the South Project Movement, which wanted to move away from the Argentine bipartisanship towards a third alternative position. This tension increases with the running of 2011, as both sides pressured the PS for a definition.

=== 2011 general elections ===
The primary elections of August 14, 2011 were the electoral debut of the Frente Amplio Progresista with the presidential candidacy of Hermes Binner. Just a few weeks after its founding, this Front reached 2,125,000 votes throughout the country, that is, around 10.30% of the votes, ranking fourth and only 1.9% behind second.

However, the high positive image of Hermes Binner - and the progressive increase in his knowledge - are indicators that his electorate can continue to grow, consolidating itself as the main force of the opposition.

In the presidential elections, on October 23, he obtained second place with about 17% of the votes, surpassing the radical Ricardo Alfonsín who obtained 11%, totaling 3,700,000 votes throughout the country, thus becoming the main force opponent of the Front for Victory.

=== Dissolution ===
The front ceased to exist in 2013, when some of its members, together with the Radical Civic Union and the Civic Coalition ARI, formed the Broad Front UNEN. After the failure of this project, the parties that had formed the FAP regrouped under the Progresistas coalition.

== Members ==
The Broad Progressive Front was composed of:

Party	Leader	Ideology	Position
Socialist Party	Rubén Giustiniani	Social democracy, Democratic socialism	Centre-left
Authentic Socialist Party	Mario Mazzitelli	Social democracy, Democratic socialism	Left-wing
Freemen of the South Movement	Humberto Tumini	Progressivism	Centre-left
Generation for a National Encounter	Margarita Stolbizer	Social democracy	Centre-left
Popular Unity	Víctor De Gennaro	Left-wing nationalism, Socialism of the 21st century	Left-wing
New Party against Corruption, for Honesty and Transparence	Luis Juez	Córdoba regionalism	Centre-left

== Proposals ==
Some of the main proposals of the Broad Progressive Front are:

- Parliamentary system.
- Gender identity law.
- Assisted reproduction law.
- Same-sex marriage law.
- End of gay blood donation ban.
- Gender equality and eradication of femicide.
- Drug liberalization.
- Sex education.
- Universal and free reproductive health access.
- Complete nationalization of YPF.
- Special policies for the reduction of maternal death.
- Recognition of the Argentine Workers' Central Union (CTA).
- Institutional development of the Union of South American Nations.
- Participatory budgeting.
- Analysis of the external debt.
- Revision of subsidies.

== See also ==
- Progressive, Civic and Social Front
- Hermes Binner
- Margarita Stolbizer
- Roy Cortina
- Victoria Donda
- Luis Juez
- Norma Morandini
- Rubén Giustiniani
