= Victoria Donda =

Argentine politician (born 1977)

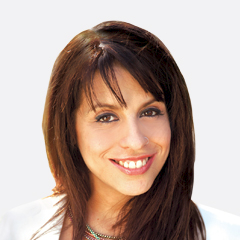

Director of the National Institute Against Discrimination, Xenophobia and Racism
- In office 10 December 2019 – 29 December 2022
- President: Alberto Fernández
- Preceded by: Claudio Presman

National Deputy
- In office 10 December 2007 – 10 December 2019
- Constituency: Buenos Aires (2007–2015); City of Buenos Aires (2015–2019)

Personal details
- Born: Victoria Analia Donda Pérez; 1977 (age 48–49) Clandestine detention center, Buenos Aires, Argentina
- Party: Freemen of the South (2005–2018); Somos (since 2018)
- Other political affiliations: Front for Victory (2005–2008); FAP (2011–2013); Progresistas (2015–2017); Frente de Todos (since 2019)

Victoria Analía Donda Pérez (born 1977) is an Argentine human rights activist and legislator. She is the first daughter of a "disappeared" person, born in captivity, to become a member of the Argentine National Congress. She was the youngest woman to hold that office.

From 2019 to 2022, she was the agency executive of the National Institute Against Discrimination, Xenophobia and Racism (INADI), one of the Argentine government's prime human rights institutions.

== Early life ==
She was born in 1977, in the clandestine detention center in Buenos Aires while her mother, María Hilda Pérez "disappeared" for her involvement with leftist groups. Her father, José María Laureano Donda, was also held in captivity during the same time. Both remain disappeared and are presumed to have been killed during that period. She is one of approximately 500 children known to have been born to disappeared political prisoners during Argentina's Dirty War (1976–1983), who were kidnapped and registered under false identities.

As a baby, Victoria was handed over to another family, who raised her but never told her about her biological parents. Her case is particularly unusual because her paternal uncle, Adolfo Miguel Donda Tigel (her father's brother), was a naval officer who was one of the primary individuals responsible for ESMA (Escuela Superior de Mecánica de la Armada, or the Navy Superior School of Mechanics), which served as the country's largest clandestine centre for the illegal detention, torture, forced disappearance, and murder of thousands of political dissidents such as her parents.

== Recovery of her identity ==
In 2003, when she was 26 years of age, Victoria Donda discovered her true identity after communicating with the group H.I.J.O.S. (Sons and Daughters for Identity and Justice Against Oblivion and Silence) and the Grandmothers of the Plaza de Mayo.

Despite that, even knowing that her real mother was one of the ESMA disappeared, and she was reluctant to have her DNA tested in order to find out who her biological parents were.

On May 24, 2004, when ESMA was converted by the government into a memorial center, Donda spoke at the ceremony:

I realized that I knew I was born there, but also that I was not sure who my mother was. It was moving but at the same time, sad. I thought: 'This woman had been so courageous to get pregnant, to continue fighting for the same society I'm fighting for now, to withstand torture so I could be born and I'm such a chicken who can't even go and give a small blood sample'. I felt I was not worthy of my parents.

—

One week later, DNA analysis revealed Donda's true identity. She was the first "sister" found by H.I.J.O.S. and the 78th granddaughter found by the Grandmothers of the Plaza de Mayo. Some weeks later, her kidnapper was detained; he is currently on trial, alongside Juan Antonio Azic and others, for 62 crimes against humanity.

== Political career ==
Before Victoria Donda knew her identity, she had already been interested in human rights and poverty issues, working for a soup kitchen called "Azucena Villaflor", name of a disappeared human rights activist and first president of Mothers of the Plaza de Mayo. Donda became later member of the Freemen of the South Movement (Movimiento Libres del Sur, LDS). She was part of a mob that stormed into the Argentine Congress and vandalized it during the December 2001 riots.

In 2006, Donda was elected a councilmember in the municipality of Avellaneda, Buenos Aires Province.

In 2007, she was elected to Argentina's Chamber of Deputies on the Front for Victory list, representing Buenos Aires Province. The following year, she joined the Broad Progressive Front (FAP)'s bloc, and was re-elected in that list in 2011. In 2015, she was the first candidate in the Progressives' list and was the only legislator on the list to be elected to Congress, this time representing the Federal Capital.

In 2019 she was selected to head the National Institute Against Discrimination, Xenophobia and Racism (INADI) by President Alberto Fernández. She resigned from the position in December 2022, shortly before the end of her term, and was temporarily replaced by Undersecretary of Diversity Policies Greta Pena.

== Film ==
The documentary film Familia de sangre, directed by Gustavo Bobbio and Daniel Ortiz, tells the story of Victoria Donda.
