= Hermes Binner =

Argentine physician and politician

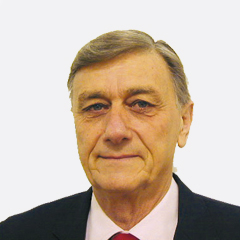

Governor of Santa Fe
- In office December 10, 2007 – December 10, 2011
- Vice Governor: Griselda Tessio
- Preceded by: Jorge Obeid
- Succeeded by: Antonio Bonfatti

Mayor of Rosario
- In office December 10, 1995 – December 10, 2003
- Preceded by: Héctor Cavallero
- Succeeded by: Miguel Lifschitz

Personal details
- Born: Hermes Juan Binner; June 5, 1943 Rafaela, Santa Fe Province, Argentina
- Died: June 26, 2020 (aged 77) Casilda, Santa Fe Province, Argentina
- Party: Socialist Party
- Education: National University of Rosario
- Profession: Physician
- Website: Official website

Hermes Juan Binner (June 5, 1943 − June 26, 2020) was an Argentine physician and politician who served as Governor of Santa Fe from 2007 to 2011. Binner was the first Socialist to serve as governor of an Argentine province, and the first non-Peronist to rule Santa Fe since the last transition to democracy in 1983.

Binner was previously a member of parliament of the Civic and Social Progressive Front, a Santa Fe party coalition including the Socialist Party, the Radical Civic Union and other left-wing parties, since the parliamentary elections of October 23, 2005.

== Biography ==
=== Education and background ===
Binner was born and raised in Rafaela, Santa Fe Province, to a Swiss Argentine family. He attended primary school at St. Joseph's College, and then attended high school at the Rafaela National College, where he began his political activity through participation in the Student Center. At the time (1958) the need for public free non-religious education was being hotly debated in Argentina.

Binner moved to Rosario to study Medicine at the Universidad Nacional de Rosario. At 18 he became affiliated with the Argentine Socialist Party and continued to exercise an intense political activity, both as a member of the Student Center and at the institutional level in the Faculty of Medicine. After the 1966 coup d'état, he participated in the movements resisting the military dictatorship of General Juan Carlos Onganía, against a background of political and ideological persecution.

He graduated in 1970 and continued his militant activism as a Graduate Council Member at the University, as well as working as a union member at the Rosario Medical Association and the Physicians' College.

=== Political trajectory ===
Guillermo Estévez Boero and Binner co-founded the Popular Socialist Party (Partido Socialist Popular, PSP) in Buenos Aires on April 23, 1972, a merger of the Argentine Socialist Party (PSA) with other left-wing groups.

He continued exercising his profession, taking up specialties in anesthesiology and occupational medicine, and starting studies in the field of public health. On the last account he obtained the posts of Sub-Director and Director of public hospitals.

Following the 1989 economic crisis that led to the early handover of power by President Raúl Alfonsín to President-elect Carlos Menem, the UCR Mayor of Rosario Horacio Usandizaga resigned in protest, forcing anticipated municipal elections to be held. The Socialist Héctor Cavallero was elected, and he appointed Binner to the office of Public Health Secretary.

After Cavallero's term, in 1993, Binner was elected concejal (member of the City Council) for the PSP. From this platform he developed a trajectory that led him to present himself as a candidate for the municipal elections of 1995.

== Mayor of Rosario ==
Binner was elected Mayor of Rosario in 1995 and then re-elected in 1999, ending his second four-year term in 2003. He was candidate to the governorship of the province of Santa Fe, obtaining a larger percentage of the popular vote than any of the other candidates, but the controversial voting system in place at the time (Ley de Lemas) caused the Socialist Party to lose the election to the Peronist Party.

The eight years of the Binner administration in Rosario were marked by several guidelines:

- Decentralization and emphasis on the citizen's rule: The city was divided into several large districts, moving the bureaucratic structure from the Municipality to the peripheral barrios (neighbourhoods), and implementing mechanisms of direct democracy.
- Emphasis on the public sphere (health, education, cultural activities) and public welfare. The administration's Health Plan was acknowledged by the Pan-American Health Organization as a model for the rest of Latin America.
- Positioning of Rosario as a strategically placed metropolis with a vast area of economic and geopolitical influence. Binner was a Founding Member and Executive Secretary of Mercociudades (cities of the Mercosur), President of the Ibero-American Center for Urban Strategic Development (CIDEU), and President of the Argentine Municipalities Federation.

On December 8, 2003, months after the end of Binner's second term, the United Nations acknowledged the people and the government of Rosario as a model of democratic governance among 257 Latin American cities.

Hermes Binner was succeeded in office by one of his former municipal officials, Miguel Lifschitz, who continued and developed the policies outlined above, and was re-elected in 2007.

=== Other activities ===
Binner was a member of the National Table of the Socialist Party and the Secretary General of the Santa Fe Federation for the same. He was also the director of the Rosario's Municipal and Provincial Studies Center, an institution for political and academic formation with professionals of diverse disciplines debating current issues and policies.

== National Deputy ==
Binner was a candidate for a seat in the National Chamber of Deputies (the Lower House of the Argentine Congress) for the Progressive, Civic and Social Front, a Santa Fe political coalition (which includes the Socialist Party (PS), members of the Radical Civic Union (UCR), Support for an Egalitarian Republic (ARI), Democratic Progressive Party, Communist Party and Peronist dissident) in the parliamentary elections of October 23, 2005. He won the seat, together with another six candidates of the Progressive Front, by a 10% margin over the list of candidates led by his closest competitor, the Justicialist Party candidate Agustín Rossi.

== Governor of Santa Fe ==
Binner ran for governor of Santa Fe in 2007, with former Santa Fe City federal prosecutor Griselda Tessio as vice-governor, against former chancellor and national deputy for Buenos Aires City Rafael Bielsa, who was chosen in the primaries by the Justicialist Front for Victory. He was supported by the left-wing opposition leader Elisa Carrió, head of the ARI.

Binner won the provincial election of September 2, 2007 by a significant margin (48% to 38%) over Bielsa. He was sworn in on December 11, becoming the first Socialist governor in the history of Argentina, and the first non-Peronist to rule Santa Fe since 1983.

Despite his opposition to the Peronist candidate, who was strongly supported by then-President Néstor Kirchner, Governor Binner maintained a fluid relationship with Kirchner and his wife and successor, President Cristina Fernández de Kirchner. Binner joined UCR Congressman Ricardo Alfonsín in the Civic and Social Agreement during the early stages of the 2011 general election campaign. Their alliance ended in May, however, and on June 11, Binner formally announced his candidacy for President of Argentina. He nominated Córdoba Province Senator Norma Morandini as his running mate on their Progressive Front ticket. Antonio Bonfatti, the Minister of Government and State Reform during Binner's tenure and a longtime friend and ally of his from their Medical School days, was elected to succeed Binner as Governor of Santa Fe in the July 24, 2011 gubernatorial election.

== 2011 presidential campaign ==
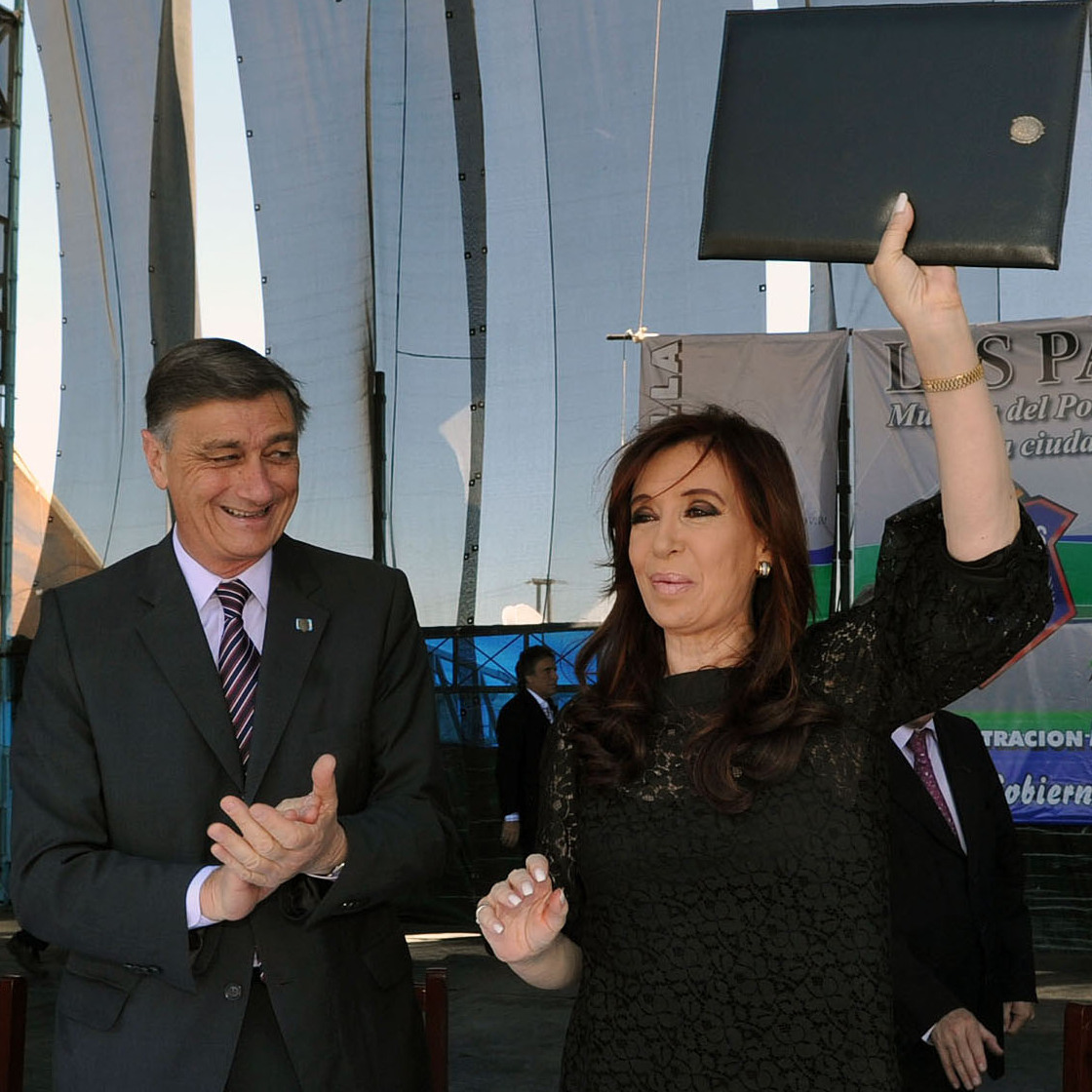
Binner with his rival, Cristina Fernández, in November 2011, a month after the 2011 Argentine general election

On June 11, 2011, the Socialist Congress voted for the candidature for presidential elections: Hermes Binner - Norma Morandini. That candidature was in representation of the Broad Progressive Front, a grouping launched in Buenos Aires in June 2011. In this new alliance participated the Socialist Party, with other parts of the so called "democratic left": New Party, Generation for a National Encounter, Freemen of the South Movement and Buenos Aires for Everyone.

On August 14, 2011, in the primary elections for the presidency he came fourth with 11% of the votes. On October 23, 2011, in the general elections for the presidency he came second with 17% of the vote, behind Cristina Fernández de Kirchner.

== Death ==
Binner was admitted to a geriatric hospital in 2019, due to his Alzheimer's and kidney problems. He died there from pneumonia on June 26, 2020, at the age of 77.

== Bibliography ==
- Daniel Attala (2011). Hermes Binner. Primer gobernador socialista de la Argentina. Diálogos. Buenos Aires: Losada. ISBN 978-950-03-9848-0 (in Spanish)

Political offices
Preceded by Jorge Obeid	Governor of Santa Fe; 2007–2011	Succeeded by Antonio Bonfatti
Preceded by Héctor Cavallero	Mayor of Rosario; 1995–2003	Succeeded by Miguel Lifschitz
