= 2011 Argentine general election =

- Presidential election
- 23 October 2011
- Registered: 28,916,183
- Turnout: 79.39%
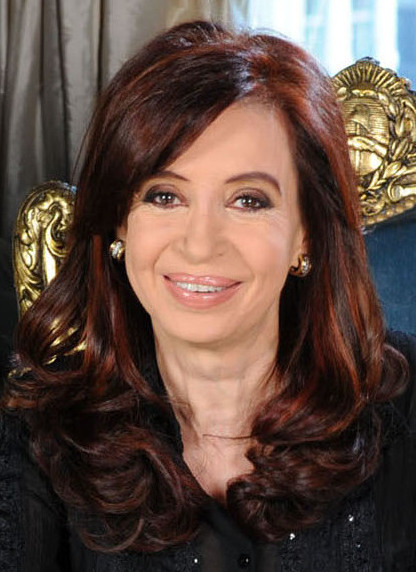

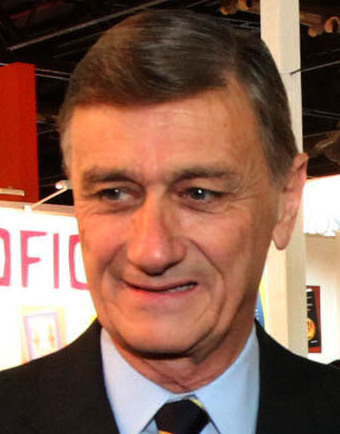

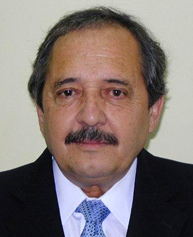

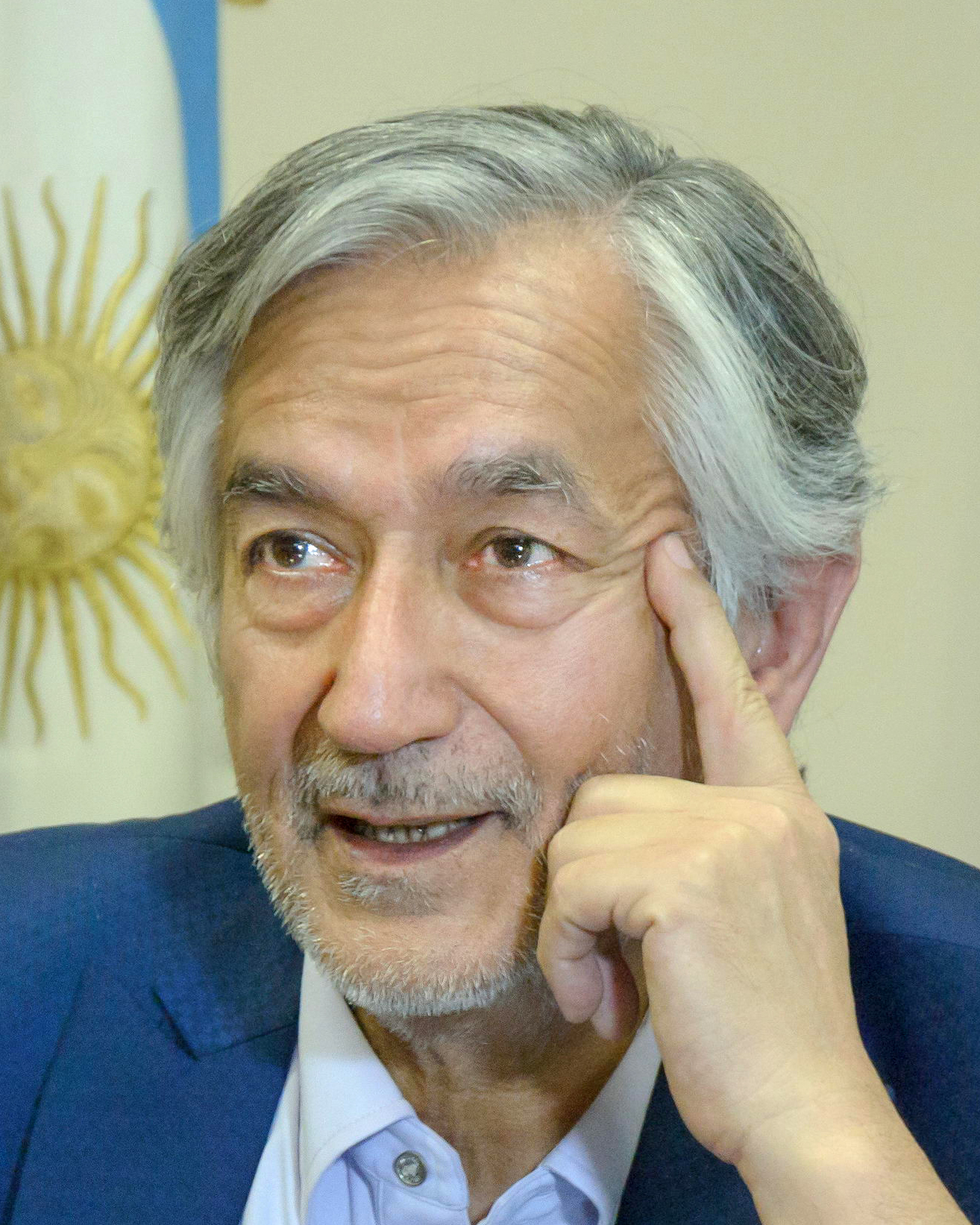

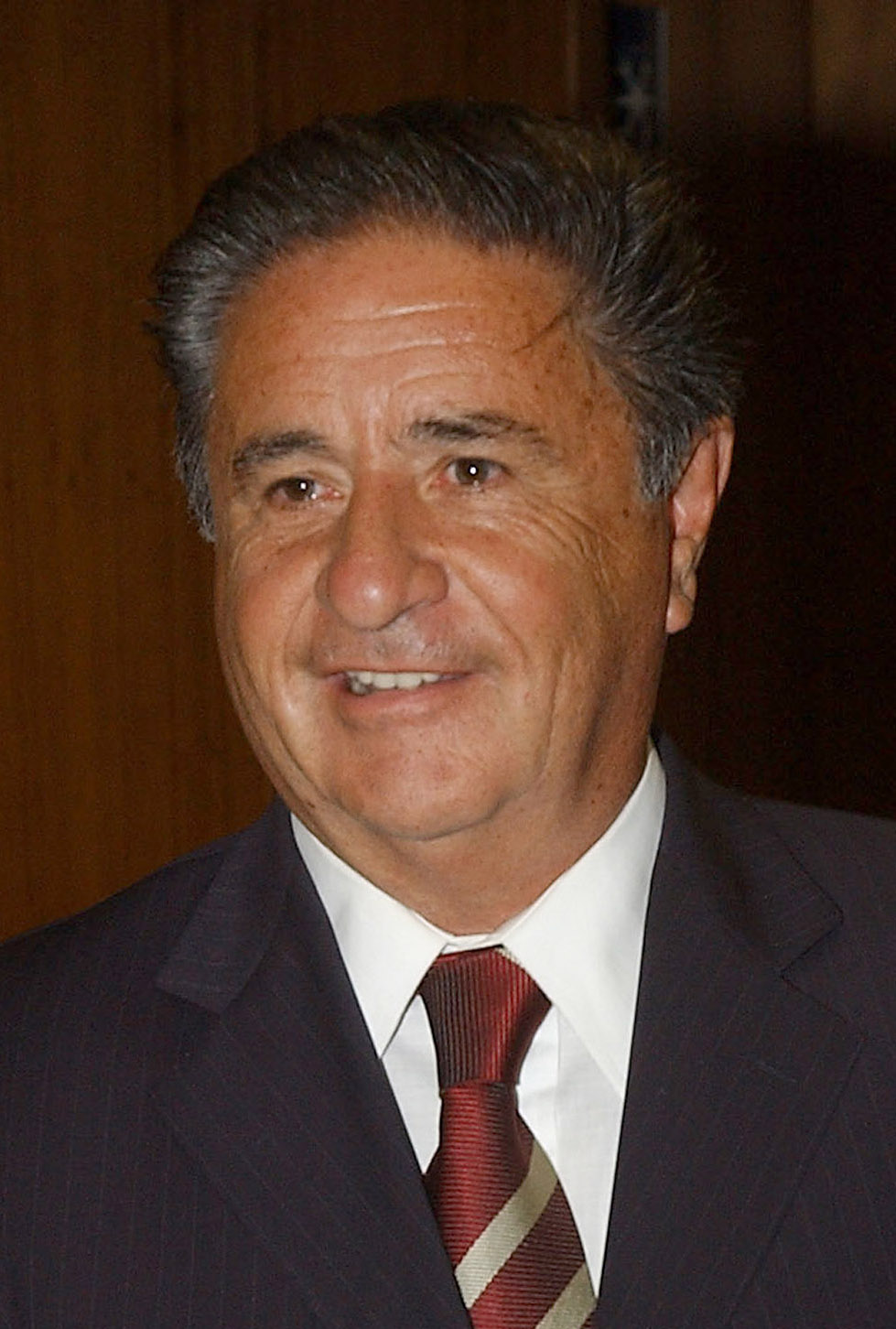
Nominee	Cristina Fernández de Kirchner	Hermes Binner	Ricardo Alfonsín
Party	PJ	Socialist Party	UCR
Alliance	FPV-PJ	FAP	UDESO
Running mate	Amado Boudou	Norma Morandini	Javier González Fraga
States carried	22 + CABA	0	0
Popular vote	11,865,055	3,684,970	2,443,016
Percentage	54.11%	16.81%	11.14%
Nominee	Alberto Rodríguez Saá	Eduardo Duhalde
Party	EP	PJ
Alliance	CF	Federal Peronism
Running mate	José María Vernet	Mario das Neves
States carried	1	0
Popular vote	1,745,354	1,285,830
Percentage	7.96%	5.86%
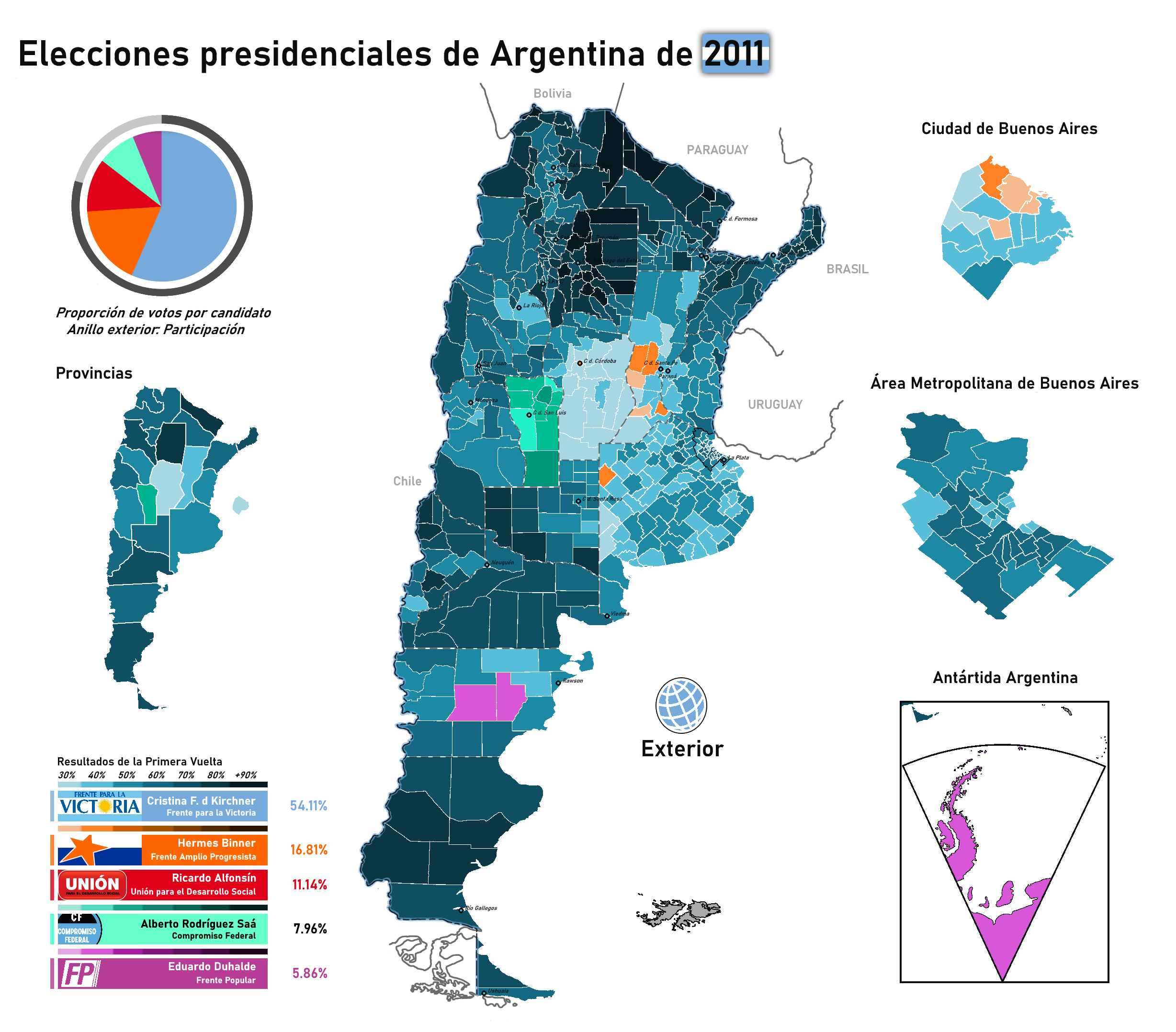
- Results by province and department.
President before election
Cristina Fernández de Kirchner
FPV-PJ
Elected President
Cristina Fernández de Kirchner
FPV-PJ
- Chamber of Deputies
- 23 October 2011
- 130 of the 257 seats in the Chamber of Deputies
- Turnout: 79.39%
Party	Vote %	Seats	+/–
Front for Victory	52.22	85	+41
Union for Social Development	13.55	16	−14
Broad Progressive Front	13.50	14	+8
Federal Commitment	6.21	6	−15
Popular Front	5.45	2	+2
Civic Coalition ARI	3.00	1	−6
Republican Proposal	2.07	3	−6
Neuquén People's Movement	0.43	1	−1
Rioja Popular Front	0.21	1	+1
Fuegian People's Movement	0.07	1	+1
This lists parties that won seats. See the complete results below.
- Senate
- 23 October 2011
- 24 of the 72 seats in the Senate
- Turnout: 81.75%
Party	Vote %	Seats	+/–
Front for Victory	57.28	15	+7
Union for Social Development	11.96	3	−8
Broad Progressive Front	11.31	1	−2
Federal Commitment	6.91	3	+3
Rioja Popular Front	0.56	2	+2
This lists parties that won seats. See the complete results below.
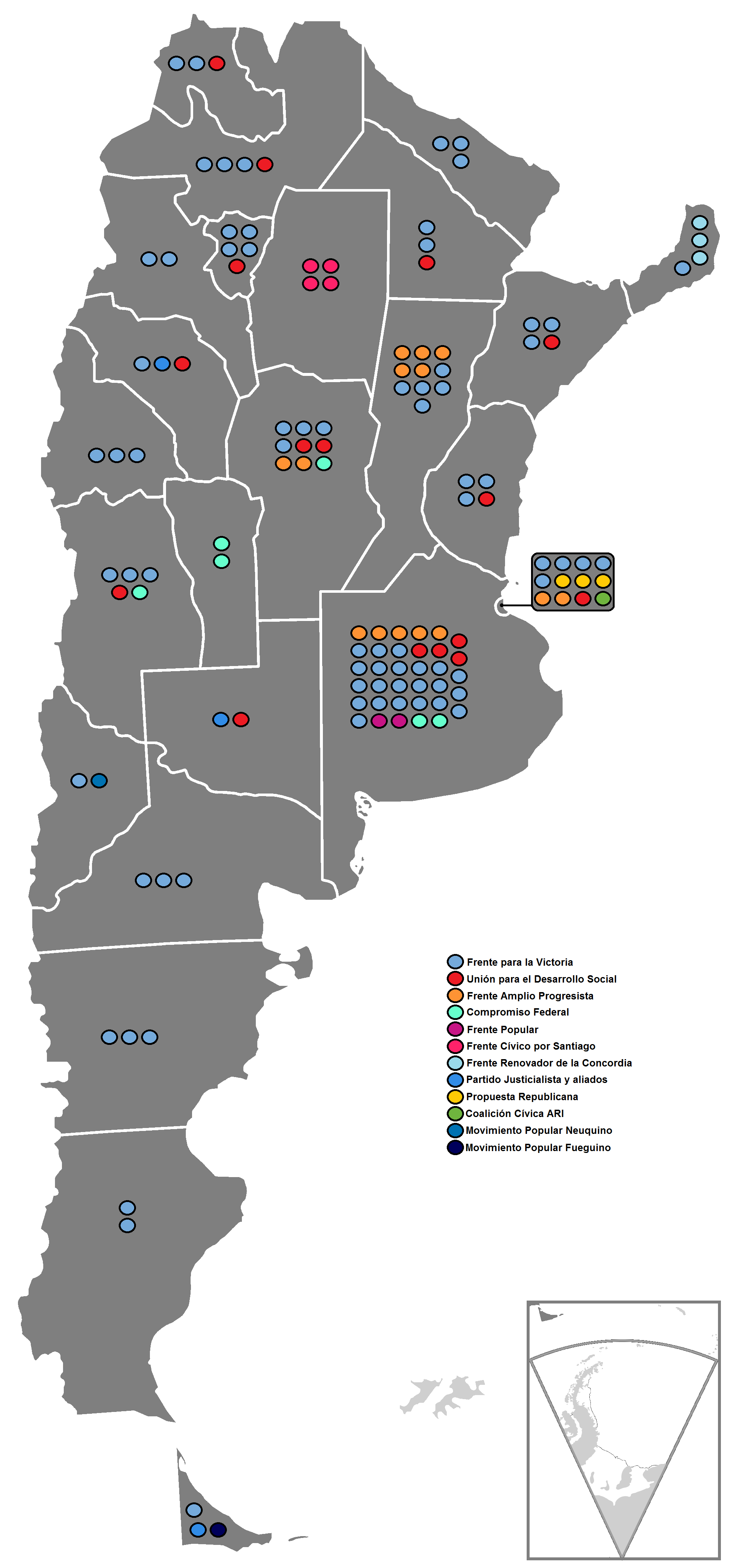
Chamber of Deputies results by province

General elections were held in Argentina on Sunday, 23 October 2011. Incumbent president Cristina Fernández de Kirchner of the Front for Victory won in a landslide, with 54% of the vote, securing a second term in office. The Front for Victory won just over half of the seats in the National Congress.

Mercosur Parliamentarians were also popularly elected for the first time. Another novelty was the introduction of open, simultaneous and mandatory primaries. These took place 14 August 2011 to select the candidates of each political party or coalition.

== Presidential campaign ==
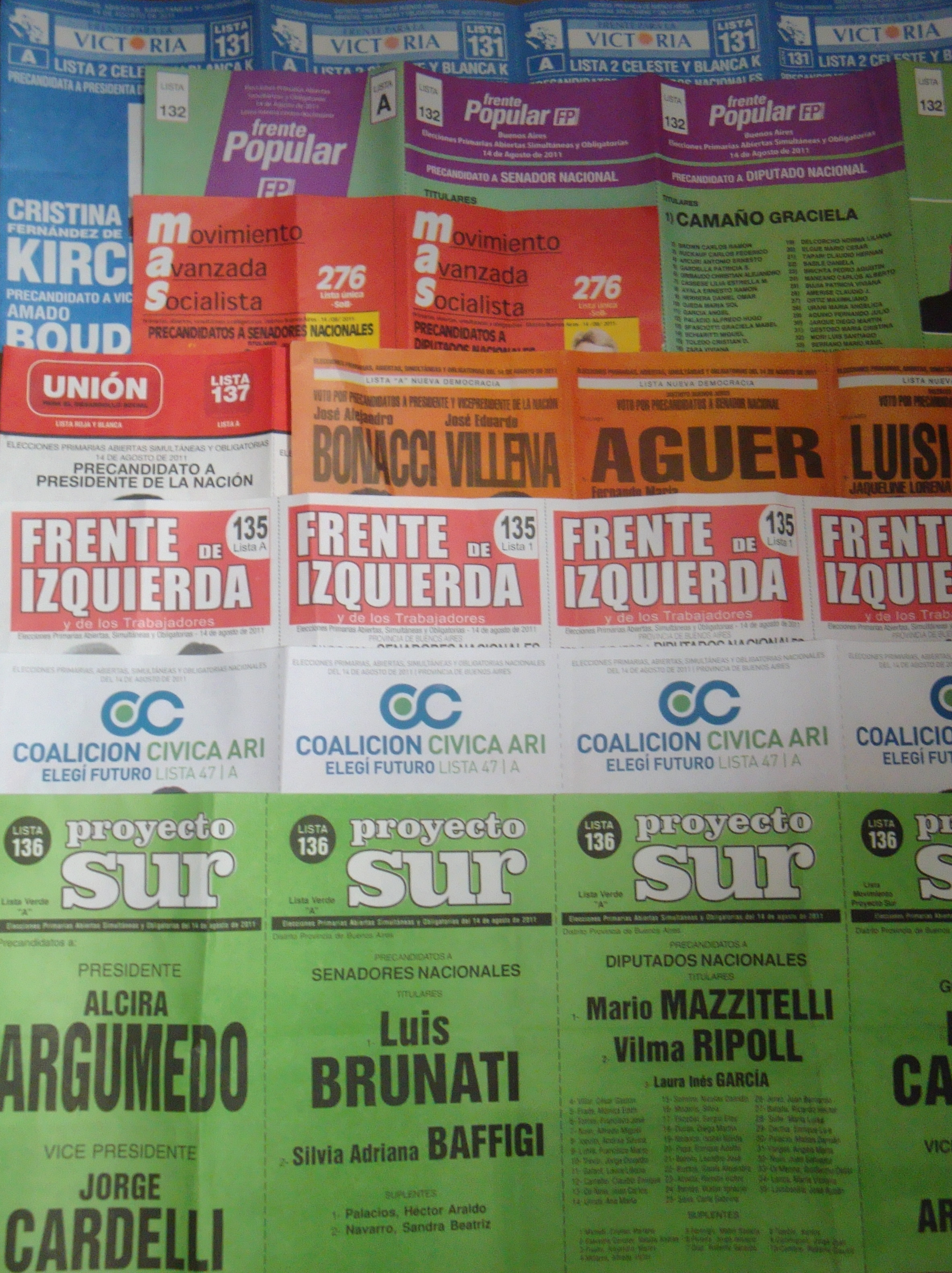
Ballots used in the primary elections on 14 August.

The nation's myriad parties forged seven coalitions, of which five became contenders for a possible runoff election:

- Front for Victory: the ruling party, led by President Cristina Fernández de Kirchner, and allies, including the New Encounter. The FPV is mostly based on the center-left Justicialist Party (PJ) factions that support the current government.
- Federal Peronism, or Dissident Peronism: centrist or conservative PJ figures opposed to the government and allies, including the Republican Proposal. This coalition remained divided between Eduardo Duhalde's Popular Front and Alberto Rodríguez Saá's Federal Commitment both before and after the August primaries.
- Union for Social Development: the Radical Civic Union (UCR), led by Congressman Ricardo Alfonsín, and allies, which initially included Federal Peronist Francisco de Narváez.
- Broad Progressive Front: the Socialist Party, led by Governor Hermes Binner, and allies, including GEN and the New Party. Proyecto Sur had briefly joined this coalition.
- Civic Coalition: the party, led by Congresswoman Elisa Carrió, had been part of the Civic and Social Agreement, but separated from the latter in August 2010.

Other coalitions of note include the Workers' Left Front, led by Jorge Altamira, and Proyecto Sur, led by Pino Solanas; the latter left the Socialist Party-led coalition and instead formed an alliance with the MST and the PSA.

The Civic and Social Agreement was an alliance between the UCR and most of what became the Progressive Ample Front and the Civic Coalition, with other, minor allies. This coalition proved unwieldy as the 2011 campaign progressed, however, though various forms of it will be retained in certain provinces for strategic purposes.

=== Front for Victory (incumbents) ===
The Front for Victory (FPV) candidate for the Justicialist Party primaries was current President Cristina Fernández de Kirchner. Her husband and predecessor, Néstor Kirchner, was considered a top candidate to succeed her until his death on 27 October 2010.

She had suffered a significant decline in approval during the 2008 Argentine government conflict with the agricultural sector and the subsequent recession, and the ruling Front for Victory lost its absolute majority in both houses of Congress during the June 2009 mid-term elections. The economy, and her approval ratings, recovered steadily during 2010, however, and the 2011 electoral season began with Fernández de Kirchner's job approval at around 58 percent, with polling indicating that she would likely be reelected in the first round.

She avoided committing herself to running for a second term during the early months of 2011. Two days before the 23 June deadline, however, she announced her decision to run for reelection. She nominated the nation's Economy Minister, Amado Boudou, as her running mate on 25 June. Their ticket won a landslide victory in the 14 August primaries, obtaining just over 50% and besting the runner-up (Alfonsín) by nearly 38%; they won in the City of Buenos Aires and in every province except San Luis (won by Rodríguez Saá).

Support for Fernández de Kirchner was strongest among the poor (65.2%) and those aged 30 to 44 (54.6%). Her support was weakest among the upper middle class (43.5%), though she remained over 24% ahead of the runner-up (Binner) among those polled within that segment.

=== Federal Peronists ===
The leaders of the center-right Federal Peronism were torn between running for primary elections within the PJ against the Front for Victory, or running instead in the general election through another political alliance. Former President Eduardo Duhalde was the first to informally start his pre-candidacy campaign, announcing hypothetical cabinet picks as early as December 2009. The Governors of Chubut, Mario Das Neves, and of San Luis, Alberto Rodríguez Saá, as well as former Governor of Buenos Aires Province Felipe Solá, also stated their intention to run for president. Das Neves became the first Federal Peronist to drop out, while Solá boosted his own prospects by securing an alliance with the conservative Republican Proposal (PRO) on 16 May. Duhalde narrowly defeated Rodríguez Saá in a Buenos Aires Federal Peronism primary held on 22 May, though both men remained front-runners for their party's nomination. Ultimately, each ran on separate Federal Peronist tickets.

Duhalde formally announced his Popular Union candidacy on 9 June, nominating Das Neves as his running mate. Rodríguez Saá, in turn, nominated former Santa Fe Governor José María Vernet as his running mate on his Federal Commitment ticket. Solá, who struggled in the polls, withdrew on 11 June, encouraging local candidates in his fold to form alliances with Duhalde and the party's candidate for Buenos Aires Governor, Francisco de Narváez. De Narváez later endorsed Rodríguez Saá.

Support for Duhalde was strongest among the working class (14.2%) and weakest among young voters (3.9%). Rodríguez Saá polled best among upper middle class voters (14%) and those age 30 to 44 (11.9%); worst among the poor.

=== Radical Civic Union ===
The center-left Radical Civic Union had scheduled primaries for 28 April. Both Ricardo Alfonsín, son of the late former President Raúl Alfonsín, and current party leader Ernesto Sanz started pre-candidacy campaigns; Sanz, however, dropped out on 28 April. Vice President Julio Cobos, considered a likely UCR primary candidate, had stated his intention to run only in August, during the coalition primaries; he dropped out in April as well.

The UCR and the Socialist Party (partners in the Civic and Social Agreement) parted ways in May 2011, with Alfonsín and Santa Fe Governor Hermes Binner running on separate slates for the primaries in August, and likely in the general election, as well. Alfonsín secured an alliance with Federal Peronist candidate Francisco de Narváez in Buenos Aires Province, De Narváez ran for governor with his senior partner's endorsement in return for his support for Alfonsín's presidential campaign. Alfonsín nominated former Central Bank President Javier González Fraga, a non-partisan economist close to both the UCR and Federal Peronism, as his running-mate on 2 June.

De Narváez withdrew his endorsement of Alfonsín in favor of Rodríguez Saá following the 14 August primaries, though he continued his campaign for Governor of Buenos Aires with Alfonsín's endorsement.

Alfonsín's support was strongest among those age 45 to 59 (14.6%), and weakest among young voters (5.3%).

=== Socialists ===
Binner endorsed GEN leader Margarita Stolbizer for Governor of Buenos Aires following his break with Alfonsín, and formally announced his Broad Progressive Front candidacy on 11 June; he nominated Córdoba Senator Norma Morandini as his running mate. His alliance with Pino Solanas was dissolved the following week, however, and the Proyecto Sur leader instead joined a coalition of minor, left-wing parties.

Binner, despite obtaining fourth place, fared better than expected by local analysts in the 14 August primary, and became the runner-up in subsequent polls. His support was strongest among the middle (18.8%) and upper middle classes (18.9%), while weakest among the poor (6.5%); among the broad age groups, voters 30 to 44 were the most supportive (19.3%).

=== Civic Coalition ===
The leader of the centrist Civic Coalition, Elisa Carrió, reversed her earlier intention to opt out of the 2011 race, and following the departure of her Civic Coalition from the Civic and Social Agreement formed in 2009 with the UCR, she announced her candidacy for president on 12 December 2010. Carrió withdrew her presidential bid following a poor showing in the 14 August primaries, where she obtained 3%.

=== Other candidates ===
Numerous other candidates, or potential candidates, dropped out in May 2011, notably Buenos Aires Mayor Mauricio Macri, who instead sought a second term as mayor, and left-wing film maker Fernando Solanas (who ran unsuccessfully for the same post). Solanas nominated Congresswoman Alcira Argumedo as Proyecto Sur's candidate for president on 22 June. The 14 August primary effectively ended Argumedo's campaign, as well as those of Neighbors' Action Movement (MAV) candidate Sergio Pastore, and People's Countryside Party (PCP) candidate José Bonacci; neither had reached the requisite 1.5% threshold needed to advance to the general election.

The candidate for the Workers' Left Front (FIT), Jorge Altamira, fared unexpectedly well and advanced to the general election. Altamira polled best among the poor (7.9%) and among the upper middle class (5.4%).

== Opinion polls ==
Numerous consulting firms conducted polling throughout the campaign, whereby respondents chose from a number of declared or potential first-round candidates.

Pollster	Date published	Alfonsín	Binner	Carrió	Duhalde	Fernández de Kirchner	Macri	Rodríguez Saá	Others	DK/NR	Source
Ibarómetro	12 January	12.1	–	–	10.4	40.0	8.7	–	4.2	–	
Opinión Autenticada	9 March	11.6	–	3.9	7.2	30.5	12.6	3.1	19.4	11.7	
Aresco	7 April	9.6	–	6.6	14.2	49.9	12.7	–	6.9	–	
Equis	28 April	6.1	–	2.4	5.3	44.0	11.1	–	14.4	16.9	
Aresco	16 May	10.8	–	7.2	15.3	45.1	*	–	–	–	
Ibarómetro	16 May	12.0	–	–	–	44.6	9.9*	9.0	–	–	
OPSM	16 May	18.4	–	5.1	11.1	41.7	*	7.3	–	–	
Ricardo Rouvier	16 May	22.3	–	4.8	6.6	49.8	*	6.0	–	–	
Isonomía	25 May	12.6	5.6	8.0	10.1	41.2	*	5.4	9.3	–	
OPSM	7 June	14.6	13.4	4.8	9.7	40.8	*	8.2	–	10.5	
CEOP	12 June	12.8	4.3	5.9	7.5	48.2	*	5.5	4.5	8.4	
Management & Fit	12 June	15.3	5.1	4.0	5.8	33.4	*	7.0	1.1	23.5	
Nueva Comunicación	14 June	16.7	8.0	8.0	12.3	34.3	*	8.0	3.7	9.3	
Aresco	20 June	14.0	7.5	6.9	16.3	40.5	*	5.1	9.7	–	
Aresco	28 July	15.3	6.9	8.2	21.1	36.1	*	3.6	8.8	–	
Graciela Römer & Asoc.	1 August	15.9	6.3	5.5	9.9	40.4	*	4.1	1.0	16.9	
Opinión Autenticada	1 August	19.7	5.2	4.0	13.1	38.1	*	6.1	1.1	12.0	
Equis	28 August	8.2	13.4	1.4*	7.6	52.1	*	9.9	4.8	2.6	
Nueva Comunicación	12 September	7.6	15.8	1.5*	9.1	51.7	*	8.8	1.7	3.8	
OPSM	2 October	9.8	13.9	3.5*	5.7	45.7	*	8.5	2.5	10.4	
Analogías	3 October	9.0	13.2	1.1*	6.8	52.9	*	5.2	--	12.0	
Equis	7 October	7.8	14.8	1.4*	6.5	52.6	*	10.6	1.1	4.8	
Giacobbe & Asoc.	21 October	9.1	16.6	*	7.9	53.1	*	10.2	3.1	--	

* Withdrew

=== Favourability ===
A poll conducted by Mora y Araujo for Ipsos on 28 September revealed favourability and unfavourability ratings for six of the seven candidates appearing on the general election ballot.

Candidate	Favorable	Unfavorable	Neither/NR	Net Approval
Ricardo Alfonsín	29%	61%	10%	−32%
Hermes Binner	39%	32%	29%	7%
Elisa Carrió	15%	74%	11%	−59%
Eduardo Duhalde	21%	74%	5%	−53%
Cristina Fernández de Kirchner	65%	33%	2%	32%
Alberto Rodríguez Saá	40%	46%	14%	−6%

== Results ==
=== Primary elections ===
Open primary elections for the Presidency were held nationwide on 14 August.

With this system, all parties run primary elections in a same general elections. All parties must take part in it, both the parties with internal factions and parties with a single candidate list. Citizens may vote for any candidate of any party, but may only cast a single vote. The most voted candidate of parties gaining 1.5% or higher of the valid votes will be allowed to run in the main elections.

Candidate	Running mate	Party	Votes	%
Cristina Fernández de Kirchner	Amado Boudou	Front for Victory	10,762,217	47.98
Ricardo Alfonsín	Javier González Fraga	Union for Social Development	2,614,211	11.65
Eduardo Duhalde	Mario Das Neves	Popular Front	2,595,996	11.57
Hermes Binner	Norma Morandini	Broad Progressive Front	2,180,110	9.72
Alberto Rodríguez Saá	José María Vernet	Federal Commitment	1,749,971	7.80
Elisa Carrió	Adrián Pérez	Civic Coalition ARI	689,033	3.07
Jorge Altamira	Christian Castillo	Workers' Left Front	527,237	2.35
Alcira Argumedo	Jorge Cardelli	Proyecto Sur	190,094	0.85
Sergio Pastore	Gilda Rodríguez	Neighbourhood Action Movement	65,031	0.29
José Bonacci	José Villena	People's Countryside Party	48,774	0.22
Blank votes			1,007,753	4.49
Total			22,430,427	100.00
Valid votes			22,430,427	98.79
Invalid/blank votes			274,951	1.21
Total votes			22,705,378	100.00
Registered voters/turnout			28,861,216	78.67
Source: DINE

=== President ===
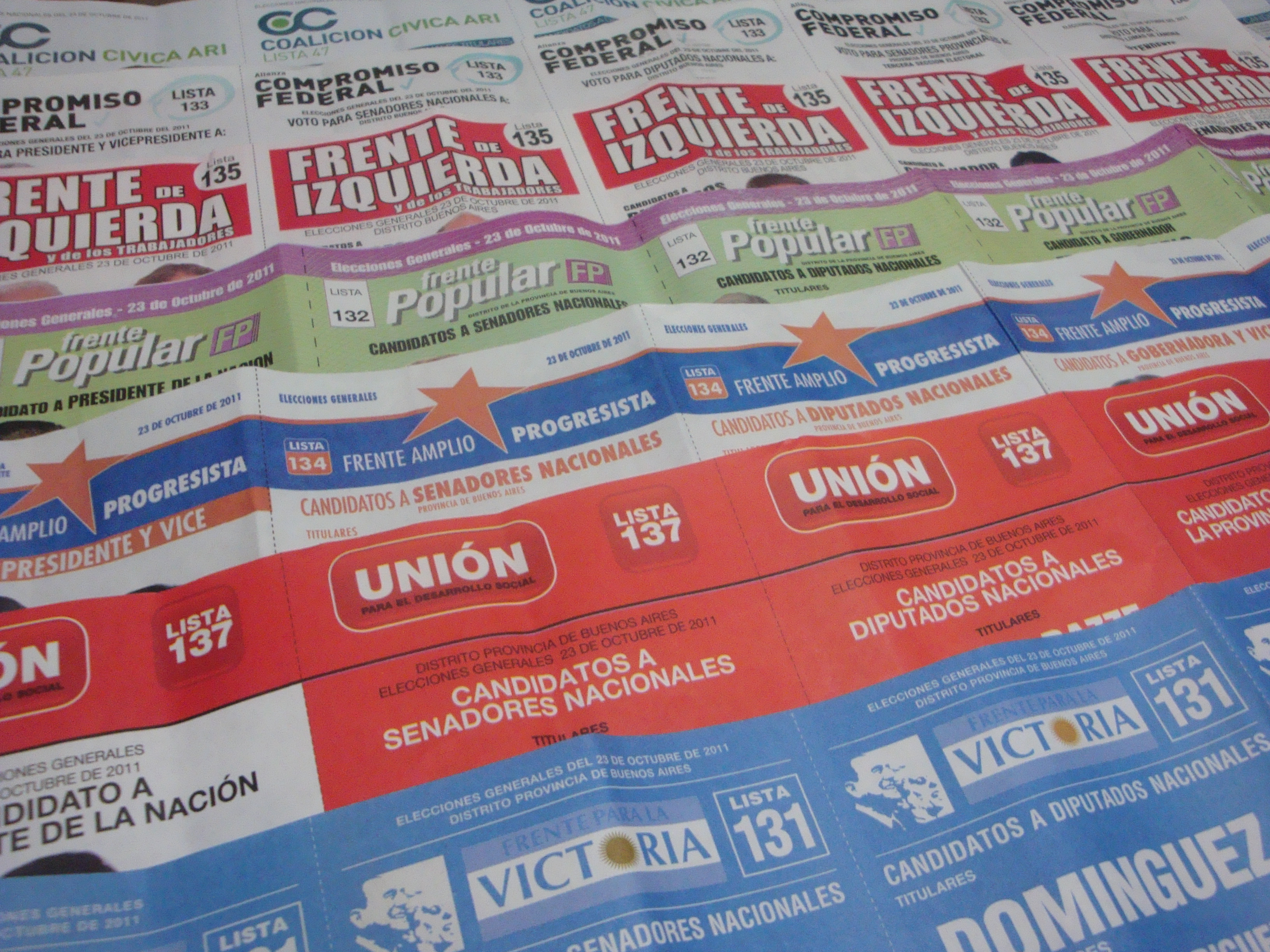
Ballot papers for the presidential election.

The president and vice-president were chosen directly in a two-round system election. Candidates who obtained less than 1.5% during the preliminary round on 14 August were excluded from the general election on 23 October.

Early results on election night awarded incumbent president Cristina Fernández de Kirchner of the Front for Victory (FPV) a second, four-year term. Winning in the City of Buenos Aires and every province except San Luis (won by Federal Commitment candidate Alberto Rodríguez Saá), she became the first candidate to obtain an absolute majority of the popular vote (54%) since Raúl Alfonsín in 1983, and upon completion of ballot processing, the margin of victory (37.1%) exceeded Juan Perón's record 36% margin obtained in 1973. Fernández de Kirchner became the first woman re-elected as head of state in Latin American history.

Candidate	Running mate	Party	Votes	%
Cristina Fernández de Kirchner	Amado Boudou	Front for Victory	11,865,055	54.11
Hermes Binner	Norma Morandini	Broad Progressive Front	3,684,970	16.81
Ricardo Alfonsín	Javier González Fraga	Union for Social Development	2,443,016	11.14
Alberto Rodríguez Saá	José María Vernet	Federal Commitment	1,745,354	7.96
Eduardo Duhalde	Mario Das Neves	Popular Front	1,285,830	5.86
Jorge Altamira	Christian Castillo	Workers' Left Front	503,372	2.30
Elisa Carrió	Adrián Pérez	Civic Coalition ARI	399,685	1.82
Total			21,927,282	100.00
Valid votes			21,927,282	95.52
Invalid votes			225,741	0.98
Blank votes			803,362	3.50
Total votes			22,956,385	100.00
Registered voters/turnout			28,916,183	79.39
Source: DINE, Ministry of the Interior

=== Chamber of Deputies ===
All 23 provinces and the city of Buenos Aires held elections to renew half of the Chamber of Deputies (lower house). Each province and the autonomous city elects a number of at-large representatives on a party list system roughly proportional to their population, and no province is allotted fewer than five Deputies. The system used to know how many deputies per party in each district is D'Hondt method.

Early projections suggested that President Cristina Kirchner's FpV would increase their representation in the Lower House from 87 seats (out of 257), to around 116; the presence of an estimated ten allies would put them three votes shy of an absolute majority.

Party or alliance		Votes	%	Seats
Party or alliance		Votes	%	Won
Front for Victory	Front for Victory	10,121,281	49.13	76
Front for Victory	Civic Front for Santiago	280,201	1.36	4
Front for Victory	Front for the Renewal of Concord	249,429	1.21	3
Front for Victory	Humanist Party	88,347	0.43	1
Front for Victory	Justicialist Party	11,695	0.06	1
Front for Victory	Popular Encounter	6,851	0.03	0
Front for Victory	Total	10,757,804	52.22	85
Union for Social Development	Union for Social Development	1,619,602	7.86	10
Union for Social Development	Radical Civic Union	1,061,504	5.15	5
Union for Social Development	Civic and Social Front	93,442	0.45	1
Union for Social Development	Federal Party	16,416	0.08	0
Union for Social Development	Total	2,790,964	13.55	16
Broad Progressive Front	Broad Progressive Front	2,568,457	12.47	14
Broad Progressive Front	Socialist Party	158,588	0.77	0
Broad Progressive Front	Generation for a National Encounter	40,314	0.20	0
Broad Progressive Front	Freemen of the South Movement	13,625	0.07	0
Broad Progressive Front	Total	2,780,984	13.50	14
Federal Commitment	Federal Commitment	1,192,771	5.79	6
Federal Commitment	Independent Movement of Retirees and Unemployed	59,668	0.29	0
Federal Commitment	Provincial Union	20,494	0.10	0
Federal Commitment	Partido Es Posible	5,684	0.03	0
Federal Commitment	Total	1,278,617	6.21	6
Popular Front	Popular Front	729,920	3.54	2
Popular Front	Popular Union	132,131	0.64	0
Popular Front	People's Reconstruction Party	52,277	0.25	0
Popular Front	Salta Front	50,894	0.25	0
Popular Front	Autonomist Party	45,629	0.22	0
Popular Front	Independent Party of Chubut	45,351	0.22	0
Popular Front	Christian Democratic Party	24,590	0.12	0
Popular Front	Tucumán Popular Change	21,161	0.10	0
Popular Front	Independent Renewal Movement	14,924	0.07	0
Popular Front	Integration and Development Movement	3,517	0.02	0
Popular Front	Fortress Party	1,531	0.01	0
Popular Front	Federal Republican Agreement	1,344	0.01	0
Popular Front	Total	1,123,269	5.45	2
Civic Coalition ARI	Civic Coalition ARI	599,966	2.91	1
Civic Coalition ARI	Citizen Participation Movement	9,716	0.05	0
Civic Coalition ARI	Union for Liberty	8,065	0.04	0
Civic Coalition ARI	Total	617,747	3.00	1
Workers' Left Front	Workers' Left Front	499,557	2.43	0
Workers' Left Front	Workers' Party	61,638	0.30	0
Workers' Left Front	Socialist Left	28,919	0.14	0
Workers' Left Front	Total	590,114	2.86	0
Republican Proposal		427,429	2.07	3
Neuquén People's Movement		88,197	0.43	1
Proyecto Sur	Proyecto Sur	33,229	0.16	0
Proyecto Sur	Workers' Socialist Movement	9,937	0.05	0
Proyecto Sur	South Encounter	4,720	0.02	0
Proyecto Sur	Total	47,886	0.23	0
Rioja Popular Front		42,736	0.21	1
Jujuy First Front		25,025	0.12	0
Fuegian People's Movement		13,788	0.07	1
Citizen Dignity		7,491	0.04	0
Patagonian Social Party		4,712	0.02	0
Popular Party of Tierra del Fuego		1,363	0.01	0
City in Action Party		947	0.00	0
Total		20,599,073	100.00	130
Valid votes		20,599,073	89.74	
Invalid votes		217,232	0.95	
Blank votes		2,138,970	9.32	
Total votes		22,955,275	100.00	
Registered voters/turnout		28,916,230	79.39	
Source: DINE, Ministry of the Interior

==== Results by province ====
Province	FPV			UDESO			FAP			CF			Others		
Province	Votes	%	Seats	Votes	%	Seats	Votes	%	Seats	Votes	%	Seats	Votes	%	Seats
Buenos Aires	4,592,054	57.10	22	928,027	11.54	4	1,043,165	12.97	5	447,291	5.56	2	1,031,907	12.83	2
Buenos Aires City	548,305	29.16	5	132,049	7.02	1	316,476	16.83	2	108,663	5.78	—	774,733	41.20	4
Catamarca	123,706	68.42	2	40,338	22.31	—	7,312	4.04	—	—	—	—	9,440	5.22	—
Chaco	323,418	62.06	2	115,254	22.11	1	35,439	6.80	—	—	—	—	47,053	9.03	—
Chubut	153,206	60.68	3	31,900	12.63	—	—	—	—	8,197	3.25	—	59,176	23.44	—
Córdoba	633,868	34.97	4	368,463	20.33	2	366,754	20.23	2	215,816	11.91	1	227,809	12.57	—
Corrientes	294,306	65.82	3	86,120	19.26	1	24,878	5.56	—	—	—	—	41,867	9.36	—
Entre Ríos	340,282	58.72	3	104,565	18.05	1	85,138	14.69	—	20,494	3.54	—	28,983	5.00	—
Formosa	183,412	79.75	3	43,694	19.00	—	—	—	—	—	—	—	2,875	1.25	—
Jujuy	152,726	55.19	2	71,168	25.72	1	11,408	4.12	—	5,684	2.05	—	35,766	12.92	—
La Pampa	88,347	56.92	1	53,104	34.21	1	—	—	—	8,131	5.24	—	5,635	3.63	—
La Rioja	55,716	38.33	1	35,219	24.23	1	—	—	—	—	—	—	54,434	37.45	1
Mendoza	384,892	46.76	3	200,238	24.33	1	50,595	6.15	—	139,732	16.98	1	47,665	5.79	—
Misiones	346,880	68.40	4	75,160	14.82	—	26,168	5.16	—	14,530	2.86	—	44,422	8.76	—
Neuquén	90,475	33.18	1	25,893	9.50	—	32,152	11.79	—	—	—	—	124,127	45.53	1
Río Negro	202,873	70.10	3	34,788	12.02	—	33,527	11.58	—	—	—	—	18,215	6.29	—
Salta	332,671	56.51	3	103,162	17.52	1	27,042	4.59	—	14,684	2.49	—	111,164	18.88	—
San Juan	216,015	69.29	3	22,290	7.15	—	—	—	—	60,240	19.32	—	13,217	4.24	—
San Luis	59,725	29.46	—	22,429	11.06	—	—	—	—	120,570	59.47	2	—	—	—
Santa Cruz	74,846	65.41	2	22,516	19.68	—	3,474	3.04	—	—	—	—	13,597	11.88	—
Santa Fe	725,350	41.41	5	115,440	6.59	—	623,357	35.59	5	77,798	4.44	—	209,528	11.96	—
Santiago del Estero	338,853	85.90	4	29,536	7.49	—	13,625	3.45	—	—	—	—	12,481	3.16	—
Tierra del Fuego	33,647	55.01	2	4,880	7.98	—	—	—	—	—	—	—	22,643	37.02	1
Tucumán	462,231	60.97	4	124,731	16.45	1	80,474	10.61	—	36,787	4.85	—	53,967	7.12	—
Total	10,757,804	52.22	85	2,790,964	13.55	16	2,780,984	13.50	14	1,278,617	6.21	6	2,990,704	14.52	9

=== Senate ===
Eight districts (Buenos Aires Province, Formosa, Jujuy, La Rioja, Misiones, San Juan, San Luis and Santa Cruz) also elected three National Senators each (two for the most voted party or coalition, one for the second most voted party or coalition), to renew a third of the upper house.

The opposition fared better in the Senate, which remained nearly unchanged; the upper house would continue divided between the FpV with a majority of 40 seats (out of 72), and the UCR (around 16) and others with the remainder. The departure of Vice President Julio Cobos of the UCR (distanced politically from the President since 2008) deprived the opposition of a tie-breaking vote in the Senate.

Party or alliance		Votes	%	Seats
Party or alliance		Votes	%	Won
Front for Victory	Front for Victory	5,483,110	54.73	13
Front for Victory	Front for the Renewal of Concord	256,137	2.56	2
Front for Victory	Total	5,739,247	57.28	15
Union for Social Development	Union for Social Development	966,717	9.65	1
Union for Social Development	Radical Civic Union	231,542	2.31	2
Union for Social Development	Total	1,198,259	11.96	3
Broad Progressive Front	Broad Progressive Front	1,103,922	11.02	1
Broad Progressive Front	Socialist Party	29,564	0.30	0
Broad Progressive Front	Total	1,133,486	11.31	1
Federal Commitment	Federal Commitment	686,740	6.85	3
Federal Commitment	Partido Es Posible	5,681	0.06	0
Federal Commitment	Total	692,421	6.91	3
Popular Front	Popular Front	652,280	6.51	0
Popular Front	Popular Union	3,239	0.03	0
Popular Front	Fortress Party	1,456	0.01	0
Popular Front	Federal Republican Agreement	1,441	0.01	0
Popular Front	Total	658,416	6.57	0
Workers' Left Front	Workers' Left Front	285,489	2.85	0
Workers' Left Front	Workers' Party	3,026	0.03	0
Workers' Left Front	Total	288,515	2.88	0
Civic Coalition ARI		196,033	1.96	0
Rioja Popular Front		56,409	0.56	2
Jujuy First Front		24,127	0.24	0
Republican Proposal		11,527	0.12	0
Renewal Crusade		10,873	0.11	0
Citizen Dignity		7,450	0.07	0
South Encounter		2,151	0.02	0
Total		10,018,914	100.00	24
Valid votes		10,018,914	90.24	
Invalid votes		70,403	0.63	
Blank votes		1,013,390	9.13	
Total votes		11,102,707	100.00	
Registered voters/turnout		13,581,951	81.75	
Source: DINE, Ministry of the Interior

==== Results by province ====
Province	FPV			UDESO			FAP			CF			Others		
Province	Votes	%	Seats	Votes	%	Seats	Votes	%	Seats	Votes	%	Seats	Votes	%	Seats
Buenos Aires	4,639,554	56.78	2	880,892	10.78	—	1,092,503	13.37	1	484,318	5.93	—	1,073,189	13.13	—
Formosa	179,985	78.39	2	46,732	20.35	1	—	—	—	—	—	—	2,897	1.26	—
Jujuy	157,364	53.43	2	85,825	29.14	1	11,419	3.88	—	5,681	1.93	—	34,238	11.62	—
La Rioja	53,865	33.82	1	37,477	23.53	—	—	—	—	—	—	—	67,936	42.65	2
Misiones	354,906	68.98	3	75,600	14.69	—	25,958	5.05	—	14,542	2.83	—	43,496	8.45	—
San Juan	214,776	66.84	2	22,450	6.99	—	—	—	—	60,238	18.75	1	23,871	7.43	—
San Luis	60,516	28.78	1	22,130	10.52	—	—	—	—	127,642	60.70	2	—	—	—
Santa Cruz	78,281	65.83	2	27,153	22.83	1	3,606	3.03	—	—	—	—	9,874	8.30	—
Total	5,739,247	57.28	15	1,198,259	11.96	3	1,133,486	11.31	1	692,421	6.91	3	1,255,501	12.53	2

=== Provincial ===
All but two of the 23 provinces also elected governors and provincial legislative officials on staggered dates through the year, and nine of them will hold elections on the same day as the General Elections. There will be also simultaneous local elections, whereby a number of Municipalities elect municipal legislative officials (concejales), and in some cases also a mayor (or equivalent).

Some of the most high-profile gubernatorial races include that of Governor of Buenos Aires Province (the nation's largest), where Governor Daniel Scioli of the FpV defeated Federal Peronist Deputy Francisco de Narváez, and in Santa Fe Province, where the incumbent Socialist Governor, Hermes Binner, would run for president. Socialist nominee Antonio Bonfatti was elected to succeed him. The Mayor of Buenos Aires, Mauricio Macri faced Senator Daniel Filmus of the FpV and film-maker Fernando Solanas of Proyecto Sur. He was overwhelmingly re-elected in a runoff vote held on 31 July.

Results throughout the year and in the general election handed candidates for the FpV or its allies the governor's house in every province except San Luis (won by Federal Commitment) and Santa Fe (won by the Socialist Party).
