= Front for Victory =

Former political coalition in Argentina

Front for Victory Frente para la Victoria
- Abbreviation: FPV
- Leader: Cristina Fernández de Kirchner
- Founder: Néstor Kirchner
- Founded: 1 March 2003
- Dissolved: 12 June 2019
- Succeeded by: Citizen's Unity
- Headquarters: Riobamba 460 2º A, Buenos Aires
- Youth wing: La Cámpora
- Membership (2012): 153,000
- Ideology: Peronism; Kirchnerism; Social democracy; Left-wing nationalism; Left-wing populism
- Political position: Left-wing
- Members: List: Justicialist Party Broad Front Intransigent Party Federal Party Humanist Party Communist Party Partido de la Victoria Partido Solidario KOLINA Encuentro por la Democracia y la Equidad Partido de la Concertación Forja Frente H.A.C.E.R por el Progreso Social Partido por la Soberanía Popular

The Front for Victory (Spanish: Frente para la Victoria, FPV) was a left-wing Peronist electoral alliance in Argentina, and is formally a faction of the Justicialist Party. Former presidents Néstor Kirchner and Cristina Fernández de Kirchner were elected as representatives of this party.

The Front for Victory is ideologically identified with what has been called Kirchnerism. Legally, the Front should not be confused with the Victory Party, which is just one of the political parties in it.

== History ==
Due to internal disagreements over leadership, the Justicialist Party did not participate as such in the 2003 presidential elections, so the Front for Victory was established on behalf of the presidential candidacy of Néstor Kirchner, in opposition to two other Peronist tickets (Carlos Menem's Front for Loyalty and Adolfo Rodríguez Saá's Front of the Popular Movement).

At the 2005 legislative elections the FPV, again running against other Peronist lists, won 50 of the 127 elected deputies (out of 257) and 14 of the 24 elected senators (out of 72), thus obtaining the majority in both Houses of Congress.

At the 2007 presidential election, FPV rallied through the Plural Consensus alliance, including non-PJ candidates. Its presidential candidate Cristina Fernández de Kirchner won the Presidency on the first round, obtaining 45.29% of the total votes, some 22% ahead of her nearest challenger (Elisa Carrió for the Civic Coalition alliance), this being the widest margin any candidate had got on any modern election held in Argentina at that time.

At the 2009 mid-term legislative election, the FPV lost its congressional majorities in both chambers, gaining just 30.80% of the national votes, thus narrowly becoming the first minority party at the Argentine National Congress, while the Civic and Social Agreement (ACyS) alliance arrived a close second.

At the October 2011 elections, however, Cristina Fernández de Kirchner secured her re-election with 54.11% of the votes in the first round (a percentage only surpassed in Argentina by Juan Perón and Hipólito Yrigoyen), and a 38% lead over her nearest challenger (Hermes Binner of the Broad Progressive Front alliance), much widening its former performance of 2007. With 11,864,456 votes, Cristina Fernández also became the most voted person in the history of Argentine democracy, and the FPV achieved a first-time third consecutive mandate for a Peronist alliance.

At the 2013 legislative election, the FPV and its allies marginally won the elections, maintaining its dominance over both chambers of the Congress.

== Principles ==
The Front for Victory has a Declaration of Principles headed by the motto: "Argentina, conviction and ability to build a new country."

The coalition has been described as left-wing progressive and Peronist in its political orientation. The main postulates of the front were increases of basic salary, expanding the coverage and lowering requirements necessary for retirement and pension, universal public healthcare, implementation of nuclear energy network, increasing spending on education, and protective policies for women and the elderly.

The FPV takes its principles from what it calls an "intolerable" gap between the rich and the poor, and questions the role of those political parties allied to the regime in the 2001 crisis that affected the country. Hence "the vital need of deepening a process of social justice, which by leaving behind a past most Argentines want to overcome, will allow the construction of a new space for political and institutional management in Argentina".

The Declaration of Principles finishes explaining that "imagining and building a new country requires conviction and ability for joining the pieces of a fragmented society and the will to do so, not from a single political party, but from the formation of a broad national front which can bring us back as a Nation this Argentina that can't wait any longer".

== Member parties ==
The Front for Victory is composed of :

Party	Main ideology	Leader/s
Justicialist Party	Peronism	Eduardo Fellner
Broad Front	Social democracy	Adriana Puiggrós
Communist Party (EC)	Marxism-Leninism	Pablo Pereyra
Humanist Party	Humanism	Eshter Sosa
Radicales K	Kirchnerism	Several

== Presidency of Nestor Kirchner: 2003-2007 ==
In 2003 the FPV with the candidacy of Nestor Kirchner came second in the presidential elections with 22% of the vote, behind former president Carlos Menem with 24%. As provided in the Constitution, corresponded settling the election in a runoff, but Menem, with polls favoring Kirchner by more than 60%, withdrew from it, being for that reason elected President of Argentina, Nestor Carlos Kirchner, for the period 2003-10 December 2007.

At that time (2003) Front of Victory had the decisive support of the leaders of Buenos Aires with involvement of the "duhaldismo", political force of whom until then was President Eduardo Duhalde. In the 2005 elections (governors and legislators) there was a break between the Peronist Kirchner and Duhalde, which led to the exclusion of the latter from the Front for Victory and electoral confrontation between the two sectors. The decision to move against corporate economic, agricultural and livestock sector employers of soybean roots caused the confrontation. In 2005, FPV presented as presidential candidate Cristina Fernandez de Kirchner, while duhaldismo introduced Hilda "Chiche" González de Duhalde, the wife of the former president, being Cristina the first winner by a large margin.

During the Kirchner administration an advance payment of the total debt to the International Monetary Fund was made, declaring the aim of ending the subjection of the respective national economic policies to the international body. Afterwards a swap debt is performed, which began renegotiations for the bonds that had been in default since 2001.

As a symbol of his administration, pursued an active policy to promote human rights. His government incorporated members of recognized human rights organization and prompted the prosecution of those responsible for crimes against humanity that occurred during the 70s, made by the Triple A and the government of National Reorganization Process. To carry it out, supporters in Congress voted the cancellation of the laws of Due Obedience and Full Stop, which had remained restraining such judgments since the government of Raul Alfonsin. This decision was subsequently ratified by the Judicial.

Regarding international policy, in November of that year was held in Mar del Plata the IV Summit of the Americas, where Kirchner said a rejection of the ALCA, proposed by the United States. This is considered the foundational moment for UNASUR.

Nestor Carlos Kirchner died on 27 October 2010. He was 60 years old.

== Presidency of Cristina Fernandez de Kirchner: 2007-2015 ==
On 18 July 2007, Senator of FPV, Cristina Fernandez de Kirchner was presented as the alliance's candidate for the presidential elections of October.

On 28 October the candidate of the Front for Victory, Cristina Fernandez won the general election with 45.29%, leading by over 22 points to Elisa Carrio (Civic Coalition). The formula was imposed in almost all provincial districts and thus became the first woman elected to the office of President of Argentina. She assumed this role on 10 December 2007.

One of the first steps taken by President Fernandez was the creation of the Ministry of Science, Technology and Innovation, designating responsible Lino Barañao, a renowned molecular biologist. The move was accompanied by the announcement of the creation of a scientific-technological centre in Buenos Aires, composed of three institutes: Social and Human Sciences, Biomedical Sciences and Biotechnology and Sciences Tecnológicas.

On the 11 March 2008, the Argentine Economy Minister Martin Lousteau, announced the enactment of Resolution 125 / In the month of March 2008 was passed Resolution 125/2008, establishing a new system of export duties on exports, holding its increase or decrease to international price developments. This caused a conflict with the large estate owners from the agricultural sector, who protested against the government's decision to change the tax system of exports. During the protest, the landowners and main producers declared a series of measures such as roadblocks for national disruption of basic food supply and of long distance transportation and agricultural exports, making partial lockouts (lock out) of roadblocks and other ports and direct action measures. President Cristina Fernandez suspended the resolution and sent Congress a bill on the tax on exports of grains and compensation for small and medium producers, so it was the legislature that ultimately resolved the situation. The project received preliminary approval in Congress, but the vote in the Senate was not successful, scoring the equalizer in the vote, and was the vice president of the Nation Julio Cleto Cobos (President of the Senate), who had negative tie by voting against the project.

The government focused on making social action measures, among which we can highlight the Connect Equality program by ANSES (Social Security Administration) consisting of the delivery and commissioning of two million netbooks with Internet access to all public elementary and secondary schools. The Universal Child Allowance, which generalizes the family allowance per child for all children under 18 whose parents are unemployed or work in the informal economy for pay no more than the minimum wage, vital and mobile, including monotributistas. This benefit was extended to pregnant women over 12 weeks gestation.

Along with these, there were also redistributive public policies, such as increasing the percentage of GDP spent on education which grew from 3.64% in 2003 to 6.02% in 2010. In absolute terms, increased from 14.501 million pesos in 2003 to 89,924,000 pesos in 2010, a 520% more. School construction, between 2003 and 2010 were built over a thousand schools benefiting half a million students, the second period of increased school construction in the history of Argentina. It also promoted the adoption of the Law of mobility retirement, which sets a minimum of two annual increases in pensions. In addition, measures were taken as the recovery of Aerolineas Argentinas and Austral Airlines, which was proposed by a bill introduced by President Fernández to rescue companies, by approving the agreement between the National Government and the group Interinvest on 17 July 2008, whereby the Argentine government acquired the shares of these and other related companies. Also through another law, renationalized the Military Aircraft Factory (FMA), given under concession to U.S. company Lockheed Martin in 1995. In 2009, the parliament sent the draft Law on Audiovisual Communication Services, which came to displace the old Media Law, which was passed by the de facto government of Jorge Rafael Videla. - The bill was debated in about 30 forums across the length and breadth of the country, which exposed citizens, journalists, owners of radio and TV channels, and managed to introduce some 140 amendments on a 150-points proposal. - Finally the bill was passed by a comfortable majority in both legislative chambers. - The project raged the government's confrontation with the major media outlets of Argentina, facing a strong campaign to discredit her image. - In 2011, the confrontation with the media worsened after boosting in parliament a bill to declare of public interest the manufacture of paper for newsprint. - Finally, the law was passed and Papel Prensa, the only producer of the product in Argentina, to then in the hands of the two major newspapers in the country, went on to provide the material at the same price to all who required it daily. - In terms of sovereignty, Cristina Fernandez de Kirchner has taken steps towards resuming negotiations with the United Kingdom over the Falkland Islands. - On 16 April 2012 announced the involvement in the oil company YPF (Fiscal Oilfields), whose majority stake was owned by the Spanish company Repsol, which had previously been questioned by deficiencies in oil supplies and new explorations. Also sent to Congress a bill to expropriate 51% of the shares and regain state control over the nonrenewable natural resource. - The announcement drew a resounding support from the public and most of the political spectrum, both the ruling party and opposition. - Finally, the draft became law by a large majority in both houses of parliament. -

== Electoral history ==
=== Presidential elections ===
Election year	Candidate(s)	First Round		Second Round		Result	Note
Election year	Candidate(s)	# votes	% vote	# votes	% vote	Result	Note
2003	Néstor Kirchner	4,312,517	22.25	Unopposed		✓ 2nd-R Unopposed	a faction of PJ
2007	Cristina Kirchner	8,651,066	45.29			✓ Elected	a faction of PJ
2011	Cristina Kirchner	11,865,055	54.11			✓ Elected	a faction of PJ
2015	Daniel Scioli	9,338,490	37.08	12,317,330	48.66	✗ Lost	a faction of PJ

=== Congressional elections ===
==== Chamber of Deputies ====
Election year	votes	%	seats won	Total seats	Position	Presidency	Note
2003	5,511,420	35.1	58 / 130	129 / 257	Majority	Eduardo Duhalde (PJ)	including the other PJ factions
2005	5,071,094	29.9	50 / 127	75 / 257	Minority	Néstor Kirchner (FPV—PJ)	
2007	5,557,087		56 / 130	106 / 257	Minority	Néstor Kirchner (FPV—PJ)	
2009	1,679,084	8.8	14 / 127	70 / 257	Minority	Cristina Kirchner (FPV—PJ)	
2011	10,121,311	49.1	76 / 130	90 / 257	Minority	Cristina Kirchner (FPV—PJ)	
2013	7,487,839	33.2	42 / 127	132 / 257	Majority	Cristina Kirchner (FPV—PJ)	
2015	8,237,074		60 / 130	96 / 257	Minority	Cristina Kirchner (FPV—PJ)	

==== Senate elections ====
Election year	votes	%	seats won	Total seats	Position	Presidency	Note
2003	1,852,456	40.7	13 / 24	41 / 72	Majority	Eduardo Duhalde (PJ)	including the other PJ factions
2005	3,572,361	45.1	14 / 24	14 / 72	Minority	Néstor Kirchner (FPV—PJ)	
2007	1,048,187		8 / 24	22 / 72	Minority	Néstor Kirchner (FPV—PJ)	
2009	756,695		4 / 24	12 / 72	Minority	Cristina Kirchner (FPV—PJ)	
2011	5,470,241	54.6	13 / 24	24 / 72	Minority	Cristina Kirchner (FPV—PJ)	
2013	1,608,866	32.1	11 / 24	40 / 72	Majority	Cristina Kirchner (FPV—PJ)	
2015			12 / 24	39 / 72	Majority	Cristina Kirchner (FPV—PJ)	

== See also ==
- Kirchnerism
