= Freemen of the South Movement =

Political party in Argentina

Freemen of the South Movement Movimiento Libres del Sur
- President: Humberto Tumini
- Founded: April 26, 2006
- Headquarters: Buenos Aires, Argentina
- Student wing: Movimiento Universitario Sur
- Membership: 47,596 (2016)
- Ideology: Progressivism; Democratic socialism Social democracy Left-wing nationalism Left-wing populism Latinamericanism
- Political position: Centre-left to left-wing
- National affiliation: Federal Consensus
- International affiliation: São Paulo Forum
- Seats in the Chamber of Deputies: 0 / 257

Website
- http://libresdelsur.org.ar

The Free of the South Movement (Spanish: Movimiento Libres del Sur) is a centre-left political party created in 2006 in Argentina. It is made up of the Movimiento Barrios de Pie, the Agrupación Martín Fierro, the Frente Barrial 19 de Diciembre and the Corriente Patria Libre.

== History ==
In the 2007 Argentine general election, the movement had two of its members elected as national representatives in the Lower House of the Argentine National Congress, Cecilia Merchan and Victoria Donda, daughter of desaparecidos. They were elected on the lists of the ruling Front for Victory faction of the Justicialist Party and sit in the block of the Popular and Social Encounter.

== See also ==
- Politics of Argentina
