= List of political parties in Argentina =

This article lists political parties in Argentina.

Argentina has a multi-party system with two strong political parties or alliances, and various smaller parties that enjoy representation at the National Congress.

Since the 1990s, there is a strong decentralizing tendency within the national parties, along with the growing national relevance of province-level parties and alliances. In the last decade, most of the newly formed parties remained as junior partners of the main alliances or as district-level relevant political forces.

== Historic background ==
From the "national organisation" process (1862–80) up to 1916, the oligarchic National Autonomist Party directed Argentine politics, before being replaced, through the first secret ballot elections, by the Radical Civic Union. The "Infamous Decade" (1930–43), initiated by the first modern coup d'état in Argentina, represented a return of the conservatives, who implemented a so-called "patriotic fraud" electoral practice. Since 1946, the strongest party has been the Justicialist Party, emerging around the leadership of Juan Perón (when not banned, justicialists lost only four presidential elections, in 1983, 1999, 2015, and 2023). From 1946 to 2001, the second most important party was the Radical Civic Union, until the 2001 financial crisis. From then on, left-wing Justicialists Néstor Kirchner and his wife Cristina Fernández de Kirchner won the 2003, 2007 and 2011 general elections. After that, in the 2015 general election, Kirchnerism was defeated by a Centre-right coalition, Cambiemos, composed of the Radical Civic Union and Republican Proposal, a new liberal conservative party. However, in the elections of 2019, the Justicialist Party joined the Frente de Todos (a centre-left coalition) which won the presidential elections. The PJ returned to power, with Alberto Fernández as President of the Nation.

Since 10 December 2023, the current-ruling party in Argentina is the Libertarian Party, with Javier Milei as President of the Nation.

== Electoral alliances ==
=== National alliances ===
Alliance		Ideology	Position	Deputies	Senators	Governors	Parties
Homeland Force; Fuerza Patria	FP	Peronism; Kirchnerism	Centre-left	102 / 257	33 / 72	8 / 24	PJ
Homeland Force; Fuerza Patria	FP	Peronism; Kirchnerism	Centre-left	102 / 257	33 / 72	8 / 24	FR
Homeland Force; Fuerza Patria	FP	Peronism; Kirchnerism	Centre-left	102 / 257	33 / 72	8 / 24	ParTE
Homeland Force; Fuerza Patria	FP	Peronism; Kirchnerism	Centre-left	102 / 257	33 / 72	8 / 24	CET
Homeland Force; Fuerza Patria	FP	Peronism; Kirchnerism	Centre-left	102 / 257	33 / 72	8 / 24	CF
Homeland Force; Fuerza Patria	FP	Peronism; Kirchnerism	Centre-left	102 / 257	33 / 72	8 / 24	Kolina
Homeland Force; Fuerza Patria	FP	Peronism; Kirchnerism	Centre-left	102 / 257	33 / 72	8 / 24	PV
Homeland Force; Fuerza Patria	FP	Peronism; Kirchnerism	Centre-left	102 / 257	33 / 72	8 / 24	NE
Homeland Force; Fuerza Patria	FP	Peronism; Kirchnerism	Centre-left	102 / 257	33 / 72	8 / 24	PSUR
Homeland Force; Fuerza Patria	FP	Peronism; Kirchnerism	Centre-left	102 / 257	33 / 72	8 / 24	FG
Homeland Force; Fuerza Patria	FP	Peronism; Kirchnerism	Centre-left	102 / 257	33 / 72	8 / 24	PSOL
Homeland Force; Fuerza Patria	FP	Peronism; Kirchnerism	Centre-left	102 / 257	33 / 72	8 / 24	UP
Homeland Force; Fuerza Patria	FP	Peronism; Kirchnerism	Centre-left	102 / 257	33 / 72	8 / 24	FORJA
Homeland Force; Fuerza Patria	FP	Peronism; Kirchnerism	Centre-left	102 / 257	33 / 72	8 / 24	PCA
Homeland Force; Fuerza Patria	FP	Peronism; Kirchnerism	Centre-left	102 / 257	33 / 72	8 / 24	PCR
Homeland Force; Fuerza Patria	FP	Peronism; Kirchnerism	Centre-left	102 / 257	33 / 72	8 / 24	PI
Homeland Force; Fuerza Patria	FP	Peronism; Kirchnerism	Centre-left	102 / 257	33 / 72	8 / 24	FPG
Homeland Force; Fuerza Patria	FP	Peronism; Kirchnerism	Centre-left	102 / 257	33 / 72	8 / 24	Evita
Homeland Force; Fuerza Patria	FP	Peronism; Kirchnerism	Centre-left	102 / 257	33 / 72	8 / 24	PFP
Homeland Force; Fuerza Patria	FP	Peronism; Kirchnerism	Centre-left	102 / 257	33 / 72	8 / 24	PCP
Together for Change; Juntos por el Cambio	JxC	Conservative liberalism; Conservatism; Social liberalism; Anti-Kirchnerism	Centre to centre-right Factions: Right-wing to far-right	93 / 257	24 / 72	10 / 24	PRO
Together for Change; Juntos por el Cambio	JxC	Conservative liberalism; Conservatism; Social liberalism; Anti-Kirchnerism	Centre to centre-right Factions: Right-wing to far-right	93 / 257	24 / 72	10 / 24	UCR
Together for Change; Juntos por el Cambio	JxC	Conservative liberalism; Conservatism; Social liberalism; Anti-Kirchnerism	Centre to centre-right Factions: Right-wing to far-right	93 / 257	24 / 72	10 / 24	CC-ARI
Together for Change; Juntos por el Cambio	JxC	Conservative liberalism; Conservatism; Social liberalism; Anti-Kirchnerism	Centre to centre-right Factions: Right-wing to far-right	93 / 257	24 / 72	10 / 24	PDP
Together for Change; Juntos por el Cambio	JxC	Conservative liberalism; Conservatism; Social liberalism; Anti-Kirchnerism	Centre to centre-right Factions: Right-wing to far-right	93 / 257	24 / 72	10 / 24	MID
Together for Change; Juntos por el Cambio	JxC	Conservative liberalism; Conservatism; Social liberalism; Anti-Kirchnerism	Centre to centre-right Factions: Right-wing to far-right	93 / 257	24 / 72	10 / 24	UPF
Together for Change; Juntos por el Cambio	JxC	Conservative liberalism; Conservatism; Social liberalism; Anti-Kirchnerism	Centre to centre-right Factions: Right-wing to far-right	93 / 257	24 / 72	10 / 24	UNIR
Together for Change; Juntos por el Cambio	JxC	Conservative liberalism; Conservatism; Social liberalism; Anti-Kirchnerism	Centre to centre-right Factions: Right-wing to far-right	93 / 257	24 / 72	10 / 24	ERF
Together for Change; Juntos por el Cambio	JxC	Conservative liberalism; Conservatism; Social liberalism; Anti-Kirchnerism	Centre to centre-right Factions: Right-wing to far-right	93 / 257	24 / 72	10 / 24	PRF
Together for Change; Juntos por el Cambio	JxC	Conservative liberalism; Conservatism; Social liberalism; Anti-Kirchnerism	Centre to centre-right Factions: Right-wing to far-right	93 / 257	24 / 72	10 / 24	GEN
Liberty Advances; La Libertad Avanza	LLA	Libertarian conservatism; Minarchism; Anti-communism	Right-wing to far-right	40 / 257	7 / 72	0 / 24	PD
Liberty Advances; La Libertad Avanza	LLA	Libertarian conservatism; Minarchism; Anti-communism	Right-wing to far-right	40 / 257	7 / 72	0 / 24	PL
Liberty Advances; La Libertad Avanza	LLA	Libertarian conservatism; Minarchism; Anti-communism	Right-wing to far-right	40 / 257	7 / 72	0 / 24	UCyB
Liberty Advances; La Libertad Avanza	LLA	Libertarian conservatism; Minarchism; Anti-communism	Right-wing to far-right	40 / 257	7 / 72	0 / 24	PRF
Liberty Advances; La Libertad Avanza	LLA	Libertarian conservatism; Minarchism; Anti-communism	Right-wing to far-right	40 / 257	7 / 72	0 / 24	PF
We Do for Our Country; Hacemos por Nuestro País	HpNP or HNP	Federal Peronism; Argentine nationalism; Anti-Kirchnerism	Centre to centre-right	8 / 257	3 / 72	1 / 24	LDS
We Do for Our Country; Hacemos por Nuestro País	HpNP or HNP	Federal Peronism; Argentine nationalism; Anti-Kirchnerism	Centre to centre-right	8 / 257	3 / 72	1 / 24	PS
We Do for Our Country; Hacemos por Nuestro País	HpNP or HNP	Federal Peronism; Argentine nationalism; Anti-Kirchnerism	Centre to centre-right	8 / 257	3 / 72	1 / 24	P3P
Workers' Left Front – United; Frente de Izquierda y de los Trabajadores – Unidad	FIT-U	Trotskyism; Morenism	Left-wing to far-left	5 / 257	0 / 72	0 / 24	PO
Workers' Left Front – United; Frente de Izquierda y de los Trabajadores – Unidad	FIT-U	Trotskyism; Morenism	Left-wing to far-left	5 / 257	0 / 72	0 / 24	PTS
Workers' Left Front – United; Frente de Izquierda y de los Trabajadores – Unidad	FIT-U	Trotskyism; Morenism	Left-wing to far-left	5 / 257	0 / 72	0 / 24	IS
Workers' Left Front – United; Frente de Izquierda y de los Trabajadores – Unidad	FIT-U	Trotskyism; Morenism	Left-wing to far-left	5 / 257	0 / 72	0 / 24	MST
Workers' Left Front – United; Frente de Izquierda y de los Trabajadores – Unidad	FIT-U	Trotskyism; Morenism	Left-wing to far-left	5 / 257	0 / 72	0 / 24	NI

=== Provincial alliances ===
Provincial electoral alliances and coalitions active as of the 2019 general election.

Alliance		Province	Member parties	Representation	
Alliance		Province	Member parties	Upper house	Lower house
We Act for Córdoba; Hacemos por Córdoba	HPC	Córdoba	Member parties: Integration and Development Movement (Note: Only the provincial chapter of this party formed part of this provincial coalition; at the national level, the party formed part of a different national coalition (see above).); Justicialist Party; Christian Democratic Party; Faith Party; Democrat Party; Action for Change; Civic Front of Córdoba; Socialist Party; Generation for a National Encounter; Intransigent Party; Liberal Republican Party; People First Party; Federal Vecinalist Union; Independent Vecinalism; Open Politics for Social Integrity	51 / 70	
Encounter for Corrientes; Encuentro por Corrientes	ECO	Corrientes	Member parties: Radical Civic Union; Civic Coalition ARI; Republican Proposal; Conservative People's Party; Light Blue and White Union; Change, Austerity and Progress; Committed Citizens; Liberal Encounter; Fellows' Encounter; New Country; Action for Corrientes; Growing With Everyone; Liberal Party of Corrientes; New Party; Corrientes People's Party; Corrientes Project	10 / 15	21 / 30
Front for the Renewal of Concord; Frente Renovador de la Concordia	FRC	Misiones	Member parties: Integration and Development Movement; Popular Cause; Liberty, Values and Change; Party of Social Concord; Civic Participation Party; Popular Project Party; Party of Culture, Education and Labour	26 / 40	
Union for Salta; Unión por Salta	UXS	Salta	Member parties: Plural Front; Salta Identity Party; Justicialist Party; Salta Renewal Party; Salta First; Independent Salta Yes; Popular Victory Union	12 / 23	37 / 60
Progressive, Civic and Social Front; Frente Progresista Cívico y Social	FPCyS	Santa Fe	Member parties: Socialist Party; Radical Civic Union; Freemen of the South Movement; Generation for a National Encounter; Democratic Progressive Party; Equality and Participation; Participation, Ethics and Solidarity	1 / 19	28 / 50
Social and Popular Front; Frente Social y Popular	FSP	Santa Fe	Member parties: Revolutionary Communist Party; Popular Union; Patria Grande Front; Free Peoples' League	0 / 19	2 / 50
Civic Front for Santiago; Frente Cívico por Santiago	FCxS	Santiago del Estero	Member parties: Federal Party; Kolina; Neighbourhood Action Movement; Justice and Freedom Movement; Possible Santiago Movement; New Alternative; Centrist Social Party	16 / 40	
Let's All Live Better; Vamos Todos a Vivir Mejor		Tierra del Fuego	Member parties: FORJA Concertation Party; New Encounter; Popular Unity; Solidary Party; Fueguian People's Movement	6 / 15	

== Political parties ==
=== National parties ===
Parties recognized in at least 5 provinces, as of 31 July 2021.

Nº	Political party		Ideology	Deputies	Senators	Governors	Affiliation
1	Integration and Development Movement; Movimiento de Integración y Desarrollo	MID	Developmentalism; Economic liberalism	1 / 257	0 / 72	0 / 24	JxC
2	Justicialist Party; Partido Justicialista	PJ	Peronism; Kirchnerism	91 / 257	36 / 72	12 / 24	FP
3	Radical Civic Union; Unión Cívica Radical	UCR	Radicalism; Social liberalism	45 / 257	20 / 72	3 / 24	JxC
5	Christian Democratic Party; Partido Demócrata Cristiano	PDC	Christian democracy	0 / 257	0 / 72	0 / 24	HpNP
6	Intransigent Party; Partido Intransigente	PI	Democratic socialism; Progressivism	0 / 257	0 / 72	0 / 24	FP
8	Federal Party; Partido Federal	PF	Federalism; Conservatism	0 / 257	0 / 72	0 / 24	—N/a
9	Democratic Progressive Party; Partido Demócrata Progresista	PDP	Liberalism	0 / 257	0 / 72	0 / 24	JxC
12	Communist Party; Partido Comunista	PC	Communism; Marxism–Leninism	0 / 257	0 / 72	0 / 24	FP
13	New Movement for Socialism; Nuevo Movimiento al Socialismo	MAS	Trotskyism; Morenism	0 / 257	0 / 72	0 / 24	—N/a
19	Conservative People's Party; Partido Conservador Popular	PCP	Conservatism; National conservatism	0 / 257	0 / 72	0 / 24	LLA
23	Federal Popular Union; Unión Popular Federal	UPF	Peronism; Conservatism	0 / 257	0 / 72	0 / 24	JxC
33	UNIR Constitutional Nationalist Party; Partido Nacionalista Constitucional UNIR	UNIR PNC	Conservatism; National conservatism	1 / 257	0 / 72	0 / 24	JxC
36	National Autonomist Party; Partido Autonomista Nacional	PAN	Conservatism	0 / 257	0 / 72	0 / 24	—N/a
38	Workers' Socialist Movement; Movimiento Socialista de los Trabajadores	MST	Trotskyism; Morenism	0 / 257	0 / 72	0 / 24	FIT-U
40	Freemen of the South Movement; Movimiento Libres del Sur	LDS	Left-wing nationalism; Social democracy	0 / 257	0 / 72	0 / 24	HpNP
41	Broad Front; Frente Grande	FG	Peronism; Social democracy	2 / 257	0 / 72	0 / 24	FP
47	Civic Coalition ARI; Coalición Cívica ARI	CC-ARI	Social liberalism	11 / 257	0 / 72	0 / 24	JxC
50	Socialist Party; Partido Socialista	PS	Social democracy; Democratic socialism	2 / 257	0 / 72	0 / 24	—N/a
54	Victory Party; Partido de la Victoria	PV	Kirchnerism	0 / 257	1 / 72	0 / 24	FP
57	Neighbourhood Action Movement; Movimiento de Acción Vecinal	MAV	Localism; Centrism	0 / 257	0 / 72	0 / 24	—N/a
61	Socialist Left (Note: Legally registered as the Left for a Socialist Option (Spanish: Izquierda por una Opción Socialista)); Izquierda Socialista	IS	Trotskyism; Morenism	0 / 257	0 / 72	0 / 24	FIT-U
64	Republican Proposal; Propuesta Republicana	PRO	Liberal conservatism	50 / 257	14 / 72	1 / 24	JxC
65	Light Blue and White Union; Unión Celeste y Blanco	UCyB	Federal Peronism; Social conservatism	0 / 257	0 / 72	0 / 24	LLA
66	Solidary Party; Partido Solidario	PSOL	Co-operatism; Socialism	1 / 257	0 / 72	0 / 24	FP
67	National Liberation Current; Corriente de Liberación Nacional	KOLINA	Kirchnerism	2 / 257	0 / 72	0 / 24	FP
68	New Left; Nueva Izquierda	NE	Trotskyism; Morenism	0 / 257	0 / 72	0 / 24	FIT-U
69	Generation for a National Encounter; Generación para un Encuentro Nacional	GEN	Social democracy; Progressivism	0 / 257	0 / 72	0 / 24	JxC
70	Socialist Workers' Party (Note: Legally registered as the Workers' Party for Socialism (Spanish: Partido Socialista de los Trabajadores; PTS)); Partido Socialista de los Trabajadores	PTS	Trotskyism	4 / 257	0 / 72	0 / 24	FIT-U
71	Workers' Party; Partido Obrero	PO	Trotskyism	1 / 257	0 / 72	0 / 24	FIT-U
72	Popular Unity (Note: Legally registered as Electoral Instrument for Popular Unity (Spanish: Instrumento Electoral por la Unidad Popular).); Unidad Popular	UP	Left-wing nationalism; Socialism of the 21st century	0 / 257	0 / 72	0 / 24	FP
73	New Encounter (Note: Legally registered as Encounter for Democracy and Equity (Spanish: Encuentro por la Democracia y la Equidad; EDE).); Nuevo Encuentro	NE	Kirchnerism	2 / 257	0 / 72	0 / 24	FP
74	Revolutionary Communist Party (Note: Legally registered as the Party of Labour and the People (Spanish: Partido del Trabajo y del Pueblo; PTP).); Partido Comunista Revolucionario	PCR	Communism; Marxism–Leninism–Maoism	2 / 257	0 / 72	0 / 24	FP
75	FORJA Concertation Party; Partido de la Concertación FORJA	FORJA	Kirchnerism; K radicalism	1 / 257	0 / 72	0 / 24	FP
76	Party of Culture, Education and Labour; Partido de la Cultura, la Educación y el Trabajo	CET	Peronism; Labourism	1 / 257	0 / 72	0 / 24	FP
77	Faith Party; Partido Fe	FE	Peronism	1 / 257	0 / 72	0 / 24	FP
78	Third Position Party; Partido Tercera Posición	P3P	Peronism; Federal Peronism	1 / 257	0 / 72	0 / 24	HpNP
79	Federal Renewal Party; Partido Renovador Federal	PRF	Peronism	0 / 257	0 / 72	0 / 24	JxC
82	Federal Commitment; Compromiso Federal	CF	Federal Peronism	4 / 257	1 / 72	1 / 24	FP
83	Project South; Proyecto Sur	SUR	Environmentalism; Social democracy	0 / 257	0 / 72	0 / 24	FP
84	Labor and Equity Party; Partido del Trabajo y la Equidad	ParTE	Progressivism; Social democracy	0 / 257	0 / 72	0 / 24	FP
85	Democratic Party; Partido Demócrata	PD	Liberal conservatism	0 / 257	0 / 72	0 / 24	LLA
86	Renewal Front; Frente Renovador	FRA	Peronism; Syncretism	11 / 257	0 / 72	1 / 24	FP
87	Unite for Liberty and Dignity; Unite por la Libertad y la Dignidad	UNITE	Economic liberalism; Libertarianism	0 / 257	0 / 72	0 / 24	LLA
88	Federal Republican Encounter; Encuentro Republicano Federal	ERF	Federal Peronism; National conservatism	1 / 257	0 / 72	0 / 24	JxC
93	Patria Grande Front; Frente Patria Grande	FPG	Kirchnerism; Anti-neoliberalism	3 / 257	0 / 72	0 / 24	FP
95	Patriot Front; Frente Patriota	PF	Neo-fascism	0 / 257	0 / 72	0 / 24	—N/a
96	Liberty Advances; La Libertad Avanza	LLA	Libertarianism	25 / 257	6 / 72	0 / 24	LLA
97	We Act for Our Country; Hacemos por Nuestro País	HpNP	Federal Peronism; Federalism	3 / 257	1 / 72	0 / 24	HpNP

=== Provincial parties ===
Parties recognized in at least one province, as of 31 October 2020.

==== City of Buenos Aires ====
Political party		Ideology	Affiliation
Self-determination and Freedom; Autodeterminación y Libertad	AyL	Libertarian Marxism	—N/a
Let's Advance for Social Progress; Avancemos por el Progreso Social	APPS	Progressivism	FdT
Public Trust; Confianza Pública	CP	Social liberalism	JxC
City in Action Party; Partido de la Ciudad en Acción	PCA	Developmentalism	JxC
People's Progressive Front; Frente Progresista y Popular	FPP	Progressivism	FdT
People's Left / Dignity People's Movement; Izquierda Popular / Movimiento Popular La Dignidad	IP	Socialism	FdT
Pensioners and Youth Movement; Movimiento de Jubilados y Juventud	MJJ	Social conservatism	—N/a
New Leadership; Nueva Dirigencia	ND	Peronism	FdT
Communist Party of Argentina (Extraordinary Congress); Partido Comunista (Congreso Extraordinario)	PCCE	Marxism-Leninism	FdT
Authentic Socialist Party; Partido Socialista Auténtico	PSA	Democratic Socialism	CF
Great Fatherland; Patria Grande	PG	Socialism of the 21st century	FdT
People on the Move; Pueblo en Marcha	PEM	Socialism of the 21st century	FdT
Network for Buenos Aires; Red por Buenos Aires	REDxBA	Peronism	FdT
Let Us Be Free; Seamos Libres	SL	Left-wing nationalism	FdT
Union of the Democratic Centre; Unión del Centro Democrático	UCeDé	Conservative liberalism	FD

==== Buenos Aires Province ====
Political party		Ideology	Affiliation
Bonaerense Current of Thought; Corriente de Pensamiento Bonaerense	COPEBO	Peronism	FdT
Patriot Front; Frente Patriota	FP	Neo-Nazism	—N/a
Open Space for Development and Social Integration; Espacio Abierto para el Desarrollo y la Integación Social	EA	Developmentalism	JxC
People's Front; Frente Popular	FP	Communism	—N/a
Federal Front of Solidary Action; Frente Federal de Acción Solidaria	FFAS	Peronism	FdT
Integrate; Integrar	—N/a	Localism	JxC
Memory and Social Movilization; Memoria y Movilización Social	MeMos	Kirchnerism	FdT
Morality and Progress; Moral y Progreso			—N/a
Socialist Advance Movement; Movimiento Avanzada Socialista	MAS	Trotskyism	—N/a
Federal Integration Movement; Movimiento de Integración Federal	MIF	Peronism	—N/a
Latin American Integration Movement of Social Expression; Movimiento Integración Latinoamericana de Expresión Social	MILES	Socialism of the 21st century	—N/a
Independent Movement of Justice and Dignity; Movimiento Independiente de Justicia y Dignidad	MIDJ	Socialism	—N/a
Social Movement for the Republic; Movimiento Social por la República	MSR	Social liberalism	JxC
Social Movement for Values; Movimiento Social por los Valores	MSV	Peronism	CF
New Leadership; Nueva Dirigencia	ND	Peronism	JxC
New Citizen Union; Nueva Unión Ciudadana	NUC	Christian right	—N/a
Buenos Aires Province Christians' Authentic Party; Partido Auténtico de los Cristianos de la Provincia de Buenos Aires			—N/a
Dialogue Party; Partido de Diálogo		Peronism	JxC
Humanist Party; Partido Humanista	PH	Humanism	—N/a
People's Left Party / Dignity People's Movement; Partido Izquierda Popular / Movimiento Popular La Dignidad	IP	Socialism	FdT
Loyalty and Dignity Party; Partido Lealtad y Dignidad	LyP	Peronism	—N/a
Better Party (Movement for Equality, Justice and Popular Organization); Partido Mejor (Movimiento por la Equidad, Justicia y Organización Popular	MEJOR	Peronism	FdT
Democratic Organization Movement Party; Partido Movimiento de Organización Democrática	MODE		—N/a
New Buenos Aires Party; Partido Nuevo Buenos Aires	—N/a		FdT
Buenos Aires Christian People's Party; Partido Popular Cristiano Bonaerense	PPC	—N/a	FdT
Federal Republican Party; Partido Republicano Federal	PRF	Conservatism	—N/a
Authentic Socialist Party; Partido Socialista Auténtico	PSA	Democratic Socialism	CF
Green Party; Partido Verde	PV	Green politics	FdT
Open Politics for Social Integrity; Política Abierta para la Integridad Social	PAIS	Peronism	FdT
Social Pole; Polo Social	POLO	Peronism	FdT
Federal Proposal for Change; Propuesta Federal para el Cambio	PFC	Developmentalism	JxC
Union of the Democratic Centre; Unión del Centro Democrático	UCeDé	Conservative liberalism	FD

==== Catamarca ====
Political party		Ideology	Affiliation
Bonaerense Current of Thought; Corriente de Pensamiento Bonaerense	COPEBO	Peronism	FdT
We Are Catamarca; Frente Somos Catamarca	FSC	—N/a	
Movilization; Movilización	PM	—N/a	CF
Authentic People's Movement; Movimiento Auténtico Popular	MAP	Peronism	—N/a
Independent Movement of Justice and Dignity; Movimiento Independiente de Justicia y Dignidad	MIDJ	Socialism	—N/a
New Space for Opinions; Nuevo Espacio de Opinión	—N/a		FdT
Martín Fierro Current; Corriente Martín Fierro	CMF	Peronism, Socialism	FdT
Catamarca Unity Party; Partido de la Unidad Catamarqueña	—N/a		
People's Party; Partido Popular	PP	Peronism	—N/a
Political and Social Rebirth; Renacer Político y Social	RPS	Christian right	FC
Populist Unification; Unificación Populista		Populism	FdT
Union of the Democratic Centre; Unión del Centro Democrático	UCeDé	Conservative liberalism	FD

==== Chaco ====
Political party		Ideology	Affiliation
Chaco Action; Acción Chaqueña	ACHA	Conservatism	NOS
Bases and Principles of Chaco; Bases y Principios del Chaco	BYP	Conservatism	JxC
Bonaerense Current of Thought; Corriente de Pensamiento Bonaerense	COPEBO	Peronism	FdT
Independent Movement of Justice and Dignity; Movimiento Independiente de Justicia y Dignidad	MIDJ	Socialism	—N/a
New Space for Participation; Nuevo Espacio de Participación	NEPAR	Radicalism	FdT
Restorative Cause Party; Partido Causa Reparadora	CAR	Kirchnerism	FdT
Citizens To Govern; Ciudadanos A Gobernar	CAG	Conservatism	NOS
Martín Fierro Current; Corriente Martín Fierro	CMF	Peronism, Socialism	FdT
Party for Development and Equality; Partido para el Desarrollo y la Igualdad	PDI	Developmentalism	FC
Social Pole - Base Movement; Polo Social - Movimiento de Bases	PSMB	Peronism	—N/a
Popular Project Party; Partido Proyecto Popular	PP	Kirchnerism	FdT
Socialists United for Chaco; Socialistas Unidos por el Chaco	PSUCh	Socialism of the 21st century	FdT

==== Chubut ====
Political party		Ideology	Affiliation
We Are All Chubut; Chubut Somos Todos; Nid Ydy Chubut i gyd	ChuSoTo	Peronism	FdT
Chubut Social Pole Movement; Movimiento Polo Social Chubut; Mudiad Pegwn Cymdeithasol Chubut	PSC	Green conservatism	—N/a
Chubut Independent Party; Partido Independiente del Chubut; Plaid Annibynol Chubut	PICH	Regionalism	—N/a
Chubut New Horizon Party; Partido Nuevo Horizonte Chubut; Plaid Gorwel Newydd Chubut	—N/a		
Authentic Socialist Party; Partido Socialista Auténtico; Plaid Sosialaidd Dilys	PSA	Democratic socialism	CF

==== Córdoba ====
Political party		Ideology	Affiliation
Action for Change; Acción para el Cambio	APEC	Developmentalism	HPC
Alternative for New Leadership; Alternativa para la Dirigencia Nueva	ADN	Federalism	—N/a
Neighbors' Encounter; Encuentro Vecinal	EV	Social conservatism	NOS
Civic Front of Córdoba; Frente Cívico de Córdoba	FCC	Regionalism	HPC
Federal Front of Solidary Action; Frente Federal de Acción Solidaria	FFAS	Peronism	FdT
Socialist Advance Movement; Movimiento Avanzada Socialista	MAS	Trotskyism	—N/a
Change Córdoba; Cambio Córdoba	—N/a		FdT
Humanist Party; Partido Humanista	PH	Humanism	—N/a
Liberal Republican Party; Partido Liberal Republicano	PLR	Liberalism	HPC
Libertarian Party; Partido Libertario	PL	Libertarianism	FD
People First Party; Partido Primero la Gente	PLG	Conservatism	JxC
Great Fatherland; Patria Grande	PG	Socialism of the 21st century	FdT
Open Politics for Social Integrity; Política Abierta para la Integridad Social	PAIS	Peronism	HPC
People's Party; Partido Popular	PP	Peronism	—N/a
Union of the Democratic Centre; Unión del Centro Democrático	UCeDé	Conservative liberalism	FD
Federal Vecinalist Union; Unión Federal Vecinal	UFV	Localism	HPC
Independent Vecinalism; Vecinalismo Independiente	VI	Localism	HPC

==== Corrientes ====
Political party		Ideology	Affiliation
Action for the Republic; Acción por la República	APR	Peronism	FdT
Change, Austerity and Progress; Cambio, Austeridad y Progreso	CAMAU	—N/a	ECO
Citizens To Govern; Ciudadanos A Gobernar	CAG	Conservatism	NOS
Committed Citizens; Ciudadanos Comprometidos	CiCo	Conservatism	ECO
Liberal Encounter; Encuentro Liberal	ELI	Liberalism	ECO
Fellows' Encounter; Encuentro Correligionario	ELI	Conservatism	ECO
New Country; Nuevo País	NP	Peronism	ECO
Action for Corrientes; Acción por Corrientes	AXC	Regionalism	ECO
Growing With Everyone; Crecer con Todos	CCT	Peronism	ECO
Liberal Party of Corrientes; Partido Liberal de Corrientes	CCT	Liberalism	ECO
New Party; Partido Nuevo	PaNu	Conservatism	ECO
Corrientes People's Party; Partido Popular Correntino	PPC	Conservatism	ECO
Corrientes Project; Proyecto Corrientes	PC	Conservatism	ECO

==== Entre Ríos ====
Political party		Ideology	Affiliation
Entre Ríos Federal Front; Frente Entrerriano Federal	FEF	Peronism	FdT
Movement for All; Movimiento por Todos	MPT	Peronism	FdT
Entre Ríos Social Movement; Movimiento Social Entrerriano	MSE	Liberal conservatism	JxC
Union for Liberty; Unión por la Libertad	UPL	Classical liberalism	JxC

==== Formosa ====
Political party		Ideology	Affiliation
Authentic Formoseño Party; Auténtico Formoseño	AF	Peronism	FdT
Commitment and Effort for Triumph; Compromiso y Esfuerzo para el Triunfo	CEPT	Peronism	FdT
Together We Can; Juntos Podemos	JP	Peronism	FdT
People's Action Movement; Movimiento de Acción Popular	MAP	Peronism	FdT
Independent Movement of Justice and Dignity; Movimiento Independiente de Justicia y Dignidad	MIDJ	Socialism	—N/a
New Country; Nuevo País	NP	Peronism	FAF
Independent Participation Movement Party; Partido Movimiento Independiente de Participación	MIP	Peronism	FdT
Party for the New Man; Partido para el Hombre Nuevo	PHN	Peronism	FdT
Principles and Conviction Party; Partido Principios y Convicción	PyC	Populism	—N/a
Renewal Party of the West; Partido Renovador del Oeste	PRO	Peronism	FdT

==== Jujuy ====
Political party		Ideology	Affiliation
Come On Jujuy; Arriba Jujuy	AJ	Peronism	FdT
Jujuy Change; Cambio Jujeño	—N/a		JxC
Renewal Crusade; Cruzada Renovadora	CR	Federalism	CF
Jujuy Encounter; Encuentro Jujeño	CR	Peronism	FdT
Jujuy Wins; Gana Jujuy	GJ	Populism	JxC
Workers' Left; Izquierda de los Trabajadores	IT	Trotskyism	FIT
Latin American Integration Movement of Social Expression; Movimiento Integración Latinoamericana de Expresión Social	MILES	Socialism of the 21st century	—N/a
Broad North Movement; Movimiento Norte Grande	MNG	Peronism	FdT
Jujuy People's Movement; Movimiento Popular Jujeño	MPJ	Regionalism	—N/a
Workers' White Party; Partido Blanco de los Trabajadores	PBT	Peronism	CF
Party for Popular Sovereignty; Partido por la Soberanía Popular	PSP	Indigenismo	FdT
Jujuy First; Primero Jujuy	PJ	Peronism	JxC
Union for Liberty; Unión por la Libertad	UPL	Classical liberalism	JxC

==== La Pampa ====
Political party		Ideology	Affiliation
Pampa Federalist Movement; Movimiento Federalista Pampeano	MFP	Developmentalism	JxC
Front Party; Partido del Frente	—N/a		FdT
Humanist Party; Partido Humanista	PH	Humanism	—N/a

==== La Rioja ====
Political party		Ideology	Affiliation
People's Front; Frente del Pueblo	FDP	Peronism	FdT
We Are All La Rioja; La Rioja Somos Todos	—N/a		
Loyalty and Dignity Party; Partido Lealtad y Dignidad	LyP	Peronism	—N/a

==== Mendoza ====
Political party		Ideology	Affiliation
Federal Social Action Movement; Movimiento de Acción Social Federal	MASFE	Christian right	—N/a
Green Party; Partido Verde	PV	Green politics	FdT
We Can with The Left; Podemos con la Izquierda	PODEMOS	Trotskyism	FIT
Protector Political Force; Protectora Fuerza Política	PFP	Social democracy	CF
Liberty Advances (Mendoza)	LLA	Mileism Libertarianism	

==== Misiones ====
Political party		Ideology	Affiliation
Popular Cause; Causa Popular	CP	Peronism	FRC
Liberty, Values and Change; Libertad, Valores y Cambio	LVC	Developmentalism	JxC
Agrarian and Social Party; Partido Agrario y Social	PAyS	Agrarianism	FdT
Party of Social Concord; Partido de la Concordia Social	FR	Regionalism	FRC
Civic Participation Party; Partido de la Participación Ciudadana	PPC	Populism	FRC
New October Party; Partido Nuevo Octubre	—N/a		
Social Progress Party; Partido Progreso Social	PPS	Socialism	FdT
Popular Project Party; Partido Proyecto Popular	PP	Peronism	FRC

==== Neuquén ====
Political party		Ideology	Affiliation
The Front and Neuquén Participation; El Frente y la Participación Neuquina	FPN	Peronism	FdT
Workers' Left; Izquierda de los Trabajadores	IT	Trotskyism	FIT
Memory and Social Movilization; Memoria y Movilización Social	MeMos	Kirchnerism	FdT
Neuquén People's Movement; Movimiento Popular Neuquino	MPN	Peronism	—N/a
New Neuquén Commitment; Nuevo Compromiso Neuquino	NCN	Liberal conservatism	JxC
Always; Siempre	SiemPre	Localism	—N/a
Union of Neuquinos; Unión de los Neuquinos	UNE	Labourism	FdT

==== Río Negro ====
Political party		Ideology	Affiliation
Together We Are Río Negro; Juntos Somos Río Negro	JSRN	Regionalism	—N/a
Workers' Left; Izquierda de los Trabajadores	IT	Trotskyism	FIT
River; Río	RIO	Progressivism	FdT

==== Salta ====
Political party		Ideology	Affiliation
Fatherland Now; Ahora Patria	AP	Conservatism	—N/a
Plural Front; Frente Plural	FP	Social liberalism	UXS
Salta Front; Frente Salteño	FS	Peronism	FdT
Happiness Party; Partido Felicidad	FELICIDAD	Peronism	FdT
People's Left / Dignity People's Movement; Izquierda Popular / Movimiento Popular La Dignidad	IP	Socialism	FdT
Memory and Social Movilization; Memoria y Movilización Social	MeMos	Kirchnerism	FdT
Salta Identity Party; Partido Identidad Salteña	PAIS	Peronism	UXS
Salta Renewal Party; Partido Renovador de Salta	PARES	Social conservatism	UXS
Salta First; Primero Salta	1S	Regionalism	UXS
Salta Proposal Party; Partido Propuesta Salteña	PPS	Regionalism	JxC
Salta Unites Us; Salta Nos Une	SNU	Populism	JxC
Independent Salta Yes; Sí Salta Independiente	SÍ	Regionalism	UXS
Everyone for Salta; Todos por Salta	TXS	Regionalism	—N/a
Popular Victory Union; Unión Victoria Popular	LUP	Peronism	UXS

==== San Juan ====
Political party		Ideology	Affiliation
Action for a New Democracy; Acción por una Democracia Nueva	ADN	Pragmatism	—N/a
Federal Conviction; Convicción Federal	CF	Peronism	FdT
Renewal Crusade; Cruzada Renovadora	CR	Federalism	CF
New Leadership; Nueva Dirigencia	ND	Peronism	JxC
Bloquista Party; Partido Bloquista	PB	Populism	FdT
Social Commitment Party; Partido Compromiso Social	PCS	Peronism	FdT
Civic Dignity; Dignidad Ciudadana	DC	Social conservatism	—N/a
Life and Commitment Movement; Movimiento Vida y Compromiso	VyC	Peronism	JxC
Unity and Progress Party; Partido Unidad y Progreso	—N/a		FdT
Open Politics for Social Integrity; Política Abierta para la Integridad Social	PAIS	Peronism	FdT
People's Party; Partido Popular	PP	Peronism	—N/a
Production and Labour; Producción y Trabajo	PyT	Peronism	JxC

==== San Luis ====
Political party		Ideology	Affiliation
Advance San Luis; Avanzar San Luis	ASL	Peronism	JxC
Front for Victory; Frente para la Victoria	FPV	Peronism	FdT
More San Luis; Más San Luis	+SL	Kirchnerism	FdT
Latin American Integration Movement of Social Expression; Movimiento Integración Latinoamericana de Expresión Social	MILES	Socialism of the 21st century	—N/a
San Luis Loyalty Party; Partido de la Lealtad Sanluiseña	PLSL	Peronism	FdT
Unity and Liberty Party; Partido Unión y Libertad	PUL	Peronism	FdT
We Are All San Luis; San Luis Somos Todos	SLST	Regionalism	—N/a

==== Santa Cruz ====
Political party		Ideology	Affiliation
Civic Encounter; Encuentro Ciudadano	CF	Liberal conservatism	NSC
MOVE Santa Cruz; MOVERE Santa Cruz	MOVERE	Localism	—N/a
We Are Energy to Renovate Santa Cruz; Somos Energía para Renovar Santa Cruz	SER	Peronism	FdT

==== Santa Fe ====
Political party		Ideology	Affiliation
Future City; Ciudad Futura	CF	Socialism of the 21st century	—N/a
Free Peoples' League; Liga de los Pueblos Libres	LPL	Socialism of the 21st century	FSP
Independent Movement of Justice and Dignity; Movimiento Independiente de Justicia y Dignidad	MIDJ	Socialism	—N/a
Participation, Ethics and Solidarity; Participación, Ética y Solidaridad	PARES	Progressivism	FPCyS
People's Party; Partido Popular	PP	Peronism	—N/a
Social Progress Party; Partido Progreso Social	PPS	Socialism	FdT
Great Fatherland; Patria Grande	PG	Socialism of the 21st century	FSP
Open Politics for Social Integrity; Política Abierta para la Integridad Social	PAIS	Peronism	FdT
100% Santa Fe; Santafesino 100%	100%SF	Regionalism, peronism	FdT
Union of the Democratic Centre; Unión del Centro Democrático	UCeDé	Conservative liberalism	FD
Union for Liberty; Unión por la Libertad	UPL	Classical liberalism	JxC

==== Santiago del Estero ====
Political party		Ideology	Affiliation
Justice and Freedom Movement; Movimiento Justicia y Libertad	MJL	Peronism	FCxS
Possible Santiago Movement; Movimiento Santiago Viable	MSV	Peronism	FCxS
New Alternative; Nueva Alternativa	—N/a		FCxS
People's Party; Partido Popular	PP	Peronism	—N/a
Centrist Social Party; Partido Social de Centro	—N/a		FCxS

==== Tierra del Fuego ====
Political party		Ideology	Affiliation
People's Encounter; Encuentro Popular	EP	Peronism	FdT
Environment and Development Front; Frente Ambiente y Desarrollo	FAD	Environmentalism	FdT
HACER Front for Social Progress; Frente HACER por el Progreso Social	HACER PPS	Peronism	FdT
Initiative for Unity; Iniciativa por la Unión	IXU	Progressivism	—N/a
Fueguian People's Movement; Movimiento Popular Fueguino	MOPOF	Regionalism	FdT
New Country; Nuevo País	NP	Peronism	FdT
Patagonian Social Party; Partido Social Patagónico	PSP	Progressivism	FdT
We Are Fueguian; Somos Fueguinos	SF	Regionalism	—N/a

==== Tucumán ====
Political party		Ideology	Affiliation
Path to Loyalty; Camino a la Lealtad	PCL	Peronism	FdT
Bonaerense Current of Thought; Corriente de Pensamiento Bonaerense	COPEBO	Peronism	FdT
Republican Force; Fuerza Republicana	FR	Social conservatism	—N/a
United People's Front; Frente del Pueblo Unido	PU	Kirchnerism	FdT
People's Left / Dignity People's Movement; Izquierda Popular / Movimiento Popular La Dignidad	IP	Socialism	FdT
Civic Participation Movement; Movimiento de Participación Ciudadana	TyH	Social conservatism	FC
Independent Movement of Justice and Dignity; Movimiento Independiente de Justicia y Dignidad	MIDJ	Socialism	—N/a
Federal Accord Party; Partido Acuerdo Federal	AF	Peronism	FdT
Party for Social Justice; Partido por la Justicia Social	PJS	Peronism	JxC
Innovative Tucumán Party; Partido Tucumán Innovador	PIT	Peronism	—N/a
Tucumán Moves Forward; Tucumán Avanza	TA	Peronism	FdT

== Defunct parties and alliances ==
19th Century and early 20th Century

- Unitarian Party (Partido Unitario)
- Federalist Party (Partido Federal)
- National Autonomist Party (Partido Autonomista Nacional, PAN)
- Civic Union of the Youth (Unión Cívica de la Juventud, UCJ)
- Civic Union (Unión Cívica)
- National Civic Union (Unión Cívica Nacional, UCN)
- National Autonomist Party (Modernist) (Partido Autonomista Nacional, línea modernista)
- Lencinism (Mendoza) (Lencinismo)
- Antipersonalist Radical Civic Union (Unión Cívica Radical Antipersonalista, UCR-A)
- Rightist Confederation (Confederación Derechista)
- Independent Socialist Party (Partido Socialista Independiente, PSI)
- National Democratic Party (Partido Democrático Nacional, PDN)
- Concordancia

Mid 20th Century

- Democratic Union (Unión Democrática, UD)
- Radical Civic Union (Junta Renovadora) (Unión Cívica Radical, Junta Renovadora)
- Independent Party (Partido Independiente)
- Labour Party (Partido Laborista, PL)
- Peronist Party (Partido Peronista, PP)
- Female Peronist Party (Partido Peronista Femenino)
- Intransigent Radical Civic Union (Unión Cívica Radical Intransigente, UCRI)
- Radical Civic Union of the People (Unión Cívica Radical del Pueblo, UCRP)
- Democratic Socialist Party (Partido Democrático Socialista, PSD)
- Argentine Socialist Party (1915) (Partido Socialista Argentino, PSA)
- Argentine Socialist Party (1958) (Partido Socialista Argentino, PSA)
- Revolutionary and Popular Indoamericano Front (Frente Revolucionario Indoamericano Popular, FRIP
- Union of the Argentine People (Unión del Pueblo Argentino, UDELPA)
- Argentine Socialist Vanguard Party (Partido Socialista Argentino de Vanguardia, PSAV)
- Socialist Party of the National Left (Partido Socialista de la Izquierda Nacional, PSIN)
- Popular Socialist Party (Partido Socialista Popular, PSP)
- Worker's Socialist Party (Partido Socialista de los Trabajadores, PST)
- Federalist Popular Alliance (Alianza Popular Federalista, APF)
- Revolutionary Popular Alliance (Alianza Popular Revolucionaria, APR)
- Justicialist Front for National Liberation (Frente Justicialista de Liberación Nacional, FREJULI)
- Autonomist Party of Corrientes

Late 20th Century and early 21st Century

- Federalist Popular Force (Fuerza Federalista Popular, FuFePo)
- Autonomist-Liberal Pact (Pacto Autonomista-Liberal, Corrientes Province)
- Alliance for Work, Justice and Education (Alianza por el Trabajo, la Justicia y la Educación, ALIANZA)
- Front for a Country in Solidarity (Frente para un País Solidario, Frepaso)
- Argentines for a Republic of Equals (Argentinos por una República de Iguales, ARI)
- United Left (Izquierda Unida, IU)
- People's Reconstruction Party
- Front for Change (Frente para el Cambio)
- Broad Encounter (Encuentro Amplio)
- An Advanced Nation (UNA) (una Nación Avanzada, UNA)
- Everyone's Front (Frente de Todos, FdT)
- Federal Consensus (Consenso Federal, CF)
- Argentine National Socialist Front (Frente Nacional Socialista Argentino, FNSA)

== See also ==
- Politics of Argentina
- List of political parties by country
