= Vamos con Vos =

Let's go with You Vamos con Vos
- Abbreviation: VcV
- Leader: Florencio Randazzo
- Founded: 14 July 2021
- Preceded by: Justicialist Front Cumplir
- Headquarters: Buenos Aires
- Ideology: Federal Peronism; Vecinalism; Social democracy Left-wing nationalism Third Way
- Political position: Centre
- National affiliation: Federal Interblock
- Coalition members: H.A.C.E.R. Front, Socialist Party, Freemen of the South, Third Position Party
- Colours: Green
- Slogan: #HayOtroCamino (English: There is another way)
- Senate: 0 / 72
- Chamber of Deputies: 3 / 257

Website
- vamosconvos.ar

The Vamos con Vos (lit. 'Let's go with You', VcV) is an Argentine political coalition founded in 2021 that competed in the legislative election in the provinces of Buenos Aires, Chaco, Corrientes, La Pampa y Santiago del Estero.

In the province of Buenos Aires, it was made up of the following parties: Frente H.A.C.E.R. for Social Progress, Third Position Party and Freemen of the South Movement. In Chaco and Corrientes, the coalition was made up of Freemen of the South and the Socialist Party.

== National deputies ==
The three national deputies are part of the Identidad Bonaerense block, which in turn is part of the Federal Consensus Interblock.

Block Identidad Bonaerense President: Alejandro «Topo» Rodríguez
Image	Name	Province	Mandate	
Image	Name	Province	From	To
	Alejandro Rodrígues	Buenos Aires	2019	2023
	Florencio Randazzo	Buenos Aires	2021	2025
	Graciela Camaño	Buenos Aires	2019	2023

== Constituent parties in the 2021 elections ==
Party	Leader	Ideology	Position
Do for Social Progress (in Buenos Aires)	Florencio Randazzo	Federal Peronism	Centre
Socialist Party (in Chaco, Corrientes y La Pampa)	Mónica Fein	Social democracy Democratic socialism	Centre-left
Freemen of the South Movement (in Buenos Aires, Chaco, Corrientes y Santiago del Estero)	Humberto Tumini	Left-wing nationalism Social democracy	Centre-left
Third Position Party (in Buenos Aires)	Graciela Camaño	Federal Peronism	Centre-right

== See also ==
- Peronism
- Federal Peronism
- Federal Consensus
