= Salta Identity Party =

Argentine political party

Salta Identity Party Partido Identidad Salteña
- Leader: Gustavo Sáenz
- President: Benjamín Cruz
- Founded: 2015; 11 years ago
- Membership (2017): ▲4,068
- Ideology: Peronism; Regionalism; Federal Peronism
- Political position: Center-right
- Colors: Maroon
- Argentine Chamber of Deputies (Salta seats): 0 / 7
- Argentine Senate (Salta seats): 1 / 3
- Seats in the Salta Senate: 12 / 23
- Seats in the Salta Chamber of Deputies: 16 / 37

Election symbol
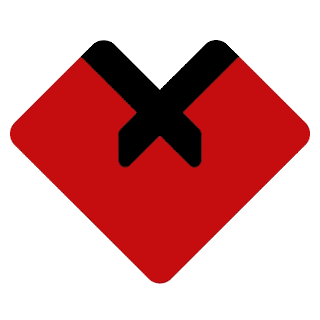

The Salta Identity Party (Spanish: Partido Identidad Salteña; PAIS) is a provincial political party in the Salta Province of Argentina. It was founded by Gustavo Sáenz ahead of the 2015 general election; Sáenz has been governor of Salta since 2019.

The party was a member of the United for a New Alternative alliance until 2017, when it aligned itself with Cambiemos. It supported Roberto Lavagna and former Salta governor Juan Manuel Urtubey's 2019 unsuccessful presidential run; since then it has distanced itself from any national alliances. The party has representation – but no majorities – in both houses of the Salta provincial legislature. It has representation at the federal level, with Flavia Royón serving as national senator for Salta since 2025.

Its logo, adopted ahead of the 2019 gubernatorial elections, is a stylized poncho salteño. The party's use of the traditional poncho led to a legal dispute with an ally party, Salta Unites Us (SNU), that also used a stylized poncho as part of its image. The dispute was settled by the province's Electoral Tribunal, which sentenced in favor of PAIS and ruled both parties could freely use the poncho as their logo.

== Electoral results ==
=== Chamber of Deputies ===
Election year	Votes	%	seats won	total seats	position	presidency	notes
2015	184,185	28.09 (#2nd)	0	0 / 7	Extra-parliamentary	Mauricio Macri (PRO—Cambiemos)	within UNA
2017	211,377	30.25 (#1st)	0	0 / 7	Extra-parliamentary	Mauricio Macri (PRO—Cambiemos)	within Cambiemos
2019	83,633	11.87 (#3rd)	0	0 / 7	Extra-parliamentary	Alberto Fernández (PJ—FDT)	within Union for Salta

=== Senate ===
Election year	Votes	%	seats won	total seats	position	presidency	notes
2019	85,601	12.06 (#3rd)	0	0 / 3	Extra-parliamentary	Alberto Fernández (PJ—FDT)	within Union for Salta

=== Salta governorship ===
Election year	Candidate	Coalition	# of overall votes	% of overall vote	Result
2015	Juan Carlos Romero	Romero + Olmedo Front	203,417	30,63 (2nd)	✗ Defeated
2019	Gustavo Sáenz	Sáenz Gobernador Front	377,389	53.65 (1st)	✓ Elected
