= Alejandro Rodríguez (politician) =

Argentine politician (born 1965)

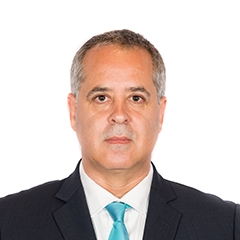

National Deputy
- In office 10 December 2019 – 10 December 2023
- Constituency: Buenos Aires

Minister of Agrarian Affairs of Buenos Aires Province
- In office 26 December 2013 – 10 December 2015
- Governor: Daniel Scioli
- Preceded by: Gustavo Arrieta
- Succeeded by: Leonardo Sarquis

Personal details
- Born: 27 December 1965 (age 60) Tandil, Argentina
- Party: Justicialist Party
- Other political affiliations: Front for Victory (2003–2015); Federal Consensus (2019–2023)

Alejandro Esteban "Topo" Rodríguez (born 27 December 1965) is an Argentine politician, who served as National Deputy representing Buenos Aires Province from 2019 to 2023. A member of the Justicialist Party, Rodríguez was elected in 2019 for the Federal Consensus coalition. He previously served as Minister of Agrarian Affairs of Buenos Aires Province in the administration of Governor Daniel Scioli.

== Early life and education ==
Rodríguez was born on 27 December 1965 in Tandil. He studied political science at the Universidad del Salvador, graduating in 1990, and has a master's degree in Administration and Public Policy from the University of Chile. Rodríguez is married and has one daughter, born in 2002.

Rodríguez has taught at the University of Buenos Aires, the National University of La Plata, the Pontifical Catholic University of Argentina, and the Favaloro University.

== Political career ==
Rodríguez was appointed Undersecretary of Government of Buenos Aires Province in 2009. In 2011, he was appointed Undersecretary of Governmental Coordination at the Cabinet Chief's Office of the Province, a position he held until 2013. On 26 December 2013, he was appointed Minister of Agrarian Affairs of the province, succeeding Gustavo Arrieta. As minister, Rodríguez decreed the mandatory vaccination of cattle against anthrax. During the latter part of his administration, Rodríguez was critical of the agrarian policies of Axel Kicillof, then Economy Minister of Argentina.

Following the election of María Eugenia Vidal as Governor of Buenos Aires in 2015, Rodríguez became Cabinet Chief of La Matanza Partido, under intendenta Verónica Magario.

=== National Deputy ===
Rodríguez ran for a seat in the Argentine Chamber of Deputies in the 2019 legislative election, as the second candidate in the Federal Consensus list, behind Graciela Camaño. The list received 6.01% of the votes, just enough for Camaño and Rodríguez to be elected.

As deputy, Rodríguez formed part of the parliamentary commissions on Industry, Commerce, Maritime interests, and Transport. He was an opponent of the legalization of abortion in Argentina, voting against the 2020 Voluntary Interruption of Pregnancy bill that passed the Chamber. In 2021, he was elected president of the Federal Consensus parliamentary bloc following the defection of Eduardo Bucca to the Frente de Todos bloc.
