= 2019 Buenos Aires provincial election =

- 27 October 2019
- Turnout: 10,548,393 (80.00%) ▼0.48 pp
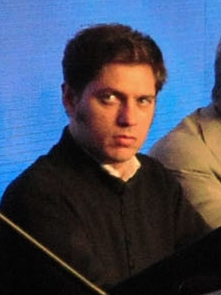

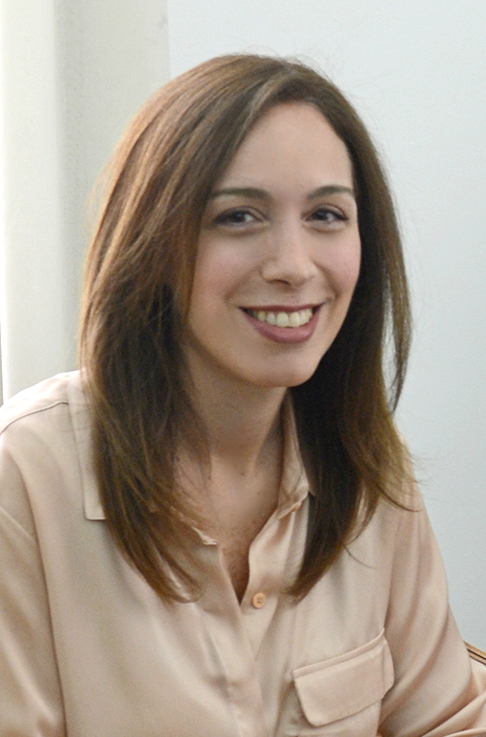

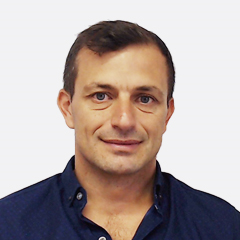

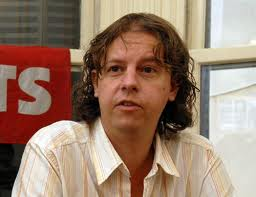

Candidate	Axel Kicillof	María Eugenia Vidal	Eduardo Bucca
Party	Frente de Todos	Juntos por el Cambio	CF
Popular vote	5,274,511	3,852,624	513,850
Percentage	52.40%	38.28%	5.11%
Candidate	Christian Castillo	Gustavo Ricardo Álvarez
Party	Workers' Left Front–Unity	NOS Front
Popular vote	282,830	141,249
Percentage	2.81%	1.40%
- Map showing the seats won by each party in each partido.
Governor before election
María Eugenia Vidal
PRO–Cambiemos
Elected Governor
Axel Kicillof
FdT

General elections were held in Buenos Aires Province on 27 October 2019, alongside national elections. The governor and vice governor, as well as half of the Chamber of Deputies and a half of the Senate were renewed. In addition, a number of municipal offices were elected as well.

The candidatures were defined in the open, simultaneous, and mandatory primaries (PASO), which took place on 11 August 2019. Lists that won at least 1.5% of the votes (including blanks) qualified to the general election.

The election resulted in the defeat of incumbent governor María Eugenia Vidal (PRO) to former finance minister and then-congressman Axel Kicillof, of the Frente de Todos (FDT). This accompanied the national trend, in which incumbent president Mauricio Macri, of PRO, lost to the FDT's Alberto Fernández. Vidal is the first governor in the province's history to seek re-election and lose, while Kicillof became the eighth governor (sixth peronist) since the return of democracy in 1983. It was the most polarized election since 1999, with the two most voted candidates summing 90.68% of the votes.

== Results ==
=== Primaries ===
Party	Candidate	Running mate	Votes	%
Frente de Todos	Axel Kicillof	Verónica Magario	4,921,536	49.44
Juntos por el Cambio	María Eugenia Vidal	Daniel Salvador	3,223,460	32.38
Federal Consensus	Eduardo Bucca	Miguel Saredi	575,202	5.78
Workers' Left Front – Unity	Christian Castillo	Mercedes Trimachi	321,876	3.23
NOS Front	Gustavo R. Álvarez	Sandra M. Dell'Aquila	168,223	1.69
Movement of Socialist Advance	Martín González Bayón	Marina Alonso	67,319	0.68
Patriotic Front	Leonardo Bariani	Ana Graziano	21,434	0.22
Popular Dignity Party	Santiago Cuneo	Claudio Morgado	21,491	0.22
Democratic Organization Movement	María Macaione	Marcelo Ferrara	11,104	0.11
Blank votes			623,049	6.26
Invalid votes			66,813	–
Total			10,021,507	100
Registered voters/turnout			13,185,036	76.35
Source: Poder Judicial de la Nación

=== Governor and Vice Governor ===
Candidate	Running mate	Party	Votes	%
Axel Kicillof	Verónica Magario	Everyone's Front	5,274,511	52.40
María Eugenia Vidal	Daniel Salvador	Together for Change	3,852,624	38.28
Eduardo Bucca	Miguel Saredi	Federal Consensus	513,850	5.11
Christian Castillo	Mercedes Trimarchi	Left and Worker's Front-Unity	282,830	2.81
Gustavo Ricardo Álvarez	Sandra María Dell'Aquila	NOS Front	141,249	1.40
Total			10,065,064	100.00
Valid votes			10,065,064	95.42
Invalid votes			64,237	0.61
Blank votes			419,092	3.97
Total votes			10,548,393	100.00
Registered voters/turnout			13,185,036	80.00

=== Chamber of Deputies ===
Party	Votes	%	Seats	
Party	Votes	%	Won	Total
Everyone's Front	2,475,108	49.36	23	45
Together for Change	2,036,188	40.61	22	40
Federal Consensus	274,213	5.47	1	6
Left and Worker's Front-Unity	159,833	3.19	0	1
NOS Front	69,059	1.38	0	0
Total	5,014,401	100.00	46	92
Valid votes	5,014,401	94.24		
Invalid votes	33,513	0.63		
Blank votes	272,720	5.13		
Total votes	5,320,634	100.00		
Registered voters/turnout	6,647,397	80.04		

=== Senate ===
Party	Votes	%	Seats	
Party	Votes	%	Won	Total
Everyone's Front	2,717,387	55.06	13	20
Together for Change	1,711,369	34.67	10	26
Federal Consensus	261,365	5.30	0	0
Left and Worker's Front-Unity	170,616	3.46	0	0
NOS Front	75,009	1.52	0	0
Total	4,935,746	100.00	23	46
Valid votes	4,935,746	94.41		
Invalid votes	29,892	0.57		
Blank votes	262,121	5.01		
Total votes	5,227,759	100.00		
Registered voters/turnout	6,537,639	79.96		

== See also ==
- 2019 Argentine general election
- 2019 Argentine provincial elections
- 2019 Buenos Aires City elections
