= Emilio Monzó =

Argentinian lawyer and politician

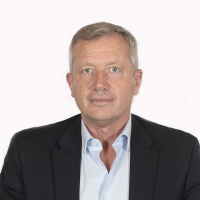
- Monzó in 2021

National Deputy
- Incumbent
- Assumed office 10 December 2021
- Constituency: Buenos Aires
- In office 10 December 2015 – 10 December 2019
- Constituency: Buenos Aires

President of the Chamber of Deputies
- In office 10 December 2015 – 10 December 2019
- Preceded by: Julián Domínguez
- Succeeded by: Sergio Massa

Provincial Deputy of Buenos Aires
- In office 2 September 2009 – 10 December 2011
- Constituency: Fourth Electoral Section
- In office 10 December 2007 – 27 October 2008
- Constituency: Fourth Electoral Section

Mayor of Carlos Tejedor
- In office 10 December 2003 – 30 September 2009
- Preceded by: Carlos Rivas
- Succeeded by: María Celia Gianini

Personal details
- Born: September 26, 1965 (age 61) Carlos Tejedor, Buenos Aires Province, Argentina
- Party: UCeDé (1980s); Justicialist Party (1980s–2010); Republican Proposal (2010–2015); Dialogue Party (2015–present)
- Other political affiliations: Juntos por el Cambio (2015–present)
- Education: University of Buenos Aires
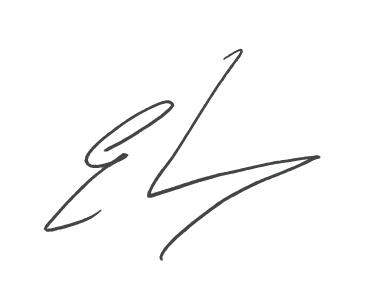
- Signature

Emilio Monzó (born 26 September 1965) is an Argentine lawyer and politician who served as President of the Argentine Chamber of Deputies from 2015 to 2019. In 2015, he founded the Dialogue Party, which is affiliated with Republican Proposal (PRO) and forms part of the Juntos por el Cambio coalition.

He was born in Carlos Tejedor, Buenos Aires Province and studied law at the University of Buenos Aires.

He began his political activism in the 1980s in the Union of the Democratic Center, later switching to the Justicialist Party. In 2011 he joined Republican Proposal and worked at the successful 2015 presidential campaign of Mauricio Macri.

He was intendente (mayor) of his birthplace between 2003 and 2007 after serving in the City Council. He served as Minister of Rural Affairs in the provincial government of Daniel Scioli, and later became Mauricio Macri's Chief of Staff in the Buenos Aires City government.

Political offices
Preceded by Carlos Rivas	Mayor of Carlos Tejedor; 2003–2009	Succeeded by María Celia Gianini
Preceded by Julián Domínguez	President of the Chamber of Deputies; 2015–2019	Succeeded by Sergio Massa
