= Light Blue and White Union =

Argentine political party

Light Blue and White Union Unión Celeste y Blanco
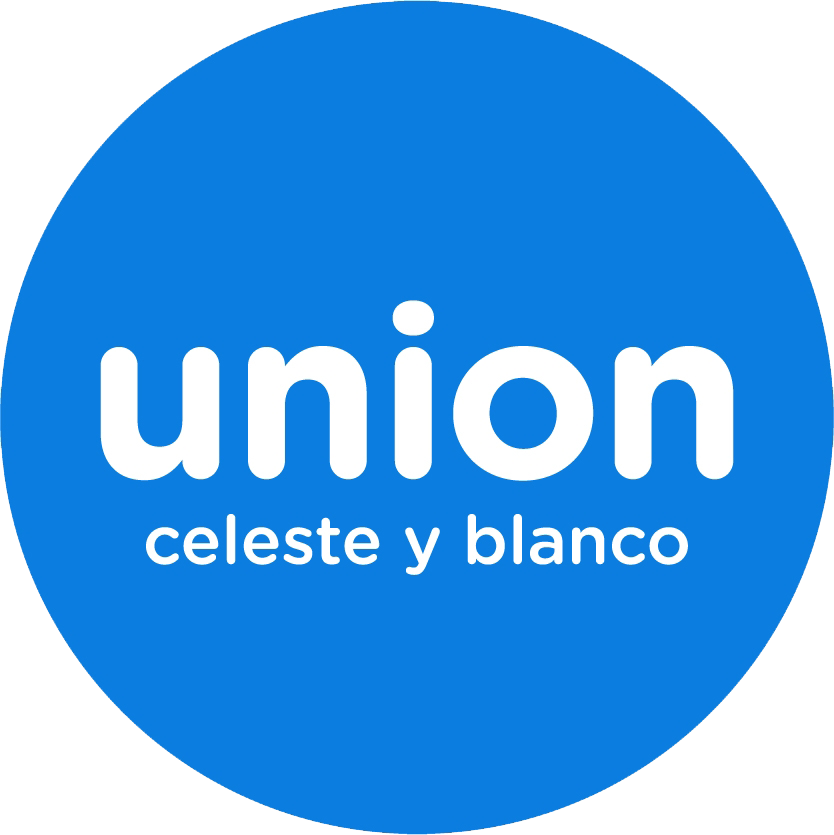
- Leader: Francisco de Narváez
- Founded: 2007; 19 years ago
- Membership (2017): ▲20,062
- Ideology: Federal Peronism
- Political position: Centre-right to right-wing
- Colors: Light blue, white, red
- Seats in the Chamber of Deputies: 0 / 257
- Seats in the Senate: 0 / 72

The Light Blue and White Union (Spanish: Unión Celeste y Blanco; UCyB) is a minor centre-right political party in Argentina. It was founded in 2007 by Argentine-Colombian businessman and former national deputy Francisco de Narváez. The party stands for economic liberalism and Federal Peronism. The party's name is a reference to the Argentine national colours.

The party now forms part of Federal Consensus and has no representation at the federal level.

== History ==
The Light Blue and White Union was formed in 2007 by Francisco de Narváez, then a national deputy for the Justicialist Party. Upon its formation it became part of the PRO Union, which was then an electoral coalition (it would later become a political party in its own right). By 2011, de Narváez and UCyB had broken the alliance with the PRO Union and instead formed UDESO with the Radical Civic Union and the Federal Party to back de Narváez's unsuccessful candidacy for the governorship of Buenos Aires Province.

Ahead of the 2013 legislative election, the party formed an alliance with the Federal Party, the Integration and Development Movement and the Party of Culture, Education and Labour named "United for Liberty and Labour" (Spanish: Unidos por la Libertad y el Trabajo), which only managed to elect 2 deputies to the Chamber of Deputies in Buenos Aires Province. By 2015, the party had become part of United for a New Alternative.

The party did not field any candidates in the 2017 legislative election and only participated in a few minor provincial alliances in Catamarca (where it was part of Citizen's Unity), Córdoba (Union for Córdoba) and Corrientes (Encounter for Corrientes).

In 2019, the Light Blue and White Union joined other centrist and Federal Peronist parties and formed Federal Consensus to back the presidential candidacy of former economy minister Roberto Lavagna.

== Electoral performance ==
=== President ===
Election year	Candidate	Coalition	1st round	
Election year	Candidate	Coalition	# of overall votes	% of overall vote
2011	Ricardo Alfonsín	UDESO	2,443,016 (3rd)	11.14 (lost)
2015	Sergio Massa	UNA	5,386,965 (3rd)	21.39 (lost)
2019	Roberto Lavagna	Federal Consensus	1,649,315 (3rd)	6.14 (lost)

=== Chamber of Deputies ===
Election year	Votes	%	seats won	total seats	position	presidency	notes
2007	1,023,695	5.67 (#4th)	3	4 / 257	Minority	Cristina Fernández de Kirchner (PJ—FPV)	within PRO Union
2009	3,675,747	19.03 (#3rd)	1	4 / 257	Minority	Cristina Fernández de Kirchner (PJ—FPV)	within PRO Union
2011	4,074,732	18.00 (3rd)	0	1 / 257	Minority	Cristina Fernández de Kirchner (PJ—FPV)	within UDESO
2013	486,753	2.15 (6th)	1	1 / 257	Minority	Cristina Fernández de Kirchner (PJ—FPV)	within ULyT
2015	4,115,414	17.65 (#3rd)	0	0 / 257	Extra-parliamentary	Mauricio Macri (PRO—Cambiemos)	within UNA
2017	—N/a		0	0 / 257	Extra-parliamentary	Mauricio Macri (PRO—Cambiemos)	
2019	1,477,802	5.85 (#3rd)	0	0 / 257	Extra-parliamentary	Alberto Fernández (PJ—FDT)	within CF
