= Encuentro Amplio =

Left-wing electoral front in Argentina

El Encuentro Amplio (English: the Broad Encounter) was a left-wing electoral front in Argentina formed ahead of the 2005 legislative elections.

Based on the Frente Amplio of Uruguay, the alliance was formed of the Intransigent Party, the Socialist Party and the Communist Party of Argentina with sections of the Broad Front and the Front for Change, plus representatives of social organisations such as Apyme. It contested the seats for senator, with Ariel Basteiro as its first candidate, and for Buenos Aires Province and Buenos Aires City deputies in alliance with the Autogestión Liberadora Buenos Aires (ALBA).

The alliance performed badly in the election, gaining less than 1% in the capital and losing all its legislators at a national level.

== See also ==
- Political parties in Argentina
