= Darío Martínez =

Argentine politician (born 1974)

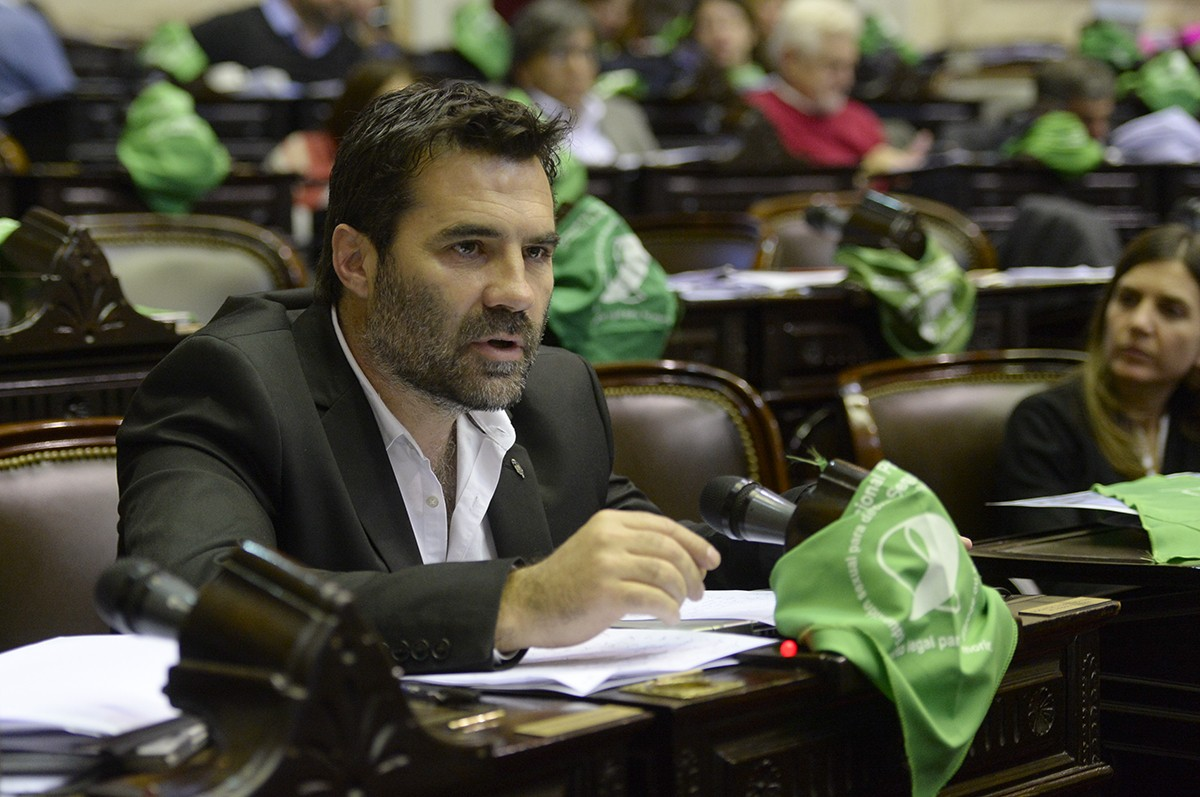

Secretary of Energy
- In office 21 August 2020 – 17 August 2022
- President: Alberto Fernández
- Preceded by: Sergio Lanziani
- Succeeded by: Flavia Royón

National Deputy
- In office 1 March 2016 – 28 August 2020
- Constituency: Neuquén

Personal details
- Born: 3 September 1974 (age 51) Ingeniero Huergo, Argentina
- Party: Justicialist Party
- Other political affiliations: Front for Victory (2003–2017); Unidad Ciudadana (2017–2019); Frente de Todos (2019–present)

Normán Darío Martínez (born 3 September 1974) is an Argentine politician. A member of the Justicialist Party, Martínez served as a National Deputy representing Neuquén Province from 2016 to 2020, and later as Secretary of Energy in the Ministry of Economy, in the administration of minister Martín Guzmán, from 2020 to 2022.

== Early life and education ==
Martínez was born on 3 September 1974 in Ingeniero Luis A. Huergo, a small town in Northern Río Negro Province. He studied public accounting at the National University of Comahue, but dropped out before finishing his degree.

== Political career ==
Martínez was elected to the City Council of Neuquén in 2005, and served continuously until 2013. He unsuccessfully ran for the mayoralty of Neuquén in 2011, landing fourth with 7% of the vote.

In the 2013 legislative election, Martínez ran for a seat in the Argentine Chamber of Deputies as the second candidate in the Front for Victory list, behind Nanci Parrilli. The list received 21.31% of the vote, not enough for Martínez to be elected. Parrilli resigned in 2016, and Martínez assumed office in her stead. He was re-elected in 2017, as the first candidate in the Unidad Ciudadana list, which landed third with 19.36%.

Martínez ran for re-election in the 2019 legislative election as the first candidate in the Frente de Todos list, which was the most voted, with 36.39% of the vote. As he was still a sitting deputy with mandate to 2021, upon taking office on 10 December 2019 he resigned from his 2017–2021 term, and Carlos Alberto Vivero took his seat.

As a national deputy, Martínez was a supporter of the legalization of abortion in Argentina, voting in favour of the 2018 Voluntary Interruption of Pregnancy bill.

In August 2020, Martínez was appointed Secretary of Energy in replacement of Sergio Lanziani. Martínez's seat in the Chamber of Deputies was taken by Guillermo Carnaghi.
