= Flavia Royón =

Argentine politician

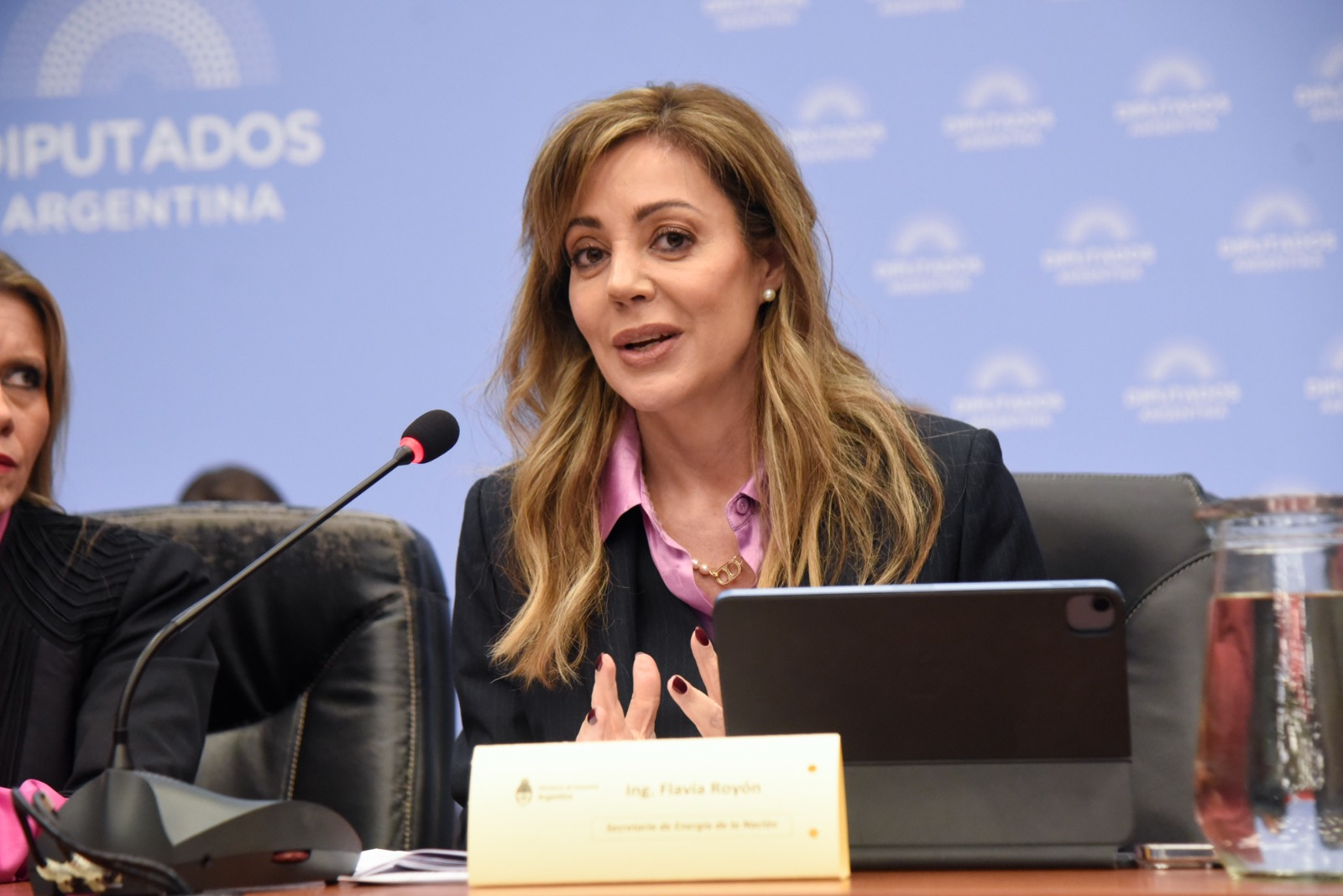

National Senator
- Incumbent
- Assumed office 10 December 2025
- Constituency: Salta

Secretary of Mining
- In office 12 December 2023 – 9 February 2024
- President: Javier Milei
- Preceded by: Fernanda Ávila
- Succeeded by: Luis Enrique Lucero

Secretary of Energy
- In office 17 August 2022 – 10 December 2023
- President: Alberto Fernández
- Preceded by: Darío Martínez
- Succeeded by: Eduardo Rodríguez Chirillo

Personal details
- Born: 31 March 1976 (age 50) Salta, Argentina
- Party: Salta Identity Party
- Other political affiliations: Frente de Todos (2022–2023)
- Education: National University of Salta (BS); Austral University (MBA)

Flavia Gabriela Royón (Spanish pronunciation: [ˈflaβja ɣaˈβɾjela roˈʝon]; born 31 March 1976) is an Argentine industrial engineer and politician. She served as the national secretary of energy from August 2022 to December 2023, during the presidency of Alberto Fernández, under Economy Minister Sergio Massa at the Ministry of Economy. She subsequently served as national Secretary of Mining at the Ministry of Economy from December 2023 to February 2024, during the administration of Javier Milei.

== Early life and education ==
Royón was born on 31 March 1976 in Salta. Royón studied at the National University of Salta, where she earned a degree in industrial engineering.

She obtained a master's degree from the IAE Business School at Austral University. She also completed postgraduate diploma programmes in comprehensive mining management at the Catholic University of Salta and in public policies for economic growth at the Austral University.

== Political career ==
From 2002 to 2017, Royón held several management positions at Frigorífico Bermejo S.A. Between 2010 and 2014, she worked at the Salta Chamber of Foreign Trade. She served as head of the ProSalta Foundation from 2013 to 2014 and again from 2019 to 2020.

On 19 May 2021, Governor of Salta Gustavo Sáenz swore Royón in as the province's secretary of mining and energy. On 17 August 2022, following Sergio Massa's appointment as minister of economy, Royón was appointed national secretary of energy. During her tenure, the first stage of the President Néstor Kirchner Gas Pipeline was constructed. She submitted her resignation upon the change of government on 10 December 2023.

On 12 December 2023, President Javier Milei appointed Royón as Secretary of Mining. On 9 February 2024, amid a dispute between Milei and provincial governors following the failure of the Law of Bases to pass in the Chamber of Deputies, the president requested her resignation because of her political ties to the governor of Salta, Gustavo Sáenz.

In the 2025 legislative election, Royón ran for one of Salta's seats in the Argentine Senate. She ran in the Salta Identity Party list (named "Salteños First") and came second, with 28.21% of the votes, winning the seat for the minority. She assumed office on 10 December 2025.

== Electoral history ==
Electoral history of Flavia Royón
| Election | Office | List | # | District | Votes | | | Result | Ref. |
| Election | Office | List | # | District | Total | % | P. | Result | Ref. |
|---|---|---|---|---|---|---|---|---|---|
| 2025 | National Senator | Salteños First | 1 | Salta Province | 194,619 | 28.21% | 2nd (Note: Presented on an electoral list. The data shown represents the share of the vote the entire party/alliance received in that constituency.) | Elected | |
