= Pablo Javkin =

Argentine politician

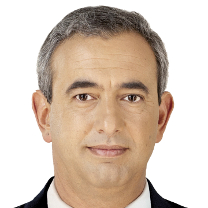

Mayor of Rosario
- Incumbent
- Assumed office 10 December 2019
- Preceded by: Mónica Fein

National Deputy
- In office 10 December 2013 – 10 December 2015
- Constituency: Santa Fe

Provincial Deputy of Santa Fe
- In office 10 December 2007 – 10 December 2011

Personal details
- Born: 19 November 1971 (age 54) Rosario, Santa Fe, Argentina
- Party: Radical Civic Union (until 2002); Civic Coalition ARI (2002–2018); Creo (since 2018)
- Other political affiliations: Progressive, Civic and Social Front (2006–2023)
- Education: National University of Rosario

Pablo Lautaro Javkin (born 19 November 1971) is an Argentine lawyer and politician who has served as intendente (mayor) of Rosario since 2019. A former member of the Radical Civic Union (UCR), Javkin spent most of his political career in the Civic Coalition ARI before founding his own local party, Creo, and winning the mayorship in 2019.

Javkin served as a National Deputy from 2013 to 2015. He has also served as a member of the Provincial Chamber of Deputies, as a city councilman in Rosario and as a member of the city's municipal government.

During his term as mayor of Rosario, the city has faced escalating drug-related violence, with homicides peaking at 288 in 2022 before declining to 90 in 2024 after federal and provincial security interventions. Re-elected in 2023 with 51.74% of the vote, his administration launched Rosario’s tricentennial urban renewal plan in 2025.

== Early life and career ==
Javkin was born on 19 November 1971 in Rosario, Santa Fe to Eduardo Javkin and Mirta Guelman. His involvement in politics started early in his youth, and he was president of the students' union at his high school, Escuela Superior de Comercio. He later studied law at the National University of Rosario (UNR).

His political activism continued throughout his university years, as he joined the student wing of the Radical Civic Union, Franja Morada. As a member of Franja Morada he became president of the students' union at the UNR Faculty of Law in 1993. In 1994 he was elected president of the Rosario University Federation, and later, in 1998, he became president of the Argentine University Federation.

== Political career ==
In 2001 he was elected to the Rosario City Council on the Alliance list alongside Mónica Fein. In 2002 he joined other members of the UCR in breaking away from the party to form the ARI party, led by Elisa Carrió. r

In 2007, he was elected to the Legislature of Santa Fe's lower house as part of the newly formed Progressive, Civic and Social Front, an alliance of progressive and social democratic parties. He promoted several bills including an electoral reform that remains in use in Santa Fe Province to date.

From 2008 to 2010 he was president of the Santa Fe chapter of the Civic Coalition ARI, and in 2012 he became president of the party nationwide, a position he held until 2016 when he was replaced by Maricel Etchecoin.

He was elected to the Argentine Chamber of Deputies in the 2013 election as part of the Progressive, Civic and Social Front list; he was the fourth candidate. From 2015 to 2017 he was Secretary General of the Municipality of Rosario under mayor Mónica Fein. In 2017 he was once again elected to City Council.

In 2018 he launched his own political party, CREO (Spanish for "I believe"), announcing his intention to run for mayor of Rosario in the 2019 election.

=== Mayor of Rosario ===
Javkin was elected mayor of Rosario in 2019, defeating Peronist candidate Roberto Sukerman by 34.50% to 33%. During his term, the city experienced rising drug-trafficking-related violence, with homicides reaching a rate of 21.8 per 100,000 inhabitants (triple the national average) and peaking at 288 killings in 2022, the highest recorded.

In the 2023 PASO primaries, Javkin, backed by Senator Carolina Losada, defeated Miguel Ángel Tessandori (supported by then-provincial deputy Maximiliano Pullaro) 42.37% to 34.68%. He later won the general election with 51.74% of the vote (241,728 votes) against councilman Juan Monteverde of Juntos Avancemos (48.26%, 225,500 votes).

That year, drug cartels targeted public institutions, including a union, a TV station, a criminal investigations agency, a police station, and a health center. In response, the provincial and national governments launched Plan Bandera, deploying additional security forces. Homicides dropped to 90 in 2024, a feat that can partially be attributed to the Plan Bandera initiative among other factors.

In February 2025, Javkin unveiled a public works master plan for Rosario’s tricentennial, including restorations of landmarks like the Cathedral, Palacio de Leones, Plaza 25 de Mayo, and pedestrian streets. That June, he proposed a bill to allow buildings up to 120 meters tall.

== Personal life ==
Javkin is Jewish. Sports-wise he is a supporter of Newell's Old Boys.

In 2022 he revealed he was ongoing treatment for prostate cancer.

== Electoral history ==
=== Executive ===
Electoral history of Pablo Javkin
Election	Office	List	Votes			Result	Ref.
Election	Office	List	Total	%	P.	Result	Ref.
2019	Mayor of Rosario	Progressive, Civic and Social Front	181,661	34.46%	1st	Elected	
2023	Mayor of Rosario	United to Change Santa Fe	301,799	46.02%	1st	Elected	

=== Legislative ===
Electoral history of Pablo Javkin
Election	Office	List	#	District	Votes			Result	Ref.
Election	Office	List	#	District	Total	%	P.	Result	Ref.
2001	Councillor	Santa Fe Alliance	2	Rosario	100,384	24.98%	2nd (Note: Presented on an electoral list. The data shown represents the share of the vote the entire party/alliance received in that constituency.)	Elected	
2007	Provincial Deputy	Progressive, Civic and Social Front	21	Santa Fe Province	790,927	50.30%	1st	Elected	
2013	National Deputy	Progressive, Civic and Social Front	4	Santa Fe Province	803,485	42.31%	1st	Elected	
2017	Councillor	Progressive, Civic and Social Front	1	Rosario	91,307	15.67%	3rd	Elected	

Party political offices
Preceded by Adrián Pérez	President of the Civic Coalition ARI; 2012–2016	Succeeded by Maricel Etchecoin
Political offices
Preceded by Mónica Fein	Mayor of Rosario; 2019–present	Incumbent
