= Dialogue Party =

Argentine political party

Dialogue Party Partido del Diálogo
- Leader: Emilio Monzó
- President: Carlos Paredero
- Founded: 2015; 11 years ago
- Headquarters: Calle 8 1007, La Plata
- Youth wing: Jóvenes con Emilio
- Membership (2020): ▼4,867
- Ideology: Federal Peronism; Peronism
- Political position: Centre
- National affiliation: Juntos por el Cambio
- Colors: Magenta
- Seats in the Chamber of Deputies: 1 / 257
- Seats in the Senate: 0 / 72

The Dialogue Party (Spanish: Partido del Diálogo) is a political party in Argentina founded in 2015 by Emilio Monzó, as a split from Republican Proposal (PRO). The party now forms part of the Juntos por el Cambio coalition, alongside PRO. It is presently a provincial party, as it is only registered in Buenos Aires Province.

The party currently has minor representation in the Argentine Chamber of Deputies, as Monzó was elected as a representative in the 2021 legislative election.
