= Hacemos por Nuestro País =

Argentine political coalition

We Act for Our Country Hacemos por Nuestro País
- Abbreviation: HpNP; HNP
- Leader: Juan Schiaretti
- Founders: Juan Schiaretti; Juan Manuel Urtubey
- Founded: 14 June 2023
- Dissolved: 6 August 2025
- Preceded by: Federal Consensus
- Succeeded by: United Provinces
- Ideology: Federal Peronism; Federalism; Anti-Kirchnerism; Argentine nationalism; Third Way
- Political position: Centre to centre-right
- Member parties (national level): Christian Democratic Party; Socialist Party; Autonomist Party
- Parliamentary group: Hacemos Federal Coalition (HCF)

Hacemos por Nuestro País (HpNP or HNP, lit. 'We Act for Our Country') was an Argentine political coalition created to participate in the 2023 Argentine general election. The coalition included Non-Kirchnerist Peronism, the Socialist Party, the Christian Democratic Party, the Autonomist Party and other provincial parties.

The legislative forces of the Federal Interbloc were grouped into this alliance.

== History ==
At the beginning of 2023, the construction of this "third way" coalition, the successor to the Federal Consensus coalition that participated in the 2019 general election, began to be built. Pan-Peronism or Federal Peronism was integrated into this coalition, with its main representatives Juan Schiaretti and Juan Manuel Urtubey, both tentative candidates for the presidency, later adding figures such as socialism, referred to by national deputy Mónica Fein and other parties such as Christian Democrat and National Autonomist, in addition to other provincial forces.

At the beginning of June 2023, the preliminary name of this coalition was revealed: "Hacemos por Nuestro País".

Faced with the decision of Juan Schiaretti together with Florencio Randazzo, Diego Bossio, Christian democracy and socialism to seek to form an expanded alliance with Juntos por el Cambio, Juan Manuel Urtubey notified the exit of the coalition and later announced the withdrawal of his presidential candidacy.

Finally, this agreement could not materialize; on 14 June 2023, the coalition Hacemos por Nuestro País was registered in court.

Hacemos por Nuestro País participated in the 2025 Buenos Aires provincial election as part of the Somos Buenos Aires and 2 senators and 2 deputies were elected as well as presenting a new generation of political candidates (the "sub 40") such as Agustín Boeri in Esteban Echeverría (Third Section)
