= Eduardo Bucca =

Argentine politician (born 1979)

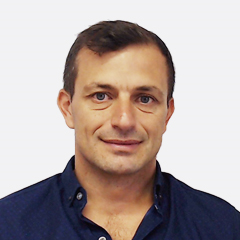

Provincial Senator of Buenos Aires
- Incumbent
- Assumed office 10 December 2021
- Constituency: Seventh Electoral Section

National Deputy
- In office 10 December 2017 – 10 December 2021
- Constituency: Buenos Aires

Mayor of Bolívar
- In office 10 December 2011 – 10 December 2017
- Preceded by: José Gabriel Erreca
- Succeeded by: Marcos Pisano

Personal details
- Born: 23 June 1979 (age 47) San Carlos de Bolívar, Argentina
- Party: Justicialist Party
- Other political affiliations: Front for Victory (2011–2017); Cumplir Justicialist Front (2017); Federal Consensus (2019–2021); Frente de Todos (2021–present)
- Profession: Physician, politician

Eduardo "Bali" Bucca (born 23 June 1979) is an Argentine physician and politician of the Justicialist Party. He served as a National Deputy from 2017 to 2021, elected in Buenos Aires Province, and as intendente (mayor) of Bolívar, Buenos Aires from 2011 to 2017. Since 2021, he has been a member of the Buenos Aires Province Senate elected in the Seventh Electoral Section.

At the 2019 provincial elections, Bucca ran for the governorship of Buenos Aires in the Federal Consensus ticket, winding up in third place with 5.11% of the vote.

== Early and personal life ==
Bucca was born on 23 June 1979 in San Carlos de Bolívar, Buenos Aires Province. He went to school at Colegio Cervantes and finished high school at the Colegio Nacional de Buenos Aires; he would later go on to attain a degree in medicine from Fundación Barceló, in 2002.

Bucca is married and has three children. He is a close friend of TV presenter and businessman Marcelo Tinelli, a fellow native of San Carlos de Bolívar.

== Political career ==
Bucca successfully ran for a seat in the San Carlos de Bolívar city council in 2009. In 2011, he was elected intendente (mayor) of the city with 48% of the votes, and in 2015 he was re-elected with 54% of the votes.

At the 2019 provincial elections, Bucca ran for the governorship of Buenos Aires as part of Federal Consensus, a coalition of dissident Peronists who did not join the Frente de Todos, as well as other smaller parties. Bucca ended up in third place with 5.11% of the vote.

=== National Deputy ===
Bucca ran for a seat in the Argentine Chamber of Deputies at the 2017 legislative election as the first candidate in the Cumplir Justicialist Front list; the list received 5.20% of the vote, and Bucca was the only candidate in the list to be elected.

From 2019 to 2021, Bucca was president of the Federal Consensus parliamentary bloc in the Chamber of Deputies. In August 2021, Bucca left the bloc and officially joined the governing Frente de Todos.

He did not run for a second term as deputy in 2021, and his term expired on 9 December 2021.

== Electoral history ==
=== Executive ===
Electoral history of Eduardo Bucca
| Election | Office | List | Votes | | | Result | Ref. |
| Election | Office | List | Total | % | P. | Result | Ref. |
|---|---|---|---|---|---|---|---|
| 2011 | Mayor of Bolívar | Front for Victory | 10,784 | 47.98% | 1st | Elected | |
| 2015 | Mayor of Bolívar | Front for Victory | 12,453 | 54.60% | 1st | Elected | |
| 2019 | Governor of Buenos Aires | Federal Commitment | 513,850 | 5.11% | 3rd | Not elected | |

=== Legislative ===
Electoral history of Eduardo Bucca
| Election | Office | List | # | District | Votes | | | Result | Ref. |
| Election | Office | List | # | District | Total | % | P. | Result | Ref. |
|---|---|---|---|---|---|---|---|---|---|
| 2017 | National Deputy | Cumplir Justicialist Front | 1 | Buenos Aires Province | 485,138 | 5.20% | 5th (Note: Presented on an electoral list. The data shown represents the share of the vote the entire party/alliance received in that constituency.) | Elected | |
| 2021 | Provincial Senator | Frente de Todos | 1 | Seventh Electoral Section | 62,559 | 33.73% | 2nd | Elected | |
