= Federal Party (Argentina, 1973) =

Federal Party Partido Federal
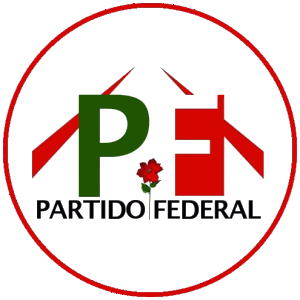
- Founder: Francisco Manrique
- Leader: Miguel Saredi
- Founded: 8 December, 1973
- Headquarters: Buenos Aires, Argentina
- Ideology: Federalism; Federal Peronism
- Political position: Centre-right
- National affiliation: Federal Consensus
- Colors: Red

Website
- http://partidofederal.org/

The Federal Party is an Argentine political party founded by Francisco Manrique in 1973.

It was intended to be the successor party to the military government created by coup d'etat in 1966 and known as the Argentine Revolution (1966–1972) of which its founder was a minister. For the March 1973 Argentine general election, they allied with the Democratic Progressive Party, which contributed the candidate for vice-president Rafael Martinez Raymonda, obtaining a third-place showing with 14.9% of the votes.

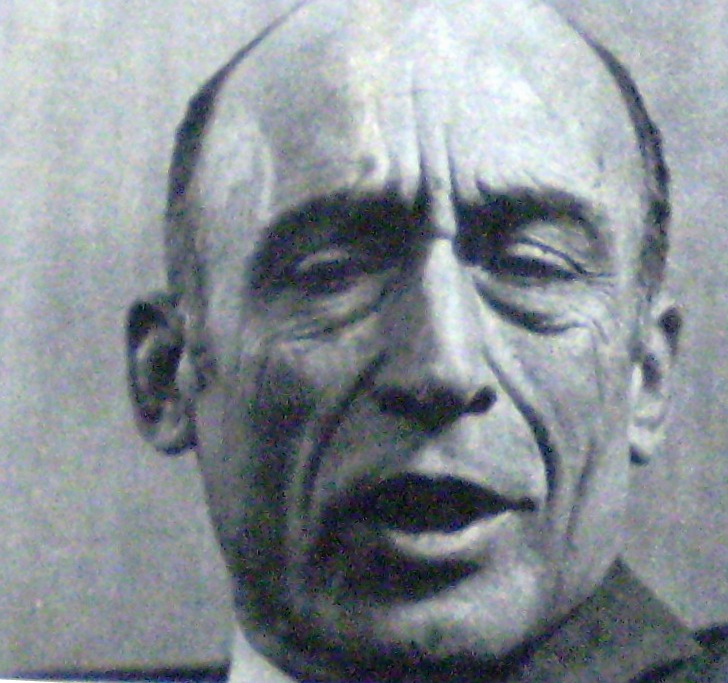
Argentine naval officer, journalist, and presidential candidate Francisco Manrique.

From 1974 to 1976, it formed part of the opposition to Isabel Perón. In the 1983 Argentine general election, the first since the 1976 coup, it was part of the Federal Alliance In 1987, the party merged into Raúl Alfonsín's Convergencia Programática party, before separating from it once again. In 1988, Manrique died and Guillermo Francos succeeded him as president, who resigned in favor of Martín Borrelli in 1998. Ten years later, the party was headed by Gustavo Forgione.
