= Third Position Party =

Argentine political party

Third Position Party Partido Tercera Posición
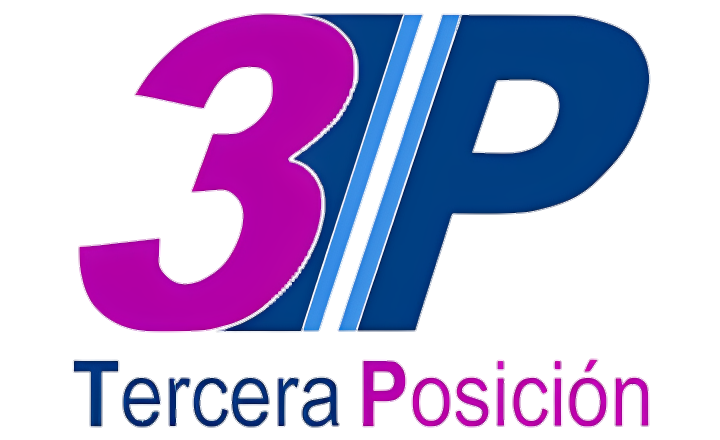
- Leader: Graciela Camaño
- Founded: 2013; 13 years ago
- Split from: Justicialist Party
- Membership (2017): ▲20,231
- Ideology: Federal Peronism; Third Way
- Political position: Center-right to right-wing
- National affiliation: Federal Consensus
- Colors: Purple
- Seats in the Chamber of Deputies: 1 / 257
- Seats in the Senate: 0 / 72

The Third Position Party (Spanish: Partido Tercera Posición; P3P) is a minor Peronist political party in Argentina. It was founded in 2015 by congresswoman Graciela Camaño and union leader Luis Barrionuevo as a split from the Justicialist Party. It supported Sergio Massa's unsuccessful presidential bid in 2015, and it is currently part of the Federal Consensus coalition. As Camaño is a sitting member of the Argentine Chamber of Deputies, the party has representation at the federal level.

The party's electoral debut was in 2013, when Barrionuevo ran for Congress in his native Catamarca in coalition with the Renewal Front; Barrionuevo was not elected. Since then, only Camaño has achieved electoral wins at the federal level, securing a seat in Buenos Aires Province in 2015 and 2019.

== Electoral performance ==
=== President ===
Election year	Candidate	Coalition	1st round	
Election year	Candidate	Coalition	# of overall votes	% of overall vote
2015	Sergio Massa	UNA	5,386,965 (3rd)	21.39 (lost)
2019	Roberto Lavagna	Federal Consensus	1,649,315 (3rd)	6.14 (lost)

=== Chamber of Deputies ===
Election year	Votes	%	seats won	total seats	position	presidency	notes
2013	4,074,732	18.00 (3rd)	0	0 / 257	Extra-parliamentary	Cristina Fernández de Kirchner (PJ—FPV)	within the FR
2015	4,115,414	17.65 (#3rd)	1	1 / 257	Minority	Mauricio Macri (PRO—Cambiemos)	within UNA
2017	1,467,558	5.71 (#4th)	0	1 / 257	Minority	Mauricio Macri (PRO—Cambiemos)	within 1País
2019	1,477,802	5.85 (#3rd)	1	1 / 257	Minority	Alberto Fernández (PJ—FDT)	within CF
