= Graciela Camaño =

Argentine lawyer and politician

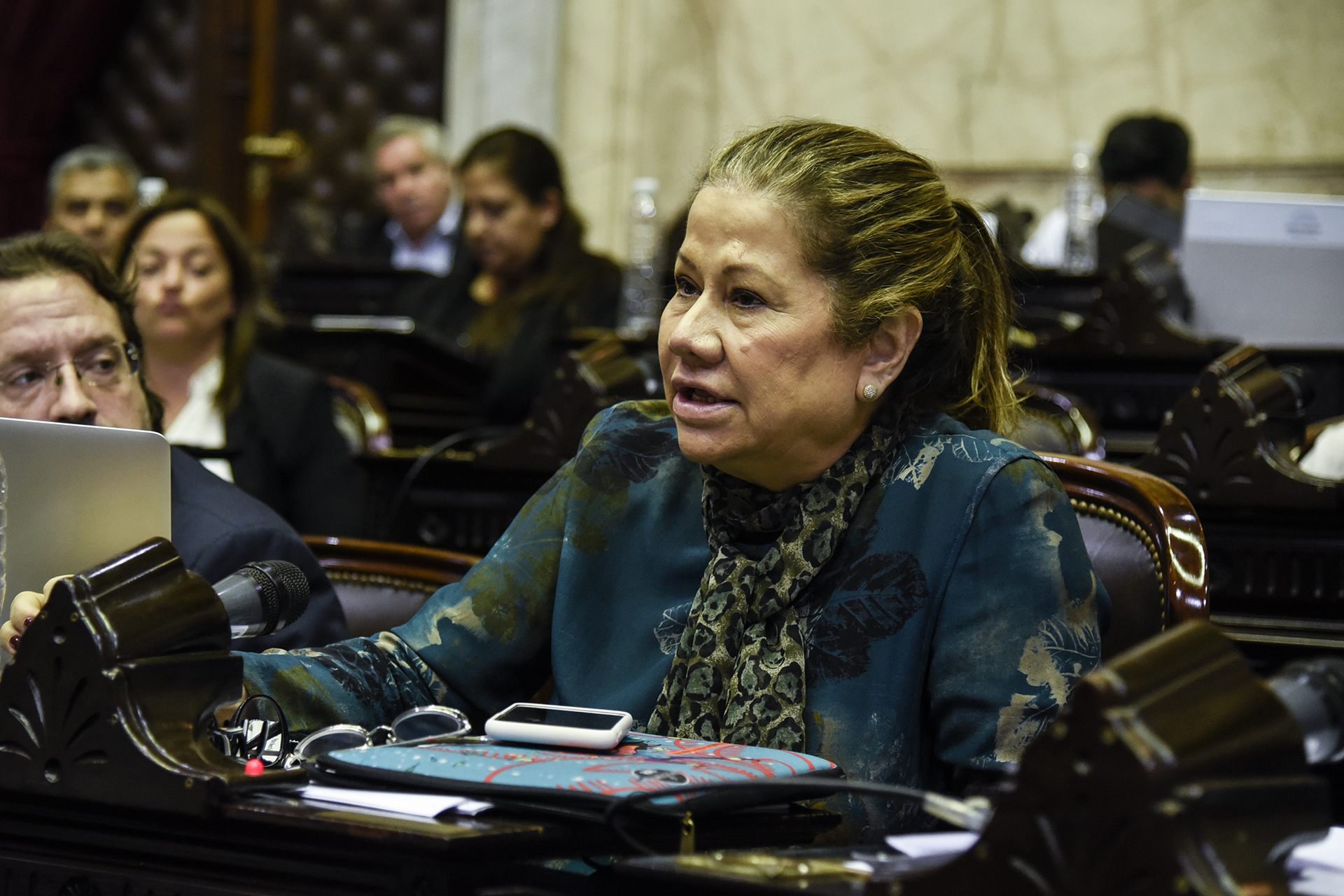

National Deputy
- In office 10 December 2003 – 10 December 2023
- Constituency: Buenos Aires Province
- In office 10 December 1997 – 3 May 2002
- Constituency: Buenos Aires Province
- In office 10 December 1989 – 10 December 1993
- Constituency: Buenos Aires Province

Councillor of Magistracy
- Incumbent
- Assumed office 21 November 2018
- Appointed by: Chamber of Deputies

Minister of Labour
- In office 3 May 2002 – 25 May 2003
- President: Eduardo Duhalde
- Preceded by: Alfredo Atanasof
- Succeeded by: Carlos Tomada

Personal details
- Born: 25 April 1953 (age 73) Sáenz Peña, Argentina
- Party: Third Position Party (since 2015); Justicialist Party (1983–2015)
- Other political affiliations: Front for Victory (2003-2009); Plural Consensus (2007–2009); Renewal Front (2013–2019); Federal Consensus (2019–2023)
- Spouse: Luis Barrionuevo (before 2021)
- Children: 2
- Education: University of Morón

Graciela Camaño (born 25 April 1953) is an Argentine lawyer and politician who served as a National Deputy for Buenos Aires Province for 28 years, from 1989 to 1993, later 1997 to 2002, and most recently from 2003 to 2023. Camaño also served as Minister of Labour during the presidency of Eduardo Duhalde between May 2002 and May 2003.

A longtime member of the Justicialist Party, in 2015 she founded the Third Position Party with her husband and political ally, Luis Barrionuevo.

== Early and personal life ==
Camaño was born in Presidencia Roque Sáenz Peña, Chaco Province, on 25 April 1953. She is married to Luis Barrionuevo, a prominent trade union leader in Argentina, who has been Senator for Catamarca.

She graduated from University of Morón in 2013, where she is a professor of Constitutional law. She remains a close ally of former president Duhalde.

In 2021, Camaño and Barrionuevo separated and ended their political relationship.

== Electoral history ==
Electoral history of Graciela Camaño
Election	Office	List	#	District	Votes			Result	Ref.
Election	Office	List	#	District	Total	%	P.	Result	Ref.
1989	National Deputy	Justicialist Front of National Unity	8	Buenos Aires Province	3,042,080	48.37%	1st (Note: Presented on an electoral list. The data shown represents the share of the vote the entire party/alliance received in that constituency.)	Elected	
1997	National Deputy	Buenos Aires Justicialist Front	9	Buenos Aires Province	2,846,238	41.44%	2nd	Elected	
2001	National Deputy	Justicialist Party	5	Buenos Aires Province	1,982,054	37.36%	1st	Elected	
2003	National Deputy	Justicialist Party	4	Buenos Aires Province	2,317,483	40.73%	1st	Elected	
2007	National Deputy	Front for Victory	8	Buenos Aires Province	3,016,229	43.02%	1st	Elected	
2011	National Deputy	Popular Front	1	Buenos Aires Province	541,408	6.73%	3rd	Elected	
2015	National Deputy	United for a New Alternative	2	Buenos Aires Province	1,888,415	20.98%	3rd	Elected	
2019	National Deputy	Federal Consensus	1	Buenos Aires Province	583,699	6.01%	3rd	Elected	
