= Mónica Fein =

Argentine politician

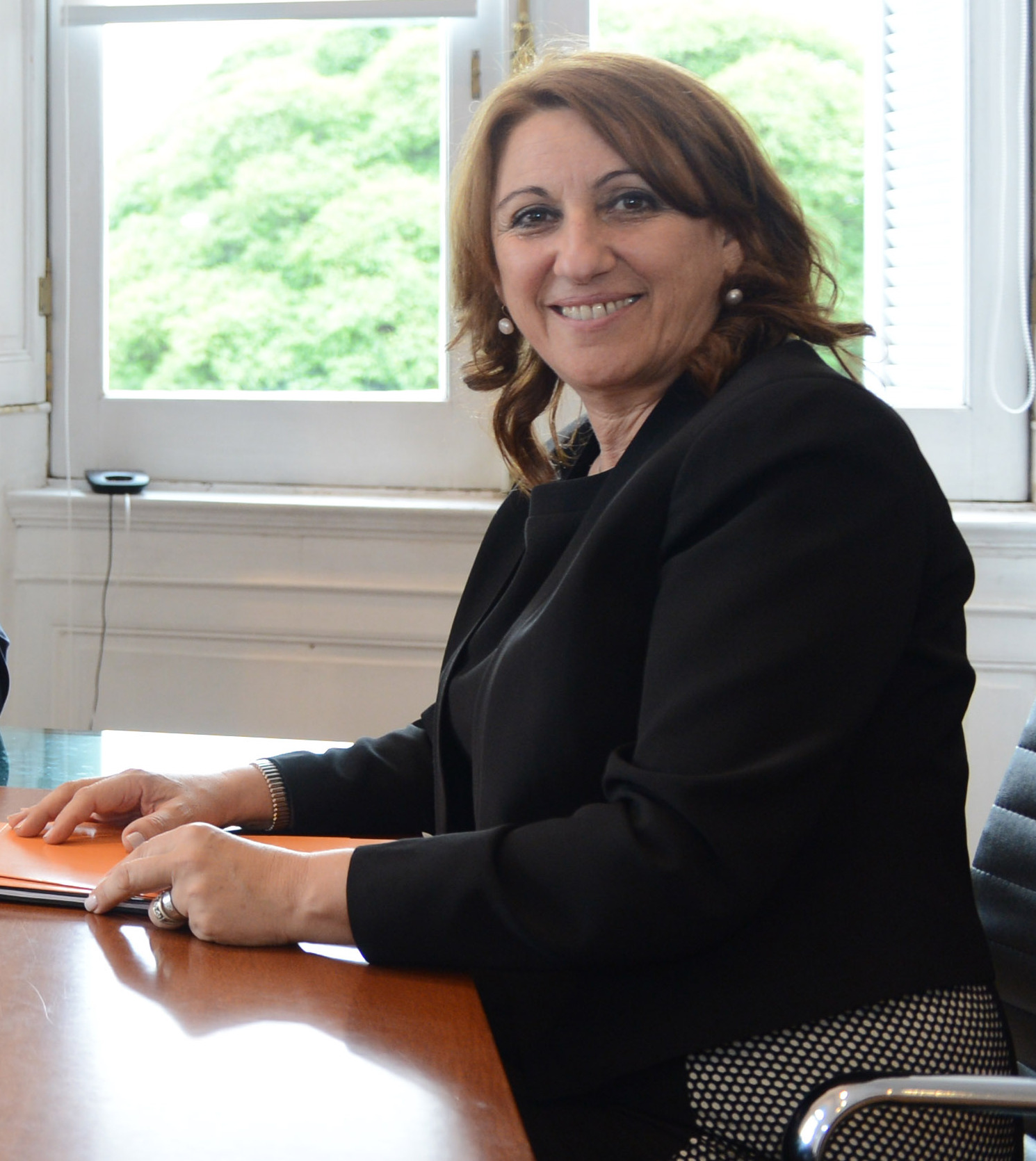

National Deputy
- Incumbent
- Assumed office 10 December 2021
- Constituency: Santa Fe
- In office 10 December 2007 – 10 December 2011
- Constituency: Santa Fe

President of the Socialist Party
- Incumbent
- Assumed office 6 June 2021
- Preceded by: Antonio Bonfatti

Mayor of Rosario
- In office 10 December 2011 – 10 December 2019
- Preceded by: Miguel Lifschitz
- Succeeded by: Pablo Javkin

Personal details
- Born: June 3, 1957 (age 69) Luján, Argentina
- Party: Popular Socialist Party; Socialist Party
- Other political affiliations: Alliance (1997–2001); Progressive, Civic and Social Front (2007–2023); Hacemos por Nuestro País (2023–present)
- Spouse: Miguel Caravacca
- Education: National University of Rosario
- Profession: Biochemist

Mónica Haydée Fein (born 3 June 1957) is an Argentine biochemist and Socialist Party politician who was intendente (mayor) of Rosario from 2011 to 2019. She has been a National Deputy since 2021, and previously held the same position from 2007 to 2011.

Since 2021, she has been president of the Socialist Party.

== Early life and education ==
Fein was born in Luján, Buenos Aires Province. She became active in politics at age 17, joining the Popular Socialist Party. She participated in the National Reform Movement as President of the Student Center of the School of Biochemistry and Pharmacy at the National University of Rosario, where she graduated with a degree in Biochemistry. She then served as Secretary of Student Welfare, as Faculty Graduate Advisor, and as Secretary of the UNR University Extension.

She began her training in Public Health at the Lazarte Institute. She participated in the creation of the Laboratory for Proprietary Medicinal (LEM) for the City of Rosario in 1992; the LEM, which coordinated its development with academia, would become a national model for the public production of pharmaceuticals. Fein was appointed Director of the City Sanitation Department in 1995, where she promoted more active food safety control by developing the Food Institute, a pioneer in Argentina in the field of locally based public food safety education and quality inspection.

== Political career ==
Hermes Binner, a fellow Socialist elected mayor of the city, appointed Fein Secretary of Public Health in 1997. She strengthened the local primary care network, focused efforts on hospital standards, and launched the Center for Ambulatory Medical Specialties of Rosario (CEMAR). She headed the party list of Socialist candidates to the City Council in 2001, and remained in the post until 2003, serving as President of the Health Commission.

Mayor Miguel Lifschitz retained Fein as Secretary of Public Health. She oversaw construction of the new Martín Maternity facility, and her management was recognized by the World Health Organization. She was elected to the Argentine Chamber of Deputies in 2007 for the Santa Fe Civic and Social Progressive Front, which led the Socialist Party caucus therein, and Fein was elected caucus president. She was named Secretary of the Commission for Social Action and Public Health, and also served in the Committees on Rules, Taxes, Constitutional Affairs, General Legislation, Population and Human Development, and the Elderly.

She was nominated as candidate for mayor of the city of Rosario by the Progressive, Civic and Social Front on 22 May 2011. She was elected on 24 July with 52.2% of the vote, defeating the runner-up, Héctor Cavallero, by 22% and becoming the first Socialist woman elected mayor in Argentine history.

== Electoral history ==
=== Executive ===
Electoral history of Mónica Fein
Election	Office	List	Votes			Result	Ref.
Election	Office	List	Total	%	P.	Result	Ref.
2011	Mayor of Rosario	Progressive, Civic and Social Front	260,936	52.15%	1st	Elected	
2015	Mayor of Rosario	Progressive, Civic and Social Front	165,845	30.19%	1st	Elected	
2023 PASO	Governor of Santa Fe	United to Change Santa Fe	139,773	14.25%	4th	Not elected (Note: Lost in the coalition's internal election.)	

=== Legislative ===
Electoral history of Mónica Fein
Election	Office	List	#	District	Votes			Result	Ref.
Election	Office	List	#	District	Total	%	P.	Result	Ref.
2001	Councillor	Santa Fe Alliance	1	Rosario	100,384	24.98%	2nd (Note: Presented on an electoral list. The data shown represents the share of the vote the entire party/alliance received in that constituency.)	Elected	
2007	National Deputy	Progressive, Civic and Social Front	3	Santa Fe Province	544,546	33.67%	2nd	Elected	
2021	National Deputy	Broad Progressive Front	1	Santa Fe Province	222,740	12.25%	3rd	Elected	

Party political offices
Preceded by Antonio Bonfatti	President of the Socialist Party; 2021–present	Succeeded by Incumbent
Political offices
Preceded by Miguel Lifschitz	Mayor of Rosario; 2011–2019	Succeeded by Pablo Javkin
