= Federal Peronism =

Political ideology in Argentina

Federal Peronism Peronismo Federal
- Leader: Miguel Ángel Pichetto
- Founder: Adolfo and Alberto Rodríguez Saá
- Founded: 2005; 21 years ago
- Headquarters: Buenos Aires
- Youth wing: Young Republican Peronists
- Ideology: Peronism; Anti-Kirchnerism; Conservatism; Factions: Menemism; Orthodox Peronism; Duhaldism
- Political position: Centre to centre-right
- National affiliation: Hacemos por Nuestro País List: Justicialist Party (factions); Front DO for Social Progress; Union for the Homeland List: Justicialist Party (factions); Conservative People's Party; Renewal Front; Federal Party; Juntos por el Cambio List: Dialogue Party; Avanzar San Luis; La Libertad Avanza List: Light Blue and White Union; Independent (Note: including parties which were part of different alliances in the 2023 primary elections) List: Federal Popular Union; Federal Commitment; Neuquén People's Movement; Third Position Party; Federal Renewal Party; Faith Party; Somos Energía para Renovar Santa Cruz
- Colours: Azure
- Seats in the Chamber of Deputies: 1 / 257
- Seats in the Senate: 4 / 72

Website
- www.pefed.com.ar

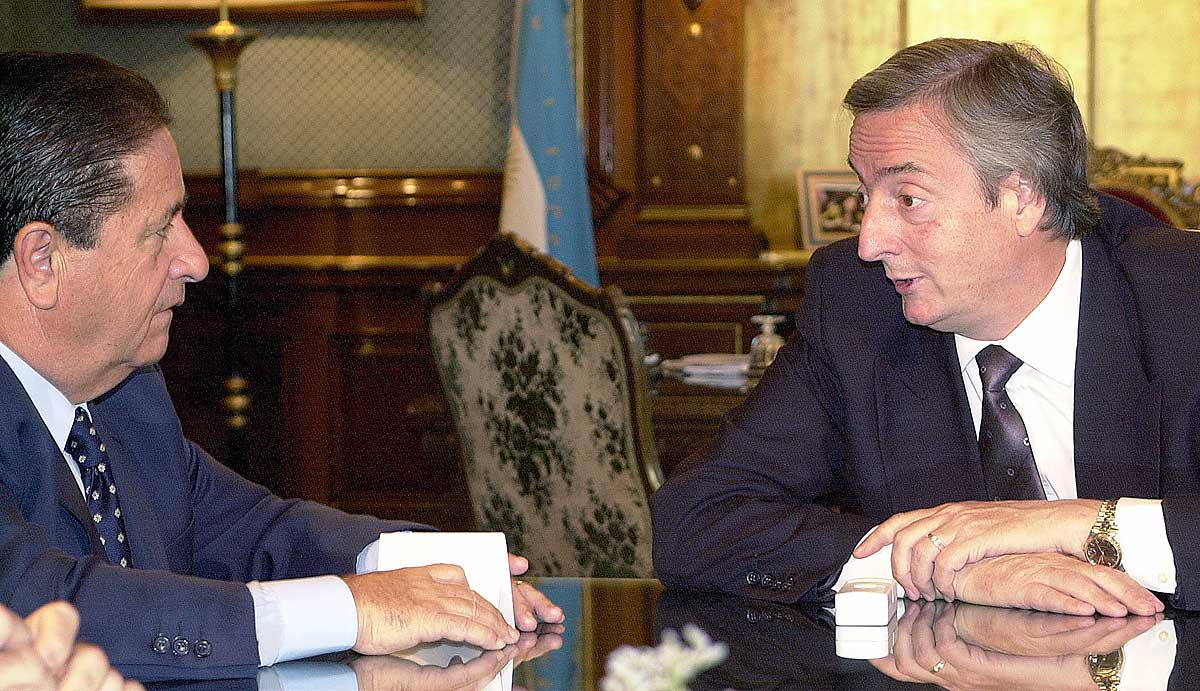
The endorsement of President Eduardo Duhalde was decisive in Néstor Kirchner's rise to power in 2003, and their later rivalry led Duhalde to form Federal Peronism.

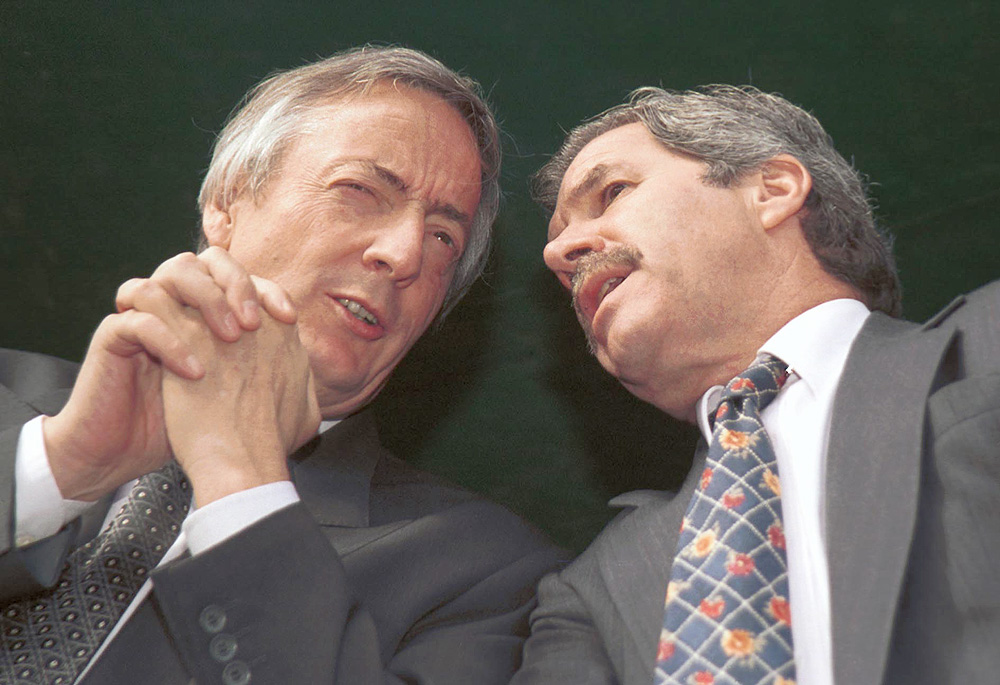
President Kirchner confers with Buenos Aires Province Governor Felipe Solá. Solá's break with Kirchner during the 2008 export tax dispute was perhaps the most significant boost to Federal Peronism.

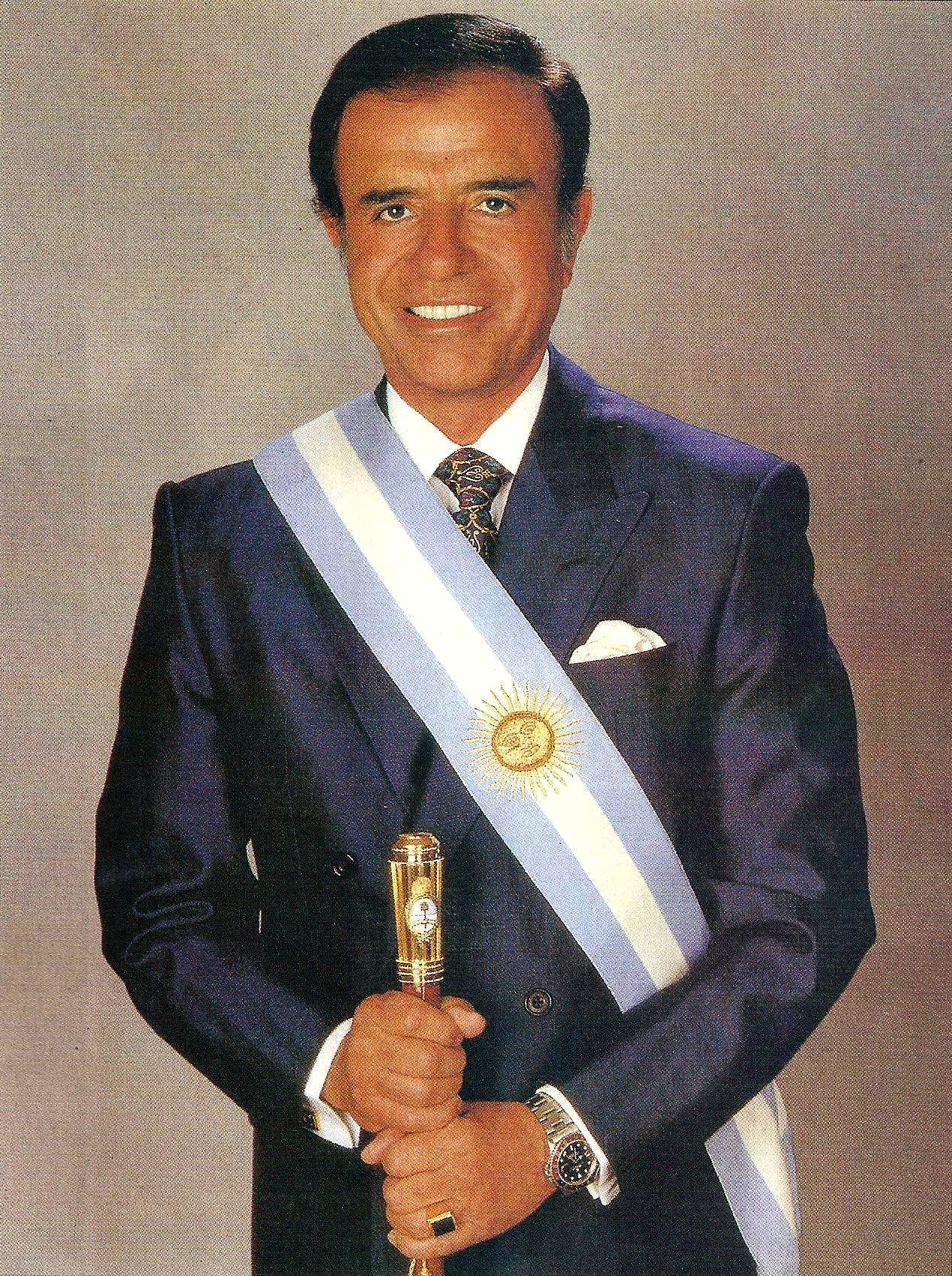
Carlos Menem served as President of Argentina from 1989 to 1999.

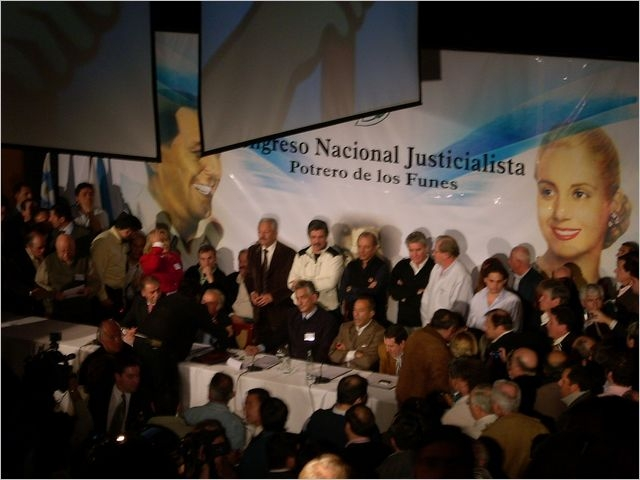
The 2007 Federal Peronist convention, in San Luis Province. Though dissident Peronism is active in most Argentine provinces, San Luis remains its stronghold.

Federal Peronism (Spanish: Peronismo Federal), also known as Dissident Peronism (Spanish: Peronismo Disidente), is the faction or branch of either moderate, centrist, or right-wing Peronism (a political movement in Argentina), that is currently identified mostly by its opposition to Kirchnerism, the left-wing faction of Peronism.

The term "Federal Peronism", as opposed to "metropolitan Peronism" (mainly from Greater Buenos Aires), was informally used since the 1980s to identify the more traditional and conservative Peronists from the Provinces of Argentina, whose governors grew in number and influence during the administration of President Carlos Menem. Federal Peronists are not an internal faction in the national Justicialist Party (PJ), and instead either control provincial PJ parties or form their own parties and alliances, including entering coalitions with the anti-Peronist right.

"Dissident Peronism" is more properly used to refer to the Peronist opposition to the administrations and party leadership of left-leaning Néstor Kirchner and Cristina Fernández de Kirchner. The term gained currency since the 2008 Argentine government conflict with the agricultural sector, when a number of party leaders, governors and legislators (mainly from the agroexporter provinces) withdrew their support of the national government.

== Overview ==
Following the crisis that precipitated the resignation of President Fernando de la Rúa on December 21, 2001, the opposition Justicialist Party won a majority in both houses of the Argentine Congress in the October 2001 mid-term elections. The first interim President of Argentina elected by Congress after de la Rúa's resignation, San Luis Province Senator Adolfo Rodríguez Saá, had the support of a group of governors and legislators from the hinterland provinces, from where the informal designation of Federal Peronism originated. He resigned a week later, however, after failing to gain support from other factions of Peronism, from organized labor, and other sectors of Argentine society. The former Governor of Buenos Aires Province and runner-up in the 1999 general election, Eduardo Duhalde was elected by the Congress as interim President of Argentina on January 2, 2002.

Eduardo Duhalde, who counted on the support of Buenos Aires Province Peronism and some labor union leaders, called elections for April 2003, and persuaded the fractious Justicialist Party to present candidates directly to the general elections, without party primaries. After attempting to endorse other candidates (Carlos Reutemann, who refused to run, and José Manuel de la Sota, who did badly at the polls), Duhalde threw his support behind the little-known Governor of Santa Cruz Province, Néstor Kirchner. Federal Peronists, in turn, were represented in the elections by two factions, one headed by former President Carlos Menem and Governor of Salta Province José Luis Romero, identified with the policies spoused by Menem's 1989-99 presidency, and the other by Adolfo Rodríguez Saá and his brother, Alberto Rodríguez Saá, in an alliance with Radical Civic Union lawmaker Melchor Posse. Menem and Kirchner emerged as the runoff candidates, but the former President withdrew on May 14 as he anticipated a landslide defeat (the polls favored Kirchner 70%–30%), and Kirchner became the president-elect.

== History ==
=== 2005 ===
The alliance between President Kirchner and Duhalde had been dissolved by the 2005 mid-term elections. Kirchner and Duhalde fielded their respective wives (each an influential lawmaker in her own right), Cristina Fernández de Kirchner and Hilda González de Duhalde, as leaders of their party lists in Buenos Aires Province (the nation's largest constituency). The landslide victory of the Kirchners' FpV consolidated their leadership role in the Justicialist Party, and this in turn forced Duhalde to break with the official Peronist body, the Justicialist Party, in which Kirchnerism had become the dominant force. He thus established Federal Peronism on November 4, 2005, and gathered a caucus of 25 Congressmen in its support.

=== 2007 ===
They later backed Alberto Rodríguez Saá's conservative Peronist candidacy in the 2007 presidential elections, where Mrs. Kirchner was elected to succeed her husband with 45% of the vote (twice that of the runner-up, and six times that of Rodríguez Saá).

Dissident Peronism was united by its opposition to Kirchner's Front for Victory (FpV), which became the leading vehicle for left-wing Peronists and incorporated much of the official Peronist structure. Among the early leaders in Dissident Peronism also included Misiones Province Senator Ramón Puerta, Buenos Aires Province Congressman Carlos Ruckauf, and union leader Luis Barrionuevo. Barrionuevo, unlike most members of the CGT, was allied with Menem, who arguably remained the most prominent spokesman for neo-liberal policies in Argentina.

=== 2009 ===
The 2008 Argentine government conflict with the agricultural sector over a proposed rise in export tariffs led to a sharp drop in presidential approval ratings, and numerous FpV lawmakers from more agrarian provinces broke with the party. The defections, which included 16 Lower House members and 4 Senators, thus resulted in the reemergence of Federal Peronism. The conflict also prompted Luis Barrionuevo, whose alliance with Menem had cost him support in the CGT, to organize a splinter trade union confederation, the "Blue and White CGT," to challenge the center-left wing leadership of Secretary General Hugo Moyano, albeit unsuccessfully. A dissident Peronist who as an ally of Menem had never joined the FpV, businessman Francisco de Narváez, in turn formed an alliance with the center-right PRO in Buenos Aires Province and the city of Buenos Aires for the 2009 elections.

The elections resulted in a setback for the governing, center-left Front for Victory and its allies, which lost their absolute majorities in both houses of Congress. Former President Néstor Kirchner stood as head of the FpV party list in the important Buenos Aires Province. Kirchner's list was defeated, however, by the center-right PRO/Federal Peronism list headed by de Narváez; the loss in Buenos Aires Province, though narrow, was significant as the province had helped maintain Kirchnerism as the dominant force in Argentine politics since 2003.

Federal Peronism emerged from the 2009 mid-term elections with 45 Congressmen and 10 Senators, becoming the fourth and third-largest caucus in each house, respectively.

=== 2011 ===
The alliance began preparations for the 2011 elections by agreeing to a primary election for April 3, thereby uniting behind a single candidate. Among the candidates running in the Federal Peronist primary were: former President Eduardo Duhalde; Senators Adolfo Rodríguez Saá, Juan Carlos Romero, and Carlos Reutemann; Congressmen Felipe Solá and Francisco de Narváez; and Governor Mario Das Neves. An alliance with PRO was also actively considered;

Buenos Aires Mayor Mauricio Macri expressed unwillingness to accept a running mate from outside PRO ranks, but ultimately withdrew his bid for the presidency.

Trailing in the polls ahead of the 2011 elections, Federal Peronists remained divided between Duhalde's Popular Front and Alberto Rodríguez Saá's Federal Commitment even after the national August primaries, with Rodríguez Saá attracting upscale voters, and Duhalde, older, mainly working-class voters. They finished third and fourth place in the October general election with 8% and 6% of the total vote, respectively.

=== 2013 ===
Governor José Manuel de la Sota of Córdoba Province formally became a dissident Peronist in September 2012 by establishing a local Justicialist Party faction opposed to Kirchnerism.

=== 2017 ===
Between 2017 and 2019, Federal Peronism sought to consolidate itself as a third force other than the ruling party and Kirchnerism, bringing together several of its members in the Federal Alternative space, led by the Governor of Salta, Juan Manuel Urtubey, the Governor of Cordoba, Juan Schiaretti, the leader of the Renewal Front Sergio Massa, and the Senator for Río Negro, Miguel Ángel Pichetto. After several round trips, and the failure of negotiations between said space and the former Minister of Economy and presidential candidate Roberto Lavagna, Federal Alternative began to crack.

=== 2019 ===
In June 2019, the main references joined other parties: Miguel Ángel Pichetto, Adolfo Rodríguez Saá and Juan Carlos Romero joined Juntos por el Cambio; Sergio Massa allies joined the Frente de Todos and Juan Manuel Urtubey joined Federal Consensus. Carlos Menem sat in the Frente de Todos in the Senate.

=== 2023 ===
The Federal Peronist option was unable to present an alternative Peronist force to the dominating Kirchnerist one. The victory of the mainstream Peronist forces in the 2019 election resulted in the "dismantling of the Federal Peronism alternative." In 2019, the Peronist dissidents left the Justicialist Party to form the Federal Consensus, which dissolved itself in 2023 and was succeeded by Hacemos por Nuestro País.

== Ideology ==
Federal Peronism covers various sectors of right-wing or centrist Peronism. It has been described to represent "moderate, centrist or right-wing Peronism". Federal Peronism lacks a coherent ideology and fails to stand out from the Cambiemos coalition, particularly on economic grounds. Federal Peronism is overall more socially conservative than Kirchnerism while still following the Peronist tenets of economic nationalism and social justice. According to Pierre Ostiguy and Aaron Schneider, all Federal Peronists leaders are to the right of Kirchnerism. Some political scientists classify Federal Peronism as centre-right, while the Manifesto Research on Political Representation (MARPOR) classified it as centrist and almost perfectly aligned with the "absolute centre".

According to political scientist Pierre Ostiguy, Federal Peronism combines "popular cultural conservatism with developmentalist, pro-business policies", emphasizes anti-crime legislation, and opposes the dominance of Kirchnerism. Martín Retamozo and Mauricio Schuttenberg described Federal Peronism as "broadly characterized by its commitment to good relations with the Catholic Church and sectors of the local business community, and a rhetoric based on social justice." Federal Peronists opposed the introduction of same-sex marriage in Argentina, decrying it as gender ideology. One of the prominent Federal Peronists, senator Liliana Negre de Alonso, argued: "I am concerned about what we are going to do with sex education, because from this law project sexuality is built. Now we will have to teach our children what lesbianism is, what gay is, what bisexual is, what transsexual is."

The movement represents first and foremost the diverse interests of state-level Peronist activists and leaders, who stay in opposition to Kirchnerism. Electorally, the goal of Federal Peronism was to prevent voters disaffected with Kirchnerism from defecting to anti-Peronist parties and present itself as a "third-way" candidacy that would maintain the diverse support bases of the Peronist movement. In comparison to Kirchnerism, Federal Peronism puts an emphasis on more republican and less populist values, and focuses more on regionalist and decentralist causes. It seeks to represent "Peronism before Kirchnerism" and promotes Peronist features that the movement had before being "re-founded" by Kirchnerism, which restored Peronism to the left-wing orientation it had under Juan Perón.

Federal Peronists sought to present themselves as the third way between Kirchnerism and the anti-Peronist Macrism. Miguel Ángel Pichetto stated that the movement wanted to differentiate itself from Citizen's Unity, condemning this Kirchnerist coalition for forging "alliances with Trotskyism" and "thinking that by breaking everything there is a possibility of returning to power", stating that Federal Peronists "are not that kind of the left". Federal Peronism was introduced as a "democratic, republican, and federal Peronism", and presented itself as anti-populist, portraying Kirchnerism as an authoritarian, centralized and populist force. A divisive point amongst Federal Peronists was the question of shared identity with Kirchnerist Peronism. Some Federal Peronists, such as Sergio Massa and his Renewal Front, postulated a need for building a broad Peronist front and reconciled themselves with Kirchnerists, while others such as Pichetto considered anti-Kirchnerism more important, forging alliances with anti-Peronist forces which were justified as "rationality".

== Electoral history ==
=== Presidential elections ===
Election year	Candidate(s)	Primaries		First Round		Second Round		Result	Party - Coalition
Election year	Candidate(s)	# votes	% vote	# votes	% vote	# votes	% vote	Result	Party - Coalition
2003	Carlos Menem			4,741,202	24.45			✗ Won in the first round, but he resigned for the second round	Front for Loyalty
2003	Adolfo Rodríguez Saá			2,736,091	14.11			✗ Defeated	Front of the Popular Movement
2007	Alberto Rodríguez Saá			1,458,955	7.64			✗ Defeated	Justice, Union and Liberty Front
2007	Jorge Sobisch			268,401	1.40			✗ Defeated	Movement of the United Provinces
2011	Eduardo Duhalde	2,595,996	12.10	1,285,830	5.86			✗ Defeated	Popular Front
2011	Alberto Rodríguez Saá	1,749,971	8.17	1,745,354	7.96			✗ Defeated	Federal Commitment
2015	Mauricio Macri	5,523,413	24.49	8,601,131	34.15	12,988,349	51.34	✓ Won	Cambiemos
2015	Sergio Massa	3,230,887	14.33	5,386,965	21.39			✗ Defeated	United for a New Alternative
2015	José Manuel de la Sota	1,408,518	6.25					✗ Defeated	United for a New Alternative
2015	Adolfo Rodríguez Saá	472,341	2.09	412,577	1.64			✗ Defeated	Federal Commitment
2019	Mauricio Macri	8,121,689	31.80	10,811,345	40.28			✗ Defeated	Juntos por el Cambio
2019	Roberto Lavagna	2,081,315	8.15	1,649,315	6.14			✗ Defeated	Federal Consensus
2023	Sergio Massa	5,277,538	22.68	9,853,492	36.78	11,516,142	44.31	✗ Defeated	Union for the Homeland
2023	Juan Schiaretti	914,812	3.93	1,802,068	6.73			✗ Defeated	We Do for Our Country

=== Congressional elections ===
==== Chamber of Deputies ====
Election year	votes	%	seats won	Total seats	Position	Presidency	Note
2005	1,812,831	10.6	16	65 / 257	Minority	Néstor Kirchner (FPV—PJ)	
2007	681,404		2	9 / 257	Minority	Néstor Kirchner (FPV—PJ)	
2009				45 / 257	Minority	Cristina Kirchner (FPV—PJ)	
2011	771,288	3.8	10	39 / 257	Minority	Cristina Kirchner (FPV—PJ)	
2013	5,903,016	25.74	26	37 / 257	Minority	Cristina Kirchner (FPV—PJ)	
2015	4,390,461	18.83	16	41 / 257	Minority	Mauricio Macri (Cambiemos-PRO)	
2017	6,015,303	24.64	31	72 / 257	Minority	Mauricio Macri (Cambiemos-PRO)	
2019	1,878,282	7.33	4	10 / 257	Minority	Alberto Fernández (FDT-PJ)	
2021	1,313,858	5.65	3	5 / 257	Minority	Alberto Fernández (FDT-PJ)	

==== Senate elections ====
Election year	votes	%	seats won	Total seats	Position	Presidency	Note
2005	1,423,365	17.9	4	21 / 72	Minority	Néstor Kirchner (FPV—PJ)	
2007	333,230		0	4 / 72	Minority	Néstor Kirchner (FPV—PJ)	
2009				10 / 72	Minority	Cristina Kirchner (FPV—PJ)	
2011	665,193	6.6	2	8 / 72	Minority	Cristina Kirchner (FPV—PJ)	
2013	213,676	4.15	1	9 / 72	Minority	Cristina Kirchner (FPV—PJ)	
2015	1,235,581	17.31	1	6 / 72	Minority	Mauricio Macri (Cambiemos-PRO)	
2017	1,154,657	9.73	0	0 / 72	Extra-parliamentary	Mauricio Macri (Cambiemos-PRO)	
2019	327,962	5.82	0	0 / 72	Extra-parliamentary	Alberto Fernández (FDT-PJ)	
2021	735,725	10.57	1	1 / 72	Minority	Alberto Fernández (FDT-PJ)	

=== Provincial elections ===
Province	Election year	Candidate(s)	Result			Party - Coalition
Province	Election year	Candidate(s)	# votes	% vote	Winner	Party - Coalition
Córdoba	2023	Martín Llaryora	870,935	45.20	✓ Won	We Do for Córdoba
Misiones	2023	Hugo Passalacqua	424,533	64.18	✓ Won	Front for the Renewal of Concord
Neuquén	2023	Marcos Koopmann	137,965	34.40	✗ Defeated	Neuquén People's Movement
Salta	2023	Gustavo Sáenz	337.621	47,51	✓ Won	Salta Identity Party
Santa Cruz	2023	Claudio Vidal	54.831	33.31	✓ Won	Por Santa Cruz
