= Federal Consensus =

Argentine political coalition

Federal Consensus Consenso Federal
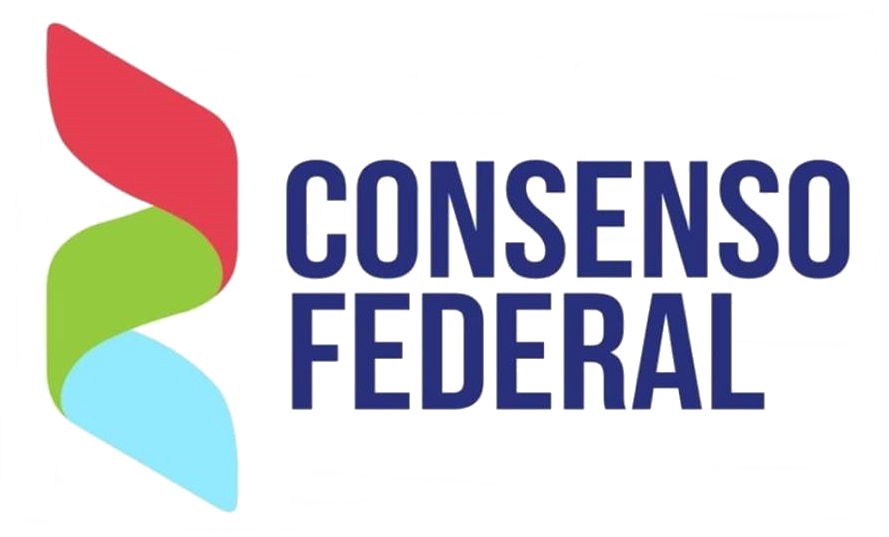
- Abbreviation: CF
- Leader: Roberto Lavagna
- Congress Leaders: Eduardo Bucca
- Founders: Roberto Lavagna; Juan Manuel Urtubey
- Founded: 12 June 2019; 6 years ago
- Dissolved: 2 June 2023; 2 years ago
- Split from: Renewal Front
- Succeeded by: Hacemos por Nuestro País
- Ideology: Third Way; Federal Peronism; Progressivism
- Political position: Centre to centre-right

Website
- www.lavagna.com.ar/consenso-federal/

Federal Consensus (Spanish: Consenso Federal, CF) was an electoral coalition in Argentina formed to support the alliance between Roberto Lavagna and Juan Manuel Urtubey in 2019 general election. It is formed by dissidents of the Justicialist Party, the Socialist Party, the Freemen of the South Movement, the Federal Party, the Christian Democratic Party, the Third Position Party and the Light Blue and White Union.

The only quartermaster won by the alliance in the 2019 elections was the Chivilcoy party, in the province of Buenos Aires. Guillermo Britos was reelected mayor with 48.05%. In the 2019 presidential election, Federal Consensus placed third behind the Frente de Todos and Juntos por el Cambio. Since then, the alliance has formed a parliamentary group called Interbloque Federal, which has 11 deputies in the Congress. In 2021, ahead of that year's legislative election, the GEN Party announced it would be leaving Federal Consensus and instead backed the main opposition Juntos por el Cambio.

== History ==
On June 12, 2019, it was announced that Roberto Lavagna (Consenso 19) and Juan Manuel Urtubey (Alternativa Federal), agreed to integrate a formula in which they would respectively be candidates for president and vice president, representing Consenso Federal.

Vice presidential candidate Juan Manuel Urtubey is a lawyer and has served as university professor, deputy and governor of the province of Salta during different periods, between 2007 and 2019. For his part, Roberto Lavagna is an economist, diplomat, politician and professor, who served as head of the Ministry of Economy and Production of Argentina during the presidency of Eduardo Duhalde and then of Néstor Kirchner, during the period between 2002 and 2005. In 2007, he ran for Presidency of Argentina, under the An Advanced Nation coalition with the backing of the Radical Civic Union where he obtained the third place with 16.89% of the votes. He ran again as a candidate for president in the Elections of 2019, where he obtained 6.14% of the votes.

Graduating in Political Economy from the University of Buenos Aires, in 1967, he was part of the Ministry of Economy during the last presidency of Juan Domingo Perón; he was Negotiator of the Argentina-Brazil Integration during the presidency of Raúl Alfonsín; Ambassador Extraordinary and Plenipotentiary to international economic organizations between 2000 and 2002; and Minister of Economy and Production during the presidency of Eduardo Duhalde, ratified in the post by President Néstor Kirchner in 2003, where he remained until 2005, being the official who remained the longest in that position since 1996. As Minister, he was the architect of Argentina's overcoming the 2001 economic crisis, promoted the lifting of the corralito in 2002 and managed the Argentine debt swap at the beginning of 2005. Part of his work experience has been gathered as author of different books related to integration, economy and the future of Argentina.

Florencio Randazzo and Roberto Lavagna once again bet on an option outside the "crack" for the legislative elections. Teams of former ministers work together for legislative elections. But also with 2023 on the horizon, with the goal of building a competitive national force.

== Ideology ==
Lavagna is a Peronist and an economist with moderate ideas and is in tune with the fatigue generated by polarization in a growing sector of society. His nomination has the support of anti-Kirchner Peronism, sectors of radicalism dissatisfied with the government, and progressive forces such as the Socialist Party.

== Electoral campaign ==
On October 24, 2019, Consenso Federal presented its ballot for the polling stations in the presidential elections of Argentina 2019, with the former Minister of Economy Roberto Lavagna as candidate for president and the governor of Salta Juan Manuel Urtubey for vice president.

During the campaign, Roberto Lavagna presented an important battery of proposals, among which they highlighted the fight against hunger and "putting money in the pockets of Argentines."

For the fight against hunger, Lavagna marked as a priority the need to declare the National Food Emergency Plan and guarantee that every Argentine would have access to immediate consumption. Furthermore, in order to make the result sustainable, Lavagna proposed "To increase the resources destined to school canteens affected to the Food Emergency Program" and "To include Secondary Schools in need of school food services, also with national funds".

The closing of the electoral campaign took place in Salta, where Urtubey, the candidate for vice-president, was governor. There, Roberto Lavagna—an experienced politician and convinced that in the exercise of the government there cannot be financial conservatism and that the state intervention must be adequate—emphasized that Consenso Federal "was the only formula that faced the campaign with projects".

== Members ==
Party	Leader	Ideology	Position
Christian Democratic Party	Juan Fernando Brügge	Christian democracy, Social conservatism	Centre to Centre-right
Federal Party	Miguel Saredi	Federalism	Centre
Freemen of the South Movement	Humberto Tumini	Progressivism	Centre-left
Socialist Party	Mónica Fein	Social Democracy, Democratic socialism	Centre-left
Third Position Party	Graciela Camaño	Peronism, Third Way	Centre
Authentic Socialist Party	Mario Mazzitelli	Social Democracy, Democratic socialism	Left-wing
Renewal Crusade	Nancy Avelín	Federalism	Centre

=== Former members ===
Party	Leader	Ideology	Position
Generation for a National Encounter	Margarita Stolbizer	Social democracy	Centre to Centre-left
Protector Political Force	José Luis Ramón	Social democracy	Centre-left
Light Blue and White Union	Carlos Fabian Luayza	Federal Peronism, Conservatism	Centre-right

== Legislative composition ==
=== Chamber of Deputies ===
Interbloque Federal (11)
Block	Portrait	Deputy	Province	Mandate	
Block	Portrait	Deputy	Province	Start	End
Federal Córdoba (4)	Paulo Leonardo Cassinerio	Paulo Leonardo Cassinerio	Córdoba	2017	2021
Federal Córdoba (4)	Alejandra María Vigo	Alejandra María Vigo	Córdoba	2017	2021
Federal Córdoba (4)	Carlos Mario Gutiérrez	Carlos Gutierrez	Córdoba	2019	2023
Federal Córdoba (4)	Claudia Gabriela Márquez	Claudia Marquez	Córdoba	2017	2021
Federal Consensus (3)	Gcamano	Graciela Camaño	Buenos Aires	2019	2023
Federal Consensus (3)	Alejandro Esteban Rodriguez	Alejandro Esteban "Topo" Rodríguez	Buenos Aires	2019	2023
Federal Consensus (3)	Jorge Emilio Sarghini	Jorge Emilio Sarghini	Buenos Aires	2017	2021
Justicialist (2)	Eduardo Bucca	Eduardo "Bali" Bucca	Buenos Aires	2017	2021
Justicialist (2)	Andrés Zottos	Andrés Zottos	Salta	2017	2021
Progressive, Civic and Social Front (1)	Luis Gustavo Contigiani	Luis Contigiani	Santa Fe	2017	2021
Socialist (1)	Enrique Eloy Estevez	Enrique Estévez	Santa Fe	2019	2023

== Federal Consenus Bloc ==
After the 2019 presidential elections, Federal Consensus obtained three seats of national deputies in Congress: Graciela Camano, Alejandro "Topo" Rodríguez and Enrique Estévez. The first two for the Province of Buenos Aires, and the third for Santa Fe, as a candidate of the Socialist Party. In December 2019, Jorge Sarghini assumed a seat as a deputy and joined the Federal Consensus Bloc.

== Electoral history ==
=== Presidential elections ===
Election year	Candidate(s)	First Round		Second Round		Result
Election year	Candidate(s)	# votes	% vote	# votes	% vote	Result
2019	Roberto Lavagna	1,649,315	6.14	—N/a		✗ Lost

=== Chamber of Deputies ===
Election year	Votes	%	seats won	total seats	position	presidency
2019	1,500,442	5.85 (#3rd)	3	11 / 257	Minority	Alberto Fernández (PJ—FDT)
