= Rafael Resnick Brenner =

Argentine lawyer, businessman and public official

- Born: 24 June 1964 (age 62); Buenos Aires, Argentina
- Occupations: Lawyer, businessman
- Years active: 2009–2011 (AFIP)
- Employer: Administración Federal de Ingresos Públicos
- Known for: Chief of Staff of AFIP (2009–2011); defendant in the Boudougate case

Rafael Resnick Brenner (Buenos Aires; June 24, 1964) is an Argentine lawyer and businessman who served as chief of staff of the Federal Administration of Public Revenue (Administración Federal de Ingresos Públicos, or AFIP) from 2009 to 2011. He is one of the six defendants in the Boudougate case.

Resnick Brenner was unknown to the general public until Boudougate. He is accused of being responsible for managing an "outrageous" payment plan whereby the government would pay 240 million pesos that was owed by the printing firm Ciccone Calcográfica to a collection agency.

== Early life ==
Resnick Brenner was born on June 26, 1964, in Buenos Aires, the son of Moisés Resnick Brenner and Ana Teresa Musso Muller. In the 1990s he bought an apartment in the Belgrano district of Buenos Aires.

== Career ==
=== Club de Campo Pueyrredón ===
As of January 1999, he was president of the Club de Campo Pueyrredón, an exclusive residential area along the Pan American Highway near the city of Pilar. "The idea is to be able to live in peace without being inside a prison. It doesn't have to be a fortress to make you feel secure," Resnick Brenner said about the club.

=== Adevifra ===
As of 2007, Resnick Brenner was working with Adevifra, the Argentine Association for the Defense of Family Housing. Adevifra is a group of homeowners with mortgage debts dating back to the 1980s. Some sources identify him as director of that organization, while others described him as counsel for Adevifra. In August 2007, Resnick Brenner filed a complaint on behalf of Adevifra against former Economy Minister Felisa Miceli, accusing her of fraud and "breach of the duties of public officials to the detriment of public administration." Specifically, Miceli was accused of involvement in a scheme whereby home purchasers receiving mortgages were diverted to law firms that doubled or tripled their down payments.

=== AFIP ===
In 2009, Resnick Brenner was hired as chief of staff of the Federal Administration of Public Revenue (Administración Federal de Ingresos Públicos, or AFIP). His superior was Ricardo Echegaray, whom he had met at a rugby club.

At the time he began the job, he had assets of 26,300 pesos. By 2010, according to information presented to the Anticorruption Office, Resnick Brenner had increased his assets by 4100%.

He was chief of staff of AFIP until June 2011.

== Ciccone scandal ==
Resnick Brenner was a key figure in the AFIP at the time of the Ciccone scandal. On October 19, 2010, the AFIP approved of the lifting of the bankruptcy of Argentina's largest printing firm, Ciccone Calcográfica, and agreed on a payment plan that would permit the firm to resume printing. It was Resnick Brenner who recommended that Ciccone Calcográfica be given a discount on its tax liabilities and who allegedly agreed to a payment plan that benefited Ciccone Calcográfica after it filed for bankruptcy in 2010. La Nación later determined, based on telephone records, that Resnick Brenner had signed two opinions both of which supported the provision of funds for a payment plan for Ciccone.

At least two government officials challenged Resnick Brenner's action on behalf of Ciccone Calcográfica. The Director of Legal Affairs at the Ministry of Economy, José Guillermo Capdevila, challenged Resnick Brenner and reportedly got into trouble with the AFIP as a result. On November 9, 2010, in defiance of Capdevila, Boudou signed the recommendation to help Ciccone. The next day, Resnick Brenner asked the AFIP's legal department to approve the removal of capital.

The Perfil newspaper reported in August 2012 that Resnick Brenner was more criminally responsible than the director of AFIP, Ricardo Echegaray, because it was he who had acted to remove Ciccone Calcográfica's capital debt in November 2010, which was not a decision that he had any power to make.

It was reported on May 31, 2014, that on July 17, 2014, Alejandro Vandenbroele and Resnick Brenner would have to appear in court. On June 12, 2014, Resnick Brenner was questioned by Judge Ariel Lijo. He presented Lijo with a written statement in which he declared that Amado Boudou, during his tenure as Minister of Economy, had sent his chief adviser, César Guido Forcieri, and his friend José María Nuñez Carmona to meet with Resnick Brenner to inquire about the procedure for granting Ciccone Calcográfica a payment plan. Resnick Brenner said that he did not remember the date of the meeting. Clarin stated that Resnick Brenner's statement "seriously complicate[d]" matters for Boudou, who had sought to distance himself from the controversy surrounding lifting of the bankruptcy of Ciccone Calcográfica. At his June 12 appearance before Lijo, Resnick Brenner asked the judge to dismiss him from the case.

Resnick Brenner was indicted by Lijo on June 27, 2014.

In 2014, Federal prosecutor Jorge Di Lello called for Resnick Brenner to be summoned for questioning. On February 19, 2015, Judges Jorge Ballestero, Eduardo Farah, and Eduardo Freiler of the Federal Criminal Appeals Court confirmed Judge Lijo's indictments of Boudou, Núñez Carmona, Alejandro Vandenbroele, Nicolás Ciccone, Resnick Brenner, and Forcieri.

=== Salta ===
After the Boudougate scandal broke in 2012, according to one source, Brenner was not fired from the AFIP but "ended up being rewarded," as Hugo Alconada Moon, a columnist for La Nación and author of a book about Boudougate, stated. Resnick Brenner was put in charge of AFIP in the province of Salta, where he lives. Instead of living in a rented house or apartment, "as is the custom for those officials who are transferred to Salta from other provinces or from the federal capital," Resnick Brenner was installed at the International Hotel Alejandro I, the province's most exclusive hotel. In August 2014, FM News reported that Resnick Brenner was living at the hotel, a five-star establishment on Belgrano Square in the center of Salta. A week later, Resnick Brenner confirmed that he was living at the hotel but said that he was paying a cheaper rate than people who stayed at the hotel for just a few nights.

In addition to his address in Salta, Resnick Brenner continued to maintain his residences at Club de Campo Pueyrredón and on calle Carlos Pellegrini in Buenos Aires. In addition, AFIP supplied him with a car and chauffeur. Asked about rumors that he was earning 75,000 pesos a month, Resnick Brenner said it was "slander."

Resnick Brenner's activities in Salta have led to controversy. "From the moment Resnick Brenner took office in Salta," reports one source, he "launched a well-oiled machinery to squeeze entrepreneurs and farmers," and began collecting "millions in bribes," mostly in the vicinity of Oran, where officials of the Federal Court No. 2, located in that town, are suspected of being complicit in his activities. The shakedown process allegedly involves the leveling of false accusations of operational irregularities, such as the use of slave labor, and the issuing of threats of severe sanctions that can only be lifted through the payment of bribes. Resnick Brenner and his cohorts have reportedly "demanded bribes ranging from one million to 10 million pesos, depending on the size of the business or farm." Some businessmen ended up in prison for several days for resisting Resnick Brenner's extortion efforts.

Among other activities, Resnick Brenner ordered a raid on a 16,000-hectare farm in the department of Oran, and issued a report maintaining that 157 employees had been found to be working in deplorable conditions. In one case in which he claimed to have uncovered the use of slave labor, as well as "a 12-year-old working in very poor condition and people who did not eat for three days," Resnick Brenner refused to identify the employers in question, purportedly for reasons of "tax secrecy."

== Taxes ==
As of 2014, Resnick Brenner, the former chief of staff of the Argentine tax agency, was facing "two judgments for unpaid taxes in the province of Buenos Aires."
