= Máximo Lanusse =

Máximo Eduardo Lanusse (born October 11, 1973) is an Argentinian lawyer and banker who was the Administration Manager of Banco Macro. He has been investigated by the Argentinian judiciary for his involvement in the "Boudougate" scandal.

== Early life and education ==
Born on October 11, 1973, Lanusse received his law degree from the University of Buenos Aires.

== Career ==
=== Macro Bank ===
He was the Administration Manager of Banco Macro beginning in February 2007. According to La Nación, Banco Macro distanced itself from Lanusse as the Boudougate scandal grew in 2012. He was forced to leave the bank, although his brother, Javier, continued to run a branch of the bank in the province of Jujuy.

== Boudougate ==
Lanusse was vice president of the shell company The Old Fund, chaired by Alejandro Vandenbroele, which purchased 70% of the shares of the printing firm Ciccone Calcografica. Ciccone Calcografica later changed its name to the Compañía de Valores Sudamericana (American Securities Company), or CVS, upon the naming of Lanusse and Nicolas Ciccone Tadeo as members of its board in July 2011. The purpose of the acquisition of Ciccone Calcografica was to profit from federal government contracts for the production of currency.

La Nación reported on September 5, 2012, that Lanusse had deposited a total of about $5.4 million in an account in Banco Santander Río in the name of The Old Fund several weeks before the Boudougate scandal broke. These deposits raised concerns at the bank, which sent a "suspicious transaction report" to the Financial Intelligence Unit. They occurred at a time when The Old Fund was making money, earning $13 million from the Front for Victory (FPV) for the printing of election ballots and contracting with the National Mint for the printing of $100 banknotes at a price of $9.6 million per month. Because of the need to pay wages as well as the debts of the former incarnation of Ciccone Calcografica, the funds Lanusse deposited in the bank were crucial for the firm's survival.

An October 2012 news story in Clarín revealed that Vandenbroele had earned 38,000 pesos a month as president of CVS, while Lanusse had earned 48,000 pesos as the same firm's vice president, according to a new government report. Clarín noted that it is unheard of for the salary of a company's vice president to exceed that of its president, and described this "inexplicable" situation as "one more of the many curiosities about the Ciccone scandal."

On June 2, 2014, prosecutor Jorge Di Lello asked Judge Ariel Lijo to order an investigation of Lanusse, in addition to José Maria Nuñez Carmona, Alejandro Vandenbroele, and others, for their involvement in "different stages" of the irregular activity surrounding The Old Fund's purchase of Ciccone Calcografica SA. Lijo ordered the investigation shortly thereafter. Allegedly, Lanusse had deposited large sums of money into the firm's accounts in Banco Macro. Reports stated that The Old Fund was financed principally by the Cooperativa de Crédito Marítima del Sur, managed by Cirilo Zavalía, who was linked to the Macro Group. Another firm that partially financed The Old Fund was Facimex Bursátil Sociedad de Bolsa, which placed $620 million in government securities into an account that Dusbel, a subsidiary of The Old Fund, opened at Facimex. These securities, converted into pesos, were deposited into The Old Fund's account in Macro Bank.

It was reported on June 12, 2014, that Lanusse was the real CEO of CVS, with Alejandro Vandenbroele being only a front man.

A report on June 30, 2014, in the political journal Letra P stated that prosecutor Jorge Di Lello, since three days earlier, had had "an obsession," namely ensuring the investigation of Lanusse. The report stated that Lanusse, according to many who had encountered him over the course of his banking career, had never been particularly bright, but "no one denies that he moved like a lynx" when selling anything and making a profit off of it.

== Personal life ==
As of September 2012, Lanusse lived in a rented apartment in Recoleta.
