= Juan Carlos Alderete =

Argentine politician

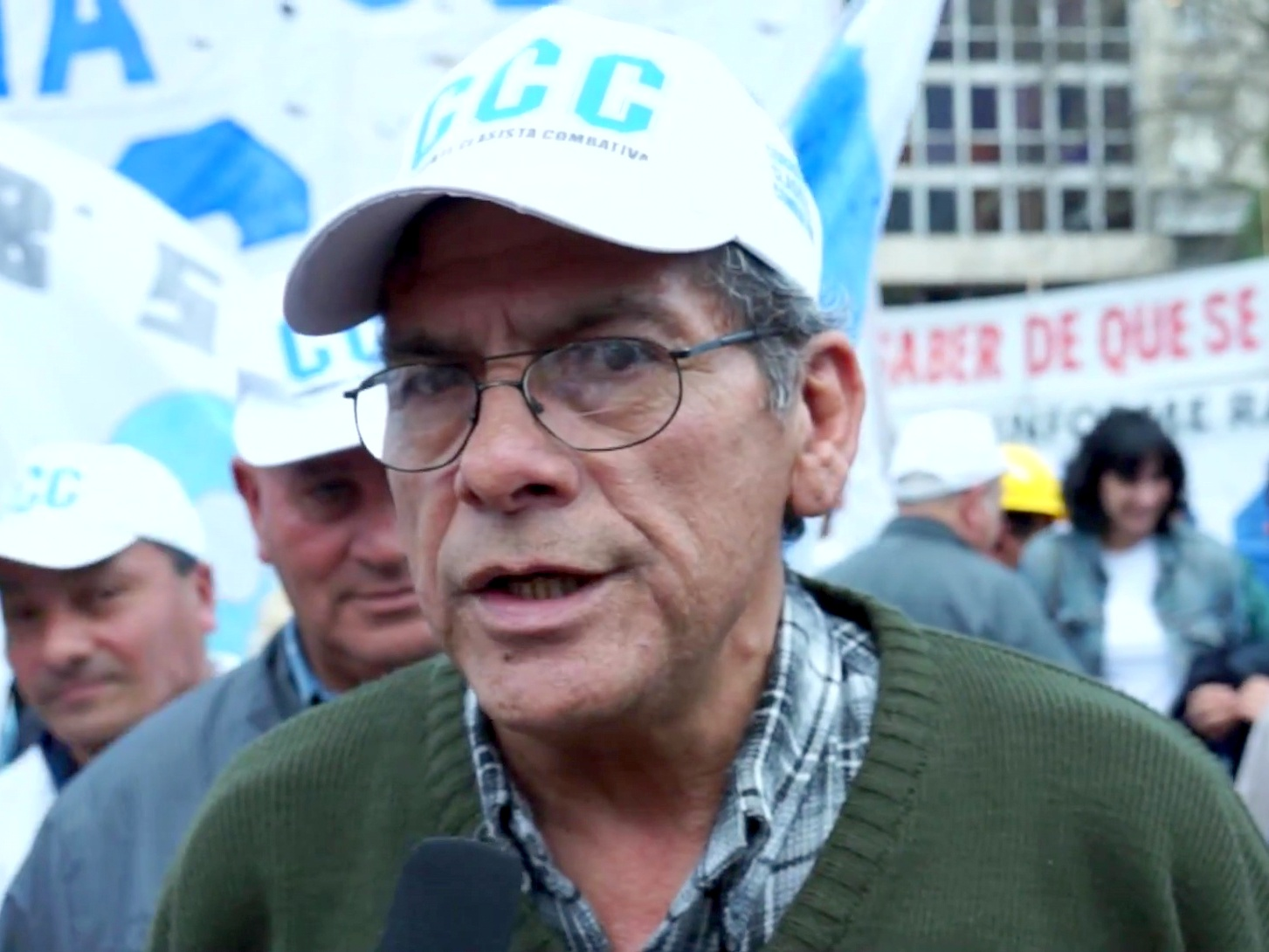

National Deputy
- In office 19 December 2019 – 10 December 2023
- Constituency: Buenos Aires

Personal details
- Born: 19 September 1952 (age 73) Salta, Argentina
- Party: Revolutionary Communist Party; Frente de Todos (2019–present)
- Profession: Trade unionist

Juan Carlos Alderete (born 19 September 1952) is an Argentine trade unionist, social activist and politician, and the leader of the Corriente Clasista y Combativa (CCC), the labour wing of the Revolutionary Communist Party. He rose to prominence in the late 1990s due to his role in the Piquetero movement.

From 2019 to 2023 he was a National Deputy representing Buenos Aires Province. He sat in the Frente de Todos bloc.

== Early and personal life ==
Alderete was born on 19 September 1952 in Salta, in Northeastern Argentina. His father was a CGT leader. The eighth of nine children, he dropped out of primary school when he was 9 years old. From an early age, he was a firm believer in the ideal of the Socialist revolution and admired Che Guevara. When he was 14, Alderete ran away from his home intending to go to Cuba and join the Revolution, but was ultimately stopped by his father in Tucumán. He moved to Buenos Aires aged 15, where he started working as a dishwasher in a restaurant in La Paternal.

He currently lives in Barrio María Elena, in La Matanza, which was initially an occupied territory.

== Career ==
=== Involvement in the CCC ===
In 1971, Alderete found a job at a dairy company and became involved with the local labour union. During the last military dictatorship in Argentina (1976–1983), Alderete was accused of attempting to kidnap a Ford executive's mother, for which he fled to his native Salta and stayed in one of his brothers' house. Upon returning to Buenos Aires six months later, he was captured by the authorities, and so he spent the following 7 years in the Caseros Prison. Upon being released in 1981, Alderete went to the María Elena settlement in La Matanza, where he would take up residence and join the effort by other residents to legitimize their land occupation. During the economic crisis of the late 1990s, Alderete organized soup kitchens alongside Luis D'Elía.

In November 2000, standing in opposition to the neoliberal economic program of President Fernando de la Rúa, Alderete and the CCC organized the first massive piquete on Route 3; the roadblock lasted 18 days. In 2008, during the agrarian strike, Alderete backed the "Mesa de Enlace" (the coalition of the country's four largest agrarian associations).

=== National Deputy ===
At the 2019 general election, Alderete was in the 23rd place in the Frente de Todos candidates list for the Argentine Chamber of Deputies in Buenos Aires Province; although he was not elected, he took office upon the resignation of Carlos Castagneto, who took up a position at AFIP. He took office on 19 December 2019. As a member of Congress, Alderete urged the Frente de Todos government of President Alberto Fernández to reinforce the Argentine state's social spending. In dissent with the government, Alderete abstained from voting in favor of the debt sustainability bill introduced by the Executive Power in January 2020.

== Electoral history ==
Electoral history of Juan Carlos Alderete
Election	Office	List	#	District	Votes			Result	Ref.
Election	Office	List	#	District	Total	%	P.	Result	Ref.
2019	National Deputy	Frente de Todos	23	Buenos Aires Province	5,113,359	52.64%	1st (Note: Presented on an electoral list. The data shown represents the share of the vote the entire party/alliance received in that constituency.)	Not elected (Note: Assumed office on 19 December 2019 following the resignation of Carlos Castagneto.)	
