= Guillermo Reinwick =

Argentinian businessman

Guillermo Reinwick is an Argentinian businessman who is implicated in the Boudougate scandal, which erupted in 2012.

He is the owner of a chain of cafés in Buenos Aires shopping malls, but became well known for his involvement in Boudougate. The son-in-law of one of the owners of Ciccone Calcográfica, Argentina's largest printing company, which was in deep debt and had been ordered to declare bankruptcy, Reinwick helped arrange meetings with Amado Boudou, then Minister of the Economy and later Vice President, that led to the purchase of 70% of the printing firm by a Dutch-registered company called The Old Fund, and to new government printing contracts. The Old Fund was later shown to be a shell company, and Reinwick, who had been identified as its controlling shareholder, was shown to be a front for Boudou and his business partner José María Nuñez Carmona.

In his earliest testimony in the Boudougate trial before Judge Ariel Lijo, Reinwick denied that the resurrection of the printing firm had involved any wrongdoing and that Boudou had anything to do with the firm's resurrection. In later testimony, however, Reinwick accused Boudou and Núñez Carmona of criminal activity while insisting that he himself had done nothing irregular. At first considered a witness in the trial, Reinwick was later named a defendant and charged by Lijo with bribery.

== Career ==
Reinwick began his career as part owner of a solarium in the district of San Martín. This was before his marriage to Maria Lorena Ciccone, the daughter of Nicolás Ciccone, whose family firm Ciccone Calcográfica was Argentina's largest printing company, printing Argentinian currency, passports, and other official documents.

Reinwick later became the part owner of a chain of cafés called Francesca that are located at various shopping centers in Buenos Aires: Patio Bullrich, Alto Palermo, Galerías Pacífico, and Dot Baires. His nickname is “El Cafatero”.

== Boudougate ==
Boudougate is a political scandal that broke in 2012. It centers on the complex and illegal financial scheme by means of which Argentina's largest printing firm, Ciccone Caligrafico, was resurrected after incurring a massive debt that led to a bankruptcy order in 2010. The bankruptcy order was reversed through the influence of Amado Boudou, then Minister of the Economy and later Vice President of Argentina, and 70% of the firm was acquired by a Dutch-registered company called The Old Fund. Renamed Compañía de Valores Sudamericana (American Securities Company), or CVS, the printing firm acquired new government contracts as a result of Boudou's contacts. It was later established that The Old Fund was a shell corporation and that its titular head, Alejandro Vandenbroele, and Reinwick, who was officially identified as its “controlling shareholder,” were fronts for Boudou and his business partner José María Núñez Carmona.

=== Testimony ===
Reinwick testified in the Boudougate trial of February 2012. In his testimony, Reinwick stated that the purchase of Ciccone Calcográfica by The Old Fund as a legitimate, above-board transaction, and denied that Amado Boudou had played any role in the resurrection of the printing firm, calling any suggestions to that effect “fabrications and lies.” Reinwick also accused the media of creating a “brutal pall of suspicion” around the company that threatened its survival. Reinwick stated that Vandenbroele was not the real owner of CVS, but maintained that Vandenbroele was its real director. Reinwick denied that any irregular activity had been involved in Vandenbroele's purchase of Ciccone, saying that Vandenbroele had merely “provided the legal structures necessary to achieve the lifting of the bankruptcy” and had arranged for “the necessary funding.”

After Reinwick's February testimony, La Politica Online questioned how Reinwick, a small-scale restaurateur, could, with the help of Vandenbroele and a few other minor business partners, have managed to reverse a debt situation on the scale that Ciccone Calcográfica had experienced.

In three hours of testimony given before Judge Ariel Lijo on December 3, 2013, Reinwick presented a radically new version of what had happened behind the scenes in the Ciccone Calcográfica case, making him suddenly, in the words of one newspaper, “a very controversial” witness.

In his new testimony, Reinwick disowned the testimony he had given in February 2012, and stated that Boudou was in fact the man behind the revival of Ciccone Calcográfica, and that he (Reinwick) and the Ciccone brothers had met with Boudou twice, first at the offices of Telefé and then at a restaurant in Puerto Madero.

Outlining the way in which he now claimed the plan to resurrect Ciccone Calcográfica had taken shape, Reinwick said that in July 2010, in an effort to help his father-in-law resurrect the firm, he had first approached his friend Claudio Belocopitt, owner of Swiss Medical, who put him in touch with Guillermo Moreno, who at the time was Argentina's Secretary of Domestic Commerce. Then one afternoon, according to Reinwick, he was at the home of a friend and neighbor, Gabriel Bianco, nicknamed “Budín” (Pudding), who was the former commercial director of Telefé and was also a childhood friend of Boudou's from Mar del Plata. Boudou, who at the time was Minister of the Economy, was reported to have visited Bianco that day.

As a result of that visit, a meeting was arranged at a coffee shop on the ground floor of the Hilton Hotel in Puerto Madero. The meeting was attended by Reinwick, Bianco, Nicolás Ciccone, and Núñez Carmona, who was introduced to the others as Boudou's secretary. Several days later, Bianco phoned Reinwick and offered to host a meeting between Nicolás Ciccone and Boudou at the offices of Telefé. Reinwick accompanied Ciccone to the meeting, and Boudou was accompanied by Núñez Carmona. The latter gave a chalkboard presentation explaining his idea for the resurrection of the printing firm. He said that he would arrange for the injection of funds into the firm, and that he and Boudou had to receive a stake, meaning that Ciccone would have to cede shares to them. When asked which company the shares would be transferred to, Núñez Carmona said that he would let them know later.

At some point, said Reinwick, Boudou explained to him and Ciccone that Núñez Carmona, acting on his behalf, was to be in charge of everything related to the printing firm. According to Reinwick, Boudou told him and Ciccone that talking to Núñez Carmona was “like talking to him.” Reinwick had earlier testified that he himself had hired Vandenbroele of his own volition. On December 3, however, Reinwick testified that it was Núñez Carmona who had placed Vandenbroele in charge of the firm, to act as a front man for Boudou and for Núñez Carmona himself. In his new testimony, Reinwick accused Núñez Carmona of making violent threats in order to compel him (Reinwick) to sign certain documents. Reinwick also represented himself as having had no involvement in any of the criminal activity he was describing and of having had nothing to do with determining or managing any of the activities that took place at the printing firm after Boudou entered the picture. On the contrary, Reinwick said, Núñez Carmona had been ultimately in charge, on Boudou's behalf, and Reinwick had signed papers, without knowing what they contained, in response to threats by Núñez Carmona.

It was widely noted that Reinwick's new testimony represented “a noticeable shift in the record.”

Boudou denied Reinwick's claim that he had met Reinwick and Ciccone at a restaurant in Puerto Madero. Speaking on radio, Boudou's lawyer Diego Pirota described Reinwick's testimony as “a lie” and “a scripted statement.”

=== Criminal charges ===
Prosecutor Jorge Di Lello officially charged Reinwick and Nicolás Ciccone with crimes in February 2014. On May 30, 2014, Judge Ariel Lijo ordered them to testify. Reinwick testified on June 12, 2014, this time not as a witness to other people's possible crimes but as a subject of investigation.

In a document addressed to Judge Lijo, submitted in May 2014 to supplement new testimony that he gave in the case, Reinwick stated that he did not understand why the prosecutor had filed charges against him, but said that “if this is the price I have to pay for having contributed a grain of sand to the uncovering of the most important facts about corruption in the Republic of Argentina during the last few years, then I accept.”

=== Comments to Jorge Lanata ===
Appearing on Jorge Lanata's television program Periodismo para todos in June 2014, with his lawyer Carlos Vela, Reinwick “sought to distance himself from the shady sale of the printing company to The Old Fund” and “made harsh accusations,” saying that the Argentinian government had stolen Ciccone Calcográfica and that after the outbreak of the Ciccone case in the media, Carmona Nuñez had told him: “If you play the Vice President, I'll go to your house and shoot you.” Reinwick stated that at the meeting in Telefé Ciccone had been “deceived with the lie that a foreign company would take care of the printing firm and the state itself ended up stealing the company.”

Explaining why he had approached Boudou in the first place, Reinwick told Lanata that Ciccone Calcográfica was unlike most other businesses in that it performed all of its work on contract for the Argentinian government. He said that it was one thing if a coffee business, such as his, went bankrupt, but 100% of Ciccone's activity was carried out for the Argentinian government, and for “that and no other reason” he considered it legitimate to try to seek help from public officials in resolving the firm's financial problems. He did not expect, he said, was that the government would then proceed to “steal the company.” Reinwick also told Lanata that on a day he had been scheduled to testify in court, his wife had given birth to their sixth child, a son, and had “lost much blood and almost died” in childbirth, but that he was so eager to get the facts out that he had testified anyway, even though his lawyer had told him that he had “reasonable grounds” to put off his court appearance.

=== Complaint against Núñez Carmona ===
It was reported on June 17, 2014, that Guillermo Reinwick had filed a new complaint against Núñez Carmona for allegedly having told him: “If you touch the Vice President, I'll set fire to your kid.” This accusation was handled as a separate case, under Federal Judge Marcelo Martinez De Giorgi. Reinwick stated in connection with the complaint that beginning in February 2012, Núñez Carmona had made a range of threats to him, saying, “We know where you live and that you have five children” and “You touch the Vice President and I'll go to your house and Pacheco will put a bullet in your son.”

=== Indictment ===
In a June 27, 2014, indictment, Judge Lijo charged that Boudou and his associates had conspired with the Ciccone family, including Reinwick, in a scheme designed to enrich all of the participants. Lijo described Reinwick and Nicolás Ciccone as having perpetrated an act of bribery, giving 70% of the printing firm to Boudou and his associates in exchange for an arrangement that they hoped would bring them profit.

Reinwick stated in late July 2014 that he and the Ciccone family had been “deceived” by the government and that he was “mortified” to be involved in anything with a person like Boudou.

=== Perjury charges ===
Reinwick and Nicolás Ciccone were accused of perjury by lawyers for Boudou and Núñez Carmona, who argued that the two men had lied to Judge Lijo in an effort to further their own economic interests. In May 2014, Federal Judge Luis Rodriguez was asked to examine the accusations and to determine whether Reinwick and his father-in-law should be formally charged with perjury. Federal prosecutor Ramiro Gonzalez requested that the charges be dismissed, on the grounds that Reinwick and Ciccone had gone from being witnesses to defendants and were therefore no longer under oath. Rodriguez dismissed the accusations, but in August 2014, Ramiro and Dario Rubinska, lawyers for Núñez Carmona, appealed his decision.

In November 2014, Federal prosecutor Germán Moldes endorsed the indictment of Reinwick and Ciccone by Judge Lijo.
