= Hernán Lorenzino =

Argentine lawyer and public policy maker

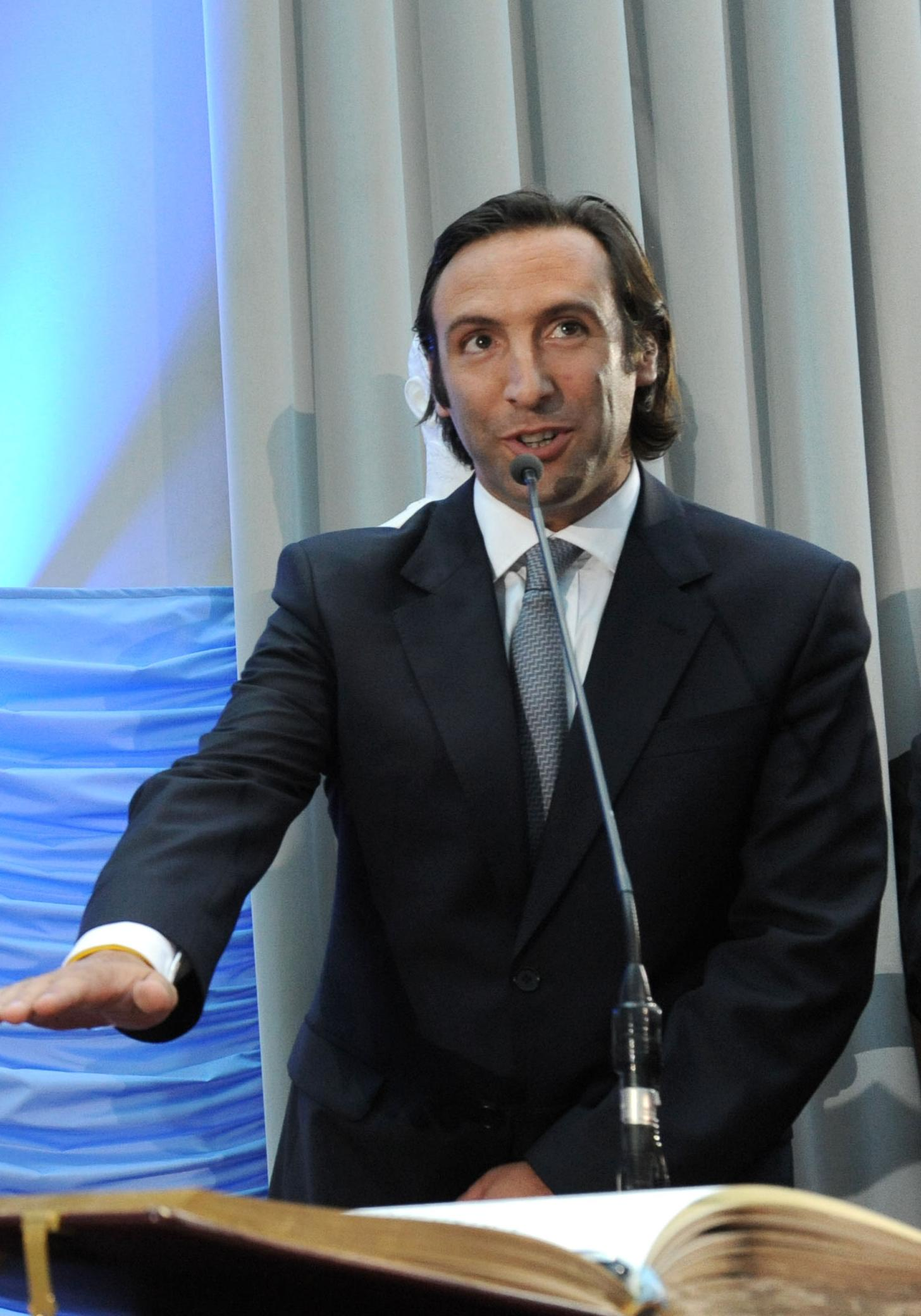

Minister of Economy of Argentina
- In office December 10, 2011 – November 18, 2013
- President: Cristina Fernández de Kirchner
- Preceded by: Amado Boudou
- Succeeded by: Axel Kicillof

Secretary of Finance
- In office April 25, 2008 – December 10, 2011
- President: Cristina Fernández de Kirchner
- Preceded by: Hugo Secondini
- Succeeded by: Adrián Cosentino

Personal details
- Born: March 5, 1972 (age 54) La Plata, Argentina
- Education: National University of La Plata Torcuato di Tella University

Hernán Gaspar Lorenzino (born March 5, 1972) is an Argentine lawyer and public policy maker. He was appointed Minister of Economy of Argentina by President Cristina Kirchner in 2011.

== Life and times ==
Lorenzino was born in La Plata. His family moved to Puerto Madryn, Chubut Province, in 1974, and Lorenzino was raised in the coastal Patagonia city. He met his future wife there, and together they enrolled at the National University of La Plata, where Lorenzino earned a Law degree and a master's degree in public finance; he later earned a master's degree in Economics at Torcuato di Tella University.

He was appointed Provincial Director of Funding Policy and Public Credit for the Province of Buenos Aires by Governor Felipe Solá in 2004, during which tenure he managed the redemption of the remaining Patacón bonds issued as complementary currency by Governor Carlos Ruckauf during the 2001 crisis.

Following the end of Solá's administration in 2007, Lorenzino was appointed Financial Representative for Argentina in Washington, D.C. The resignation of Economy Minister Martín Lousteau amid the 2008 Argentine government conflict with the agricultural sector in April, led to Lorenzino's appointment as Secretary of Finance for the new Economy Minister, the more conciliatory Carlos Rafael Fernández. Lorenzino managed the second phase of the Argentine debt restructuring in this capacity; its first phase had been initiated in 2005 by Economy Minister Roberto Lavagna, and had resulted in the renegotiation of two-thirds of the US$82 billion in sovereign bonds defaulted in 2001. The second phase, involving the renegotiation of US$18 billion in bonds retained by holdouts from the 2005 exchange, was completed in June 2010. Holders of two-thirds of this latter tranche accepted the offer prepared by Lorenzino, and the proportion of bonds rescued from default thus rose to over 92%.

Lorenzino also served in La graN maKro, a center-left economic and social policy think tank closely allied with Kirchnerism. Enjoying a good working relationship with Economy Minister Amado Boudou, Lorenzino was nominated to replace him when the latter was elected Vice President of Argentina in President Cristina Kirchner's landslide, 2011 reelection. Lorenzino was, moreover, the most pragmatic major official in Boudou's team with regards to the international bond market and the Paris Club of creditors, and the Minister-designate subsequently announced that debt restructuring would be acquire a greater policy relevance during his tenure.

An April 2013 interview by Greek journalist Eleni Varvitsioti resulted in a stir when Lorenzino refused to answer a question regarding Argentine inflation; unbeknownst to him, the microphones were left on and recorded him saying me quiero ir ("I want to leave"). He then departed, leaving the interview unfinished, baffling both the local and the international press.

Lorenzino's tenure was marked by ongoing efforts to counter vulture fund lawsuits to obtain payment at face value on nearly US$1.5 billion of bonds bought for pennies on the dollar. The Argentine offer prepared by Lorenzino, based on his successful 2010 restructuring, would give the largest of the vulture funds, Caymans-based NML Capital Limited, a 284% return; NML had filed injunctions in U.S. courts to attach future payments to other bondholders by way of forcing Argentina to settle and thus obtain returns of up to 1380%.

Cristina Kirchner appointed Axel Kicillof as the new minister of economy on November 18, 2013. Lorenzino was sent in a task force to negotiate the Argentine debt restructuring.

== Controversies ==
=== Inflation interview (2013) ===
In April 2013, during an interview with Greek journalist Eleni Varvitsioti for a television documentary, Lorenzino interrupted the report when asked about inflation. Off camera —though with the microphone on— he was heard saying “I want to leave”. The episode received wide coverage in local and international media.

=== Debate over statistics and INDEC ===
During his tenure, public debate intensified over the measurement of prices and economic growth by INDEC. On 1 February 2013, the executive board of the International Monetary Fund issued a declaration of censure against Argentina for the lack of accuracy in inflation and GDP data, an unprecedented measure in the organization's history up to that point. Years later, in November 2016, the IMF lifted the declaration after assessing methodological changes in official statistics. In parallel, statements by the minister defending the validity of official statistics reignited discussion in media and interviews.

=== Statements on “economic terrorism” (2013) ===
In May 2013, Lorenzino criticized economists and market analysts whom he accused of promoting “acts of economic terrorism” in the context of debates on expectations and inflation. His comments drew both criticism and support from different sectors.

=== Strategy toward holdouts ===
During 2012 and 2013, the country's legal strategy toward creditors that did not enter the debt exchanges was debated. Some media coverage questioned the approach taken by the economic team; the minister publicly defended Argentina's position before U.S. courts.

=== Complaints and legal filings ===
In 2013 he was mentioned, along with other officials, in court filings brought by private parties challenging economic policy decisions; these complaints were processed in federal courts and formed part of widely publicized cases.
