= Carlos Castagneto =

Argentine footballer and politician

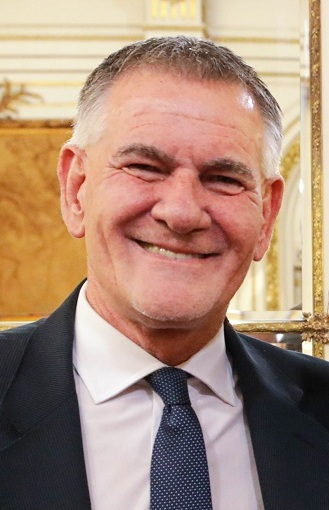

National Deputy
- Incumbent
- Assumed office 10 December 2023
- Constituency: Buenos Aires
- In office 10 December 2015 – 10 December 2019
- Constituency: Buenos Aires

Federal Administrator of Public Income
- In office 29 July 2022 – 10 December 2023
- President: Alberto Fernández
- Preceded by: Mercedes Marcó del Pont
- Succeeded by: Florencia Misrahi

General Director of Social Security Resources
- In office 11 December 2019 – 29 July 2022
- Preceded by: Guillermo Ramírez
- Succeeded by: Mara Ruiz Malec

Personal details
- Born: 1 November 1960 (age 65) La Plata, Argentina
- Party: Kolina
- Other political affiliations: Front for Victory (2010–2015); Frente de Todos (2019–2023); Union for the Homeland (since 2023)

Carlos Daniel Castagneto (born 1 November 1960) is an Argentine politician and former football goalkeeper who played for clubs in Argentina, Chile, Paraguay, Peru and Colombia. Since 2023 he has been a National Deputy representing Buenos Aires Province, as a member of the Kolina party; he previously held the position from 2015 to 2019.

From 2022 to 2023, he was head of the Federal Administration of Public Income (AFIP).

== Football career ==
Castagneto made his senior debut with Gimnasia y Esgrima de La Plata in a league match against Club Atlético Temperley on 11 December 1982.

=== Teams ===
- (Argentina) Gimnasia y Esgrima de La Plata 1980-1984
- (Argentina) Temperley 1985
- (Argentina) Defensores de Belgrano 1986
- (Colombia) Atlético Bucaramanga 1987
- (Argentina) San Lorenzo 1988
- (Argentina) Quilmes 1989-1991
- (Peru) Sporting Cristal 1991
- (Chile) Deportes La Serena 1992
- (Paraguay) Guarani 1993

=== Titles ===
- (Argentina) Gimnasia y Esgrima de La Plata 1984 (Primera B Nacional Championship)
- (Peru) Sporting Cristal 1991 (Peruvian Primera División Championship)

== Electoral history ==
Electoral history of Carlos Castagneto
Election	Office	List	#	District	Votes			Result	Ref.
Election	Office	List	#	District	Total	%	P.	Result	Ref.
2015	National Deputy	Front for Victory	9	Buenos Aires Province	3,354,619	37.28%	1st (Note: Presented on an electoral list. The data shown represents the share of the vote the entire party/alliance received in that constituency.)	Elected	
2019	National Deputy	Frente de Todos	15	Buenos Aires Province	5,113,359	52.64%	1st	Elected	
2023	National Deputy	Union for the Homeland	9	Buenos Aires Province	4,094,665	43.71%	1st	Elected	
