= Alejandro Vandenbroele =

Argentinian-Belgian lawyer and businessman

Alejandro Paul Vandenbroele is an Argentinian-Belgian lawyer and businessman who is a leading figure in the Argentinian financial scandal known both as Boudougate and as “Caso Ciccone,” which happened in February 2012. As president of a Dutch-based firm called The Old Fund, he has been accused of being a front man for Argentinian Vice President Amado Boudou and for Boudou's business partner Núñez Carmona in a purported scheme involving the purchase and control of the printing house Ciccone Calcografica, later known as Compañía de Valores Sudamericana (American Securities Company), or CVS, which printed banknotes and documents for the government of Argentina.

The public comments and testimony of Vandenbroele's wife, Laura Muñoz, played a major role in exposing the Boudougate scandal and in incriminating Vandenbroele and other principals. In addition to being tried in Argentina, Vandenbroele was also wanted in Uruguay on charges of money laundering.

== Career ==
=== 2008 ===
Vandenbroele first appeared in business records in March 2008 as a shareholder in Madrid-based Agroibérica de Inversiones SA, a firm purportedly involved in the “production, distribution, import and export of food and drinks.”

=== 2009 ===
In 2009, he became a shareholder in Buenos Aires-based Ruta Sur Rentals SA, which rents out motorhomes, RVs, and other vehicles and has German and Dutch owners.

=== 2010 ===
In July 2010, the Argentinian tax agency, the Administración Federal de Ingresos Públicos (AFIP), called on Calcográfica Ciccone to declare bankruptcy. Calcográfica Ciccone was one of Argentina's most important printers, “often working for the state on such sensitive issues as the printing of banknotes, identity documents, and passports,” and owed the national treasury 239 million pesos.

Two months later, with backing from Amado Boudou, who at the time was Economy Minister, the AFIP reversed itself and allowed Ciccone to refinance its debt. A Netherlands-based corporation named The Old Fund, described by Clarín as a “mysterious company,” whose only public face was Vandenbroele, thereupon invested 2.3 million pesos in Ciccone, and Vandenbroele assumed the presidency of what became known as the “new” Ciccone, the name of which was eventually changed to Compañía de Valores Sudamericana (American Securities Company), or CVS. The Old Fund owned 70% of the “new” Ciccone, of which it officially took control on October 29, 2010, two days after the death of Néstor Kirchner. One of the founders of the company, Nicholas Ciccone, and the two daughters of his deceased brother, Hector, owned 30%.

A 2014 report indicated that The Old Fund was incorporated in 2008 by two Argentinians, Eduardo Alberto Razzetti and Carlos Fabian Dorado and that Vandenbroele took control of the firm as a shareholder in or shortly prior to September 2010. In that same month, according to the same 2014 report, a firm called London Supply contributed $1.8 million to The Old Fund, one of whose shareholders at the time was Michelangelo Castilian, a longtime friend of Boudou and Núñez Carmona. Vandenbroele officially became president of CVS on October 21, 2010, with Jose María Capirone, a former partner of Núñez Carmona and Boudou, serving as his second-in-command, and assumed the presidency of the Old Fund on November 17, 2010. In that same month, Vandenbroele became deputy director, owner, and president of The Old Fund, another shareholder in which was Sergio Gustavo Martinez, a fugitive from justice in the United States. At around the same time, The Old Fund was paid $7.8 million for alleged technical consultation for the government of Taiwan in regard to an exchange of public debt with Argentina, a matter in which Boudou was a central player. This report stated that The Old Fund spent 567,000 pesos to reverse the bankruptcy of Calcográfica Ciccone and that Núñez Carmona, according to Vandenbroele's wife, had represented The Old Fund in discussions with the creditors of Ciccone, whom he had persuaded to allow The Old Fund to take over that firm.

It was noted by several news media that in 2010, immediately prior to his involvement in The Old Fund and Calcográfica Ciccone, Vandenbroele was listed in Argentinian tax rolls as a self-employed person or small-business proprietor in the very lowest tax bracket.

=== 2012 ===
These dealings began to erupt into a public scandal in February 2012. On February 24, prosecutor Carlos Rivolo traveled to Mendoza where he interviewed Vandenbroele's wife, Laura Muñoz, about her husband's connections to Boudou and Boudou's business partner José María Núñez Carmona. She told Rivolo that her husband was a front man for Boudou and provided Rivolo with documents and an audio tape of conversations between her and Vandenbroele. Muñoz said that her husband and Núñez Carmona ran a “ghost consultancy” in Puerto Madero that handled “money bribes” and that was a front for Boudou. Muñoz also told Rivolo that she had argued with her husband about the illegality of these activities and about his insistence that they move from Buenos Aires to Mendoza because of these activities. The audiotapes contained evidence of these arguments. Muñoz, who had been married to Vandenbroele since 2006, said that she had begun to suspect him of cheating, and while looking through his papers for evidence of an affair, she discovered documents outlining his relationship to Boudou and Núñez Carmona.

Vandenbroele reportedly had known Boudou since their youth in Mar del Plata, where Boudou, in his teens, had dated Vandenbroele's cousin Guadalupe Escaray. As of 2012, Escaray was working under Boudou as regional chef of ANSES, the Argentinian social-security administration. When confronted with Muñoz's claims about her husband's business connections to Boudou, Boudou stated they were “all lies.” On April 4, 2012, the Justice Department raided an apartment owned by Boudou in Puerto Madero, and found evidence that the home expenses, including rent and cable bills, were paid by Vandenbroele, indicating that he was residing there. The raid, which was ordered by federal judge Daniel Rafecas at the request of Rívolo, established a firm link between Boudou and Vandenbroele.

On April 22, it was reported that Vandenbroele was under investigation for money laundering in Spain. On May 12, it was reported that phone service at the Puerto Madero apartment was in Vandenbroele's name. On May 13, La Nación confirmed that Vandenbroele was living in the apartment. Boudou, however, denied knowing him. On May 14, Federal prosecutor Jorge Di Lello called for Boudou, José María Núñez Carmona, Vandenbroele, and Boudou's domestic partner, Agustina Kämpfer, to be investigated for embezzlement, in addition to 10 companies, including The Old Fund.

A June 3, 2012, report in La Nación outlined details of a Ciccone Calcográfica contract to print money for the national mint, and suggested that money laundering was involved. A June 14 article in the same newspaper noted that Alejandro Vandenbroele was “the only face” of The Old Fund and that the origin of its assets was a mystery. On June 25, La Nación reported that the price charged by Calcográfica Ciccone to print money was higher than prices offered by other companies. On June 26, it was reported that a Uruguayan court had begun investigating CVS, and that The Old Fund owned a firm called Dusbel SA, which had been founded by Uruguayan accountant Fernando Castagno Schickendantz, who had then sold it to an Argentinian firm before its acquisition by The Old Fund. On July 4 came a report that Ariel Lijo, the judge who was investigating the Ciccone Case, had asked the government agency Unidad de Información Financiera (UIF) for a document from Spain containing information about Vandenbroele's financial actions.

On August 21, La Nación reported on a “key document” signed on the previous June 13 by Boudou, Vandenbroele, and the apparent “controlling shareholder” of The Old Fund, Guillermo Reinwick, whereby Vandenbroele agreed to act on Reinwick's behalf “to try to salvage the former Ciccone” and thereby protect the firm from government investigation. According to La Nación, Reinwick had signed this agreement under pressure, and had also taken responsibility for the two companies that the newspaper described as being “behind The Old Fund: the Dutch fund Tierras International Investments CV, later replaced by a US firm called LLC, and the Uruguayan firm Dusbel SA.”

The operation of CVS was taken over by the government in August 2012, and was placed under the direct control of the Minister of Economy, Hernán Lorenzino, and the head of the Mint, Katya Daura, both of whom reported to Boudou.

In November 2012, Vandenbroele filed a document before the Criminal Court in which he claimed that Raul Moneta, a banker connected with the Kirchner administration, had financed the entire Ciccone operation. In response, Moneta “opted for public silence.”

=== 2013 ===
Diario Veloz reported on January 6, 2013, that officials were tracing the origins of Vandenbroele's money, and that “all roads lead to the tax havens of Panama and the Isles [sic] of Man.”

Appearing in Commercial Court in April 2013, Vandenbroele accused the government of wanting to destroy the Ciccone printing firm and to take it over unconstitutionally. Vandenbroele complained that the government intervention in the printing business had caused “a severe decline” in its income.

As of June 1, 2013, Vandenbroele was living in a private neighborhood, Vistalba, and was not paying alimony to Muñoz. In an October 2013 interview, Muñoz described Boudou as “an immoral man and a liar.” According to her, Vandenbroele had always “derided Boudou,” never spoken of him with respect, and invariably viewed him as a man who obtained things illicitly. It was reported on October 20, 2013, that a case against “Boudou and others” for illegal enrichment was on the desk of Judge Lijo, and that the “others” included Núñez Carmona, Kampfer, and Vandenbroele, as well as Juan Carlos López, Sandra Viviana Rizzo, Fabián Hugo Carosso, Hugo Nicolás Carosso, and Pable Pellet Lastra.

The Court of Cassation ruled on November 1, 2013, that Vandenbroele's alleged role as a front man for Boudou should be investigated, and gave particular weight to Muñoz's testimony. Muñoz told Clarin she was happy with the ruling, especially given that the Kirchner administration and Boudou in particular had tried to discredit her, calling her “insane” and a “compulsive liar”. Muñoz said that she had been offered money to retract her statement that her ex-husband was a front man for Boudou, and that she was now celebrating the fact that “justice was done with my truths.” She also said that Vandenbroele had threatened to kill her “like a dog” so that she would end up “dead in a ditch,” or to commit her to a mental hospital so that “no one will believe you.”

It was reported on November 2, 2013, that the bank accounts of Dusbel, Vandenbroele's company in Uruguay, had been frozen by Uruguayan Judge Néstor Valetti at the request of prosecutor Juan Gomez.

In mid November, Vandenbroele was banned from leaving the country before May 5, 2014.

=== 2014 ===
In early February 2014, Laura Muñoz told Radio Mitre that she did not regret having stated two years earlier that Vandenbroele was Boudou's front man. She also maintained that he had traveled to Chile at a time when he was banned from leaving the country. In addition, she accused him of “kidnapping” their daughter and said it was “crazy” that a judge could consider him to be “a responsible parent.” She said that he was surrounded by admirers, stating that “even my mother and many parents of classmates of my daughter, to those who really like this Government, have become fans of Vandenbroele.” She called Vandenbroele “a violent man” and claimed he had beaten his mother.

Boudou reiterated on February 26, 2014, that he did not know or have any contact with Vandenbroele. “I don't know him, I didn't show him anything, I never met him,” he said. He asserted that Vandenbroele was living in his apartment because their mutual acquaintance Fabián Carosso Donatiello had transferred it to him.

In late May 2014, Lijo issued summonses in the Ciccone Case, ordering Boudou, Vandenbroele, and others to testify in July, addressing charges that they had engaged in irregularities not only while Boudou was Minister of Economy, but also during his term as Vice President. Also called to testify were Núñez Carmona, former AFIP official Rafael Resnick Brenner, Nicholas Ciccone, and Guillermo Reinwick. Muñoz said on May 30 that she felt “relief” upon learning that Judge Ariel Lijo had summoned Boudou and Vandenbroele for questioning, because this indicated to her that “they are looking for the truth.” On June 11, Vandenbroele filed a brief with Lijo asking him to delay the trial. Lijo refused.

On June 26, 2014, La Nación reported that Vandenbroele had traveled to Brazil in 2011 with Guido Forcieri and Núñez Carmona. On June 27, the trial of Boudou, Núñez Carmona, Vandenbroele, and Resnick Brenner before Judge Lijo got underway, and all the defendants asked Lijo to delay the trial, a request he rejected. Lijo also prohibited all the defendants, except for Boudou, from leaving the country. In addition, he ruled that it had been established as a fact that Boudou and Núñez Carmona had bought Ciccone through The Old Fund with the objective of profiting from government printing contracts that Boudou would be able to arrange because of his official position. Muñoz said she felt relief upon hearing Lijo's ruling and that “for two and a half years I've been maintaining a truth that nobody believed...They did everything to make me look crazy. Finally the court agreed with me.”

La Nación reported on June 29, 2014, that Federal Judge Ariel Lijo had concluded that Boudou and Vandenbroele knew each other, despite Boudou's frequent and unequivocal claims to the contrary, and that they had a “strong link” and “mutual interests.” Lijo cited a substantial list of established facts demonstrating their relationship. Lijo concluded that “the links between Amado Boudou and Alejandro Vandenbroele are strong and numerous.”

La Nación reported on July 7, 2014, that Vandenbroele had appeared in Commercial Court No. 8 on September 3, 2010, in an effort to help reverse the bankruptcy of Ciccone. After the Ciccone scandal broke, however, the court verified that Vandenbroele had misrepresented information before the Commercial Court in 2010.

Lijo stated on July 11, 2014, that Vandenbroele had indeed been a front man for Boudou and Núñez Carmona, and tried them all on charges of bribery and irregular negotiations. He noted that Núñez Carmona and Boudou had both become millionaires as a result of their joint activities, while Vandenbroele lost money. As of 2011, Vandenbroele had a negative net worth of $235,324.

On June 11, 2014, he appeared in court, where his indictment was read and he was shown the evidence against him. Vandenbroele told the judge he wanted to answer questions later and expand his statement, and left a letter outlining the main points of his defense.

The court ruled in late June 2014 that Boudou and Núñez Carmona had acquired Ciccone Calcográfica while Boudou was Minister of Economy via The Old Fund and Vandenbroele, “with the ultimate goal of contracting with the Federal Government to print money and official documentation.” The court determined that Boudou, using his position as a public official, and Núñez Carmona had arranged with Nicholas and Hector Ciccone and Guillermo Reinwick for a transfer of 70% of Calcográfica Ciccone in exchange for actions arranged by Boudou that would enable the firm to resume operations and obtain government contracts.

La Nación reported on October 2, 2014, that Vandenbroele was under investigation by Valetti, the Uruguayan judge, on suspicion of money-laundering and that Valetti planned to ask for Vandenbroele's extradition so that Vandenbroele could explain the origin of funds that were transferred from Montevideo to Buenos Aires and used to acquire Ciccone. The report in La Nación further stated that Vandenbroele, as head of the anonymous Uruguayan firm Dusbel, had invested US$2.4 million in The Old Fund.

== Personal life ==
Vandenbroele and Muñoz married in 2006. They have one child together, and she has two children from a previous marriage. In March 2010, he moved out of their home.
