= José María Nuñez Carmona =

Argentinian businessman

José María Nuñez Carmona is an Argentinian businessman and entrepreneur who is a business partner and close friend of Amado Boudou, the Vice President of Argentina. He is one of the principals in the Boudougate scandal, which has been described by the Argentina Independent as “a messy tangle of crossed accusations.” The case involves the printing firm Calcográfica Ciccone, which has done many printing jobs for the Argentinian government, including the printing of money. The firm was bought in September 2010 by The Old Fund, a company run by Núñez Carmona's friend Alejandro Vandenbroele, and it was charged that Vandenbroele was in fact a front for Boudou and Núñez Carmona, with the latter acting as a middleman in the secret acquisition of the printing firm, whose name was changed after the purchase to Compañía de Valores Sudamericana (CVS).

Núñez Carmona is nicknamed “Nariga.”

== Early life and education ==
He attended Instituto Arzobispo José Antonio de San Alberto in Mar del Plata, where he was a classmate and close friend of Boudou.

== Career ==
Beginning in 1997, he and Boudou owned a real-estate firm called Inversiones Inmobiliarias Aspen. He and Boudou were also partners in a firm called Habitat Natural. This firm, established on August 4, 2010, was purportedly involved in the “construction, alteration and repair of buildings.” According to a 2011 news report by Jorge Lanata, the firm was not known to have actually been involved in any construction or other activities as of that date, but in March 2011 its capital stock increased in value from 40,000 to 720,000 pesos.

Núñez Carmona also owned a firm called Action Media, which earned a great deal of money from government advertising. Founded in October 2005 by Sandra Rizzo and Cesar Forcieli, the firm made nearly a million dollars in ad income from Telam, the Argentinian government's official news agency. Núñez Carmon was tried for attempting to bribe a manager of Telam in 2008, but was acquitted.

Beginning in 2005, Nuñez Carmona organized a series of rock festivals in Mar del Plata called Rock & Arena.

Boudou and Núñez Carmona are said to be “drinking buddies” as well as business partners. “They are so close,” reported La Nación, “that when Boudou bought an apartment on River View in Puerto Madero, Núñez Carmona bought one a few floors away; when one of them bought a Harley Davidson, the other did, too.” Both men also owned apartments close to each other in San Lorenzo in Mar del Plata.

== Legal activity ==
=== Boudougate ===
The printing firm Calcográfica Ciccone, which routinely printed banknotes, passports, and various documents for the Argentinian government, was asked by the Argentinian tax authorities in July 2010 to declare bankruptcy, given that it owed a debt of 239 million pesos to the state treasury. In September, however, the firm was allowed to refinance its debt; in October, it received an investment of 2.3 million pesos from a Dutch-based company, The Old Fund, which thereupon acquired 70% of the firm, whose name was changed to Compañía de Valores Sudamericana (American Securities Company), or CVS. It was later revealed, in a 2014 report, that The Old Fund, whose public face was Núñez Carmona's friend Alejandro Vandenbroele, had received $1.8 million in September 2010 from a firm called London Supply, one of whose shareholders was Michelangelo Castilian, a longtime friend of Boudou and Núñez Carmona, and that Vandenbroele's second-in-command at CVS was Jose María Capirone, a former business partner of Núñez Carmona and Boudou. According to Vandenbroele's wife, Núñez Carmona represented The Old Fund in discussions with Ciccone's creditors aimed at securing their approval for the takeover by The Old Fund.

The Boudougate scandal had not yet fully erupted when El Urgente reported on August 25, 2011, that Núñez Carmona, who had previously been identified as a friend of Boudou, had now proven himself also to be a business partner of Boudou, who at the time was Argentina's Economy Minister and candidate for the Vice Presidency. Although the full extent of Boudou's role in the purchase of Calcográfica Ciccone was still not known to the public, El Urgente summed up what was then known about Núñez Carmona's role in the matter, and stated that because of the whiff of scandal touching Boudou via Núñez Carmona, the latter had “become a problem for Cristina Fernández.”

The Boudougate scandal fully erupted after prosecutor Carlos Rivolo's February 24, 2012, interview with Vandenbroele's wife, Laura Muñoz, about her husband's connections to Boudou and Núñez Carmona. She told Rivolo that her husband and Núñez Carmona ran a “ghost consultancy” in Puerto Madero that handled “money bribes” and that was a front for Boudou. Although Boudou rejected these charges, an April 4, 2012, raid on an apartment owned by Boudou established his connection to Vandenbroele. On May 14, Federal prosecutor Jorge Di Lello called for Boudou, Núñez Carmona, Vandenbroele, and Boudou's domestic partner, Agustina Kämpfer, to be investigated for embezzlement, in addition to 10 companies, including The Old Fund. It was reported on October 20, 2013, that a case against “Boudou and others” for illegal enrichment was on the desk of Judge Lijo, and that the “others” included Núñez Carmona, Kampfer, and Vandenbroele, as well as Juan Carlos López, Sandra Viviana Rizzo, Fabián Hugo Carosso, Hugo Nicolás Carosso, and Pable Pellet Lastra.

On June 10, 2014, Núñez Carmona was supposed to testify in the Calcográfica Ciccone case, but informed the court through his lawyers that he was not in Buenos Aires and would therefore not be able to testify. The inquest was therefore postponed, although no new date was set. On June 12, Núñez Carmona again failed to show up in court to testify in the case, and Judge Lijo warned him in writing that if he did not appear for an inquest on June 19, he would order his immediate arrest and an international arrest warrant. It was reported on July 15 that Núñez Carmona had been in Málaga, Spain, since the preceding day, July 14, and planned to be there through August 6, on a trip whose purposes were unknown. On June 16, Jorge Lanata reported on Periodismo para todos that Núñez Carmona was, in fact, in Uruguay, having traveled to Montevideo on June 6.

It was reported on June 17 that Guillermo Reinwick had filed a new complaint, stating that Núñez Carmona had told him: “If you touch the Vice President, I'll set fire to your kid.” This accusation, which Reinwick had first made in testimony before Judge Lijo in the Ciccone case, was being handled as a separate case by Federal Judge Marcelo Martinez De Giorgi. According to Reinwick, Núñez Carmona had made various threats to him beginning in February 2012, saying, “We know where you live and that you have five children” and “You touch the Vice President and I'll go to your house and Pacheco will put a bullet in your son.”

On June 24, 2014, Núñez Carmona appeared in court, where he was scheduled to be questioned by Federal Judge Ariel Lijo. But he refused to testify, purportedly because he had not had sufficient time to prepare his defense. He had previously failed twice to make scheduled court appearances.

On June 26, 2014, La Nación reported that Núñez Carmona, Vandenbroele, and Guido Forcieri had traveled to Brazil together in 2011. On June 27, the trial of Boudou, Núñez Carmona, Vandenbroele, and Resnick Brenner before Judge Lijo got underway, and all the defendants asked Lijo to delay the trial, a request he rejected. Lijo also prohibited all the defendants, except for Boudou, from leaving the country. In addition, he ruled that it had been established as a fact that Boudou and Núñez Carmona had bought Ciccone through The Old Fund with the objective of profiting from government printing contracts that Boudou would be able to arrange because of his official position.

On July 10, Boudou appealed the prosecution; the next day, Núñez Carmona did the same.

Lijo stated on July 11, 2014, that he had determined that Vandenbroele had indeed been a front man for Boudou and Núñez Carmona, and tried them all on charges of bribery and irregular negotiations. He noted that Núñez Carmona and Boudou had both become millionaires as a result of their joint activities, while Vandenbroele lost money. The court ruled in late June 2014 that Boudou and Núñez Carmona had acquired Ciccone Calcográfica while Boudou was Minister of Economy via The Old Fund and Vandenbroele, “with the ultimate goal of contracting with the Federal Government to print money and official documentation.” The court determined that Boudou, using his position as a public official, and Núñez Carmona had arranged with Nicholas and Hector Ciccone and Guillermo Reinwick for a transfer of 70% of Calcográfica Ciccone in exchange for actions arranged by Boudou that would enable the firm to resume operations and obtain government contracts.

It was reported on September 4, 2014, that an appeal in the Ciccone case would take place on October 7 before Judge Lijo, with Boudou, Núñez Carmona, Nicolás Ciccone, Guillermo Reinwick, Rafael Resnick Brenner, and Vandenbroele being tried for charges of bribery and business activities incompatible with public office.

=== Gabella perjury lawsuit ===
Guillermo Gabella, the director and shareholder of the Boldt printing firm, stated that after The Old Fund bought Ciccone, Núñez Carmona demanded “on behalf of Boudou” that Boldt return equipment that it had rented from Ciccone. Núñez Carmona denied this charge, and sued Gabella for perjury.

=== WSM lawsuit ===
On November 11, 2013, it was reported that an old friend of Núñez Carmona from Mar del Plata, Luis Scolari, who had founded the WSM public-relations firm with Boudou and Núñez Carmora, had accused him of improperly receiving public funds by billing the state for WSM's services. The case was handled by Judge Diejo Slupsky and prosecutor Viviana Fein.
