= César Guido Forcieri =

Argentine lawyer & economist

Cesar Forcieri
- Occupations: Lawyer, businessman, economist, and politician
- Years active: 1985-present

César Guido Forcieri is an Argentine lawyer, economist, politician, and businessman. He is currently the Executive Director for Argentina, Bolivia, Chile, Paraguay, Peru, and Uruguay at The World Bank.

Forcieri has been described as the right-hand man of Amado Boudou, a leading member of the circle surrounding Argentinian President Cristina Kirchner. Boudou ran ANSES, Argentina’s national social-security administration, from 2008-2009, the country’s Minister of the Economy from 2009-2011, and became Vice President of Argentina in December 2011. Both Boudou and Forcieri were investigated for corruption in early 2014 as part of the scandal known as “Boudougate.”

== Early life and education ==
Forcieri attended Colegio De La Salle from 1985 to 1997 and earned a bachelor's degree. He attended Universidad Argentina de la Empresa from 2002 to 2006 and earned a degree in law. He attended Universidad del CEMA from 2007 to 2008 and earned a master's degree in Law and Finance.

From 2013-2014 he attended Georgetown University and received a Certificate in International Business Management.

== Career ==
From 2006 to 2010, Forcieri held various offices at ANSES (Administración Nacional de la Seguridad Social), the Argentinian national social-security administration, including positions in the Technical and Administrative Department, Acquisitions and Public Contracts Office, and Wealth Fund for the Pension System (Fondo de Garantia de Sustentabilidad para el Sistema Integrado Previsional Argentino). He served as Liaison Manager of ANSES from May 2009 through April 2010.

In 2008, Forcieri formed the corporation Rock Argentina SA, which purportedly provides artistic and advertising services.

In May 2010, he was named Acting Chief of Staff at the Argentine Ministry of Economy and Public Finances, and was confirmed as Chief of Staff in August of that year. He was a Director of Quickfood SA in Buenos Aires from March 2010 to March 2011, and Undersecretary of Financial Services at the Argentinian Ministry of Economy and Public Finances from December 2011 to October 2012. He was a Director of Grupo Financiero Galicia S.A. in Buenos Aires from April 2011 to January 2013, having been appointed by Amado Boudou, then President Cristina Fernández de Kirchner’s Minister of Economy, to represent the interests of the State rather than those of private shareholders. From May 2010 to March 2014 he was G-20 Finance Deputy for Argentina at the Argentinian Ministry of Economy and Public Finances.

Since November 2012, Forcieri has been Executive Director for Argentina, Bolivia, Chile, Paraguay, Peru, and Uruguay at The World Bank in Washington, D.C.

== Corruption charges and Boudougate ==
Argentinian Congresswoman Elisa Carrió and Buenos Aires legislator Maximiliano Ferraro asked the Anti-Corruption Bureau in March 2012 to investigate Forcieri on charges of “conflicts of interest” and “inconsistencies in the public service.” The complaint noted that Forcieri was involved in Action Media AS and Rock Argentina SA, and maintained that he had used his position in government to obtain favorable loans for these companies, which had assets of only $12,000 and $20,000 respectively but received loans “in excess of $200,000 and $400,000.” The complaint further noted that Rock Argentina had not increased its capital since its founding in 2008. Carrió and Ferraro argued that it was inappropriate for a high official in the Ministry of Economy and Financial Services to be a founding partner of corporations with limited resources that received “generous” loans from banks. They underscored that both Rock Argentina and Action Media were officially chaired by Juan Carlos Lopez, who also chaired Real Estate Investments Aspen SA, a firm half-owned by Forcieri’s former boss Boudou.

One of the charges in the complaint involved the firm Ciccone Calcográfica. Boudou was said to have inappropriately helped the firm in 2010 to free itself from bankruptcy by means of a payment plan that enabled it to be transferred to an investment fund allegedly linked to Boudou, and of then having enriched the firm with government contracts. These charges developed into the scandal known as “Boudougate.” Forcieri was said to have participated in the alleged illegal activities, and was specifically identified as having introduced Boudou to Jose María Núñez Carmona, a central figure in the transactions under investigation. It was discovered that Forcieri, Núñez Carmona, and Boudou had traveled to Brazil in 2011 with Alejandro Vandenbroele, chair of Calcográfica Ciccone and an official of a shell corporation called The Old Fund, which Boudou and Núñez Carmona were believed to have used to take control of Calcográfica Ciccone. Attempts to impeach Boudou failed because of the Kirchnerist majorities in both chambers of the Argentinian Congress.

Forcieri was summoned to appear before Judge Ariel Lijo in June 2014 to answer questions about these matters, but he requested an extension on the grounds that he was doing “strategic” work at the World Bank in Washington. Lijo, who believed that Calcográfica Cicconi had printed ballots in the 2011 presidential election, thus suggesting that the company enjoyed close ties to the Kirchner government, had earlier warned that if Forcieri did not appear to testify, she would consider requesting his arrest by U.S. authorities. After Forcieri made his request for a postponement, Lijo asked the World Bank and Ministry of Finance to confirm his claim that his professional activities prevented him from traveling to Argentina to testify. Carrió described Forcieri as a “key figure” in the investigation and asked in a radio interview how the region could have a representative at the World Bank who is under investigation for criminal offenses. Ferraro, charging that Boudou and Forcieri were plainly attempting to drag out the case, called on June 25 for Forcieri’s arrest.
