= Guillermo Lousteau Heguy =

Argentine lawyer and politician (1934–2026)

Secretary of Tourism of Argentina
- In office 1981–1982
- President: Leopoldo Galtieri

Personal details
- Born: 11 September 1934 Buenos Aires, Argentina
- Died: 24 June 2026 (aged 91) Miami, Florida, U.S.
- Children: 2; including Martín
- Education: University of Buenos Aires
- Occupation: Lawyer

Guillermo Lousteau Heguy (11 September 1934 – 24 June 2026) was an Argentine lawyer and politician. A member of the Mont Pelerin Society, he served as secretary of tourism of Argentina from 1981 to 1982.

Lousteau Heguy died in Miami, Florida on 24 June 2026, at the age of 91.
