= Revolutionary Communist Party (Argentina) =

Maoist political party in Argentina

Revolutionary Communist Party Partido Comunista Revolucionario
- Abbreviation: PCR
- President: Juan Carlos Alderete
- General Secretary: Jacinto Roldán
- Founded: January 6, 1968
- Split from: Communist Party of Argentina
- Headquarters: Pichincha 165, Buenos Aires
- Newspaper: Hoy
- Youth wing: Revolutionary Communist Youth
- Membership (2016): 21,671
- Ideology: Communism; Marxism–Leninism–Maoism; Anti-revisionism
- Political position: Far-left
- National affiliation: Homeland Force
- International affiliation: São Paulo Forum
- Slogan: "Seamos libres, lo demás no importa nada."
- Chamber of Deputies: 0 / 257
- Senate: 0 / 72

Website
- www.pcr.org.ar

The Revolutionary Communist Party (Spanish: Partido Comunista Revolucionario) is a Marxist–Leninist–Maoist political party in Argentina.

The party is part of the Union for the Homeland coalition that supported the presidential candidate Sergio Massa during the 2023 Argentine general election.

== History ==
=== Beginnings as PC(CNRR) ===
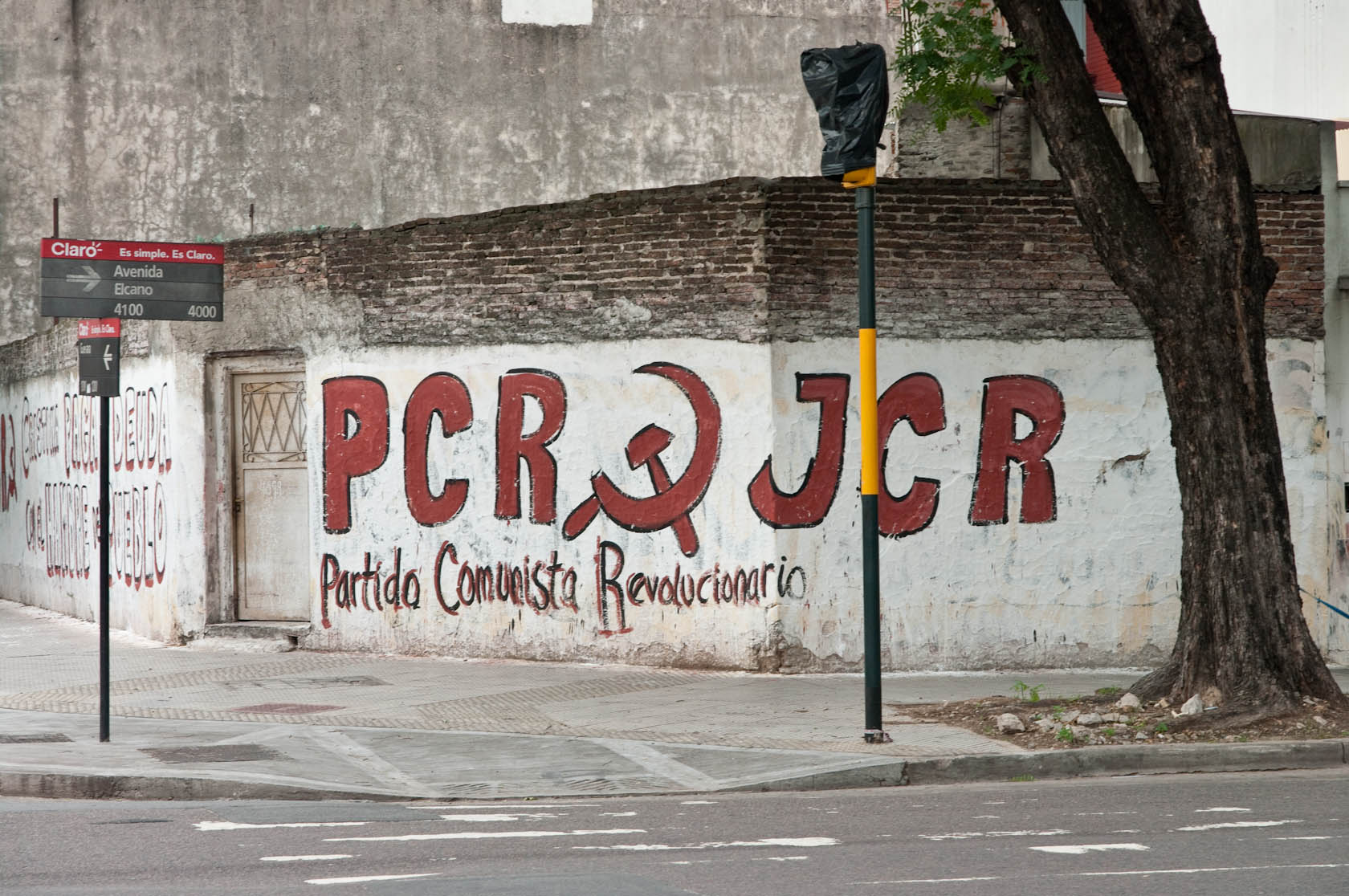
PCR mural

The party emerged from a split in the Communist Party of Argentina in 1967. On January 6, 1968 (the 50th anniversary of the founding of the Communist Party) the dissidents formed the Communist Party – National Revolutionary Recovery Committee (Spanish: Partido Comunista-Comité Nacional de Recuperación Revolucionaria, abbreviated PC(CNRR)). The founders of PC(CNRR) came mainly from the Communist Youth Federation (FJC), although the group also included some Communist Party cadres. Leaders of PC(CNRR) included Jorge Rocha, Carlos Echagüe, Lucila Irene Edelman, Ricardo Helman, José Ratzer, Antonio Sofía and Otto C. Vargas (veteran leader of FJC and erstwhile secretary of La Plata Zone Committee of the Communist Party). PC(CNRR) published Nueva Hora. PC(CNRR) rejected the Communist Party line of building a broad democratic front, accusing the Communist Party of 'conciliation with imperialism' and 'class conciliation'. In contrast to the democratic front line of the old party, PC(CNRR) called for the building of a national liberation front. PC(CNRR) sought to work within the Communist Party, to gain followers amongst its ranks.

PC(CNRR) was active inside the Argentine University Federation (FUA). In late 1967 the Communist Party dissidents (that soon would form PC(CNRR)) set up the Textile Organizational and Struggle Command (COLT) as its front group amongst textile workers.

On January 10, 1969, the name PCR was adopted, marking a definite break with the old Communist Party.

=== Development towards Maoism ===
Initially, PC(CNRR)/PCR had a 'guevarist' orientation. The party turned towards Maoism following a visit to China by a PCR delegation in 1972. The development of a Maoist identity of party led to a split, in which the adherents of immediate armed struggle were expelled from the party.

=== Involvement in automobile industry unions ===
PCR sought to organize workers in the automobile industry, by distribution of pamphlets at factory gates and sending some of its cadres to take up employment at factories. In the wake of the 1969 Cordobazo, the PCR identified the Perdiel plant as a priority for union organizing. Soon the PCR-dominated left opposition began gaining influence at the plant. On May 12, 1970, PCR activists took a group of French supervisors hostage at the Perdriel plant of IKA-Renault. This action was done in protest against the removal of leftist candidates in the local union election. The factory management caved in and reinstated the leftist candidates. The May 12, 1970 factory occupation marked the start of more militant industrial struggles in Argentina.

In late 1971, ahead of the 1972 Union of Automotor Transport Mechanics and Similar Trades (Smata) union election in Córdoba, PCR and other left groups (Communist Party, Communist Vanguard, Palabra Obrera, El Obrero, Peronismo de Base and non-affiliated leftists) launched the Trade Union Recovery Movement (MRS). On April 30, 1972, PCR won various leadership posts in the Union of Automotor Transport Mechanics and Similar Trades (Smata) union election in Córdoba. The MRS brown list defeated the Peronist green list. René Salamanca, a Central Committee member of the party, was elected general secretary of SMATA-Córdoba, accompanied by Roque Romero as assistant secretary.

=== FRA and the 1975 crisis ===
Ahead of the March 1973 general election, the PCR formed the Fuerza Revolucionaria Antiacuerdista (FRA, "Revolutionary Anti-Accord Force") together with Communist Vanguard and independent left groups.

In 1975, the PCR called for support to Isabel Perón's government.

=== After the return of democracy (since 1983) ===
PCR set up the Party of Labour and of the People (PTP) as a separate entity to build a broader, legal base. PTP contested the 1987 legislative election.

In the 1989 general election, PTP supported the candidature of Carlos Menem for president and his Frejupo alliance. Clelia Íscaro of PTP (i.e. PCR) stood as a parliamentary candidate for Frejupo.

PTP contested the 1993 legislative election.

Following the struggles after the events in Santiago del Estero in 1993, the PCR developed a line of electoral abstention (calling for blank vote) and call for insurrection.

== The PCR today ==
=== Involvement in the Piquetero movement ===
Within the onset of the 1998–2002 Argentine great depression, the party assigned Juan Carlos Alderete to build a section for unemployed within the Corriente Clasista y Combativa(CCC, the PCR trade union front organization). Thus, the CCC became the key element of the activity of PCR in the piquetero movement CCC formed a tactical alliance with the CTA-linked piquetero group FTV, and the FTV-CCC alliance emerged as the dominant bloc in the piquetero movement 2000–2003. The FTV-CCC bloc carried out several mass protests in the Buenos Aires urban area against the social and economic policies of the government. In 2003, the alliance between FTV and CCC broke apart over differences on how to relate to the Nestor Kirchner administration, as FTV favoured cooperation with the new government whilst CCC rejected it.

=== Rural movements ===
PCR maintains networks within agrarian movements such as Movimiento Mujeres en Lucha (MML), Juventud Agraria and Federación Agraria Argentina (FAA).

Ahead of the 2025 Argentine legislative election, the party reached a statement in which it declared to "fraternally greet the Peronist people" and "express our solidarity with the president of the Justicialist Party, Cristina Fernández de Kirchner, in the face of the judicial persecution". It stated: "We are fighting for Fuerza Patria to win the October 26 elections and to advance in defeating the government in the streets. We reaffirm our commitment to unity in the fight against plunder, to suspend debt payments and break with the IMF, for national independence, social justice, and the rights of the Argentine people."

== Outreach ==
PCR publishes Hoy as its main organ, and has a youth wing called Revolutionary Communist Youth (Juventud Comunista Revolucionaria, JCR). JCR publishes the monthly La Chispa.

== See also ==
- List of anti-revisionist groups
