= Taxation in Argentina =

Due to the absence of the tax code in Argentina, the tax regulation takes place in accordance with separate laws, which, in turn, are supplemented by provisions of normative acts adopted by the executive authorities. The powers of the executive authority include levying a tax on profits, property and added value throughout the national territory. In Argentina, the tax policy is implemented by the Federal Administration of Public Revenue, which is subordinate to the Ministry of Economy. The Federal Administration of Public Revenues (AFIP) is an independent service, which includes: the General Tax Administration, the General Customs Office and the General Directorate for Social Security. AFIP establishes the relevant legal norms for the calculation, payment and administration of taxes:

- taxes levied on operations carried out on the national territory of the country and in marine areas fully covered by the national tax policy;
- taxes, which are imposed on import and export operations, regulated by tax laws and customs regulations;
- corresponding deductions for social security.

The tax year is the fiscal year which can be calendar year or another period covering 12 months. The administration of taxes functions on self-assessment system and the ruling is covered only by a binding consultation system. There is no ruling system for taxes in Argentina.

== Taxes in Argentina ==
Taxes in Argentina are levied on three levels:

- federal level;
- provincial level;
- municipal level.

The main sources of state budget revenues in Argentina are:

- Income tax, levied both on enterprises and individuals;
- Value-added tax (VAT);
- Internal taxes.

The following federal taxes are applied in Argentina:

- Taxes on income, profit and capital gains: Income tax in Argentina is collected solely by the Government of Argentina, to the exclusion of the provinces. Argentina has a progressive tax on personal income that is collected as a deferred tax. It also has a flat rate tax on business income (corporate tax) - 35%. There is a stamp tax of 1.5% on the total value of real property, whether it gained or lost value, as opposed to just 1.5% applied only to realised capital gains. There is also an ad valorem property tax on other assets such as vehicles. There is also a 0.6% tax on all bank transactions.;
- VAT: The standard tax rate, currently 21%, is charged on the net price of the transaction. The special rate 27% is applied on services as water, natural, gas, power and communication services. Reduced rate of 10,5% is levied on some capital goods. Exports of goods and services are zero-taxed, because outputs are not with taxation and inputs can be reclaimed.;
- Excise taxes on electronics, tobacco, alcohol, soft drinks, perfumes, jewelry, precious stones, vehicles, tires, mobile phone services, insurance policies, gasoline, lubricating oils, and other items.;

Types of tax rates for excisable goods
Types of excisable goods	Tax rate
Tobacco	60%
Alcohol	12-20%
Champagne wines	12%
Beer	8%
Soft drinks	8%
Diesel cars and engines	10%
Luxuries	20%
Ships and airplanes	4-8%
Others	16-20%

- Taxes on property: The tax rate is set by the legislation of each province. The tax is paid monthly or every 2 months in accordance with the laws of a province.
- Taxes on foreign trade;

Regardless of the federal taxes in each separate Argentine province there are also taxes of the provincial level, :

- Tax on gross income;
- Real estate tax;
- Tax on vehicle fleet and vehicles;
- Turnover tax: Each of the 24 Argentine subjects has its own turnover tax rate. On average, turnover tax rate is approximately 3% to 5%, taxes for industrial activities are 1.5% to 4% and 1% to 3% for primary activities.
- Stamp Tax

The taxes based on provincial level are administered by the provincial revenue agencies.

In addition to the basic provincial taxes, each of the 24 subjects has, on average, three taxes (fees), unique to it. These fees are levied on individuals and legal entities for industrial safety services, health protection, environmental protection, advertising, airspace, quality control, sanitary inspection and electrical installations, etc.

In addition to the above taxes, set at the federal and provincial levels, in Argentina, the municipalities set a number of municipal fees: for lighting, garbage collection and other. The sums of municipal fees in fixed rates are determined in each particular municipality based on various conditions, for example, estimating the value of the property, its location, number of storeys, the year of construction, the condition of the roof, the materials of which it is made and others.

Argentina has agreements on avoidance of double taxation with countries such as Australia, Austria, Belgium, Bolivia, Brazil, Canada, Chile, Denmark, Finland, France, Germany, the Netherlands, Spain, Sweden, the United Kingdom and the United States. In October 2001, such an agreement was signed with Russia.

In Argentina, there are two modes of taxation, regulated by AFIP - general regime and simplified tax system. Taxpayers who are subject to taxation under the general regime are recognized as individuals or legal entities that pay the following taxes: profit tax, VAT, the minimum expected profit tax, personal property tax, and any other internal tax that is subject to collection and control by the Federal Administration of Public revenue. The essence of the simplified taxation is the establishment of a single tax consisting of two components: an integrated tax and a fixed amount. The integrated tax, is established on certain categories on basis of such indicators as:

- Gross income;
- The room space;
- Electricity consumption;
- Rent.

The application of the simplified taxation system by organizations provides for their exemption from the obligation to pay income tax, VAT, contributions to the Argentine pension system (SIPA), contributions to the National Health Insurance System.

== Wage taxation in Argentina ==
Taxes connected to wages are consisted only from social security. The social security system is financed by employer tax of 17% or 21% of payroll and 14% tax by employee. The health care works the same but with 6% tax from employer and 3% from employee. Self-employed individuals must pay their own tax monthly and it is a fixed amount.

== Tax evasion ==
Tax evasion has long saddled Argentina's public finances, shifting the burden to the middle and working classes by way of high value-added taxes (which are easier to collect). Improvements in enforcement since the 1990s have abated the problem from its peak in the 1980s, when fully half of all tax liabilities (and most income taxes) were evaded. Nevertheless, Hernán Arbizu, a former JP Morgan Chase executive, testified in 2013 and 2014 on how Argentine firms and wealthy Argentine clients still evade billions of dollars in taxes using local banks and exchange houses. Among those implicated were the Clarín Media Group; energy firm Petrobras Argentina; electricity distributor Edesur; the late María Amalia Lacroze de Fortabat and her executor, Congressman Alfonso Prat-Gay; former YPF head Sebastián Eskenazi; and the late television host Bernardo Neustadt.

During his testimony, he described how he helped clients move funds to offshore accounts (mainly in Switzerland), using private banking offices and legal loopholes. He stated that around US$85 billion had been transferred from Argentina to around 4,000 such accounts as part of a massive scheme that began in 2000, resulting in tax evasion losses of 60 billion pesos (US$7 billion); with the sole exception of Banco Credicoop, all 60 major banks in Argentina, including several local offices of foreign banks, had been involved.

Another similar case was that of HSBC Bank Argentina, which the 2014 SwissLeaks scandal revealed to have facilitated tax evasion on US$3.8 billion by over 4,000 local account holders. Accordingly, the AFIP revenue bureau had the courts issue an international arrest warrant on Miguel Abadi, whose GEMS fund accounted for at least US$1.4 billion of this total.

== See also ==
- Administración Federal de Ingresos Públicos
