= Martín Lousteau =

Argentine politician

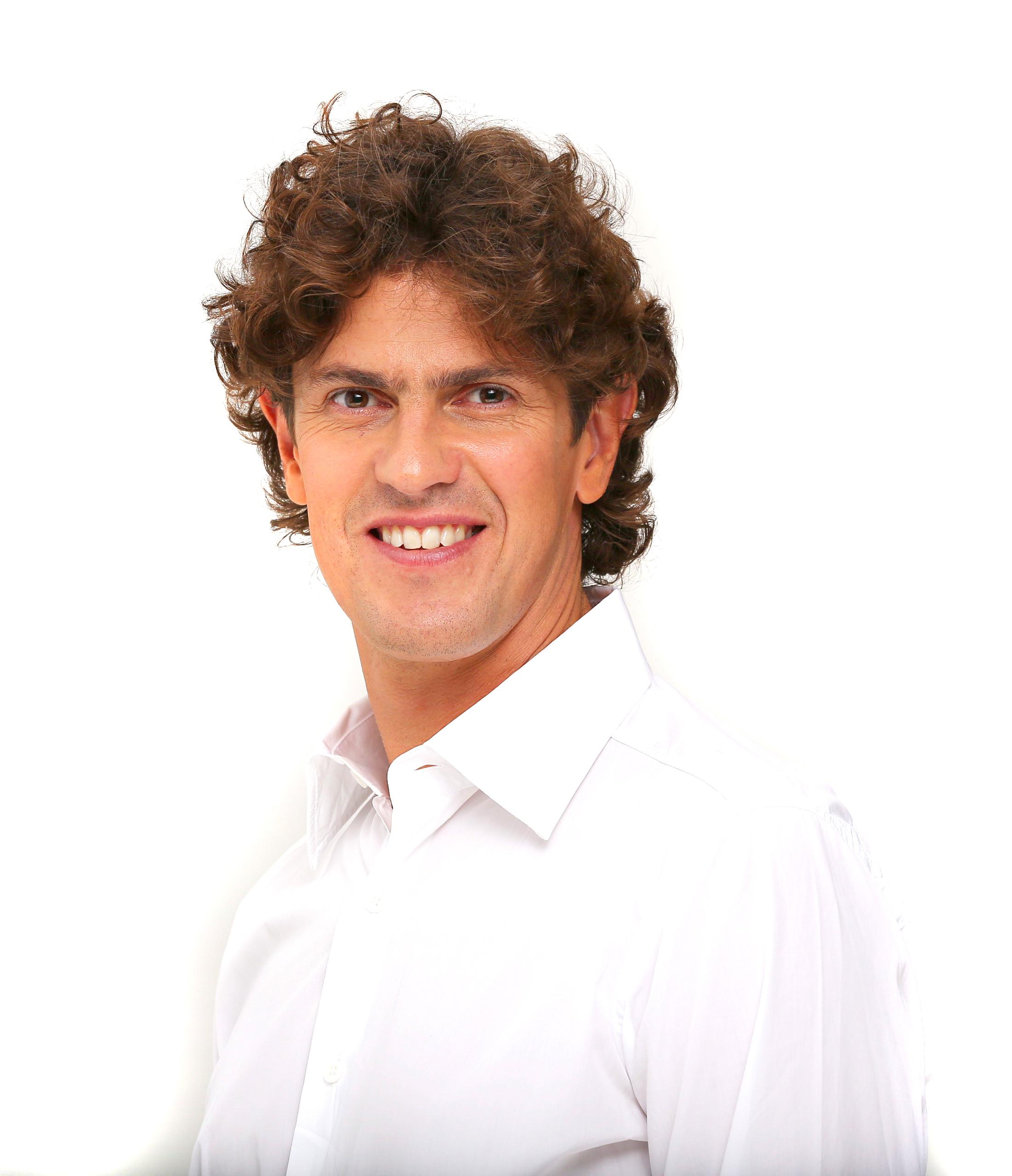

National Deputy
- Incumbent
- Assumed office 10 December 2025
- Constituency: City of Buenos Aires
- In office 10 December 2013 – 10 December 2019
- Constituency: City of Buenos Aires

President of the National Committee of the Radical Civic Union
- Incumbent
- Assumed office 17 December 2023
- Preceded by: Gerardo Morales

National Senator
- In office 10 December 2019 – 10 December 2025
- Constituency: City of Buenos Aires

Argentine Ambassador to the United States
- In office 10 December 2015 – 3 April 2017
- President: Mauricio Macri
- Preceded by: Cecilia Nahón
- Succeeded by: Fernando Oris de Roa

Minister of Economy and Production
- In office 10 December 2007 – 24 April 2008
- President: Cristina Fernández de Kirchner
- Preceded by: Miguel Gustavo Peirano
- Succeeded by: Carlos Rafael Fernández

President of the Bank of the Province of Buenos Aires
- In office 28 December 2005 – 9 December 2007
- Governor: Felipe Sola
- Preceded by: Jorge Sarghini
- Succeeded by: Guillermo Francos

Minister of Production of Buenos Aires
- In office 12 August 2005 – 28 December 2007
- Governor: Felipe Sola
- Preceded by: Gustavo Lopetegui
- Succeeded by: Débora Giorgi

Personal details
- Born: 8 December 1970 (age 55) Buenos Aires, Argentina
- Party: Radical Civic Union (2017–present); Independent (2005–2017)
- Other political affiliations: Front for Victory (2007–2008); Broad Front UNEN (2013–2015); Evolution (2015–2019); Juntos por el Cambio (2019–2023)
- Spouse: Carla Peterson (m. 2011)
- Children: Gaspar Lousteau (b. 2013)
- Parent: Guillermo Lousteau Heguy (father) Mabel Emma Gellon (mother)
- Education: University of San Andrés; London School of Economics
- Occupation: Economist

Martín Lousteau (born 8 December 1970) is an Argentine economist and politician of the Radical Civic Union (UCR). He is a National Deputy for the City of Buenos Aires. Since 2023, he has been President of the UCR National Committee.

He was Minister of Economy under the administration of Cristina Fernández de Kirchner, from December 2007 to April 2008. At the age of 37, he was the youngest person to occupy this office in more than five decades.

Lousteau served as the Argentine Ambassador to the United States from 2015 to 2017. In 2017, Lousteau joined the UCR but was not part of Cambiemos in the Argentine Congress.

From 2013 to 2019, he was a National Deputy, representing Buenos Aires. He resigned his bench at the Chamber of Deputies to be sworn in as Senator on 10 December 2019. In the 2025 legislative election he was re-elected Deputy for Buenos Aires.

== Early career ==
Lousteau was born in Buenos Aires to Guillermo Lousteau Heguy and Mabel Gellón. He graduated from Colegio Nacional de Buenos Aires. He is a Licentiate in Economics (graduated summa cum laude from the Universidad de San Andrés), and a Master of Science in Economics (at the London School of Economics). He taught as a postgraduate professor at the Universidad Torcuato Di Tella, and as graduate professor at the Universidad de San Andrés.

He is the author of Sin Atajos (No Shortcuts, 2005), a history of Argentina's economic crises, with Javier González Fraga; and Hacia un Federalismo Solidario (Towards a Cooperative Federalism), as well as specialized works and journalistic articles that have been published in Argentina and abroad. Lousteau had also been a tennis instructor (which he quit because of an injury), and worked as a war correspondent in Afghanistan for the magazines El Planeta Urbano and La Razón before the September 11 attacks.

Lousteau served as chief economist and later director of APL Economía, a consulting firm founded by former Central Bank President Alfonso Prat-Gay, and went on to hold various public offices as well as positions in the private sector. He was appointed Adviser to the President of the Central Bank of Argentina in 2003, for whom he designed a bank matching scheme for the payment of the discount window loans; and served in the Central Bank's Committee on Monetary Policy until 2004). He was appointed by Governor Felipe Solá as Minister of Production of Buenos Aires Province in 2005, and late that year was named Chairman of the Bank of the Province of Buenos Aires and of its parent company, the BAPRO Group, where he served from 2005 until his designation as Economy Minister in December 2007. He later co-founded a business consulting firm, LCG, with Gastón Rossi.

== Minister of Economy ==
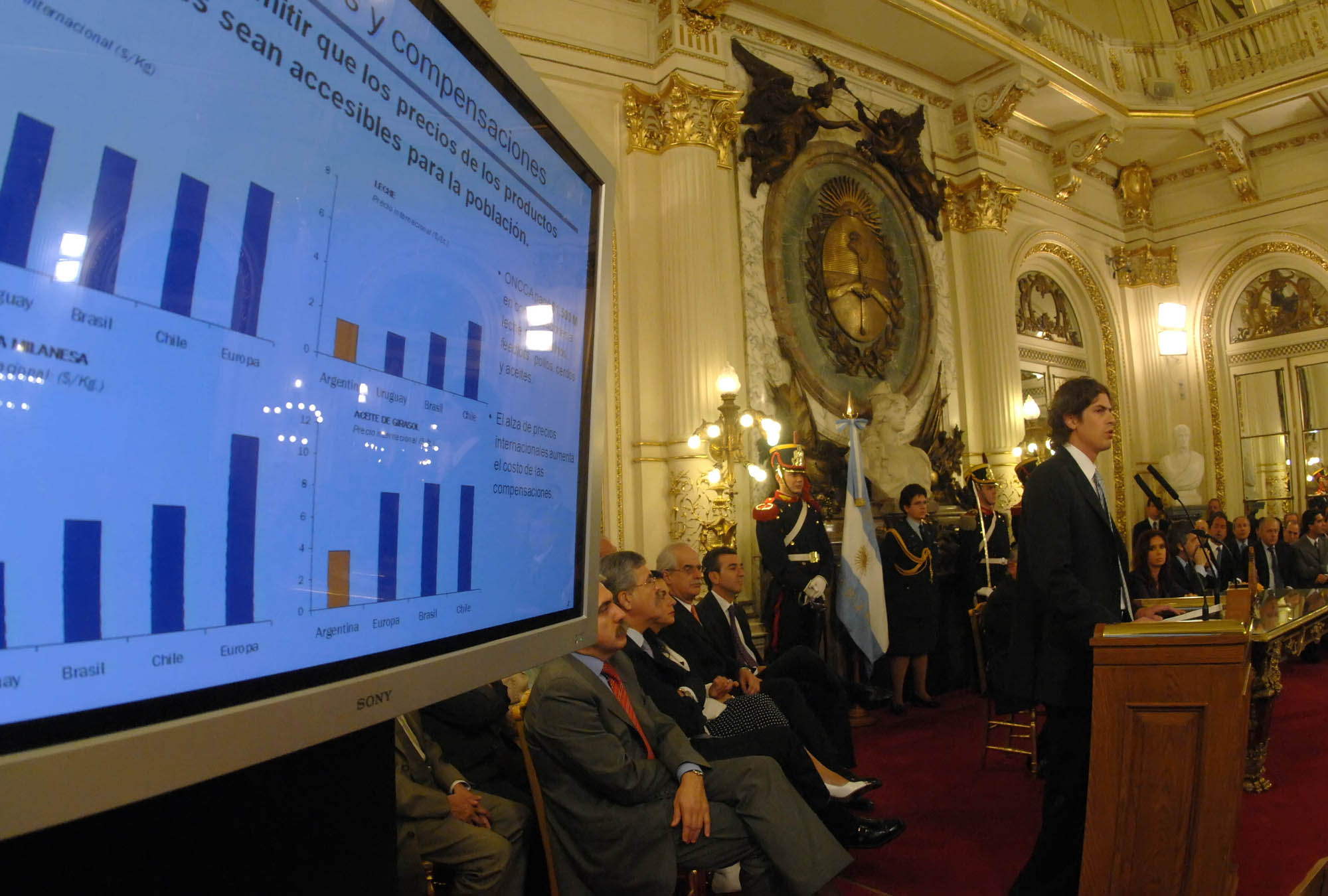
Lousteau making his case for higher oilseed export taxes in an April 2008 press conference. The resulting conflict with the nation's agricultural sector dominated his brief tenure as Economy Minister.

Lousteau was the first minister of economy of Cristina Fernández de Kirchner. There was a dispute in the cabinet at the time between Julio de Vido, Ricardo Jaime and Guillermo Moreno, and Alberto Fernández, Graciela Ocaña, Jorge Taiana and Carlos Tomada. Lousteau sided with Alberto Fernández, as he did not share the economic views of De Vido and Moreno. Fernández had promised him that both of them would be removed from government in a short time. Lousteau wrote a report for the president on the figures of the national economy, praising several aspects of the tenure of Néstor Kirchner, but warning about the growing inflation. This report was dismissed by Néstor Kirchner, who did not have an actual office but remained an influential figure. He also proposed to gradually reduce the subsidies to energy consumption, to eventually abandon the fixed price system established during the 2001 crisis. Cristina Kirchner did not support his proposal.

The salient feature of his tenure was the controversy surrounding his decision to increase soybean export taxes, which were previously fixed at 35%, and to have them fluctuate in line with global prices for the crop. This has been claimed as the major cause of the protests in the Argentine countryside which took place in early 2008. Lousteau was heavily involved in talks with farmers' leaders but was later sidelined.

Lousteau was rumored as early as two months into his tenure to have declared his intention to resign as a result of disputes with fellow ministers, particularly Commerce Secretary Guillermo Moreno. He denied he would resign; but there was nevertheless continued speculation on his resignation or replacement in the wake of the agrarian crisis. Lousteau resigned on 24 April 2008, with the tax agency chief Carlos Fernández replacing him.

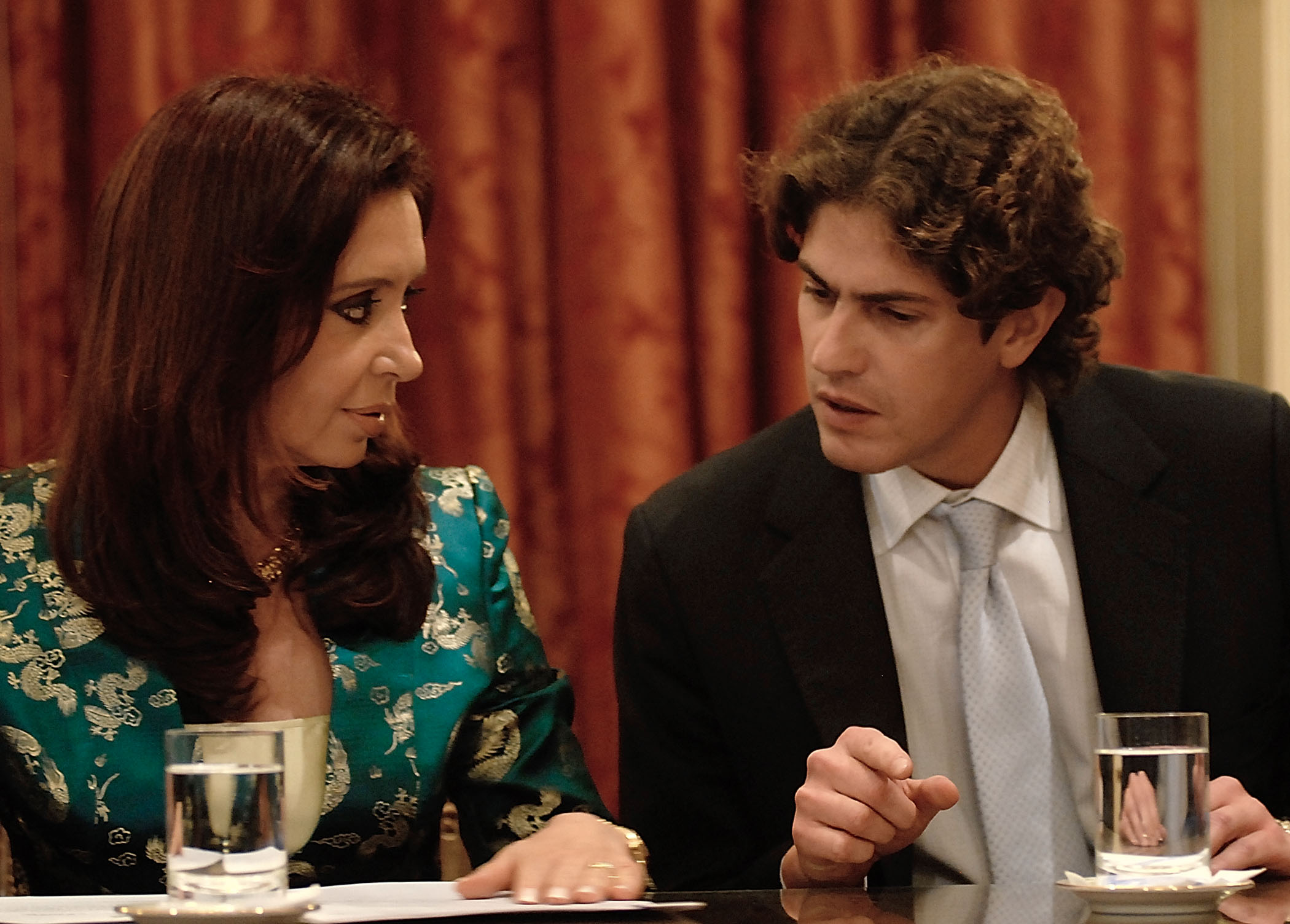
Lousteau with Cristina Fernandez de Kirchner

According to The Wall Street Journal, his brief tenure was clouded from the outset by interference from former President Néstor Kirchner's allies. Lousteau's policy initiatives often seemed to be eclipsed by those of Commerce Secretary Guillermo Moreno, a Kirchner loyalist described as "the administration's price policeman."

== Later work ==
Following his dismissal Lousteau contributed a weekly opinion column for the conservative daily La Nación and published two best-selling books on economic theory and history, Economía 3-D (2011) and Otra vuelta a la economía (2012). He received a Yale World Fellowship in 2012.

== Politics in Buenos Aires ==
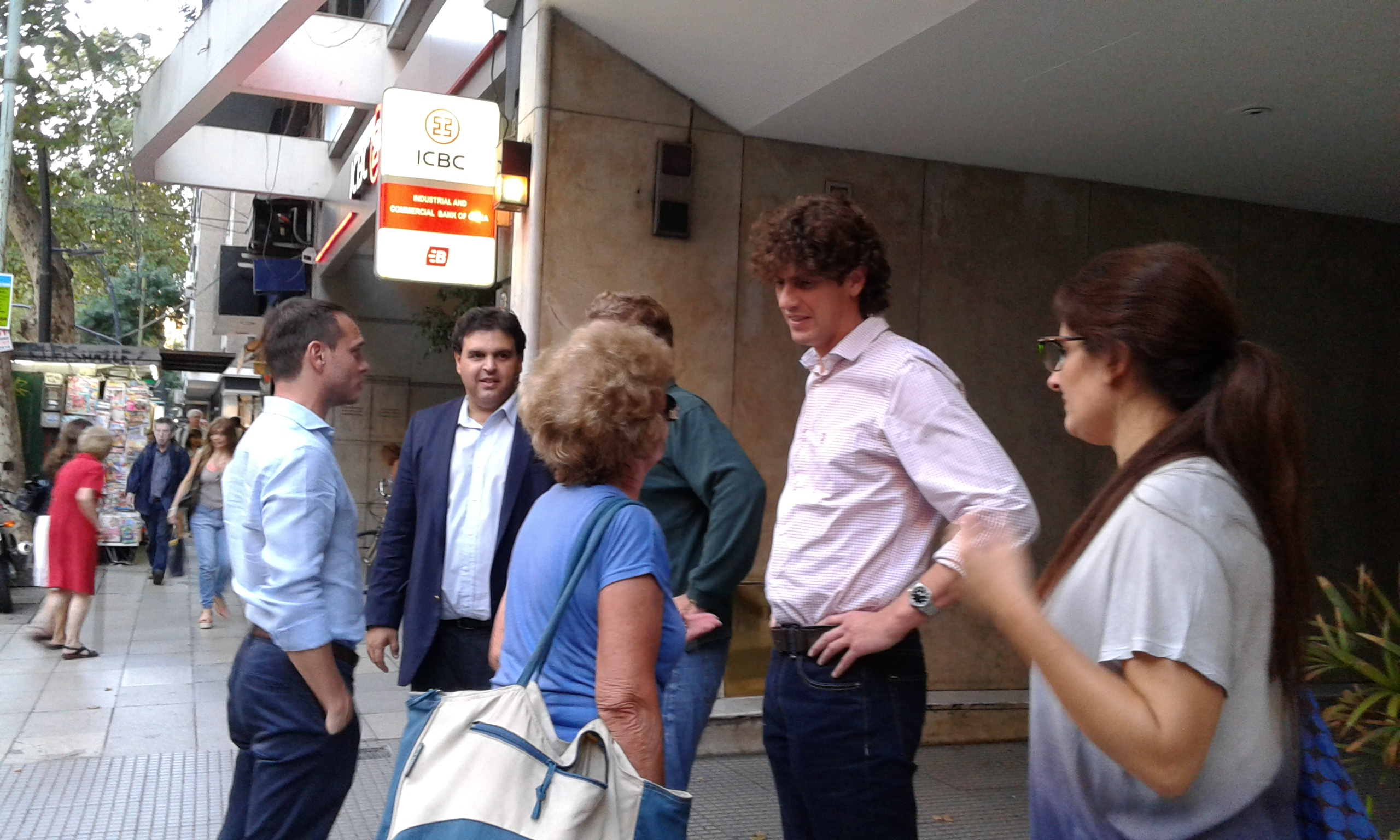
Martín Lousteau canvassing in Buenos Aires during his 2015 mayoral run.

Lousteau joined the UNEN coalition, led by the centrist UCR, and was nominated to their City of Buenos Aires party list for Congress in the 2013 mid-term elections. He was one of five UNEN candidates elected to Congress for the City of Buenos Aires; but ongoing differences with caucus leader Elisa Carrió led Lousteau to form his own faction (Suma + UNEN), joined by UNEN Congressmen relying in grassroots action in the UCR.

He ran for mayor in 2015 backed by centre-left coalition called ECO (Energía Ciudadana Organizada), and was narrowly defeated by Horacio Rodríguez Larreta. In these elections, PRO was stronger in wealthier northern Buenos Aires, while ECO was stronger in the southern, poorer neighborhoods of the city.

He was appointed ambassador of Argentina to the United States by president Mauricio Macri in 2016, but he resigned the following year to run for National Deputy in the 2017 Argentine mid-term elections.

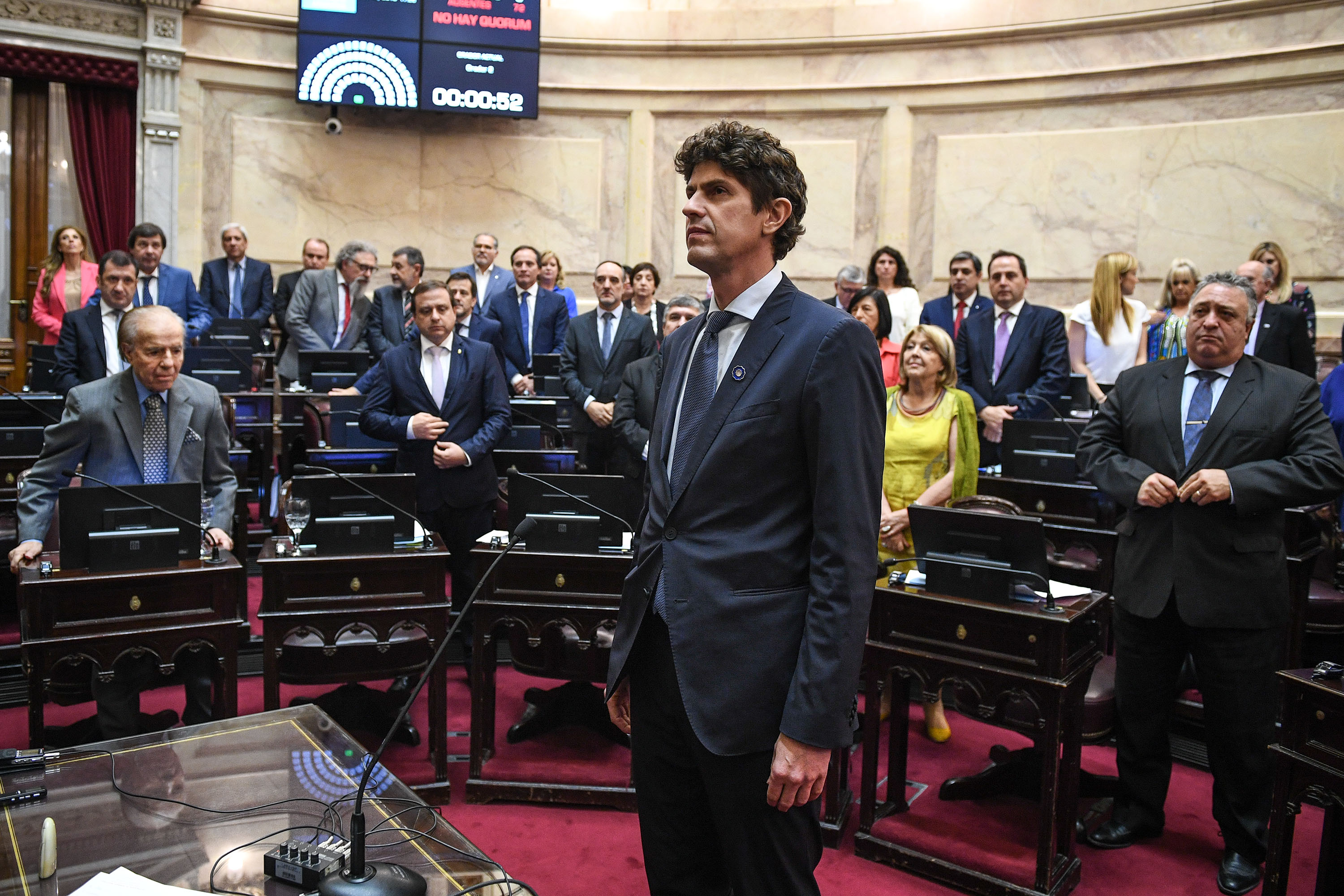
Lousteau takes over as senator, with Carlos Menem on the left

In 2017 mid-term elections, Lousteau ran heading the Evolución, which included the Radical Civic Union and the Socialist Party. Despite coming in third with 12.3% of the vote, he and Carla Carrizo became National Deputies due to Argentina's proportional representation electoral system.

== Personal life ==
Martín Lousteau married television actress Carla Peterson in New Haven, Connecticut, in September 2011, and the couple had a son in January 2013, Gaspar Lousteau.

== Controversies ==
=== Resolution 125 and the conflict with the agricultural sector ===
Lousteau's tenure as Minister of Economy was dominated by the controversy over Resolution 125, issued in March 2008, which established a variable formula for export duties on grains and oilseeds. The measure triggered the conflict between the national government and agricultural organizations, which became the central political dispute of his brief administration.

=== Isolation within the cabinet and resignation ===
During the escalation of the agricultural conflict, Lousteau lost influence within the cabinet and was sidelined in negotiations with sector leaders. He resigned on 24 April 2008 after less than five months in office and was replaced by Carlos Fernández.

=== Split within the Radical Civic Union ===
In 2021, Lousteau backed the split of the UCR bloc in the Chamber of Deputies, in the middle of an internal dispute over the party's leadership and direction. At the time, he defended the break as part of an effort to renew the party and accused internal sectors of blocking "emerging leaderships" and preserving privileges within the party structure.

=== Vote against Decree 70/2023 ===
In March 2024, Lousteau voted against President Javier Milei's Decree of Necessity and Urgency 70/2023, which he described as unconstitutional. His position generated strong criticism from government supporters and also caused a public split within the UCR, as governors and party leaders issued a separate statement distancing themselves from his stance.

=== Vote in favour of the Senate salary increase ===
In April 2024, Lousteau was criticised for voting in favour of a Senate salary increase approved by show of hands. The episode drew particular attention because broadcast images showed him raising his hand only slightly while speaking with another senator, which became part of the controversy. Lousteau later defended his vote, stating that the increase had been agreed in advance by the parliamentary blocs and that there had been prior consensus in the chamber.

== Written books ==
- Hacia un federalismo solidario (2003)
- Sin atajos (2005)
- Economía 3D: una nueva dimension para tus preguntas de siempre (2011)
- Otra vuelta a la economía (2012)
- Debajo del agua (2019)

== Electoral history ==
=== Executive ===
Electoral history of Martín Lousteau
Election	Office	List	Votes			Result	Ref.
Election	Office	List	Total	%	P.	Result	Ref.
2015 PASO	Chief of Government of Buenos Aires	Suma+	332,225	17.67%	3rd	Elected (Note: Won the coalition's internal election.)	
2015 1-R	Chief of Government of Buenos Aires	ECO	465,583	25.48%	2nd	→ Round 2	
2011 2-R	Chief of Government of Buenos Aires	ECO	806,525	48.36%	2nd	Not elected	
2023 PASO	Chief of Government of Buenos Aires	Evolución	511,734	27.97%	2nd	Not elected (Note: Lost the coalition's internal election.)	

=== Legislative ===
Electoral history of Martín Lousteau
Election	Office	List	#	District	Votes			Result	Ref.
Election	Office	List	#	District	Total	%	P.	Result	Ref.
2017	National Deputy	Evolution	1	City of Buenos Aires	237,132	12.30%	3rd (Note: Presented on an electoral list. The data shown represents the share of the vote the entire party/alliance received in that constituency.)	Elected	
2019	National Senator	Juntos por el Cambio	1	City of Buenos Aires	1,076,452	53.99%	1st	Elected	
2025	National Deputy	United Citizens	1	City of Buenos Aires	97,794	6.10%	4th	Elected	

== Bibliography ==
- Lanata, Jorge (2014). 10K. Argentina: Planeta. ISBN 978-950-49-3903-0.

Diplomatic posts
Preceded by Cecilia Nahón	Argentine Ambassador to the United States; 2015–2017	Succeeded by Fernando Oris de Roa
Political offices
Preceded by Miguel Peirano	Minister of Economy; 2007–2008	Succeeded by Carlos Fernández
Party political offices
Preceded by Gerardo Morales	President of the National Committee of the Radical Civic Union; 2023–present	Incumbent
