= Carlos Rafael Fernández =

Argentine economist and government official

Carlos Fernández
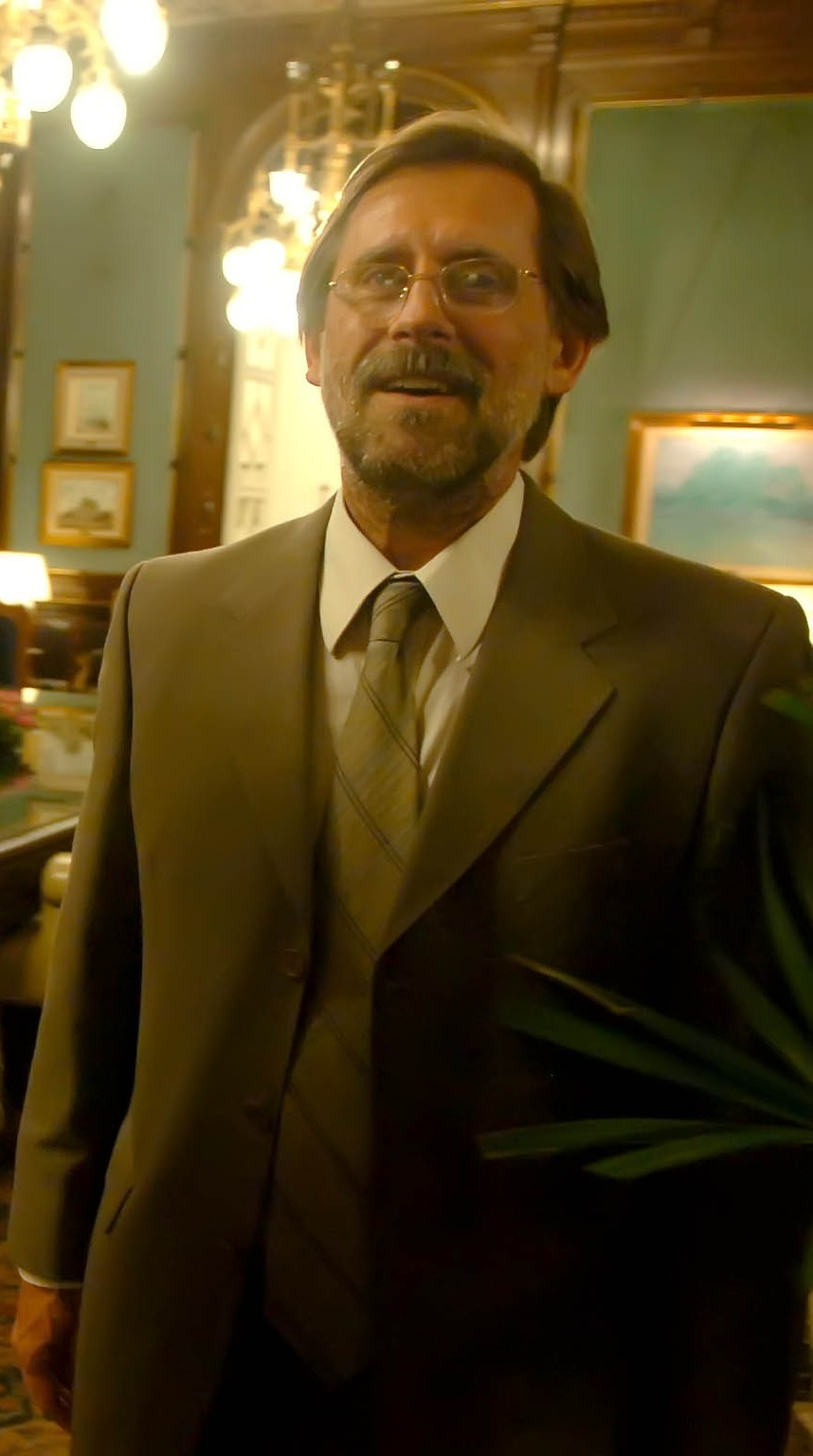

Minister of Economy of Argentina
- In office 25 April 2008 – 7 July 2009
- President: Cristina Fernández de Kirchner
- Preceded by: Martín Lousteau
- Succeeded by: Amado Boudou

Personal details
- Born: Carlos Rafael Fernández; 1954 (age 71–72) La Plata, Argentina

Carlos Rafael Fernández (born 1954) is an Argentine economist and was, from April 2008 to July 2009, the Minister of the Economy of the country.

== Biography ==
Fernández was born in La Plata, Argentina, in 1954, and was raised in nearby City Bell. Enrolling at the prestigious University of La Plata, he received a degree in economics in 1979, specializing in public administration. Affiliated to the populist Justicialist Party, the new administration of Carlos Menem appointed him Director of National Budget Policy for Provincial Spending. Remaining in the post during the difficult transition of numerous important federal programs to provincial budgets, Fernández was appointed Undersecretary of Budgetary Policy for the Province of Buenos Aires, Argentina's largest, in 1997 by Governor Eduardo Duhalde.

Following the May 2003 election of Governor Néstor Kirchner as President, Fernández was named Secretary for Provincial Relations, the President's chief liaison with the nation's Governors, remaining in the post until May 2006 to fill a vacancy in the Domestic Economy Secretariat (an important post in the Economy Ministry). Tapped as Economy Minister of the Province of Buenos Aires by Governor Felipe Solá in March 2007, he was returned to the President's office as Budget Director on Cristina Kirchner's inauguration in December of that year.

A conflict between the National Customs Administrator, Ricardo Echegaray, and the head of the National Revenue Bureau, Alberto Abad, led to the dismissal of both and to Fernández's appointment on 18 March 2008 as National Revenue chief. Following the 2008 Argentine government conflict with the agricultural sector, touched off by a proposed increase in export taxes, the economist's non-confrontational style helped lead to his 25 April replacement of the less conciliatory Martín Lousteau as Minister of the Economy.

The ruling Front for Victory's defeat in the 28 June 2009, mid-term elections led to a cabinet reshuffle, and Fernández tendered his resignation to the President, effective July 7. He was replaced by Amado Boudou, Director of the National Social Security Administration (ANSeS).
