= Amado Boudou =

Argentine economist and politician

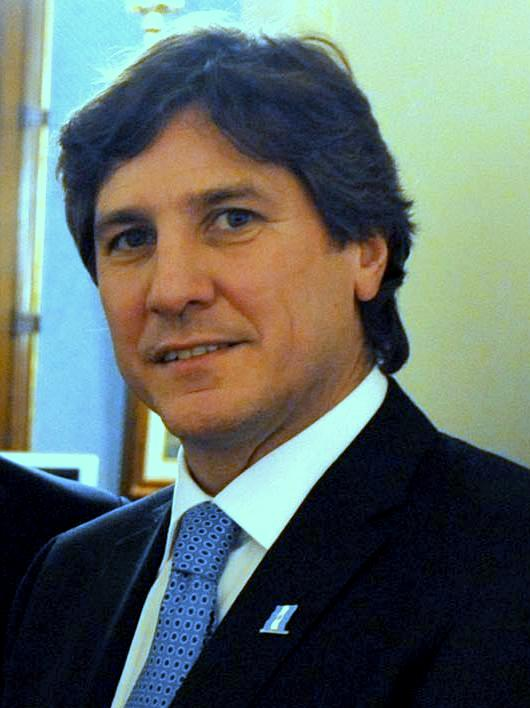
- Boudou in 2009

35th Vice President of Argentina
- In office 10 December 2011 – 10 December 2015
- President: Cristina Fernández de Kirchner
- Preceded by: Julio Cobos
- Succeeded by: Gabriela Michetti

Minister of Economy
- In office 8 July 2009 – 10 December 2011
- President: Cristina Fernández de Kirchner
- Preceded by: Carlos Rafael Fernández
- Succeeded by: Hernán Lorenzino

Executive Director of the National Social Security Administration
- In office 5 May 2008 – 7 July 2009
- President: Cristina Fernández de Kirchner
- Preceded by: Claudio Moroni
- Succeeded by: Diego Bossio

Personal details
- Born: 19 November 1962 (age 63) Buenos Aires, Argentina
- Party: Justicialist Party (1995-present) Union of the Democratic Centre (until 1995)
- Spouse: Daniela Andriuolo (1993–1998)
- Domestic partner(s): Agustina Seguin (1996–2007); Agustina Kämpfer (2009–)
- Education: National University of Mar del Plata; Center for Macroeconomic Studies of Argentina

Amado Boudou (Spanish pronunciation: [aˈmaðo βuˈðu]; born 19 November 1962) is an Argentine economist and politician who served as the Vice President of Argentina from 2011 to 2015. He previously served as Minister of Economy from 2009 to 2011.

In August 2018, following a lengthy investigation, he was convicted of corruption. He was then sentenced to five years and ten months in prison, and banned for life from holding public office.

== Early life and career ==
Amado Boudou was born in Buenos Aires, in 1962. His father, also named Amado, was born to a French immigrant from Aveyron named Aimé, and this became a nickname for both. He was raised in the ocean-front city of Mar del Plata and enrolled in the National University of Mar del Plata, where he received a degree in economics, in 1986; described by acquaintances as a sociable type and fond of the bass guitar, he helped produce a number of rock concerts in Mar del Plata in his days as a student, including a festival attended by 15,000 spectators.

Boudou attended graduate courses in economics and was awarded a master's degree in economics by a private institution, the Argentine Macroeconomic Studies Center (CEMA), which is well known locally for its support of neo-liberal and free market policies. Boudou was then brought in as a salesman by Venturino Ehisur S.A. (a local sanitation services company). Following his role in securing a number of lucrative hospital contracts for the company, he was named general manager in 1992 of their government contracts office. The company closed, however, when one of its top municipal clients terminated the contract in 1995. He then co-founded Ecoplata S.A., another sanitation services firm, and acted as its project manager; Ecoplata was awarded sanitation contracts by the resort cities of Villa Gesell and Pinamar. He married Daniela Andriuolo in 1993, but they were divorced five years later; they had no children.

Boudou entered public service in 1998, when he was named to the Comptroller's Office of the National Social Security Administration (ANSES) by Economy Minister Roque Fernández (a fellow CEMA alumnus), and in February 2001, he was named that office's general manager. The election of Justicialist Party candidate Juan Pablo de Jesús as Mayor of the seaside La Costa District resulted in Boudou's appointment as Finance Secretary for the popular resort district, which the policy maker accepted.

The Finance Secretary subscribed to the 2005 Federal Housing Plan promulgated by President Néstor Kirchner, a decision which made La Costa eligible for 486 low-income housing units. The contract, awarded to local builder Cantera FC in May 2005 for nearly US$10 million, was followed by Boudou's return to the ANSES, in January 2006. The Cantera FC contract resulted in an administrative debacle, however, when the builder abandoned the works in June 2007, having by then received over US$7 million in payments (for which the Mayor never initiated litigation).

== National policy maker ==
Returned to the ANSES by its director, Sergio Massa, Boudou was named its financial director (a post second only to the director's in importance), and oversaw the voluntary conversion of several million private pension accounts to the ANSES' aegis when this choice was made available in December 2006. He was appointed its director in October 2008, after Massa's promotion to the powerful post of Presidential Cabinet Chief.

Boudou's appointment coincided with President Cristina Fernández de Kirchner's controversial decision to transfer loss-plagued private pension funds' assets of nearly US$30 billion to the ANSES, citing the cost of subsidizing 77% of the funds' beneficiaries and the effects of the 2008 financial crisis on the government's ability to obtain financing.

Following the ruling Front for Victory's defeat in the June 2009 mid-term elections, Economy Minister Carlos Rafael Fernández tendered his resignation to the President, effective 7 July, and was replaced by the ANSES Director.

Fallout from the 2008 financial crisis later forced Argentine government of President Cristina Kirchner to seek domestic financing for growing public spending, as well as for foreign debt service obligations. These policies and ongoing capital flight put further pressure on the Central Bank's ability to finance debt service obligations, and the president ordered a US$6.7 billion account opened at the Central Bank for the latter purpose in December 2009, implying the use of the Central Bank's foreign exchange reserves, and drawing direct opposition from the institution's president, Martín Redrado; Redrado was ultimately forced to resign.

Boudou presented a debt swap package on 3 May 2010, for the holders of over US$18 billion in bonds who did not participate in the 2005 Argentine debt restructuring prepared by former Economy Minister Roberto Lavagna. These holdouts include numerous vulture funds which had eschewed the 2005 offer, and had instead resorted to the courts in a bid for higher returns on their defaulted bonds. These disputes had led to a number of liens against central bank accounts in New York and, indirectly, to reduced Argentine access to international credit markets.

In October 2010 Boudou compared Candelaria de la Sota and Martín Kanenguiser, journalists from Clarín and La Nación, with the people cleaning the gas chambers during the Holocaust. Kanenguiser requested clarification, but Boudou instead defended his statement. His attack was condemned by the FOPEA (an organization of journalists), members of the legislature, and the DAIA. The DAIA accused him of trivializing the holocaust, and Congressman Eduardo Amadeo demanded his resignation; Boudou later stated that this was a badly chosen metaphor.

The Economy Minister announced his bid for the office of Mayor of Buenos Aires in December 2010 as a candidate in the Front for Victory primaries ahead of the 2011 race; hoping to solidify his base among the country's influential trade unions, he made the announcement at the headquarters of SMATA (the machinists' and auto workers' union). Ultimately, however, Senator Daniel Filmus was nominated in May.

== Vice-Presidency ==
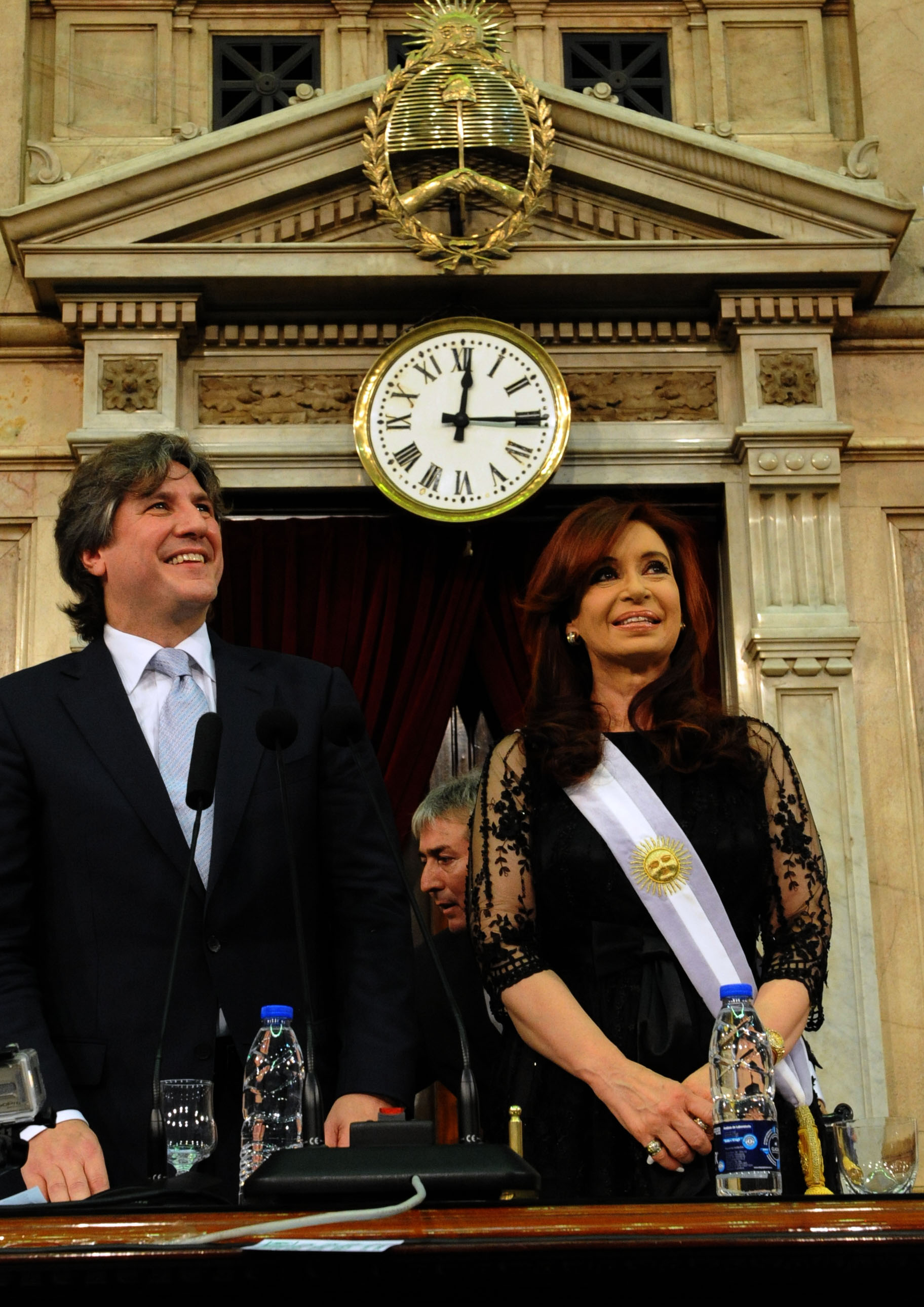
Boudou and Cristina Fernández de Kirchner at her 2011 inauguration

Boudou was nominated as running mate on President Cristina Fernández de Kirchner's Front for Victory ticket for the 2011 elections. Boudou's role in the campaign was noted for his numerous performances at rallies with his bass guitar, and as a DJ. They won the October general election with 54% of the vote. Vice President Boudou assumed presidential duties for twenty days on 4 January 2012, while President Fernández de Kirchner underwent a thyroidectomy and convalesced. Boudou again assumed presidential duties for 42 days on 8 October 2013, while President Fernández de Kirchner underwent surgery to relieve bleeding on her brain and convalesced.

=== Trial and conviction ===
The vice president faced accusations of influence peddling in 2012 regarding contracts awarded by the Economy Ministry to Ciccone Printing for the supply of 100 peso bills, license plates, and other government issues. The controversy arose following statements made by the ex-wife of Ciccone executive Alejandro Vanderbroele to the effect that Boudou was his silent partner in the firm. It was alleged that César Guido Forcieri, who had previously worked under Boudou, had made the connection between the two men. Pursuant to prosecutor Carlos Rívolo's request and following news that the Puerto Madero condominium rented by Boudou was owned by a friend of Vanderbroele who had, moreover, borrowed funds from Boudou, Judge Daniel Rafecas ordered the residence searched for proof of business associations between Vanderbroele and the vice president; a receipt for one month of homeowner association dues owed by the condominium's owner, Fabián Carosso, and paid instead by Vanderbroele, was located in the search on 4 April.

Following an August 2013 judicial ruling ordering prosecutors to provide evidence of wrongdoing, and their subsequent failure to do so, on 11 September a Federal Court granted a motion by Boudou's attorneys that would allow them to file for a dismissal of charges. He was, however, indicted on passive bribery and influence peddling charges by Judge Ariel Lijo on 27 June 2014; Boudou appealed the indictment on 10 July, alleging malicious prosecution. Boudou is also being investigated for several other offenses and/or crimes, and is a defendant in a total of ten cases in the Federal Courts.

On 3 November 2017, Boudou was arrested on charges of money laundering and racketeering, during the ongoing trial. The case concluded in August 2018 with him sentenced to five years and ten months. He has also been banned for life from holding public office. Nicolás Ciccone, former owner of Ciccone Printing, was also sentenced to four years and six months. He is jailed at a prison in Ezeiza, alongside other inmates also convicted in corruption cases during the Kirchner government, such as José López and Lázaro Báez.

Boudou claims that he is a victim of political persecution. He has said that the "alleged bribe has no basis or link to the evidence because it didn’t exist." This seems to be supported by the latest developments in the Marcelo D'Alessio case being investigated by the Federal Judge of Dolores Alejo Ramos Padilla. D'Alessio was allegedly part of an espionage gang with members of the AFI (Federal Intelligence Agency), the Judicial Branch and Journalists that forged false penal cases against members and allies of the former Argentinian government as part of a Lawfare campaign. The attorneys of Núñez Carmona, who was accused along with Boudou, asked Judge Ramos Padilla to investigate if the testimony of Vandenbroele was indeed prepared by members of the AFI and the Ministry of Security.

Political offices
Preceded by Claudio Moroni	Executive Director of ANSES; 2008–2009	Succeeded by Diego Bossio
Preceded by Carlos Rafael Fernández	Minister of Economy; 2009–2011	Succeeded by Hernán Lorenzino
Preceded by Julio Cobos	Vice President of Argentina; 2011–2015	Succeeded by Gabriela Michetti
