= Administración Federal de Ingresos Públicos =

Revenue system of Argentina from 1996 to 2024

Federal Administration of Public Income
- Administración Federal de Ingresos Públicos

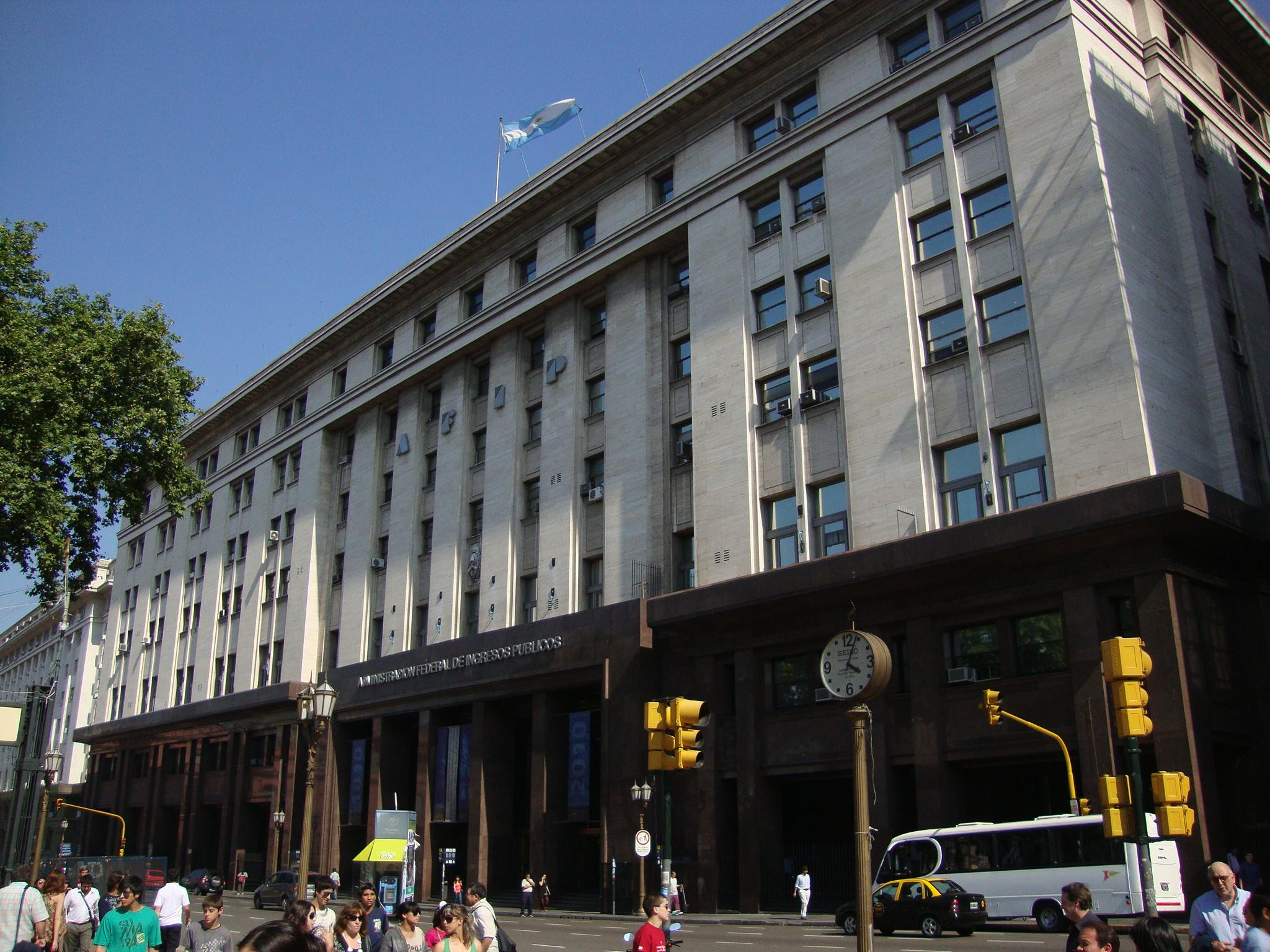
- AFIP's headquarters

Agency overview
- Formed: 19 October 1996
- Preceding agencies: Dirección General Impositiva (DGI); Dirección General de Aduanas (DGA)
- Dissolved: 24 October 2024; 2 years ago
- Superseding agency: Agencia de Recaudación y Control Aduanero (ARCA)
- Jurisdiction: Argentina
- Headquarters: Av. Hipólito Yrigoyen 370, Buenos Aires
- Employees: 21,400 (August 2024)
- Parent ministry: Ministry of Economy
- Website: afip.gob.ar

The Federal Administration of Public Income (Administración Federal de Ingresos Públicos, mostly known for its acronym AFIP) was the revenue service of Argentina. It administered taxation. The AFIP made a deal with the U.S. Internal Revenue Service to share information in 2017.

It was in charge of the application, perception, collection and supervision of national income and taxes, both internally through the General Tax Directorate, and on the payroll through the General Directorate of Social Security Resources, and external to through the General Directorate of Customs. Likewise, and within its powers, it was responsible for regulating the obligations and rights of taxpayers. The AFIP was an agency under the Ministry of Economy. On 21 October 2024, Javier Milei's government announced the dissolution of the AFIP.

== Dissolution ==
On 21 October 2024, Javier Milei's government announced the dissolution of the AFIP, without transmitting its powers, and the creation of a new body, the "Agencia de Recaudación y Control Aduanero" (abbreviated ARCA; Spanish for "Customs Control and Collection Agency"). However, the independence and autarky of this new entity are still unknown. The dissolution was officialised by Decree n° 953/24, published on Official Bulletin three days after it was announced.

It was announced that Florencia Misrahi, who was in charge of AFIP, would continue leading ARCA.
