= Boudougate =

Corruption scandal involving former Vice President Amado Boudou

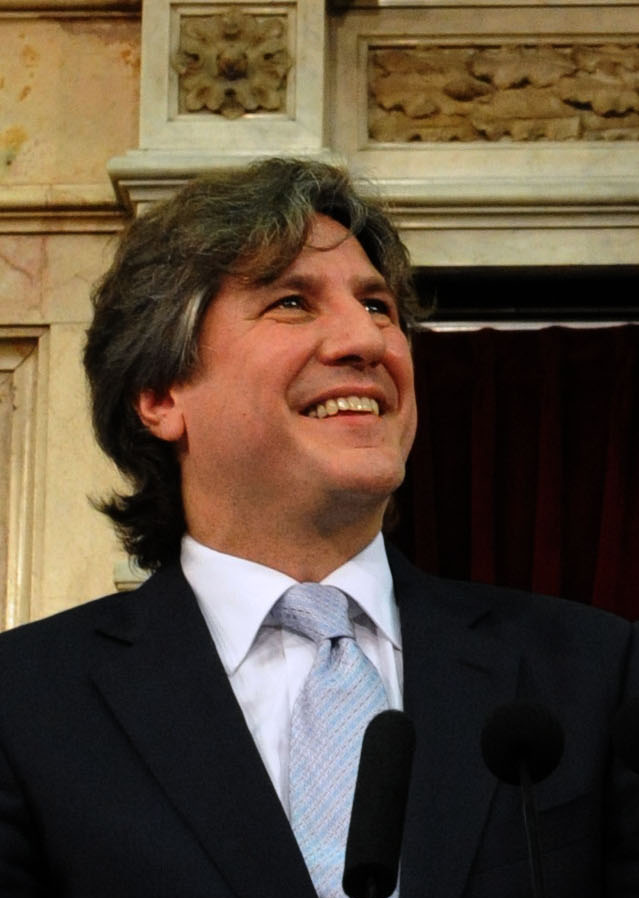
- Amado Boudou in December 2011
- Time: 2012
- Location: Argentina
- Cause: Revocation of the bankruptcy of "Ciccone Calcográfica" printing house
- Participants: Amado Boudou, Alejandro Vandenbroele, Ciccone Calcográfica
- Outcome: Ongoing

Boudougate is a political scandal in Argentina involving Vice President Amado Boudou and the printing house Ciccone Calcográfica. The AFIP, the revenue service of Argentina, requested Ciccone's bankruptcy in July 2010; but the AFIP reversed itself on September 24, 2010, and rescinded the bankruptcy request. A shell corporation named "The Old Fund", represented by Alejandro Vandenbroele, gave 2.3 million pesos to Ciccone; Vandenbroele became president of the organization as a result. Boudou, who was Minister of Economy at the time, instructed the AFIP to give Ciccone an exceptional moratorium to refinance debts. Boudou denied having any relationship with Vandenbroele, or even knowing about him, but it was confirmed later that Vandenbroele paid the rent and the cable television bill for an apartment belonging to Boudou.

== Development ==
The case began to be investigated when Laura Muñoz, Vandenbroele's ex-wife, accused him of being a mere straw owner of Ciccone and claimed that the real owner was Amado Boudou. She requested protection, fearing attacks from her former husband. However, her testimony had no judicial value, because of her spousal relation with Vandenbroele and her limited knowledge of his ongoing activities. Boudou denied having any relation with Vandenbroele or even knowing about him and said he believed the whole controversy to be staged by the news daily Clarín to harm the government. It has been alleged, however, that his connection to Ciccone was made through César Guido Forcieri, who formerly worked under Boudou. In addition, he accused Interior Minister Florencio Randazzo and a competing printing house, Boldt, of leaking the information about his relationship with Ciccone. Randazzo denied any relation with Boldt.

The relationship between Boudou and Vandenbroele was confirmed in April 2012, when the judicial investigation checked an apartment belonging to Boudou and discovered that Vandenbroele had paid the rent and the television cable service. It is suspected that Vandenbroele may have been living there during that time, and not Fabián Carosso Donatiello, as had been thought. Donatiello was a friend of Vandenbroele, had moved to Spain many years before, had no ongoing economic activity in Argentina, and his most recent registered entry to the country had been in July 2011. Boudou accused Judge Daniel Rafecas of being part of a "mafia" with the Clarín media group, something denied by Rafecas.

Following an August 2013 judicial ruling ordering prosecutors to provide evidence of wrongdoing, and their subsequent failure to do so, on September 11 a Federal Court granted a motion by Boudou's attorneys that would allow them to file for a dismissal of charges.

Despite the political scandal, the Central Bank of Argentina (BCRA) commissioned Ciccone in March 2012 to print currency notes on its behalf. Ciccone will print 120 million new Argentine peso banknotes. The proposal was initially resisted in the BCRA as Ciccone's financial instability would not allow it to meet the standards required to work with the state: the company had not made all of its required tax payments, and it had faced a bankruptcy a short time before. Central Bank President Mercedes Marcó del Pont blocked the formal writing of any complaints, however, and the deal was approved. The first banknotes from Ciccone were printed in May 2012.

== Political repercussions ==
The opposition attempted to impeach Boudou but failed to do so, as both chambers of the Congress had a Kirchnerist majority and Boudou was a Kirchnerist. The constitution requires two-thirds of the Chamber of Deputies to vote for initiating an impeachment process of the vice president, as well as two-thirds of the Senate to convict him as guilty. Opposition politicians Margarita Stolbizer and Eduardo Amadeo believed that Boudou should resign or explain what had happened.

As President Cristina Fernández de Kirchner would not be able to run for a third term in 2015, Boudou had considered running for office even though Kirchner won the 2011 presidential election. As of April 2012, his public support had decreased by over 11 percentage points since the election, from 43.2% to 31.8%, while his negative image had increased nearly 19 percentage points, from 34.9% to 53.6% and only 15.4% think that he is innocent. Despite this, he had not given up his plan to run.
