= List of Argentine deputies, 2013–2015 =

This is list of members of the Argentine Chamber of Deputies from 10 December 2013 to 9 December 2015.

== Composition ==
=== By province ===
| Province | Deputies | Population (2010) |
|---|---|---|
| Buenos Aires | 70 | 15,625,084 |
| Buenos Aires City | 25 | 2,890,151 |
| Catamarca | 5 | 367,828 |
| Chaco | 7 | 1,053,466 |
| Chubut | 5 | 506,668 |
| Córdoba | 18 | 3,304,825 |
| Corrientes | 7 | 993,338 |
| Entre Ríos | 9 | 1,236,300 |
| Formosa | 5 | 527,895 |
| Jujuy | 6 | 672,260 |
| La Pampa | 5 | 316,940 |
| La Rioja | 5 | 331,847 |
| Mendoza | 10 | 1,741,610 |
| Misiones | 7 | 1,097,829 |
| Neuquén | 5 | 550,334 |
| Río Negro | 5 | 633,374 |
| Salta | 7 | 1,215,207 |
| San Juan | 6 | 680,427 |
| San Luis | 5 | 431,588 |
| Santa Cruz | 5 | 272,524 |
| Santa Fe | 19 | 3,200,736 |
| Santiago del Estero | 7 | 896,461 |
| Tierra del Fuego | 5 | 126,190 |
| Tucumán | 9 | 1,448,200 |

=== By political groups ===
as of 9 December 2015

| Bloc | Seats | Leader |
|---|---|---|
| Front for Victory–PJ | 118 | Juliana Di Tullio |
| Radical Civic Union | 35 | Mario Negri |
| PRO Union | 18 | Federico Pinedo |
| Renewal Front | 15 | Alberto Oscar Roberti |
| Socialist Party | 8 | Juan Carlos Zabalza |
| Civic Front for Santiago | 7 | Cristian Rodolfo Oliva |
| Federal Commitment | 5 | Lino Walter Aguilar |
| Civic Coalition ARI–UNEN | 4 | Elisa Carrió |
| GEN | 4 | Margarita Stolbizer |
| Neuquén People's Movement | 3 | Alicia Marcela Comelli |
| Popular Unity | 3 | Claudio Lozano |
| Solidary SI | 3 | Carlos Heller |
| Union for Córdoba | 3 | Carlos Alberto Caserio |
| Civic Front of Córdoba | 2 | Graciela Susana Villata |
| Civic and Social Front of Catamarca | 2 | Eduardo Brizuela del Moral |
| Labour and Dignity | 2 | Mario Das Neves |
| PTS–Left Front | 2 | Nicolás del Caño |
| Social Christian | 2 | Rubén Darío Giustozzi |
| Suma + UNEN | 2 | Martín Lousteau |
| Single-member blocs | 18 | —N/a |
Source: hcdn.gob.ar (archived)

== Election cycles ==
| Election | Term | |
| Election | Start | End |
|---|---|---|
| 2011 | 10 December 2011 | 9 December 2015 |
| 2013 | 10 December 2013 | 9 December 2017 |

== List of Deputies ==
The table is sorted by provinces in alphabetical order, and then with their deputies in alphabetical order by their surnames. All deputies start their term on December 10, and end it on December 9 of the corresponding years, except when noted.

| Province | Deputy | Party | Term | |
| Province | Deputy | Party | From | To |
|---|---|---|---|---|
| Buenos Aires | Gilberto Oscar Alegre | Renewal Front | 2013 | 2017 |
| Buenos Aires | Ricardo Luis Alfonsín | Radical Civic Union | 2013 | 2017 |
| Buenos Aires | Andrés Roberto Arregui | Front for Victory–PJ | 2011 | 2015 |
| Buenos Aires | Alberto Emilio Asseff | UNIR | 2011 | 2015 |
| Buenos Aires | María Ester Balcedo | Front for Victory–PJ | 2011 | 2015 |
| Buenos Aires | Miguel Ángel Bazze | Radical Civic Union | 2011 | 2015 |
| Buenos Aires | Gloria Mercedes Bidegain | Front for Victory–PJ | 2011 | 2015 |
| Buenos Aires | Myriam Bregman | PTS–Left Front | 2013 | 2017 |
| Buenos Aires | Carlos Ramón Brown | Faith | 2011 | 2015 |
| Buenos Aires | Eric Calcagno y Maillmann | Front for Victory–PJ | 2011 | 2015 |
| Buenos Aires | Graciela Camaño | Renewal Front | 2011 | 2015 |
| Buenos Aires | Remo Gerardo Carlotto | Front for Victory–PJ | 2013 | 2017 |
| Buenos Aires | Luis Francisco Jorge Cicogna | Front for Victory–PJ | 2013 | 2017 |
| Buenos Aires | Diana Beatriz Conti | Front for Victory–PJ | 2013 | 2017 |
| Buenos Aires | Ricardo Oscar Cuccovillo | Socialist Party | 2011 | 2015 |
| Buenos Aires | Marcelo Silvio D'Alessandro | Renewal Front | 2013 | 2017 |
| Buenos Aires | Héctor Ricardo Daer | Renewal Front | 2013 | 2017 |
| Buenos Aires | Víctor Norberto De Gennaro | Popular Unity | 2011 | 2015 |
| Buenos Aires | José Ignacio "Vasco" de Mendiguren | Renewal Front | 2013 | 2017 |
| Buenos Aires | Francisco de Narváez | Light Blue and White Union | 2013 | 2015 (Note: Resigned on 10 December 2015. Replaced by Claudia Rucci.) |
| Buenos Aires | Eduardo Enrique "Wado" de Pedro | Front for Victory–PJ | 2011 | 2015 (Note: Resigned on 26 March 2015 to take office as General Secretary of Presidency.) |
| Buenos Aires | Edgardo Fernando Depetri | Front for Victory–PJ | 2013 | 2017 |
| Buenos Aires | Juliana Di Tullio | Front for Victory–PJ | 2013 | 2017 |
| Buenos Aires | José María Díaz Bancalari | Front for Victory–PJ | 2011 | 2015 |
| Buenos Aires | Julián Andrés Domínguez | Front for Victory–PJ | 2011 | 2015 |
| Buenos Aires | Victoria Analía Donda Pérez | Freemen of the South | 2011 | 2015 |
| Buenos Aires | Omar Arnaldo Duclos | GEN | 2011 | 2015 |
| Buenos Aires | María Azucena Ehcosor | Renewal Front | 2013 | 2017 |
| Buenos Aires | Laura Esper | Renewal Front | 2014 (Note: Since 3 April 2014. Replaced Graciela Ocaña.) | 2015 |
| Buenos Aires | Eduardo Alberto Fabiani | Social Christian | 2013 | 2017 |
| Buenos Aires | Andrea Fabiana García | Front for Victory–PJ | 2011 | 2015 |
| Buenos Aires | María Teresa García | Front for Victory–PJ | 2013 | 2017 |
| Buenos Aires | Carlos Enrique Gdansky | Front for Victory–PJ | 2011 | 2015 |
| Buenos Aires | Graciela María Giannettasio | Front for Victory–PJ | 2011 | 2015 |
| Buenos Aires | Rubén Darío Giustozzi | Social Christian | 2013 | 2017 |
| Buenos Aires | Gladys Esther González | PRO Union | 2013 | 2017 |
| Buenos Aires | Dulce Granados | Front for Victory–PJ | 2013 | 2017 |
| Buenos Aires | Christian Alejandro Gribaudo | PRO Union | 2013 | 2015 (Note: Resigned on 10 December 2015 to become president of the Buenos Aires Province Institute of Social Prevision. Replaced by Mónica Litza.) |
| Buenos Aires | Leonardo Grosso | Front for Victory–PJ | 2011 | 2015 |
| Buenos Aires | Héctor María Gutiérrez | Radical Civic Union | 2013 | 2017 |
| Buenos Aires | Sandro Adrián Guzmán | Independent | 2013 | 2017 |
| Buenos Aires | Gastón Harispe | Front for Victory–PJ | 2011 | 2015 |
| Buenos Aires | Carlos Miguel Kunkel | Front for Victory–PJ | 2013 | 2017 |
| Buenos Aires | Jorge Alberto Landau | Front for Victory–PJ | 2011 | 2015 |
| Buenos Aires | María Virginia Linares | GEN | 2011 | 2015 |
| Buenos Aires | Verónica María Magario | Front for Victory–PJ | 2013 | 2017 |
| Buenos Aires | Soledad Martínez | PRO Union | 2013 | 2017 |
| Buenos Aires | Sergio Tomás Massa | Renewal Front | 2013 | 2017 |
| Buenos Aires | Mayra Soledad Mendoza | Front for Victory–PJ | 2011 | 2015 |
| Buenos Aires | Carlos Julio Moreno | Front for Victory–PJ | 2013 | 2017 |
| Buenos Aires | Juan Facundo Moyano | Front for Victory–PJ | 2011 | 2015 |
| Buenos Aires | Mario Néstor Oporto | Front for Victory–PJ | 2011 | 2015 |
| Buenos Aires | Ariel Osvaldo Eloy Pasini | Front for Victory–PJ | 2015 (Note: Since 13 March 2015. Replaced Eduardo de Pedro.) | 2015 |
| Buenos Aires | Adrián Pérez | Renewal Front | 2013 | 2017 |
| Buenos Aires | Horacio Pietragalla Corti | Front for Victory–PJ | 2011 | 2015 |
| Buenos Aires | Francisco Omar Plaini | Culture, Education and Labour | 2013 | 2017 |
| Buenos Aires | Ramona Pucheta | Front for Social Inclusion | 2011 | 2015 |
| Buenos Aires | Adriana Victoria Puiggrós | Front for Victory–PJ | 2011 | 2015 |
| Buenos Aires | Carlos Raimundi | Solidary SI | 2011 | 2015 |
| Buenos Aires | Héctor Pedro Recalde | Front for Victory–PJ | 2011 | 2015 |
| Buenos Aires | Jorge Rivas | Front for Victory–PJ | 2011 | 2015 |
| Buenos Aires | Alberto Oscar Roberti | Renewal Front | 2011 | 2015 |
| Buenos Aires | Oscar Alberto Romero | Front for Victory–PJ | 2013 | 2017 |
| Buenos Aires | Eduardo Santín | National Alfonsinist Movement | 2011 | 2015 |
| Buenos Aires | María Liliana Schwindt | Renewal Front | 2013 | 2017 |
| Buenos Aires | Adela Rosa Segarra | Front for Victory–PJ | 2011 | 2015 |
| Buenos Aires | Felipe Carlos Solá | Renewal Front | 2013 | 2017 |
| Buenos Aires | Margarita Rosa Stolbizer | GEN | 2013 | 2017 |
| Buenos Aires | Gabriela Alejandra Troiano | Socialist Party | 2013 | 2017 |
| Buenos Aires | Mirta Tundis | Renewal Front | 2013 | 2017 |
| Buenos Aires | María Eugenia Zamarreño | Front for Victory–PJ | 2011 | 2015 |
| Buenos Aires City | Laura Alonso | PRO Union | 2013 | 2015 (Note: Resigned on 10 December 2015 to become head of the Anti-Corruption Bureau. Replaced by Alicia Irma Besada.) |
| Buenos Aires City | Alcira Susana Argumedo | Project South–UNEN | 2013 | 2017 |
| Buenos Aires City | Sergio Alejandro Bergman | PRO Union | 2013 | 2015 (Note: Resigned on 10 December 2015 to become Minister of the Environment and Sustainable Development. Replaced by José Luis Patiño.) |
| Buenos Aires City | María del Carmen Bianchi | Front for Victory–PJ | 2011 | 2015 |
| Buenos Aires City | Mara Brawer | Front for Victory–PJ | 2011 | 2015 |
| Buenos Aires City | Patricia Bullrich | PRO Union | 2011 | 2015 |
| Buenos Aires City | Juan Cabandié | Front for Victory–PJ | 2013 | 2017 |
| Buenos Aires City | Elisa María Avelina "Lilita" Carrió | Civic Coalition ARI–UNEN | 2013 | 2017 |
| Buenos Aires City | Ana Carla Carrizo | Suma + UNEN | 2013 | 2017 |
| Buenos Aires City | Robert Vincent "Roy" Cortina | Socialist Party | 2011 | 2015 |
| Buenos Aires City | Roberto José Feletti | Front for Victory–PJ | 2011 | 2015 |
| Buenos Aires City | Manuel Garrido | Radical Civic Union | 2011 | 2015 |
| Buenos Aires City | Carlos Salomón Heller | Solidary SI | 2013 | 2017 |
| Buenos Aires City | Juan Carlos Isaac Junio | Solidary SI | 2011 | 2015 |
| Buenos Aires City | Andrés "Cuervo" Larroque | Front for Victory–PJ | 2011 | 2015 |
| Buenos Aires City | Martín Lousteau | Suma + UNEN | 2013 | 2015 (Note: Resigned on 10 December 2015 to become ambassador of Argentina to the United States. Replaced by Julio César Raffo.) |
| Buenos Aires City | Claudio Raúl Lozano | Popular Unity | 2011 | 2015 |
| Buenos Aires City | Silvia Cristina Majdalani | PRO Union | 2011 | 2015 |
| Buenos Aires City | Liliana Amalia Mazure | Front for Victory–PJ | 2013 | 2017 |
| Buenos Aires City | Federico Pinedo | PRO Union | 2011 | 2015 |
| Buenos Aires City | Fernando Sánchez | Civic Coalition ARI–UNEN | 2013 | 2017 |
| Buenos Aires City | Cornelia Schmidt-Liermann | PRO Union | 2011 | 2015 |
| Buenos Aires City | Federico Adolfo Sturzenegger | PRO Union | 2013 | 2017 |
| Buenos Aires City | Pablo Gabriel Tonelli | PRO Union | 2011 | 2015 |
| Buenos Aires City | Alberto Jorge Triaca | PRO Union | 2013 | 2015 (Note: Resigned on 10 December 2015 to become Minister of Labour. Replaced by Marcelo Sorgente.) |
| Catamarca | Eduardo Segundo Brizuela del Moral | Civic and Social Front of Catamarca | 2013 | 2017 |
| Catamarca | Myrian del Valle Juárez | Civic and Social Front of Catamarca | 2013 | 2017 |
| Catamarca | Manuel Isauro Molina | Front for Victory–PJ | 2011 | 2015 |
| Catamarca | Marcia Sara María Ortiz Correa | Front for Victory–PJ | 2011 | 2015 |
| Catamarca | Néstor Nicolás Tomassi | Front for Victory–PJ | 2013 | 2017 |
| Chaco | Víctor Hugo Maldonado | Radical Civic Union | 2011 | 2015 |
| Chaco | Gustavo José Martínez Campos | Front for Victory–PJ | 2013 | 2017 |
| Chaco | Sandra Marcela Mendoza | Front for Victory–PJ | 2013 | 2017 |
| Chaco | José Ricardo Mongelo | Front for Victory–PJ | 2011 | 2015 |
| Chaco | Juan Manuel Pedrini | Front for Victory–PJ | 2013 | 2017 |
| Chaco | Gladys Beatriz Soto | Front for Victory–PJ | 2011 | 2015 |
| Chaco | Miguel Ángel Tejedor | Radical Civic Union | 2013 | 2014 (Note: Until 22 October 2014. Resigned to become mayor of Charata.) |
| Chaco | Alicia Terada | Civic Coalition ARI–UNEN | 2014 (Note: Since 22 October 2014. Replaced Miguel Ángel Tejedor.) | 2017 |
| Chubut | Mónica Graciela Contrera | Front for Victory–PJ | 2011 | 2015 |
| Chubut | Mario Das Neves | Labour and Dignity | 2013 | 2015 (Note: Resigned on 10 December 2015 to become governor of Chubut. Replaced by Sixto Bermejo.) |
| Chubut | Elia Nelly Lagoria | Labour and Dignity | 2013 | 2017 |
| Chubut | Juan Mario Pais | Front for Victory–PJ | 2011 | 2015 |
| Chubut | Cristina Isabel Ziebart | Front for Victory–PJ | 2011 | 2015 |
| Córdoba | Oscar Raúl Aguad | Radical Civic Union | 2013 | 2017 |
| Córdoba | Héctor Baldassi | PRO Union | 2013 | 2017 |
| Córdoba | Nora Esther Bedano | Front for Victory–PJ | 2011 | 2015 |
| Córdoba | Ramón Ernesto Bernabey | Front for Victory–PJ | 2014 (Note: Since 27 August 2014. Replaced Carolina Scotto.) | 2017 |
| Córdoba | María Soledad Carrizo | Radical Civic Union | 2013 | 2017 |
| Córdoba | Carlos Alberto Caserio | Union for Córdoba | 2013 | 2015 (Note: Resigned on 10 December 2015 to become a National Senator. Replaced by Agustín Calleri.) |
| Córdoba | Patricia De Ferrari Rueda | Radical Civic Union | 2011 | 2015 |
| Córdoba | Fabián Marcelo Francini | Front for Victory–PJ | 2011 | 2015 |
| Córdoba | Daniel Oscar Giacomino | Front for Victory–PJ | 2011 | 2015 |
| Córdoba | Martín Rodrigo Gill | Front for Victory–PJ | 2013 | 2015 (Note: Resigned on 10 December 2015 to become mayor of Villa María. Replaced by Andrés Guzmán.) |
| Córdoba | Mónica Edith Gutiérrez | Front for Victory–PJ | 2011 | 2015 |
| Córdoba | Diego Matías Mestre | Radical Civic Union | 2013 | 2017 |
| Córdoba | Edgar Raúl Müller | Federal Commitment | 2011 | 2015 |
| Córdoba | Mario Raúl Negri | Radical Civic Union | 2011 | 2015 |
| Córdoba | Blanca Araceli Rossi | Union for Córdoba | 2013 | 2017 |
| Córdoba | Juan Schiaretti | Union for Córdoba | 2013 | 2015 (Note: Resigned on 10 December 2015 to become Governor of Córdoba. Replaced by María Eugenia Brezzo.) |
| Córdoba | Silvia Carolina Scotto | Front for Victory–PJ | 2013 | 2014 (Note: Resigned on 6 August 2014. Replaced by Ramón Ernesto Bernabey.) |
| Córdoba | Jorge Anselmo Valinotto | Civic Front of Córdoba | 2011 | 2015 |
| Córdoba | Graciela Susana Villata | Civic Front of Córdoba | 2011 | 2015 |
| Corrientes | Araceli Ferreyra | Front for Victory–PJ | 2011 | 2015 |
| Corrientes | Juan Fernando Marcopulos | Front for Victory–PJ | 2013 (Note: Since 10 December 2013. Replaced Fabián Ríos.) | 2015 |
| Corrientes | Ana María Perroni | Front for Victory–PJ | 2011 | 2015 |
| Corrientes | Agustín Alberto Portela | Radical Civic Union | 2011 | 2015 |
| Corrientes | Carlos Gustavo Rubin | Front for Victory–PJ | 2013 | 2017 |
| Corrientes | María de las Mercedes Semhan | Encounter for Corrientes | 2013 | 2017 |
| Corrientes | Gustavo Adolfo Valdés | Radical Civic Union | 2013 | 2017 |
| Entre Ríos | Jorge Rubén Barreto | Front for Victory–PJ | 2013 | 2017 |
| Entre Ríos | María Cristina Cremer de Busti | Front for Victory–PJ | 2013 | 2017 |
| Entre Ríos | Jorge Marcelo D'Agostino | Radical Civic Union | 2013 | 2017 |
| Entre Ríos | Osvaldo Enrique Elorriaga | Front for Victory–PJ | 2011 | 2015 |
| Entre Ríos | Ana Carolina Gaillard | Front for Victory–PJ | 2013 | 2017 |
| Entre Ríos | Lautaro Gervasoni | Front for Victory–PJ | 2013 | 2017 |
| Entre Ríos | Liliana María Ríos | Front for Victory–PJ | 2011 | 2015 |
| Entre Ríos | Fabián Dulio Rogel | Radical Civic Union | 2011 | 2015 |
| Entre Ríos | Julio Rodolfo Solanas | Front for Victory–PJ | 2011 | 2015 |
| Formosa | Luis Eugenio Basterra | Front for Victory–PJ | 2011 | 2015 |
| Formosa | Ricardo Buryaile | Radical Civic Union | 2013 | 2015 (Note: Resigned on 10 December 2015 to become Minister of Agriculture. Replaced by Lucía Duré.) |
| Formosa | Juan Carlos Díaz Roig | Front for Victory–PJ | 2013 | 2017 |
| Formosa | Carlos Guillermo Donkin | Front for Victory–PJ | 2011 | 2015 |
| Formosa | Inés Beatriz Lotto | Front for Victory–PJ | 2011 | 2015 |
| Jujuy | María Gabriela Burgos | Radical Civic Union | 2013 | 2017 |
| Jujuy | María Cristina Fernández Blanco | Radical Civic Union | 2015 (Note: Since 16 July 2015. Replaced Miguel Giubergia.) | 2015 |
| Jujuy | Mario Raymundo Fiad | Radical Civic Union | 2013 | 2015 (Note: Resigned on 10 December 2015 to become a National Senator. Replaced by Graciela Albornoz.) |
| Jujuy | Miguel Ángel Giubergia | Radical Civic Union | 2011 | 2015 (Note: Resigned on 28 May 2015 to become a representative before the Federal Authority of Information and Communication Technologies. Replaced by María Cristina Fernández Blanco.) |
| Jujuy | Mariela Ortiz | Front for Victory–PJ | 2011 | 2015 |
| Jujuy | Rubén Armando Rivarola | Front for Victory–PJ | 2011 | 2015 |
| Jujuy | Héctor Olindo Tentor | Front for Victory–PJ | 2013 | 2017 |
| La Pampa | María Luz Alonso | Front for Victory–PJ | 2011 | 2015 |
| La Pampa | Gustavo Rodolfo Fernández Mendia | La Pampa Justicialist Party | 2013 | 2017 |
| La Pampa | Daniel Ricardo Kroneberger | Radical Civic Union | 2011 | 2015 |
| La Pampa | Carlos Javier Mac Allister | PRO Union | 2013 | 2015 (Note: Resigned on 10 December 2015 to become Secretary of Sports. Replaced by Martín Maquieyra.) |
| La Pampa | Francisco Javier Torroba | Radical Civic Union | 2013 | 2017 |
| La Rioja | Griselda Noemí Herrera | Front for Victory–PJ | 2011 | 2015 |
| La Rioja | Teresita Madera | Front for Victory–PJ | 2013 | 2017 |
| La Rioja | Julio César Martínez | Radical Civic Union | 2013 | 2015 (Note: Resigned on 10 December 2015 to become a National Senator. Replaced by María Clara del Valle Vega.) |
| La Rioja | Héctor Enrique Olivares | Radical Civic Union | 2014 (Note: Since 3 April 2014. Replaced Olga Inés Brizuela y Doria.) | 2015 |
| La Rioja | Javier Héctor Tineo | Front for Victory–PJ | 2011 | 2015 |
| Mendoza | Alejandro Abraham | Front for Victory–PJ | 2013 | 2017 |
| Mendoza | Guillermo Ramón Carmona | Front for Victory–PJ | 2011 | 2015 |
| Mendoza | Julio César Cleto Cobos | Radical Civic Union | 2013 | 2015 (Note: Resigned on 10 December 2015 to become a National Senator. Replaced by Graciela Cousinet.) |
| Mendoza | Nicolás del Caño | PTS–Left Front | 2013 | 2017 |
| Mendoza | Anabel Fernández Sagasti | Front for Victory–PJ | 2011 | 2015 |
| Mendoza | Patricia Viviana Giménez | Radical Civic Union | 2013 | 2017 |
| Mendoza | Juan Dante González | Front for Victory–PJ | 2011 | 2015 |
| Mendoza | Luis Alfonso Petri | Radical Civic Union | 2013 | 2017 |
| Mendoza | Roberto Arturo Pradines | Democratic Party of Mendoza | 2011 | 2015 |
| Mendoza | Enrique Andrés Vaquié | Radical Civic Union | 2011 | 2015 |
| Misiones | José Daniel Guccione | Front for Victory–PJ | 2011 | 2015 |
| Misiones | Stella Maris Leverberg | Front for Victory–PJ | 2011 | 2015 |
| Misiones | Luis Mario Pastori | Radical Civic Union | 2013 | 2017 |
| Misiones | Julia Argentina Perié | Front for Victory–PJ | 2011 | 2015 |
| Misiones | Oscar Felipe Redczuk | Front for Victory–PJ | 2011 | 2015 |
| Misiones | Silvia Lucrecia Risko | Front for Victory–PJ | 2013 | 2017 |
| Misiones | Alex Roberto Ziegler | Liberty and Democracy | 2013 | 2017 |
| Neuquén | José Alberto Ciampini | Front for Victory–PJ | 2011 | 2015 |
| Neuquén | Alicia Marcela Comelli | Neuquén People's Movement | 2011 | 2015 |
| Neuquén | Nanci María Agustina Parrilli | Front for Victory–PJ | 2013 | 2015 (Note: Resigned on 10 December 2015. Replaced by Darío Martínez.) |
| Neuquén | Adrián San Martín | Neuquén People's Movement | 2013 | 2017 |
| Neuquén | María Inés Villa Molina | Neuquén People's Movement | 2013 | 2017 |
| Río Negro | Herman Horacio Avoscan | Front for Victory–PJ | 2011 | 2015 |
| Río Negro | Luis María Bardeggia | Front for Victory–PJ | 2013 | 2017 |
| Río Negro | Jorge Alberto Cejas | Front for Victory–PJ | 2011 | 2015 |
| Río Negro | Josué Gagliardi | Front for Victory–PJ | 2013 (Note: Since 10 December 2013. Replaced Silvina García Larraburu.) | 2015 |
| Río Negro | María Emilia Soria | Front for Victory–PJ | 2013 | 2017 |
| Salta | Bernardo José Biella Calvet | UDESO Salta | 2011 | 2015 |
| Salta | Susana Mercedes Canela | Front for Victory–PJ | 2013 (Note: Since 10 December 2013. Replaced Cristina Fiore.) | 2015 |
| Salta | Guillermo Mario Durand Cornejo | Conservative People's Party | 2013 | 2017 |
| Salta | Evita Nélida Isa | Front for Victory–PJ | 2013 | 2017 |
| Salta | Pablo Francisco Juan Kosiner | Front for Victory–PJ | 2011 | 2015 |
| Salta | Pablo Sebastián López | Workers' Left Front | 2013 | 2017 |
| Salta | José Antonio Vilariño | Front for Victory–PJ | 2011 | 2015 |
| San Juan | Eduardo Augusto Cáceres | PRO Union | 2013 | 2017 |
| San Juan | Graciela María Caselles | Front for Victory–PJ | 2011 | 2015 |
| San Juan | Sandra Daniela Castro | Front for Victory–PJ | 2013 | 2017 |
| San Juan | Héctor Daniel Tomas | Front for Victory–PJ | 2013 | 2017 |
| San Juan | José Rubén Uñac | Front for Victory–PJ | 2011 | 2015 |
| San Juan | José Antonio Villa | Front for Victory–PJ | 2011 | 2015 |
| San Luis | Lino Walter Aguilar | Federal Commitment | 2011 | 2015 |
| San Luis | Berta Hortensia Arenas | Federal Commitment | 2013 | 2017 |
| San Luis | Ivana María Bianchi | Federal Commitment | 2011 | 2015 |
| San Luis | José Luis Riccardo | Radical Civic Union | 2013 | 2017 |
| San Luis | Fernando Aldo Salino | Federal Commitment | 2013 | 2015 (Note: Resigned on 10 December 2015. Replaced by Luis Lusquiños.) |
| Santa Cruz | Eduardo Raúl Costa | Radical Civic Union | 2013 | 2017 |
| Santa Cruz | Mauricio Ricardo Gómez Bull | Front for Victory–PJ | 2013 | 2017 |
| Santa Cruz | Ana María Ianni | Front for Victory–PJ | 2011 | 2015 |
| Santa Cruz | Mario Alfredo Metaza | Front for Victory–PJ | 2011 | 2015 |
| Santa Cruz | Susana María Toledo | Radical Civic Union | 2013 | 2017 |
| Santa Fe | Omar Segundo Barchetta | Socialist Party | 2011 | 2015 |
| Santa Fe | Mario Domingo Barletta | Radical Civic Union | 2013 | 2017 |
| Santa Fe | Hermes Juan Binner | Socialist Party | 2013 | 2017 |
| Santa Fe | Alicia Mabel Ciciliani | Socialist Party | 2013 | 2017 |
| Santa Fe | Marcos Cleri | Front for Victory–PJ | 2011 | 2015 |
| Santa Fe | Miguel Ignacio Torres del Sel | PRO Union | 2013 | 2014 (Note: Resigned on 25 July 2014. Replaced by Luciano Laspina.) |
| Santa Fe | Claudia Alejandra Giaccone | Front for Victory–PJ | 2011 | 2015 |
| Santa Fe | Josefina Victoria González Tosetto | Front for Victory–PJ | 2013 | 2017 |
| Santa Fe | Pablo Lautaro Javkin | Civic Coalition ARI–UNEN | 2013 | 2015 (Note: Resigned on 10 December 2015 to become secretary general of the municipality of Rosario. Replaced by Ana Copes.) |
| Santa Fe | Luciano Andrés Laspina | PRO Union | 2015 (Note: Since 24 February 2015. Replaced Miguel del Sel) | 2017 |
| Santa Fe | Oscar Ariel Martínez | Renewal Front | 2011 | 2015 |
| Santa Fe | Jorge Alberto Obeid | Front for Victory–PJ | 2013 | 2014 (Note: Died on 28 February 2014. Replaced by Eduardo Jorge Seminara.) |
| Santa Fe | Fabián Francisco Peralta | GEN | 2011 | 2015 |
| Santa Fe | Omar Ángel Perotti | Front for Victory–PJ | 2011 | 2015 |
| Santa Fe | Élida Elena Rasino | Socialist Party | 2011 | 2015 |
| Santa Fe | Antonio Sabino Riestra | Popular Unity | 2011 | 2015 |
| Santa Fe | Gisela Scaglia | PRO Union | 2013 | 2017 |
| Santa Fe | Eduardo Jorge Seminara | Front for Victory–PJ | 2014 (Note: Since 3 April 2014. Replaced Jorge Alberto Obeid.) | 2017 |
| Santa Fe | Silvia Rosa Simoncini | Front for Victory–PJ | 2011 | 2015 |
| Santa Fe | Ricardo Adrián Spinozzi | PRO Union | 2013 | 2017 |
| Santa Fe | Juan Carlos Zabalza | Socialist Party | 2011 | 2015 |
| Santiago del Estero | Norma Amanda Abdala de Matarazzo | Civic Front for Santiago | 2013 | 2017 |
| Santiago del Estero | José Alberto Herrera | Civic Front for Santiago | 2011 | 2015 |
| Santiago del Estero | Manuel Humberto Juárez | Civic Front for Santiago | 2013 | 2017 |
| Santiago del Estero | Graciela Navarro | Civic Front for Santiago | 2011 | 2015 |
| Santiago del Estero | Cristian Rodolfo Oliva | Civic Front for Santiago | 2013 | 2017 |
| Santiago del Estero | Mirta Ameliana Pastoriza | Civic Front for Santiago | 2011 | 2015 |
| Santiago del Estero | Aída Delia Ruiz | Civic Front for Santiago | 2011 | 2015 |
| Tierra del Fuego | Graciela Eunice Boyadjian | Fueguian People's Movement | 2013 (Note: Since 10 December 2013. Replaced Jorge Alberto Garramuño.) | 2015 |
| Tierra del Fuego | Verónica González | Front for Victory–PJ | 2013 (Note: Since 10 December 2013. Replaced Julio César Catalán Magni.) | 2015 |
| Tierra del Fuego | Oscar Anselmo Martínez | Solidary People's Movement | 2013 | 2017 |
| Tierra del Fuego | Martín Alejandro Pérez | Front for Victory–PJ | 2013 | 2017 |
| Tierra del Fuego | Rubén Darío Sciutto | Peronism Further South | 2011 | 2015 |
| Tucumán | Isaac Benjamín Bromberg | Front for Victory–PJ | 2013 | 2017 |
| Tucumán | José Manuel Cano | Radical Civic Union | 2013 | 2015 (Note: Resigned on 10 December 2015 to become head of the Plan Belgrano. Replaced by Federico Masso.) |
| Tucumán | María del Carmen Carrillo | Front for Victory–PJ | 2011 | 2015 |
| Tucumán | Nilda Mabel Carrizo | Front for Victory–PJ | 2013 | 2017 |
| Tucumán | Juan Francisco Casañas | Radical Civic Union | 2014 (Note: Since 3 April 2014. Replaced Silvia Elías de Pérez, who never took office.) | 2017 |
| Tucumán | Alfredo Carlos Dato | Front for Victory–PJ | 2011 | 2015 |
| Tucumán | Miriam Graciela Gallardo | Front for Victory–PJ | 2014 (Note: Since 3 April 2014. Replaced Osvaldo Francisco Jaldo.) | 2017 |
| Tucumán | Osvaldo Francisco Jaldo | Front for Victory–PJ | 2013 | 2014 (Note: Resigned on 5 March 2014 to become Minister of the Interior of Tucumán Province. Replaced by Miriam Graciela Gallardo.) |
| Tucumán | Luis Fernando Sacca | Radical Civic Union | 2011 | 2015 |
| Tucumán | Walter Marcelo Santillán | Front for Victory–PJ | 2011 | 2015 |
