= De Andreis =

De Andreis (or de Andreis) is a surname. Notable with this surname are:

- Felix de Andreis (1778–1820), Italian-born American Catholic cleric
- Fernando de Andreis (born 1976), Argentine politician

== See also ==
- Andreis
