= Julio Vitobello =

Argentine lawyer

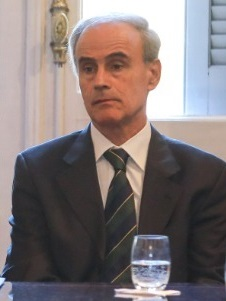

General Secretary of the Presidency
- In office 10 December 2019 – 10 December 2023
- President: Alberto Fernández
- Preceded by: Fernando de Andreis
- Succeeded by: Karina Milei

Secretary of Public Ethics, Transparency and the Fight against Corruption
- In office 23 January 2009 – 29 December 2015
- Preceded by: Abel Fleitas Ortiz de Rozas
- Succeeded by: Laura Alonso

General Comptroller of the Nation
- In office 28 December 2007 – 23 January 2009
- President: Cristina Fernández de Kirchner
- Preceded by: Claudio Moroni
- Succeeded by: Carlos Pacios

Personal details
- Born: 2 March 1957 (age 69) Buenos Aires, Argentina
- Party: Justicialist Party
- Other political affiliations: Front for Victory (2003–2017); Frente de Todos (2019–present)
- Education: University of Buenos Aires

Julio Fernando Vitobello (born 2 March 1957) is an Argentine politician who served as General Secretary of the Presidency of the Nation from 2019 to 2023, designated by President Alberto Fernández. Previously, from 2009 to 2015, he was head of the Anti-Corruption Bureau. He also served as General Comptroller of the Nation from 2007 to 2009 and as a member of the Buenos Aires City Legislature.

== Early life and career ==
Julio Fernando Vitobello was born on 2 March 1957 in Buenos Aires. He studied law at the University of Buenos Aires. His political career started in the Buenos Aires City chapter of the Justicialist Party. During the presidency of Carlos Menem he was chief of staff at the Secretariat of the Interior.

Vitobello ran for a seat in the Buenos Aires City Legislature in the 2000 local election under the Action for the Republic list, alongside, among others, Alberto Fernández. Vitobello had met Fernández earlier, during the 1999 presidential campaign of Eduardo Duhalde; they remained close associates ever since.

== Later career ==
Upon the election of Néstor Kirchner to the presidency and the appointment of Alberto Fernández as Chief of Cabinet, Vitobello resigned from the Legislature and was appointed by Fernández as his Undersecretary.

In 2007 he was appointed to the General Comptrolling Bureau of the Nation (SIGEN), replacing Claudio Moroni. In 2009 he was appointed Secretary of Public Ethics, Transparency and the Fight against Corruption (head of the Anti-Corruption Bureau) by President Cristina Fernández de Kirchner, a position he kept until Fernández de Kirchner's departure from the presidency in 2015.

Following Alberto Fernández's presidential win at the 2019 general election, Vitobello was invited to take over the General Secretariat of the Presidency, replacing Fernando de Andreis. He took office on 10 December 2019.

Political offices
Preceded by Claudio Moroni	General Comptroller of the Nation; 2007–2009	Carlos Pacios
Preceded by Abel Ortiz de Rozas	Head of the Anti-Corruption Bureau; 2009–2015	Laura Alonso
Preceded by Fernando de Andreis	General Secretary of the Presidency; 2019–2023	Succeeded by Karina Milei
