= Milei (surname) =

Milei may refer to:

- Javier Milei, the president of Argentina since 2023
- Karina Milei, Argentine politician who is the sister of Javier Milei
