= Andreis =

Andreis may refer to:

- Andreis, Italy, a comune in Friuli-Venezia Giulia
- Felix de Andreis (1778–1820), Italian-born American Catholic cleric
- Fernando de Andreis (born 1976), Argentine politician
- Anita Andreis, Croatian film composer
- Josip Andreis (1909–1982), Croatian musicologist and music historian
- Andreis family, medieval nobility from Trogir, Croatia

== See also ==
- Andrei
- Andreas
