= Sindicatura General de la Nación =

General Office of the Comptroller
- Sindicatura General de la Nación
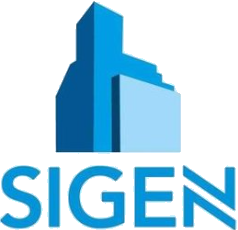

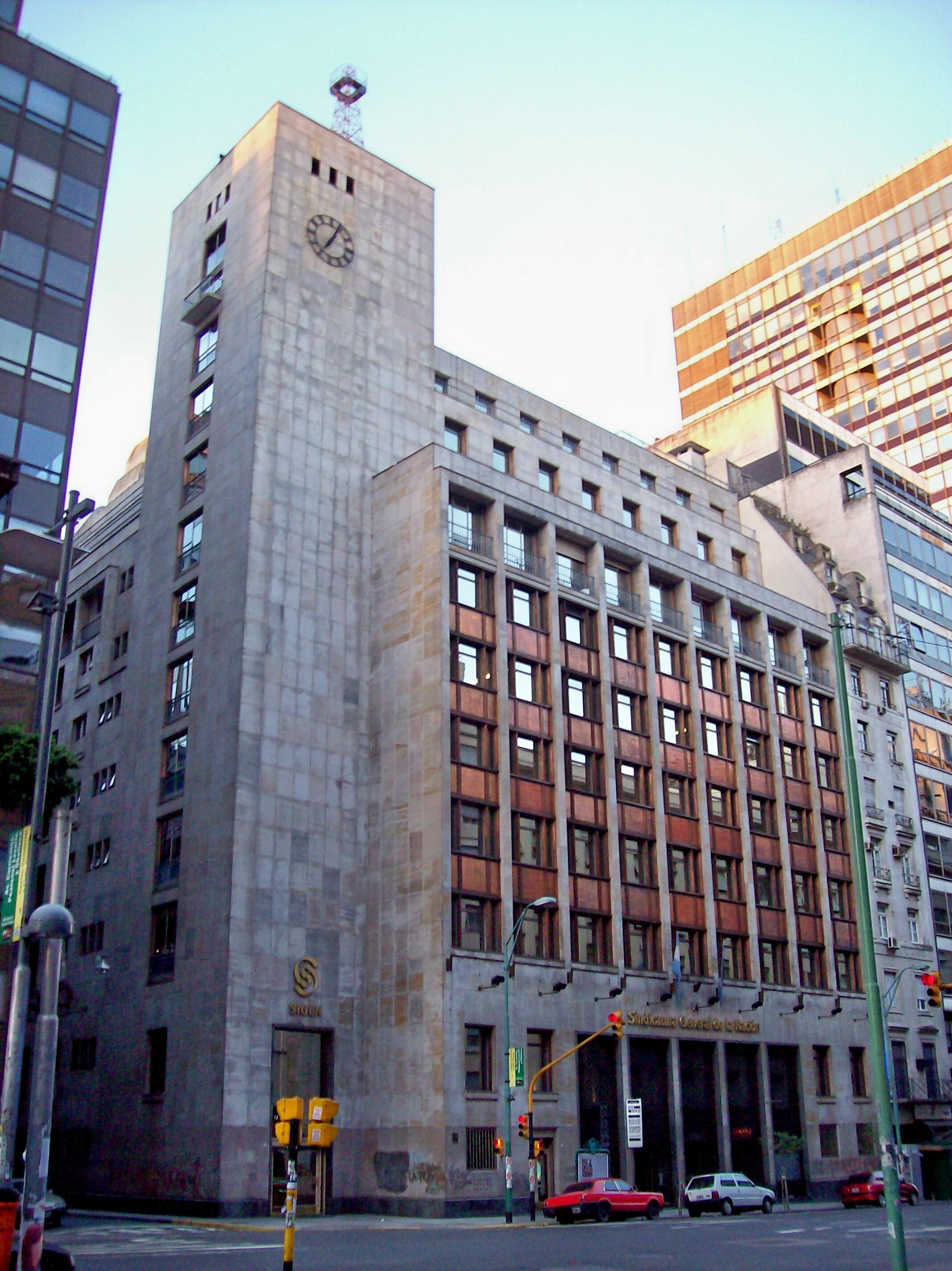
- SIGEN building in Buenos Aires

Agency overview
- Formed: 1992; 34 years ago
- Jurisdiction: Government of Argentina
- Headquarters: Buenos Aires
- Agency executive: Miguel Blanco, General Receiver
- Parent agency: Presidency of Argentina
- Website: argentina.gob.ar/sigen

The General Office of the Comptroller (Spanish: Sindicatura General de la Nación, mostly known for its acronym SIGEN) is the Argentine institution that undertakes the internal control of the Argentine economy. The agency is part of the executive branch of Argentina, and was established in 1992 by Law No. 24,156. Since 2009 it has been presided over by Daniel Gustavo Reposo.

== Overview ==
The job of SIGEN is to be an internal auditor of the National Executive Branch. It is an advisory function to the highest Government authority and depends directly on it.

Its function is different from the General Audit of the Nation (Auditoría General de la Nación, AGN) so this is a parliamentary body whose leadership is shared with the opposition parties, in accordance with their representation in the National Congress, and carries out control external, also being able to control, where appropriate, the highest national authorities.

SIGEN coordinates internal control systems at the national level, which includes compliance with accounting standards, emanating from the General Accounting Office of the Nation (CGN), legal and operational aspects. That is why we talk about a systemic and comprehensive approach. For this reason, among its various functions are those of dictating and applying internal control standards, which must be respected by the Internal Audit Units (UAI) that operate in each Ministry and independent body of the National Public Administration.

It was created in 1992 from Law 24,156.

The SIGEN is an entity directly dependent on the President of Argentina and an autonomous body, as established in article 97 of law 24,156. The General Trustee who is responsible for the entity has the rank of Secretary of the Presidency of the Nation (article 108). He is assisted by three Deputy General Trustees.

== Purposes ==
As specified on Law 24,156:

a) Dictate and apply internal control standards, which must be coordinated with the General Audit Office of the Nation; b) Issue and supervise the application, by the corresponding units, of the internal audit standards; c) Carry out or coordinate the performance by professional studies of independent auditors, of financial, legal and management audits, special investigations, financial or other types of expertise, as well as guide the evaluation of programs, projects and operations; d) Monitor compliance with accounting standards issued by the General Accounting Office of the Nation; e) Supervise the proper functioning of the internal control system, facilitating the development of the activities of the General Auditor's Office of the Nation; f) Establish technical quality requirements for the personnel of the internal audit units; g) Approve the annual work plans of the internal audit units, guide and supervise their execution and results; h) Check the implementation, by the controlled bodies, of the observations and recommendations made by the internal audit units and agreed upon with the respective managers; i) Respond to requests for advice made by the National Executive Branch and the authorities of their jurisdictions and entities regarding control and auditing; j) Formulate directly to the bodies within the scope of its competence, recommendations aimed at ensuring adequate regulatory compliance, the correct application of the internal audit rules and the criteria of economy, efficiency and effectiveness; k) Inform the President of the Nation of the acts that have caused or are deemed likely to cause significant damage to public assets; l) Maintain a central registry of auditors and consultants for the purposes of using their services; m) Exercise the functions of article 20 of Law 23,696 regarding privatizations, without prejudice to the actions of the external control entity.

== List of general receivers ==
#	Receiver	Term
1	Alberto Abad	Jan 1993 – July 1995
2	Héctor Agustini	Jul 1995 – Dec 1998
3	María Cristina Benzi	Dec 1998 – Dec 1999
4	Rafael Bielsa	Dec 1999 – Dec 2001
5	Julio Comadira	Feb 2002 – May 2003
6	Alberto Iribarne	Jun 2003 – Jul 2004
7	Miguel Ángel Pesce	Jul – Sep 2004
8	Claudio Moroni	Oct 2004 – Dec 2007
9	Julio Vitobello	Dec 2007 – Jan 2009
10	Carlos Pacios	Jan – Nov 2009
11	Daniel Reposo	Nov 2009 – Dec 2015
12	Ignacio Rial	Dec 2015 – Sep 2017
13	Alberto Gowland	Sep 2017 – Dec 2019
14	Carlos Montero	Dec 2019 – Dec 2023
15	Miguel Blanco	Dec 2023 – present
