= Claudio Moroni =

Argentine lawyer and politician

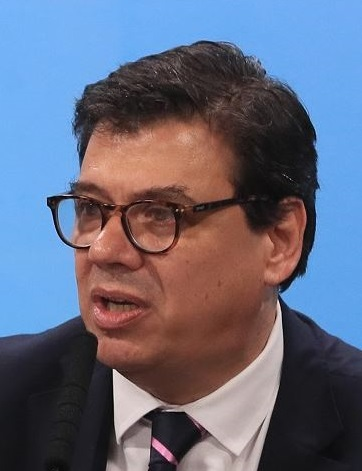

Minister of Labour
- In office 10 December 2019 – 13 October 2022
- President: Alberto Fernández
- Preceded by: Dante Sica (as Minister of Production and Labour)
- Succeeded by: Kelly Olmos

Federal Administrator of Public Income
- In office 6 May 2008 – 30 December 2008
- President: Cristina Fernández de Kirchner
- Preceded by: Carlos Rafael Fernández
- Succeeded by: Ricardo Echegaray

Executive Director of the National Social Security Administration
- In office 10 December 2007 – 6 May 2008
- President: Cristina Fernández de Kirchner
- Preceded by: Sergio Massa
- Succeeded by: Amado Boudou

General Comptroller of the Nation
- In office 8 October 2004 – 10 December 2007
- President: Néstor Kirchner
- Preceded by: Miguel Ángel Pesce
- Succeeded by: Julio Vitobello

Superintendent of Insurance
- In office 5 February 2002 – 5 October 2004
- President: Eduardo Duhalde; Néstor Kirchner
- Preceded by: Rubén Domingo Poncio
- Succeeded by: Miguel Baelo
- In office 9 December 1995 – 6 February 1998
- President: Carlos Menem
- Preceded by: Alberto Fernández
- Succeeded by: Daniel Di Nucci

Personal details
- Born: 27 May 1959 (age 67) Buenos Aires, Argentina
- Party: Justicialist Party
- Other political affiliations: Front for Victory (2003–2017); Frente de Todos (2019–2023)
- Education: University of Buenos Aires

Claudio Omar Moroni (Spanish pronunciation: [ˈklawðjo oˈmaɾ moˈɾoni]; born 27 May 1959) is an Argentine lawyer and politician who served as the country's Minister of Labour, Employment and Social Security from 10 December 2019 to 13 October 2022, in the cabinet of President Alberto Fernández.

A career public official, Moroni has held a number of positions in the Argentine national administration. He was first appointed Superintendent of Insurance by President Carlos Menem in 1995, succeeding Alberto Fernández. Since then, he has served as the General Comptroller of the Nation from 2004 to 2007, as the Executive Director of ANSES from 2007 to 2008, and as the head of AFIP for a brief period in 2008, all under the successive presidencies of Néstor Kirchner and Cristina Fernández de Kirchner.

== Early life and education ==
Moroni was born in 1959 in Buenos Aires. He studied law at the University of Buenos Aires, where he met Alberto Fernández; the two would later become close associates.

== Political career ==
In 1995, he was appointed by the administration of President Carlos Saúl Menem to the Superintendency of Insurance, succeeding Alberto Fernández. A Justicialist Party member, Moroni left the position in 1998 and would not return to public office until after the presidency of Radical Fernando de la Rúa. He returned to the position upon being appointed by Eduardo Duhalde in 2002. In 2004, President Néstor Kirchner appointed Moroni to the General Comptrolling Bureau (SIGEN), succeeding Miguel Ángel Pesce; he would remain in charge of the SIGEN until 2007.

Upon the renovation of authorities following the ascension of President Cristina Fernández de Kirchner, Moroni left the SIGEN and was appointed Executive Director of the National Social Security Administration (ANSES), where he remained until 2008; from then he was appointed Federal Administrator of Public Income, but was removed from that position merely six months afterwards.

In addition to his work in the public sector, Moroni also served as a director of the executive board of Banco Provincia Group and as an insurance advisor in the Inter-American Development Bank.

=== Ministry of Labour ===
On 10 December 2019, following speculation that he might be appointed to the newly restored Ministry of Labour, Employment and Social Security, Moroni was appointed to the cabinet by newly elected President Alberto Fernández, succeeding Dante Sica.

He resigned on 13 October 2022 for health reasons, and was succeeded by Raquel Olmos.

Political offices
Preceded by Alberto Fernández	Superintendent of Insurance; 1995–1998	Succeeded by Daniel Di Nucci
Preceded by Rubén Domingo Poncio	Superintendent of Insurance; 2002–2004	Succeeded by Miguel Baelo
Preceded by Miguel Ángel Pesce	General Comptroller of the Nation; 2004–2007	Succeeded by Julio Vitobello
Preceded by Sergio Massa	Executive Director of ANSES; 2007–2008	Succeeded by Amado Boudou
Preceded by Carlos Rafael Fernández	Federal Administrator of Public Income; 2008–2008	Succeeded by Ricardo Echegaray
Preceded by Dante Sica	Minister of Labour; 2019–2022	Succeeded by Kelly Olmos
