= Laura Alonso (politician) =

Argentine politician (born 1972)

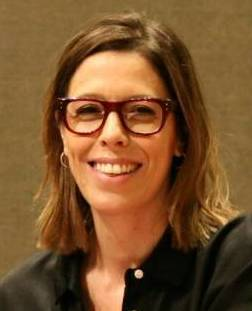

Secretary of Public Ethics, Transparency and the Fight against Corruption
- In office 10 December 2015 – 10 December 2019
- Preceded by: Julio Vitobello
- Succeeded by: Felix Crous

National Deputy
- In office 10 December 2009 – 10 December 2015
- Constituency: City of Buenos Aires

Personal details
- Born: 23 December 1972 (age 53) Buenos Aires, Argentina
- Party: Republican Proposal
- Other political affiliations: Cambiemos
- Education: Universidad de Buenos Aires

Laura Alonso (born 23 December 1972) is an Argentine politician who served as head of the Anti-Corruption Bureau of Argentina from 2015 to 2019 during the presidency of Mauricio Macri. She also served as member of the Chamber of Deputies from 2009 to 2015. Previously, she was Executive Director of Poder Ciudadano, the Argentine chapter of Transparency International.

== Early life and education ==
Laura Alonso was born and raised in Buenos Aires, Argentina, and graduated with a degree in political science from the University of Buenos Aires Faculty of Social Sciences. She also holds a master's degree in public administration and public policy from the London School of Economics and Political Science.

She is a Chevening Scholar, an Eisenhower Fellow, a Stanford Draper Hills Fellow, a Reagan-Fascell Fellow at the National Endowment for Democracy and a Yale World Fellow.

== Political career ==
=== Poder Ciudadano ===
After graduating, Alonso joined the staff of Poder Ciudadano (Citizen Power), a government watchdog organization and the Argentine chapter of Transparency International. She was later promoted to Executive Director. During her tenure at Poder Ciudadano, she helped promote open government policies as well as monitoring of judicial corruption and government influence over the media.

=== Legislative ===
Alonso was elected in the 2009 elections as National Deputy for the City of Buenos Aires under the Republican Proposal ticket, alongside Gabriela Michetti, among others.

As a legislator, Alonso introduced the Ley de Transparencia, Gobierno Abierto y Acceso a La Información Pública (Transparency, Open Government and Access to Public Information Law) with the goal of increasing government transparency by giving citizens access to public information. She also drafted legislation on judicial and criminal reforms, electoral issues and gender parity, including a bill to ensure salary parity for Argentine workers. In 2008, she was awarded the Vital Voices Global Leadership Award for her work in combating corruption and promoting good governance.

In 2012, she was selected Young Global Leader by the World Economic Forum.

By then a known name in Argentine media for her crusade against corruption and confrontations with Kirchnerite officials, Alonso became notorious in 2015 for her friendship with Alberto Nisman, a federal prosecutor who was found dead days before publishing a 288-page report with incriminating evidence on then-president Cristina Fernández de Kirchner's involvement in the 1994 AMIA bombing cover-up. Alonso later testified in Nisman's murder trial where she showed her message exchanges with the late prosecutor, in which he expressed being in fear for his life.

=== Anti-Corruption Bureau ===
In December 2015, president Mauricio Macri appointed Alonso as head of the Anti-Corruption Bureau (OA). The appointment was criticized by the opposition for not meeting the requirement of being a lawyer as required for the office. Macri signed a presidential decree that modified this obligation and established as a requirement "to have a university degree, solid academic background, qualified professional background in law, social sciences or economics and a recognized democratic and republican career."

During her time at the AO, the agency published more than 90 thousand affidavits regarding assets from officials of the Executive Branch and legislators in the National Public Data Portal within the Ministry of Modernization.

In 2018, Alonso was chair of the G-20 Anti-Corruption Working Group.

==== Laws enacted ====
During her tenure at the AO, the following bills and decrees were enacted, among others:

- Whistleblower Act: Adds the possibility of reducing or exempting penalties from those who provide "accurate, verifiable and useful information to avoid the consummation or continuation of a crime; help clarify the fact under investigation or other related; reveal the identity of co-authors, participants or coverts of the investigated or other related facts, or the intervention of other persons." It was made into a law in October 2016 by the National Congress.
- Corporate Liability Law: Its main purpose is to prevent corruption through the implementation of integrity programs that encourage the collaboration of the private sector in the investigation of corruption; it seeks to follow the standards in transparency promoted by the Organisation for Economic Co-operation and Development (OECD). During the debate on the law, Alonso requested that the so-called "Odebrecht clause" be re-included in the bill, which allowed companies to reach an agreement with the Attorney General in order to reduce a penalty in exchange for information on previous crimes.
- Integrity Decrees in Trials against the State and Public Procurement: These are two additional transparency tools in which the President of the Nation and other government authorities are self-limited in cases of lawsuits against the State and public procurement related to them. For the elaboration of these decrees, the Anti-Corruption Bureau carried out a participatory consultation process that included contributions from non-governmental organizations and the general public through the Internet.

==== Judicial causes intervened ====
The Anti-Corruption Bureau intervened as a complainant in more than 35 cases for corruption offenses within the scope of the Federal Government, including the 2012 Buenos Aires rail disaster, the Hotesur, Ciccone and Qunita scandals; the trials against Lázaro Báez, Carlos Liuzzi, José López, Amado Boudou and César Milani, as well as a case of bribes and kickbacks in the Ministry of Health.

==== Controversies ====
During 2016, Alonso's first year in charge of the Bureau, more than 22,000 public officials did not submit their sworn statement forms. The Anti-Corruption Bureau was criticized for emitting complaints in this regard only against opponents of the government of which it is a part, for which it was charged with "manifest bias" and accused of using its function "to prosecute adversaries."

She was also accused of non-compliance with her duties and functions as head of the AO for alleged infractions committed by former Energy Minister Juan José Aranguren, accused of conflict of interest for signing deals that benefited the Royal Dutch Shell oil company, of which he was shareholder and former CEO of its Argentine division. Alonso replied by saying that "having shares in a company is not necessarily a conflict of interest. This is why we ask all officials in those cases to delegate decisions." In September 2016, the AO decided to recommend that Aranguren must detach himself from his Shell shares as well as let him know that in matters related to the company he must refrain from intervening and designate an official in his replacement.

== Electoral history ==
Electoral history of Laura Alonso
Election	Office	List	#	District	Votes			Result	Ref.
Election	Office	List	#	District	Total	%	P.	Result	Ref.
2009	National Deputy	Republican Proposal Alliance	5	City of Buenos Aires	567,695	31.19%	1st (Note: Presented on an electoral list. The data shown represents the share of the vote the entire party/alliance received in that constituency.)	Elected	
2013	National Deputy	PRO Union	3	City of Buenos Aires	630,595	34.46%	1st	Elected	
2025	City Legislator	Buenos Aires First	3	City of Buenos Aires	261,595	15.92%	3rd	Elected	

Political offices
Preceded by Julio Vitobello	Head of the Anti-Corruption Bureau; 2015–2019	Succeeded by Felix Crous
