= Superintendency of Insurance (Argentina) =

Regulatory agency of the Government of Argentina

Superintendency of Insurance of the Nation
- Superintendencia de Seguros de la Nación
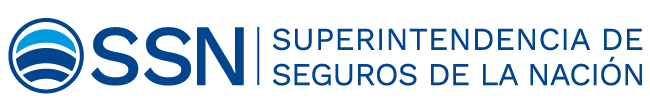

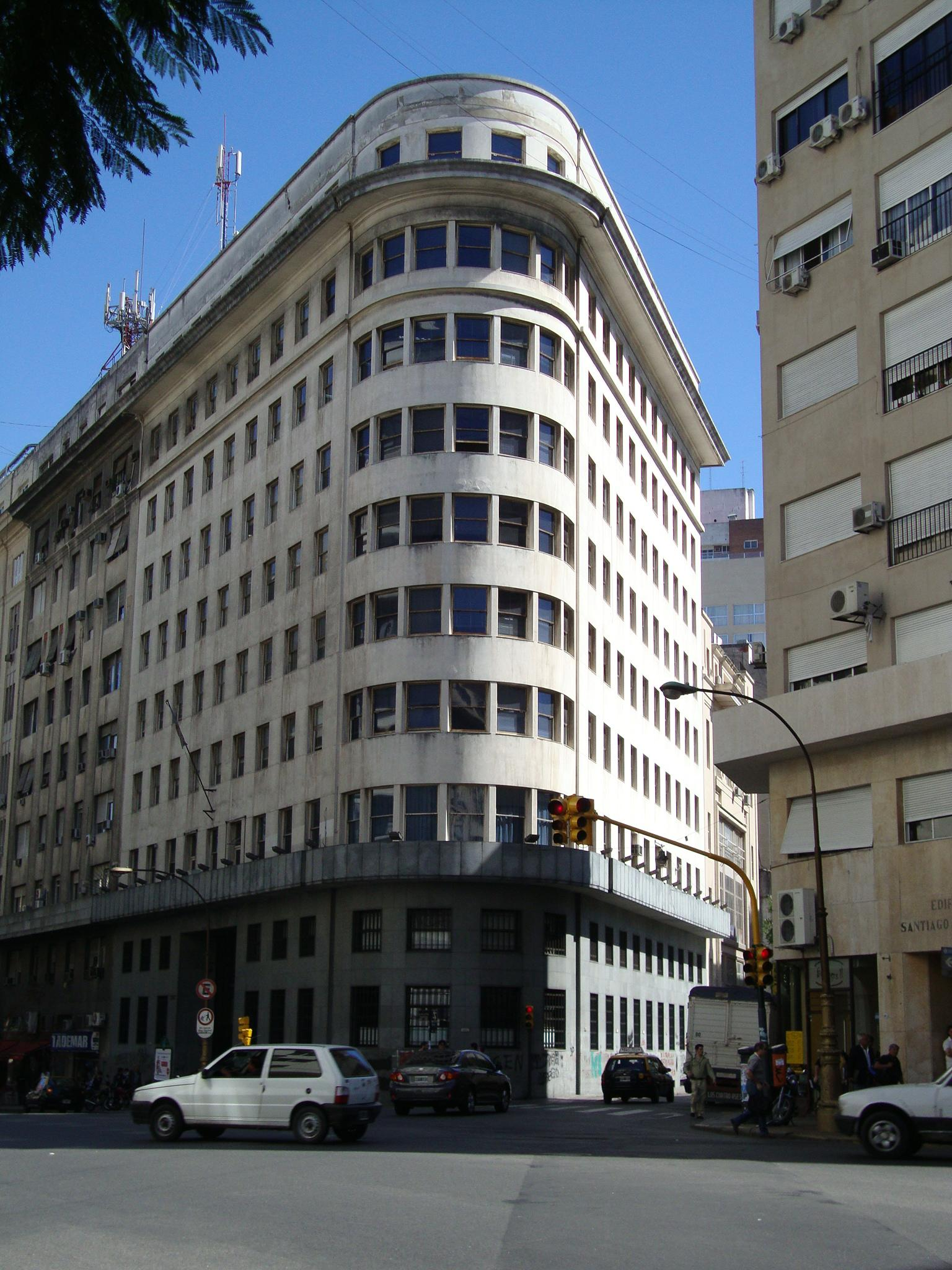
- Headquarters in Buenos Aires

Agency overview
- Type: Regulatory agency
- Jurisdiction: Argentina
- Headquarters: Buenos Aires
- Annual budget: $ 1,534,049,002 (2021)
- Agency executive: Guillermo Plate, Superintendent
- Parent agency: Ministry of Economy
- Website: argentina.gob.ar/superintendencia

The Superintendency of Insurance of the Nation (Spanish: Superintendencia de Seguros de la Nación, abbrevriated SSN) is a regulatory agency of the Government of Argentina, reporting to the Ministry of Economy, that oversees insurance companies. The Superintendency was created in 1937 through a presidential decree of President Agustín Pedro Justo.

== List of superintendents ==
No.	Superintendent	Term
Superintendency of Insurance (1937–1944)
1	Luis César Sáenz	21 June 1937 – 16 November 1943
2	Silverio Vegega	17 November 1943 – 7 June 1944
General Directorate of Insurance (1944–1955)
3	Amaro Avalos	8 June 1944 – 18 January 1945
4	Bernabé Pistarini	19 January 1945 – 8 October 1945
5	Justo Carasales Costa	9 January 1945 – 6 December 1946
6	Julio Miguel Valle	7 December 1946 – 26 June 1952
7	Angel Benito Vuolo	27 June 1952 – 27 July 1954
8	Jorge Peña	25 August 1954 – 10 November 1955
Superintendency of Insurance (1955–present)
9	Félix Gabriel Bordelois	11 November 1955 – 30 June 1958
10	Nelio Benito Cattáneo	1 July 1958 – 8 June 1961
11	Héctor Nicolás Masse	9 June 1961 – 21 October 1963
12	José Enrique Bruchou	22 October 1963 – 5 July 1966
13	Augusto José Vázquez	6 July 1966 – 14 June 1973
14	Miguel Antonio Peláez	15 June 1973 – 14 April 1976
15	Marcelo Gowland Acosta	15 April 1976 – 5 October 1981
16	Víctor Adrián Spitaleri	6 October 1981 – 12 January 1982
17	Eduardo Alberto Toribio	13 January 1982 – 6 October 1982
18	Ismael Alchourron	7 October 1982 – 3 January 1983
19	Oscar Luis Crosetto	4 January 1983 – 6 March 1986
20	Diego Pedro Peluffo	3 March 1986 – 31 July 1989
21	Alberto Fernández	1 August 1989 – 8 December 1995
22	Claudio Moroni	9 December 1995 – 10 February 1998
23	Daniel Di Nucci	11 February 1998 – 21 February 2000
24	Ignacio Warnes	21 February 2000 – 9 April 2001
25	Juan Pablo Chevallier Boutell	10 April 2001 – 30 November 2001
26	Rubén Domingo Poncio	1 December 2001 – 4 February 2002
27	Claudio Moroni	5 February 2002 – 5 October 2004
28	Miguel Baelo	6 October 2004 – 13 January 2009
29	Gustavo Marcelo Medone	13 January 2009 – 4 November 2010
30	Francisco Durañoña	5 November 2010 – 10 December 2011
31	Juan Bontempo	10 December 2011 – 10 December 2015
32	Edgardo Isaac Podjarny	11 December 2015 – 14 January 2017
33	Juan Pazo	14 April 2017 – 21 February 2020
34	Adriana Guida	21 February 2020 – Jan 2024
35	Guillermo Plate	Jan 2024 – present

== See also ==
- Financial regulation
- Economy of Argentina
- List of financial supervisory authorities by country
