= Order of Ipiranga =

Order of Ipiranga Ordem do Ipiranga
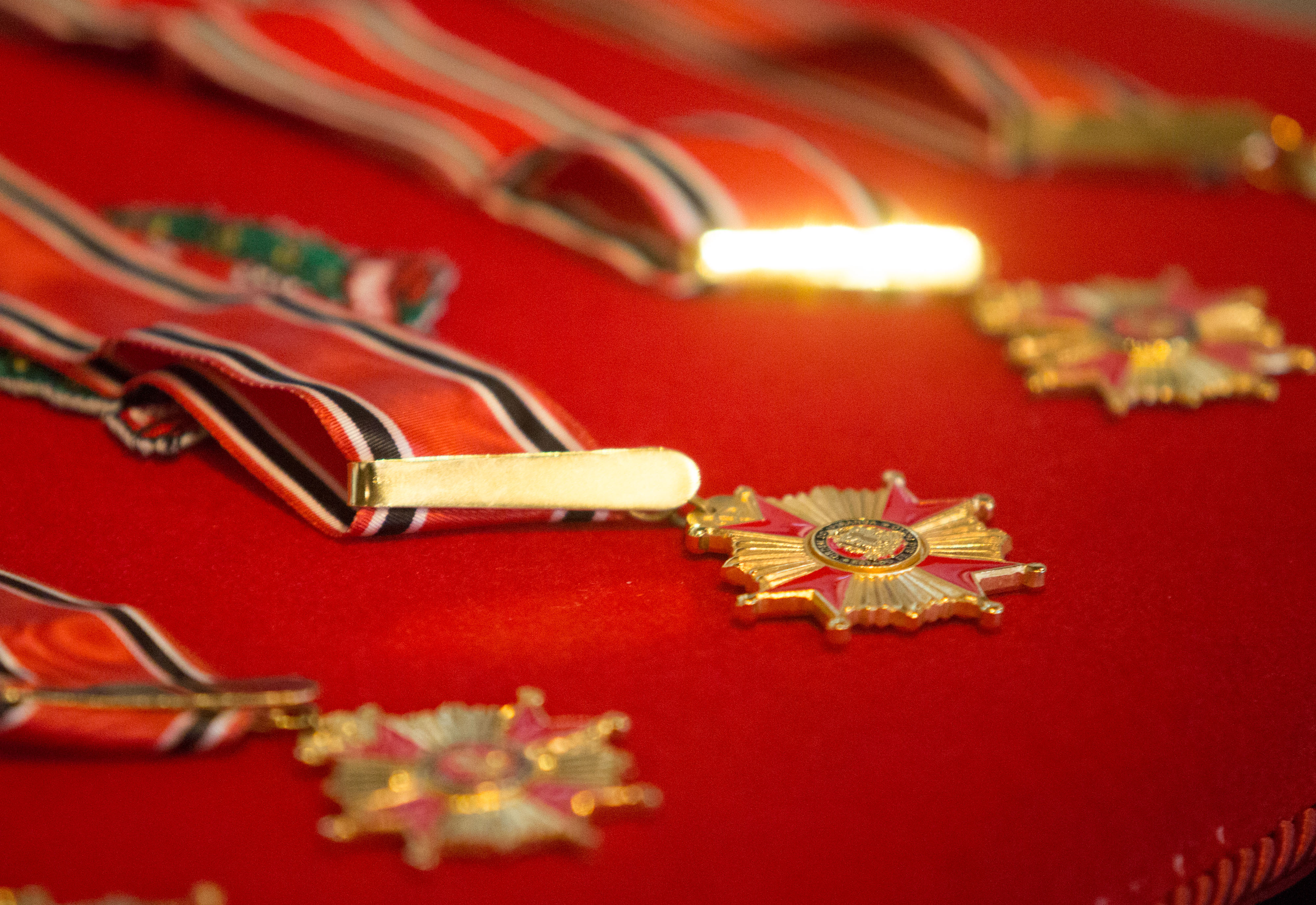

Awarded by the state government of São Paulo
- Type: State order
- Motto: Independence or death ("Independência ou Morte")
- Eligibility: Brazilian and foreign personalities
- Awarded for: people, artistic groups, initiatives or institutions in the form of recognition of their contributions to the people of São Paulo
- Status: currently awarded
- Grades: Grand Cross (Grã-cruz); Grand Officer (Grande-Oficial); Commander (Comendador); Officer (Oficial); Knight (Cavaleiro)
- Ribbon of the order

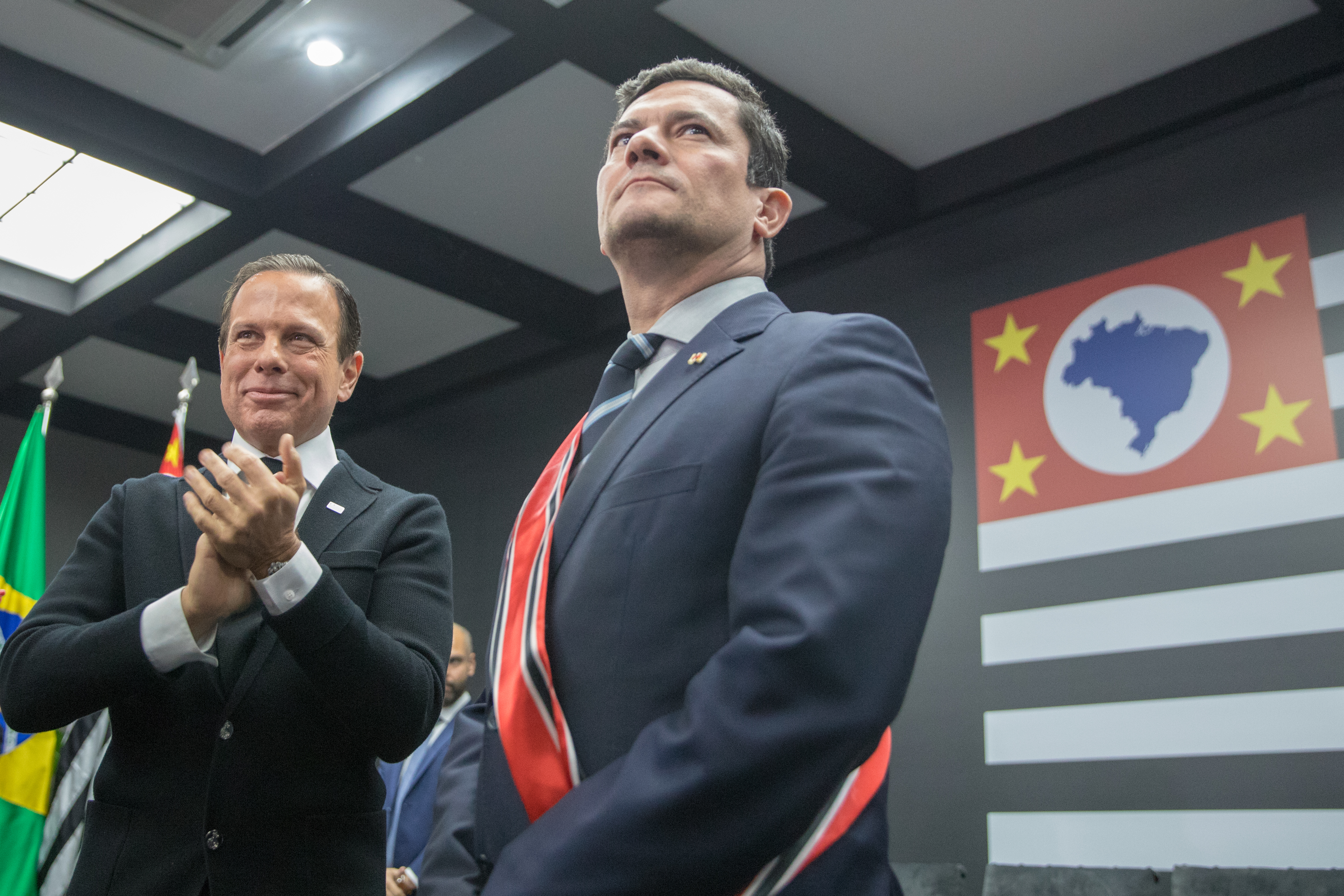
Former São Paulo governor João Doria and then Minister of Justice Sergio Moro during the award ceremony for the Order of Ipiranga.

The Order of Ipiranga (Portuguese: Ordem do Ipiranga) is the highest state honor that is awarded by the state government of São Paulo. The award is bestowed onto Brazilian citizens or foreigners that show exemplary service to the people of São Paulo. The order was instituted by decree nº 52.064 on 20 June 1969 and regulated by decree nº 52.078 since 24 June 1969. Both decrees were made by then-governor Abreu Sodré. The motto of the order, "Independence or death" (Portuguese: "Independência ou Morte"), comes from the Cry of Ipiranga made by Dom Pedro I during the Brazilian War of Independence.

== Honors ==
- Grand Cross (Grã-cruz)
- Grand Officer (Grande-Oficial)
- Commander (Comendador)
- Officer (Oficial)
- Knight (Cavaleiro)

== Notable recipients ==
- 2025 - Japan, Princess Kako of Akishino
- 2024 - (Argentina) Karina Milei, sister of Argentine president Javier Milei
- 2023 - Santiago Peña, President-elect of Paraguay
