= Luciano Laspina =

Argentine politician

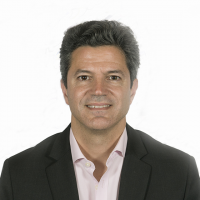

National Deputy
- Incumbent
- Assumed office 24 February 2015
- Constituency: Santa Fe

Personal details
- Born: 8 August 1972 (age 54) Rosario, Argentina
- Party: Republican Proposal
- Other political affiliations: Juntos por el Cambio (2015–2023)
- Education: National University of Rosario
- Occupation: Economist

Luciano Laspina (born 8 August 1972) is an Argentine politician who has served as a National Deputy of Argentina elected in Santa Fe Province since 2015. He is a member of Republican Proposal (PRO).

== Biography ==
Laspina was born on 8 August 1972 in Rosario, Santa Fe. He completed a licenciatura degree on economics at the National University of Rosario.

== Electoral history ==
Electoral history of Luciano Laspina
Election	Office	List	#	District	Votes			Result	Ref.
Election	Office	List	#	District	Total	%	P.	Result	Ref.
2013	National Deputy	Federal Santa Fe PRO Union	4	Santa Fe Province	516,444	27.20%	2nd (Note: Presented on an electoral list. The data shown represents the share of the vote the entire party/alliance received in that constituency.)	Not elected (Note: Assumed office on 23 December 2019 following the resignation of Miguel del Sel.)	
2017	National Deputy	Cambiemos	2	Santa Fe Province	743,139	37.80%	2nd	Elected	
2021	National Deputy	Juntos por el Cambio	12	Santa Fe Province	733,360	38.59%	1st	Elected	
