= Carolina Scotto =

Argentine academic, philosopher, politician (born 1958)

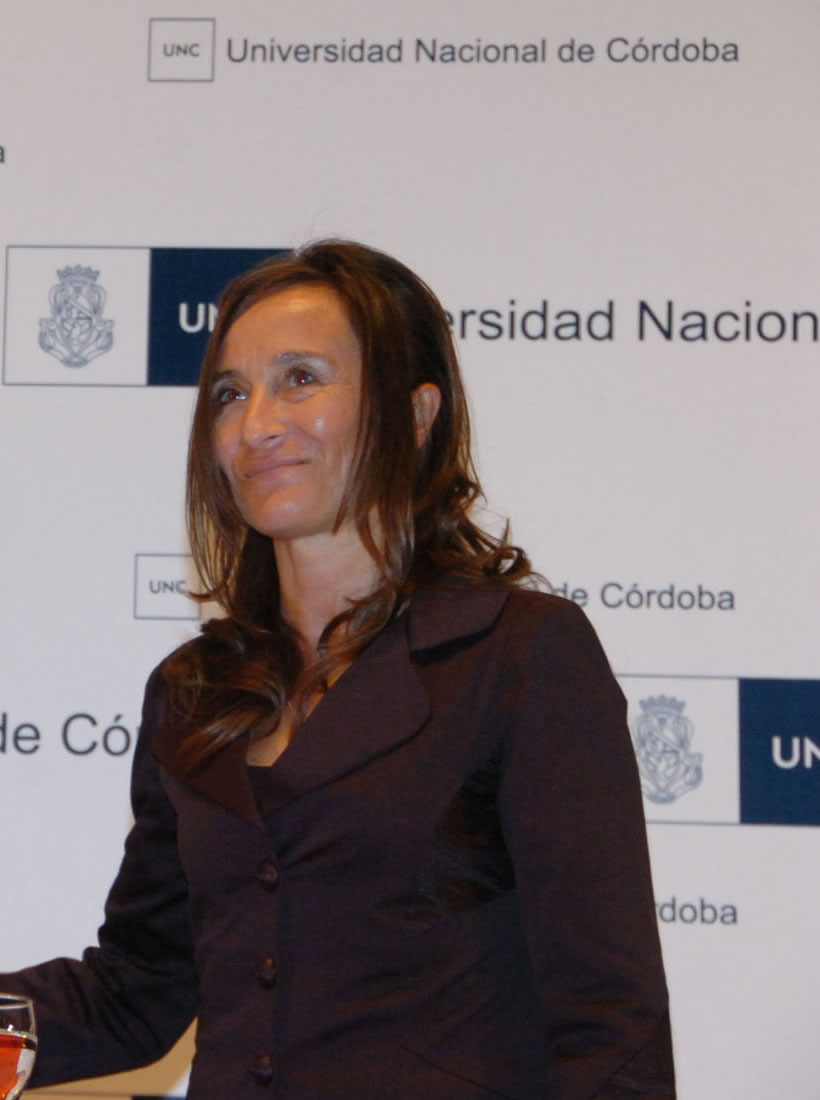
Carolina Scotto (2008)

Silvia Carolina Scotto (born, 18 March 1958) is an Argentine history professor, with degrees in philosophy and politics. In 2007, she became the first woman to take over as rector of the National University of Córdoba, in an institution that is more than 400 years old. In 2013, she was elected a member of the Argentine Chamber of Deputies for the Front for Victory in the Córdoba Province. On 6 August 2014, she resigned for "strictly personal reasons".
