= Karina Milei =

Argentine politician (born 1972)

- Milei in 2024

General Secretary of the Presidency
- Incumbent
- Assumed office 10 December 2023
- President: Javier Milei
- Vice President: Victoria Villarruel
- Preceded by: Julio Vitobello

Personal details
- Born: Karina Elizabeth Milei; 28 March 1972 (age 54) Buenos Aires, Argentina
- Citizenship: Argentina; Italy (since 2024)
- Party: Parties: Libertarian (2019–2024); La Libertad Avanza (since 2024)
- Other political affiliations: Coalitions: La Libertad Avanza (since 2021)
- Relatives: Javier Milei (brother)
- Education: Argentine University of Enterprise (BA); University of Belgrano (BA)

Karina Elizabeth Milei (Note: Spanish pronunciation: [kaˈɾina eˈlisaβet miˈlej]) (born 28 March 1972) is an Argentine politician who has served as General Secretary of the Presidency of the Argentine Nation since December 2023. She was appointed by her older brother, President of Argentina Javier Milei, having managed his successful presidential campaign. Javier often refers to her as "The Boss" ("El Jefe" in Spanish, using the male form of the noun instead of the feminine "La Jefa"), always highlighting her as one of his main advisors. She has also been the president of La Libertad Avanza since its foundation in September 2024.

== Life and career ==
She was born in Buenos Aires in 1972, two years after her brother, Javier Milei. They are the only children of the marriage of Norberto Milei and Alicia Lucich. Javier remained distant from his parents, with Karina being his only family member with whom he maintained contact for many years. According to CNN and the BBC, Javier suffered from bullying and domestic violence. Karina was at that time the only psychological support during his childhood. Despite the hermeticism of Karina, in some interviews Javier confirmed some aspects of his relationship with her. He stated that their father subjected him to severe beatings and he tried to seek protection from his sister. Javier compared his sister with Moses, stating: "She is Moses, I am just a popularizer".

She holds a degree in public relations from the Argentine University of Enterprise and also studied marketing at the University of Belgrano. Before she participated in politics with her brother, she was his finance manager. Karina also studied to be a pastry chef, sculptor and tarot reader, activities that she did as hobbies and work.

The nomination of Karina as General Secretary of the Presidency on 10 December 2023, was made possible after Javier was inaugurated as President on the same day, and one of his first acts was the modification of a decree, that was passed by his predecessor Mauricio Macri, which prohibited the nomination of relatives of the President to Cabinet positions.

After seven months in office, her approval rating, published monthly by the University of San Andres, was 56.1% negative and 35.5% positive.

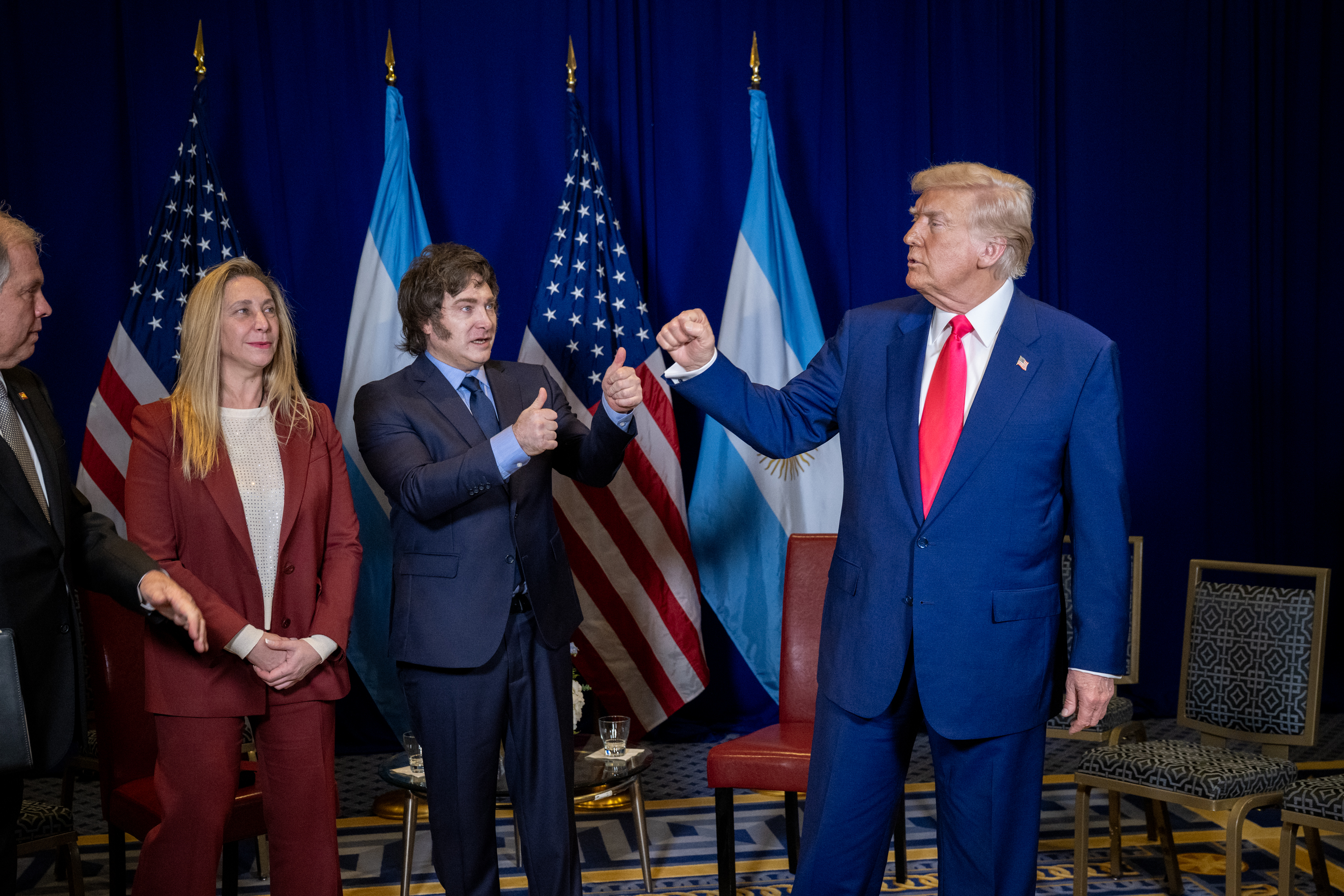
Milei with her brother Javier and Donald Trump in February 2025

In February 2025, Hayden Mark Davis, a key figure behind the cryptocurrency $Libra, alleged that he had bribed Karina Milei to influence her brother’s decisions. Moreover, Davis, issued a statement in which he claimed to have been an advisor to the Argentine government. He asserted that government officials had assured him they would support the project, and described the government’s decision to delete its endorsement post as abrupt, further stating that Libra’s investors felt betrayed by this development.

She has no children nor a known partner. Her interest in esotericism, as well as her relationship with her brother Javier, rumors about her influence on him, on his political career and on his political positions, have attracted a lot of media attention in Argentina.

== Controversies ==
=== Spagnuolo audio scandal ===
In August 2025, audio recordings were made public in the mass media in which the head of ANDIS, Diego Spagnuolo, who had also served as lawyer to President Javier Milei, alleged acts of corruption reaching the highest levels of the executive branch. In the recordings, Karina Milei was mentioned and accused of receiving a kickback of 3% from medications purchased by ANDIS. Other officials mentioned included Martín Menem, president of the Chamber of Deputies of Argentina, and Eduardo "Lule" Menem, a subordinate of Karina Milei. Spagnuolo was removed from his post at ANDIS and the government intervened in the institution. Argentine authorities seized Spagnuolo's mobile phones and carried out raids on the main pharmaceutical supplier involved, Suizo Argentina. At the same time, the existence of additional recordings allegedly involving Karina Milei was announced.

The fact-checking organization Chequeado commissioned a technical analysis from the specialized consultancy BlackVOX, which, using the software Forensia, compared the recordings with Spagnuolo's public records on YouTube and concluded that there was "strong evidence" of correspondence between the two voices.

The national government prohibited the dissemination of the recordings and denounced an alleged international intelligence operation involving local journalists and even the governments of Russia and Venezuela. The prohibition on dissemination of the recordings was also denounced by the parliamentary opposition as a case of censorship.

The audio scandal generated major national and international repercussions that affected Karina Milei's role in her brother's government.

==== Judicial proceedings ====
Relationship diagram in the alleged ANDIS kickback case.

On 21 August 2025, attorney Gregorio Dalbón filed a criminal complaint following the dissemination of the audio recordings attributed to Diego Spagnuolo. The case was assigned to Federal Criminal and Correctional Court No. 11, under federal judge Sebastián Casanello, with prosecutor Franco Picardi involved in the proceedings. In that context, searches were ordered and telephones and other electronic devices were seized. The investigation continued under seal until 18 September, when the restriction was lifted.

On 1 September, federal civil and commercial judge Patricio Maraniello issued a precautionary measure ordering "the immediate cessation of the dissemination" of the recordings in which Karina Milei was mentioned, both in the media and on social networks. The ruling held that the disclosure constituted "a serious violation of institutional privacy". On 18 September, when the seal was lifted, the parties were able to access the court file. At that stage, a report by the Directorate General for Investigations and Technological Support (DATIP) stated that Spagnuolo had deleted messages from his mobile phone and had attempted to access his WhatsApp account from another device before handing over the handset to the court. As part of the file, the prosecution incorporated the witness statement of businessman Luis Cella, who acknowledged efforts to have Prevent S.A. included as a supplier to the Incluir Salud program and described an alleged scheme of agreements among pharmaceutical distributors to fix prices and divide patients among themselves. The testimony was accompanied by emails exchanged with Diego Spagnuolo that, according to the prosecutorial filing, reflected tensions over the exclusion of the company and possible coordination among suppliers in the sector.

On 18 November, official Ornella Calvete—then National Director for Regional and Sectoral Development at the Ministry of Economy and the government's representative on the Special Customs Area Commission—tendered her resignation after her name appeared in the case. The measure came after a search of her home in which US$700,000 was seized, the origin of which could not be justified at that time. At the same time, her father, Miguel Ángel Calvete, identified by the prosecution as an informal intermediary with direct ties to Spagnuolo and various pharmaceutical distributors, was summoned for questioning but refused to testify before Casanello and prosecutor Picardi. The filing places him as one of the central figures in the alleged scheme, with influence over the agency's decisions and direct contact with suppliers in the sector.

At this stage, prosecutor Picardi also detailed various indications that would implicate Spagnuolo, including alleged money movements linked to Calvete, an unjustified increase in wealth, the existence of undeclared foreign currency and the submission to the court of a phone with deleted information. During the search of his home, a bill-counting machine was also found, which was considered relevant to the investigation. On 19 November, Diego Spagnuolo was summoned for questioning at the federal courts in Comodoro Py. The former ANDIS director appeared before Judge Casanello and prosecutor Picardi, but refused to testify and did not answer questions, although he informally denied the acts imputed to him. His lawyer, Mauricio D'Alessandro, publicly argued that the recordings attributed to Spagnuolo had been "manipulated with artificial intelligence" and that the defense had submitted an expert report allegedly showing this, a position that will be examined in judicial proceedings. According to the prosecutorial filing, Spagnuolo played a "key" role in the alleged scheme of steering purchases, improper payments and financial maneuvers within the agency, and maintained an operational relationship with Miguel Ángel Calvete and other defendants.

== Honours ==
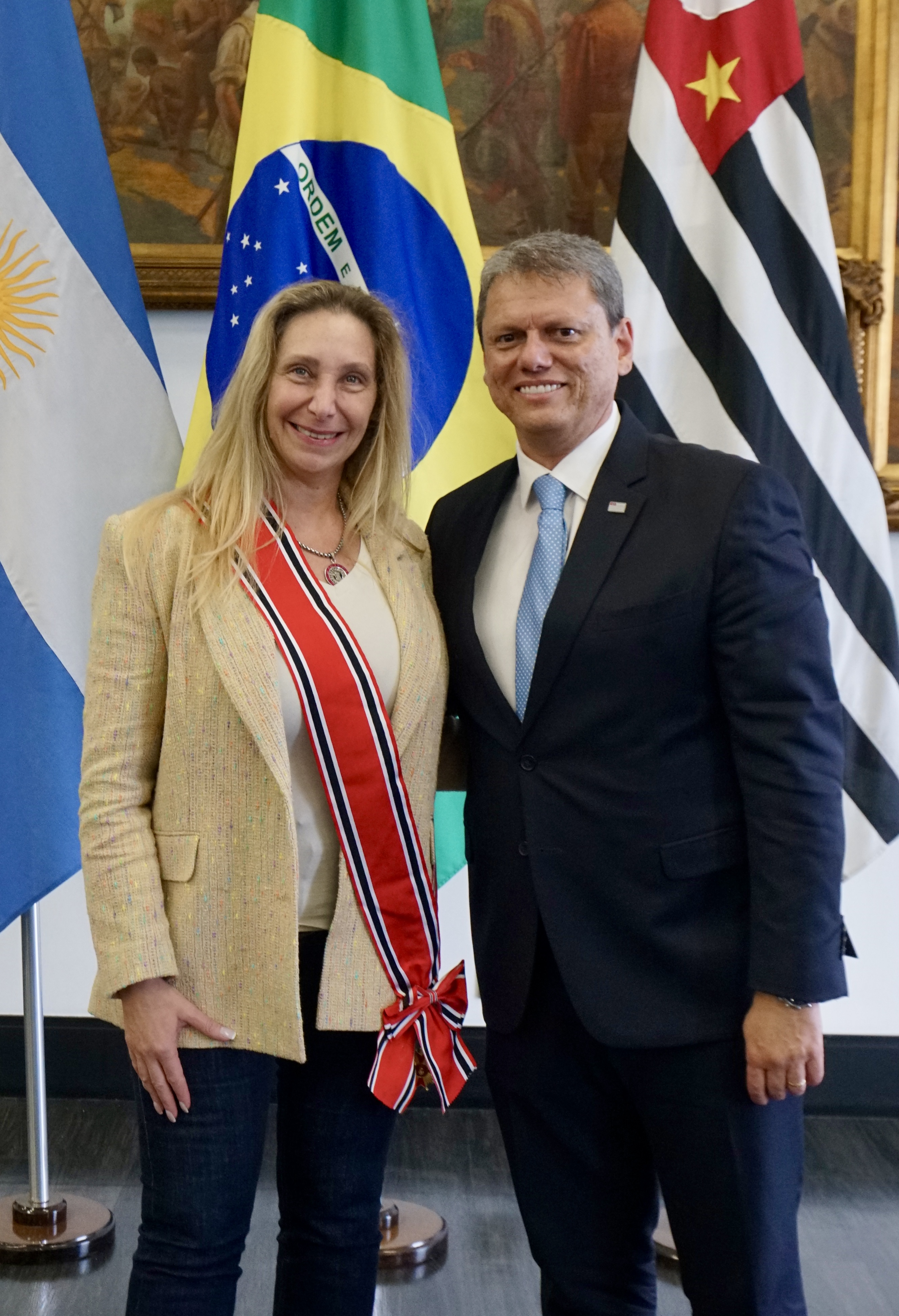
Milei being awarded with the Grand Cross of the Order of Ipiranga with São Paulo governor Tarcísio de Freitas in December 2024

- Brazil:
  - São Paulo:
    - Grand Cross of the Order of Ipiranga (3 December 2024)
