= Eduardo de Pedro =

Argentine lawyer and politician

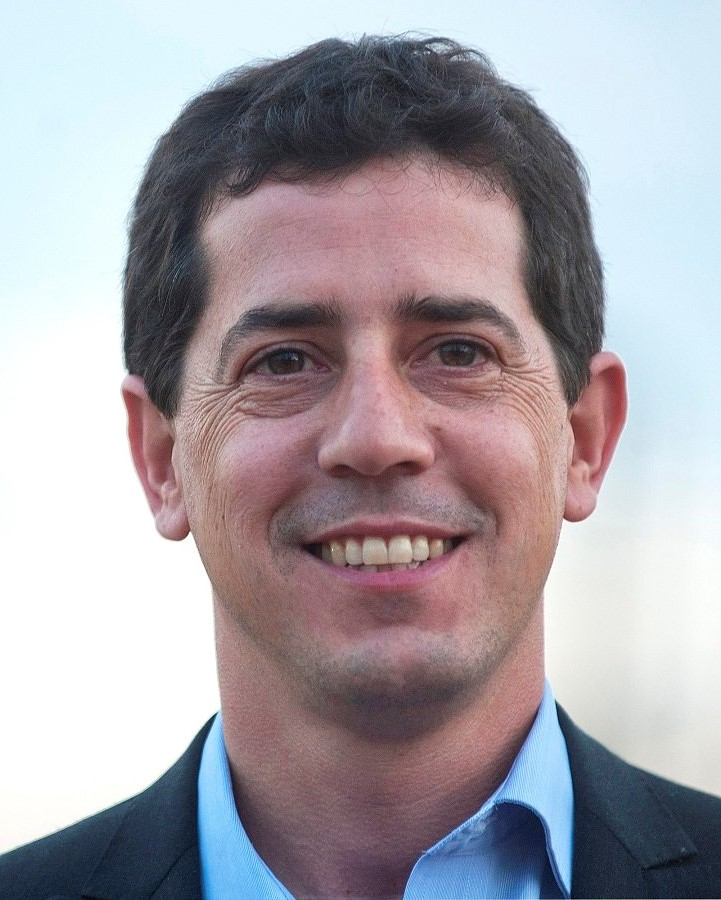

National Senator
- Incumbent
- Assumed office 10 December 2023
- Constituency: Buenos Aires

Minister of the Interior
- In office 10 December 2019 – 10 December 2023
- President: Alberto Fernández
- Preceded by: Rogelio Frigerio
- Succeeded by: Guillermo Francos

Councillor of Magistracy
- In office 21 November 2018 – 10 December 2019
- Appointed by: Chamber of Deputies
- In office 4 February 2014 – 26 February 2015
- Appointed by: Chamber of Deputies

National Deputy
- In office 10 December 2015 – 10 December 2019
- Constituency: Buenos Aires
- In office 10 December 2011 – 26 February 2015
- Constituency: Buenos Aires

General Secretary of the Presidency
- In office 26 February 2015 – 10 December 2015
- President: Cristina Fernández de Kirchner
- Preceded by: Aníbal Fernández
- Succeeded by: Fernando de Andreis

Personal details
- Born: 11 November 1976 (age 50) Mercedes, Buenos Aires Province, Argentina
- Party: Justicialist Party
- Other political affiliations: Front for Victory (2003–2017); Citizen's Unity (2017–2019); Frente de Todos (2019–2023); Unión por la Patria (2023–present)
- Education: University of Buenos Aires; University of San Andrés

Eduardo Enrique "Wado" de Pedro (Spanish pronunciation: [eˈðwaɾðo enˈrike ðe ˈpeðɾo]; born 11 November 1976) is an Argentine lawyer and Justicialist Party politician who has served as National Senator since 2023. He previously served as the country's Minister of the Interior from 2019 to 2023, National Deputy for Buenos Aires Province, as member of the Council of Magistracy, and General Secretary to President Cristina Fernández de Kirchner.

De Pedro was one of the founding members of La Cámpora, the Front for Victory's youth wing. He served as Vice-president of Aerolíneas Argentinas and Austral Líneas Aéreas from 2009 to 2011.

== Early life and education ==
Eduardo Enrique de Pedro was born on 11 November 1976 in Mercedes, in Buenos Aires Province. His father, Eduardo Osvaldo de Pedro (b. 1950), a law student at the University of Buenos Aires and a member of the terrorist organization Montoneros, was killed by the last military dictatorship in Argentina in 1977. His mother, Lucila Adela Révora (b. 1953) was kidnapped by state authorities in 1978 while pregnant. Her name is mentioned in the Nunca Más report. The two-year-old Eduardo Enrique was thereafter raised by his aunt Estela Révora.

De Pedro has had a stutter since childhood. Like his father, de Pedro studied law at the University of Buenos Aires, and then went on to receive a Master's Degree in public policy at the University of San Andrés. He is a founding member of HIJOS.

== Political career ==
De Pedro's political career began in 2004 when he was designated Chief of Cabinet of the Undersecretariat of Tourism of Buenos Aires City, during the administration of Aníbal Ibarra. In 2006, alongside Máximo Kirchner, Andrés Larroque, Juan Cabandié, Mariano Recalde and José Ottavis, de Pedro co-founded La Cámpora, a youth political organization that acted as the youth wing of the Front for Victory. In 2009, he was appointed to the board of the recently re-nationalized Aerolíneas Argentinas and Austral Líneas Aéreas.

In 2011 he was elected to the Chamber of Deputies on the Front for Victory list, representing Buenos Aires Province. Representing the majority bloc in the Chamber, de Pedro was designated as member of the Council of Magistracy of the Nation in February 2014.

On 26 February 2015 he was designated as General Secretary of the Presidency under President Cristina Fernández de Kirchner, a post he held until 10 December 2015, when Fernández de Kirchner's term ended. De Pedro headed the Front for Victory's deputies party list in Buenos Aires Province in the 2015 legislative election, and in 2018 he was again designated as one of the Chamber's representatives to the Council of Magistracy, this time representing the minority bloc.

From 10 December 2019 until 10 December 2023, he served in the cabinet of President Alberto Fernández as Minister of the Interior.

== Electoral history ==
Electoral history of Eduardo de Pedro
Election	Office	List	#	District	Votes			Result	Ref.
Election	Office	List	#	District	Total	%	P.	Result	Ref.
2011	National Deputy	Front for Victory	6	Buenos Aires Province	4,639,554	57.10%	1st (Note: Presented on an electoral list. The data shown represents the share of the vote the entire party/alliance received in that constituency.)	Elected	
2015	National Deputy	Front for Victory	1	Buenos Aires Province	3,354,619	37.28%	1st	Elected	
2023	National Senator	Union for the Homeland	1	Buenos Aires Province	4,135,519	44.01%	1st	Elected	

Political offices
Preceded by Aníbal Fernández	General Secretary of the Presidency; February 2015–December 2015	Succeeded by Fernando de Andreis
Preceded by Rogelio Frigerio	Minister of the Interior; 2019–2023	Succeeded by Guillermo Francos
