= Popular Unity (Argentina) =

Argentine political party

Popular Unity Unidad Popular
- President: Claudio Lozano
- Founded: 19 June 2010; 15 years ago
- Headquarters: Av. Entre Ríos 902, Buenos Aires
- Membership (2017): ▲19,456
- Ideology: Socialism of the 21st century Progressivism; Left-wing nationalism Latin American integration
- Political position: Left-wing
- National affiliation: Homeland Force
- Colors: Blue
- Seats in the Chamber of Deputies: 0 / 257
- Seats in the Senate: 0 / 72

Website
- Official website

Popular Unity (Spanish: Unidad Popular; UP), officially registered as the Electoral Instrument for Popular Unity (Spanish: Instrumento Electoral por la Unidad Popular) is a left-wing nationalist political party in Argentina, founded by trade union leader and former CTA secretary-general Víctor De Gennaro in 2010. It was part of the Frente de Todos, the coalition formed in 2019 to support the presidential candidacy of Alberto Fernández. It is now part of the Union for the Homeland which was formed to support Sergio Massa's 2023 presidential campaign. From 2011 to 2013 it was part of the Broad Progressive Front (FAP).

The party presently has no representation at the federal level; UP's De Gennaro and Claudio Lozano both sat in the Argentine Chamber of Deputies until 2015. De Gennaro ran an unsuccessful presidential campaign at the 2015 general election. It is, as of 2025, led by Lozano.

== History ==
In 2010, the Electoral Instrument for Popular Unity (UP) party was established, in the Province of Buenos Aires, with which De Gennaro was a member of the Broad Progressive Front that led to Hermes Binner as presidential candidate in 2011.

The national elections of that year gave the FAP the second place in the country, and Víctor De Gennaro the entry as national deputy for Buenos Aires. After his inauguration in the Congress of the Argentine Nation, De Gennaro along with Claudio Lozano, Graciela Iturraspe, Liliana Parada and Antonio Riestra make up the Popular Unity Bloc, which in turn was part of the Frente Amplio Progresista interblock. This agreement lasted until 2013, when some FAP parties promoted the entry of the UCR to the front, a situation that Unidad Popular did not accept and declared the Frente Amplio Progresista dissolved and the Frente Amplio UNEN was formed subsequently.

After this rupture, the party chaired by De Gennaro forms the Front, in alliance with the Labor and People Party (PTP) and the Socialist Workers Movement (MST), a front that in Buenos Aires nominated teacher Marta Maffei for national deputy.

Already in 2014, with his allies from the PTP, and with new parties such as Emancipación Sur and Camino de los Libres, Víctor de Gennaro formalized his candidacy for President of the Nation for the 2015 general elections, in the so-called Popular Front, but de Gennaro failed to pass the electoral threshold and was subsequently excluded from the first round.

== Electoral performance ==
=== President ===
Election year	Candidate	Coalition	PASO		1st round		Result
Election year	Candidate	Coalition	# of overall votes	% of overall vote	# of overall votes	% of overall vote	Result
2011	Hermes Binner	FAP	2,180,110	9.72 (4th)	3,684,970	16.81% (2nd)	✗ Defeated
2015	Víctor De Gennaro	FP	106,324	0.47 (7th)	—N/a		✗ Failed to pass threshold
2019	Alberto Fernández	FDT	12,205,938	47.79 (1st)	12,473,709	48.10 (1st)	✓ Elected
2023	Juan Grabois	UP	1,441,504	5.85 (7th)	—N/a		✗ Failed to pass threshold

=== Chamber of Deputies ===
Election year	Votes	%	seats won	total seats	position	presidency	notes
2011	2,780,984	13.52 (2nd)	3	3 / 257	Minority	Cristina Fernández de Kirchner (PJ—FPV)	within the FAP
2013	330,260	1.39	0	3 / 257	Minority	Cristina Fernández de Kirchner (PJ—FPV)	within provincial alliances
2015	106,324	0.47	0	0 / 257	Minority	Mauricio Macri (PRO—Cambiemos)	within the Popular Front
2017	28,858	0.12 (26th)	0	0 / 257	Minority	Mauricio Macri (PRO—Cambiemos)	
2019	11,950,926	46.61 (1st)	0	0 / 257	Minority	Alberto Fernández (PJ—FDT)	within FDT
2023	9,298,491	37.88%	0	0 / 257	Minority	Javier Milei (PL—LLA)	within UP
