= General Secretariat of the Presidency =

Argentine government official

- Secretaría General de la Presidencia
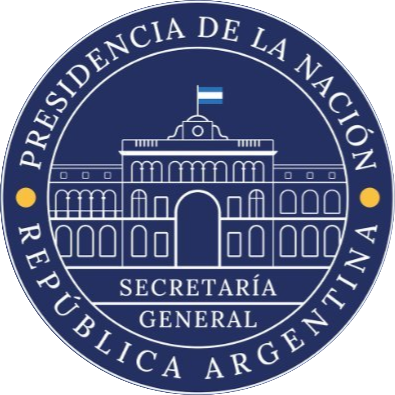

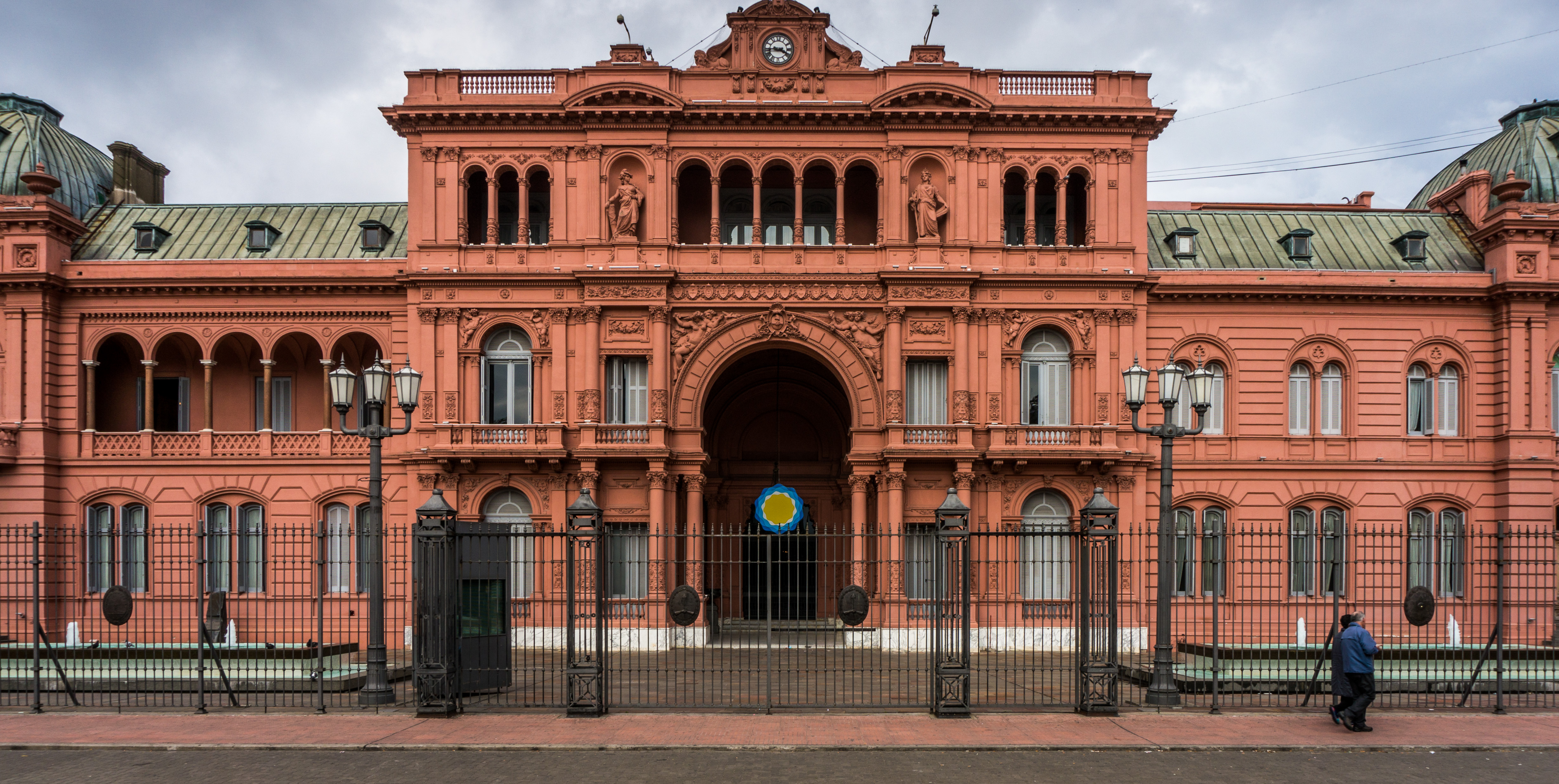
- Casa Rosada, government house of Argentina

Secretariat overview
- Formed: April 23, 1976; 50 years ago
- Type: Secretariat of State
- Jurisdiction: Argentina
- Headquarters: Casa Rosada, Buenos Aires
- Annual budget: $ 46,282,428.345 (2021)
- Secretariat executive: Karina Milei, General Secretary of the Presidency
- Parent department: Presidency of the Nation
- Website: argentina.gob.ar/secretariageneral

The General Secretariat of the Presidency of the Argentine Nation (Spanish: Secretaría General de la Presidencia de la Nación Argentina; SGP) is a secretariat of state of the Argentine National Executive counting with ministerial level, tasked with assisting the President of Argentina in the making of public policy, drafting messages and public speeches, maintaining the presidential protocol and overseeing the relationship between the President and society at large.

The General Secretariat also oversees a number of centralized and decentralized agencies as defined by the Law on Ministries, which may be updated at the President's behest. Since 10 December 2023, the General Secretary of the Presidency has been Karina Milei, who serves under President Javier Milei.

It is one of (currently) three secretariats in the Argentine government counting with ministerial level, the other being the Legal and Technical Secretariat and the Secretariat of Communications and Press.

== Attributions and organization ==
The 1983 Law on Ministries (Spanish: Ley de Ministerios), decreed by Raúl Alfonsín, established eight secretariats reporting directly to the Office of the President tasked to delegate some of the President's direct responsibilities whilst aiding the head of state in the elaboration of public policies, among other responsibilities. These included, alongside the General Secretariat of the Presidency, the Legal and Technical Secretariat, the Planning Secretariat, the Intelligence Secretariat (SIDE, later disestablished and reformed into the AFI), the Media Secretariat, the Public Affairs Secretariat, the Science and Technology Secretariat, the Secretariat of Comprehensive Policies on Drugs (SEDRONAR) and the Habitat Secretariat.

Since 2001, the General Secretariat of the Presidency has ministerial rank, and as such, the General Secretary may issue ministerial decrees.

== Headquarters ==
The General Secretariat is entirely headquartered in the Casa Rosada, the official working residence of the President of Argentina. In addition, the General Secretary also has responsibilities and jurisdiction over the Quinta de Olivos.

== List of secretaries ==
No.	Secretary	Party	Term	President
1	Germán López	Radical Civic Union	10 December 1983 – 9 February 1986	Raúl Alfonsín
2	Carlos Becerra	Radical Civic Union	9 February 1986 – 8 July 1989	Raúl Alfonsín
3	Alberto Kohan	Justicialist Party	8 July 1989 – 20 September 1990	Carlos Menem
4	Eduardo Bauzá	Justicialist Party	20 September 1990 – 8 July 1995	Carlos Menem
5	Alberto Kohan	Justicialist Party	8 July 1995 – 10 December 1999	Carlos Menem
6	Jorge de la Rúa	Radical Civic Union	10 December 1999 – 23 October 2000	Fernando de la Rúa
7	Carlos Becerra	Radical Civic Union	23 October 2000 – 20 March 2001	Fernando de la Rúa
8	Nicolás Gallo	Radical Civic Union	20 March 2001 – 20 December 2001	Fernando de la Rúa
8	Luis Lusquiños	Justicialist Party	23 December 2001 – 30 December 2001	Adolfo Rodríguez Saá
9	Aníbal Fernández	Justicialist Party	2 January 2002 – 3 October 2002	Eduardo Duhalde
10	José Pampuro	Justicialist Party	3 October 2002 – 25 May 2003	Eduardo Duhalde
11	Oscar Parrilli	Justicialist Party	25 May 2003 – 10 December 2007	Néstor Kirchner
11	Oscar Parrilli	Justicialist Party	10 December 2007 – 16 December 2014	Cristina Fernández de Kirchner
12	Aníbal Fernández	Justicialist Party	16 December 2014 – 26 February 2015	Cristina Fernández de Kirchner
13	Eduardo de Pedro	Justicialist Party	26 February 2015 – 10 December 2015	Cristina Fernández de Kirchner
14	Fernando de Andreis	Republican Proposal	10 December 2015 – 10 December 2019	Mauricio Macri
15	Julio Vitobello	Justicialist Party	10 December 2019 – 10 December 2023	Alberto Fernández
16	Karina Milei	Libertarian Party	10 December 2023 – present	Javier Milei
