= Fernando de Andreis =

Argentine politician (born 1976)

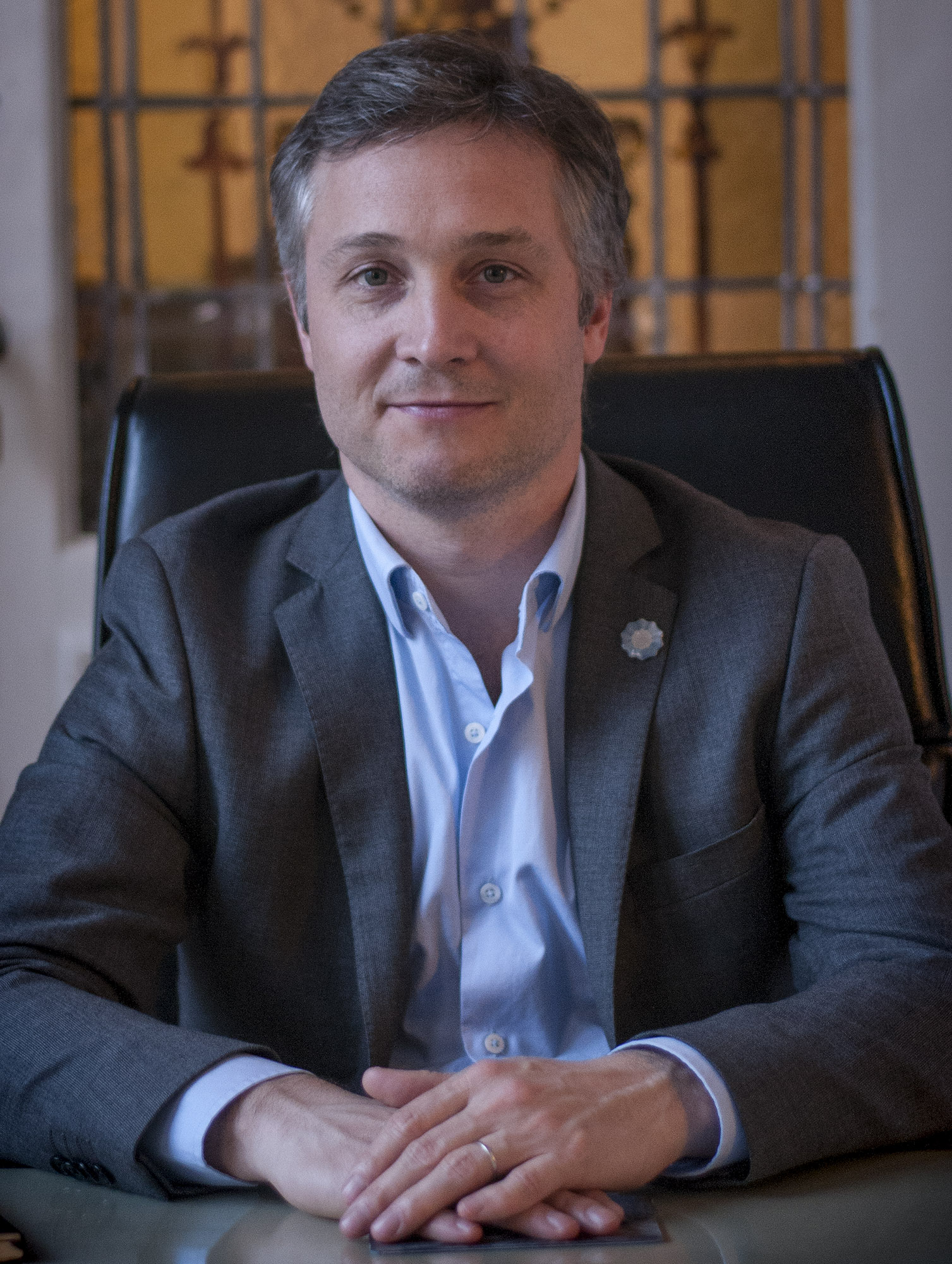

National Deputy
- Incumbent
- Assumed office 10 December 2025
- Constituency: City of Buenos Aires

General Secretary of the Presidency
- In office 10 December 2015 – 10 December 2019
- President: Mauricio Macri
- Preceded by: Eduardo de Pedro
- Succeeded by: Julio Vitobello

Legislator of the City of Buenos Aires
- In office 10 December 2007 – 10 December 2011

Personal details
- Born: 10 January 1976 (age 50) Buenos Aires, Argentina
- Party: Republican Proposal
- Other political affiliations: Cambiemos (2015–2019)
- Education: University of Buenos Aires

Fernando de Andreis (born 10 January 1976) is an Argentine politician who served as General Secretary of the Presidency of the Nation (2015–2019), designated by President Mauricio Macri.

Since 2025 he has been a National Deputy for the City of Buenos Aires.

== Early life and education ==
Fernando de Andreis was born in Buenos Aires on 10 January 1976. His father died before his birth, and his mother, Patricia Langan, later married Juan Manuel Bordeu, a car racer, who adopted him and raised him along with her daughter Ivonne Bordeu, President Mauricio Macri's first wife. He holds a degree in Business Administration from the University of Buenos Aires and has been a member of the Republican Proposal (PRO) since 2002.

== Politics ==
His political career began as a collaborator of Marcos Peña, the current Chief of Minister, in the Creer y Crecer Foundation in 2002. He was one of its chief advisors, as well as organizer of PRO youth at the request of Peña. He served as Legislator of the City of Buenos Aires, elected in 2007, replacing Peña and again in 2009, was head of the Republican Proposal block since 2011, and then President of the City of Buenos Aires Tourism Authority, assuming in the position on 11 December 2013. He was head of the campaign to head of government of Horacio Rodríguez Larreta in 2015.

After the presidential elections of 2015, he was appointed General Secretary of President Mauricio Macri. In this capacity, he managed the relations of the presidency with the Argentine Football Association (AFA) and the Fútbol para todos program established by Cristina Kirchner, of state-sponsored broadcasting of soccer matches. The AFA was in a state of turmoil since the death of Julio Grondona. De Andreis criticized the high expense of the Fútbol para todos program for the state, the lack of a system of checks and balances in the soccer institutions, and the political meddling of the previous administration into the soccer affairs.

Political offices
Preceded by Eduardo de Pedro	General Secretary of the Presidency; 2015–2019	Succeeded by Julio Vitobello
