= Miguel del Sel =

Argentine politician and humorist (born 1957)

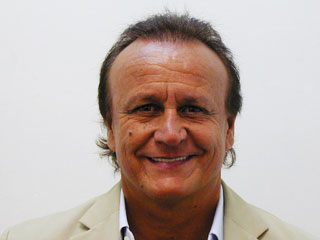

Personal details
- Born: 3 July 1957 (age 68) Santa Fe, Argentina
- Party: Republican Proposal
- Other political affiliations: Cambiemos (national); Union PRO Federal (provincial)
- Profession: Humorist

Miguel Ignacio Torres del Sel (born 3 July 1957) is an Argentine politician and humorist, who has been National Deputy of Argentina representing Santa Fe province between 2013 and 2015. He belongs to Propuesta Republicana party. The president Mauricio Macri designated him Argentine Ambassador to Panama between 2015 and 2017. He was also candidate to governor of Santa Fe in the 2011 and 2015 elections, but he was defeated by candidates of Socialist Party in both.

He was born in Santa Fe and was very interested in sports and studied physical education. Before his career in politics, he was a famous humorist as part of Midachi, a group well known in Argentina, with Dady Brieva and Darío Volpato. In 2017 he announced his retirement from politics to again be part of the group.
