= Felix de Andreis =

Italian-born American Catholic cleric (1778–1820)

Servant of God Felix de Andreis CM
- Born: 12 December 1778; Demonte, Cuneo, Italy
- Died: 17 October 1820 (aged 41); St. Louis, Missouri, United States

Felix de Andreis, CM (December 12, 1778 – October 15, 1820) was an Italian-born American Catholic missionary who served as the first provincial superior of the Congregation of the Mission (Vincentians) in the United States and as Vicar General of Upper Louisiana, based in St. Louis.

Andreis was born in northern Italy. His early theology teaching career was at the College of the Propaganda in Rome, a school that trained priests for mission work.

Louis Dubourg recruited Andres to America in 1815, to work in the Missouri Territory. He arrived in St. Louis in 1817 and was granted enslaved African Americans by Dubourg to assist with his work. Later appointed vicar general by Dubourg, Andreis also directed several educational and spiritual endeavors, including acting as spiritual director of Rose Philippine Duchesne.

Theologians approved Andreis' spiritual writings on April 15, 1917, and the cause for his beatification was formally opened on July 25, 1918, granting him the title of Servant of God.
