= Anti-Corruption Bureau (Argentina) =

Argentine government agency

The Anticorruption Bureau (Spanish: Oficina Anticorrupción; OA) of Argentina is a division of the Argentine federal government tasked with auditing the country's public sector and introducing public policies oriented towards preventing political corruption. It is formally a decentralized agency reporting to the Ministry of Justice and Human Rights.

The bureau was created in 1999, as part of the inaugural measures of president Fernando de la Rúa. The Bureau is led by the Secretary of Public Ethics, Transparency, and the Fight against Corruption. Since 2019, Félix Crous has held the position.

== See also ==
- Corruption in Argentina
- Interior Security System
