= Mónica Schlotthauer =

Argentine union leader and politician

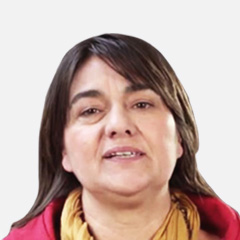

National Deputy
- In office 10 June 2021 – 10 December 2021
- Constituency: Buenos Aires
- In office 4 April 2019 – 10 December 2019
- Constituency: Buenos Aires

Provincial Deputy of Buenos Aires
- In office 14 December 2016 – 10 December 2017
- Constituency: Third Electoral Section

Personal details
- Born: 22 August 1963 (age 62) Isidro Casanova, Buenos Aires Province, Argentina
- Party: Socialist Left
- Other political affiliations: Workers' Left Front (2011–present)
- Profession: Railway worker and union leader

Mónica Leticia Schlotthauer (born 22 August 1963) is an Argentine railway worker and union leader who served as a member of the Argentine Chamber of Deputies elected in Buenos Aires Province on three occasions, from April to December 2019, from June to December 2021, and from June 2024 to date. Schlotthauer is a member of Socialist Left, a Trotskyist political party organized within the Workers' Left Front.

== Early life and career ==
Schlotthauer was born on 22 August 1963 in Isidro Casanova, a city in La Matanza Partido, in the Greater Buenos Aires conurbation. Raised Roman Catholic, she became an atheist as a teenager and joined the Socialist Workers' Party toward the end of the last military dictatorship in Argentina (1976–1986).

She was a union delegate in the Sanatorio Antártida hospital, in Buenos Aires, until she was fired during the administration of Carlos Menem. In 2005, she left for Venezuela to support the National Workers' Union, until she was forced to return to Argentina due to economic limitations. Upon her return, she became a janitor in the Mitre Line, and later transferred to the Sarmiento Line. She became active in the railway workers' union in the Lista Bordó, led by Rubén Sobrero.

== Political career ==
Schlotthauer ran for a seat in the Buenos Aires Province Chamber of Deputies in 2015 general election for the Workers' Left Front (FIT); although she was not elected, she took office on 14 December 2016 due to the FIT's seat rotation agreement, succeeding the Workers' Party's Guillermo Kane.

Consequently, in 2015, Schlotthauer was the third candidate in the FIT list to the Argentine Chamber of Deputies in Buenos Aires Province; although the list received only 4.46% of the vote and Schlotthauer was not elected, she took office on 4 April 2019 following the resignation of Nathalia González Seligra. She served until 10 December 2019.

Schlotthauer ran for re-election in 2019; she was, again, not elected. She was sworn in for a second time on 10 June 2021 following the resignation of Nicolás del Caño as per the rotation agreement. Alongside Juan Carlos Giordano, also of Socialist Left, she formed part of the Socialist Left bloc in the Chamber of Deputies, the first time the small party counted with more than one deputy in Congress.

She again became a national deputy, as part of rotation by the Workers' Left Front, in June 2024, along with Vanina Biasi.
