= Nathalia González Seligra =

Argentine politician

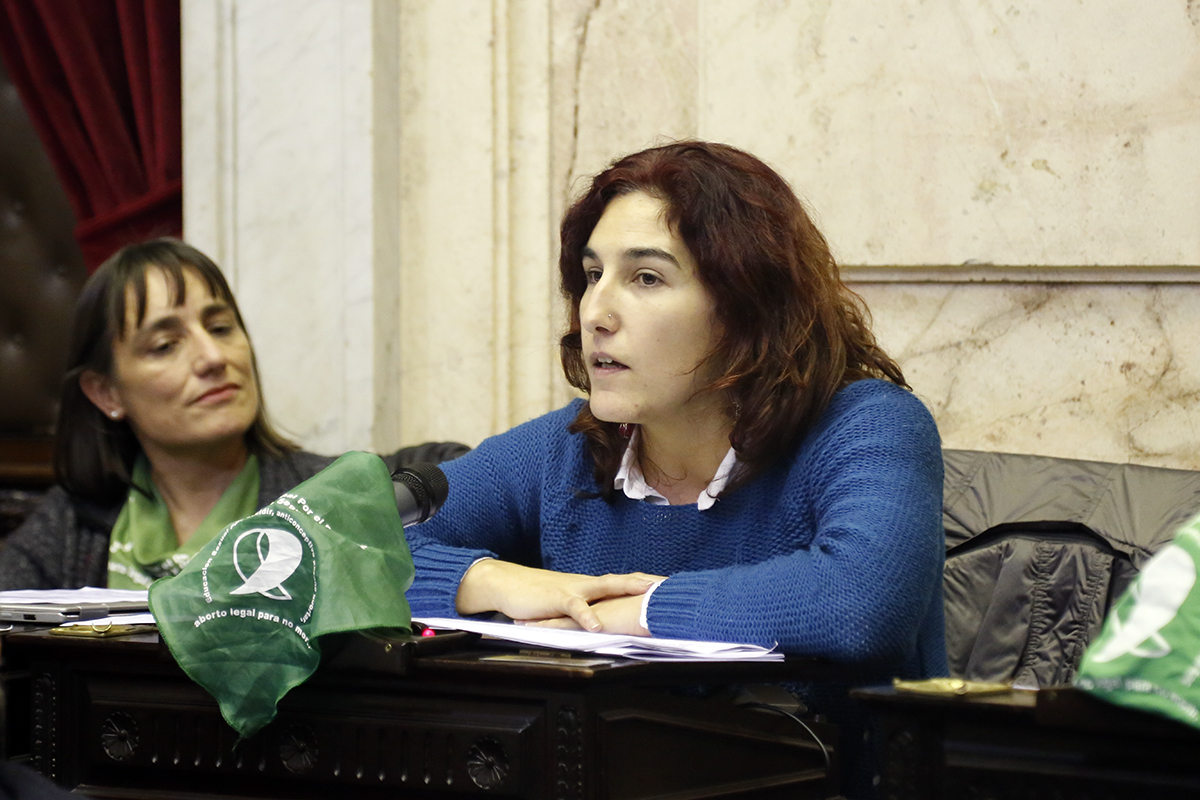

National Deputy
- In office 21 June 2017 – 4 April 2019
- Constituency: Buenos Aires

Personal details
- Born: Nathalia Inés González Seligra; 31 January 1979 (age 47) Stockholm, Sweden
- Party: Socialist Workers' Party
- Other political affiliations: Workers' Left Front (2011–present)
- Education: University of Buenos Aires

Nathalia Inés González Seligra (born 31 January 1979) is an Argentine teacher and politician who was a National Deputy from 2017 to 2019 for the Socialist Workers' Party (PTS).

== Early life and education ==
González Seligra was born on 31 January 1979 in Stockholm, Sweden, to Argentine parents who had fled the country's last civic–military dictatorship (1976–1983) and had been detained-disappeared in Uruguay.

She studied high school at the Escuela Esteban Echeverría in Ramos Mejía, Buenos Aires Province, and studied sociology at the University of Buenos Aires Faculty of Socal Sciences, graduating with a licenciatura in 2007.

== Political career ==
Gonzáles Seligra's political activism began in high school, where she joined her school's students' union and protested against the Federal Education Law supported by then-governor Felipe Solá. Concurrently, she joined HIJOS, the association of children of people disappeared during the 1976–1983 dictatorship in Argentina.

She joined the Socialist Workers' Party (PTS) in 2007. Additionally, she became involved in Pan y Rosas, the PTS's feminist wing. That year she also began her involvement in trade union politics; following the 2013 elections in the Single Union of Education Workers of Buenos Aires (SUTEBA), González Seligra became part of the Human Rights directive board of the union.

Ahead of the 2015 general election, González Seligra was part of the Workers' Left Front (FIT) list of candidates to the Argentine Chamber of Deputies for Buenos Aires Province. The list only received enough votes to secure one seat in the Chamber of Deputies (Néstor Pitrola, of the Workers' Party), but due to the seat rotation agreement between the FIT's member parties, in 2017 Pitrola resigned from his seat and González Seligra assumed his place. She was sworn in on 21 June 2017.

As a national deputy, González Seligra voted in favor of the Voluntary Termination of Pregnancy Bill presented in 2018, which passed the Chamber but was struck down by the Senate. She also introduced a bill, cosigned by Nicolás del Caño, to end the Argentine state's funding of the Catholic Church.

She resigned from her bench on 4 April 2019, as part of the FIT's rotation agreement, and was replaced by Mónica Schlotthauer. Following her resignation from Congress, González Seligra went back to working as a teacher, and in 2019 she ran for intendente (mayor) in La Matanza, receiving 3.71% of the popular vote and landing fourth.
