= Graciela Calderón =

Argentine 21st century politician

Graciela Beatriz Calderón is an activist in Socialist Left (Argentina).

She was elected as a deputy in the legislature of Buenos Aires Province in 2021, as a candidate of the Workers' Left Front, alongside Guillermo Kane.

She comes from La Matanza Partido.
