= Christian Castillo (politician) =

Argentinian activist, politician, and sociologist

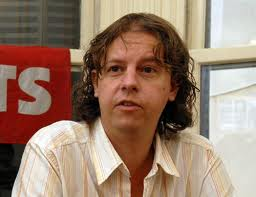

National Deputy
- Incumbent
- Assumed office 10 December 2023
- Constituency: Buenos Aires

Provincial Deputy of Buenos Aires
- In office 10 December 2013 – 10 June 2015
- Constituency: Third Electoral Section

Personal details
- Born: March 28, 1967 (age 59) Buenos Aires, Argentina
- Party: Socialist Workers' Party (since 1988)
- Other political affiliations: Movement for Socialism (1983-1988); Workers' Left Front (since 2011)
- Education: University of Buenos Aires
- Profession: Sociologist, politician

Christian Carlos Hernan Castillo (born March 28, 1967) is an Argentinian activist, politician, sociologist and university teacher. He is a founding member of the Socialist Workers' Party (Argentina) (PTS). In the 2013 elections he was voted in as a deputy for the Buenos Aires Province for the Workers Left Front; he resigned to his seat on June 10, 2015 to leave his place to the next candidate based on the banking rotation between the different parties that make up the Front. He was pre-candidate to Governor of the Buenos Aires Province during the 2015 primary elections, losing to Néstor Pitrola.

After the general elections of 2023, he was elected as national deputy for the Province of Buenos Aires.

== University ==
He was director of the Sociology department at the University of Buenos Aires Faculty of Social Sciences. As a Marxist intellectual, he heads the Cátedra Libre Karl Marx, which is taught in the Buenos Aires, La Plata, Neuquén, Córdoba, Mendoza, Jujuy, La Matanza, Tucumán and Quilmes Universities.

As a university teacher, he has actively participated in struggles defending a free and public education, against plans of privatising schools, which has led him to participate both nationally and abroad.

In 2000, he was apprehended while he was in Mexico in the midst of the UNAM strike. He was jailed with other Mexican students for 18 days and freed on February of that year thanks to solidarity protests with the Mexican students and the hunger strike of Argentinian activists and university students in front of the Mexican embassy.

He holds the subject General Sociology in the Faculty of Humanities and Education Sciences of the National University of La Plata, and the optional subject Sociology of revolutionary processes, in the Faculty of Social Sciences of the University of Buenos Aires.

== Politics ==
Between 1983 and 1988, he was leader of the Socialist Youth, youth wing of the Movement for Socialism.

In 1988, he was a founding member of the PTS along with José Montes, Raúl Godoy, and other intellectuals, workers and students.

He has been candidate for various positions, such as, National Deputy, Legislator of the City of Buenos Aires, and Chief of Government (mayor) of Buenos Aires (2003 and 2007). In the 2007 elections he ran as candidate for national deputy by a left coalition between the PTS and other organizations called "Socialist Workers' Left Front".

In 2009, he ran as candidate for deputy for the City of Buenos Aires for the Socialist Workers' Left Front conformed by the PTS, the MAS and IS.

He was the candidate of the for vice-president in the 2011 Argentine general election, along with Jorge Altamira for president.

In 2013, he was provincial deputy in the Buenos Aires Province Chamber of Deputies for the Workers Left Front.

== Publications ==
He is general coordinator of the Leon Trotsky Center of Study, Research and Publications (CEIP) and regularly collaborates in the "Estrategia Internacional" magazine, which is translated to English and French.

His works can be found in the magazines "Estrategia Internacional", "Lucha de Clases" and other books. He has published:

- Estado, poder, comunismo (1ª ed.). Imago Mundi. 2003. ISBN 978-950-793-019-5.
- Imperialismo, guerra y resistencia al comienzo del nuevo siglo (1ª ed.). Universidad de Buenos Aires. 2003. ISBN 978-950-29-0743-7. Co-authored with Eduardo Grüner y Horacio González
- Los '90 (1ª ed.). Final Abierto. 2007. ISBN 978-987-23580-1-3. Co-authored with Pablo Pozzi, Pablo Augusto Bonavena and Vicente Zito Lema.
- La izquierda frente a la argentina kirchnerista (1ª ed.). Planeta. 2011. ISBN 978-950-49-2742-6..
- Teoría social y trabajo social (1ª ed.). Universidad Nacional de La Plata. 2017. ISBN 978-950-34-1577-1. Collective work

== Other activities ==
He also participates in the radio program "Pateando el tablero" ("kicking the board"), transmitted by Radio Splendid.
