= 2027 Argentine general election =

- Presidential election
- 24 October 2027
Incumbent President
Javier Milei
LLA
- Chamber of Deputies
- 24 October 2027
- 130 of the 257 seats in the Chamber of Deputies
Party	Leader	Last election
LLA	Javier Milei	64
Fuerza Patria	Axel Kicillof	47
PU	Juan Schiaretti	8
FIT – Unidad	Myriam Bregman	3
Innovación Federal	Pamela Calletti	2
Defendamos Córdoba	Natalia de la Sota	1
For San Juan	Fabián Martín	1
La Neuquinidad	Alliance	0
- Senate
- 24 October 2027
- 24 of the 72 seats in the Senate

General elections are scheduled to take place in Argentina on 24 October 2027. Voters will elect the president and vice president of Argentina, members in the Chamber of Deputies and Senate, and the governors of most provinces. Incumbent president Javier Milei is running for re-election for a second term.

== Electoral system ==
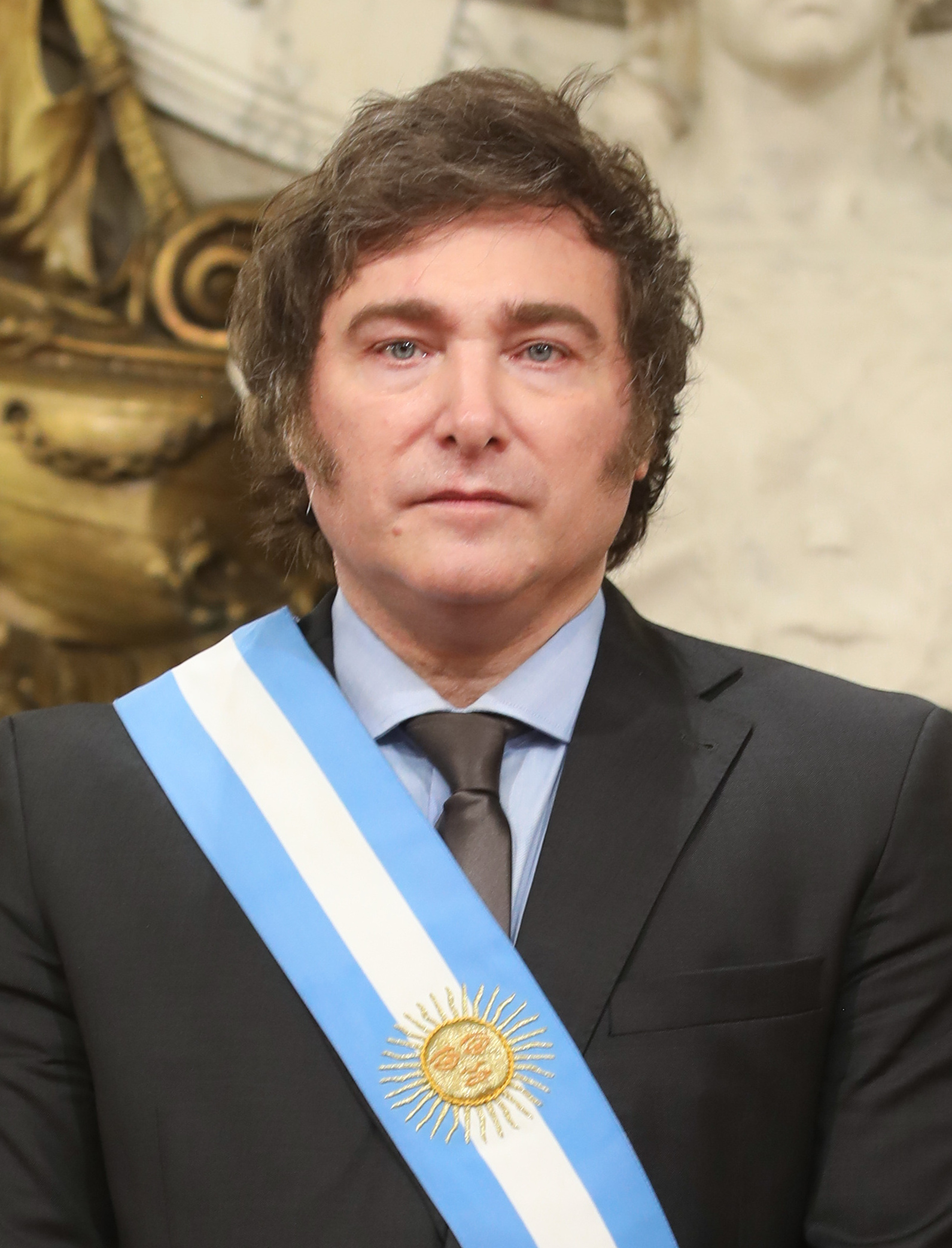
Javier Milei, the incumbent president, whose term expires on 10 December 2027.

=== President ===
The election of the president is conducted under the two-round system. A candidate can win the presidency in a single round by either winning over 45% of the vote or if they win 40% of the vote while finishing more than 10 percentage points ahead of the second-place candidate. If no candidate meets either threshold, a runoff takes place between the top two candidates. Voting is compulsory for citizens between 18 and 70 years old. Suffrage is also extended to 16- and 17-year-olds, though without compulsory voting.

While mandatory simultaneous primary elections (also known as PASO) were established in 2009, it is likely that they will not be carried out for the 2027 general election, as they were suspended for the 2025 legislative election, and multiple political sectors, including Milei, have expressed intent to eliminate them outright.

Per Argentina's electoral law, the first round is expected to take place on October 24, and a potential second round within 30 days, likely on November 21. According to the Constitution of Argentina, the president and vice president can be elected for two consecutive terms. Having been elected in 2023, incumbent president Javier Milei can thus run for re-election in 2027, and he has expressed interest in doing so.

=== Congress ===
==== Chamber of Deputies ====
The 257 members of the Chamber of Deputies are elected by proportional representation in 24 multi-member constituencies based on the provinces of Argentina, as well as the City of Buenos Aires. Seats are allocated using the d'Hondt method with a 3% electoral threshold. In this election, 130 of the 257 seats will be up for renewal for a four-year term.

Province	Total seats	Seats at stake
Buenos Aires	70	35
Buenos Aires City	25	12
Catamarca	5	2
Chaco	7	3
Chubut	5	3
Córdoba	18	9
Corrientes	7	4
Entre Ríos	9	4
Formosa	5	3
Jujuy	6	3
La Pampa	5	2
La Rioja	5	3
Mendoza	10	5
Misiones	7	4
Neuquén	5	2
Río Negro	5	3
Salta	7	4
San Juan	6	3
San Luis	5	2
Santa Cruz	5	2
Santa Fe	19	10
Santiago del Estero	7	4
Tierra del Fuego	5	3
Tucumán	9	5
Total	257	130

==== Senate ====
The 72 members of the Senate are elected in the same 24 constituencies, with three seats in each. The party receiving the most votes in each constituency wins two seats, with the third seat awarded to the second-placed party. The 2027 elections will see one-third of senators renewed, with eight provinces electing three senators for a 6-year term; Catamarca, Chubut, Córdoba, Corrientes, La Pampa, Mendoza, Santa Fe and Tucumán.

Outgoing senators
Province	Senator	Party
Catamarca	Lucía Benigna Corpacci	Justicialista
Catamarca	Flavio Sergio Fama	Unión Cívica Radical
Catamarca	Guillermo Eduardo Andrada	Convicción Federal
Chubut	Carlos Alberto Linares	Justicialista
Chubut	Edith Elizabeth Terenzi	Despierta Chubut
Chubut	Andrea Marcela Cristina	Frente PRO
Córdoba	Carmen Álvarez Rivero	La Libertad Avanza
Córdoba	Luis Alfredo Juez	La Libertad Avanza
Córdoba	Alejandra María Vigo	Provincias Unidas
Corrientes	Carlos Mauricio Espínola	Provincias Unidas
Corrientes	Mercedes Valenzuela	Unión Cívica Radical
Corrientes	Eduardo Vischi	Unión Cívica Radical
La Pampa	Daniel Pablo Bensusán	Justicialista
La Pampa	Daniel Kroneberger	Unión Cívica Radical
La Pampa	María Victoria Huala	Frente PRO
Mendoza	Anabel Fernández Sagasti	Justicialista
Mendoza	Mariana Juri	Unión Cívica Radical
Mendoza	Rodolfo Alejandro Suárez	Unión Cívica Radical
Santa Fe	Marcelo Lewandowski	Justicialista
Santa Fe	Carolina Losada	Unión Cívica Radical
Santa Fe	Eduardo Galaretto	Unión Cívica Radical
Tucumán	Beatriz Luisa Ávila	Independencia
Tucumán	Juan Manzur	Justicialista
Tucumán	Sandra Mariela Mendoza	Convicción Federal

== Candidates ==
=== Declared ===
- Javier Milei (LLA), President of Argentina (2023–present) and former National Deputy (2021–2023).
- Juan Grabois (PG-FP), National Deputy (2025–present).
- Esteban Bullrich (PRO), former National Deputy (2005–2010), former Minister of Education (2015–2017) and former Senator (2017–2021).
- Sergio Uñac (PJ-FP), former governor of San Juan (2015–2023) and former mayor of Pocito (2003–2011)
- Hernán Lacunza (Independent), former Minister of the Treasury (2019).
- Axel Kicillof (PJ-FP) Governor of Buenos Aires (2019–present)
- Federico González (Independent), political analyst and pollster.
- Santiago Passaglia (Hechos), mayor of San Nicolas (2023–present)
- Manuel Passaglia (Hechos), former mayor of San Nicolas (2017–2023) and Provincial Deputy (2025–present)
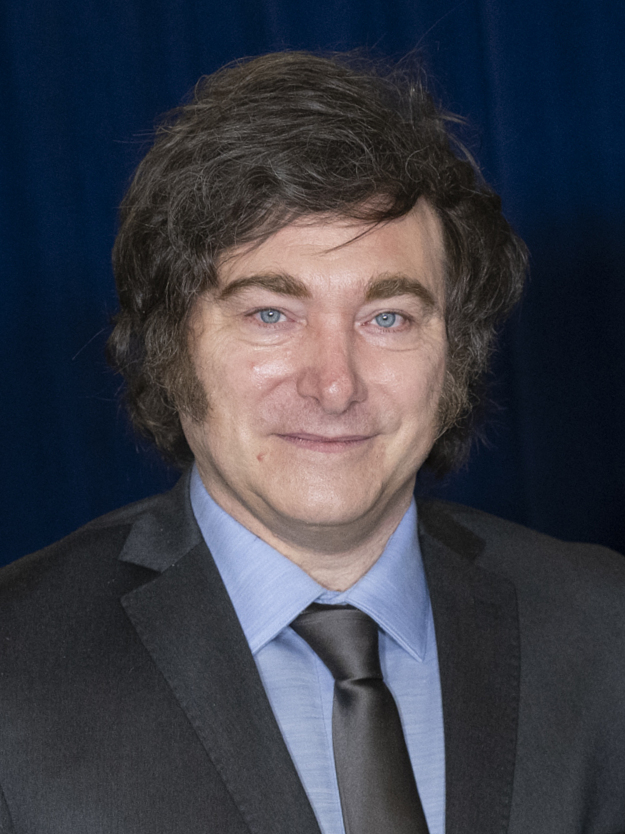
President
Javier Milei
(2023–present)
from Buenos Aires

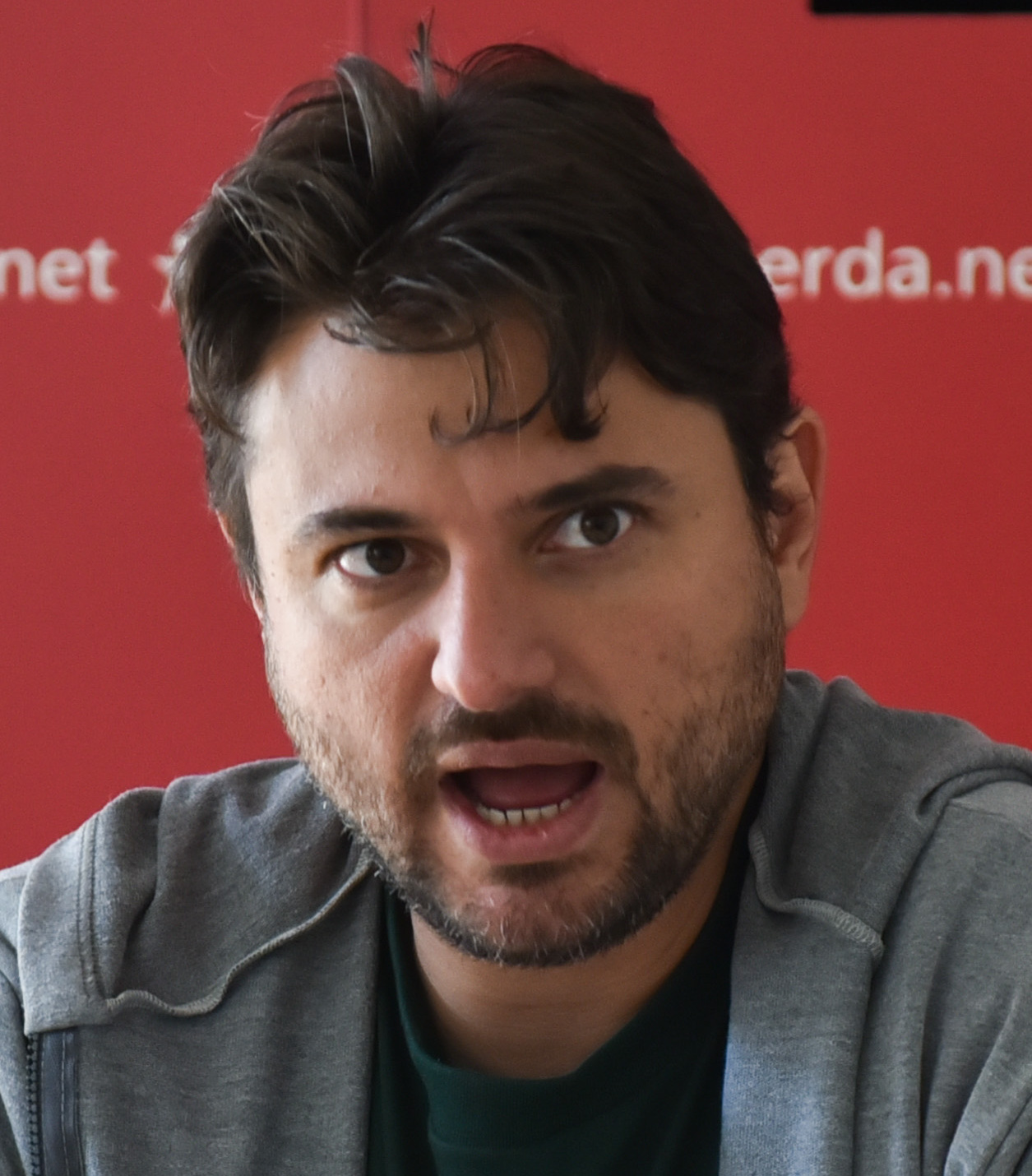
Juan Grabois
National Deputy (2025–present)
from Buenos Aires

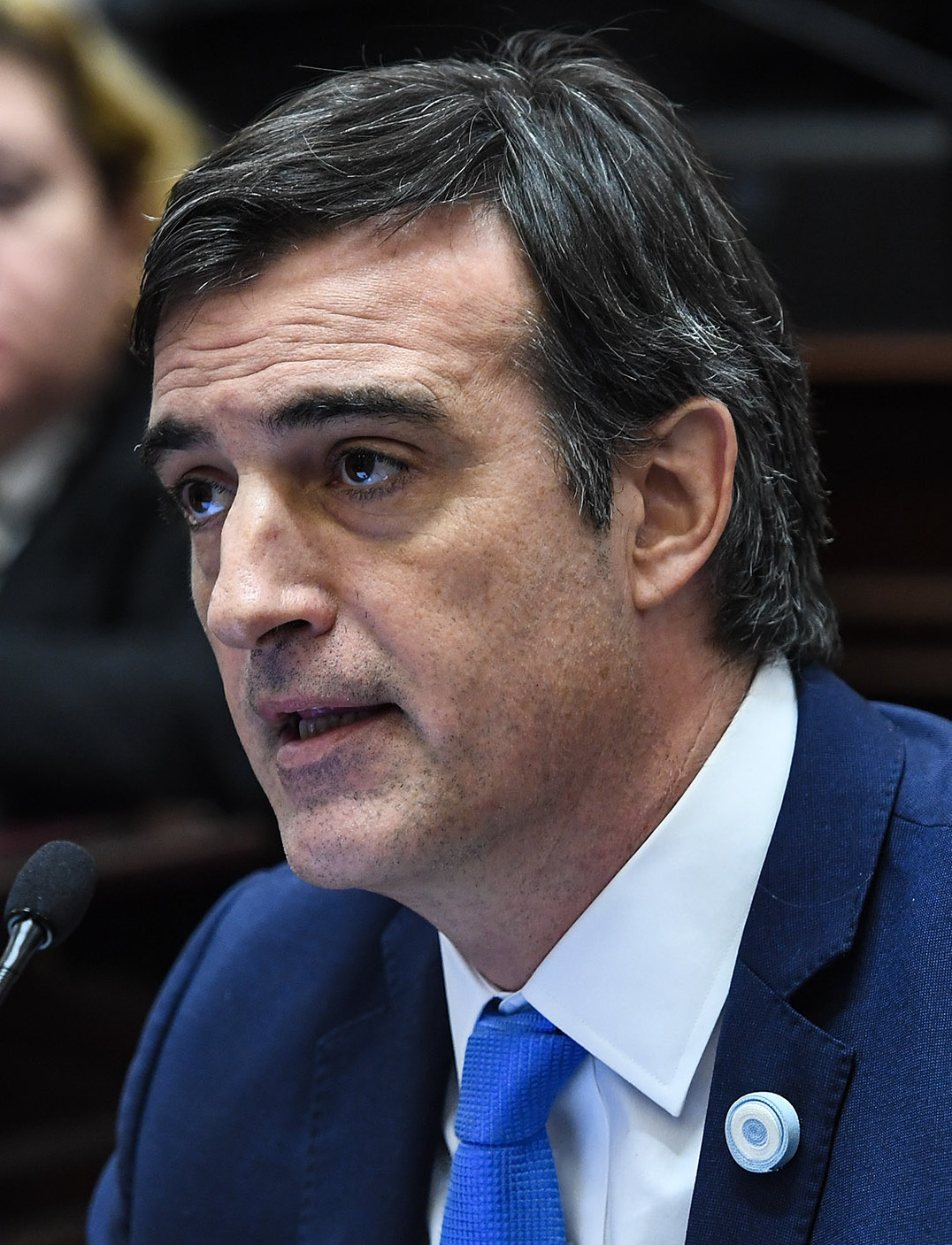
Former Senator
Esteban Bullrich
(2017–2021)
from Buenos Aires

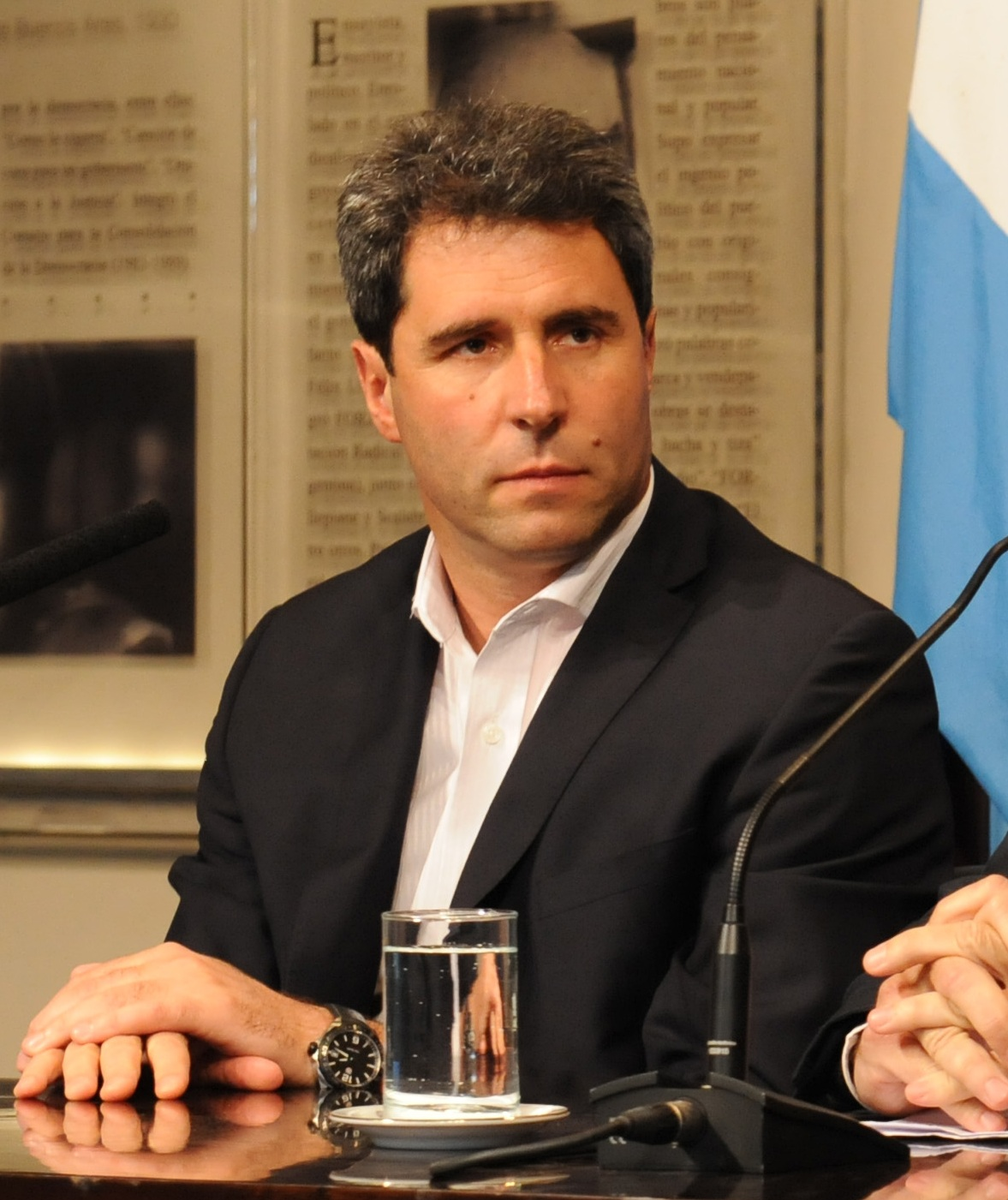
Former Governor
Sergio Uñac
(2015–2023)
of San Juan

Former Treasury Minister
Hernán Lacunza
(2019)
from Buenos Aires

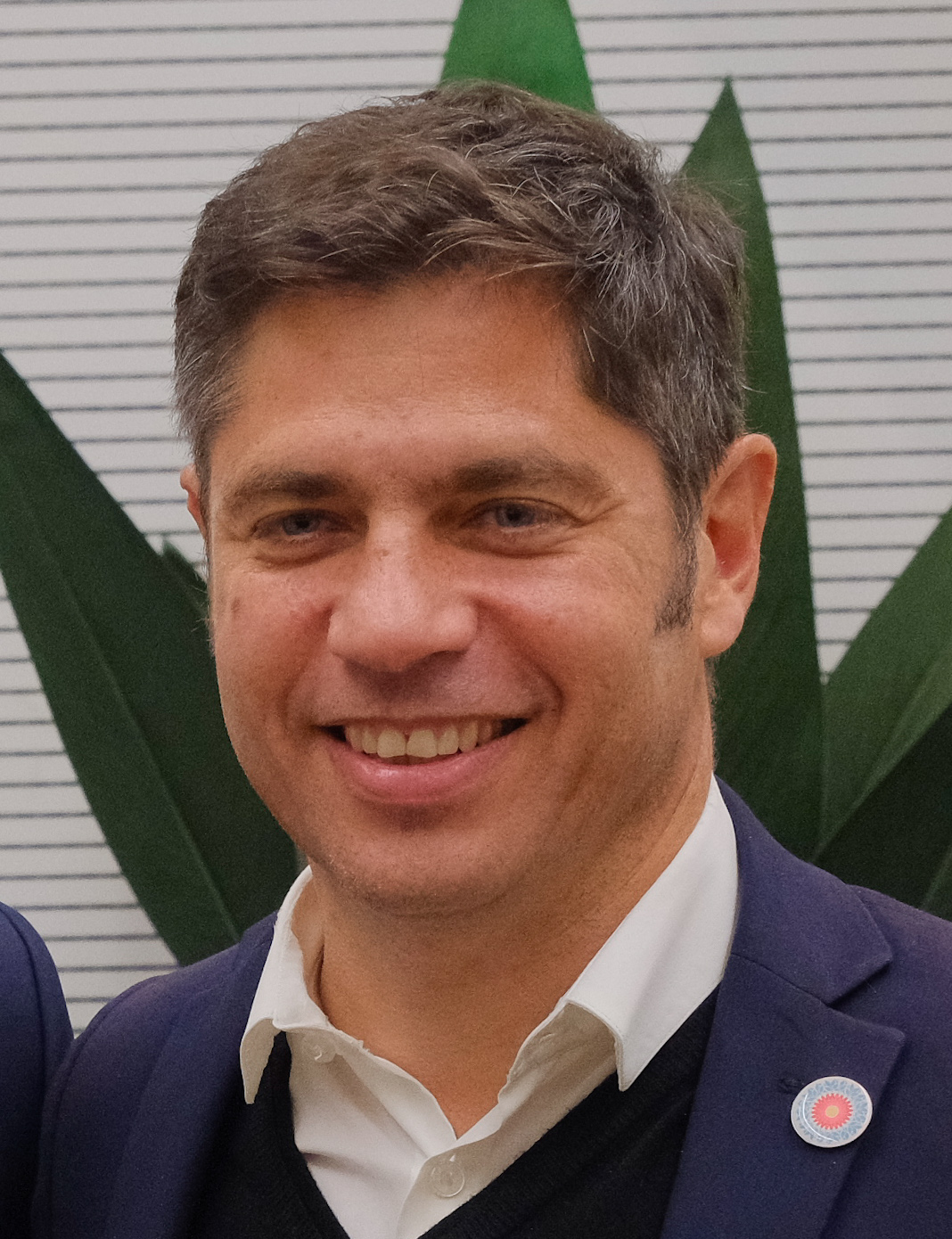
Governor
Axel Kicillof
(2019–present)
of Buenos Aires

=== Potential ===
- Myriam Bregman (FIT-U), National Deputy (2015–2016, 2021–2024, 2025–present)
- Máximo Kirchner (La Campora-FP), National Deputy (2015–present) and son of former presidents Néstor Kirchner and Cristina Fernández de Kirchner.
- Gerardo Zamora (Independent-FP), Senator (2013–2017, 2025–present)
- Sergio Massa (FR-FP), former Minister of Economy (2022–2023) and runner-up in the 2023 election.
- Juan Schiaretti (PU), former Governor of Córdoba (2007–2011, 2015–2023)
- Mauricio Macri (PRO), former President of Argentina (2015–2019) and former Chief of Government of Buenos Aires (2007–2015)
- Victoria Villarruel (PD), Vice President of Argentina (2023–present)
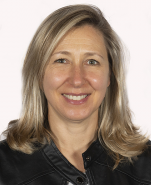
National Deputy
Myriam Bregman
(2015–2016; 2021–present)
from Buenos Aires

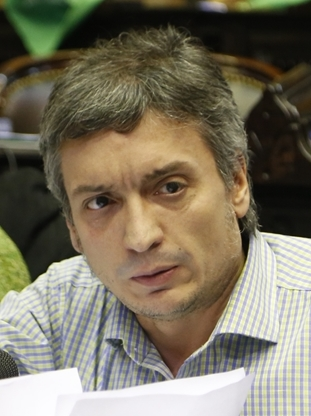
National Deputy
Máximo Kirchner
(2015–present)
from Buenos Aires

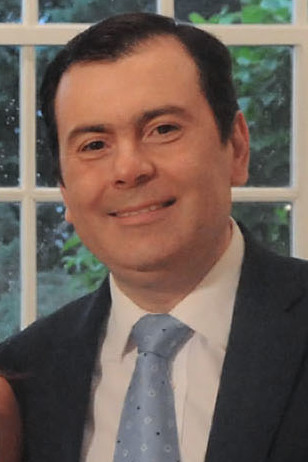
Senator
Gerardo Zamora
(2013–2017; 2025–present)
from Santiago del Estero

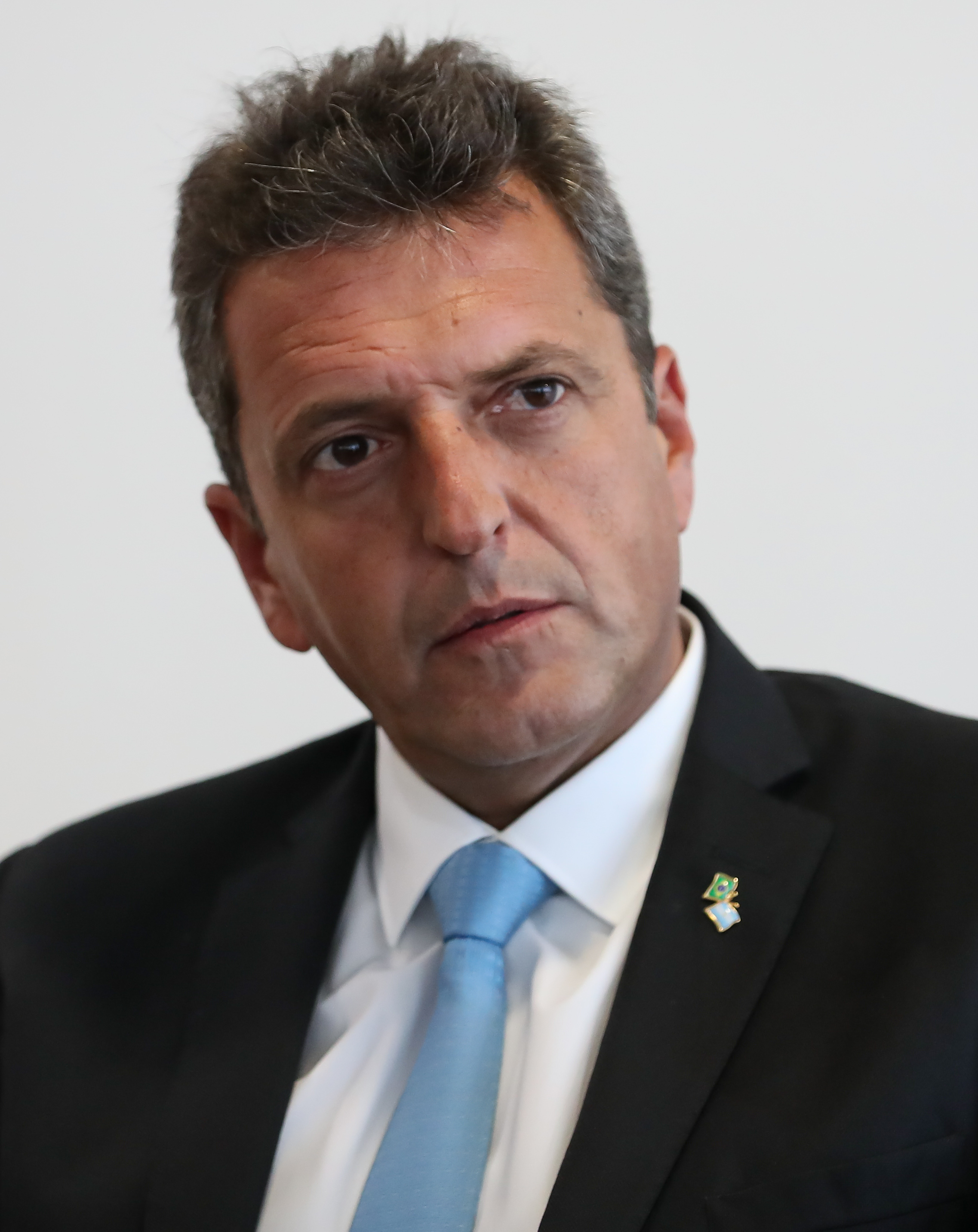
Former Minister of Economy
Sergio Massa
(2022–2023)
from Buenos Aires

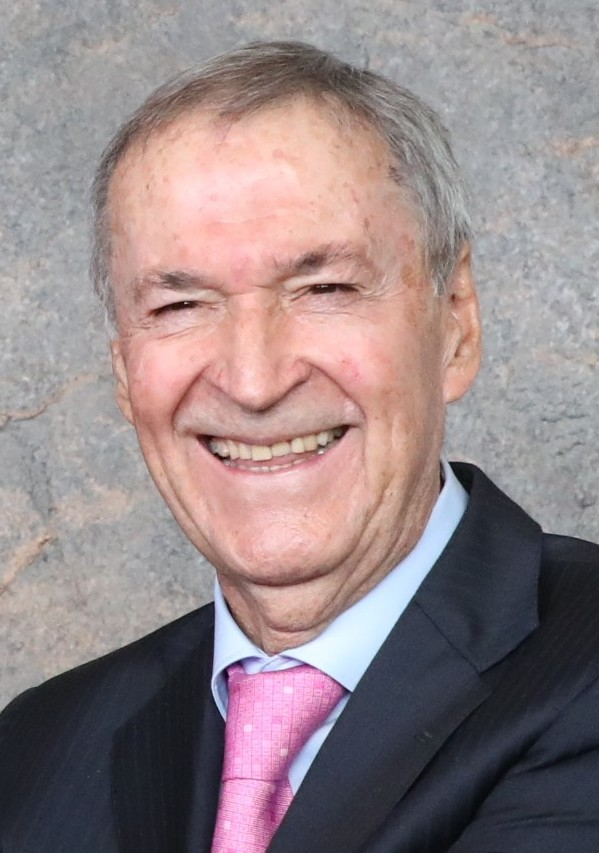
Former Governor
Juan Schiaretti
(2007–2011; 2015–2023)
of Córdoba

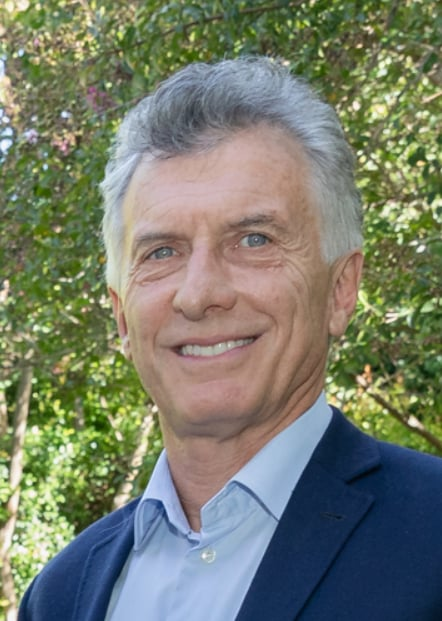
Former President
Mauricio Macri
(2015–2019)
from Buenos Aires

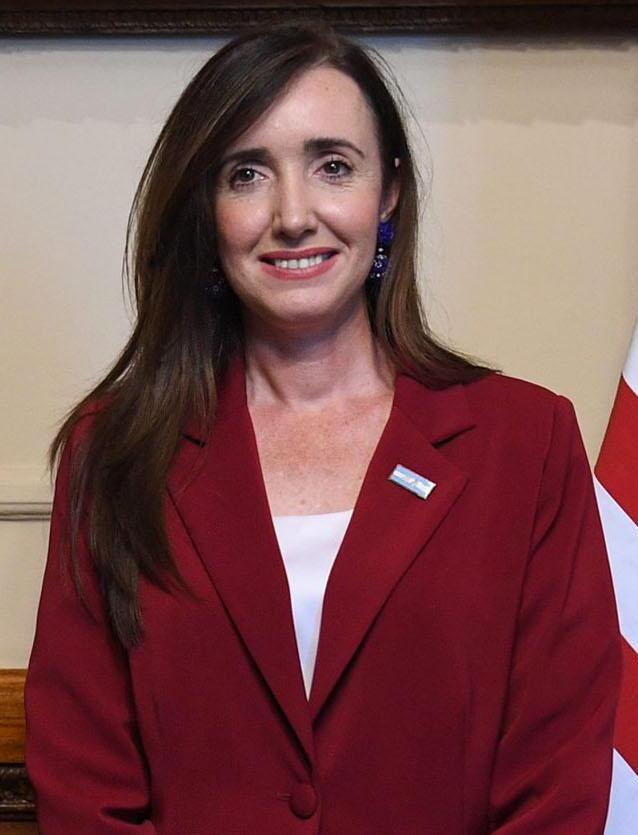
Vice President
Victoria Villarruel
(2023–present)
from Buenos Aires

=== Disqualified ===
- Cristina Fernández de Kirchner, former President of Argentina (2007–2015) and former Vice President of Argentina (2019–2023). Sentenced to a lifetime ban from running for office and six years of prison ratified by the Supreme Court.
- Guillermo Moreno, former secretary of trade (2006–2013). Sentenced to a lifetime ban from holding public office. He announced his candidacy anyway, on the grounds that the president of the country and other posts selected by popular vote would not be public offices.
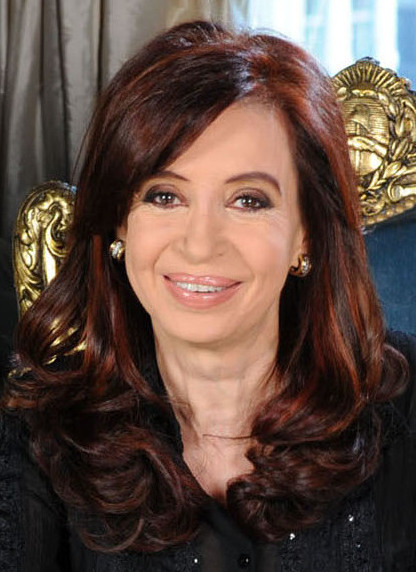
Former President
Cristina Fernández de Kirchner
(2007–2015)
from Buenos Aires

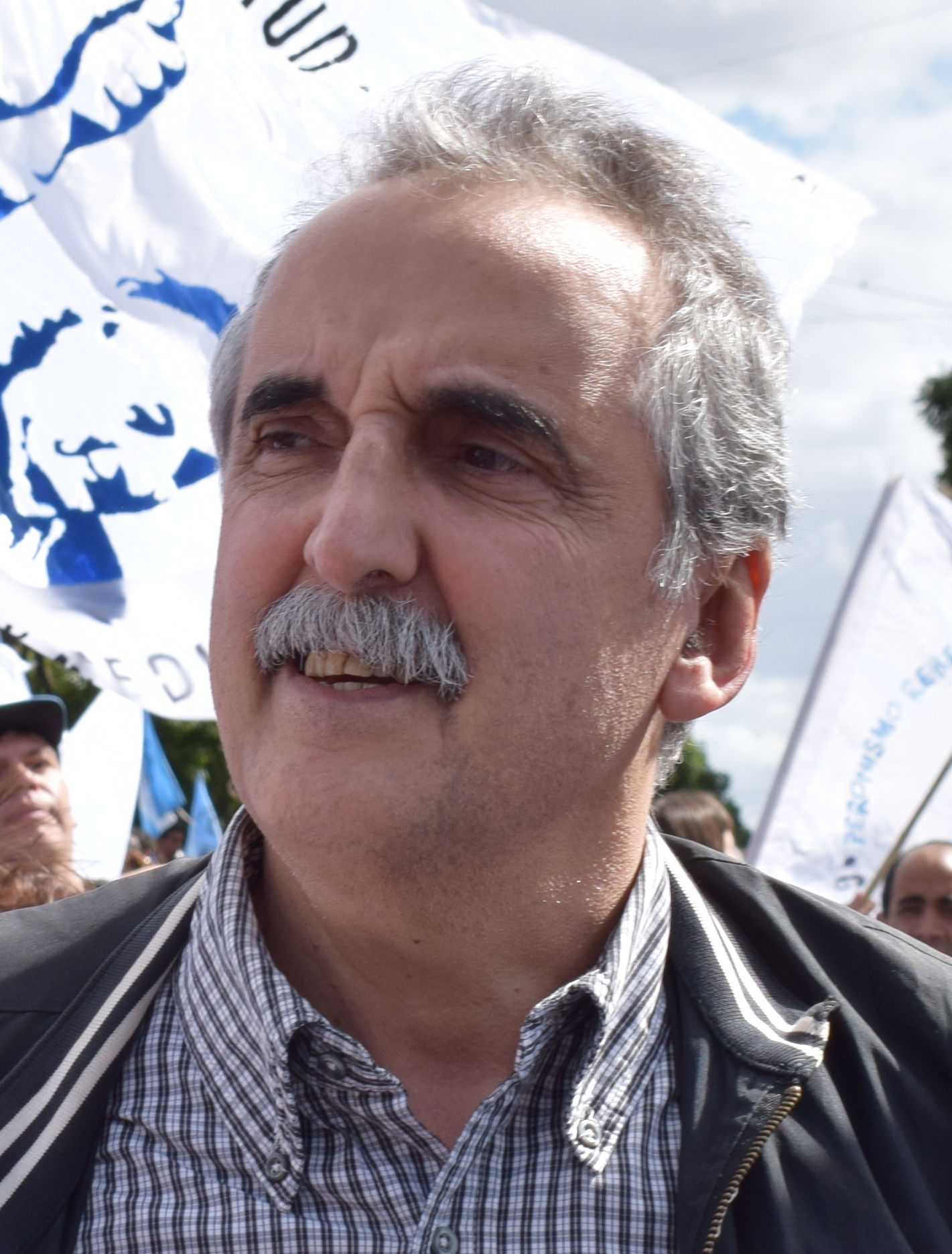
Former Domestic Trade Secretary
Guillermo Moreno
(2006–2013)
from Buenos Aires

== Opinion polls ==
=== Pre-campaign period ===
==== By candidate ====
===== 2026 =====
Fieldwork date	Polling firm	Sample											Others	Blank Abst.	Lead
Fieldwork date	Polling firm	Sample	Milei LLA	Kicillof PJ–FP	Kirchner (Note: Ineligible.) PJ–FP	Massa FR–FP	Moreno PyV–FP	Grabois PG–FP	Macri PRO	Schiaretti PU	Bregman FIT-U	Villarruel PD	Others	Blank Abst.	Lead
28 Oct–6 Nov 2026	Equipo Mide	1,911	28	23	–	5	–	2	3	–	7	5	17	3	5
31 Oct–4 Nov 2026	PoliTech	1,552	32	30.7	–	7.4	–	–	–	–	9.6	–	15.3	4	1.3
27 Oct–1 Nov 2026	DC Consultores	1,862	30.5	13.8	10.9	7.3	–	–	–	1.9	–	–	35.6	–	16.7
22–28 Oct 2026	RDT Consultores	1,107	28.9	19.8	–	11.4	–	–	–	–	7.5	6.4	–	13.9	9
14–27 Oct 2026	Meraki Consultora Política	1,069	45.7	22.3	–	4.6	–	–	–	–	9.9	–	–	–	23.4
21–25 Oct 2026	CB Global Data	1,151	27.1	16.5	12.1	–	–	–	–	–	7.3	–	19.1	3.5	10.6
2–9 Sep 2026	Explanans Consultora	7,025	38.5	24.0	–	6.1	–	–	3.8	–	10.4	–	8.3	3.0	14.5
24–29 Aug 2026	Consultora Tendencias	4,958	32.4	33.7	–	–	–	–	–	6.6	10.2	–	9.7	7.4	1.3
21–24 Aug 2026	RDT Consultores	1,286 (online)	29.2	18.3	–	8.7	–	1.7	–	–	4.7	6.7	3.1 (Note: Daniel Hadad (Ind.): 1.5 Sergio Uñac (FP): 0.9 Jorge Pablo Brito (Ind.): 0.7)	13.3	10.9
1–12 Aug 2026	Proyección Consultores	1,548	36.3	32.3	–	–	–	–	–	–	7.7	–	10.7	9.4	4.0
30–31 Jul 2026	CB Global Data	1,252	32.4	14.7	15.2	–	–	–	–	–	7.6	6.4	6.3	5.9	17.7
25–26 Jul 2026	Rubikon Intel	1,156	30.7	22.8	–	–	–	–	8.3	3.5	9.5	–	–	17.6	7.9
24–28 Jul 2026	RDT Consultores	1,139	30.5	14.8	–	6.4	–	1.4	–	–	6.4	5.3	10.4	14.2	15.7
21–26 Jul 2026	Delfos	5,400	30.3	32.9	–	–	–	–	6.0	2.4	9.0	5.3	3.9	3.6	2.6
8-31 Jul 2026	QSocial	1.550	31	29	–	–	–	–	–	8	11	–	–	6	2
8-31 Jul 2026	QSocial	1.550	31	–	–	22	–	–	–	8	15	–	–	9	9
1–10 Jul 2026	Proyección	1,817	33.7	32.1	–	–	–	–	–	–	6.9	–	10 (Note: Maximiliano Pullaro (UCR): 3.7)	13.5	1.6
28 May–3 Jun 2026	Explanans	7,015	38.2	28	–	–	–	–	5.2	–	12.8	–	5	2.8	10.2
25–31 May 2026	RDT Consultores	1,645	28.8	16.6	–	5.6	–	1.3	–	–	6.6	4.8	0.5	12.8	12.2
22–27 May 2026	Consultora Tendencias	4,740	32.8	26.3	–	–	–	5.1	11.5	4	12.6	–	–	4.4	6.5
22–27 May 2026	Consultora Tendencias	4,740	36.5	29.9	–	–	–	–	–	5.8	14.6	–	–	7.7	6.6
22–25 May 2026	Isasi Burdman	3,450	39.1	23.0	–	–	–	–	11.0	–	9.0	–	–	–	16.1
6–15 May 2026	Equipo Mide	1,915	29	22	–	3	–	3	8	–	12	4	10 (Note: Máximo Kirchner (FP): 2 Martín Lousteau (UCR): 1 Jorge Brito (PRO): 1 Carlos Melconian (PRO): 1 Horacio Rodríguez Larreta (PRO): 1)	4	7
10–14 Apr 2026	Consultora Delfos	3,120	29.6	40.4	–	–	–	–	–	3.5	6.5	–	8.1	7.0	10.8
22–28 Mar 2026	CB Global Data	2.015	28.3	24.2	–	–	–	6.7	–	–	–	2.0	18.9 (Note: Patricia Bullrich (LLA): 7.4 María Eugenia Vidal (PRO): 5.4 Leandro Santoro (UCR): 4.7 Miguel Ángel Pichetto (ERF):1.4)	5.3	4.1
9–15 Mar 2026	Consultora Tendencias	3,417	38.1	33.0	–	–	–	–	–	4.8	11.4	–	–	–	5.1
10–15 Feb 2026	CB Global Data	2,588	35.7	22.5	–	–	4.5	–	5.2	3.7	4.2	–	4.7	9.2	13.2

===== 2025 =====
Fieldwork date	Polling firm	Sample									Others	Blank Abst.	Undecided	Lead	Link
Fieldwork date	Polling firm	Sample	Milei LLA	Kicillof FP	Macri PRO	Schiaretti PU	Moreno FP	Manes UCR	del Caño FIT-U	Bregman FIT-U	Others	Blank Abst.	Undecided	Lead	Link
9–13 Dec 2025	CB Consultora	1,503	34.9	23.5	6.7	4.8	5.1	–	–	2.9	9.1	11.2	11.2	11.4	
19–27 Nov 2025	Isasi-Burdman	1,136	54	18	–	3	–	–	3	–	5	17	17	36	
30 Jun–2 Jul 2025	Opina Argentina	2,281	42	32	–	4	–	3	–	3	6	6	4	10	

==== By political coalition ====
Fieldwork date	Polling firm	Sample	La Libertad Avanza	Homeland Force	Republican Proposal	Workers' Left Front	United Provinces (political coalition)	Radical Civic Union	Others	Blank Abst.	Lead
28 Oct–6 Nov 2026	Equipo Mide	1,911	31	34	7	6	1	2	4	4	3
27 Oct–1 Nov 2026	DC Consultores	1,862	42.6	25.6	–	4	–	–	19.1	–	17
17–25 Oct 2026	Hugo Haime & Asociados	1,200	33.2	35.1	–	7.1	–	–	5	7.7	1.9
16–19 Oct 2026	Zuban Córdoba	1,600	31.5	36.6	6.6	5.5	–	–	7.8	–	5.1
12–17 Oct 2026	Synopsis	1,259	33.6	35	5.8	10	2.7	–	8.2	–	1.4
5–13 Oct 2026	ESPOP	1,000	26	24	3	4	3	2	4	9	2
1–13 Oct 2026	Proyección Consultores	1,231	38	36	4	3	4	–	–	15	2
18–25 Sep 2026	Equipo Mide	2,114	33	33	4	6	1	1	3	6	0
15–23 Sep 2026	OPSA	3,031	37	34	5	8	–	–	8	–	3
8–17 Sep 2026	TrendsData	2,000	35	33	7	8	2	–	4	4	2
11–13 Sep 2026	Arena Pública Consultora	802	37	37	–	7	8	–	5	3	0
1–10 Sep 2026	Proyección Consultores	1,354	35.0	31.9	5.6	5.5	3.5	–	–	18.5	4
4–9 Sep 2026	Opinaia	1,000	33	29	7	6	5	–	–	19	4
3–9 Sep 2026	ESPOP	1,004	24	23	3	5	3	2	4	10	1
5–8 Sep 2026	Analogías	2,932	30.7	31	–	6.2	7.4	–	–	24.7	0.7
28–31 Aug 2026	DC Consultores	2,345	43.7	26.1	–	2.3	–	–	17.8	–	17.6
12–21 Aug 2026	Isasi-Burdman	2,055	34	19	10	8	6	–	3	16	15
10–18 Aug 2026	Synopsis	1,224	35.5	35.7	6.1	7.1	2.4	–	5.3	7.9	0.2
1–12 Aug 2026	Proyección Consultores	1,548	32.5	36.6	6.6	2.7	4.2	–	–	17.4	4.0
5–11 Aug 2026	ESPOP	1,000	24	26	5	5	2	1	4	6	2
30–31 Jul 2026	CB Global Data	1,252	21.6	19.4	9.2	7.0	–	–	9.7	22.7	2.0
28–31 Jul 2026	OPSA	2,895	34	21	7	9	–	–	15	8	14
25–28 Jul 2026	AtlasIntel	4,080	38.7	27.5	6.5	2.6	–	3.9	4	16.7	9.6
25–26 Jul 2026	Rubikon Intel	1,156	29.3	26.2	7.9	6.8	–	2.4	–	5	3.2
24–26 Jul 2026	DC Consultores	1,940	41.3	24.1	–	4.9	2.4	–	14.6	12.6	17
22–26 Jul 2026	Zuban Cordoba	1,500	28	31.3	6.8	4.4	2.4	2.3	7.5	17.3	3
3–8 Jul 2026	UdeSA	1,000	24	25	4	4	3	–	–	27	1
2–10 May 2026	Proyección Consultores	1,846	32.3	36.0	6.7	5.6	2.9	–	–	16.0	4.0
2–5 May 2026	Opina Argentina	3,714	35	34	–	9	6	–	–	–	1
5–16 Jan 2026	Consultora Trends	2,000	43	32	–	–	4	–	11	4	11
11 Jan 2026	Opina Argentina	3,590	44	35	–	4	4	–	7	5	9
