= Romina Del Plá =

Argentinian activist and politician

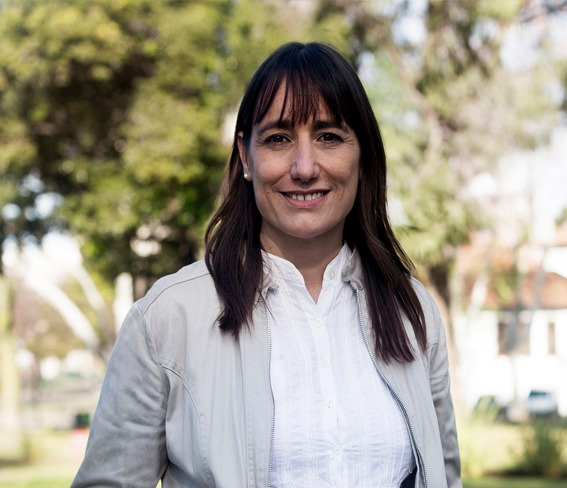

National Deputy
- Incumbent
- Assumed office 10 December 2021
- Constituency: Buenos Aires
- In office 10 December 2017 – 10 December 2020
- Constituency: Buenos Aires

Personal details
- Born: 2 April 1972 (age 54)
- Party: Workers' Party
- Other political affiliations: Workers' Left Front
- Relatives: Claudio del Plá (uncle)
- Education: University of Buenos Aires

Romina Del Plá (born 2 April 1972) is an activist in the Workers' Party (Argentina).

She was elected to the Argentine national Chamber of Deputies at the 2017 Argentine legislative election. She was elected for Buenos Aires Province as a candidate of the Workers' Left Front. She resigned her seat on 10 December 2020, in order to allow Juan Carlos Giordano of the Socialist Left to take her place as per the Left Front's seat rotation agreement.

She was previously a history lecturer at the University of Buenos Aires. Romina Del Plá has a 23-year teaching career in the La Matanza classrooms and works in the Aldo Bonzi 41st High School and in the 3-d Technical high school of San Justo.

== Early life and family ==
She comes from the Trotskyist family of leaders of the Partido Obrero (PO). Her father Miguel del Plá was leader of the PO of Santa Cruz. Nora Biaggio, her mother, is a retired teacher and leader of the Teaching Tribune group. Her uncle Claudio del Plá is a current legislator of the PO in Salta. Her parents were workers: Nora was a teacher and Miguel a metallurgist, and political activists. As a child Romina moved with her family to Córdoba, it was their party decision for her parents to defend a party's activity during the dictatorship.

== Political career ==
Del Plá gained prominence in 2017 for challenging the power of Roberto Baradel in the elections for the leadership in the Buenos Aires teachers' union. She has become one of the main leaders of the movement today, supporting the anti-bureaucratic opposition among teachers. From her own words "they want the workers' revolution and they also want to lead the working class in a socialist way out". She supports the right of teachers to have sick leave certificates and against the reduction of the educational budget. She is a General Secretary of the Educational Trade Union Suteba Matanza of Buenos Aires (SUTEBA) of the town La Matanza. Romina Del Pla as a national deputy for the province of Buenos Aires from the Left Front was supported by 1,300,000 votes throughout the country and assumed her bench in the Lower House of National Congress on December 10, 2017. Her goal as a deputy is to face the labor, retirement and educational reforms.

In 2019 she was the FIT-U's candidate for vice-president, alongside Nicolás del Caño for president.

In 2021 she was elected as a national deputy for Buenos Aires Province.

In 2025 she was again elected as a national deputy for BA Province.

== Electoral history ==
=== Executive ===
Electoral history of Romina del Plá
Election	Office	List	Votes			Result	Ref.
Election	Office	List	Total	%	P.	Result	Ref.
2019	Vice President of Argentina	Workers' Left Front	579,228	2.16%	4th	Not elected	

=== Legislative ===
Electoral history of Romina del Plá
Election	Office	List	#	District	Votes			Result	Ref.
Election	Office	List	#	District	Total	%	P.	Result	Ref.
2017	National Deputy	Workers' Left Front	2	Buenos Aires Province	497,665	5.34%	4th (Note: Presented on an electoral list. The data shown represents the share of the vote the entire party/alliance received in that constituency.)	Elected	
2021	National Deputy	Workers' Left Front	2	Buenos Aires Province	609,158	6.82%	4th	Elected	
