= Laura Cano =

Argentine politician

María Laura Cano Kelly (born 25 January 1990 in Rauch, Buenos Aires) is an Argentine political activist and a member of the Socialist Workers' Party (Argentina).

== Background ==
In April 2023 she assumed her seat as a member of the provincial legislature of Buenos Aires Province, as part of the rotation of seats by the Workers Left Front.

She is also a medical general practitioner.
