= Christian Castillo =

Christian Castillo may refer to:

- Christian Castillo (politician) (born 1967), activist in the Socialist Workers' Party (Argentina)
- Christian Castillo (footballer) (born 1984), Salvadoran footballer
