= Noelia Barbeito =

Argentine politician

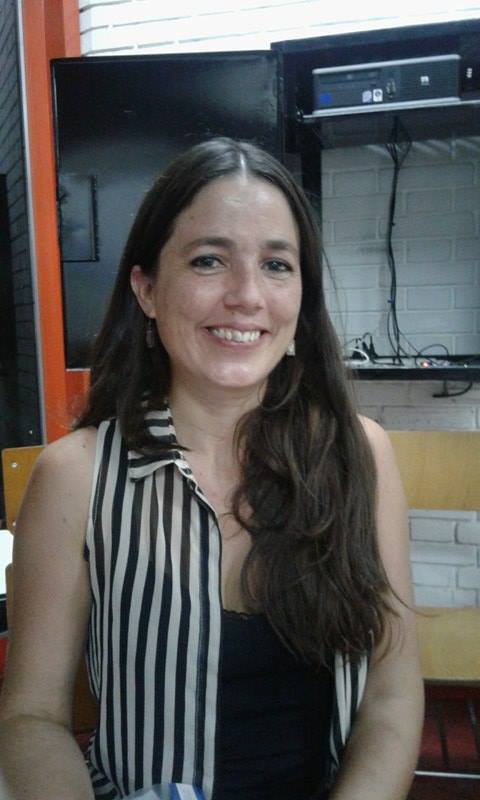
Noelia Barbeito (2017).

Noelia Barbeito (born October 25, 1981, in Mendoza, Argentina) is a provincial senator in Mendoza Province, Argentina.

She is a member of the Socialist Workers' Party, and was elected as a candidate of the Workers' Left Front in October 2013. She is the Front's candidate for governor of Mendoza Province in February 2015. She is a history teacher.
