= Soledad Sosa =

Argentine politician

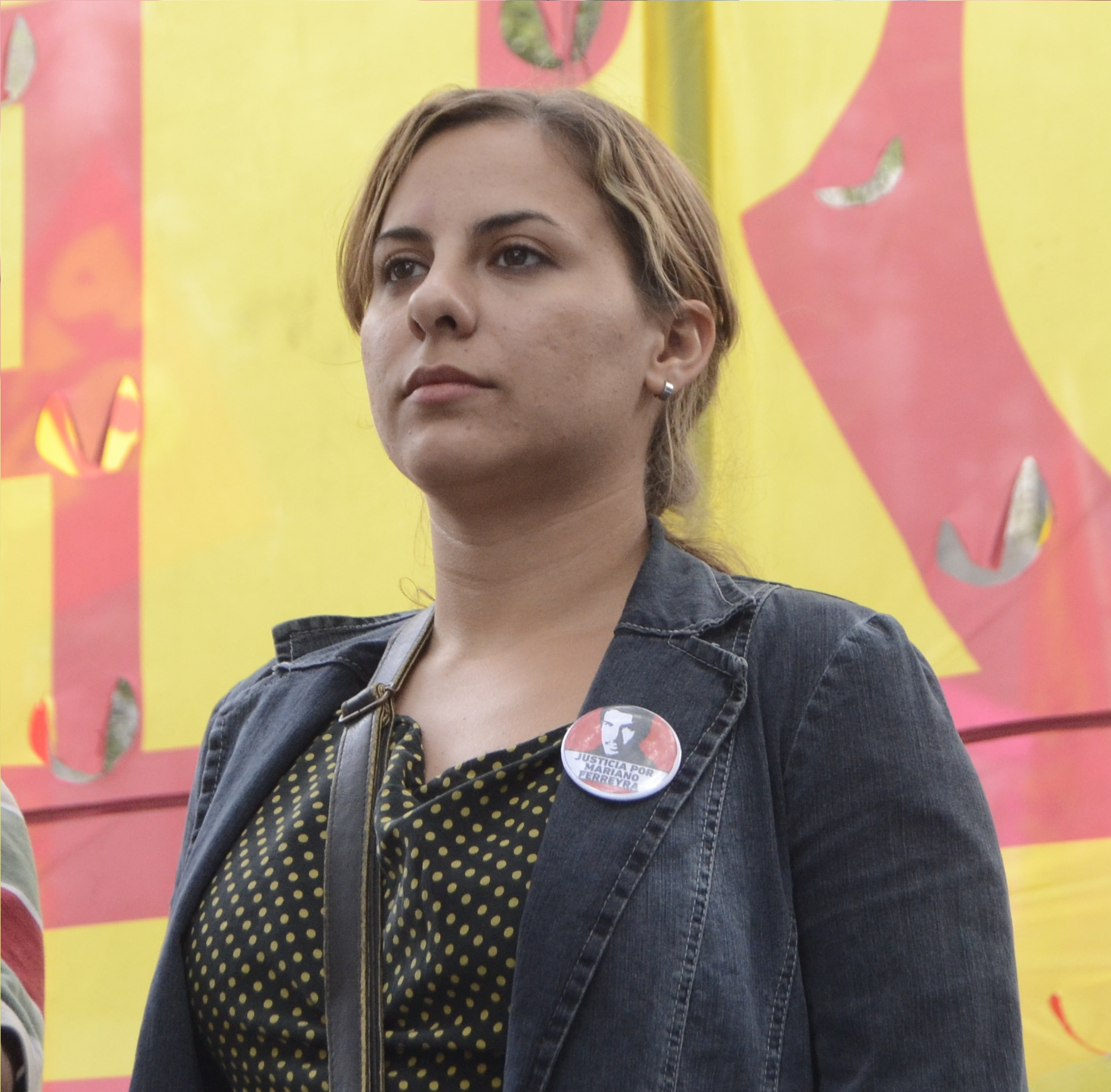
- Soledad Sosa (2016)

Soledad Sosa (born c. 1986) is an Argentine politician of the Workers' Party who served as a deputy elected in Mendoza Province from 2015 to 2017. She held the post by rotation for the Workers' Left Front, taking over from Nicolas del Caño in December 2015.
