= Angélica Lagunas =

Argentine politician

Angélica Lagunas (born 26 May 1972) was a provincial deputy in Neuquén Province in Argentina.

She is a member of Socialist Left (Argentina) and was elected as a candidate of the Workers' Left Front.

She held the post in rotation for a year, taking over from Raúl Godoy in December 2013, and handing over to Gabriela Suppicich in December 2014.

She previously worked as a school teacher.
