= Alejandro López (politician) =

Member of the provincial legislature in Neuquen

Alejandro Elias López is a member of the provincial legislature in Neuquén Province in Argentina, elected in June 2011.

He is the first person elected from the Workers' Left Front.

He was a ceramist worker, and general secretary of the ceramists' trade union.

He stood down in December 2012, to be replaced by Raúl Godoy.
