= Cintia Frencia =

Argentine politician

Cintia Frencia (born 18 May 1987) is a former member of the provincial legislature in Córdoba Province, Argentina.

She is a member of the Workers' Party (Argentina), and was elected as a candidate of the Workers' Left Front.

She held the post in rotation, taking over from Liliana Olivero in December 2013, and handing over to Laura Vilches in December 2014.

She previously studied at the National University of Córdoba.
