= Laura Vilches =

Argentinian teacher and politician

Provincial Legislator of Córdoba
- In office 4 December 2015 – 10 December 2019
- Preceded by: Cintia Frencia
- In office 10 December 2014 – 4 December 2015

Personal details
- Born: 24 March 1982 (age 44) Santa Fe, Argentina
- Party: Socialist Workers' Party
- Other political affiliations: Workers' Left Front (since 2011)
- Education: National University of Córdoba
- Profession: Politician teacher

Laura Vilches (born 24 March 1982) is an Argentinian teacher and politician. She is one of the national referents of the Socialist Workers' Party (PTS), a trotskyist party member of the Workers' Left Front (FIT) for which she was a provincial deputy in Córdoba Province from 2014 to 2015, and later from 2015 to 2019.

She previously worked as a teacher of literature.

== Biography ==
Laura Vilches was born on 24 March 1982 in the Santa Fe Province, but has lived in Córdoba since 1987. She grew up and lived as a child in the Bella Vista neighborhood. She studied highschool in the Manuel Belgrano school, where she was an activist and was several times elected as delegate of her class.

In 2005, as she was studying Modern Languages in the National University of Córdoba, she participated in the protests for the abolishment of the Higher Studies Law (Ley de Educación Superior), approved years before by Carlos Menem and which Néstor Kirchner harshened. During that time, she would come in contact with the En Clave Roja/Tesis XI (Red Key/11th Thesis) student group made up by independent activists and PTS militants. She soon became a militant in 2006; in a few years she would start her job as a teacher and would specialise in Gender studies, becoming one of the main referents of the socialist feminist group Pan y Rosas.

== Provincial deputy ==
2011 would see the formation of the Workers' Left Front (FIT), a coalition that would bring together the main left-wing trotskyist parties nationally. In Córdoba, the FIT won a seat in the provincial elections for a single district, which would rotate between the three parties of the FIT. On 10 December 2014, Vilches would enter as legislator replacing Cintia Frencia during the remaining term; her sworn in office was accompanied by other PTS referents such as Nicolás del Caño, Noelia Barbeito and Raúl Godoy. In the 2015 elections, the FIT won 6.27% of votes and three seats, which would allow Vilches to hold a full four-year term.

As legislator, she keeps her wage as a teacher and donates the rest of her salary to different worker conflicts, such as the laid-off workers of Minetti, the La Mañana newspaper or the Valeo autoparts factory, as well as the worker-controlled factories MadyGraf and Zanón. She has also donated money to support student and university teacher struggles demanding more budget for education. Against the salary increases of legislators, she has presented a project that forces all deputies having the same wage as a teacher.

She has requested information about femicides and presented a proposition to create an emergency provincial plan against violence towards women and establishing easy access to subsidies, housing and working and student licenses. She has protested in the Ni una menos movement in Córdoba and is an activist demanding the legalisation of free abortions and integral sexual education, which allowed her to present the project for Legal, Safe and Free Abortions in 2018 in the National Congress of Argentina. Likewise, she made a judicial case against the Catholic Church in Córdoba for tax evasion and demanding information in the provincial legislature on rents destined by the province governor to the Church.
