= Pablo Sebastián López =

Argentine politician

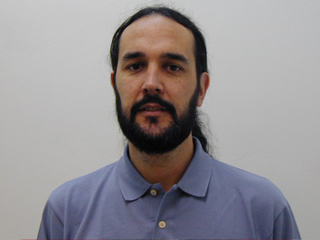
His photograph.

Pablo Sebastián López (born 8 November 1975, Salta) is a member of the Workers' Party (Argentina), and a member of the Argentine national chamber of deputies.

He was elected as a provincial deputy in Salta Province in 2001 and re-elected in 2005, and was replaced by Claudio del Plá in 2009.

He was elected as a national deputy for Salta in the 2013 Argentine legislative election, nominally as a candidate of the Workers' Party, but effectively part of the Workers' Left Front.

He will be the Workers' Party's candidate for mayor of Salta city at the next election.
