= Cecilia Soria =

Argentinian politician

Cecilia Soria (born c. 1991) is a member of the provincial chamber of deputies in Mendoza Province, Argentina. She was elected as a candidate of the Workers' Left Front. She was previously a sociology student.
