= Martín Dalmau =

Argentine politician (born c. 1974)

Martín Dalmau (born c. 1974) is a provincial deputy in Mendoza Province in Argentina, elected in October 2013.

He is a member of the Workers' Party (Argentina) and was elected as a candidate of the Workers' Left Front.

He worked as a history teacher at a high school in Las Heras, Mendoza.
