= Juan Carlos Giordano =

Argentine activist (born 1961)

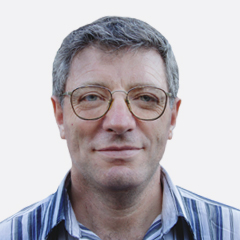
Juan Carlos Giordano.

Juan Carlos Giordano (born c. 1961) is an Argentine activist and politician of the Socialist Left. He is currently a member of the Argentine Chamber of Deputies, representing Buenos Aires Province as part of the Socialist Left - Socialist Workers' Party bloc. He was elected in 2013.

He was the vice-presidential running mate of the Workers' Party's Jorge Altamira in the 2015 presidential primary elections, but ultimately lost to the Del Caño - Bregman formula.

He works as a lawyer, is married, lives in Lanús Este, and is a Boca Juniors supporter.
