= Andrea Ruiz =

Argentine politician

Member of the Chamber of Deputies of Santiago del Estero
- In office 2013–2017

Personal details
- Party: Workers' Party
- Other political affiliations: Workers' Left Front

Andrea Ruiz is an Argentine politician who served as a provincial deputy in Santiago del Estero Province in Argentina, elected in October 2013.

She is a member of the Workers' Party, and was elected as a candidate of the Workers' Left Front. Ruiz shared responsibilities for overseeing banking in the provincial legislature with Anisa Favoretti.

Ruiz organized a local event of "Ni una menos" in Santiago del Estero to raise awareness about gender-based violence in 2016.
