= Liliana Olivero =

Argentine politician

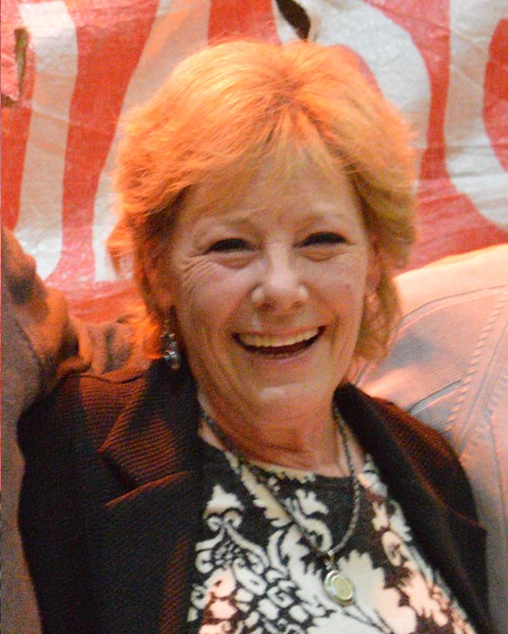
]Liliana Olivero

Maria Liliana Olivero (born 20 January 1956) is an Argentine politician and former member of the provincial legislature in Córdoba Province, Argentina. She is a member of the Socialist Left (Argentina).

== Career ==
She was elected in 2003, and re-elected in 2007 and 2011, the last time as a candidate of the Workers' Left Front.

She was the Front's no. 1 candidate for Córdoba Province in the 2013 Argentine legislative election. She only missed election narrowly, and there was a dispute over the result.

In December 2013 she stood down as a provincial deputy, under the agreement to rotate the Front's seats, and handed over to Cintia Frencia.

She is a child psychologist, and has two children.
