= Héctor Fresina =

Argentine politician

Héctor Fresina (born c. 1968) was a provincial deputy in Mendoza Province in Argentina.

He is a member of the Workers' Party and was elected in October 2013 as a candidate of the Workers' Left Front.
