= Macarena Escudero =

Argentinian politician

- Born: c. 1990
- Occupation: Activist

Macarena Escudero (born c. 1990) is an activist in the Socialist Workers' Party (Argentina), and a leader of its youth wing.

In 2014, she was elected as a Mendoza city councillor, and in June 2015, she was elected as a Mendoza provincial deputy.
