= Alejandro Vilca =

Argentine politician

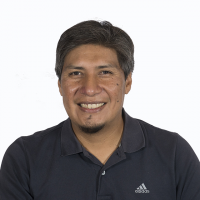

Provincial Legislator of Jujuy
- Incumbent
- Assumed office 10 December 2025
- In office 10 December 2017 – 9 December 2021

National Deputy
- In office 10 December 2021 – 10 December 2025
- Constituency: Jujuy

Personal details
- Born: 5 July 1976 (age 50) San Salvador de Jujuy, Argentina
- Party: Socialist Workers' Party
- Other political affiliations: Workers' Left Front – Unity (2011–present)

Alejandro Ariel Vilca (born 5 July 1976) is an Argentine activist, garbage worker, trade unionist and politician, active in the Socialist Workers' Party (PTS). A member of the Indigenous Qulla people, Vilca was elected to the provincial legislature of Jujuy Province in 2017 on the Workers' Left Front (FIT) list, which won 18% of the vote. In 2021, he was elected to the National Chamber of Deputies.

== Early life ==
Vilca was born on 5 July 1976 in San Salvador de Jujuy, the capital of Jujuy Province. His family belongs to the Qulla people, one of the many indigenous peoples who inhabit the Argentine Northwest. Alongside his four siblings, he was raised by a single mother who worked as a domestic maid and janitor at the city's private hospital. Vilca grew up in the San Isidro neighbourhood. Upon finishing high school, he moved to San Juan to study architecture at the National University of San Juan (UNSJ); he worked odd jobs as a mason, a waiter, and an ice cream vendor to sustain himself while he studied. In the UNSJ he joined En Clave Roja, the Socialist Workers' Party (PTS) student wing which was then in opposition to the education reform of president Carlos Menem.

== Activism and political career ==
From 1996, Vilca became an active member of the PTS, regularly attending protests and picketing organised by the unemployed, teachers and state workers of San Juan. He was forced to drop out of university and return to Jujuy due to economic hardships, and upon his return, he began organising the PTS in his home province. Vilca sought to share the anti-capitalist and socialist ideals he had forged during his time in university.

Vilca became an employee at the San Salvador municipal government. In 2006, he led a protest alongside the Coordinadora Provincial de Trabajadores en Negro (a provincial trade union for informal sector workers), which grouped teachers and health workers, among other state workers, seeking higher wages and better work conditions. Following that, Vilca and another major activists involved in the protests were transferred to garbage collecting at the Alto Comedero neighbourhood. The protests would eventually pay off, however, as many of those workers were given contracts by the municipal government as they had requested.

Ahead of the 2011 general election, a number of trotskyist political parties, including the PTS, formed the Workers' Left Front to contest the election. Vilca was nominated as the alliance's candidate for governor of Jujuy: he received 1.93% of the vote. Four years later, in 2015, Vilca was the first candidate in the FIT list to the provincial legislature. He received 7.06% of the vote, nearly enough to be elected.

=== Provincial deputy ===
Ahead of the 2017 legislative election, Vilca was nominated as the first candidate in the FIT list to both the National Chamber of Deputies and the Legislature of Jujuy. Following a largely successful campaign, he received 17.74% of the vote in the general election, placing third overall – still not enough for him to be elected to the National Congress, but more than enough to elect Vilca to the provincial legislature alongside three other FIT candidates. He was sworn in as deputy on 4 December 2017.

=== National deputy ===
In the 2021 legislative election, Vilca once again ran for a seat in the National Chamber of Deputies on the FIT list. Both in the primary elections and in the general election, Vilca's list received over 23% of the vote, less than 1% away from the Frente de Todos list. It was the best result the FIT had ever seen in a provincial election. Vilca was elected, and he was sworn in as deputy on 7 December 2021.

In May 2023 he won 13% of the vote in the election for governor of Jujuy province.

== Electoral history ==
=== Executive ===
Electoral history of Alejandro Vilca
Election	Office	List	Votes			Result	Ref.
Election	Office	List	Total	%	P.	Result	Ref.
2011	Governor of Jujuy	Workers' Left Front	5,705	1.93%	5th	Not elected	
2023	Governor of Jujuy	Workers' Left Front	50,500	12.73%	5th	Not elected	

=== Legislative ===
Electoral history of Alejandro Vilca
Election	Office	List	#	District	Votes			Result	Ref.
Election	Office	List	#	District	Total	%	P.	Result	Ref.
2015	Provincial Legislator	Workers' Left Front	1	Jujuy Province	24,199	7.06%	3rd (Note: Presented on an electoral list. The data shown represents the share of the vote the entire party/alliance received in that constituency.)	Not elected	
2017	Provincial Legislator	Workers' Left Front	1	Jujuy Province	59,251	15.86%	3rd	Elected	
2021	National Deputy	Workers' Left Front	1	Jujuy Province	63.512	17.74%	3rd	Elected	
2025	Provincial Legislator	Workers' Left Front	1	Jujuy Province	31,175	8.44%	4th	Elected	
