= Gabriela Cerrano =

Argentine politician

Gabriela Cerrano (born 31 May 1977) is an activist in the Workers' Party (Argentina) who was elected as a provincial senator in Salta Province in November 2013.

In 2014 Cerrano intervened in a legal dispute over whether a 14-year-old girl raped and beaten by her stepfather was entitled to have an abortion. Cerrano went to the hospital where she was being held and demanded her transfer to another hospital to carry out the abortion.
