= Workers' Left Front =

Trotskyist political coalition in Argentina

Workers' Left Front – Unity Frente de Izquierda y de Trabajadores – Unidad
- Abbreviation: FIT-U
- Leader: Nicolás del Caño; Myriam Bregman
- Founded: 14 April 2011; 15 years ago
- Headquarters: Buenos Aires
- Ideology: Communism: Marxism; Trotskyism; Revolutionary socialism
- Political position: Left-wing to far-left
- Colours: Pink
- Seats in the Chamber of Deputies: 4 / 257
- Seats in the Senate: 0 / 72

The Workers' Left Front – Unity (Spanish: Frente de Izquierda y de Trabajadores – Unidad, FIT-U) is an electoral alliance of four Trotskyist parties in Argentina: the Workers' Party (PO), the Socialist Workers' Party (PTS), Socialist Left (IS), and the Workers' Socialist Movement (MST). Initially founded in 2011, the alliance added MST in 2019.

After the 2023 Argentine general election, the FIT-U has five national deputies in the National Congress of Argentina: Nicolás del Caño (PTS), Christian Castillo (PTS), Myriam Bregman (PTS), Alejandro Vilca (PTS), and Romina Del Plá (PO).

The predecessor of FIT-U was the Frente de Izquierda y los Trabajadores, Anticapitalista y Socialista, which consisted of the PTS, IS and New Movement for Socialism (NMAS). It stood in the 2009 legislative elections. Attempts to include the PO in this front broke down because the PO insisted on filling the first three positions on the lists with its own members.

== History ==
=== 2011 ===
On 12 June, they won a provincial deputy in Neuquén Province with 3.60% of the vote. The post will be held in rotation by Alejandro López, Raúl Godoy (PTS), Angélica Lagunas (IS) and Gabriela Suppicich (PO). (However, the deputies elected in June only took their seats on 10 December 2011, so each of the four sit for a year running from December to December.)

On 24 July, in the town of Capitán Bermúdez in Santa Fe Province, the PO had a councillor elected, Jorgelina Signa, with 17% of the vote.

On 7 August, Liliana Olivero of IS was re-elected to the Córdoba provincial legislature, this post will be rotated with Cintia Frencia (PO) and Laura Vilches (PTS). The list won 3.12% of the vote, this was largely concentrated in the provincial capital where it won 5.45%.

They stood Jorge Altamira of the PO for president and Christian Castillo of the PTS for vice-president on 23 October. On 14 August Altamira and Castillo won 527,237 votes, 2.46%, in a primary election.

On 23 October 2011, they came very close to winning a national deputy in two areas. In Buenos Aires city their vote was only 0.2% short. In Buenos Aires Province their share of the vote would have entitled them to a deputy, but they fell at a second hurdle where they needed to win 3% of the number of voters on the electoral register. The Front mounted a legal challenge to this hurdle, but the courts turned them down.

The Front participated in mobilisations in June 2012. In 2013, it put forward proposals to limit officials' salaries.

=== 2013 ===
The Front contested the election for Neuquén city council on 30 June 2013. It won 5.7% of the vote, around double its vote for this election in 2011, and roughly in line with its vote in the provincial election that year. Soon after it announced its candidates for the national election.

At the primary elections on 11 August 2013, the Front won over 900,000 votes, fairly close to doubling its vote compared to 2011. It increased its vote in nearly all provinces, in some provinces picking up a significant vote from virtually nowhere; an exception was Buenos Aires city where its vote was down marginally on 2011.

On 6 October, the PO had a strong performance in provincial primary elections in Salta Province, winning 22% in Salta city.

At the main election on 27 October, they won over a million votes, 5.11%, more than double their vote in 2011. They won three national deputies: Néstor Pitrola (PO) in Buenos Aires Province, Pablo Sebastián López (PO) in Salta and Nicolás del Caño (PTS) in Mendoza. There was a challenge to the result in Córdoba Province, where Liliana Olivero (IS) was the candidate.

They also won three provincial deputies (Cecilia Soria, Martín Dalmau and Héctor Fresina) and a provincial senator (Noelia Barbeito) in Mendoza, and one provincial deputy in each of Buenos Aires City (Marcelo Ramal), Buenos Aires Province (Christian Castillo) and Santiago del Estero (Andrea Ruiz), and five new councillors, all in towns in Mendoza Province.

On 10 November, the PO had a significant success in provincial elections in Salta Province, winning a provincial senator (Gabriela Cerrano) and four provincial deputies (Julio Quintana, Claudio del Plá, Gabriela Jorge and Norma Colpari) all elected in the provincial capital. They also won 17 councilors, including 9 out of the 21 seats on Salta city council, where the PO is now the largest party.

=== 2014 ===
On 29 January, the Front registered its alliance to contest the municipal election in Mendoza Province. In Mendoza, Argentina the list was headed by Macarena Escudero (PTS), a student, followed by Soledad Sosa and Andrés Elías (both PO). The PO headed the list in San Carlos, Mendoza.

On 30 March, the Front received 13.5% of the vote in Mendoza city, so Macarena Escudero was elected as a councillor.

=== 2015 ===
The Front's first election of 2015 was local primary elections on 22 February in Mendoza. The Front came 2nd with 16% of the vote, and Andrés Elías is predicted to be elected as a city councilor.

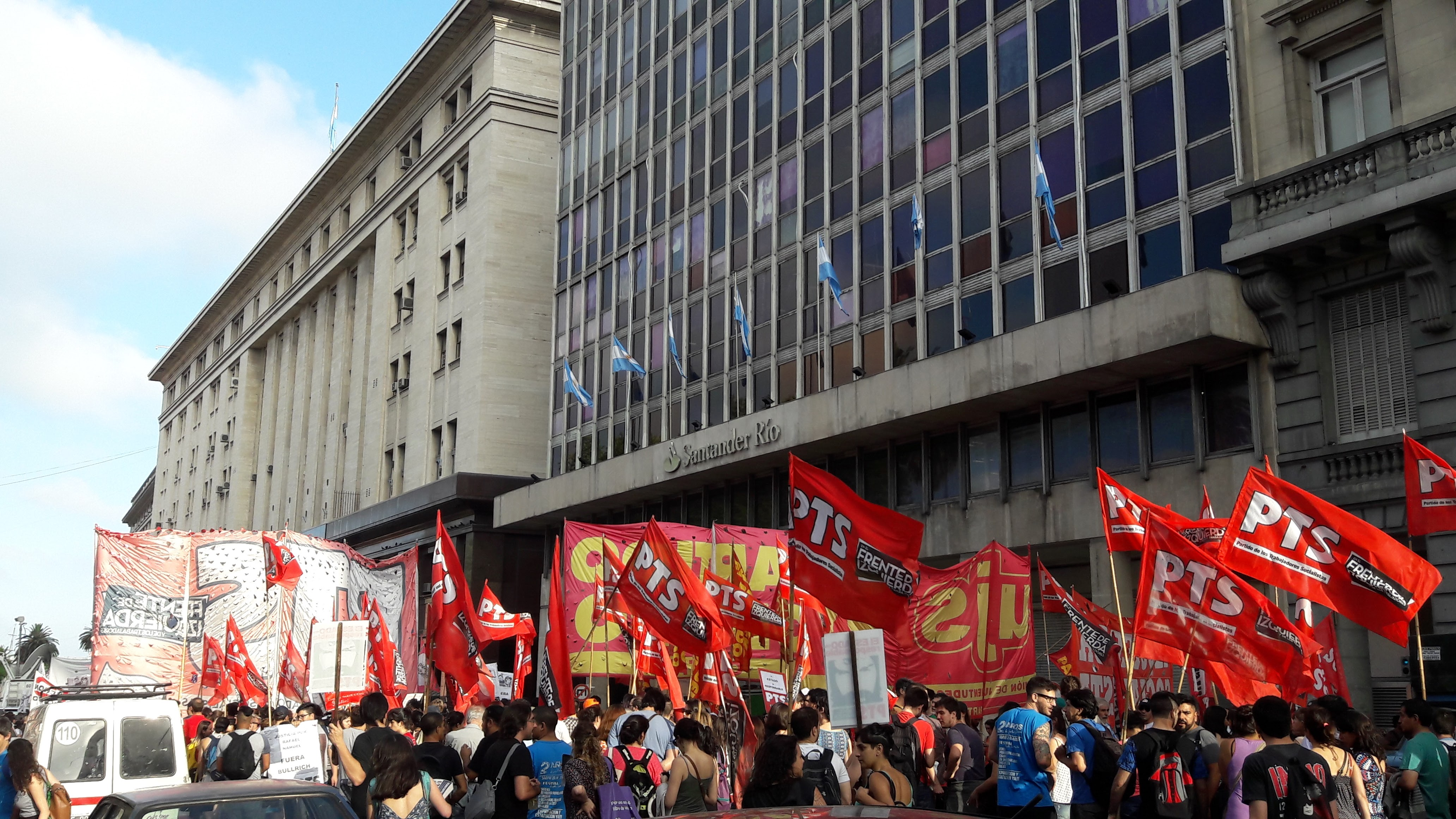
Workers' Left Front in December 2017

In April, it won a second provincial deputy in Neuquén. The seats will be held by Raúl Godoy (PTS) and Patricia Jure (PO), to be followed by Angélica Lagunas (IS). It also won a councilor in the town of Andacollo for the first time.

In June, in Mendoza Province Macarena Escudero was elected as a provincial deputy, and Víctor da Vila was elected as a provincial senator.

In the presidential elections, two formulas competed in the primaries in August: one represented by Nicolas del Caño and Myriam Bregman (both from the PTS) against another composed of Jorge Altamira (PO) and Juan Carlos Giordano (IS — Socialist Left). The PTS formula won, with 375,874 votes against 356,977 of the PO+IS one, both adding up to a 3.25% of the total vote. On the main elections in October, Nestor Pitrola was elected as a national deputy for the Buenos Aires province, becoming the fourth Workers' Left Front deputy in the chamber, while the presidential formula headed by Del Caño got 812,530 votes, 3.23% of the total.

=== 2019 ===
After several weeks of meetings, the Workers' Socialist Movement (MST) agreed on June 11, 2019, to join the Front for the October general election.

=== 2021 ===
At the 2021 Argentine legislative election, the Front had its best performance, winning 5.91% of the vote and four seats in the national Chamber of Deputies (two in Buenos Aires Province, one each in Buenos Aires City and Jujuy Province).

=== Presidency of Javier Milei ===
In 2024, member of the coalition and deputy Vanina Biasi was accused of Antisemitism by judge Daniel Rafecas on the advice of federal prosecutor Eduardo Taiano due to messages made by Biasi. The messages were described by La Nación as being "against Israel and in defense of Palestine" Biasi vehemently denied the accusations stating she's fought against Antisemitism and Racism for the past 30 years.

The coalition opposed the 2025 United States–Argentina currency swap in which the government of the United States extended $20 billion to Argentina in the form of a currency swap. They also opposed Javier Milei alignment with Israel.

In early 2026, a survey from the University of San Andrés found that 2023 presidential nominee coalition member Myriam Bregman had the lowest disapproval and highest net approval of all polled politicians. Bregman had the fourth highest approval of all figures polled. At 36.8%, she scored lower than figures such as Cristina Fernández de Kirchner and Javier Milei but above other notable figures such as Mauricio Macri and Axel Kicillof. A poll in March 2026 ahead of the 2027 Argentine general election had Myriam Bregman receiving 11.4% of the vote, if the results were to hold, they would be the best performance for the coalition, majorly improving on their 2.70% received in 2023. Christian Castillo attributed this rise to elements of the Justicialist Party shifting to the right.

== Presidential election results ==
=== 2011 ===
The 2011 Argentine general election saw incumbent President Cristina Fernández de Kirchner, in office since 2007, win a second term with 54% of the vote. This was the first election the Workers' Left Front compteted in.

President of Argentina
Jorge Altamira	Christian Castillo
for President	for Vice President
Member of the Buenos Aires City legislature (Aug. 2000 - 2003)	Professor
Votes: 503,372 (2.30%)

=== 2015 ===
2015 saw mayor of Buenos Aires Mauricio Macri win the election following a runoff between the mayor of Buenos Aires and the Governor of Buenos Aires Province Daniel Scioli in which the Workers' Left Front did not advance. The runoff was won by Mauricio Macri winning with 51.4% of the vote.

President of Argentina
Nicolas del Caño	Myriam Bregman
for President	for Vice President
Deputy for Mendoza Province (2013–2015)	Deputy for Buenos Aires Province (Jun. 2015 -)
Votes: 812,530 (3.23%)

=== 2019 ===
The 2019 Argentine general election saw the defeat of incumbent Mauricio Macri by Alberto Fernández. Fernández won with 48.1% of the vote.

President of Argentina
Nicolas del Caño	Romina del Plá
for President	for Vice President
Deputy for Buenos Aires Province (2017-) Deputy for Mendoza Province (2013–2015)	Deputy for Buenos Aires Province (2017-)
Votes: 579,228 (2.16%)

=== 2023 ===
2023 in Argentina saw Javier Milei win the 2023 Argentine general election with 55.7% of the vote. This victory came in the second round following a runoff after neither Javier Milei nor Sergio Massa achieved the required conditions to win. The Workers' Left Front did not advance to the runoff.

President of Argentina
Myriam Bregman	Nicolas del Caño
for President	for Vice President
Deputy for Buenos Aires City (2021-) (2015- Dec. 2016) Member of the Buenos Aires City legislature (2017–2021)	Deputy for Buenos Aires Province (2021-) (2017 - Jun. 2021) Deputy for Mendoza Province (2013–2015)
Votes: 722,061 (2.70%)

== Congressional elections ==
=== Background ===
Elections for the Argentine Chamber of Deputies utilize closed-list proportional representation to elect deputies for a 4-year term. Every 2 years, approximately half of the 257 deputies go up for election.

=== 2013 ===
In 2013, the coalition obtained 1,211,252 votes, or 5.36% of the vote for deputies.

Deputies elected
Deputy of Buenos Aires Province	for Deputy of Mendoza	for Deputy of Salta
Nestor Pitrola	Nicolás del Caño	Pablo Sebastián López
1st in list	1st in list	1st in list
Activist	Activist	Provincial Deputy (2001–2009)
Votes: 443,253 (5.03%) 1 / 35	Votes: 143,381 (14.03%) 1 / 5	Votes: 119,146 (18.88%) 1 / 3

=== 2015 ===
The 2015 Argentine general election saw the front win 982,953 votes or 4.22% of all votes cast.

Deputy elected
Nestor Pitrola
for Deputy of Buenos Aires Province
1st in list

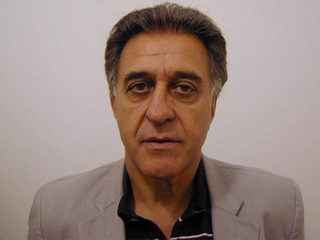

Deputy for Buenos Aires Province

(2013 - Jun. 2015)

Votes:

401,563 (4.46%)

1 / 35

=== 2017 ===
In 2017, the front won two deputies, both in Buenos Aires Province. The front improved on their performance, winning 1,156,160 votes, 4.73% of all votes cast for deputy.

Deputies elected
for Deputy of Buenos Aires Province
Nicolas del Caño	Romina del Plá
1st in list	2nd in list
Deputy for Mendoza Province (2013–2015)	Educator and Activist
Votes: 497,665 (5.34%) 2 / 35

=== 2019 ===
2019 saw the last time the front failed to win a seat in the Chamber of Deputies. The 2019 Argentine election gave the front 162,314 votes or 2.88% of total votes cast.

=== 2021 ===
The 2021 Argentine legislative election were held on November 14 following a 3-week delay due to the COVID-19 pandemic. November's elections saw a surge in support for the Workers' Left Front. In total, the Front received 1,280,240 votes, 5.50% of the total votes cast.

Deputies elected
for Deputy of Buenos Aires Province		for Deputy of Buenos Aires City	for Deputy of Jujuy
Nicolas del Caño	Romina del Plá	Myriam Bregman	Alejandro Vilca
1st in list	2nd in list	1st in list	1st in list
Deputy for Buenos Aires Province (2017- Jun. 2021) Deputy for Mendoza Province (2013–2015)	Deputy for Buenos Aires Province (2017 - Dec. 2020)	Deputy for Buenos Aires Province (2015 - Dec. 2016)	Member of the Jujuy legislature (2017–2021)
Votes: 609,158 (6.82%) 2 / 35		Votes: 142,581 (7.74%) 1 / 13	Votes: 100,892 (24.99%) 1 / 3

=== 2023 ===
In the 2023 Argentine general election, the front won 798,396 votes or 3.25% of all votes for deputy.

Deputy elected
for Deputy of Buenos Aires Province
Christian Castillo
1st in list

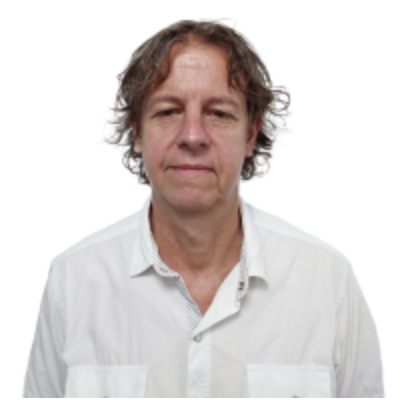

Member of the legislature of Buenos Aires Province

(2013–2015)

Votes:

407,973 (4.33%)

1 / 35

=== 2025 ===
The 2025 Argentine legislative election occurred on October 26, 2025. The front ran on a platform of:

- Raising the minimum wage to cover the cost of living,
- Opposing President Javier Milei's attempts to change laws relating to retirees and labor,
- Mandating political officials earn the same amount as teachers.
- Reducing the working day to 6 hours, 5 days a week.
- Ending payments to the International Monetary Fund.

All together, the Front won 904,434 votes, or 3.90% of the vote.

Deputies elected
for Deputy of Buenos Aires Province		for Deputy of Buenos Aires City
Nicolas del Caño	Romina del Plá	Myriam Bregman
1st in list	2nd in list	1st in list
Deputy for Buenos Aires Province (2021- Jul. 2025) (2017- Jun. 2021) Deputy for Mendoza Province (2013–2015)	Deputy for Buenos Aires Province (2021 - Jun. 2024) (2017 - Dec. 2020)	Deputy for Buenos Aires City (2021 - Jun. 2024) Deputy for Buenos Aires Province (2015- Dec. 2016)
Votes: 443,253 (5.03%) 2 / 35		Votes: 150,523 (9.12%) 1 / 13

== Seat rotation agreement ==
The Workers' front employs a rotation of who occupies its seats in the Argentine Chamber of Deputies. Deputies, national or provincial and municipal representatives, usually resign after half of their term has been completed. Some may stay on longer if they achieve a favorable result in a primary. The agreement is in place to guarantee all integrant parties a chance at sitting in the Argentine National Congress.

== See also ==
- List of electoral alliances in Argentina
