= Norma Colpari =

Argentine politician

Norma Elizabeth Colpari is an activist in the Workers' Party (Argentina).

In November 2013 she was elected as a provincial deputy in Salta Province for the provincial capital.
