= Guillermo Kane =

Argentinian politician (born 1981)

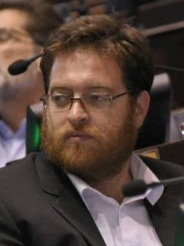
Guillermo Kane

Guillermo Kane (born 12 October 1981) is an Argentine activist in the Workers' Party.

He studied at the University of Buenos Aires, and now teaches history there.

From July 2015 to December 2016 he was a deputy in the legislature of Buenos Aires Province, as part of the rotation of seats by the Workers' Left Front.

He was a candidate in the 2017 Argentine provincial elections.

He became a deputy in Buenos Aires province again in December 2021.
