= Myriam Bregman =

Argentine lawyer and politician (born 1972)

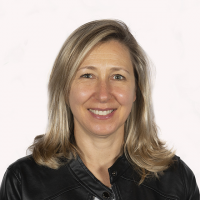
- Official portrait, 2021

National Deputy
- In office 10 December 2021 – 27 June 2024
- Constituency: City of Buenos Aires
- In office 10 December 2015 – 6 December 2016
- Constituency: Buenos Aires

Legislator of the City of Buenos Aires
- In office 10 December 2017 – 10 December 2021

Personal details
- Born: 25 February 1972 (age 54) Timote, Argentina
- Party: Workers' Left Front (since 2011)
- Other political affiliations: Socialist Workers' Party
- Education: University of Buenos Aires
- Profession: Lawyer, politician

Myriam Teresa Bregman (Spanish pronunciation: [ˈmiɾjam teˈɾesa ˈbɾeɣman]; born 25 February 1972) is an Argentine lawyer, activist, and politician. Raised in a Jewish family, Bregman joined the Socialist Workers' Party (PTS), a Trotskyist Argentine party of which she is among the most prominent members, while studying for a degree in law at the University of Buenos Aires in the 1990s.

Bregman was one of the lawyers who took the case of Jorge Julio López, an eyewitness of the 1970s military dictatorship who disappeared in 2006 after testifying against Miguel Osvaldo Etchecolatz, who was sentenced to life imprisonment and charged with genocide accusations for the crimes he committed during the dictatorship. In 1997, Bregman founded the Professionist Center for Human Rights (CeProDH), which defends and assesses laid off and unemployed workers and intervenes against repression and impunity, and the Justicia Ya! (Justice Now) Collective, who are appellants in cases of crimes against humanity during the dictatorship's regime of state terrorism.

Bregman first ran for a seat in Congress in 2009 and for Chief of government of the City of Buenos Aires in 2011 and 2015 as part of the Workers' Left Front (comprising, among others, the PTS). In 2015, she became a national deputy for Buenos Aires Province, holding the seat by rotation for the Workers' Left Front (FIT) until 2016 and being widely supported by several sectors. From December 2017 to December 2021, she served as a deputy in the legislature for the City of Buenos Aires, where she was president of the Human Rights and Anti-Discrimination Commission. She also ran as vice-presidential candidate for the Front in the 2015 Argentine general election, coming fourth. In 2021, she was again elected to the national Chamber of Deputies, this time for the Autonomous City of Buenos Aires. In the 2023 Argentine general election, she ran for president as head of the Workers' Left Front alliance.

== Labour cases ==
As a lawyer, Myriam Bregman represented workers in labour disputes. In 1998, she was legal counsel in a historic case in which the Zanon tile company in Neuquén was found guilty of an "offensive lockout". Additionally, Bregman was counsel for Catalina Balaguer, a female PepsiCo worker who was terminated for her labor activism. Bregman also represented PepsiCo workers in a lawsuit over the illegal closure of the Vicente López factory on June 20, 2017. Among the named defendants was prosecutor Gastón Larramendi, who had ordered the factory's eviction a week earlier.

== Cases against state repression and persecution ==
Bregman has participated in several court cases defending activists and workers from police repression and political and trade union persecution. She is also part of Carla Lacorte's team of lawyers. Lacorte, victim of repression herself, is also a member of the CeProDH along with Bregman. Bregman also participates in the case investigation of Federal Police agent Américo Balbuena, who infiltrated social organizations to spy on them.

== Cases on crimes against humanity ==
Bregman participated among the appellants of the first trial made since the re-opening of the cases of crimes against humanity perpetrated by criminals of the Argentinian Dictatorship, that of former Buenos Aires police chief Miguel Osvaldo Etchecolatz, where Justicia Ya! La Plata in 2006 accused him of committing genocide. In the final stages of the trial, one of the eyewitnesses, Jorge Julio López, disappeared; afterwards, a case on his disappearance was opened and remains so. Bregman was also an appealing lawyer during the trial against Jorge “Tigre” Acosta, on the ESMA case.

Bregman intervened on the oral trials against crimes committed in the Higher School of Mechanics of the Navy (ESMA mega-case) against prefect Héctor Febrés (2007), and in the second trial against 18 genocide criminals, representing, among others, the case of Rodolfo Walsh, Raimundo Villaflor and organisations such as the Former Disappeared Detainees Association (2009–2011). She was also an appealing lawyer during the oral trial against Cristian Federico Von Wernich in La Plata (2007), accusing him of crimes against humanity committed in Campo de Mayo, the “Floreal Avellaneda” case in San Martín, Province of Buenos Aires (2009), "Seré Mansion" case (against Buenos Aires and Mar del Plata repressors in 2008), among others.

In 2008, Bregman was awarded by the Human Rights Commission of the Lawyers School of Buenos Aires. In 2016, Carlos Blaquier and Ledesma executives sent her an intimidatory letter as she prepared to travel to Jujuy to receive complaints of grave human rights violations in the province of then-governor Gerardo Morales. Bregman denounced that she received phone call threats in her office after her intervention in the Labour and Budget Commission where she questioned the first employment bill because she considered that it was a measure to legalise outsourcing. She is also among the people who founded and manage the Professionist Center for Human Rights (CeProDH).

== Women's rights activist ==
On 31 May 2018, Bregman assisted to the 15th day of debate on legalizing Abortion in Argentina in the Argentine Congress to present her position in favour of legalizing abortion by declaring that "we are proud to see many young people with the green handkerchief as their banner". She also took the opportunity to criticise the Catholic Church and La Plata Archbishop Héctor Aguer, who "has as their transmission band local governors, who negotiate with women's rights".

== Personal life ==
Bregman is a Jewish atheist and is of German Jewish descent.

== Electoral history ==
=== Executive ===
Electoral history of Myriam Bregman
Election	Office	List	Votes			Result	Ref.
Election	Office	List	Total	%	P.	Result	Ref.
2011	Chief of Government of Buenos Aires	Workers' Left Front	13,804	0.78%	10th	Not elected	
2015	Chief of Government of Buenos Aires	Workers' Left Front	56,617	3.10%	5th	Not elected	
2015	Vice President of Argentina	Workers' Left Front	812,530	3.23%	4th	Not elected	
2023	President of Argentina	Workers' Left Front	722,061	2.70%	5th	Not elected	

=== Legislative ===
Electoral history of Myriam Bregman
Election	Office	List	#	District	Votes			Result	Ref.
Election	Office	List	#	District	Total	%	P.	Result	Ref.
2013	National Deputy	Workers' Left Front	2	Buenos Aires Province	449,450	5.01%	5th (Note: Presented on an electoral list. The data shown represents the share of the vote the entire party/alliance received in that constituency.)	Not elected (Note: Assumed office on 10 June 2015 following the resignation of Néstor Pitrola.)	
2017	City Legislator	Workers' Left Front	1	City of Buenos Aires	132,161	6.28%	4th	Elected	
2021	National Deputy	Workers' Left Front	1	City of Buenos Aires	142,581	7.74%	4th	Elected	
2025	National Deputy	Workers' Left Front	1	City of Buenos Aires	148,438	9.11%	3rd	Elected	
