= Claudio del Plá =

Argentinian politician (born 1959)

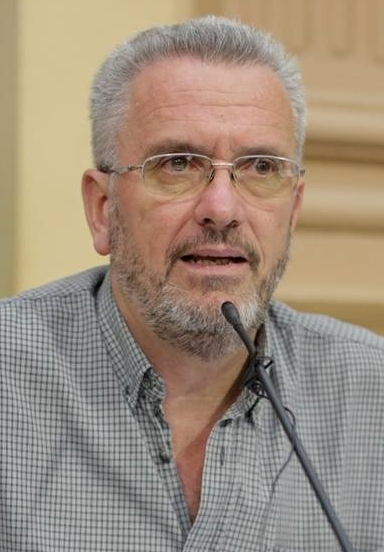
Portrait of Claudio del Plá

Claudio Ariel del Plá (born 8 September 1959) is a member of the provincial legislature of Salta Province in Argentina.

He was elected for a 4-year term in 2009, as a candidate of the Partido Obrero in the provincial capital, and was re-elected in 2013.

In 2011 he came 4th in the election for governor of Salta Province. He will be the PO's candidate for governor at the next election.

== See also ==
- Pablo Sebastian Lopez
