= Socialist Workers' Party (Argentina) =

Political party in Argentina

Socialist Workers' Party Partido de los Trabajadores Socialistas
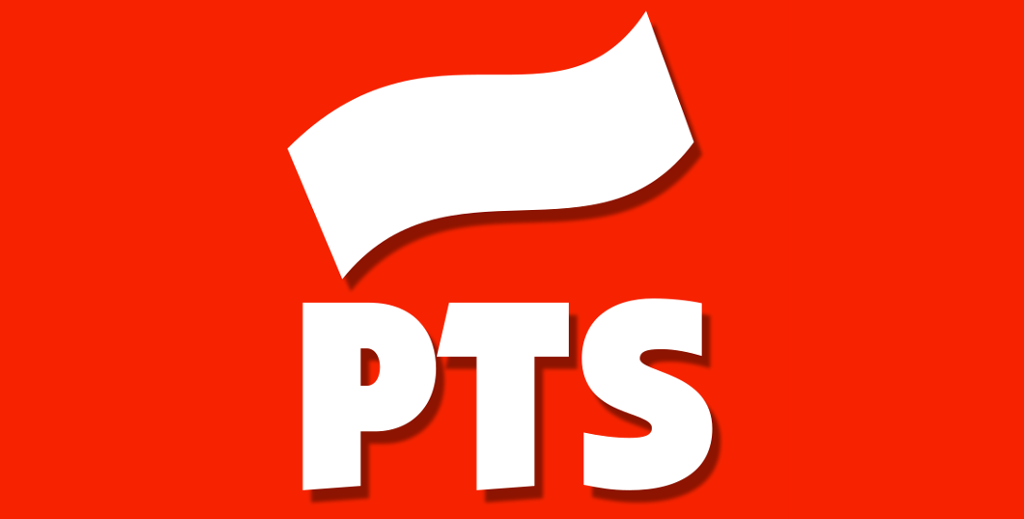
- Abbreviation: PTS
- Leader: Nicolás del Caño
- President: José Montes
- Founded: 1988
- Split from: Movement for Socialism
- Headquarters: Buenos Aires
- Newspaper: La Verdad Obrera (1992–2015); La Izquierda Diario (2015–)
- Think tank: Karl Marx Institute of Socialist Thought (IPS Karl Marx); León Trotsky Study, Research and Publishing Center (CEIP León Trotsky)
- Student wing: En Clave Roja (Universities); No Pasarán (High schools)
- Youth wing: Juventud del PTS
- Women's wing: Pan y Rosas
- Union wing: Movimiento de Agrupaciones Clasistas
- Ideology: Communism; Trotskyism; Marxist feminism
- Political position: Far-left
- National affiliation: Workers' Left Front
- International affiliation: Trotskyist Fraction – Fourth International
- Colours: Red
- Seats in the Chamber of Deputies: 2 / 257
- Seats in the Senate: 0 / 72
- Seats in the Buenos Aires City Legislature: 2 / 60

Website
- pts.ar

The Socialist Workers' Party (Spanish: Partido de los Trabajadores Socialistas, PTS), previously known as the Workers Party for Socialism (Partido de Trabajadores por el Socialismo), is a Trotskyist political party in Argentina. It was founded in 1988 by expelled members of the Movement for Socialism (MAS). MAS was a Trotskyist party led by Nahuel Moreno until his death.

After the 2023 Argentine general election, the PTS has four national deputies in the National Congress of Argentina: Nicolás del Caño, Christian Castillo, Myriam Bregman, and Alejandro Vilca.

Located on the far left side of the political spectrum and member of the Workers' Left Front, the PTS aims to establish a working-class government that breaks with capitalism, putting forth a material hegemonic force grounded in the main combats and organization processes of the working class—such as the student and women's movement—, seeking to develop revolutionary factions within them.

By establishing this electoral coalition, the PTS managed to enter the Argentine Congress for the first time after the legislative elections of 2013. As part of the Front, it obtained representation in the Buenos Aires Legislature, as well as the provincial legislatures of Buenos Aires, Córdoba, Jujuy, Mendoza and Neuquén and in the city councils of Godoy Cruz, Las Heras, Maipú and Mendoza in Mendoza and the city councils of Libertador General San Martín, Palpalá and San Salvador in Jujuy. It has four national deputies, including Nicolás del Caño; current or recent provincial deputies include Christian Castillo, Raúl Godoy, Myriam Bregman, Laura Vilches and Laura Cano.

The PTS has presence in the majority of provinces and in Buenos Aires City; its members have seats in the Buenos Aires Underground union (AGTSyP), the Neuquén ceramics workers union (SOECN), the Western Soapmakers Workers Union (SOJO), as well as occupying secretaries in the United Argentinian Tire Workers Trade Union (SUTNA), the United Trade Union of Education Workers (SUTE, Mendoza) and several sections of the Buenos Aires Education Workers Trade Union (SUTEBA) etc. Its youth branch conducts the student unions in highschools, and the universities of Buenos Aires (UBA), La Plata (UNLP), General Sarmiento (UNGS), Quilmes (UNQ) and Comahue (UNCo). The PTS also publishes the digital newspaper La Izquierda Diario (the daily left), located among the top 100 most visited websites in the country.

== History ==
=== Origins ===
The Internationalist Bolshevik Faction, which was expelled from the Movement for Socialism (MAS), became the PTS in 1988. The Internationalist Bolshevik Faction had formed towards the MAS's third congress. In the Internationalist Bolshevik Faction's first documents it was declared that the MAS had a revisionist definition of internationalism and had degenerated into a "national-trotskyist" organization, polemising against the MAS's then-official policy that claimed that "Argentina was the center of world revolution". In these documents, the Internationalist Bolshevik Faction upheld the political legacy of Nahuel Moreno and held that the MAS's leadership had "degenerated" after Moreno's death. Later as the PTS, after suffering three schisms, the PTS published several critical balance sheets about Moreno's positions. The PTS broke with Moreno's political tradition/heritage, ideology (termed Morenoism) and tendency (the IWL). Currently, the PTS defines itself as:

«A revolutionary Marxist organization whose theoretical, programatic, and principle basis are found in the legacy of over 150 years of struggle of the socialist and labour movement, the Communist Manifesto, the critiques to the Gotha and Erfurt programmes, the lessons of the Paris Commune, the lessons of the 1905 and 1917 Russian Revolutions, of the First and Second Internationals, the Communist International in its first four Congresses, the struggle of the Left Opposition against the bureaucratization and Stalinist thermidor, of the theory-programme of Permanent Revolution, the Transitional Programme and the banners of the Fourth International founded by Leon Trotsky.»

=== Labour movement ===
The Socialist Workers' Party has presence in several unions. They occupy seats in the leadership of the Buenos Aires subway union (AGTSyP), is part of the joint Multicolor slate that leads nine sections of the teachers' union of the Buenos Aires Province (SUTEBA), they also were part of the opposition slate in the Buenos Aires Graphic Federation and is part of the union leadership in several graphic companies. The Violet slate (whose members include PTS militants and independent activists) is the main opposition slate within the telephone union (FOETRA), the PTS also leads the opposition slate in the food union (STIA), where it is part of the union leadership within the factories with the largest number of workers. Aside from its presence in unions and guilds, the PTS has an extensive presence within internal commissions and delegates in industrial companies (soapmakers, soda workers, metalworkers, steelers, etc.), services (railroad workers, aeronautical workers, etc.) and state and health workers, etc.

The PTS has also spearheaded some of the most important conflicts within the industrial labour movement that have shaken the public opinion, such as leading the struggle of the occupied tile factory FaSinPat (formerly Zanón), which led to the filming of the documentary The Take by Naomi Klein, as well as the struggle in the Kraft Foods factory (now Mondelez) in 2009. More recently, they were active participants in the occupation of the Donnelley printing factory, a conflict that gained wide national trascendence and is currently a worker-controlled factory. The PTS was also participant of the struggle of the Lear Corporation workers, which was considered by the CEOs of the main companies in the country as one of the most important conflicts in 2014, which included 240 dismissals, 21 demonstrations in the main highway of Buenos Aires, 16 days of Struggle with pickets throughout the country, 5 repressions, 22 detainees, 80 injured, 16 judicial measures in favor of the workers, two weeks of lockout by the bosses and so on.

=== Before the FIT ===
In 1999, José Montes, rank-and-file delegate of the Río Santiago Shipyard, ran as presidential candidate along Oscar Hernández, Siderar worker, as vicepresident under the slogan "workers vote for workers" (in Spanish: "trabajador vote trabajador") and stressing not to pay the foreign debt.

In the 2001 legislative elections, the PTS presented candidates in 7 districts, obtaining 105,849 votes for national deputies. After the 2001 crisis, the PTS refused to run candidates for the 2003 elections, calling for boycott and for a "general strike until all of them go and impose a Revolutionary Constituent Assembly”.

For the 2007 elections, the PTS formed a coalition with the NMAS and Socialist Left under the name "Left and Workers' Front for Socialism" (in Spanish: Frente de Izquierda de los Trabajadores por el Socialismo), winning nearly 100,000 votes (0,57%) with José Montes as candidate. In 2009, the PTS participated in a similar coalition named "Front of the Left and the Workers, Anti-capitalists and Socialists" (in Spanish: Frente de Izquierda y los Trabajadores, Anticapitalista y Socialista), achieving the fifth place in important districts such as Córdoba and the Buenos Aires Province, duplicating their votes that year.

=== Workers' Left Front ===
In 2011, the PTS formed, along with the Workers' Party (PO) and Socialist Left (IS) the Workers' Left Front (FIT from its Spanish acronym), which stood Jorge Altamira (PO) as presidential candidate and Christian Castillo (PTS) as vice-president. In the primary elections they obtained 500.000 votes and in the general elections 660.000 for national deputies.

In 2013, as member of the FIT, the PTS had parliamentary representation in Córdoba, Neuquén, and other provinces.

In the 2013 elections, the FIT won nearly 1,300,000 votes nationally. Nicolás del Caño, as member of the FIT, was elected as national deputy for the Mendoza province with 14% of votes. In June 2015, Myriam Bregman also won a seat as PTS deputy for Buenos Aires Province.

In the 2015 elections in Mendoza, Noelia Barbeito, PTS candidate for governor, got third place with 110 226 votes (10,32%). Nicolás del Caño, in the elections for mayor of that province's capital city, was the second most voted candidate with 17% of votes and winning over the Front for Victory.

In the primary elections of August 2015, the PTS, presenting their slate with Nicolás del Caño as presidential candidate and Myriam Bregman as vice-president, won with 51,07% (370.764 votes) in the inner elections against the PO-IS slate that proposed Jorge Altamira as president and Juan Carlos Giordano as vice-president, which obtained 48,93% (355.290 votes). The PTS slate also won in 13 provinces.

== Organization ==
=== Publications ===
The PTS created the Karl Marx Institute for Socialist Thought And the Leon Trotsky Research, Study and Publications Center, the latter of which is recognised as the only one in South America dedicated to publishing and spreading of the Russian revolutionary's works and that of the international trotskyist movement. Both institutions possess a library of over 3,000 volumes specialized in Marxism and the history of the international and Argentine labour movement and are located in a building in downtown Buenos Aires (Riobamba 144), where courses and seminars are dictated and several research projects are organised.

The PTS has also published several individual works such as the "Lucha de Clases" (class struggle)magazine, having its own contributions written to update fundamental elements of Marxism to contemporary reality.

For over a decade the PTS has also taught the Karl Marx Free Cathedra in several universities of Argentina. The Free Cathedra is a series of conferences made to discuss ideologically and whose main subjects have a wide variety of topics, from analising Marxist theory to interpreting current historical phenomena through it.

It used to have a printed newspaper, called La Verdad Obrera ("working-class truth"), but since 2015 it publishes the digital online newspaper La Izquierda Diario ("the daily left"), and the digital weekly magazine Ideas de Izquierda ("ideas from the left"). Along the Trotskyist Fraction - Fourth International, its international organization, the PTS used to publish the International Strategy magazine. The PTS and the Trotskyist Fraction - Fourth International also publishes several books on Marxist theory and compilations of classic authors.

It also has a website that is daily updated, renewed since early 2007 with multimedia information.

Every week, the PTS hosted the radio talk show "Pateando el Tablero" ("kicking the board"), now known as El Círculo Rojo (the red circle), as well as similar talk shows in several parts of the country.

Since March 24, 2009, the PTS broadcast an Internet TV program called TVPTS, with live transmissions, DVD productions and projections in giant screens. Its website is daily updated and has over 2000 ranging from several topics. Furthermore, the PTS organises the cinema group Contraimagen, which has produced several documentaries.

Since 2012, the PTS made the TV program Giro a la Izquierda (turn to the left), in the city of Córdoba, broadcast through CanalC.

=== Youth ===
In all 20 universities of the country, the PTS organises students through their student branch "En Clave Roja" (red key), conformed by PTS youth militants and independent activists. In highschools, the PTS does the same through their student branch "No Pasarán". It's part of the school presidencies of the Social Science and Philosophy schools of the University of Buenos Aires, the Humanities School of the UNGS (General Sarmiento) and the IUNA. Nationally, along with women students and independent female workers, the PTS makes work through its women branch Pan y Rosas (Bread and Roses). Between late 2010 and early 2011, the party's youth organization was re-structured and they formed the PTS Youth as a general youth branch that groups both university and highschool students as well as young worker militants.

=== International ===
The PTS, internationally, is the largest section of the Trotskyist Fraction – Fourth International, being a founding section of it along the Worker Revolutionary League of Bolivia and the Workers' League for Socialism - Contracorriente (now known as the Socialist Workers' Movement) of Mexico; other members include the Workers' Revolutionary Movement of Brazil, the Venezuelan Workers' League for Socialism, the Revolutionary Workers' Party of Chile, the Workers' Current for Socialism of Uruguay, the Revolutionary Internationalist Organisation of Germany, Permanent Revolution in France, and the Workers' Revolutionary Current of Spain.

== Electoral history ==
=== Presidential elections ===
Year	Formula	First round		Result	Notes
Year	Formula	votes	% votes	Result	Notes
1995	Alcides Christiansen - José Montes	27.643	0,16	✗ Not elected (11th place)	Movement for Socialism - PTS
1999	José Montes - Oscar Hernández	44.551	0,24	✗ Not elected (9th place)	Contested alone
2007	José Montes - Héctor Heberling	84.694	0,44	✗ Not elected (10th place)	Left and Workers' Front for Socialism
2011	Jorge Altamira - Christian Castillo	503.372	2,30	✗ Not elected (6th place)	Workers' Left Front
2015	Nicolás del Caño - Myriam Bregman	812.530	3,23	✗ Not elected (4th place)	Workers' Left Front
2019	Nicolás del Caño - Romina Del Plá	579,228	2.16	✗ Not elected (4th place)	Workers' Left Front
2023	Myriam Bregman - Nicolás del Caño	722,061	2.70	✗ Not elected (5th place)	Workers' Left Front

=== Congress elections ===
Year	Votes	%	Deputies	Senators	Notes
2011	582,770	2,82%	0 / 130	0 / 24	Workers' Left Front
2013	1,224,144	5,25%	3 / 127	0 / 24	Workers' Left Front
2015	982,953	4.18%	1 / 130	0 / 24	Workers' Left Front
2017	1,051,300	4.28%	2 / 127	0 / 24	Workers' Left Front
2019	739,366	2.96%	0 / 130	0 / 24	Workers' Left Front
2021	1,305,518	5.53%	4 / 127	0 / 24	Workers' Left Front
2023	798,396	3,25 %	1 / 130	0 / 24	Workers' Left Front
