= Néstor Pitrola =

Argentine politician

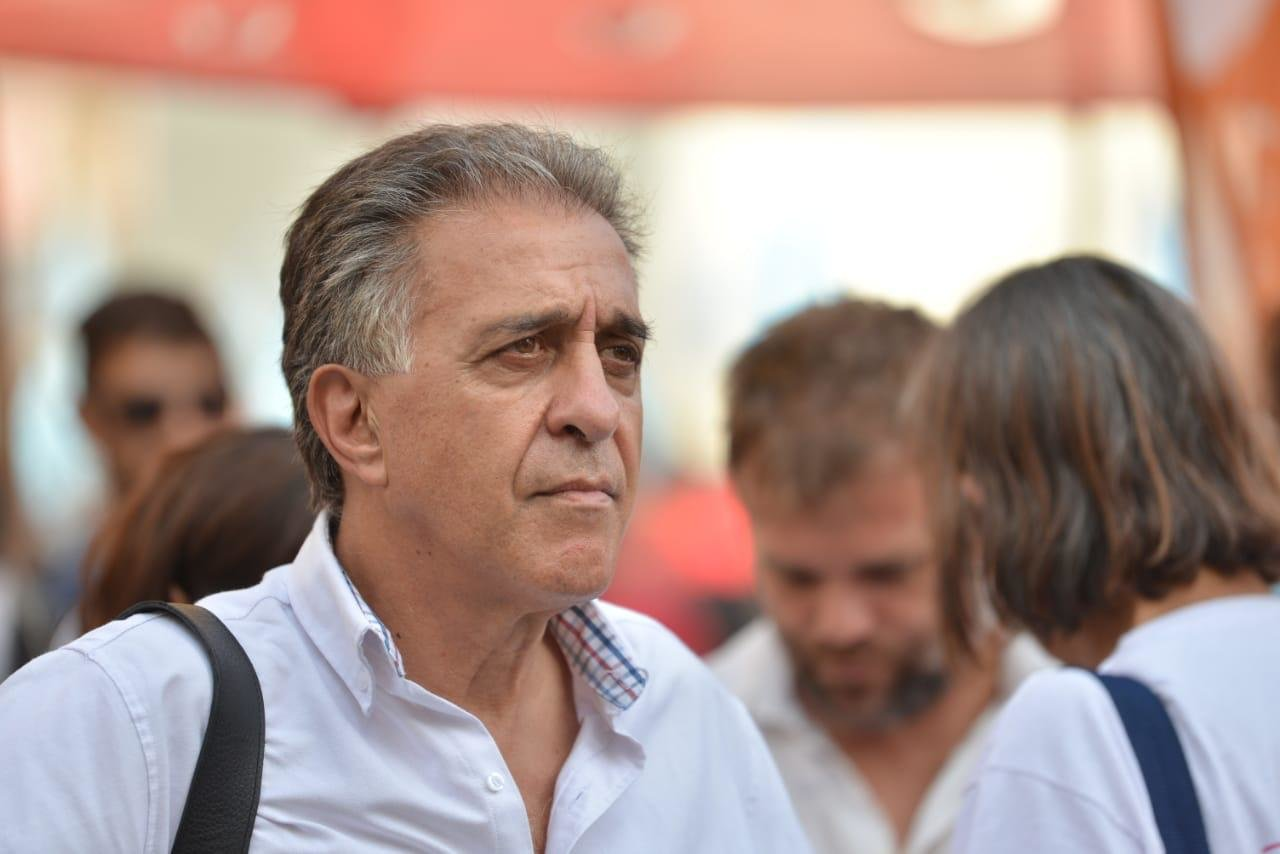

Néstor Antonio Pitrola (born 1 April 1952, in Córdoba) is an Argentine trade unionist and leading member of the Workers' Party (Partido Obrero) of Argentina.

Pitrola was his party's candidate for President of Argentina in October 2007. He and his running mate Gabriela Arroyo gained 113,004 votes, amounting to 0.62% of the vote in ninth place.

== Education and career ==
- He did his secondary studies in Córdoba, where he was a student leader.
- He began working as a bank clerk, was elected delegate from the Bank Galicia in the first half of the 70s.
- After the coup of 1976 he moved to Buenos Aires, working in the printing industry and was elected the first delegate of the Editorial Atlantida and then, in 1984, deputy general secretary of the Graphical Federation.
- In 1997, the plant closed Atlantis Publishing Garin, organized a protest picketing cutting the Panamerican Highway. Within the Labour Party (Argentina), helped organize the Polo Obrero, a group that achieved a significant presence within the picket movement.
- In 2005 he ran for national deputy for the province of Buenos Aires, gaining 1.5% http://towsa.com/andy/totalpais/2007p.html.
- He ran for President of the Nation by his party in the 2007 presidential elections, gaining 0.75%.
- In 2009 he ran for national deputy for the province of Buenos Aires

He won a seat for the Workers' Left Front as national deputy for Buenos Aires Province at the 2013 Argentine legislative election. He held the seat in rotation, in June 2015 he handed over to Myriam Bregman.

In October 2015 he was re-elected as a national deputy for BA Province, winning the Front's second seat for that province.

As of the start of 2026 he is a national deputy for BA Province, as part of the rotation of the Front's seat won in 2023. He is married with two children.
