= Raúl Godoy =

Argentine politician (born 1965)

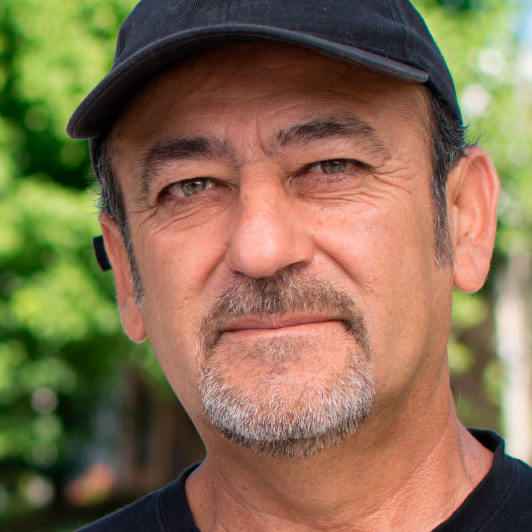

Deputy of the Province of Neuquén
- In office 10 December 2015 – 10 December 2019
- In office 11 December 2013 – 13 December 2012

Secretary-General of SOECN
- In office 2005–2000

Personal details
- Born: 16 November 1965 (age 61) Neuquén, Argentina
- Party: Socialist Workers' Party
- Other political affiliations: Workers' Left Front (since 2011)
- Profession: Ceramist, politician

Raúl Eduardo Godoy (Province of Neuquén, November 16, 1965) is an argentine ceramic worker and politician. He is founder of the Socialist Workers' Party (PTS) and was a provincial deputy of Neuquén on two occasions for the Workers' Left Front (FIT-U). He was general secretary of the Union of Ceramic Workers and Employees of Neuquén (SOECN) between 2000 and 2005, being one of the most important people during the conflict for the workers' recovery of the Zanon tile factory, renamed FaSinPat.

== Electoral history ==
=== Provincial Candidate ===
==== 2011 ====
In the 2011 Neuquén provincial elections, he was the second candidate on the Left Front list to join the provincial legislature, after obtaining 10,479 votes, 3.87% of the total, Alejandro Elías López of the Brown Group of ceramists assumed office as provincial deputy, being the first position obtained by the FIT-U in its history. After his resignation in 2012, Godoy took over, who also resigned in 2013 following the agreement to rotate the seats of the Left Front, in favor of Angélica Noemí Lagunas of the Socialist Left. After her resignation in 2014, María Gabriela Suppicich of the Workers' Party completed the term until 2015.

==== 2015 ====
In the 2015 Neuquén provincial elections, he was the first candidate for provincial deputy for the Left Front, obtaining 16,176 votes, 4.78% of the total. He assumed his position on December 10, 2015, and fulfilled his mandate on December 10, 2019.Upon completing his term, he returned to his job at the recovered FaSinPat factory.

==== 2019 ====
In the 2019 Neuquén provincial elections, he was a candidate for provincial governor, accompanied by Pablo Giachello of the Partido Obrero as vice-governor, obtaining 13,143 votes, 3.52% of the total, finishing in fifth place.

==== 2023 ====
In the 2023 Neuquén provincial elections, he was a candidate for provincial vice-governor, accompanying the candidate for governor Patricia Jure of the Partido Obrero. Obtaining 13,513 votes, 3.37% of the total.

=== National Candidate ===
==== 2021 ====
In the 2021 legislative elections, he was the first candidate for national deputy for the province of Neuquén, obtaining 30,974 votes, 8.20% of the total.

==== 2023 ====
In the 2023 elections he was the first Mercosur parliamentary candidate in the national district for the Left Front. He obtained 788.382 votes, 3.12% of the total.

Año	Candidatura	Partido	Eleccion	Votos	Porcentaje	Resultado
2011	Provincial Deputy for the Province of Neuquén	PTS / FIT	Provincial	10.479	3,87%	Not elected
2015	Provincial Deputy for the Province of Neuquén	PTS / FIT	Provincial	16.179	4,78%	Elected
2019	Governor of the Province of Neuquén	PTS / FIT-U	Provincial	13.143	3,52%	Not elected
2021	National Deputy for the Province of Neuquén	PTS / FIT-U	Legislative	30,974	8.20%	Not elected
2023	Vice-governor of the Province of Neuquén	PTS / FIT-U	Provincial	13,513	3,37%	Not elected
2023	Mercosur Parliamentarian	PTS / FIT-U	Parlasur	788.382	3.12%	Not elected
Fuentes
