= Jorge Altamira =

Argentine politician

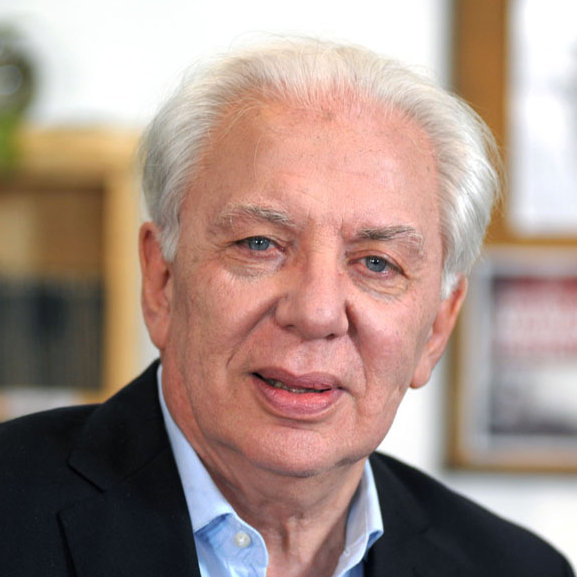
- Born: José Saúl Wermus; 14 April 1942 (age 84); Buenos Aires, Argentina
- Occupations: Activist, politician

Jorge Altamira (born José Saúl Wermus in 1942) is an Argentine activist and politician leading the Workers' Party (Partido Obrero) in Argentina.

== Biography ==
Altamira was born José Saúl Wermus (sometimes spelled "José Huermus") in Buenos Aires, on 14 April 1942. Altamira's parents on both sides were ethnically Ashkenazi Jewish but spiritually atheist and he was raised without religious conviction. Son of a printing worker active in the Graphist Union, Altamira began participating in the labor movement at an early age, and took part in a number of strikes. Altamira had a son. He founded an advocacy magazine, Política Obrera, in 1964, and, later a party by the same name. The party was banned following the March 1976 coup, however, though in 1982, amid the political liberalization that preceded the 1983 return to democracy, he founded the Workers' Party of Argentina. He was among five Workers' Party leaders arrested during the 1989 riots in Argentina on suspicion of incitement; the charges were later dropped.

Altamira was elected to the Buenos Aires City Legislature in 2000. He pursued a vigorous labor rights agenda during his tenure at the legislature, and proposed a six-hour workday for Buenos Aires Metro employees working underground, a law protecting workers' self-management of bankrupt businesses, a hike in the minimum wage to cover the poverty line in the city (higher than in most of the rest of Argentina), and a universal healthcare coverage law. He has unsuccessfully run for both a seat in the Argentine Chamber of Deputies, as well as for the Presidency, and is one of the nine members of the Co-ordinating Committee for the Refoundation of the Fourth International.

He was the Workers' Left Front's no. 1 candidate for Buenos Aires city in the 2013 Argentine legislative election, but he did not obtain a seat.
