= 2023 Argentine primary elections =

- 13 August 2023
- Presidential primary
- Opinion polls
- Registered: 35,405,013
- Turnout: 70.43%
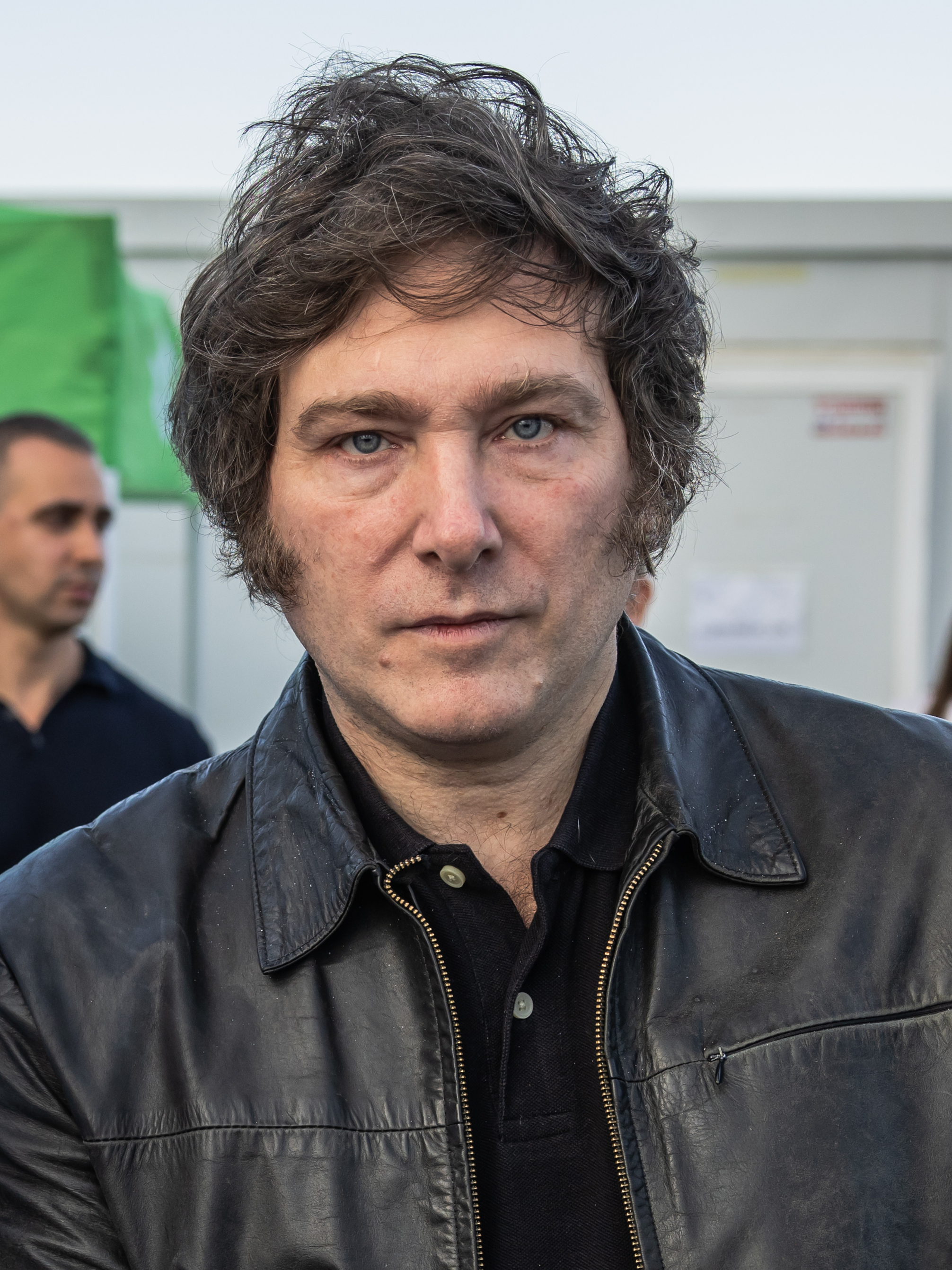

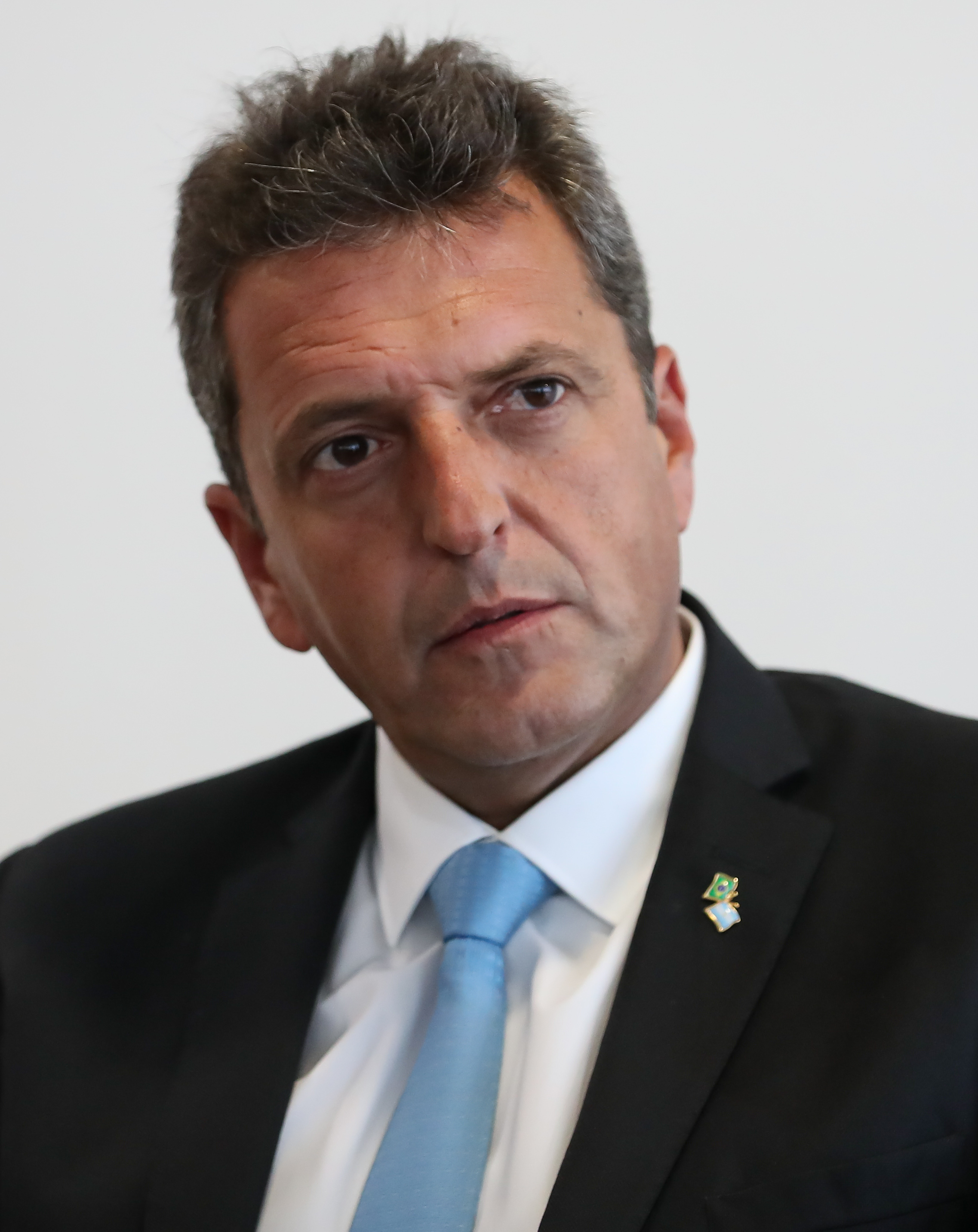

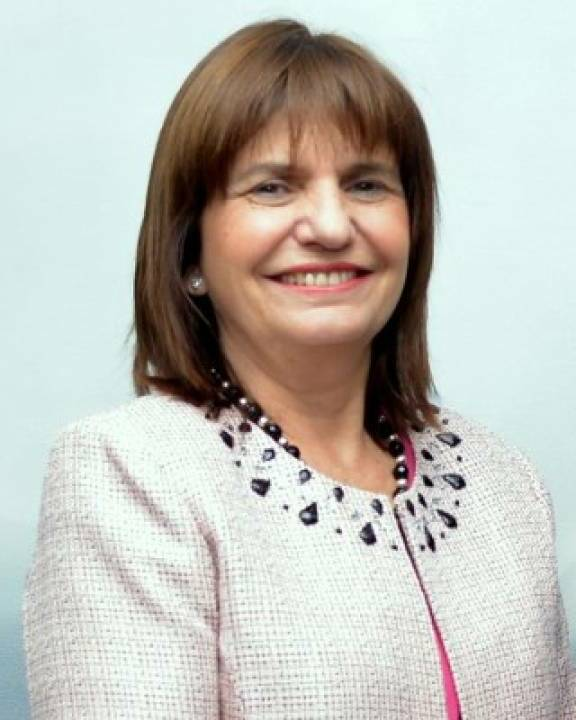

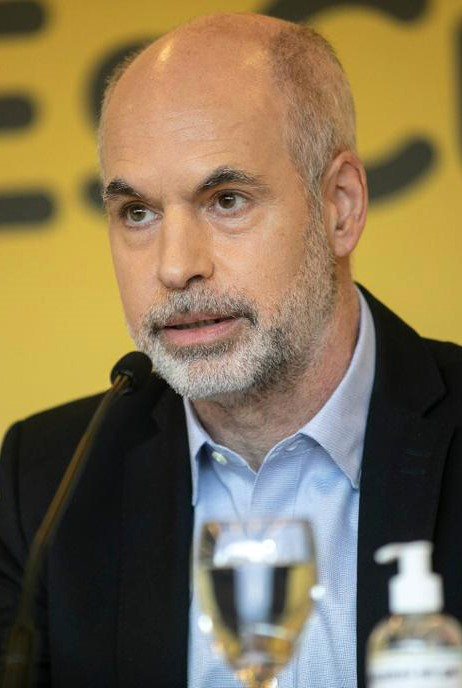

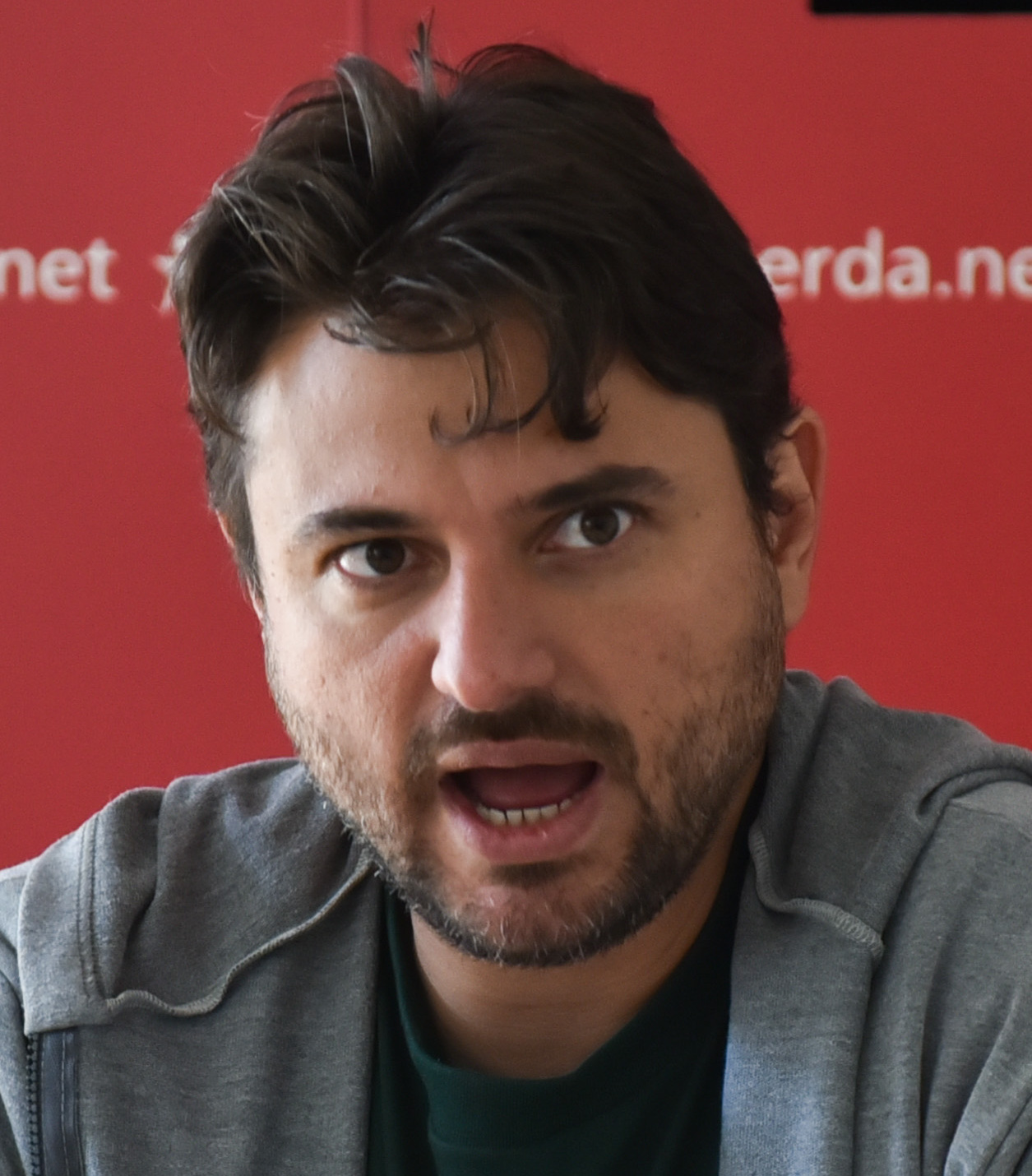
Nominee	Javier Milei	Sergio Massa	Patricia Bullrich
Party	PL	FR	PRO
Alliance	LLA	UP	JxC
Running mate	Victoria Villarruel	Agustín Rossi	Luis Petri
States carried	16	5	2 + CABA
Popular vote	7,352,244	5,277,538	4,139,566
Percentage	29.86%	21.43%	16.81%
Nominee	Horacio Rodríguez Larreta	Juan Grabois
Party	PRO	FPG
Alliance	JxC	UP
Running mate	Gerardo Morales	Paula Abal Medina
States carried	0	0
Popular vote	2,756,375	1,441,504
Percentage	11.19%	5.85%
- Legislative primary

On 13 August 2023, the Simultaneous and Mandatory Open Primaries (PASO) were held in Argentina to determine candidatures for national offices in the presidential and legislative elections on 22 October 2023. It was the first election where Peronism lost and ended in third place.

== Background ==
In these primary elections, the candidates for President of Argentina and national legislators (national senators and deputies) will be elected. However, the fronts that will compete independently, to be qualified for the general elections in October, must meet the requirement of reaching at least 1.5% of the valid votes. While in the fronts with several candidates, the candidate with the most votes with the aforementioned minimum is enabled.

The elections for provincial offices (governors, provincial deputies, provincial senators, etc.) and municipal (mayors, councilors, etc.) are independent of the elections for national offices and may or may not be held on the same dates.

Citizens of 16 years of age and also people of 15 years of age who turn before October 27 (with the exception of the province of Córdoba) will also be authorized to vote.

The Simultaneous and Mandatory Open Primaries (PASO) will be held on 13 August 2023. With this system, the candidates are elected within each alliance, in the same mandatory electoral act, in which citizens can vote for any pre-candidate from any party, but they can only cast one vote. When there is more than one pre-candidate per alliance, the one that obtains the most votes will be chosen as that alliance's candidate for the general elections, to be held two months later. The PASO also define which forces can appear in the general elections, since only those that obtain a minimum of 1.5% of the valid votes can do so.

It had the particularity that in the City of Buenos Aires (CABA), to vote for the head of the Buenos Aires government, an electronic ballot was used.

== Lists ==
=== Presidential ===
Alliance	List		Pre-Candidates		Ref.
Alliance	List		President	Vice President	Ref.
Union for the Homeland	134 A	Celeste y Blanca	Sergio Massa	Agustín Rossi	
Union for the Homeland	134 B	Justa y Soberana	Juan Grabois	Paula Abal Medina	
Juntos por el Cambio	132 A	El Cambio de Nuestras Vidas	Horacio Rodríguez Larreta	Gerardo Morales	
Juntos por el Cambio	132 B	La Fuerza del Cambio	Patricia Bullrich	Luis Petri	
La Libertad Avanza	135 A	Libertad por Siempre	Javier Milei	Victoria Villarruel	
Workers' Left Front	136 A	Unir y Fortalecer a la Izquierda	Myriam Bregman	Nicolás del Caño	
Workers' Left Front	136 B	Unidad de Luchadores y la Izquierda	Gabriel Solano	Vilma Ripoll	
Hacemos por Nuestro País	133 A	Hacemos	Juan Schiaretti	Florencio Randazzo	
Principles and Values	137 1A	Tierra, Techo y Trabajo	Guillermo Moreno	Leonardo Fabre	
Principles and Values	137 2B	Transformar	Eliodoro Martínez	Vicente Souto	
Principles and Values	137 3C	Tres Banderas	Jorge Oliver	Ezequiel San Martín	
Principles and Values	137 4D	Gente de Trabajo	Carina Bartolini	Mabel Gómez	
Principles and Values	137 5E	Laborista	Paula Arias	Walter Vera	
Frente Liber.AR	131 A	Demos	Nazareno Etchepare	Fernando Lorenzo	
Frente Liber.AR	131 B	Reconquista	Ramiro Vasena	Aníbal Lagonegro	
Frente Liber.AR	131 C	Anticorrupción	Julio Bárbaro	Ramona Pucheta	
Freemen of the South	40 A	Azul y Rojo	Jesús Escobar	Marianella Lezama Hid	
New Movement for Socialism	13	Izquierda Anticapitalista	Manuela Castañeira	Lucas Ruiz	
Política Obrera	92	Unidad Obrera	Marcelo Ramal	Patricia Urones	
Youth and Dignity Left Movement	90 A	Dignidad	Raúl Castells	Adriana Reinoso	
Youth and Dignity Left Movement	90 B	Confederal	Santiago Cúneo	Gustavo Barranco	
Proyecto Joven	94 A	Coalición Paz, Democracia y Soberania	Mempo Giardinelli	Bárbara Solernou	
Proyecto Joven	94 B	Patria Unida	Martín Ayerbe	Hugo Rodríguez	
Proyecto Joven	94 C	Todex	Reina Xiomara Ibáñez	Gonzalo Ibarra	
Federal Patriot Front	95	Primero la Patria	César Biondini	Mariel Avedaño	
Union of the Democratic Centre	20 A	Apertura Liberal Argentina	Andrés Passamonti	Pamela Fernández	
Neighborhood Action Movement	57	Compromiso Vecinal	Raúl Albarracín	Sergio Pastore	

== Election day ==
=== Turnout ===
Primary	Hour									Final	Ref(s).
Primary	12:00	+/-	14:00	15:00	+/-	16:00	17:00	+/-	18:20	Final	Ref(s).
2019	30%	▼2%	42%	48%	0%	58%	66%	▼4.5%	—	76.4%	
2023	28%	▼2%	—	48%	0%	—	61.5%	▼4.5%	66%	69,6%	

== Results ==
=== Presidential primaries ===
Party	Presidential candidate	Running mate	Candidate votes		Overall votes	
Party	Presidential candidate	Running mate	Votes	%	Votes	%
La Libertad Avanza	Javier Milei	Victoria Villarruel	7,352,244	29.86	7,352,244	29.86
Together for Change	Patricia Bullrich	Luis Petri	4,139,566	16.81	6,895,941	28.00
Together for Change	Horacio Rodríguez Larreta	Gerardo Morales	2,756,375	11.19	6,895,941	28.00
Union for the Homeland	Sergio Massa	Agustín Rossi	5,277,538	21.43	6,719,042	27.28
Union for the Homeland	Juan Grabois	Paula Abal Medina	1,441,504	5.85	6,719,042	27.28
We Do for Our Country	Juan Schiaretti	Florencio Randazzo	914,812	3.71	914,812	3.71
Left and Worker's Front-Unity	Myriam Bregman	Nicolás del Caño	451,275	1.83	642,773	2.61
Left and Worker's Front-Unity	Gabriel Solano	Vilma Ripoll	191,498	0.78	642,773	2.61
Principles and Values	Guillermo Moreno	Leonardo Fabre	189,756	0.77	194,160	0.79
Principles and Values	Eliodoro Martínez	Vicente Souto	2,516	0.01	194,160	0.79
Principles and Values	Paula Arias	Walter Vera	1,507	0.01	194,160	0.79
Principles and Values	Jorge Oliver	Ezequiel San Martín	197	0.00	194,160	0.79
Principles and Values	Carina Bartolini	Mabel Gómez	184	0.00	194,160	0.79
Freemen of the South Movement	Jesús Escobar	Marianella Lezama Hid	158,840	0.65	158,840	0.65
New Movement for Socialism	Manuela Castañeira	Lucas Ruiz	87,681	0.36	87,681	0.36
Youth and Dignity Left Movement	Santiago Cúneo	Gustavo Barranco	57,754	0.23	84,361	0.34
Youth and Dignity Left Movement	Raúl Castells	Adriana Reinoso	26,607	0.11	84,361	0.34
Workers' Party	Marcelo Ramal	Patricia Urones	64,213	0.26	64,213	0.26
Federal Patriot Front	César Biondini	Mariel Avedaño	51,850	0.21	51,850	0.21
Neighbourhood Action Movement	Raúl Albarracín	Sergio Pastore	43,480	0.18	43,480	0.18
Youth Project	Mempo Giardinelli	Bárbara Solernou	11,944	0.05	24,304	0.10
Youth Project	Martín Ayerbe	Hugo Rodríguez	8,829	0.04	24,304	0.10
Youth Project	Reina Xiomara Ibáñez	Gonzalo Ibarra	3,531	0.01	24,304	0.10
Liber.AR	Ramiro Vasena	Aníbal Lagonegro	12,990	0.05	23,554	0.10
Liber.AR	Nazareno Etchepare	Fernando Lorenzo	7,732	0.03	23,554	0.10
Liber.AR	Julio Bárbaro	Ramona Pucheta	2,832	0.01	23,554	0.10
Union of the Democratic Centre	Andrés Passamonti	Pamela Fernández	12,041	0.05	12,041	0.05
Blank votes					1,356,480	5.51
Total					24,625,776	100
Valid votes					24,625,776	98.76
Invalid votes					309,807	1.24
Total votes					24,935,583	100
Registered voters/turnout					35,405,013	70.43

=== Legislative primaries ===
==== Chamber of Deputies ====
Party or alliance		Votes	%
Together for Change	The Force of Change (Patricia Bullrich) (Note: incl. Sumamos Fuerzas en Santa Cruz, Gana Catamarca)	3,188,982	15.09
Together for Change	The Change of Our Lives (Horacio Rodríguez Larreta) (Note: Podés Confiar, Sigamos Cambiando Jujuy, Juntos por La Pampa, Cambia San Juan)	2,389,539	11.31
Together for Change	Together for Change (Note: Entre Ríos, Mendoza, Chaco)	666,070	3.15
Together for Change	Corrientes Meeting	210,239	1.00
Together for Change	Wake Up Chubut	66,465	0.31
Together for Change	Radical Civic Union (Note: Radical Change, UCR A Real Path)	16,528	0.08
Together for Change	UNIR Constitutional Nationalist Party	2,193	0.01
Together for Change	Salta Renewal Party	2,062	0.01
Together for Change	Total	6,542,078	30.97
Union for the Homeland	Celestial and White (Sergio Massa) (Note: Buenos Aires, Catamarca, Cordoba, Corrientes, Formosa, Jujuy, La Rioja, Mendoza, Neuquén, Río Negro, Tierra del Fuego, Tucumán)	4,615,399	21.85
Union for the Homeland	Union for the Homeland (Note: Capital Federal, Entre Ríos, La Pampa, Misiones, San Luis, Santa Fe)	725,777	3.44
Union for the Homeland	Civic Front for Santiago	271,519	1.29
Union for the Homeland	October 17th	195,009	0.92
Union for the Homeland	Union for Salta	80,886	0.38
Union for the Homeland	Let's Go San Juan	72,453	0.34
Union for the Homeland	Union for Victory	68,388	0.32
Union for the Homeland	Union for Chubut	61,179	0.29
Union for the Homeland	San Juan Comes Back	58,696	0.28
Union for the Homeland	Renewal Unity	37,980	0.18
Union for the Homeland	Union for Jujuy	34,204	0.16
Union for the Homeland	Santa Cruz Agreement	17,937	0.08
Union for the Homeland	Let's Build Together	14,287	0.07
Union for the Homeland	Union for the Happiness of Salta	9,533	0.05
Union for the Homeland	The María Eva	9,083	0.04
Union for the Homeland	Rebuild Chubut	3,638	0.02
Union for the Homeland	Total	6,275,968	29.71
La Libertad Avanza	La Libertad Avanza	5,003,813	23.68
La Libertad Avanza	Ahora Patria	312,289	1.48
La Libertad Avanza	Republican Force	261,028	1.24
La Libertad Avanza	Partido Renovador Federal	141,173	0.67
La Libertad Avanza	Partido Fe	134,656	0.64
La Libertad Avanza	Arriba Neuquén	132,991	0.63
La Libertad Avanza	Light Blue and White Union	125,077	0.59
La Libertad Avanza	Republicanos Unidos	29,886	0.14
La Libertad Avanza	Fuerza Liberal	8,939	0.04
La Libertad Avanza	Total	6,149,852	29.11
Hacemos por Nuestro País	Hacemos por Nuestro País	709,431	3.36
Hacemos por Nuestro País	Christian Democratic Party (Note: incl. Foro Social Cristiano)	16,109	0.08
Hacemos por Nuestro País	Aptitud Renovadora	15,465	0.07
Hacemos por Nuestro País	Federal Commitment	13,051	0.06
Hacemos por Nuestro País	Partido Autonomista (Note: in Salta)	10,648	0.05
Hacemos por Nuestro País	Socialist Party (Note: incl. Hacemos Juntos)	8,058	0.04
Hacemos por Nuestro País	Partido Unión y Libertad	6,553	0.03
Hacemos por Nuestro País	Federal Popular Union (Note: in Misiones)	6,222	0.03
Hacemos por Nuestro País	Nuevo Espacio de Opinión	2,215	0.01
Hacemos por Nuestro País	Nueve de Julio	2,203	0.01
Hacemos por Nuestro País	Patria Grande	1,987	0.01
Hacemos por Nuestro País	Santiago lo Merece	1,387	0.01
Hacemos por Nuestro País	Santiago Autonomista	1,197	0.01
Hacemos por Nuestro País	Total	794,526	3.76
Workers' Left Front	Unir y Fortalecer a la Izquierda (PTS–IS)	428,898	2.03
Workers' Left Front	Unidad de Luchadores y la Izquierda (PO–MST)	186,610	0.88
Workers' Left Front	Party of Workers	7,576	0.04
Workers' Left Front	New Left	6,684	0.03
Workers' Left Front	Total	629,768	2.98
Freemen of the South Movement	Freemen of the South Movement	126,983	0.60
Freemen of the South Movement	Libres y Socialistas	12,419	0.06
Freemen of the South Movement	Total	139,402	0.66
Principles and Values	Tierra, Techo y Trabajo (Guillermo Moreno) (Note: incl. Populares Cba)	54,537	0.26
Principles and Values	Gobernar es Crear Trabajo	21,787	0.10
Principles and Values	Santa Fe Primero	7,298	0.03
Principles and Values	Unidad Santafesina	5,526	0.03
Principles and Values	Por los Principios Sociales	4,732	0.02
Principles and Values	Partido Popular	3,665	0.02
Principles and Values	Movimiento Integración Latinoamericana de Expresión Social	3,318	0.02
Principles and Values	Producción y Trabajo	2,154	0.01
Principles and Values	Producción y Justicia Social	2,273	0.01
Principles and Values	Por Club, Capilla y Colegio	1,860	0.01
Principles and Values	La Nueva Santa Fe	1,440	0.01
Principles and Values	Ciudadanos	1,130	0.01
Principles and Values	Unidos por la Gente	1,067	0.01
Principles and Values	Crezcamos por Santa Fe	837	0.00
Principles and Values	Voces Libertarias SdE	783	0.00
Principles and Values	Recuperando Nuestra Cultura	629	0.00
Principles and Values	Por los Valores	255	0.00
Principles and Values	Total	113,291	0.54
New MAS		50,052	0.24
Youth and Dignity Left Movement	Confederal (Santiago Cúneo)	25,309	0.12
Youth and Dignity Left Movement	Dignidad (Raúl Castells)	10,424	0.05
Youth and Dignity Left Movement	Santa Fe Segura	1,579	0.01
Youth and Dignity Left Movement	Total	37,312	0.18
Together We Are Río Negro		36,762	0.17
Neuquén People's Movement	Neuquén País	30,737	0.15
Neuquén People's Movement	Unidos por Neuquén	5,264	0.02
Neuquén People's Movement	Total	36,001	0.17
Política Obrera		35,330	0.17
Renewal Front (Note: in Santiago del Estero)		24,089	0.11
Patriot Front		23,193	0.11
Nueva Unión Celeste		21,381	0.10
Partido Agrario y Social		21,098	0.10
Salta Independiente		16,897	0.08
Libertarian Party		14,023	0.07
Proyecto Joven	Paz, Democracia y Soberanía	6,530	0.03
Proyecto Joven	Frente Joven	1,747	0.01
Proyecto Joven	Unidos	1,330	0.01
Proyecto Joven	Patria Unida (Martín Ayerbe)	1,019	0.00
Proyecto Joven	Nuevas Ideas	587	0.00
Proyecto Joven	Centro, Norte y Sur Unidos	567	0.00
Proyecto Joven	Jóvenes en Acción	466	0.00
Proyecto Joven	Viva la Libertad	244	0.00
Proyecto Joven	Patria y Futuro	175	0.00
Proyecto Joven	DEMOS Libertad	123	0.00
Proyecto Joven	Total	12,788	0.06
Encuentro Republicano Federal	Movimiento Viable	5,516	0.03
Encuentro Republicano Federal	Moderado	1,658	0.01
Encuentro Republicano Federal	Republicano Popular	1,126	0.01
Encuentro Republicano Federal	DEMOS	878	0.00
Encuentro Republicano Federal	Despierta Santiago	570	0.00
Encuentro Republicano Federal	Total	9,748	0.05
Buenos Aires Primero		9,044	0.04
Construyendo Porvenir		8,590	0.04
Somos Fueguinos		8,562	0.04
Por Santa Cruz		8,283	0.04
Frente Amplio por la Soberanía		7,627	0.04
Nuevo Rumbo	Federal Commitment	1,979	0.01
Nuevo Rumbo	Por los Valores	1,836	0.01
Nuevo Rumbo	Recreo Social	1,818	0.01
Nuevo Rumbo	Vecinos con Rumbo	1,718	0.01
Nuevo Rumbo	Total	7,351	0.03
Corriente de Pensamiento Bonaerense		7,347	0.03
Política Abierta para la Integridad Social	Primero Santa Fe	2,541	0.01
Política Abierta para la Integridad Social	Con los Mismos, No	1,951	0.01
Política Abierta para la Integridad Social	Azul Única	1,541	0.01
Política Abierta para la Integridad Social	Total	6,033	0.03
Partido Fe	Nuevo Horizonte	2,577	0.01
Partido Fe	Vamos con Fe	2,123	0.01
Partido Fe	Siempre con Fe	1,279	0.01
Partido Fe	Total	5,979	0.03
Partido Todos por Buenos Aires		5,443	0.03
Confianza Pública		5,343	0.03
Partido Autonomista (Note: in Santa Fe)	Futuro Mejor	1,756	0.01
Partido Autonomista	Dignidad Animal	1,293	0.01
Partido Autonomista	Autonomista en Marcha	1,239	0.01
Partido Autonomista	Renacer	1,045	0.00
Partido Autonomista	Total	5,333	0.03
Movimiento de Organización Democrática		4,891	0.02
Union of the Democratic Centre	La Libertad Primero	3,462	0.02
Union of the Democratic Centre	Union of the Democratic Centre	835	0.00
Union of the Democratic Centre	Total	4,297	0.02
Democratic Party		4,277	0.02
Partido Unidad Social		4,193	0.02
Frente Federal de Acción Solidaria		3,963	0.02
Frente Liber.AR	Demos (Nazareno Etchepare)	2,766	0.01
Frente Liber.AR	Anticorruption (Julio Bárbaro) (Note: Campo Popular in Córdoba)	1,184	0.01
Frente Liber.AR	Total	3,950	0.02
Frente Integrador		3,811	0.02
Movimiento Independiente Renovador		3,283	0.02
Estamos		3,395	0.02
Justicia y Dignidad Patriotica		2,756	0.01
Movimiento de Acción Vecinal		2,596	0.01
Republicanos Unidos		2,341	0.01
Generation for a National Encounter		2,215	0.01
Christian Democratic Party (Note: in Capital Federal)		1,990	0.01
Renewal Crusade		1,943	0.01
Movimiento de Jubilados y Juventud		1,942	0.01
La Nueva Independencia		1,926	0.01
Humanist Party		1,923	0.01
Labour Party	Libertad y Trabajo	1,394	0.01
Labour Party	La Clase Obrera	184	0.00
Labour Party	Frente Laborista	150	0.00
Labour Party	Total	1,728	0.01
Partido Tres Banderas	Soberanía	696	0.00
Partido Tres Banderas	Por La Justicia	328	0.00
Partido Tres Banderas	Independencia	318	0.00
Partido Tres Banderas	Total	1,342	0.01
Auténticos Liberales Catamarca	Libertarios	9	0.00
Auténticos Liberales Catamarca	Liberar y Popular	6	0.00
Auténticos Liberales Catamarca	Total	15	0.00
Total		21,127,271	100.00

== Reactions ==
Milei and his coalition's win achieved international recognition and headlines, from The New York Times to El País and Latin American media and Asian news agencies, which reported on Milei's surprise win and the uncertain electoral scenario in Argentina for the 2023 October general election. Analysts saw his win as the voters being frustrated by both Peronist and non-Peronist governments.

== See also ==
- 2023 Argentine general election
- 2023 Argentine provincial elections
