= Opinion polling for the 2023 Argentine general election =

This article contains polls on voters' intentions regarding the 2023 Argentine general election, which will elect the country's president and vice president for the 2023–2027 period.

== First round ==
A candidate needs to win 45% of the vote, or win 40% of the vote while finishing more than 10 percentage points ahead of the second-place candidate in order to win the presidency in the first round and avoid the second round occurring. This was not the case here, as the leading candidate had 36.7% of the vote, so a second round has been scheduled for 19 November 2023.

=== Graph ===
Local regression trend line of survey results from 14 November 2021 to today.

=== By political coalition ===
==== 2023 ====
Fieldwork date	Polling firm	Sample	Union for the Homeland	Juntos por el Cambio	La Libertad Avanza	Workers' Left Front		Others	No one	Undecided	Lead
22 October 2023	General elections		36.68	23.83	29.98	2.70	6.78	-		-	6.7
14 October 2023		Beginning of legal ban on publishing polls and electoral forecasts for the general elections									
10–13 October 2023	Atlas Intel	5,702	30.9	24.4	26.5	3.2	10.0	-	1.1	2.8	4.4
9–12 October 2023	Consultora Tendencias	17,702	29.8	23.1	30.2	3.9	4.6	-	2.1	6.3	0.4
9–11 October 2023	Clivajes Consultores	1,240	31.4	26.8	33.1	2.1	3.6	-	-	-	1.7
9–11 October 2023	Circuitos Consultora	2,131	32.3	24.4	34.1	2.3	2.1	-	1.1	2.5	1.8
9–11 October 2023	CB Consultora	4,069	29.1	21.8	29.9	6	3.4	-	3.2	6.6	0.8
2–11 October 2023	Opinaia	2,000	29	22	32	7	3	-	-	-	3
8–10 October 2023	Atlas Intel	4,248	30.6	25	25.2	3.9	11.8	-	0.7	2.1	5.4
7–10 October 2023	DC Consultores	2,700	26.2	28.9	35.6	2.7	3.4	-	-	3.2	6.7
3–9 October 2023	Proyección Consultores	2,966	30.9	23.2	35.5	3.4	2.7	-	-	4.3	4.6
5–8 October 2023	CIGP	1,500	28.1	20.9	27.2	5.8	1.3	-	5.9	16.7	0.9
30 September–7 October 2023	Giacobbe & Asociados	2,500	28.5	27.3	32.9	4.2	3.3	-	-	3.8	4.4
2–5 October 2023	Fixer	2,506	26.1	25.4	34.3	5.5	3.1	-	-	-	8.2
3–4 October 2023	Zuban Córdoba & Asociados	1,400	32.7	25.0	34.7	2.7	1.6	-	0.8	1.4	2
28 September–3 October 2023	Reale Dalla Torre	2,615	24.7	21.8	36.2	5.0	3.8	-	-	8.5	11.5
21–29 September 2023	Aresco	1,200	32.1	25.9	35.0	4.7	2.3	-	3.9	2.1	2.9
25–28 September 2023	CB Consultora	4,072	28.9	23.7	32.2	3.1	2.1	-	3.8	6.2	3.3
20–25 September 2023	Atlas Intel	3,778	30.7	27.7	27.9	4.8	2.1	-	1.8	3.8	2.8
20–25 September 2023	Circuitos Consultora	2,188	31.2	24.8	34.6	1.9	1.8	-	2.4	2.2	3.4
14–25 September 2023	UdeSA	1,000	29.8	26.4	34.7	6	3	-	3.8	-	4.9
22 September 2023	Aresco	-	30.1	23.0	35.5	2.8	2.8	-	4.2	1.6	5.4
16–21 September 2023	Proyección Consultores	2,260	29.1	24.2	33.7	2.6	2.3	-	4.1	8.1	4.6
11–20 September 2023	Opinaia	2,000	26	23	33	5	3	-	3	7	7
9–18 September 2023	Giacobbe & Asociados	2,500	27.4	27.8	33.9	3	2.5	-	1.2	4.2	6.1
1–20 September 2023	CELAG	2,509	32.2	28.1	33.2	3.6	2.9	-	-	-	1
4–10 September 2023	Opina Argentina	2,359	29	25	34	2	3	-	4	3	5
6–8 September 2023	Federico González y Asociados	2,400	29.4	29.7	33.1	4.0	3.9	-	4.7	7.1	3.4
3–5 September 2023	Analogías	2,398	28.1	21.2	31.1	2.1	3.4	-	2.1	11.4	3
29 August–4 September 2023	Synopsis	2,653	30.6	25.8	36.0	2.4	1.8	-	0.7	2,6	5.4
1–3 September 2023	Consultora Tendencias	25,704	28.5	22.7	33.2	2.9	4.4	-	1.9	6.4	3.7
22–31 August 2023	Opinión Lab	1,006	20.5	16.1	28.1	4.0	3.0	-	5.1	13.4	7.6
22–30 August 2023	CEOP	1,441	30.6	24.8	34.2	2.2	0.8	-	2.3	4.6	3.6
13–25 August 2023	Opinaia	2,000	25	23	35	5	3	-	4	5	10
18–21 August 2023	Analogías	2,523	26.8	20.9	32.1	3.2	4.9	-	2.3	9.9	5.3
16–18 August 2023	DC Consultores	2,100	23.1	24.7	34	-	-	-	2.4	15.8	9.3
16–17 August 2023	OPSA	4,623	32.3	23.7	38.5	3.2	2.3	-	-	-	6.2
14–16 August 2023	CB Consultora	4,340	28.1	25.3	32.3	3.8	1.8	-	3.2	5.4	4.2
13 August 2023	Primary elections	-	27.27	28.27	30.04	2.65	3.83	3.03	4.78	-	1.77
5 August 2023		Beginning of legal ban on publishing polls and electoral forecasts for the PASO primary elections									
31 July–4 August 2023	Atlas Intel	9,517	30.8	31.9	20.8	4.4	3.4	2.9	2.4	3.5	1.1
31 July–3 August 2023	Federico González & Asociados	2,400	30.1	36.4	19.5	3.2	2.5	5	3.1	-	6.3
25 July–2 August 2023	Opina Argentina	1,404	31	32	20	3	4	2	3	5	1
1 August 2023	Opinión Pública Servicios y Mercados	1,200	29.9	35.6	17.5	2.8	5.4	1.6	-	5	5.7
24–31 July 2023	Giacobbe & Asociados	2,500	32.2	38	18.8	2.6	2.6	1.9	3.9	-	5.8
24–31 July 2023	Proyección Consultores	2,130	31.1	34.3	19.1	2.4	2.2	3.7	7.2	-	3.2
25–29 July 2023	CB Consultora	1,985	30.4	33	20.3	4.9	1.5	3.9	2.5	3.5	2.6
24–29 July 2023	CIGP	1,602	31.2	36.5	13.8	-	2.8	5.2	4.1	6.4	5.3
22–29 July 2023	Hugo Haime Consultora	-	32.1	32.5	22	4.3	2.4	0.2	3.6	2.2	0.4
22–29 July 2023	Hugo Haime Consultora	-	32.8	28.1	23.3	4.2	3.3	-	5.7	2.3	4.7
22–29 July 2023	Hugo Haime Consultora	-	32.3	27.8	24.4	5.4	2.5	-	5.7	1.5	5.5
25–27 July 2023	Circuitos	2,180	30.1	34.8	16.7	1.9	3.7	4	-	8.8	4.7
12–27 July 2023	Management & Fit	1,800	31.7	34.7	17	6.6	4.4	1.2	0.7	2.9	3
23 July 2023	CEOP	1,167	28.5	30.3	19.1	0.8	1.6	0.5	3.3	12.1	1.8
20–25 July 2023	Políticos en Redes	2,237	25.2	31.2	23	1.8	2.5	3.2	3.3	9.8	6
17–21 July 2023	Federico González & Asociados	2,400	28	34.2	17.7	3.2	2.4	4.2	1.9	8.4	6.2
14–21 July 2023	Nueva Comunicación	1,780	28	29	19	3	4	1	6	10	1
12–21 July 2023	UdeSA	1,003	20.7	23.7	15.9	6	4.4	-	5.8	23.5	3
12–21 July 2023	UdeSA	1,003	20.6	18.5	18.5	6	4.4	-	5.7	26.1	2.1
12–21 July 2023	UdeSA	1,003	19	23	12	3	4	3	5	33	4
15–19 July 2023	Atlas Intel	4,848	33.8	33.8	20.1	3.4	2.6	1	0.9	3	-
15–19 July 2023	Atlas Intel	4,848	32.4	29	23.4	4.2	4.3	-	2.6	3.5	3.4
15–19 July 2023	Atlas Intel	4,848	31.9	23.5	25.2	4.1	4.1	-	3.4	4.2	6.7
5–18 July 2023	Opinaia	2,000	22	30	22	4	4	6	5	7	8
8–12 July 2023	UNLaM	2,510	31.4	33.9	18.1	2.0	1.3	1.1	4.1	8.1	2.6
7 July 2023	Patagonia	-	32.3	32.7	15.8	5.9	3.7	7.5	-	2.1	0.4
28 June–7 July 2023	Opina Argentina	1,404	29	30	22	3	4	1	3	7	1
6 July 2023	Federico González & Asociados	2,400	28.8	33.8	17.1	1.9	3.4	5.2	2.9	6.9	5
1–6 July 2023	Zuban Córdoba & Asociados	1,280	27.1	29.7	24.5	2.3	3.5	1.3	2.3	8.6	2.6
1–5 July 2023	Clivajes Consultores	1,570	30.5	33.9	18.4	2.6	3.4	4.1	7.1	-	3.4
June 2023	Fixer	-	27	35	18	3	2	-	1	12	8
2–5 June 2023	Consultora Tendencias	2,506	22.8	23.1	19.8	6.8	2.6	4.6	5.2	15.1	0.3
2–5 June 2023	Aresco	4,000	24.9	25.9	27.7	5.8	3	3.8	4.1	4.8	1.8
2–5 June 2023	Aresco	4,000	24.2	26.5	24.2	5.3	3.6	6.6	4.3	5.3	2.3
2–5 June 2023	Aresco	4,000	30.3	32.6	25.5	3.3	2.2	2.3	-	3.8	2.3
2–5 June 2023	Aresco	4,000	27.4	29.1	27.6	2.6	1.5	3.3	-	8.5	1.5
11–16 April 2023	Zuban Córdoba & Asociados	1,300	28.5	23.5	18	4.7	2.8	7.5		14.9	5
7–15 April 2023	Synopsis	1,679	23.7	26.6	26.5	3.6	3.8	4.5	-	11.3	0.1
7–15 April 2023	Synopsis	1,679	30	29.8	24.9	2.2	2.4	3.7	-	7.1	0.2
5–15 April 2023	Opina Argentina	1,402	27	27	23	5	3	4	-	7	-
27 February–13 April 2023	Management & Fit	1,500	26.5	27.6	24.3	6.8	4.5	3.2	7.2	3	1.1
27 February–13 April 2023	Management & Fit	1,500	28.7	27.4	23.9	6.3	3.8	3.2	6.6	3.1	1.3
27 February–13 April 2023	Management & Fit	1,500	30.7	26.5	23.7	6.8	3.9	3.2	5.8	2.7	4.2
27 February–13 April 2023	Management & Fit	1,500	21.9	22.2	14.3	6.8	4.9	3.2	-	27	0.3
3–9 April 2023	Inteligencia Analitica	9,754	18.7	23.6	20.8	-	5.3	-	-	31.6	2.8
2–4 April 2023	GOP y Trespuntozero	2,000	27.7	36	19.3	1.2	-	-	5.7	10.1	8.3
2–4 April 2023	GOP y Trespuntozero	2,000	30	36.6	19.1	1.1	-	-	2.8	10.4	6.6
28–31 March 2023	Analogías	2,658	25.2	24.5	20.7	-	3.5	-	5	21.1	0.7
22–30 March 2023	UdeSA	1,001	15	23	11	4	5	6	4	23	8
27–29 March 2023	Federico González & Asociados	1,800	25.2	31.5	15.2	3.3	4.6	4.8	5.3	10.1	6.3
March 2023	Poliarquia	-	27	25	23	5	-	2	-	18	2
March 2023	Poliarquia	-	35	33	23	3	3	-	-	-	2
14–23 March 2023	Opinaia	2,000	20	29	20	3	4	-	5	19	9
13–18 March 2023	Consultora Tendencias	8,206	27,5	30.6	18.5	6.2	2.4	0.4	4.5	9.9	3.1
8–16 March 2023	Synopsis	1,643	23.4	27.4	14.6	5.3	9.2	-	-	-	4
6–13 March 2023	Clivajes Consultores	1,395	26.7	20.8	28.4	-	-	-	-	24.1	1.7
14–28 Feb 2023	Management & Fit	2,200	23.6	25.7	20.4	-	-	14.3	-	16	2.1
18–27 Feb 2023	Opina Argentina	1,250	27	27	24	4	5	-	5	8	-
18–27 Feb 2023	Opina Argentina	1,250	28	32	22	4	3	1	2	7	4
12–17 Feb 2023	IPD	1,004	27	31	18	5	7	-	-	9	4
10–16 Feb 2023	Solmoirago	2,200	29.9	40.6	18	2.7	-	-	-	8.7	10.7
10–16 Feb 2023	Solmoirago	2,200	26.6	29.9	14.2	2,5	-	-	-	27	3.3
6–10 Feb 2023	CIGP	2,408	25.6	30.8	10.8	-	-	5.4	12.7	9.6	5.2
5–7 Feb 2023	Opinaia	1,100	24	27	24	3	4	-	-	18	3
2–5 Feb 2023	Opina Argentina	1,100	26	33	19	3	-	5	4	11	7
23 Jan–3 Feb 2023	Opinaia	2,000	24	31	24	2	3	-	-	16	7
16–22 Jan 2023	Zuban Córdoba & Asociados	1,300	30.3	23	23.2	-	4.8	7.9	-	10.8	7.1
19 Jan 2023	Aresco	4,000	25.4	28.6	22.3	4	5.2	4.3	3.7	6.5	3.2
19 Jan 2023	Aresco	4,000	29.8	29.5	18.8	2.8	5.3	5.8	3.5	4.5	0.3
11–17 Jan 2023	Solmoraigo	2,200	29.1	37.3	19.5	1.8	-	-	-	12.3	8.2
11–17 Jan 2023	Solmoraigo	2,200	29.3	41.1	18.1	2.8	-	-	-	8.7	11.8
26 Dec 2022–3 Jan 2023	Raúl Aragón & Asociados	1,500	24.8	29.1	18.3	3.7	-	7.3	8.1	8.7	4.3
26 Dec 2022–3 Jan 2023	Raúl Aragón & Asociados	1,500	23.5	34.3	17.2	3.3	-	7.8	6.8	7.1	10.8

==== 2021–2022 ====
Fieldwork date	Polling firm	Sample	FdT	JxC		FIT-U	Others	No one	Undecided	Lead
Dec 2022	Opina Argentina	1,100	25	34	19	4	5	5	8	9
26–28 Dec 2022	GOP y Trespuntozero	1,300	30	36.1	17.6	1.3	–	6.3	8.7	6.1
12–24 Nov 2022	Opinaia	2,000	24	31	23	3	6	–	13	7
13–21 Dec 2022	Management & Fit	2,200	24.7	29.1	24	–	5.4	–	16.8	4.4
11–17 Dec 2022	Solmoirago	2,200	28.4	32.9	19.7	1.2	–	–	17.8	4.5
11–17 Dec 2022	Solmoirago	2,200	29.6	33.3	21.5	1.1	–	–	14.5	3.7
11–17 Dec 2022	Solmoirago	2,200	27.4	38.6	18.9	1.2	–	–	13.9	11.2
13–16 Dec 2022	IPD	1,015	25	36	22	5	–	3	9	11
13–16 Dec 2022	IPD	1,015	33	35	20	4	–	2	6	2
14–17 Nov 2022	IPD	1,030	33	35	18	4	4	2	4	2
10–16 Nov 2022	Solmoraigo	1,800	23.5	34	14.8	1.4	6.6	–	19.7	10.5
8–10 Nov 2022	Opina Argentina	1,100	29	36	16	4	6	3	6	7
31 Oct – 3 Nov 2022	Management & Fit	2,200	25	30.2	21.5	3.8	7.8	4	7.7	5.2
20–29 Oct 2022	Opinaia	2,000	24	30	23	2	5	–	16	6
24–28 Oct 2022	PGD Consultores	2,400	25	35	18	–	9	–	13	10
17–21 Oct 2022	CIGP Consultora	2,400	23.2	29.7	15	–	8.8	9.7	13.5	6.5
13–19 Oct 2022	Solmoirago	1,800	22.8	33.4	16.3	2.3	4.2	–	21	10.6
9–16 Oct 2022	Ricardo Rouvier & Asociados	1,200	26.9	38	14	4.7	1.9	6.2	8.3	11.1
10–14 Oct 2022	Reale Dalla Torre	1,250	29.1	37.6	22	2.7	0.1	–	8.5	8.5
10–14 Oct 2022	IPD	1,043	29	34	19	5	3	3	7	5
6–10 Oct 2022	Giacobbe & Asociados	2,500	15.5	32.8	23.6	2.1	4.6	–	21.4	9.2
Sep 2022	Aresco	1,200	32.2	35	19.1	–	9	1	3.7	2.8
5–28 Sep 2022	Management & Fit	1,800	27	32.9	8.9	5.8	11.3	–	9.3	5.9
22–26 Sep 2022	Fixer	1,446	25	45	17	2	–	–	11	20
12–22 Sep 2022	Opinaia	2,000	28	28	23	3	4	–	14	Tie
12–19 Sep 2022	IPD	1,028	25	31	19	4	10	3	8	6
15–17 Sep 2022	Federico González & Asociados	800	24.3	32.4	17.4	3.5	3.3	4.7	10.8	8.1
13–17 Sep 2022	PGD Consultores	1,600	26	33	16	–	10	–	15	7
12–15 Sep 2022	Opina Argentina	1,000	25	32	18	3	6	4	12	7
4–14 Sep 2022	Ricardo Rouvier & Asociados	1,200	29.6	32.4	20.1	4.6	2.4	5.2	5.7	2.8
5–7 Sep 2022	Zuban Córdoba & Asociados	1,200	25.9	33.5	24.6	2.5	–	–	13.5	7.6
2–3 Sep 2022	GOP y Trespuntozero	1,650	30.5	39.1	21.8	0.9	–	2.9	4.8	8.6
13–24 Aug 2022	Opinaia	2,000	28	30	20	2	6	–	14	2
11–22 Aug 2022	Escenarios	2,224	19	36.3	13.4	1.3	–	6.8	23.3	17.3
12–15 Aug 2022	Synopsis	1,388	24.4	36.4	19.4	4.9	5	–	9.9	12
5–13 Aug 2022	Ricardo Rouvier & Asociados	1,200	27.9	32.9	23.1	3.5	2.5	5.5	4.6	5
4–10 Aug 2022	PGD Consultores	1,500	27	35	18	5	2	–	13	8
27–30 Jul 2022	Giacobbe & Asociados	3,000	17.8	34.9	20.2	–	17.7	–	6.4	14.3
22–28 Jul 2022	CB Consultora	3,075	24.1	34.5	14.5	–	4.7	6.9	15.3	10.4
23–26 Jul 2022	Zuban Córdoba & Asociados	1,300	28.7	34.6	21	4.3	3.1	–	8.3	5.9
11–26 Jul 2022	Opinaia	2,400	27	30	18	3	6	–	16	3
18–22 Jul 2022	CIGP Consultora	1,860	21	29.3	13.6	3	13.39	7.6	12	8.3
11–18 Jul 2022	Solmoirago	1,800	26	41.1	15.7	1.4	–	–	15.8	15.1
6–12 Jul 2022	Reale Dalla Torre	1,185	31.3	40.3	18.7	5.1	1.3	–	3.3	9
5–12 Jul 2022	Ricardo Rouvier & Asociados	1,200	28.6	32.1	22.8	3	3.1	5.6	4.8	3.5
8–11 Jul 2022	Synopsis	1,330	21.2	38.5	18.2	4.4	6.6	–	11.1	17.3
Jun 2022	Opina Argentina	1,000	26	34	18	5	4	3	11	8
27–29 Jun 2022	Zuban Córdoba & Asociados	1,600	28.6	34.7	16.4	3.8	5.6	–	10.6	6.1
13–28 Jun 2022	Opinaia	2,400	26	32	19	3	6	–	14	6
18–23 Jun 2022	Analogías	1,200	31.6	41.4	11.6	3.6	5	2.1	4.6	9.8
14–22 Jun 2022	CB Consultora	2,959	27.9	34.9	16.6	2	–	5.7	12.8	7
13–20 Jun 2022	Fixer	–	31	45	13	1	–	6	4	11
9–13 Jun 2022	Synopsis	1,569	22.4	36	17.6	4.8	8.8	–	10.4	13.6
9–12 Jun 2022	Raúl Aragón & Asociados	–	31.4	44.4	13.1	1.3	5.6	1.4	2.8	11
6–10 Jun 2022	CIGP Consultora	1,800	19.7	29.7	14.3	3	5	9.7	18.7	10
27 May – 1 Jun 2022	PGD Consultores	2,500	28	33	19	4	–	–	16	5
23–31 May 2022	Zuban Córdoba & Asociados	2000	27.8	30.6	20.2	2	–	–	16.8	2.8
23–30 May 2022	Fixer	1,162	30	39	18	2	–	–	11	9
13–26 May 2022	Opinaia	2,400	26	28	23	3	4	–	16	2
10–24 May 2022	Management & Fit	1,340	32.7	33.2	15.4	7.1	0.7	–	10.9	0.5
19–21 May 2022	Opina Argentina	1,200	29	32	18	2	7	2	11	3
13–16 May 2022	Raúl Aragón & Asociados	–	29.2	44.8	18.3	0.3	2.4	1.6	1.3	15.6
6–8 May 2022	Synopsis	1,467	23.4	34.6	19.1	5.1	5.5	–	12.3	11.2
2–6 May 2022	GOP y Trespuntozero	1,800	34.1	29.6	20.3	0.6	–	7.1	8.3	4.5
2–6 May 2022	GOP y Trespuntozero	1,800	34.9	30.3	19.9	0.3	–	7.1	7.5	4.6
Apr 2022	Aresco	2,490	31.8	34.6	20.7	3.9	3.2	2.3	3.5	2.8
25–27 Apr 2022	Zuban Córdoba & Asociados	2,000	23.9	28.2	20.6	–	11.5	–	15.8	4.3
19–27 Apr 2022	Management & Fit	2,200	27.3	26.6	22.8	3.1	7	5	8.1	0.7
11–18 Apr 2022	Solmoirago	1,300	24	31.6	12.5	–	–	–	23	7.6
10–15 Apr 2022	Raúl Aragón & Asociados	1,500	34.1	38.1	18.8	2.2	6.2	6.6	8.8	4
11–14 Apr 2022	Opina Argentina	1,000	24	32	21	6	3	3	11	8
1–4 Apr 2022	Synopsis	1,000	23.4	33.8	18.4	3.3	6.3	–	14.8	10.4
31 Mar – 2 Apr 2022	Circuitos	1,382	29.3	32.3	18.3	3.7	–	16.4	–	3
22–29 Mar 2022	Fixer	2,112	33	41	15	3	–	6	4	8
14–22 Mar 2022	Opinaia	2,400	31	30	20	3	3	–	13	1
11–14 Mar 2022	Zuban Córdoba	1,300	28.7	37	18.5	1.1	5.8	3.3	9.9	8.3
6–8 Mar 2022	Opina Argentina	1,000	26	30	18	4	8	3	12	4
18–25 Feb 2022	CB Consultora	2,080	22.3	29.2	9.5	2.7	6.1	11.3	18.9	6.9
1–4 Feb 2022	GOP y Trespuntozero	1,900	33.1	34.3	14.6	1.1	–	9.7	7.2	1.2
24–29 Jan 2022	Solmoraigo	2,050	28.2	34.3	11.1	2.3	5.7	–	18.4	6.1
10–28 Jan 2022	Opinaia	2,400	32	32	17	4	3	–	12	Tie
3–5 Jan 2022	Opina Argentina	1,200	29	34	15	2	6	2	13	5
1–5 Jan 2022	Trespuntozero	1800	31.6	21.4	9.5	1.3	1.1	30.8	4.3	10.2
17–21 Dec 2021	Opinaia	2,400	34	34	16	4	3	7	9	Tie
17–20 Dec 2021	CB Consultora	1,511	25.6	34.8	8.9	3.4	–	7.9	19.4	9.2
15–17 Nov 2021	CB Consultora	1,575	28.9	40.7	7.2	3.8	3.2	–	16.2	11.8
14 Nov 2021	2021 legislative election	24,406,798	34.56	42.75	7.32	5.41	5.65	11.45	–	8.19

=== By candidate ===
==== After primary elections ====
Fieldwork date	Polling firm	Sample						No one	Undecided	Margin
Fieldwork date	Polling firm	Sample	Massa UP	Bullrich JxC	Milei LLA	Schiaretti HNP	Bregman FIT–U	No one	Undecided	Margin
16 - 18 August 2023	DC Consultores	2,100	23.1	24.7	34	–	–	2.4	15.8	9.3
16 - 17 August 2023	OPSA	4,623	32.3	23.7	38.5	3.2	2.3	–	–	6.2
14 - 16 August 2023	CB Consultora	4,340	28.1	25.3	32.3	3.8	1.8	3.2	5.4	4.2

==== After candidates definition ====
Fieldwork date	Polling firm	Sample	UP		JxC		LLA	FIT–U		HNP	PyV	Others	No one	Undecided
Fieldwork date	Polling firm	Sample	Sergio Massa (FR)	Juan Grabois (FPG)	Patricia Bullrich (PRO)	Horacio R. Larreta (PRO)	Javier Milei (PL)	Myriam Bregman (PTS)	Gabriel Solano (PO)	Juan Schiaretti (PJ–HPC)	Guillermo Moreno (PyV)	Others	No one	Undecided
13 August 2023	Primary elections	-	21.40	5.87	16.98	11.30	30.04	1.87	0.89	3.83	0.77			-
5 August 2023		Beginning of legal ban on publishing polls and electoral forecasts for the PASO primary elections												
31 July - 4 August 2023	Atlas Intel	9,517	24,1	6,7	19,2	12,7	20,8	2,9	0,6	4,4	-	2,9	2,4	3,5
31 July - 3 August 2023	Federico González & Asociados	2,400	28.3	6,3	20,1	16,3	19,5	1,7	0,8	3,2	1,5	3,5	3,1	-
25 July - 2 August 2023	Opina Argentina	-	28	3	16	16	20	3	1	3	1	1	3	5
1 August 2023	Opinión Pública Servicios y Mercados	1,200	23,7	6,2	24.3	11,3	17,5	4,7	0,7	2,8	-	1,6	-	5
12 - 27 July 2023	Management & Fit	1,800	26.4	6.3	19	17	17.7	4.5	-	-	0.5	-	-	-
22 - 23 July 2023	CEOP	1,167	27	6.3	16.4	19.1	22.4	1.3	0.6	0.9	1.5	-	-	-
17 - 21 July 2023	Federico González & Asociados	2,400	25	5.6	14.5	23	19.3	1.7	0.9	3.5	1.1	-	-	-
15 - 19 July 2023	Atlas Intel	4,848	27.2	8.2	12.1	23.2	21	2.3	0.5	3.6	-	-	-	-
5 - 18 July 2023	Opinaia	2,000	20.4	3.2	12.9	19.4	24	3.2	1.1	4.3	-	-	-	-
8 - 12 July 2023	University of La Matanza	2,510	29.3	4.9	14.5	22.4	19.7	1.2	1	1.4	1	-	-	-
4 - 11 July 2023	Tacquion	2,419	20.1	9.3	10.3	24.1	21	2.7	0.6	3.4	1.6	-	-	-
28 June - 7 July 2023	Opina Argentina	1.404	26	3	15	15	22	3	1	3	1	1	3	7
6 July 2023	Federico González & Asociados	2.400	27,5	1,3	21,1	12,3	17,1	2,4	0,9	1,9	1,5	2,5	2,9	6,9
1 - 6 July 2023	Zuban Córdoba & Asociados	1.280	25,1	2,0	13,3	16,4	24,5	2,1	0,2	3,5	0,6	0,7	2,3	8,6
1 - 5 July 2023	Clivajes Consultores	1.570	21,8	8,7	17,4	16,5	18,4	2,3	1,1	2,6	1,7	1,5	7,1	-
27 June - 2 July 2023	Giacobbe & Asociados	2.500	28,2	-	-	19,8	28,3	2,5	-	1,9	-	-	8,1	9,9
27 June - 2 July 2023	Giacobbe & Asociados	2.500	18,9	9,6	25,7	7,5	22,3	0,9	0,1	1,0	1,6	0,7	2,0	9,3
28 - 30 June 2023	Analogías	2.569	28,6	4	21,1	11,6	17,8	1,2	-	2,1	-	-	-	12,7
27 - 30 June 2023	Observatorio Electoral Consultores	1.680	23	5	26	14	15	2	-	2	3	2	-	8
26 - 29 June 2023	Opinaia	1.300	19	5	18	14	19	2	1	3	-	5	4	10
28 June 2023	Proyección Consultores	-	30,3	2,5	20,6	14,1	18,8	1,7	-	0,9	-	1,4	3,1	6,6
26 - 28 June 2023	Inteligencia Analítica	5.285	29,5	-	-	28,1	25,8	2,5	-	3,2	-	3,9	3,0	4,0
26 - 28 June 2023	Inteligencia Analítica	5.285	28,5	-	32,2	-	22,1	3,2	-	3,6	-	3,9	2,0	4,2
26 - 28 June 2023	Inteligencia Analítica	5.285	23,1	6,7	24,8	9,5	19,6	2,2	-	2,5	-	3,4	3,0	5,2
25 - 27 June 2023	CB Consultora	2.856	24,1	5	17,3	16,5	17,2	1,5	0,1	3,3	2,3	1,3	4,9	6,5

==== Before candidates definition ====
Fieldwork date	Polling firm	Sample	Unión por la Patria					Juntos por el Cambio							LLA+AL		FIT–U	PF	Others	No one	Undecided
Fieldwork date	Polling firm	Sample	Alberto Fernández (PJ)	Cristina F. Kirchner (PJ)	Daniel Scioli (PJ)	Axel Kicillof (PJ)	Sergio Massa (FR)	Horacio R. Larreta (PRO)	Mauricio Macri (PRO)	Patricia Bullrich (PRO)	María Eugenia Vidal (PRO)	Facundo Manes (UCR)	Martín Lousteau (UCR)	Gerardo Morales (UCR)	Javier Milei (PL)	José Luis Espert (IND)	Nicolás del Caño (PTS)	Juan Schiaretti (PJ)	Others	No one	Undecided
21 Apr 2023	Alberto Fernández announces his decision to not seek reelection to the presidency.																				
5-15 Apr 2023	Opina Argentina	1,402	–	–	–	10	16	18	–	11	–	–	–	–	24	–	–	4	10	3	5
14–17 Nov 2022	IPD	1,030	–	29	–	–	–	–	–	30	–	–	–	–	26	–	–	–	6	3	6
14–17 Nov 2022	IPD	1,030	–	–	–	–	31	–	–	27	–	–	–	–	30	–	–	–	4	4	4
14–17 Nov 2022	IPD	1,030	–	–	–	–	28	29	–	–	–	–	–	–	26	–	–	–	6	3	8
14–17 Nov 2022	IPD	1,030	–	29	–	–	–	29	–	–	–	–	–	–	25	–	–	–	6	4	7
10–16 Nov 2022	Solmoraigo	1,800	–	19.8	–	–	5.7	15.2	–	14.1	–	4.3	–	–	17.9	–	–	–	1.5	–	21.5
10–16 Nov 2022	Solmoraigo	1,800	4.8	16.7	–	2.1	4	11.8	11.2	10.4	–	2.5	–	2.9	15.6	2	–	–	0.9	–	15.1
8–10 Nov 2022	Opina Argentina	1,100	6	19	–	–	5	13	11	8	–	3	–	4	17	–	3	–	–	3	8
29 Oct 2022	Martín Lousteau announces his candidacy for head of government of CABA.																				
20–29 Oct 2022	Opinaia	2,000	4	13	–	3	3	5	9	9	3	3	–	1	22	1	2	3	3	–	16
18 Oct 2022	José Luis Espert announces his candidacy for governor of the Buenos Aires Province.																				
9–16 Oct 2022	Ricardo Rouvier & Asociados	1,200	–	27	–	–	–	31.8	–	–	–	–	–	–	16.2	–	–	–	4.8	12.1	8.1
9–16 Oct 2022	Ricardo Rouvier & Asociados	1,200	–	–	–	–	22.7	33	–	–	–	–	–	–	12.7	–	–	–	5.1	14.4	12.1
10–14 Oct 2022	Reale Dalla Torre	1,250	4.4	19.3	–	–	5.4	11.7	7.9	10.8	–	5.6	–	1.6	22	–	2.7	–	0.1	–	8.5
10–14 Oct 2022	IPD	1,043	–	–	–	–	25	–	25	–	–	–	–	–	31	–	7	–	–	4	8
10–14 Oct 2022	IPD	1,043	–	28	–	–	–	–	25	–	–	–	–	–	30	–	7	–	–	5	5
10–14 Oct 2022	IPD	1,043	–	28	–	–	–	–	–	29	–	–	–	–	27	–	6	–	–	3	8
10–14 Oct 2022	IPD	1,043	–	–	–	–	24	–	–	27	–	–	–	–	30	–	7	–	–	4	8
10–14 Oct 2022	IPD	1,043	–	–	–	–	25	27	–	–	–	–	–	–	28	–	7	–	–	3	10
10–14 Oct 2022	IPD	1,043	–	27	–	–	–	29	–	–	–	–	–	–	29	–	6	–	–	4	5
12–19 Sep 2022	IPD	1,028	5	17	1	3	9	13	5	10	–	5	–	–	17	2	2	–	–	2	3
12–22 Sep 2022	Opinaia	2,000	5	14	1	3	4	6	7	7	4	2	–	1	21	2	2	2	4	–	14
15–17 Sep 2022	Federico González & Asociados	800	4	16.5	–	–	8.2	11.3	9.3	10.8	–	4.5	–	–	15.8	–	3.5	–	3	4.6	8.5
4–14 Sep 2022	Ricardo Rouvier & Asociados	1,200	–	–	–	–	21.6	30.8	–	–	–	–	–	–	18.6	–	–	–	5.1	9.2	14.7
2–3 Sep 2022	GOP y Trespuntozero	1,650	4.9	21.8	0.5	–	3.1	6.8	13.7	14.7	–	2.4	–	0.5	20	1.8	0.9	–	–	2.9	4.8
1 Sep 2022	Attempted assassination of Cristina Fernández de Kirchner																				
13–24 Aug 2022	Opinaia	2,000	6	13	1	2	5	6	8	8	3	4	–	1	18	2	1	2	6	–	14
5–13 Aug 2022	Ricardo Rouvier & Asociados	1,200	–	–	–	–	18.7	31	–	–	–	–	–	–	20.9	–	–	–	4.6	11.7	13.1
27–30 Jul 2022	Giacobbe & Asociados	3,000	2.7	15.1	–	–	–	3.4	14.2	15.1	–	2.2	–	–	20.2	–	–	–	17.7	–	6.4
22–28 Jul 2022	CB Consultora	3,075	5.4	11.7	–	–	7	11.1	8.3	8.9	–	3.7	–	2.5	14.5	–	–	–	4.7	6.9	15.3
6–12 Jul 2022	Real Dalla Torre	1,185	5.2	20.4	1.3	–	3.4	11.4	8.5	6.9	4	3.1	–	1	18	2.3	3.1	–	1	–	10.4
13–28 Jun 2022	Opinaia	2,400	6	14	–	2	2	8	8	6	4	4	–	2	17	2	2	2	5	–	14
18–23 Jun 2022	Analogías	1,200	13.1	15.9	–	–	2.6	18.5	–	13.8	–	9.1	–	–	9.5	2.1	3.6	–	5	2.1	4.6
14–22 Jun 2022	CB Consultora	2,959	6.1	13.2	3.9	–	4.7	15.5	–	11.2	–	6.1	–	–	16.6	–	2	–	–	2.1	12.8
9–12 Jun 2022	Raúl Aragón & Asociados	1,803	10.8	20.6	–	–	–	22.9	10.2	7.4	–	–	–	3.9	13.1	–	1.3	–	5.6	1.4	2.8
10 Jun 2022	Javier Milei launches his candidacy for president.																				
7 Jun 2022	Patricia Bullrich launches her candidacy for president.																				
13–26 May 2022	Opinaia	2,400	7	13	–	2	2	6	8	5	4	2	2	1	21	2	2	2	5	–	16
10–24 May 2022	Management & Fit	1,340	5.7	17.9	–	4.7	3.6	19.3	3.6	2.8	3.7	1.7	0.9	0.1	15.6	–	–	–	6.5	–	13.9
13–16 May 2022	Raúl Aragón & Asociados	1,800	9.1	20.1	–	–	–	24.3	10.9	7.2	–	–	–	4.4	18.3	–	0.3	–	2.4	1.6	1.3
2–6 May 2022	GOP y Trespuntozero	1,800	9.7	19.7	1.5	–	2.5	9.4	–	14.6	–	3.4	–	0.9	17.6	2.7	0.6	–	2	7.1	8.3
2–6 May 2022	GOP y Trespuntozero	1,800	10.7	19.9	1.4	–	2.5	7	9.8	8.5	–	3.3	–	0.7	17.9	2	0.3	–	1.4	7.1	7.5
Apr 2022	Arasco	2,490	11.9	19.9	–	–	–	16.5	–	12.3	–	5.8	–	–	20.7	–	3.9	–	3.2	2.3	3.5
10–15 Apr 2022	Raúl Aragón & Asociados	1,500	7	20	–	–	7.1	18.4	14	–	–	–	–	5.7	15.6	3.2	–	–	4.9	1.7	2.4
11 Apr 2022	Javier Milei announces that he will be a candidate for president of the nation.																				
31 Mar – 2 Apr 2022	Circuitos	1,382	5.7	20.4	–	–	3.2	12.9	15.8	–	–	–	–	3.6	18.3	–	3.7	–	–	16.4	–
14–22 Mar 2022	Opinaia	2,400	8	15	–	2	3	9	7	5	5	–	3	1	18	2	3	3	3	–	13
1–4 Feb 2022	GOP y Trespuntozero	1,900	13.7	17.5	–	–	–	6.9	10.2	13	–	2.6	0.8	0.8	14.6	–	1.1	–	1.9	9.7	7.2
10–28 Jan 2022	Opinaia	2,400	11	13	–	5	3	9	9	5	6	–	2	1	14	3	4	3	–	–	12
1–5 Jan 2022	GOP y Trespuntozero	1,800	8.8	16.2	–	–	–	13	10.6	18.3	–	1.9	2.3	2	10.5	–	1.3	–	1.5	10.1	3.5
17–21 Dec 2021	Opinaia	2,400	12	14	–	5	3	12	13	–	–	5	4	–	12	4	4	3	–	–	9
17–20 Dec 2021	CB Consultora	1,511	9	18.8	–	–	–	18.4	–	14.1	–	–	–	6.1	9.4	2.8	3.1	–	–	–	18.3
15–17 Dec 2021	CB Consultora	1,575	3.5	16.2	–	1.1	3.9	17.6	10.7	6.2	–	7.3	–	3.4	13.7	5.5	–	–	2.7	–	16.2
26 Jul – 2 Aug 2021	Real Time Data	2,200	10	7	–	13	3	12	7	6	3	2	–	–	–	2	–	–	18	–	17
6–10 Jan 2021	Real Time Data	1,050	16	7	–	5	2	10	5	–	3	–	–	–	–	3	–	–	23	–	23

==== Hypothetical scenarios ====
Fieldwork date	Polling firm	Sample	Independent	Everyone's Front					Juntos por el Cambio							LLA+AL		FIT–U	PF	Others	No one	Undecided
Fieldwork date	Polling firm	Sample	Messi	Fernández	Kirchner	Scioli	Kicillof	Massa	Larreta	Macri	Bullrich	Vidal	Manes	Lousteau	Morales	Milei	Espert	Del Caño	Schiaretti	Others	No one	Undecided
19–20 Dec 2022	Giacobbe & Asociados	2,500	36.7	1.3	11.3	–	–	1.4	2.9	6.9	8.8	–	1.8	–	–	12.0	–	0.8	–	–	5.9	10.0

== Second round ==
Local regression trend line of survey results for the second round.

A presidential candidate wins the second round by winning a simple majority of votes.

=== After the primaries ===
Fieldwork date	Polling firm	Sample	Margin of Error	UP	LLA	JxC	Undecided	Void or blank	Margin
Fieldwork date	Polling firm	Sample	Margin of Error	Sergio Massa	Javier Milei	Patricia Bullrich	Undecided	Void or blank	Margin
19 November 2023	General elections	-	-	44.3%	55.7%	-	-	3.13%	11.4%
5–9 November 2023	AtlasIntel	8,971	1.0%	44.6%	48.6%	―	2.3%	4.4%	4.0%
25 October–8 November 2023	CELAG	2,005		50.8%	49.2%	―	―		1.6%
1–6 November 2023	CB Consultora	2,471	2.0%	43.1%	46.3%	―	5.7%	4.9%	3.2%
1–6 November 2023	Proyección Consultores	3,879		49%	51%	―	―	―	2%
1–3 November 2023	AtlasIntel	3,218		48%	52%	―	―	―	4%
1–3 November 2023	CIGP	1,798		49%	51%	―	―	―	2%
1–3 November 2023	Analogias	2,324	2.4%	42.4%	39.7%	―	18%	―	2.7%
1–3 November 2023	Atlas Intel	3,218		44.7%	48.5%	―	2.5%	―	3.8%
28–29 October 2023	Zuban Cordoba	2,000		45.4%	43.1%	4.3% (?)	7.3%	―	2.3%
23–29 October 2023	Inteligencia Analitica	17,395		43.1%	43.3%	7.3% (?)	6.3%	―	0.2%
25 October 2023	Patricia Bullrich endorses Javier Milei for president.								
23–25 October 2023	Analogias	1,954	2.4%	45.5%	37.0%	17.5% (?)	―		8.5%
23–25 October 2023	Analogias	1,954	2.4%	42.4%	34.3%	17.5% (?)	5.8%	―	8.1%
23–24 October 2023	Proyección	1,459	2.63%	51.9%	39.8%	8.3% (?)	―		12.1%
23–24 October 2023	Proyección	1,459	2.63%	44.6%	34.2%	8.3% (?)	5.9%	7%	10.4%
23–24 October 2023	CB	1,750	2.4%	40.4%	41.6%	7.5% (?)	10.4%		1.2%
22 October 2023	Sergio Massa and Javier Milei advance to the second round on 19 November 2023.								
13–25 August 2023	Opinaia	2,000	2.2%	32%	―	44%	24%	―	12%
13–25 August 2023	Opinaia	2,000	2.2%	30%	49%	―	21%	―	19%
13–25 August 2023	Opinaia	2,000	2.2%	―	39%	31%	30%	―	8%
16–17 August 2023	UBA	4,623	1.5%	35%	―	51%	14%	―	16%
16–17 August 2023	UBA	4,623	1.5%	37%	51%	―	11%	―	14%
16–17 August 2023	UBA	4,623	1.5%	―	38%	32%	31%	―	6%

=== Before candidate selection ===
Fieldwork date	Polling firm	Sample	Everyone's Front				Juntos por el Cambio			Freedom Advances	No one	Undecided
Fieldwork date	Polling firm	Sample	Fernández	C. Kirchner	Scioli	Massa	Larreta	Bullrich	Macri	Milei	No one	Undecided
10–14 Oct 2022	Reale Dalla Torre	1,250	–	–	–	34.4	–	40	–	–	–	25.6
10–14 Oct 2022	Reale Dalla Torre	1,250	–	29.7	–	–	49	–	–	–	–	21.3
10–14 Oct 2022	Reale Dalla Torre	1,250	–	32	–	–	–	–	46.7	–	–	21.3
6–12 Jul 2022	Real Dalla Torre	1,185	–	–	29.6	–	46.2	–	–	–	–	24.2
6–12 Jul 2022	Real Dalla Torre	1,185	–	31.4	–	–	47	–	–	–	–	21.6
6–12 Jul 2022	Real Dalla Torre	1,185	–	32.7	–	–	–	–	45.5	–	–	21.8
5–12 Jul 2022	Ricardo Rouvier & Asociados	1,200	–	–	36.9	–	48.2	–	–	–	8.4	6.5
5–12 Jul 2022	Ricardo Rouvier & Asociados	1,200	–	37.4	–	–	–	–	42.8	–	12.7	7.1
5–12 Jul 2022	Ricardo Rouvier & Asociados	1,200	–	–	–	–	54.8	–	–	29.4	9.1	6.7
1–4 Feb 2022	GOP y Trespuntozero	1,900	31.6	–	–	–	34.2	–	–	–	24.2	10
1–4 Feb 2022	GOP y Trespuntozero	1,900	30.1	–	–	–	–	36.9	–	–	22	11
1–4 Feb 2022	GOP y Trespuntozero	1,900	–	31.8	–	–	37.1	–	–	–	21.4	9.7
1–4 Feb 2022	GOP y Trespuntozero	1,900	–	32.5	–	–	–	38.4	–	–	21.9	7.2
