= Gabriel Solano =

Argentinian politician

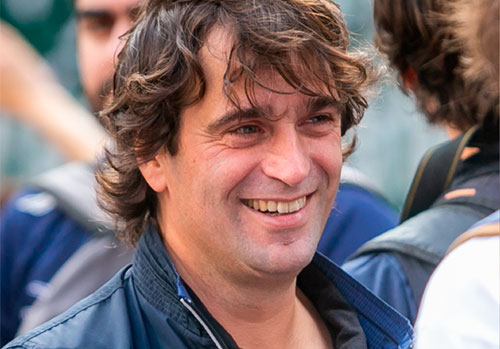
Gabriel Solano

Gabriel Esteban Solano (born 4 June 1974) is an Argentine Trotskyist political activist and president of the Workers' Party since 2019. He was elected to the Buenos Aires City Legislature in 2017 and leads the Workers' Left Front.

Solano unsuccessfully ran for president in 2023 with Vilma Ripoll as his vice presidential candidate.

== Biography ==
Solano started his political activism in 1992, opposing the government of Carlos Menem. Solano briefly joined the Socialist Party before leading Unión de Juventudes por el Socialismo (English: "Youth Union for Socialism").

He participated in the World Social Forum in 2002 and 2005 in Brazil and Venezuela, respectively.

He has written articles on education, economic policy, and youth as a columnist for La Política Online, Infobae, and Prensa Obrera.

As a legislator, he worked to address educational reform, particularly educational infrastructure. He wrote a bill that would codify the separation of church and state in Buenos Aires.

Solano promoted investigating the death of Santiago Maldonado, assigning responsibility to the government.

He criticized Mauricio Macri's Armed Forces reform policy, arguing the changes "hide a repressive plan." In 2018, he opposed a labor reform package that included an agreement with the International Monetary Fund, promoting a "labor movement" struggle over "labor reform."

Solano was defeated in the 2023 primary elections.
