= Marcelo Ramal =

Argentine economist and politician

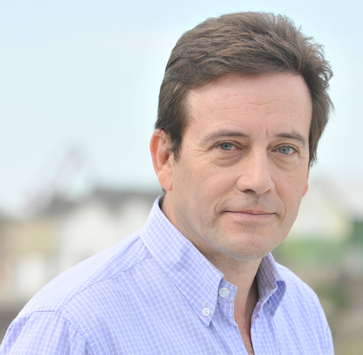
Marcelo Ramal

Marcelo Armando Ramal (born 13 October 1954) is an Argentine economist, university professor, and Trotskyist politician serving as provincial deputy of Buenos Aires. He was elected in October 2013 as a candidate of the Workers' Left Front and is a member of the Workers' Party (PO).

== Biography ==
Ramal began political activity at age 15, with ties to Peronism. He distanced himself from Peronism after the events of Cordobazo, but formed a bond with Catalina Guagnini, an Argentine Trotskyist activist, and opposed the 1976 dictatorship.

Between 2000 and 2003, he was Parliamentary Secretary of the Labor Party bloc in the Buenos Aires City Legislature. He worked with Jorge Altamira to increase the minimum wage and urbanize the city. In 2003, Ramal was beaten and detained while resisting the eviction of 24 families from the Children's Board (Pa.De.La.I.).

Ramal is an adjunct professor of industrial organization at the Faculty of Economic Sciences of the University of Buenos Aires. In 2008, he overcame an attempt to annul his position through a competitive exam after he was supported by students and faculty.

== Political career ==
In the 2013 elections, Ramal led the Workers' Left Front, which obtained 4.96 percent of the vote. He was sworn in on 3 December 2013, mentioning "the working class, Mariano Ferreyra and the kids of Cromañón." He led the coalition for the first two years until a scheduled leadership transfer.

On 20 November 2013, Ramal filed a criminal complaint against the Republican Proposal and the major opposition blocs in the legislature for alleged bribery and influence peddling.

During a 2013 heat wave, Ramal drafted a bill declaring an electricity emergency in Buenos Aires. The bill would create a committee that would work to restore power, and coordinate electrical companies' responses, and would be funded by a special tax on gambling houses, which were tax-exempt.

In 2015, he proposed two laws addressing violence against women, coinciding with the Ni Una Menos movement.

He unsuccessfully ran for president in the 2023 primary elections with Patricia Urones as his vice presidential running mate.
