= Eduardo Sartelli =

Argentine professor and politician (born 1963)

Eduardo Sartelli (born April 5, 1963, in Buenos Aires) is an Argentine professor and politician, Licentiate in History by the University of Buenos Aires, where he investigates and teaches contemporary Argentine history, as well as in La Plata National University.

Sartelli was a member of the Trotskyist Workers' Party and identifies as a revolutionary socialist. He has published numerous articles in specialized and divulgation magazines. He is the author of three books: La cajita infeliz, La plaza es nuestra, and Patrones en la ruta. Sartelli is also director at the Centro de Estudios e Investigaciones en Ciencias Sociales (CEICS), a founding member of the cultural organization Razón y Revolución (Reason and Revolution), and a member of the editorial committee of the magazine El Aromo.
