= Luis D'Elía =

Argentine politician

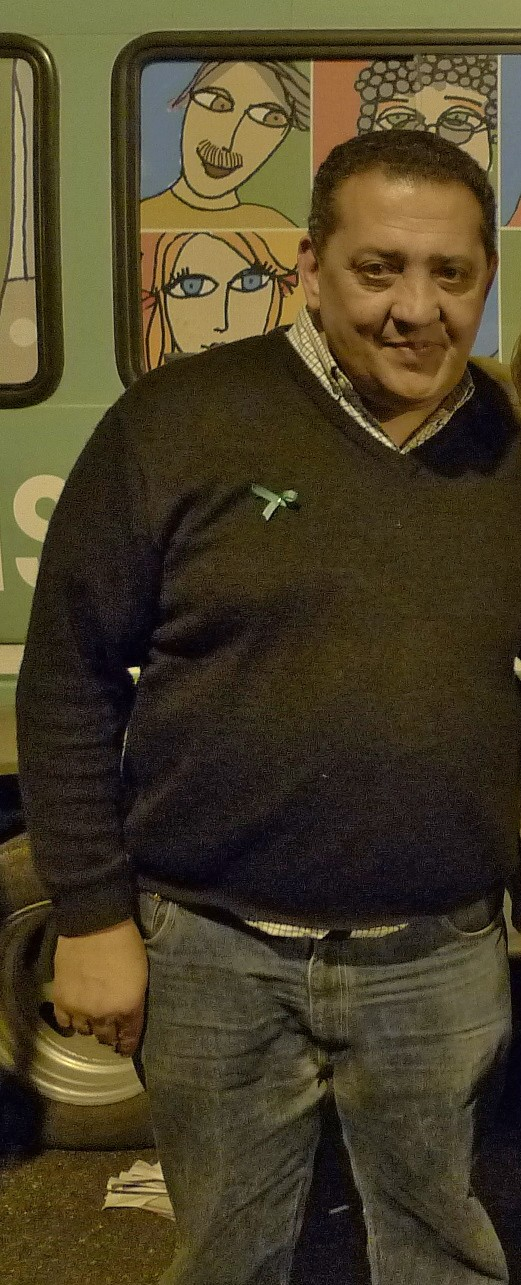
- Born: January 27, 1957 (age 69); Morón, Buenos Aires
- Occupation: Piquetero

Luis D'Elía is an Argentine activist and politician who served in the government of Néstor Kirchner. He is the founder and head of the Federation of Land, Housing and Habitat, which has been described as a "violent wing" of the Confederation of Argentine Workers.

A longtime leader of protests by union members and others on the Argentinian left, D'Elía is often referred to in the media by the epithet "the picketer" or "the picket leader". He has also been called an "ultra-Kirchnerist". He led a group that occupied a Buenos Aires police station in 1994, and his argument that the bombing that same year of a Jewish center in Buenos Aires was the work not of Iranian terrorists but of Jews. His friendly contacts with Mahmoud Ahmadinejad have caused him to be described as "the unofficial spokesman of the Iranian government in Argentina" and as a "hit man for Iran".

== Early life and education ==
Luis D'Elía was born on 27 January 1957 at the Clínica Modelo de Morón, Buenos Aires, into a family belonging to the working middle class. His father, Luis Omar D'Elía, was of Sicilian ancestry, worked for the national electricity firm SEGBA, and was a member of the power and light union. D'Elía's mother, Ofelia García Prieto, was a dressmaker specializing in bridal gowns and was the daughter of immigrants from the Spanish province of Galicia. Both of D'Elías parents had been fervent Peronists, attending "all the events" hosted by Juan and Eva Perón at the Plaza de Mayo and receiving their first house as part of the Plan Eva Perón. "I adored Evita", Ofelia later said. She later admired Scioli, Sergio Massa, and the Kirchners, and despised Menem, Rodríguez Saá, De la Sota, Schiaretti, and Duhalde. D'Elía's father died of lung cancer on 9 October 1990. In Spain, Ofelia's father had been a Republican, and her mother a socialist.

D'Elía grew up in the parish of Don Bosco in Villa Luzuriaga, a section of the Buenos Aires district of La Matanza, and had two siblings, Ariel and Mabel. The Church of Don Bosco was the family's "political cradle", and D'Elía's mentor, with whom he would remain close throughout his adult life, was the "progressive" Salesian priest Fr. Enrique Lapadula, who was an activist leader in La Matanza and believed in a "church of the poor". D'Elía assisted in masses at the church and played on a soccer team coached by his father. Interviewed in 2008 as "the mother of the most polemical of the picketers", D'Elía's mother recalled that when he was a child, he had been an "impeccable" student and she had expected him to become a priest; he was, she said, "naughty, like all intelligent boys". He had been strongly affected by the deaths of his father and of his brother-in-law, Daniel, the latter from an aneurysm. Asked whether she had ever told her son he was wrong about anything, she replied that she had done so on occasion, in anger, but unfairly, because "he is always right".

=== Education and teaching ===
In his youth, D'Elía became active in El Sindicato Unificado de Trabajadores de la Educación de Buenos Aires (SUTEBA), a teachers' union in Buenos Aires; in El Servicio de Paz y Justicia (Service of Peace and Justice), headed by Adolfo Pérez Esquivel; and, later, in the Christian Democratic Party, which was identified with the ideas of liberation theology.

On 16 March 1981, D'Elía started working as a teacher, beginning with a job as substitute teacher at School #50 in La Matanza. From then until February 28, 1988, he was employed as a substitute teacher in various schools, teaching "intermittently for 4 years, 8 months and 28 days" and serving most frequently at School #172, in Isidro Casanova. The last day he taught was February 28, 1988.

Meanwhile, D'Elía pursued studies for a degree as a secondary-school teacher at the Instituto de Profesorado Manuel Dorrego de Morón, from which he graduated in 1985. He combined his work and studies with activity in grassroots Christian militancy and the Christian Democratic Party. In 1985, for instance, D'Elía joined thousands of homeless people who occupied several acres of public land in El Tambo (in the neighborhood of Isidro Casanova in La Matanza), setting up hundreds of tents and calling on the government to build housing on the lands. The campaign went through a difficult period, with infighting, poor living conditions, and a food-supply crisis, and at one point D'Elía, feeling demoralized, left his tent and returned to his ranch with his wife. That night one of the other activist leaders, an Afro-Argentine mother of 12 children, came to his home, slapped him, and, calling him a "chickenshit asshole", told him, "you're the only one who can lead this". He returned to El Tambo, where the next day the Afro-Argentine woman reportedly died from a gunshot wound in a police crackdown. D'Elía organized the homeless people into a cooperative called Unidad, Solidaridad y Organización (Unity, Solidarity, and Organization). Despite clashes with police, he and his people ended up developing El Tambo into the new neighborhood of Isidro Casanova.

== Activist career ==
In April 1988, Antonio Salviolo, leader of the Christian Democrats and director of schools for the province of Buenos Aires under the presidency of Antonio Cafiero, appointed D'Elía as administrative undersecretary. Later that same year, the Senate of the province of Buenos Aires appointed him schools advisor, a title he held until 1992.

=== Judicialist Party and FREPASO ===
In 1992, D'Elía was appointed head teacher at School # 188 in La Matanza, but while retaining the title and collecting a salary, he never actually took up the position in practice. Instead he was active in the Justicialist Party, a Peronist group, and led more actions involving housing for the homeless. In 1995, Carlos Chacho Alvarez, leader of Frente por un País Solidario (FREPASO, or Front for a Country in Solidarity), a new party which had been formed in 1994, invited him to join its list of candidates for city councilors in La Matanza. In 1997, FREPASO prevailed in the elections in the Province of Buenos Aires, and in 1999 it was part of the coalition whose candidate, Fernando de la Rua, won the presidential election. Around this time, D'Elía began organizing unemployed and homeless people; he remained active in SUTEBA, the teachers' union, which upon the formation of the Central de los Trabajadores Argentinos (Confederation of Argentine Workers, or CTA), became a leading member of that federation.

=== Federation of Land, Housing and Habitat ===
After leaving FREPASO, D'Elía founded the Federación de Tierra, Vivienda y Hábitat (Federation of Land, Housing and Habitat, or FTV), a group for unemployed persons in Argentina, which in turn joined the CTA, under secretary general Victor De Gennaro. The FTV has been described as "a violent wing" of the CTA. In one of his first public activities, he was accused of trying to disrupt a protest by retired workers during the administration of Carlos Menem and of advocating violent support of Menem.

=== Extortion charges ===
It was reported in January 2001 that union members under the control of D'Elía compelled beneficiaries of state aid to hand part of it over to them on threat of losing the entire benefit. D'Elía, who was mentioned by several witnesses in a legal case about the extortion charges, admitted that recipients of the aid were asked to make "a social contribution."

== Kirchner government ==
When Néstor Kirchner became president of Argentina in 2003, he appointed D'Elía Subsecretary of Lands for Social Habitability, a position that Kirchner created expressly for him.

=== Police station incident ===
On June 26, 2004, D'Elía led a group of activists and residents of La Boca who occupied police station #24 by force, and justified their action by claiming that the murderers of their fellow activist Martin Cisneros were enjoying police protection. The exchange of gunfire between the police and the protesters lasted for hours, causing extensive damage.

The police chief, Cayetano Greco, later testified that D'Elía had behaved aggressively and was "very violent" and "threatened to burn everything" in the station. Greco charged the government and his own superiors in the police department with failing to intervene in the situation because of D'Elía's position. He stated that although the magistrate María Angélica Crotto had authorized him to retake the police station, the Undersecretary for Civil Protection at the Ministry of Justice, José María Campagnoli, had told him to stand out and seek an agreement with the violent protesters. Greco said, "It would have been easy to recover the station" but he "was not allowed" to do so. He stated that the takeover of the police station would have gone very differently had it been led by a Kirchner opponent such as Raul Castells rather than by D'Elía.

A pregnant woman later testified that she had been inside the police station during the incident with her husband and a child, and that D'Elía and his confederates had not allowed them to leave. Greco confirmed her account. He also testified that D'Elía's group had stolen from the police station a charcoal by the artist Quinquela Martin, as well as records of court cases, hard drives, and bulletproof vests.

D'Elía and 42 of his confederates were accused of damage, theft, unlawful imprisonment, threats, injuries, and extortion, among other offenses, he enjoyed "parliamentary privileges" as a member of the Buenos Aires legislature that caused the case to proceed "very slowly" through the judicial system. An October 2004 news report stated that D'Elía's legal status as a result of the incident was growing more complicated by the day. By November 2006, the case was on its seventh judge. Greco expressed cynicism about the possibility that D'Elía would ever face justice for his actions. D'Elía was never called to testify.

Greco said that D'Elía had used the death of activist Martin Cisneros to try to regain his position within the activist community, which he had lost after entering the government.

=== Conviction for slander ===
In 2005, D'Elía said that "Eduardo Duhalde introduced drugs to Argentina." The president sued him for defamation. D'Elía requested immunity, but his request was rejected by the judges. On December 21, 2009, Judge María Romilda Servini de Cubría found him guilty and sentenced him a fine of $6.000. D'Elía did not pay the fine. The case reached the Supreme Court. In 2012 the Supreme Court upheld the conviction and imposed a $150,000 fine. D'Elía again refused to pay and said he would go to the Interamerican Court.

=== Douglas Tompkins ===
In 2006, D'Elía took on Douglas Tompkins, the American founder of the North Face and Esprit clothing lines, who had bought land in Argentina to create an ecological preserve. Accusing Tompkins of blocking access to public roads, D'Elía cut the locks on gates outside Tompkins's property and led an effort to pull down the fences around the property. "We want to tell everyone: We're going to continue cutting down fences," he said. "What is more important, the private property of a few, or the sovereignty of everyone?" He also expressed the view that "These lands should not belong to an individual, much less a foreigner," and, according to The Washington Post, "publicly hinted that he believes Tompkins is an agent of the U.S. government." He told the BBC that "The Americans are in cahoots with the Pentagon which, as you know, is building an airbase across the border in Paraguay." The BBC described him as a "stocky man with an angry mien" who identified "'tierra gringa,' the gringo lands," on a map, "like a general pinpointing the enemy."

D'Elía said he also planned to go after Italian clothing magnate Luciano Benetton, the largest private landowner in Argentina. Tompkins, who had bought millions of acres of land in both Argentina and Chile that he eventually planned to turn over to local governments as public parks, said that he found D'Elía's behavior irrational, stating: "They're shooting at the guy -- the only guy, practically, from the private sector -- who is buying land and then nationalizing it!"

=== Esquivel countermarch ===
Nobel Peace Prize winner Adolfo Perez Esquivel accused D'Elía in 2006 of trying to take over a march he, Esquivel, had organized at the Obelisco de Buenos Aires. Esquivel called D'Elía a "careerist" and accused him of using the march "for his own benefit and that of the Government." Esquivel said that he was considering filing an official complaint.

=== AMIA case, Iran, and resignation ===
On July 18, 1994, a bomb struck the headquarters of the Asociación Mutual Israelita Argentina (Argentine Israelite Mutual Association, AMIA) in Buenos Aires, killing 85 people and injuring hundreds. In 2006, Judge Rodolfo Canicoba Corral ordered the international arrest of eight former Iranian officials, including former President Ali Hashemi Rafsanjani, in connection with the bombing. D'Elía rejected the idea that Iran had been involved, and maintained that the attack had been the work of right-wing Jews.

Community leaders and relatives of the victims of the AMIA bombings characterized D'Elía's statements about the bombings as "shameful" and called him a "rival of Goebbels" who, employing Goebbels's "Big Lie" approach, turned "victims into perpetrators". Relatives and friends of the victims of the AMIA bombing described D 'Elia as the "unofficial spokesman of the Iranian government in Argentina."

In November 2006, D'Elía resigned from the government at the request of President Kirchner, but assured the media that he still had an "excellent relationship" with Kirchner. Some sources indicated that Kirchner had "kicked him out" of his position as Undersecretary of Land "for supporting Iran in the AMIA case", and that Kirchner had decided D'Elía had to go after he went to the Iranian Embassy to repudiate the Argentinian order to capture former Iranian officials for their alleged involvement in the AMIA bombing. D'Elía said that he was "proud to have belonged to this government", and blamed his departure from the government on the "Israeli-American lobby". D'Elía said that the Argentinian arrest order for the former Iranian officials had to do with "the Bush war policy" and Israel.

After D'Elía's resignation, Fernando Navarro, then head of the Buenos Aires members of the Frente para la Victoria (Front for Victory), arranged for D'Elía to receive a teachers' salary even though he was not teaching. Navarro explained the arrangement by saying that D'Elía was "a leader of society", serving Argentina in "outstanding and distinguished" ways.

In 2007, D'Elía traveled to Iran with a group of politicians and priests to deliver a letter to President Mahmoud Ahmadinejad expressing support for Iran's right to self-determination and non-interference in its internal affairs. The letter was signed by several major Argentinian cultural figures, such as filmmaker Fernando Pino Solanas, as well as the presidents of the two Mothers of Plaza de Mayo groups, Hebe de Bonafini and Nora Cortinas. D'Elía called at the time for an investigation of Argentina's "Jewish right".

It was reported on 28 April 2007 that D'Elía had spoken "highly" of Mahmoud Ahmadinejad on the previous day, and had promised to investigate "the Israeli right" for its alleged participation in the AMIA bombing.

D'Elía laid out his charges at a panel called "AMIA, The Other Truth", at the Book Fair in Buenos Aires on 29 April 2007. Joining him on the panel, and agreeing with his views, were former national deputy Mario Cafiero and Sheikh Ali Mohsen of Casa para la Difusión del Islam. Sergio Widder, Latin American representative of the Simon Wiesenthal Center, described D'Elía of using "the prestige of the Book Fair to bastardize the AMIA case". Maintaining that D'Elía's arguments at the Book Fair "were based on those of an Argentine neo-Nazi", Widder said it was "clear that D'Elía does not seem to contribute to the search for truth and is trying to divert the investigation". Widder spoke from the audience at the Book Fair event, but, he said, a "big man prevented him from continuing". Widder said, "I was not assaulted, but it was unpleasant". Widder urged the Argentinian government to respond to D'Elía's "anti-Semitic" actions.

At the request of relatives of the victims of the AMIA bombing, D'Elía was summoned by Alberto Nisman, the prosecutor investigating the bombing, to explain his comments suggesting that the bombing was the result of an Israeli "plot".

=== 2008 strike and Gahan confrontation ===
D'Elía punching a demonstrator during a rally against President Cristina Kirchner. 2008

During the first weeks of 2008, agricultural workers struck against the administration of Cristina Fernandez de Kirchner. In Buenos Aires, D'Elía led a pro-Kirchner rally, saying that he and his fellow activists were out to "break the coup that they're trying to impose." At the rally he punched Assemblyman Alejandro Gahan. In November 2011 D'Elía was sentenced to four days in prison for striking Gahan.

=== Confrontation with Fernando Peña ===
On 28 March 2008, in what the media described as "a tough and aggressive verbal exchange", D'Elía attacked actor, comedian, and radio host Fernando Peña on his radio program on Metro FM: "I hate Peña, hate your money, your house, I hate people like you", he said. "I have a visceral hatred of you, the north of the city, white people ... I hate the Argentine upper classes who have done so much damage that has killed so many people, on behalf of a single flag that is the flag of your own profit." Of white people, he said that he "would have no trouble killing them all".

In a critique of D'Elía's comments published in La Nación, Ariel Armony wrote that D'Elía's call for violence was "unacceptable", and that there was no doubt about this fact, but that D'Elía was right in claiming that many white Argentinians had contempt for their dark-skinned compatriots, and D'Elía's rage at white people could "teach" Argentina something. La Nación publicly distanced itself from Armony's remarks.

=== Coup charges ===
In June 2008, D'Elía charged Eduardo Duhalde, the "ruralistas" and the Clarín media conglomerate with engineering a conspiracy against the government. When asked by La Nación on what he was basing his accusation, he said, "We have information, but we prefer to keep it guarded." He added that Raúl Castells, whom he described as an "undercover Duhalde spokesman", had just been protested in the Plaza de Mayo against government policies.

=== Teaching position ===
As of 2008, D'Elía still held the title of head teacher at School #188 in La Matanza and insisted on being addressed as "professor", even though during that period he had held positions in government ministries. An April 2008 article about D'Elía in La Nación described him in its headline as "the teacher who has not taught for 20 years" and noted that although he had worked for only a relatively brief time as a teacher, he had retained his position and salary thanks to "political connections". On 27 April 2008, D'Elía was told that he would no longer be receiving this payment. He was furious, stating that he would complain, and that the pay was legitimate because he had "a signed agreement with the Government to coordinate 800 literacy centers".

=== Complaint against Israel bombings in Gaza ===
Remarks that D'Elía made in January 2009 about Israeli bombings in Gaza, and about Argentinian Jews, were widely criticized. Sergio Burstein, leader of a group of victims of the AMIA bombing, accused D'Elía of treating Argentine Jews as second-class citizens and of denying them their status as Argentinians.

=== Remarks on Jews and the Holocaust ===
In June 2011, D'Elía said that Sergio Schoklender, former attorney of the Mothers of Plaza de Mayo Foundation, was disqualified from high office owing to his status as a Jew, given that he might therefore be an agent of the MOSSAD. In October 2012, Holocaust survivor Sara Rus, chairman of the Holocaust Museum of Buenos Aires, noted a recent statement by D'Elía comparing Israel's actions in Gaza to the Holocaust, and wryly stated that it was interesting to see D'Elía now acknowledging the reality of the Holocaust, after having denied it on several previous occasions and having publicly supported Holocaust denier Mahmoud Ahmadinejad.

In August 2013, D'Elía took part in a meeting at the At-Tauhid mosque in Buenos Aires at which Sheikh Abdul Karim Paz, head of the mosque, called for the destruction of Israel and spoke up for Mohsen Rabbani, former cultural attaché at the Iran's embassy in Buenos Aires, who was wanted for his alleged involvement in the 1994 AMIA bombing. D'Elía "boasted" to the gathering of his contacts with Hezbollah in Lebanon, which he described as a "political party". He also said that instead of a "two states for two peoples" solution to the Israeli-Palestinian conflict, there should be a "one people, one state" solution.

=== Comment on Maduro and Lopez ===
He tweeted in February 2014 that President Nicolás Maduro of Venezuela should shoot opposition politician Leopoldo López, saying that if Peron had shot General Benjamín Menéndez, who tried to overthrow Peron, it "would have saved a lot of blood".

=== Death threat against Claudio Bonadío ===
In November 2014, after federal judge Claudio Bonadio ordered to investigate an hotel company for a corruption scandal involving the Argentine President, D'Elía said "Symbolically we should put the head of Bonadío on a pike."

== Personal life ==
He lives with his wife Lorena Felices. He has five children, Pablo, Facundo, Belén, Ayelén and Luis Ignacio.

== Bibliography ==
- Lanata, Jorge (2012). Luis D'Elía, vida y obra del polémico dirigente social [Luis D'Elía, life and work of the controversial social leader] (in Spanish). Buenos Aires, Argentina: Periodismo para todos.
