= Murder of Mariano Ferreyra =

Argentine student killed in 2010

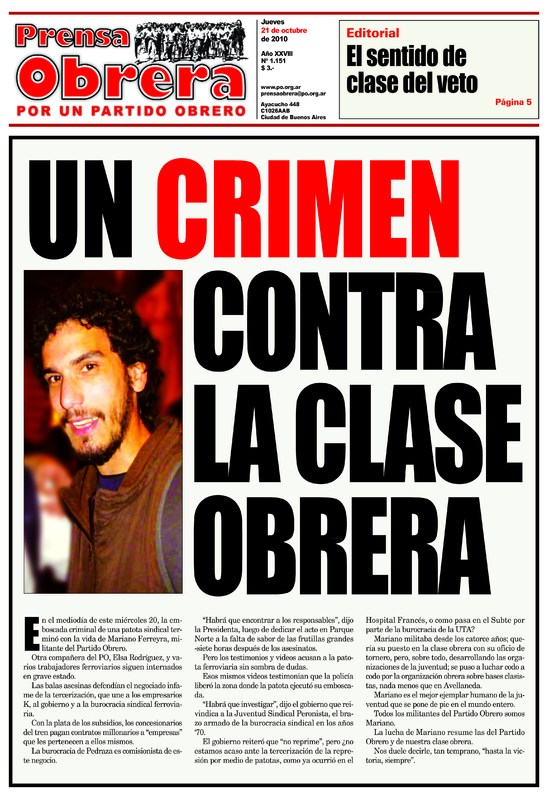
Image of Mariano Ferreyra in Prensa Obrera. The headline reads: "A crime against the working class".

On 20 October 2010, Argentine student and Trotskyist activist Mariano Ferreyra was shot dead in Buenos Aires by members of a railway workers union.

== Incident ==
Mariano Ferreyra (born 3 June 1987 in Sarandí) was an Argentine student active in the Workers' Party (Partido Obrero). During a dispute involving railway workers in Buenos Aires, he was shot by supporters of the Peronist Unión Ferroviaria (railways union), affiliated to the CGT, in a clash with socialist workers. Two other people were injured in the shooting. One, Elsa Rodríguez, a mother of three, was seriously injured and still fighting for her life in hospital a week later. At the time, it was alleged that the police stood by. Ferreyra's death led to widespread protests in Argentina.

It was later proved that José Pedraza (leader of the Unión Ferroviaria) had ordered his people to shoot and create incidents. Former President Néstor Kirchner took a personal interest in the case, sheltering witnesses in his home, until he died a week later.

In April 2013, Pedraza was condemned to fifteen years in prison. Due to his age, he was placed under house arrest in 2016, dying there in December 2018.

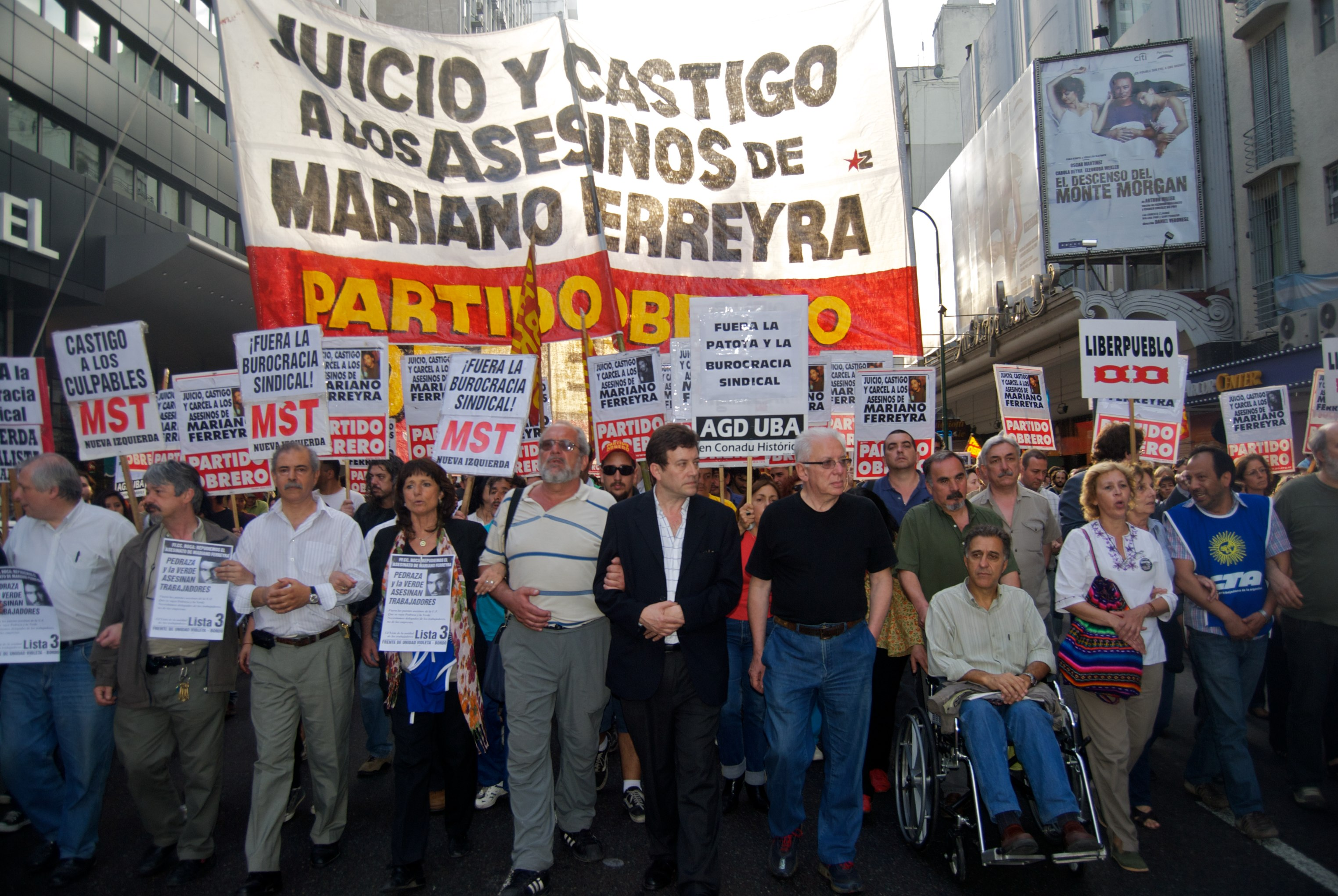
Protest march seeking justice for Ferreyra

== See also ==
- Rubén Sobrero
