= Amanda Martín =

Argentine politician

Amanda Martín is an activist in the Workers' Party. She is also a history teacher and a trade unionist.

She became a member of the legislature of the Autonomous City of Buenos Aires in June 2021, as a candidate of the Workers' Left Front; she will hold the seat until December 2023.
