= Abdul Karim Paz =

Argentinian sheikh

Abdul Karim Paz Sheikh

Personal life
- Born: Santiago Ricardo Paz Zuberbühler Bullrich
- Spouse: Masuma Assad (born Roxana Elizabeth Assad)
- Children: Fátima, Miriam, Nur
- Parents: Ricardo Alejandro Paz Zuberbühler (1932-2003) (father); Mercedes Bullrich Terra (mother)
- Education: University of Buenos Aires (Licentiate in Philosophy), Al-Mustafa International University (Master's in Islamic theology)

Religious life
- Religion: Islam
- Denomination: Shia

Abdul Karim Paz (born Santiago Ricardo Paz Zuberbühler Bullrich) is an Argentine Shi'i sheikh and the head imam of the At-Tauhid ("the Oneness") mosque in the Floresta neighborhood. Paz also serves as a representative of Organización Islámica Argentina.

He has close ties with social leader Luis D'Elía and piquetero leader Fernando Esteche, as well as with Mohsen Rabbani, former cultural attaché at the Iranian embassy in Buenos Aires and an accused in the AMIA trial.

== Biography ==
Paz is descended from an aristocratic Argentine family. He was educated at the elite Catholic school San Martín de Tours but later converted to Islam at the age of 18, after becoming acquainted with Arab and Islamic cultures through a college professor, while studying philosophy at UBA. He then spent five years studying in Qom, Iran, studying Islamic jurisprudence and theology at the Al-Mustafa International University. He returned to Buenos Aires in 1993 with the honorific title of Hujjat al-Islam and a master's degree in Islamic theology. He later moved briefly to Santiago Chile, where he established an Islamic cultural centre. His wife, Masuma Assad Paz, is the head of the Argentine Muslim Women's League, the editor of Moazzen, and director of the activities of the Argentine Islamic Aid and Relief Committee and the Argentine Islamic Cultural Institute.

Paz is a cousin of Patricia Bullrich and a close relative to Esteban Bullrich, both of whom served as ministers during the Macri administration.
