= Rubén Sobrero =

Argentine trade union leader (born 1961)

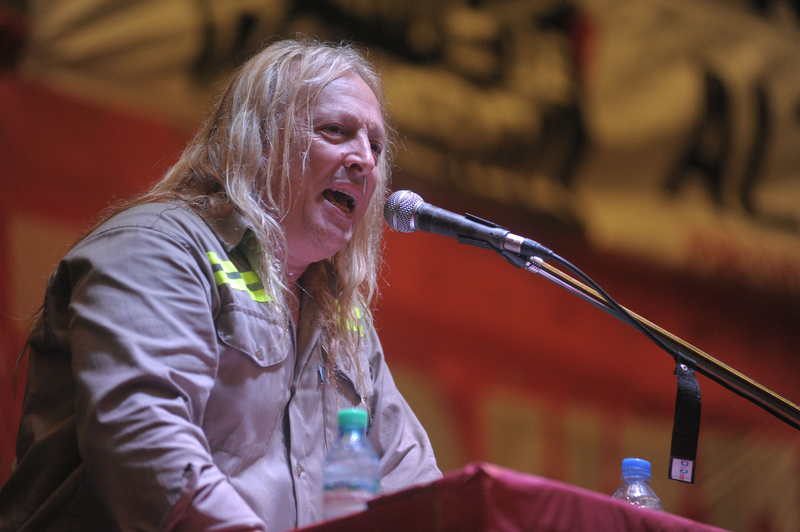
Ruben Sobrero in 2015

Rubén Darío El Pollo Sobrero (Buenos Aires, 1961) is the leader of the Haedo chapter of the rail workers trade union of Argentina. Sobrero is ideologically aligned with the Trotskyist left. He opposed the railroad trade union (UF), formerly led by Jose Pedraza, who was convicted for killing activist Mariano Ferreyra in October 2010. Sobrero had accused Pedraza of being an "entrepreneur" and a member of the board of directors of the Ferrocarril General Manuel Belgrano railway company.

On the morning of 30 September 2011, he was arrested in connection with arson attacks on railroad cars in May and remained in custody until 4 October 2011. Jorge Altamira, presidential candidate of the Workers Left Front, had called for his release. Sobrero was acquitted of all charges on 11 November 2011.
