= Youth and Dignity Left Movement =

Youth and Dignity Left Movement Movimiento Izquierda Juventud Dignidad
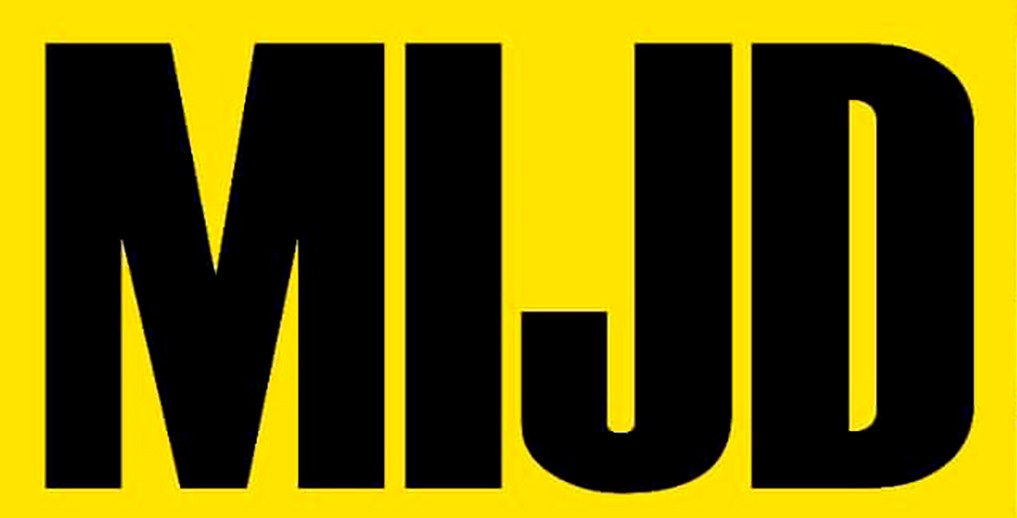
- Abbreviation: MIJD
- Leader: Raúl Castells; Santiago Cúneo
- Founded: 2021
- Preceded by: Independent Movement for Justice and Dignity
- Headquarters: Buenos Aires
- Ideology: Big tent Factions: Conservatism; Confederalism; Bukelism; Guevarism; Orthodox Peronism
- Political position: Catch-all; Factions: Far-left to far-right

Youth and Dignity Left Movement (Spanish: Movimiento Izquierda Juventud Dignidad; MIJD) is a political party in Argentina. It was created by Raúl Castells in 2021 as a successor to the Independent Movement for Justice and Dignity.

== History ==
In the 2021 legislative elections the party failed to pass the PASO.

In the 2023 general election the party will compete in an internal one, on the one hand there will be Santiago Cúneo as president and Gustavo Barranco as vice president, the formula whose ideology hovers between nationalism, confederalism, anti-liberalism and bukelism. On the other is the guevarism piquetero Raúl Castells, who will run for president along with Ariana Reinoso as vice president.
