= Julio Bárbaro =

Argentine political scientist (born 1942)

Julio Donato Bárbaro (Buenos Aires, January 29, 1942) is an Argentine writer, professor, and Peronist politician. He graduated in political science from the University of Salvador. During 1973–1976, he was a national deputy. During the presidency of Carlos Menem he was Secretary of Culture of the Nation (1989–1991), and during the presidencies of Néstor Kirchner and Cristina Fernández he worked as intervener of the Federal Broadcasting Committee. At the end of his term as intervener, he continued his work as an intellectual writing books and articles for periodicals, and his weekly column in Infobae stands out.

== Biography ==
He was born in the Buenos Aires neighborhood of Boedo, the son of Próspero Bárbaro, a mattress maker who worked as a machine-shoulderer, a socialist follower of Alfredo Palacios, and Velia Reselli, a seamstress and homemaker.

== Kidnapping and disappearance ==
On September 2, 1981, Bárbaro was kidnapped along with Juan Carlos Gallegos, whose partner he was in his public advertising agency, and former national deputy Nilda Garré. The paramilitary group presented itself as part of the Federal Coordination of the Federal Police and was led by Aníbal Gordon, a former member of the far-right terrorist group Triple A. Garré was released two hours later, while Bárbaro and Gallego remained missing almost the entire day. Garré was released two hours later, while Bárbaro and Gallego remained missing almost the entire day. They were taken to a clandestine center, where they were beaten and interrogated. The kidnapping of Bárbaro, Gallegos, and Garré was investigated by Judge Martín Irurzum, as part of the investigation into the activities of Triple A, Aníbal Gordon, trade unionist Lorenzo Miguel, and General Otto Carlos Paladino, head of the State Intelligence Service in 1976.

As the Chief of the Cabinet of Ministers,he was reconfirmed in that position by President Cristina Fernández de Kirchner upon taking office.

On April 1, 2008, due to his wife's illness, he resigned from the Federal Broadcasting Committee.
