= Principles and Values =

Principles and Values Principios y Valores
- Abbreviation: PyV
- Leader: Guillermo Moreno
- President: Guillermo Moreno
- Vice President: Horacio Valdez
- Founder: Guillermo Moreno
- Founded: 17 October 2020
- Split from: Justicialist Party
- Headquarters: José Ignacio Rucci 1408, Province of Buenos Aires
- Youth wing: Juventud Principios y Valores
- Ideology: Peronism; Orthodox Peronism; Creole nationalism Rosism; Christian humanism Panhispanism; Economic positions: Distributism; Agrarian reform Anti-globalization
- Political position: Right-wing
- Slogan: Hagamos Argentina grande otra vez. (lit. 'Let's make Argentina great again.')
- Seats in the Chamber of Deputies: 0 / 257
- Seats in the Senate: 0 / 72
- Province Governors: 0 / 24

Website
- www.principiosyvalores.org

The Principles and Values (Spanish: Principios y Valores; PyV) is an Argentine political party founded on 17 October 2020. The party considers itself Peronist, which strongly embraces the ideas of Juan Perón, and has been described as orthodox peronist and right-wing, but they identify themselves as centrist or third position. It has definitive legal status as a district party in the Province of Buenos Aires.

== History ==
=== Foundation ===
The economist Guillermo Moreno announced its foundation on 17 October 2020, making clear reference to the Peronist Loyalty Day, celebrated that same day. The party construction sought to have a "doctrinal expression" within Peronism.

== Ideology ==
The party seeks to adopt the figure of Juan Domingo Perón in all areas, developing an economic plan from a justicialista perspective. Likewise, Moreno pointed out that all the candidates on his list are Peronists. The party proclaims itself as Pure Peronism.
