= Prensa Obrera =

Argentine newspaper

- Por un partido obrero For a workers' party
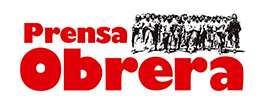

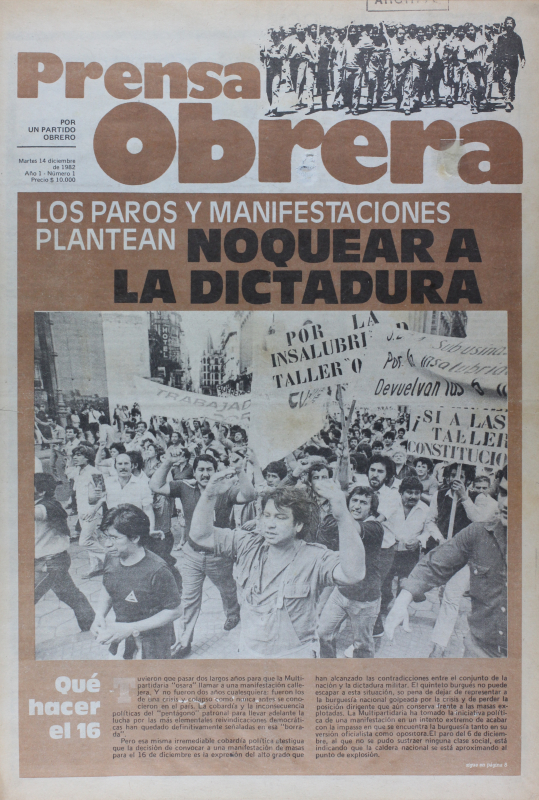
- Prensa Obrera #1 cover, 1982.
- Type: Weekly newspaper
- Format: Tabloid
- Owner: Workers' Party
- Founded: December 14, 1982; 43 years ago
- Political alignment: Left wing
- Language: Spanish
- City: Buenos Aires
- Country: Argentina
- ISSN: 0329-8760
- OCLC number: 14090713
- Website: prensaobrera.com
- Free online archives: yes

Prensa Obrera (Workers' Press) is the weekly newspaper edited by the Workers' Party (PO) of Argentina. The first edition went out in the year 1982. In 2010 it reached a thousand editions. It has a circulation of 15,000 copies weekly.
