= Guillermo Moreno =

Argentine politician

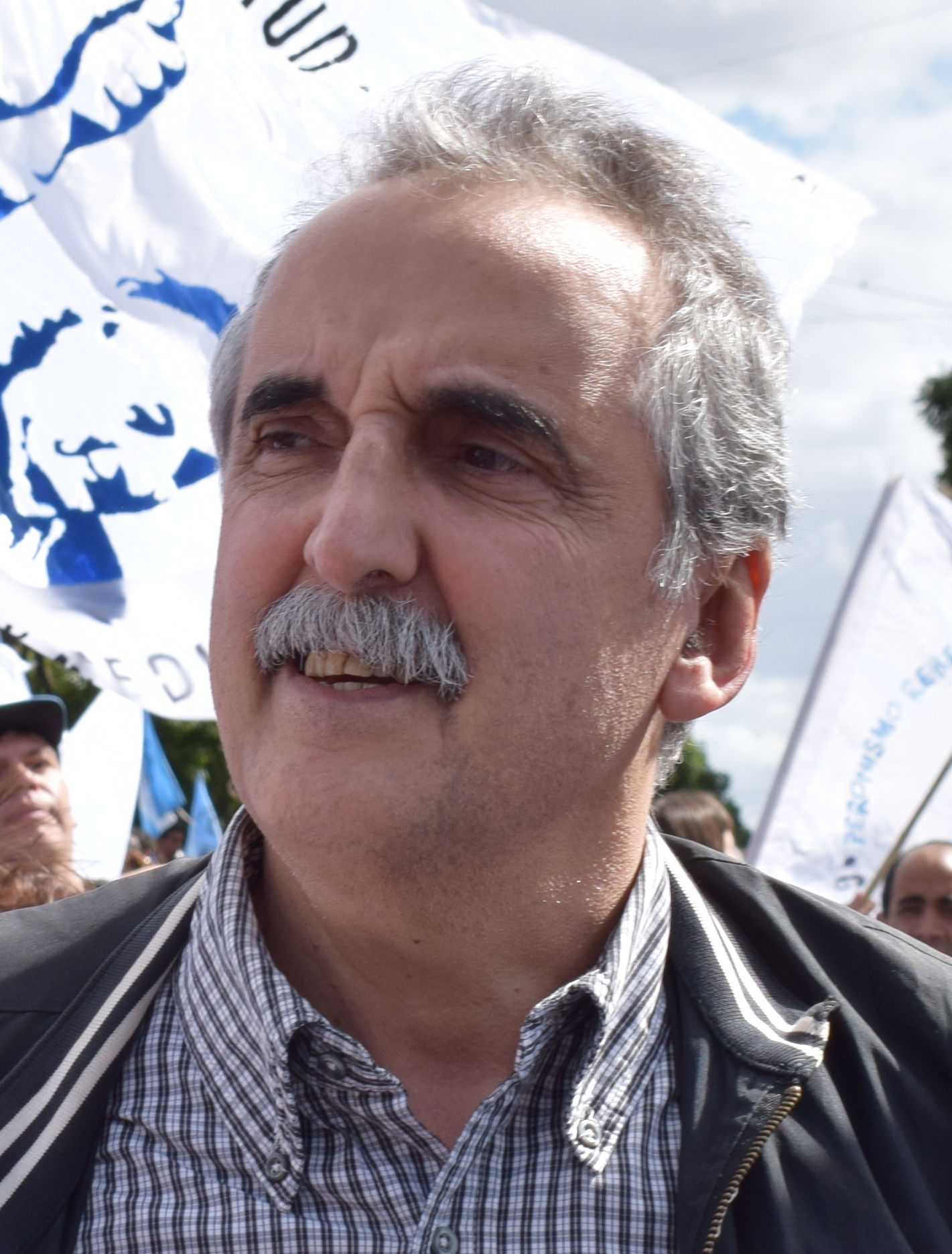
- Moreno in 2019.

Minister of Domestic Trade
- In office 11 October 2006 – 2 December 2013
- President: Néstor Kirchner; Cristina Fernández de Kirchner
- Preceded by: Miguel Gustavo Peirano
- Succeeded by: Augusto Costa

Under-Secretary of Production for the City of Buenos Aires
- In office 1990–1993

Personal details
- Born: 15 October 1955 (age 71) Buenos Aires, Argentina
- Party: Principles and Values
- Education: Universidad Argentina de la Empresa

Guillermo Moreno (born 15 October 1955) is an Argentine politician. He served from 2005 to 2013 as Minister of Domestic Trade, a position to which he was appointed by President Néstor Kirchner and in which he remained under the presidency of Cristina Fernández de Kirchner until his resignation, in the midst of scandal, in November 2013. He was found guilty in March 2014 of abuse of authority and was economic attaché at the Argentine embassy in Rome.

A 2011 Financial Times (FT) article stated that Moreno was widely viewed as “Argentina’s de facto economy minister.” Moreno, wrote the opposition-aligned Infobae news website in 2013, “is the man who drives the economy of Argentina.”

At the time of his resignation, Bloomberg News described Moreno as “the most feared government official” who had spent eight years “controlling prices and imports using strong-arm tactics that earned him a reputation as a bully.”

== Early life and education ==
Moreno's parents were Victoria and Mario Antonio Moreno Bravo. He grew up in the southern suburbs of Buenos Aires. In 1970, the Moreno family purchased a house in the neighborhood of Villa Lugano. During the years that followed, Moreno began to be politically active. He is said to have been an active member of the left-wing group Peronist Youth, which is most well known for its resistance to dictatorships in Argentina, although some acquaintances have said he was a Catholic activist. By 1982, he had become firmly a Peronist activist. After democracy returned to Argentina, he opened a hardware store, Distribuidora America, in the town of San Martin, and completed his degree in economics at the Argentine University of Business (UADE).

== Government career ==
His first government position was Under-Secretary of Production in the Buenos Aires City Government, under mayor Carlos Grosso, in the early 1990s. He later became an assistant to the Trade Secretary during the presidency of Eduardo Duhalde (2002–2003). Moreno was linked with economists Eduardo Curia, Pablo Challú, and Daniel Carbonetto and with union leader Omar Viviani. He was also an advisor to the Argentine Workers Movement (MTA).

He later served as an advisor to Pablo Challú at the Ministry of Domestic Trade and as an official in the Ministry for the Protection of Competition, both under the presidency of Eduardo Duhalde.

Moreno became close to Néstor Kirchner before Kirchner became president in 2003. He was one of the members of the Calafate Group, a think-tank created by Kirchner and others as a forum to foster ideas that would reverse the neo-liberal policies of the 1990s.

In Kirchner's government, Moreno served as Secretary of Communications for a few months in 2005. Moreno was named Secretary of Domestic Trade by Néstor Kirchner in November 2005. He remained in the post after Kirchner was succeeded in the presidency by his wife, Cristina Fernández de Kirchner, in 2007.

=== Perception ===
Moreno has been described as “mak[ing] decisions…with an iron hand” and as having a “a style of permanent confrontation.” Néstor Kirchner “liked to say tongue in cheek that Moreno was as gentle as Lassie, the famed collie of movie and television.” “Moreno has no magic recipe or even particular policies,” stated the Financial Times in 2011. “But in general, what he says, goes.” Moreno's “methodology is intimidation,” the FT added, noting that “he has been rumoured in the past to carry a gun and he took boxing gloves to a meeting of shareholders of a key newsprint company in which the state has a stake in a bid to show who was boss.” The newsprint company was Papel Prensa SA, which is controlled by Grupo Clarín SA, Argentina's largest media conglomerate.

The FT maintained that “many businessmen prefer silence to crossing with him – perhaps remembering Martín Lousteau, a former economy minister, who defied him over farm export tariffs. Moreno was seen at an event running his fingers across his throat, indicating Lousteau was playing a fatal game: the minister indeed lost his job, while Moreno has gone from strength to strength.” Miguel Jorge, Brazilian Minister of Development and Industry, said in a 2007 interview that he had no interest in further meetings with Moreno, who had put a revolver on the table during a negotiation, apparently in order to intimidate his counterparts.

=== Inflation rate and INDEC ===
Graciela Bevacqua, the chief statistician overseeing the formulation of consumer price data at INDEC, the National Statistics and Censuses Institute, accused Moreno in 2006 of having requested the names of the stores surveyed in the calculation of the retail price index. She refused, on the grounds that the Secrecy Act forbade her to disclose such information to him. Moreno's removal of Bevacqua from her post, and his firing of other officials who refused to understate the inflation rate, made him the target of nationwide criticism. He allegedly followed these moves by having phones tapped and using other surveillance methods to control internal disagreements at the bureau.

Bevacqua recalled in a 2009 interview that Moreno had called her into his office on May 29, 2006, and had angrily criticized her statistical methodology and accused her of being “unpatriotic” for not disclosing to him the requested details about the inflation rate. “I’ll do it like in the old Peronist days,” he shouted, threatening to “delete” official data at will. After leaving INDEC, Bevacqua recounted, she was unable to find other work because of pressure exerted by her superiors, apparently on orders from Kirchner and Moreno.

=== Anti-Clarín activities ===
As part of an attack on the newspaper Clarín, which he accused of presenting a distorted view of the Kirchener government, Moreno displayed balloons reading “Clarín lies” during a 2012 visit to Vietnam. Also in that year, he handed out small cakes to members of Congress decorated with the same words. The Telegraph reported in October 2013 that Moreno had ordered major Argentine retailers the previous February not to advertise in media owned by Clarín, or in La Nación and Perfil. The Wall Street Journal reported that he was the subject of a criminal investigation into charges that he had given these orders.

== Other activities ==
Moreno reportedly pressured Argentina's leading importers to boycott U.S. companies.

According to a 2010 article in Mercopress, Moreno made it an “unwritten rule” that Argentine supermarkets must not import goods from Brazil that were also made in Argentina.

When a leader of the textile firm, Kowsef SA, criticized Argentina's prohibitive tax level on textiles and refused to meet with Moreno, the government accused Kowsef of running illegal-immigrant sweatshops. The ensuing controversy surrounding Kowsef was described as the effect of “the long arm of Guillermo Moreno.”

== Praise and criticism ==
A 2008 article in La Nación warned that the “emphatic praise” for Moreno that had been proffered by the Kirchner administration in the wake of the INDEC controversy could cause trouble for Kirchner, given the low esteem in which Moreno was held in many quarters. La Nación quoted Senator Ernesto Sanz as saying that “Moreno is one of the most incapable and worthless men in this government. Everywhere he has touched, he has created disasters.” The INDEC would not be trusted again, maintained Sanz, unless Moreno and his entire staff were replaced.

The Financial Times identified Moreno in 2011 as Argentina's “weapon” in the fight “to curb rising food prices and to ration gas to factories, to quell petrol price hikes and to block imports,” as well as “to control the black market exchange rate.” Moreno pursued price controls covering basic food products and bread prices. Moreno also introduced a government-issued “SuperCard,” also known in the media as a “Morenocard,” in 2013 as an alternative to regular credit cards.

Opposition figure Adrian Perez, head of the Civic Coalition in the Chamber of Deputies, said that Moreno was a criminal and “completely inefficient.” Oscar Aguad, head of the UCR's bloc of deputies, said that having Moreno as Secretary of Domestic Trade was a “discouragement to investment,” given that Moreno provides “false statistics,” “price controls,” and profit limits. and it has often been argued that he exerts far more influence in national politics than would be reasonably expected, considering his office as a Secretary, formally subordinated to the Minister of Economics. It is believed his power struggle against former Minister Martín Lousteau was the main reason behind the latter's resignation in April 2008, after four months in office.

== Trial and resignation ==
In September 2013, Moreno was prosecuted before Judge Claudio Bonadio for dereliction of duty and abuse of authority in the INDEC matter. The charge was brought in 2011 by economist Jorge Todesca of the consultancy firm Finsoport. Todesca had been economy vice-minister under Eduardo Duhalde and was one of more than a dozen experts whom Moreno had fined 500,000 pesos apiece in 2010 for disseminating a version of the Consumer Price Index that differed from the official CPI. Bonadio froze 50,000 pesos worth of Moreno's assets.

Moreno resigned his cabinet position on November 19, 2013, effective December 2. After his resignation, he was named economic attache at the Argentine embassy in Rome.

He was replaced by Axel Kicillof. After Moreno's resignation, Eduardo Hecker of the consulting firm DEL told Bloomberg that the Argentine government was “acknowledging that there is a problem in the macro-economy and that Moreno’s policies have failed to fix it.” Hecker added that Moreno's resignation “shows that there was a political fight inside the inner circle that was won by Kicillof, who will became the most powerful economy minister from both Kirchner administrations as he has been the only one able to oust Moreno.”

When President Cristina Fernández de Kirchner arrived in Rome in March 2014 to visit the Pope, Moreno met her at the airport. A few days later, on March 20, Moreno was found guilty by Judge Bonadio of abuse of authority.

Bloomberg News noted in late 2013 that despite his legal troubles, Moreno's annual income had increased during that year by 26 percent to 2.26 million pesos.

== Personal life ==
Moreno was married in the early eighties to a psychologist, of Syrian Jewish origin. They are divorced and have two children, Joseph Paul and Victoria. He is currently in a long-time relationship with Amelia Marta Cascales, who has been described as his “battle partner” and legal bodyguard. Cascales is described as having her “own place” in the constellation of “K power,” and as having “managed to establish a personal relationship with the President” and won “trust…in the first circle of Kirchner power.” Cascales has been deputy director of the state-owned firms Energy Argentina SA (Enarsa) and Soluciones Satelitales Argentinas SA, and served as notary in Néstor Kirchner's establishment of Meldorek SA and in the formation of several other businesses; she also helped produce the TV miniseries The Pact, which presents the relationship between the Clarín media empire, the largest media conglomerate in Argentina, and the various anti-Peronist military dictatorships.
