= Vilma Ripoll =

Argentinian politician

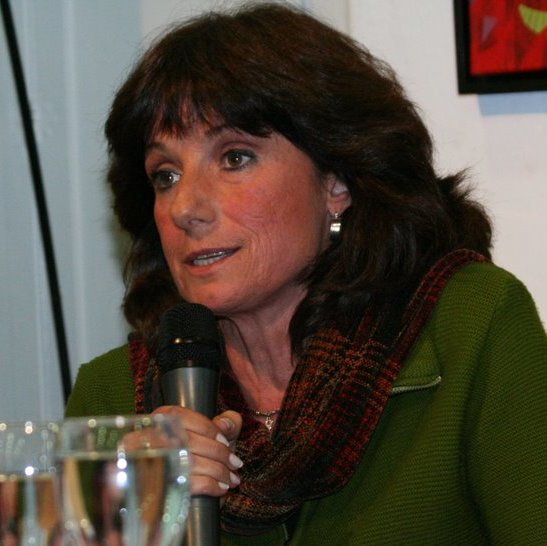

Member of the Buenos Aires City Legislature
- In office August 7, 2000 – December 14, 2004
- Succeeded by: Marcos Wolman

Personal details
- Born: 12 April 1954 (age 72) Firmat, Santa Fe Province, Argentina
- Party: Workers' Socialist Movement
- Education: National University of Rosario

Vilma Ripoll (born 12 April 1954) is an Argentine nurse and politician.

== Life and times ==
Vilma Ana Ripoll was born in Firmat, Santa Fe Province, in 1954. She enrolled at the National University of Rosario School of Medicine, and earned a degree in nursing in 1975; while a student, in 1973, Ripoll co-founded the Centro de Estudiantes de Enfermería (Nursing Student Center). Ripoll helped organize a relief mission for workers at an Acindar steel plant in Villa Constitución whose health benefits had been cut in retaliation for their electing a left-wing shop steward. She then later joined the Trotskyist Socialist Workers' Party. These activities made her a target during the subsequent Dirty War, however, and in 1977, she left her post at the government health service, PAMI, and sought refuge in Colombia.

She continued her support for labor unions while in Colombia, and co-founded the Health Workers' Union (SUTS). She returned to Argentina following the return to democratic rule in 1983, and from 1989 to 1999, served as shop steward of the Italian Hospital of Buenos Aires employees union, during which tenure she was elected to the Health Workers' Federation (FATSA) congress. Ripoll ran against the union's director, West Ocampo, for the post, but was defeated.

She was, however, elected to the Buenos Aires City Legislature on the Socialist Workers' Movement (MST) ticket in 2000, and re-elected in 2003. That year she also unsuccessfully ran for Chief of Government (mayor) of Buenos Aires. An agreement between the MST and the Communist Party of Argentina resulted in her resignation from the body in December 2004, in favor of Marcos Wolman.

Ripoll returned to her administrative post at the Italian Hospital. An obstetrician by practice, she became known for her support of the legalization of abortion in Argentina. An estimated 500,000 abortions are performed annually in Argentina (compared to around 700,000 live births), resulting in at least 10,000 hospitalizations due to complications, as well as over 100 deaths; Ripoll cited the example of Spain, were maternal deaths fell dramatically, and the number of procedures themselves fell by over half, following its legalization.

She ran for a seat in the Argentine Chamber of Deputies for the Province of Buenos Aires in 2005, and, with veteran actor Héctor Bidonde, for the Presidency in 2007; but she failed on both occasions.
