= Raúl Castells =

Argentine political activist (born 1950)

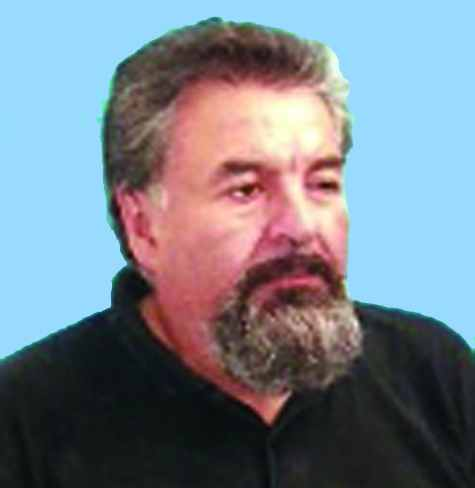
Raúl Castells

Raúl Castells (born 1950 in Rosario) is a controversial Argentine political activist. He was the leader of an organization called the Independent Movement for the Retired and Unemployed (in Spanish: Movimiento Independiente de Jubilados y Desocupados, MIJD), a piquetero group. In 2021, he founded the Youth and Dignity Left Movement (in Spanish: Movimiento Izquierda Juventud Dignidad, MIJD).

Castells moved in 1984 to Santa Fe, where he would spend the next twenty years. He has been detained a number of times under the administration of President Néstor Kirchner (2003–2007); he and his supporters have protested that he is being politically persecuted. Though Castells has sympathizers in Argentina, many other people disagree with his views.

Castells had a documentary made about him and his movement, called Raul The Terrible. It was made by Australian political filmmaker David Bradbury and writer/producer Carlos Alperin. A 'warts-and-all portrait of a man driven to change the world and a frightening insight into the politics of poverty.'

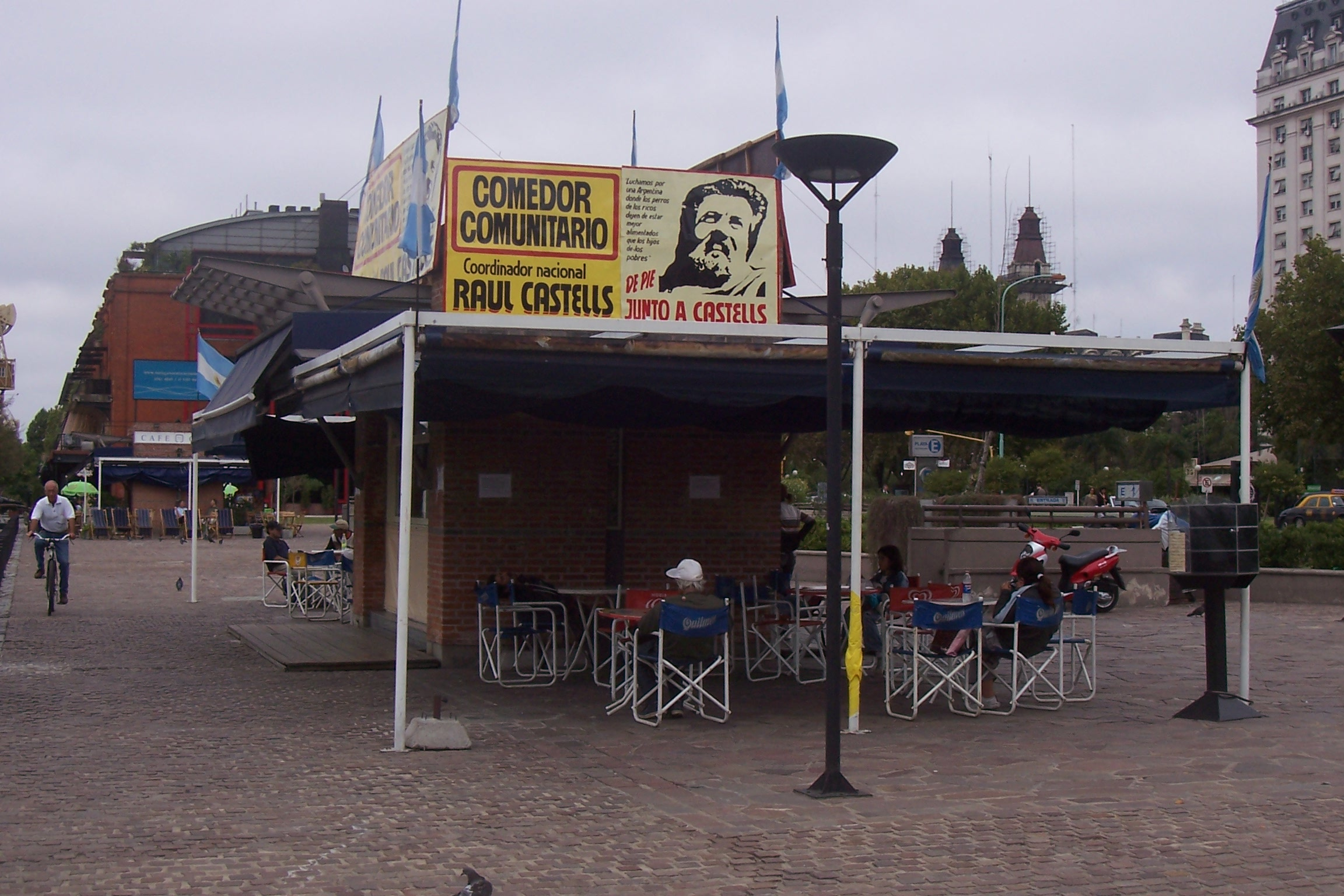
Raúl Castells exhorts passersby from a billboard above his Puerto Madero dinette.

In the beginning of March 2006, Castells was given permission to open a community kitchen for poor people at Puerto Madero, the most expensive and wealthy neighbourhood in the city. The site was donated by a business owner in the area who got his permit revoked. The building, offering free food to the poor, is situated opposite the Hilton Hotel and is topped with the words "We are fighting for an Argentina in which the dogs of the rich don't eat better than the children of the poor". The project has proven controversial, with concerns about the influx of large numbers of impoverished people expressed by some local business owners.
