= Workers' Party (Argentina) =

Argentine Trotskyist political party

Workers' Party Partido Obrero
- Abbreviation: PO
- Founded: 1964 as Política Obrera (Workers' Policy)
- Headquarters: Bartolomé Mitre 2162 Buenos Aires, Argentina
- Ideology: Communism; Trotskyism
- Political position: Far-left
- National affiliation: Workers' Left Front
- Colors: Red, yellow
- Seats in the Chamber of Deputies: 1 / 257
- Seats in the Senate: 0 / 72

Website
- www.po.org.ar

The Workers' Party (Spanish: Partido Obrero, PO) is an Argentine Trotskyist political party. It was the largest national section of the Co-ordinating Committee for the Refoundation of the Fourth International.

In the 2009 legislative election, the party received 1.1% of the vote. Its strongest vote in this and some other recent elections has been in Salta Province in the north west, particularly in the city of Salta itself; its next best was in neighbouring Catamarca.

Its members have included Jorge Altamira, Néstor Pitrola, Claudio del Plá, Amanda Martin and Mariano Ferreyra.

It participates in the Workers' Left Front, which had some success in elections in 2011. Following elections in 2013 it now has two national deputies, and several provincial deputies and councilors.

== Organization ==
Funding The party is financed entirely by its supporters and militants. Due to its class politics it does not receive any money from private or public sources that could compromise its political actions. Members have the obligation of giving 5% of their wages to the party, in the case of members that hold elected office, they keep a sum equal to the minimum wage and they donate the rest to the party. Not adhering to protests and demonstrations would result in not receiving social assistance.

Trade Unions The Worker's Party directs the Associated Teachers' Union, the main teaching union of the University of Buenos Aires. It is also part of the Sitraic (Syndicate of Workers of the Construction Industry and Affiliates) leadership, a combative union facing the Uocra (Union of Construction Workers of the Argentine Republic) leadership . It also directs the SUTNA (Single Union of Argentine Tire Workers) belonging to the CTA of workers since 2016. It also organizes numerous groups of workers, with regional and national reach. In the teaching union, the current Teaching Tribune developed, which participates in the direction of some sections of SUTEBA-CTERA and also develops an important activity in UTE-CTERA, ATEN-CTERA, ADOSAC-CTERA, UEPC-CTERA and the Self-convened Teachers of Salta. In the UTA (Transportation and underground train union) participates in various sectors such as Ecotrans, Subte (Metrolines), Line 168 and Line 60 with affiliations by company and the Classical Transport Group nationwide. The Worker's Party has a long tradition with graphics unions and has various delegates in various factories and in the Graphic Orange, the main opposition to union leadership. It is also in the front lines of the struggle in the press workers union (UTPBA) through the Orange Press. Inside the telephone industry (FOETRA) organizes the Telephone Orange. Other affiliated groups are the Health Tribune, Worker's Fiber, as well as The Orange Television. Combative Mercantile groups and the orange list of university teachers. In addition, the Workers' Party has a presence among the fairgrounds of the Centennial Park, painters, and paper makers, among others.

== Publications ==
Its main publication is the weekly Prensa Obrera (Workers' Press), started in 1982. Its articles are often distributed and translated in other countries. This publication has the function of being the main distributor of their ideas and analysis. In December 2007 it reached the 1,000th edition. On December 3, 2019, a publication edited by a new segment that was formed within the party during the internal crisis of 2019, Política Obrera, began to circulate.
