= 2015 Argentine general election =

- Presidential election
- 25 October 2015 (first round); 22 November 2015 (second round)
- Registered: 32,130,853 (first round); 32,108,509 (second round)
- Turnout: 81.07% (first round); 80.77% (second round)
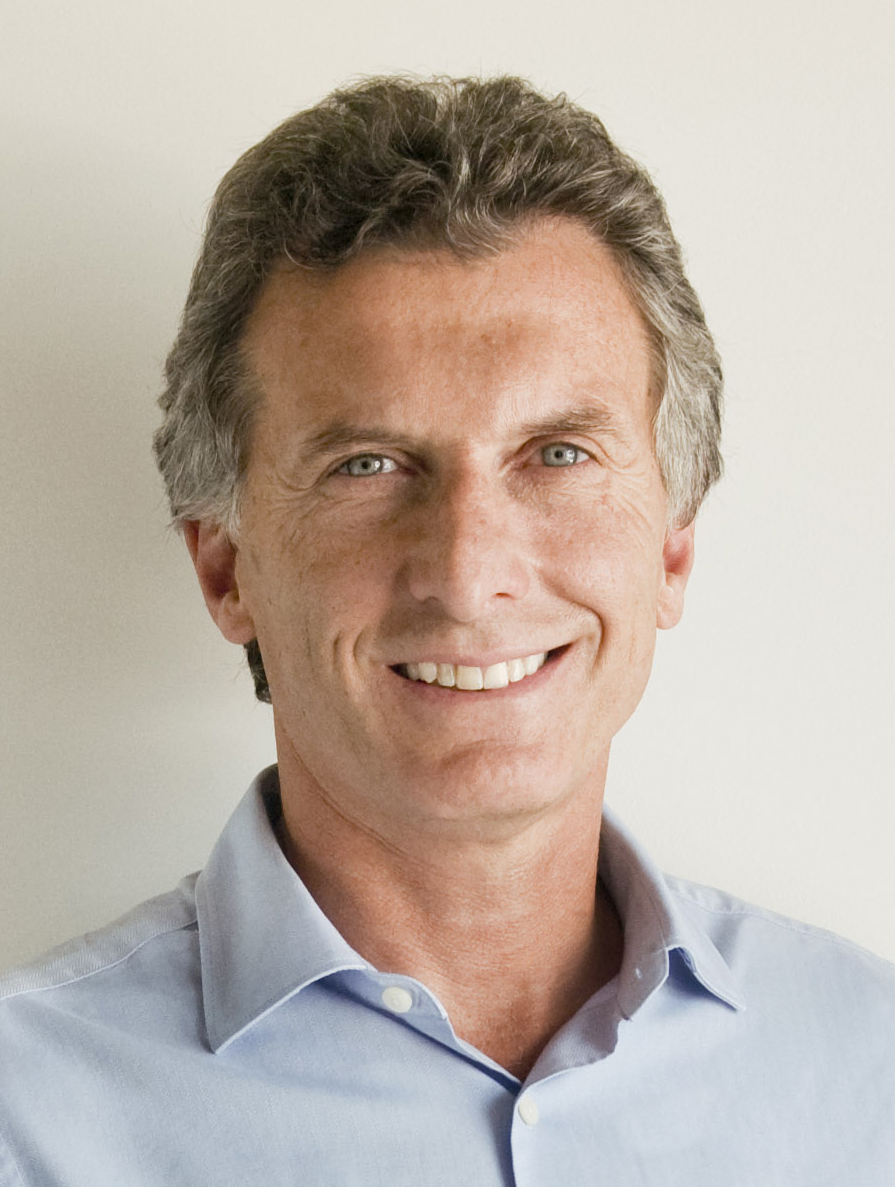

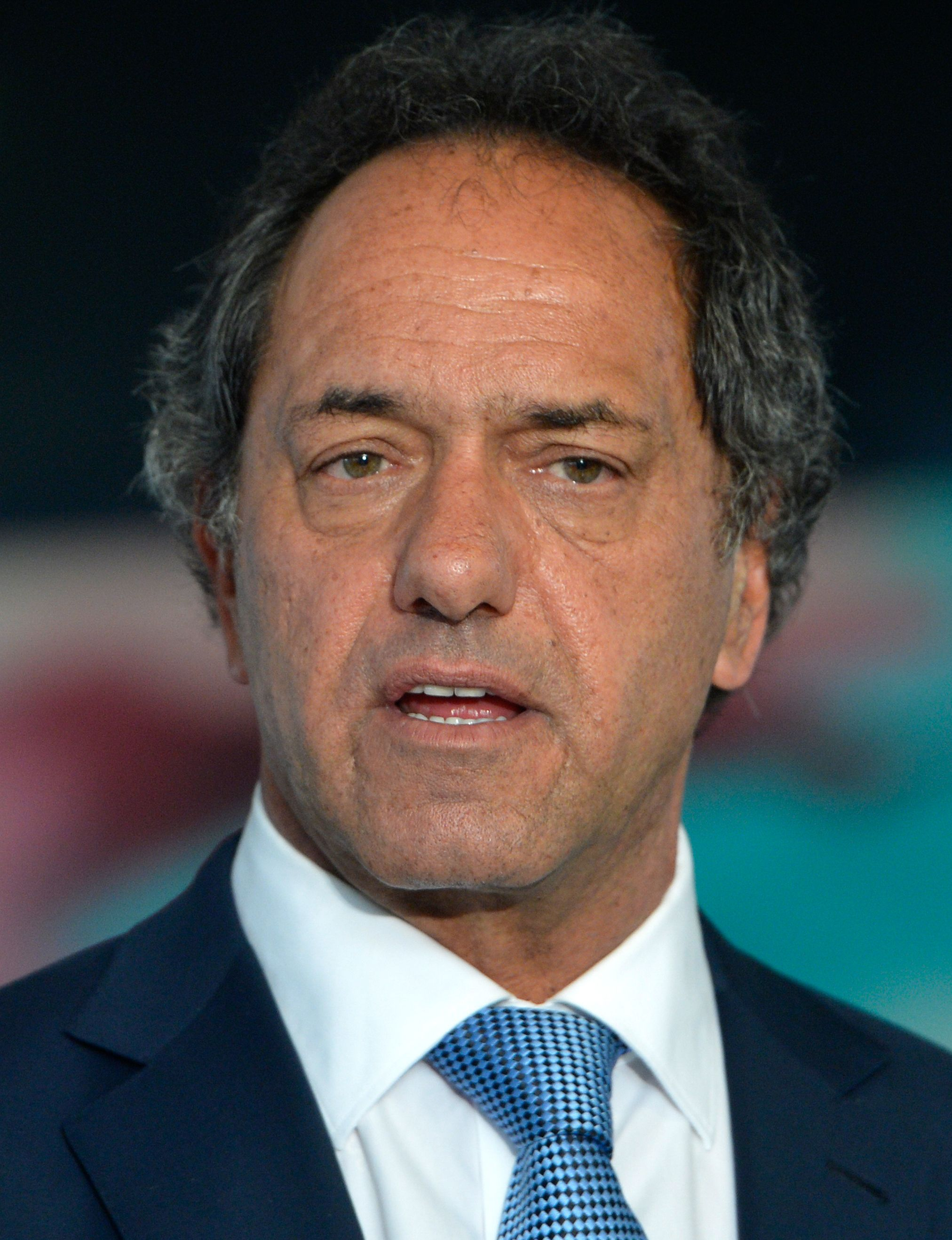
| Nominee | Mauricio Macri | Daniel Scioli |
| Party | PRO | PJ |
| Alliance | Cambiemos | FPV |
| Running mate | Gabriela Michetti | Carlos Zannini |
| States carried | 8 + CABA | 15 |
| Popular vote | 12,988,349 | 12,309,575 |
| Percentage | 51.34% | 48.66% |
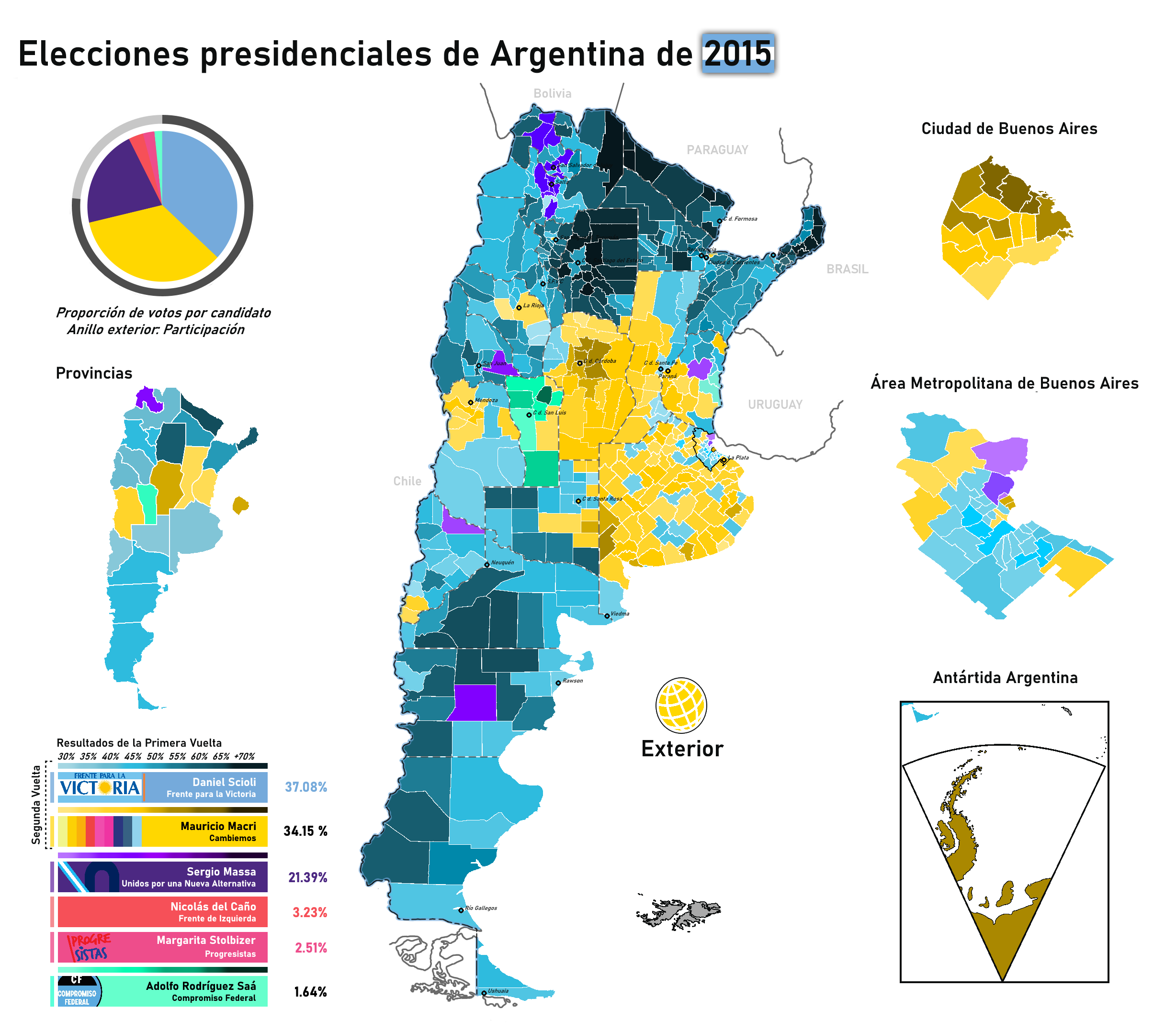
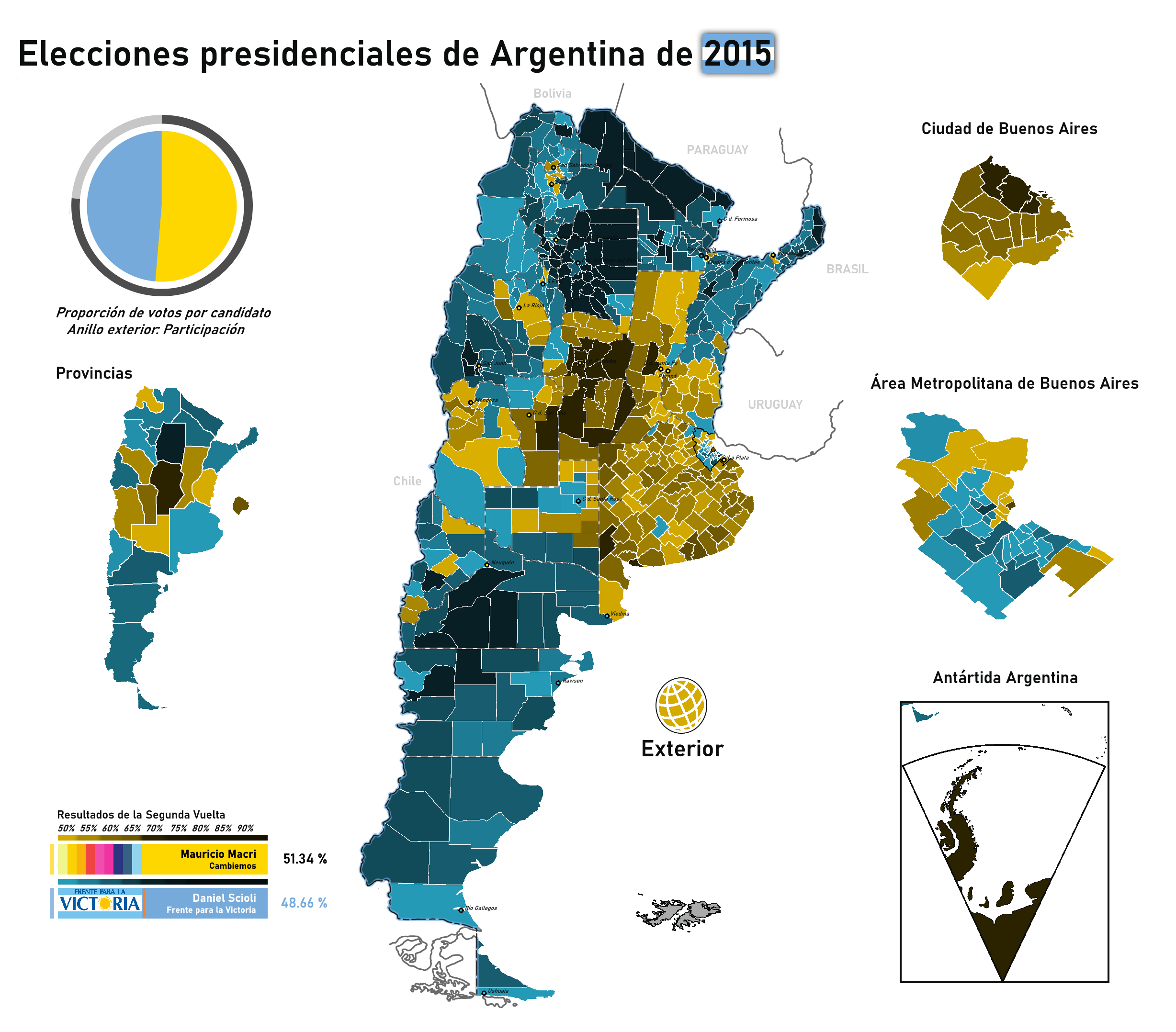
President before election
Cristina Fernández de Kirchner
FPV–PJ
Elected President
Mauricio Macri
Cambiemos–PRO
- Chamber of Deputies
- 25 October 2015
- 130 of the 257 seats in the Chamber of Deputies
- Turnout: 81.06%
| Party | Vote % | Seats |
|---|---|---|
| FPV-PJ | 37.39 | 60 |
| Cambiemos | 35.11 | 47 |
| United for a New Alternative | 17.56 | 17 |
| FIT – Unidad | 4.19 | 1 |
| Progresistas | 3.43 | 2 |
| CF | 1.17 | 2 |
| ChuSoTo | 0.37 | 1 |
This lists parties that won seats. See the complete results below.
- Senate
- 25 October 2015
- 24 of the 72 seats in the Senate
- Turnout: 79.83%
| Party | Vote % | Seats |
|---|---|---|
| Cambiemos | 38.81 | 9 |
| FPV-PJ | 32.72 | 13 |
| United for a New Alternative | 16.86 | 1 |
| ChuSoTo | 1.20 | 1 |
This lists parties that won seats. See the complete results below.
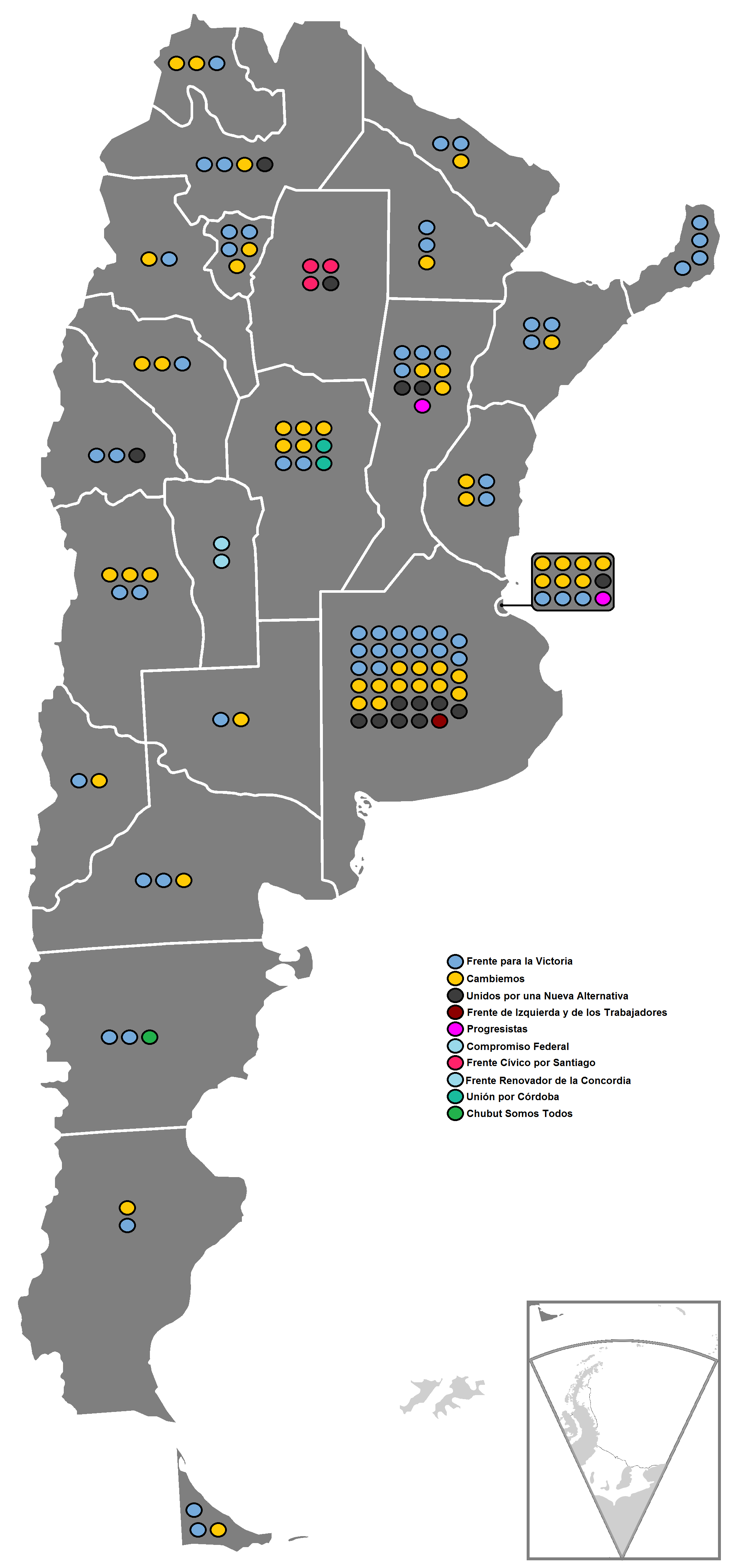
Chamber of Deputies results by province

General elections were held in Argentina on 25 October 2015 to elect the President and National Congress, and followed primary elections which were held on 9 August 2015. A second round of voting between the two leading candidates took place on 22 November, after surprisingly close results forced a runoff. On the first runoff voting ever held for an Argentine Presidential Election, Buenos Aires Mayor Mauricio Macri narrowly defeated Front for Victory candidate and Buenos Aires Province Governor Daniel Scioli with 51% of the vote. Macri's vote count of nearly 13 million votes made it the highest number of votes any candidate has ever received in Argentinian history until Javier Milei's victory in the 2023 presidential election. He took office on 10 December, making him the first freely elected president in almost a century who was not either a Radical or a Peronist.

Macri performed better among higher-income provinces in the central area of the country, while Scioli performed strongly in poorer provinces in the northwest, the northeast and Patagonia.

== Background ==
President Cristina Fernández de Kirchner was re-elected in 2011. As the Constitution of Argentina does not allow more than two consecutive terms, several politicians from the Front for Victory (FPV) speculated about a constitutional amendment to allow unlimited re-elections. This idea was heavily resisted by the opposition parties, and the FPV could not reach the required two-thirds majority in Congress. The mid-term elections in 2013 ended the FPV's hope for a constitutional amendment after they failed to win the necessary supermajority.

== Electoral system ==
The election of the president was carried out using the ballotage system, a modified version of the two-round system in which a candidate can win the presidency in the first round either by receiving 45% of the vote, or by receiving 40% of the vote and finishing at least 10 percentage points ahead of the second-place candidate. Voting is compulsory for citizens between 18 and 70 years old. Suffrage was also extended to 16- and 17-year-olds, though without compulsory voting.

There are a total of 257 seats of the Chamber of Deputies, elected from 24 electoral districts–the 23 provinces, plus the federal district of Buenos Aires, which its own executive and legislature and is represented in the national Congress like all other provinces. The number of seats are distributed in relation to the population of the province. In order to be in concordance with the "one-third female" law enforces that one-third of the overall seats in the Chamber of Deputies are female. The 130 seats of the Chamber of Deputies up for election were elected from 24 multi-member constituencies based on the 23 provinces and Buenos Aires. Seats were allocated using the D'Hondt method of proportional representation, with an electoral threshold of 3%.

The 24 seats in the Senate up for election were elected in three-seat constituencies using the closed list system. Each district is represented by three senatorial seats. Each party is allowed to register up to two candidates; one of those registered must be female. The party receiving the most votes wins two seats, and the second-placed party won one. The third senatorial seat was established in the Constitution of 1994 in order to better represent the largest minority in each district.

Parties and coalitions provided their own ballot papers, which voters placed in sealed envelopes. However, voters were able to cut ballot papers up and place different sections from different parties inside the envelope if they wanted to vote for different candidates or lists for different posts. Being under a Federal system, it is possible for different provinces to use different systems. In Buenos Aires and Salta electronic voting machines were used to print out a single unified ballot, with voters able to select different candidates and parties on a touch screen. Other municipalities such as Bariloche opted for a non-electronic single unified ballot. Opposition candidates, including Sergio Massa, Mauricio Macri and Margarita Stolbizer called for the nationwide implementation of a unified ballot and/or electronic voting, though Massa in particular was more cautious, saying it was more realistic for such a system to be implemented by 2017. The authority in charge of regulating elections rejected changing the system within 2015 since they claimed it would be too short term to implement the changes and explain to the public how the new system works.

== Candidates ==
=== General election ===
Six candidates received at least 1.5% of the vote in the primary elections and were able to contest the general election.

==== Cambiemos ====
Mauricio Macri, from the Republican Proposal, was the mayor of Buenos Aires city. Many smaller parties had created a coalition the previous year, the Broad Front UNEN. Elisa Carrió of the Civic Coalition left it to join Macri. An internal congress of the Radical Civic Union decided to do so as well, and proposing Ernesto Sanz as their precandidate. UNEN was thus disbanded, and the three candidates ran for the coalition Cambiemos. Margarita Stolbizer refused to join the coalition with Macri, and ran in a separate party instead.

Cambiemos
| Mauricio Macri | Gabriela Michetti |
| for President | for Vice President |
| 5th Chief of Government of Buenos Aires (2007–2015) | National Senator for Buenos Aires City (2013–2016) |
Parties in the coalition: Radical Civic Union; Democratic Progressive Party; Conservative People's Party; Civic Coalition ARI; Republican Proposal; Faith Party; Dialogue Party

==== Front for Victory ====
Initially, the FPV had several pre-candidates to the presidency, but only Daniel Scioli and Florencio Randazzo had a good reception in the opinion polls. Scioli was resisted by factions of the party that did not consider him truly loyal to Kirchner. All the minor candidates resigned when Kirchner asked them to do so. Randazzo resigned as well some weeks before the primary elections, leaving Scioli as the sole precandidate of the FPV. Randazzo did not accept to run for governor of the Buenos Aires province, which had primary elections between minister Aníbal Fernández and Julián Domínguez. Fernández won the local primary elections.

Front for Victory
| Daniel Scioli | Carlos Zannini |
| for President | for Vice President |
| Governor of Buenos Aires (2007–2015) | Legal and Technical Secretary of the Presidency (2003–2015) |
Parties in the coalition: Justicialist Party; Intransigent Party; Federal Party; Communist Party; Humanist Party; Broad Front Party; Victory Party; Solidary Party; Kolina; Encounter for Democracy and Equality; FORJA Concertation Party; HACER Front for Social Progress; Party for Popular Sovereignty

==== Other candidates ====
in alphabetical order

| Workers' Left Front | | United for a New Alternative | | Federal Commitment | | Progresistas | |
| Nicolás del Caño | Myriam Bregman | Sergio Massa | Gustavo Sáenz | Adolfo Rodríguez Saá | Liliana Negre de Alonso | Margarita Stolbizer | Miguel Ángel Olaviaga |
| for President | for Vice President | for President | for Vice President | for President | for Vice President | for President | for Vice President |
| National Deputy for Mendoza (2013–2015) | National Deputy for Buenos Aires (2015–2016) | National Deputy for Buenos Aires (2013–2017) | Mayor of Salta (2015–2019) | National Senator for San Luis (2005–present) | National Senator for San Luis (2001–2017) | National Deputy for Buenos Aires (1997–2005, 2009–2017) | Union leader of Asociación Mutual Mercantil Argentina |
| Parties in the coalition: Socialist Left; Workers' Party; Socialist Workers' Party | | Parties in the coalition: Integration and Development Movement; Christian Democratic Party; Popular Union; UNIR Constitutional Nationalist Party; Light Blue and White Union; Third Position Party; Federal Renewal Party; Commitment and Effort for Triumph; Workers' White Party; Jujuy Wins; New People; Salta Identity Party; Production and Labour; Civic Encounter; Union for Liberty; Authentic Renewal Front | | Parties in the coalition: Movimiento Independiente Justicia y Dignidad; Es Posible | | Parties in the coalition: Authentic Socialist Party; Freemen of the South Movement; Socialist Party; Generation for a National Encounter; Social Pole Movement | |

=== Primary elections ===
The candidates of five parties failed in their attempt at passing the 1.5% threshold in the primary elections that would have allowed them to run in the general election.

| Popular Front | | Movement for Socialism | | MST-Nueva Izquierda | | People's Party | | Neighbourhood Action Movement | |
| Víctor De Gennaro | Evangelina Codoni | Manuela Castañeira | Jorge Ayala | Alejandro Bodart | Vilma Ripoll | Mauricio Yattah | María Moretta | Raúl Albarracín | Gastón Dib |
| for President | for Vice President | for President | for Vice President | for President | for Vice President | for President | for Vice President | for President | for Vice President |
| Parties in the coalition: Popular Unity; Revolutionary Communist Party | | — | | Parties in the coalition: Workers' Socialist Movement; Nueva Izquierda | | — | | — | |

== Campaign and controversies ==
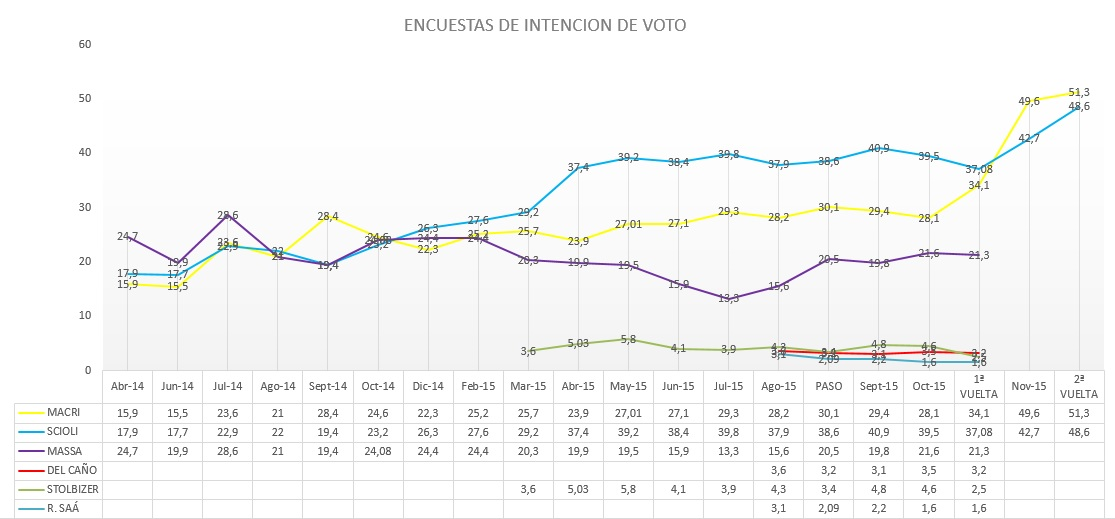
Opinion polls during the first round had underestimated the number of voters intending to vote for Macri, while later polls underestimated Scioli.

With Kirchner unable to run, three candidates led the opinion polls; Daniel Scioli, Sergio Massa and Mauricio Macri. Several controversies took place during the time of the elections, or related to the elections themselves.

The primary elections and some local elections had scandals of Electoral fraud. There was a frequent theft of ballot papers from the polling places. State-owned Correo Argentino collects the results of each school and sends them to a centralized location for their global count; there have been reports of inconsistencies between the results signed in the schools and those informed by Correo Argentino. Tucumán even had a case of people burning ballot boxes, which led to several demonstrations at Plaza Independencia. There was policial repression on those demonstrations, leading to further scandals.

Journalist Jorge Lanata aired an interview with a prisoner sentenced for the 2008 Triple crime, who claimed that Aníbal Fernández was the mastermind of that crime. This increased the tensions between Fernández and Domínguez, as Fernández considered that Domínguez helped Lanata somehow. Scioli stayed away from both precandidates to governor in the last week before the primary elections, which were won by Fernández.

Ariel Velázquez, a sympathizer of the Radical Civic Union, was shot in his house in Jujuy, after taking part in the political campaign. He died two weeks later, and the Tupac Amaru organization (led by Kirchnerite Milagro Sala) was blamed for it. President Cristina Kirchner claimed that he was not a Radical, which was refuted by his family.

Several cities in the Buenos Aires Province suffered big floods during the primary elections, and the following week. The flood affected 10,000 people. Daniel Scioli had left to Italy at that moment, and made a rushed return. Mauricio Macri considered it a result of poor urban planning under Scioli's provincial government, and compared it with the lack of flooding in Buenos Aires during the same storm, which had undergone flood prevention works under his leadership. Scioli accused users of social networks to plot to damage his public image, and claimed that he has all of them identified.

Vote buying is also a common tool utilized in Argentine elections. As for this election, the director for the Center for Research and Social Action, Rodrigo Zarazaga stated, “Vote buying strategies will probably sway 5 to 12 percent of Argentine voters on Sunday.” An example of vote buying during this election took place in Buenos Aires. Voters in this area were given the option to vote for particular candidates during the municipal elections in Tucumán. The Argentine citizens that actually promised had received “sacks stuffed with bottles of cooking oil, pasta and flour.”

== Results ==
=== Primary elections ===
Open primary elections for the Presidency were held nationwide on 9 August 2015. With this system, all parties run primary elections on a single ballot. All parties must take part in it, both the parties with internal factions and parties with a single candidate list. Citizens may vote for any candidate of any party, but may only cast a single vote. The most voted candidate of parties gaining 1.5% or higher of the valid votes advances to the general election.

Scioli led the field with 38.41% of the vote, nearly 8 percentage points ahead of Macri; both figures would have placed him close to the threshold for avoiding a ballotage. Sergio Massa finished third. Both Macri and Massa easily defeated their rivals in the primary elections; Scioli, Stolbizer and Rodríguez Saá were the single candidates of their respective parties. Nicolás del Caño defeated Altamira, and became the unexpected candidate for the Worker's Left Front.

| Party | Presidential candidate | Running mate | Candidate votes | | Overall votes | |
| Party | Presidential candidate | Running mate | Votes | % | Votes | % |
|---|---|---|---|---|---|---|
| Front for Victory (FPV) | Daniel Scioli | Carlos Zannini | 8,720,573 | 100 | 8,720,573 | 36.69 |
| Let's Change | Mauricio Macri | Gabriela Michetti | 5,523,413 | 81.33 | 6,791,278 | 28.57 |
| Let's Change | Ernesto Sanz | Lucas Llach | 753,825 | 11.10 | 6,791,278 | 28.57 |
| Let's Change | Elisa Carrió | Héctor Toty Flores | 514,040 | 7.57 | 6,791,278 | 28.57 |
| United for a New Alternative (UNA) | Sergio Massa | Gustavo Sáenz | 3,230,887 | 69.64 | 4,639,405 | 19.52 |
| United for a New Alternative (UNA) | José Manuel de la Sota | Claudia Rucci | 1,408,518 | 30.36 | 4,639,405 | 19.52 |
| Progressives | Margarita Stolbizer | Miguel Ángel Olaviaga | 769,316 | 100 | 781,472 | 3.29 |
| Left and Worker's Front (FIT) | Nicolás del Caño | Myriam Bregman | 375,874 | 51.29 | 732,851 | 3.08 |
| Left and Worker's Front (FIT) | Jorge Altamira | Juan Carlos Giordano | 356,977 | 48.71 | 732,851 | 3.08 |
| Federal Commitment | Adolfo Rodríguez Saá | Liliana Negre de Alonso | 472,341 | 100 | 472,341 | 1.99 |
| People's Front | Víctor De Gennaro | Evangelina Codoni | 106,324 | 100 | 106,324 | 0.45 |
| Movement for Socialism (MAS) | Manuela Castañeira | Jorge Ayala | 103,742 | 100 | 103,742 | 0.44 |
| Workers' Socialist Movement - New Left | Alejandro Bodart | Vilma Ripoll | 95,780 | 100 | 95,780 | 0.40 |
| Popular Party | Mauricio Yattah | María Moretta | 67,798 | 100 | 67,798 | 0.29 |
| Neighbourhood Action Movement (MAV) | Raúl Albarracín | Gastón Dib | 39,512 | 100 | 39,512 | 0.17 |
| Blank votes | | | | | 1,216,634 | 5.12 |
| Total | | | | | 23,767,710 | 100 |
| Valid votes | | | | | 23,767,710 | 98.94 |
| Invalid votes | | | | | 254,106 | 1.06 |
| Total votes | | | | | 24,021,816 | 100 |
| Registered voters/turnout | | | | | 32,067,641 | 74.91 |

=== President ===
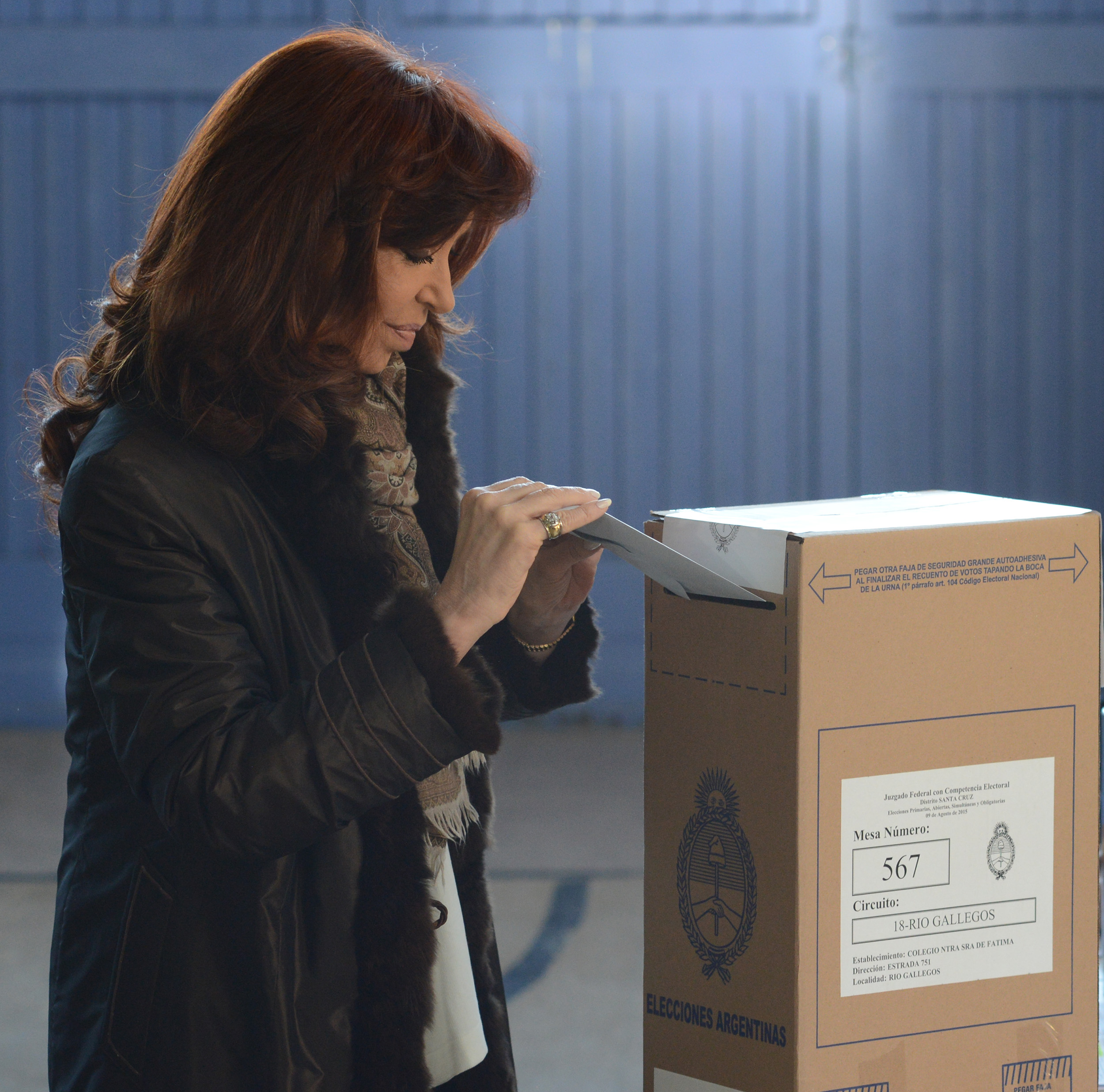
Then-president Cristina Fernández de Kirchner casting her vote.

Opinion polls previous to the result suggested that Scioli would win by a wide margin, and might even be able to avoid a ballotage. However, the final results showed only a narrow lead for Scioli, with his 37% just ahead of Macri's 34%, leading to a runoff on 22 November. Massa finished third with 21% of the vote and both remaining candidates sought to secure the backing of Massa's voters. Both candidates were polarized on the opinion about the presidency of Cristina Kirchner: Scioli proposed to keep most of the Kirchnerite policies, and Macri to change them. In the legislative elections, the FPV lost the majority of the Chamber of Deputies, but kept the majority of the Senate.

Scioli declined to attend the first leaders' debate previous to the elections, which was held between the other five candidates instead. When the ballotage was confirmed, he asked Macri for a presidential debate between both candidates, which was accepted. Two debates were being organized: one by the NGO "Argentina debate", and another one by the TV news channel Todo Noticias. Macri preferred to take part in a single debate with Scioli, and opted for the one organized by Argentina Debate.

Macri criticized Scioli for a negative campaigning launched by the Front for Victory. Several politicians and state institutions run by the FPV released messages warning about terrible things that may happen if Macri was elected president. Scioli claims that it was a campaign to encourage public awareness. It is rumored that the campaign may have been suggested by the Brazilian João Santana, who organized a similar one in Brazil during the ballotage of Dilma Rousseff and Aécio Neves.

The ballotage was held on 22 November. Daniel Scioli accepted his defeat when 70% of the votes were counted; the provisional results were 53% and 47% at that moment. The distance between both candidates slowly narrowed in the following hours, leading to a smaller victory margin for Macri than most exit polls suggested. Nevertheless, his victory ended the 12-year rule of Kirchnerism in the country.

Macri owed his victory to Córdoba, the second-largest province, swinging dramatically to support him; he carried the province by over 930,000 votes in the second round, far exceeding his nationwide margin of 680,600 votes. Buenos Aires also swung hard to Macri, giving its mayor over 64 percent of the vote in the second round.

| Candidate | Running mate | Party | First round | | Second round | |
| Candidate | Running mate | Party | Votes | % | Votes | % |
|---|---|---|---|---|---|---|
| Mauricio Macri | Gabriela Michetti | Cambiemos | 8,601,131 | 34.15 | 12,988,349 | 51.34 |
| Daniel Scioli | Carlos Zannini | Front for Victory | 9,338,490 | 37.08 | 12,309,575 | 48.66 |
| Sergio Massa | Gustavo Sáenz | United for a New Alternative | 5,386,977 | 21.39 | | |
| Nicolás del Caño | Myriam Bregman | Workers' Left Front | 812,530 | 3.23 | | |
| Margarita Stolbizer | Miguel Ángel Olaviaga | Progresistas | 632,551 | 2.51 | | |
| Adolfo Rodríguez Saá | Liliana Negre de Alonso | Federal Commitment | 412,578 | 1.64 | | |
| Total | | | 25,184,257 | 100.00 | 25,297,924 | 100.00 |
| Valid votes | | | 25,184,257 | 96.68 | 25,297,924 | 97.54 |
| Invalid votes | | | 199,449 | 0.77 | 330,848 | 1.28 |
| Blank votes | | | 664,740 | 2.55 | 306,471 | 1.18 |
| Total votes | | | 26,048,446 | 100.00 | 25,935,243 | 100.00 |
| Registered voters/turnout | | | 32,130,853 | 81.07 | 32,108,509 | 80.77 |
Source: Government of Argentina, Padron

==== Results by province, first round ====
Provinces won by Daniel Scioli
Provinces won by Mauricio Macri
Provinces won by Sergio Massa
Provinces won by Adolfo Rodríguez Saá

| | Daniel Scioli FPV | | Mauricio Macri PRO | | Sergio Massa FR | | Nicolas del Caño FIT | | Margarita Stolbizer Progresistas | | Adolfo Rodríguez Saá CF | | Margin | | Province total |
| Province | Votes | % | Votes | % | Votes | % | Votes | % | Votes | % | Votes | % | Votes | % | Votes |
|---|---|---|---|---|---|---|---|---|---|---|---|---|---|---|---|
| Buenos Aires | 3,563,089 | 37.28 | 3,134,779 | 32.80 | 2,143,827 | 22.43 | 351,786 | 3.68 | 272,801 | 2.85 | 90,448 | 0.95 | 428,310 | 4.48 | 9,556,730 |
| Capital Federal | 476,632 | 24.09 | 1,001,379 | 50.61 | 302,065 | 15.27 | 84,238 | 4.26 | 100,462 | 5.08 | 13,856 | 0.70 | -524,747 | -26.52 | 1,978,632 |
| Catamarca | 98,831 | 44.84 | 78,958 | 35.82 | 35,046 | 15.90 | 3,447 | 1.56 | 2,419 | 1.10 | 1,718 | 0.78 | 19,873 | 9.02 | 220,419 |
| Chaco | 352,304 | 53.69 | 185,563 | 28.28 | 97,469 | 14.85 | 9,315 | 1.42 | 6,990 | 1.07 | 4,509 | 0.69 | 166,741 | 25.41 | 656,150 |
| Chubut | 121,314 | 41.67 | 62,142 | 21.34 | 86,026 | 29.55 | 10,439 | 3.59 | 8,466 | 2.91 | 2,749 | 0.94 | 35,288 | 12.12 | 291,136 |
| Córdoba | 418,221 | 19.26 | 1,155,333 | 53.22 | 443,204 | 20.41 | 69,051 | 3.18 | 38,998 | 1.80 | 46,235 | 2.13 | -712,129 | -32.81 | 2,171,042 |
| Corrientes | 313,292 | 50.26 | 198,241 | 31.81 | 95,106 | 15.26 | 6,824 | 1.09 | 6,487 | 1.04 | 3,342 | 0.54 | 115,051 | 18.45 | 623,292 |
| Entre Ríos | 313,022 | 37.64 | 314,057 | 37.76 | 164,799 | 19.81 | 14,420 | 1.73 | 17,501 | 2.10 | 7,925 | 0.95 | -1,035 | -0.12 | 831,724 |
| Formosa | 217,026 | 66.98 | 48,742 | 15.04 | 53,817 | 16.61 | 2,615 | 0.81 | 1,116 | 0.34 | 696 | 0.21 | 163,209 | 50.94 | 324,012 |
| Jujuy | 152,345 | 37.58 | 69,882 | 17.24 | 168,571 | 41.59 | 9,564 | 2.36 | 3,144 | 0.78 | 1,846 | 0.46 | -16,226 | -4.01 | 405,352 |
| La Pampa | 79,963 | 37.94 | 70,783 | 33.59 | 45,465 | 21.57 | 5,332 | 2.53 | 5,509 | 2.61 | 3,704 | 1.76 | 9,180 | 4.35 | 210,756 |
| La Rioja | 73,527 | 36.32 | 64,106 | 31.67 | 52,492 | 25.93 | 3,403 | 1.68 | 2,199 | 1.09 | 6,706 | 3.31 | 9,421 | 4.65 | 202,433 |
| Mendoza | 341,163 | 31.36 | 443,913 | 40.81 | 156,503 | 14.39 | 82,734 | 7.61 | 15,698 | 1.44 | 47,874 | 4.40 | -102,750 | -9.45 | 1,087,885 |
| Misiones | 403,671 | 61.11 | 149,940 | 22.70 | 90,464 | 13.70 | 5,809 | 0.88 | 8,244 | 1.25 | 2,392 | 0.36 | 253,731 | 48.41 | 660,520 |
| Neuquén | 132,691 | 35.74 | 103,860 | 27.97 | 98,061 | 26.41 | 20,055 | 5.40 | 9,883 | 2.66 | 6,745 | 1.82 | 28,831 | 7.77 | 371,295 |
| Río Negro | 179,872 | 45.20 | 89,103 | 22.39 | 96,769 | 24.32 | 15,506 | 3.90 | 11,119 | 2.79 | 5,604 | 1.41 | 83,103 | 20.88 | 397,973 |
| Salta | 292,699 | 40.98 | 146,875 | 20.56 | 242,704 | 33.98 | 19,036 | 2.66 | 7,506 | 1.05 | 5,498 | 0.77 | 49,995 | 7.00 | 714,318 |
| San Juan | 192,377 | 45.96 | 86,920 | 20.76 | 111,444 | 26.62 | 6,127 | 1.46 | 7,264 | 1.74 | 14,470 | 3.46 | 80,933 | 19.34 | 418,602 |
| San Luis | 43,442 | 15.58 | 86,225 | 30.93 | 37,810 | 13.56 | 4,947 | 1.77 | 3,702 | 1.33 | 102,684 | 36.83 | -16,459 | -5.90 | 278,810 |
| Santa Cruz | 82,595 | 47.06 | 44,880 | 25.57 | 39,626 | 22.58 | 5,533 | 3.15 | 2,064 | 1.18 | 794 | 0.45 | 37,715 | 21.49 | 175,492 |
| Santa Fe | 640,924 | 31.77 | 712,100 | 35.29 | 500,897 | 24.83 | 53,801 | 2.67 | 79,721 | 3.95 | 30,168 | 1.50 | 71,176 | -3.52 | 2,017,611 |
| Santiago del Estero | 351,388 | 63.13 | 81,825 | 14.70 | 107,427 | 19.30 | 8,099 | 1.46 | 5,268 | 0.95 | 2,595 | 0.47 | 243,961 | 43.83 | 556,602 |
| Tierra del Fuego | 42,049 | 45.52 | 20,226 | 21.90 | 21,601 | 23.39 | 4,055 | 4.39 | 2,978 | 3.22 | 1,458 | 1.58 | 20,448 | 22.13 | 92,367 |
| Tucumán | 456,053 | 48.46 | 251,299 | 26.70 | 195,784 | 20.80 | 16,394 | 1.74 | 13,012 | 1.38 | 8,562 | 0.91 | 204,754 | 21.76 | 941,104 |
| Totals | 9,338,490 | 37.08 | 8,601,131 | 34.15 | 5,386,977 | 21.39 | 812,530 | 3.23 | 632.551 | 2.51 | 412,578 | 1.64 | 737,359 | 2.93 | 25,184,257 |

==== Results by province, second round ====
Provinces won by Daniel Scioli
Provinces won by Mauricio Macri

| | Mauricio Macri PRO | | Daniel Scioli FPV | | Margin | | Province total |
| Province | Votes | % | Votes | % | Votes | % | Votes |
|---|---|---|---|---|---|---|---|
| Buenos Aires | 4,662,935 | 48.85 | 4,882,082 | 51.15 | -219,147 | -2.30 | 9,545,017 |
| Capital Federal | 1,258,151 | 64.80 | 683,545 | 35.20 | 574,606 | 29.60 | 1,941,696 |
| Catamarca | 102,440 | 46.86 | 116,158 | 53.14 | -13,718 | -6.28 | 218,598 |
| Chaco | 278,001 | 40.81 | 403,280 | 59.19 | -125,279 | -18.38 | 681,281 |
| Chubut | 130,163 | 41.15 | 186,155 | 58.85 | -55,992 | -17.70 | 316,318 |
| Córdoba | 1,546,831 | 71.52 | 616,002 | 28.48 | 930,829 | 43.04 | 2,162,833 |
| Corrientes | 286,345 | 44.64 | 355,119 | 55.36 | -68,774 | -10.72 | 641,464 |
| Entre Ríos | 453,149 | 53.86 | 388,219 | 46.14 | 64,930 | 7.72 | 841,368 |
| Formosa | 116,725 | 36.08 | 206,762 | 63.92 | -90,037 | -27.84 | 323,487 |
| Jujuy | 214,429 | 52.89 | 190,959 | 47.11 | 23,470 | 5.78 | 405,388 |
| La Pampa | 108,543 | 51.03 | 104,169 | 48.97 | 4,374 | 2.06 | 212,712 |
| La Rioja | 114,963 | 56.50 | 88,502 | 43.50 | 16,461 | 13.00 | 203,465 |
| Mendoza | 625,983 | 57.53 | 462,186 | 42.47 | 163,797 | 15.06 | 1,088,169 |
| Misiones | 280,762 | 41.93 | 388,910 | 58.07 | -108,148 | -16.14 | 669,672 |
| Neuquén | 177,935 | 47.15 | 199,425 | 52.85 | -21,490 | -5.70 | 377,360 |
| Río Negro | 148,087 | 37.14 | 250,621 | 62.86 | -102,534 | -25.72 | 398,708 |
| Salta | 323,818 | 44.77 | 399,518 | 55.23 | -75,700 | -10.46 | 723,336 |
| San Juan | 175,377 | 40.20 | 260,937 | 59.80 | -85,560 | -19.60 | 463,314 |
| San Luis | 178,156 | 64.13 | 99,667 | 35.87 | 78,489 | 28.26 | 277,823 |
| Santa Cruz | 72,876 | 41.67 | 102,003 | 58.33 | -29,127 | -16.66 | 174,879 |
| Santa Fe | 1,141,121 | 55.72 | 906,826 | 44.28 | 234,295 | 11.44 | 2,047,947 |
| Santiago del Estero | 154,955 | 27.91 | 400,331 | 72.09 | -245,376 | -44.18 | 555,286 |
| Tierra del Fuego | 38,407 | 41.34 | 54,503 | 58.66 | -16,096 | -17.32 | 92,910 |
| Tucumán | 398,197 | 41.40 | 563,696 | 58.60 | -165,499 | -17.20 | 961,893 |
| Totals | 12,988,349 | 51.34 | 12,309,575 | 48.66 | 678,774 | 2.68 | 25,297,924 |

=== Chamber of Deputies ===
| Party or alliance | | Votes | % | Seats |
| Party or alliance | | Votes | % | Won |
|---|---|---|---|---|
| Front for Victory | | 8,765,438 | 37.39 | 60 |
| Cambiemos | Cambiemos | 7,689,257 | 32.80 | 42 |
| Cambiemos | Encuentro por Corrientes | 183,856 | 0.78 | 1 |
| Cambiemos | Formosan Broad Front | 82,095 | 0.35 | 1 |
| Cambiemos | Civic and Social Front of Catamarca | 77,507 | 0.33 | 1 |
| Cambiemos | Union to Live Better | 75,019 | 0.32 | 1 |
| Cambiemos | La Pampa Civic and Social Front | 69,666 | 0.30 | 1 |
| Cambiemos | Radical Civic Union | 53,205 | 0.23 | 0 |
| Cambiemos | Total | 8,230,605 | 35.11 | 47 |
| United for a New Alternative | United for a New Alternative | 3,167,902 | 13.51 | 14 |
| United for a New Alternative | Union for Córdoba | 449,656 | 1.92 | 2 |
| United for a New Alternative | Renewal Front | 149,596 | 0.64 | 0 |
| United for a New Alternative | Commitment with San Juan | 105,267 | 0.45 | 1 |
| United for a New Alternative | Citizen Participation Movement | 99,280 | 0.42 | 0 |
| United for a New Alternative | Popular Union | 61,146 | 0.26 | 0 |
| United for a New Alternative | United Front | 44,065 | 0.19 | 0 |
| United for a New Alternative | New People | 20,965 | 0.09 | 0 |
| United for a New Alternative | Third Position Front | 17,949 | 0.08 | 0 |
| United for a New Alternative | Total | 4,115,826 | 17.56 | 17 |
| Workers' Left Front | Workers' Left Front | 904,229 | 3.86 | 1 |
| Workers' Left Front | Workers' Party | 78,724 | 0.34 | 0 |
| Workers' Left Front | Total | 982,953 | 4.19 | 1 |
| Progresistas | Progresistas | 568,056 | 2.42 | 1 |
| Progresistas | Progressive, Civic and Social Front | 208,242 | 0.89 | 1 |
| Progresistas | Socialist Party | 14,922 | 0.06 | 0 |
| Progresistas | Social Pole Movement | 8,303 | 0.04 | 0 |
| Progresistas | Generation for a National Encounter | 4,087 | 0.02 | 0 |
| Progresistas | Total | 803,610 | 3.43 | 2 |
| Federal Commitment | Federal Commitment | 174,795 | 0.75 | 2 |
| Federal Commitment | Partido Es Posible | 100,252 | 0.43 | 0 |
| Federal Commitment | Total | 275,047 | 1.17 | 2 |
| We Are All Chubut | | 85,730 | 0.37 | 1 |
| Self-determination and Freedom | | 68,248 | 0.29 | 0 |
| Neuquén People's Movement | | 56,315 | 0.24 | 0 |
| Popular Project | | 30,734 | 0.13 | 0 |
| Renewal Crusade | | 7,442 | 0.03 | 0 |
| Fuegian People's Movement | | 5,608 | 0.02 | 0 |
| Communist Party | | 4,622 | 0.02 | 0 |
| Party of Culture, Education and Labour | | 3,681 | 0.02 | 0 |
| Citizens to Govern Party | | 2,864 | 0.01 | 0 |
| Patagonian Social Party | | 2,832 | 0.01 | 0 |
| New October | | 1,107 | 0.00 | 0 |
| Total | | 23,442,662 | 100.00 | 130 |
| Valid votes | | 23,442,662 | 90.00 | |
| Invalid votes | | 185,268 | 0.71 | |
| Blank votes | | 2,418,716 | 9.29 | |
| Total votes | | 26,046,646 | 100.00 | |
| Registered voters/turnout | | 32,130,853 | 81.06 | |
Source: DINE, Padron

==== Results by province ====
| Province | FPV | | | Let's Change | | | UNA | | | Others | | |
| Province | Votes | % | Seats | Votes | % | Seats | Votes | % | Seats | Votes | % | Seats |
|---|---|---|---|---|---|---|---|---|---|---|---|---|
| Buenos Aires | 3,354,619 | 37.28 | 14 | 3,037,552 | 33.75 | 12 | 1,888,415 | 20.98 | 8 | 718,984 | 7.99 | 1 |
| Buenos Aires City | 437,380 | 22.37 | 3 | 895,391 | 45.80 | 6 | 280,213 | 14.33 | 2 | 342,012 | 17.49 | 1 |
| Catamarca | 97,349 | 50.49 | 1 | 77,507 | 40.20 | 1 | 17,949 | 9.31 | — | — | — | — |
| Chaco | 343,023 | 53.75 | 2 | 179,386 | 28.11 | 1 | 92,247 | 14.46 | — | 23,487 | 3.68 | — |
| Chubut | 103,460 | 42.44 | 2 | 46,281 | 18.99 | — | — | — | — | 94,033 | 38.57 | 1 |
| Córdoba | 385,387 | 18.10 | 2 | 1,061,135 | 49.83 | 5 | 449,656 | 21.12 | 2 | 233,240 | 10.95 | — |
| Corrientes | 292,296 | 51.97 | 3 | 183,856 | 32.69 | 1 | 86,282 | 15.34 | — | — | — | — |
| Entre Ríos | 308,742 | 42.30 | 2 | 300,024 | 41.11 | 2 | 121,085 | 16.59 | — | — | — | — |
| Formosa | 219,585 | 72.79 | 2 | 82,095 | 27.21 | 1 | — | — | — | — | — | — |
| Jujuy | 128,738 | 37.75 | 1 | 194,051 | 56.90 | 2 | — | — | — | 18,242 | 5.35 | — |
| La Pampa | 81,040 | 46.11 | 1 | 69,666 | 39.64 | 1 | 20,965 | 11.93 | — | 4,087 | 2.33 | — |
| La Rioja | 73,487 | 41.46 | 1 | 90,900 | 51.29 | 2 | — | — | — | 12,845 | 7.25 | — |
| Mendoza | 315,587 | 29.97 | 2 | 434,058 | 41.22 | 3 | 135,622 | 12.88 | — | 167,870 | 15.94 | — |
| Misiones | 391,913 | 65.98 | 4 | 126,136 | 21.24 | — | 44,065 | 7.42 | — | 31,841 | 5.36 | — |
| Neuquén | 97,301 | 28.67 | 1 | 85,246 | 25.11 | 1 | 61,146 | 18.01 | — | 95,743 | 28.21 | — |
| Río Negro | 161,690 | 57.74 | 2 | 85,076 | 30.38 | 1 | — | — | — | 33,286 | 11.89 | — |
| Salta | 273,989 | 41.78 | 2 | 154,755 | 23.60 | 1 | 184,185 | 28.09 | 1 | 42,868 | 6.54 | — |
| San Juan | 214,238 | 55.40 | 2 | 59,789 | 15.46 | — | 105,267 | 27.22 | 1 | 7,442 | 1.92 | — |
| San Luis | 32,397 | 13.65 | — | 54,321 | 22.89 | — | — | — | — | 150,616 | 63.46 | 2 |
| Santa Cruz | 70,603 | 46.30 | 1 | 75,019 | 49.19 | 1 | — | — | — | 6,879 | 4.51 | — |
| Santa Fe | 595,616 | 31.46 | 4 | 576,749 | 30.47 | 3 | 415,889 | 21.97 | 2 | 304,738 | 16.10 | 1 |
| Santiago del Estero | 341,207 | 65.67 | 3 | 78,758 | 15.16 | — | 99,586 | 19.17 | 1 | — | — | — |
| Tierra del Fuego | 32,869 | 42.01 | 2 | 14,557 | 18.61 | 1 | 13,974 | 17.86 | — | 16,835 | 21.52 | — |
| Tucumán | 412,922 | 51.22 | 3 | 268,297 | 33.28 | 2 | 99,280 | 12.31 | — | 25,745 | 3.19 | — |
| Total | 8,765,438 | 37.39 | 60 | 8,230,605 | 35.11 | 47 | 4,115,826 | 17.56 | 17 | 2,330,793 | 9.94 | 6 |

=== Senate ===
| Party or alliance | | Votes | % | Seats |
| Party or alliance | | Votes | % | Won |
|---|---|---|---|---|
| Cambiemos | Cambiemos | 2,436,874 | 34.14 | 6 |
| Cambiemos | Encuentro por Corrientes | 186,462 | 2.61 | 1 |
| Cambiemos | Civic and Social Front of Catamarca | 77,091 | 1.08 | 1 |
| Cambiemos | La Pampa Civic and Social Front | 69,983 | 0.98 | 1 |
| Cambiemos | Total | 2,770,410 | 38.81 | 9 |
| Front for Victory | | 2,336,037 | 32.72 | 13 |
| United for a New Alternative | United for a New Alternative | 480,703 | 6.73 | 0 |
| United for a New Alternative | Union for Córdoba | 449,244 | 6.29 | 1 |
| United for a New Alternative | Renewal Front | 134,403 | 1.88 | 0 |
| United for a New Alternative | Citizen Participation Movement | 99,582 | 1.40 | 0 |
| United for a New Alternative | New People | 21,494 | 0.30 | 0 |
| United for a New Alternative | Third Position Front | 18,283 | 0.26 | 0 |
| United for a New Alternative | Total | 1,203,709 | 16.86 | 1 |
| Progresistas | Progressive, Civic and Social Front | 249,246 | 3.49 | 0 |
| Progresistas | Progresistas | 62,764 | 0.88 | 0 |
| Progresistas | Social Pole Movement | 8,351 | 0.12 | 0 |
| Progresistas | Generation for a National Encounter | 4,275 | 0.06 | 0 |
| Progresistas | Total | 324,636 | 4.55 | 0 |
| Workers' Left Front | | 302,525 | 4.24 | 0 |
| Federal Commitment | Partido Es Posible | 91,858 | 1.29 | 0 |
| Federal Commitment | Federal Commitment | 23,904 | 0.33 | 0 |
| Federal Commitment | Total | 115,762 | 1.62 | 0 |
| We Are All Chubut | | 85,396 | 1.20 | 1 |
| Total | | 7,138,475 | 100.00 | 24 |
| Valid votes | | 7,138,475 | 91.10 | |
| Invalid votes | | 75,400 | 0.96 | |
| Blank votes | | 621,928 | 7.94 | |
| Total votes | | 7,835,803 | 100.00 | |
| Registered voters/turnout | | 9,815,549 | 79.83 | |
Source: DINE, Padron

==== Results by province ====
| Province | FPV | | | Let's Change | | | UNA | | | Others | | |
| Province | Votes | % | Seats | Votes | % | Seats | Votes | % | Seats | Votes | % | Seats |
|---|---|---|---|---|---|---|---|---|---|---|---|---|
| Catamarca | 97,872 | 50.65 | 2 | 77,091 | 39.89 | 1 | 18,283 | 9.46 | — | — | — | — |
| Chubut | 103,830 | 42.51 | 2 | 46,664 | 19.11 | — | — | — | — | 93,747 | 38.38 | 1 |
| Córdoba | 388,712 | 18.27 | — | 1,068,903 | 50.23 | 2 | 449,244 | 21.11 | 1 | 221,187 | 10.39 | — |
| Corrientes | 302,495 | 53.01 | 2 | 186,462 | 32.67 | 1 | 81,723 | 14.32 | — | — | — | — |
| La Pampa | 81,064 | 45.85 | 2 | 69,983 | 39.58 | 1 | 21,494 | 12.16 | — | 4,275 | 2.42 | — |
| Mendoza | 322,569 | 30.53 | 1 | 452,990 | 42.87 | 2 | 134,403 | 12.72 | — | 146,686 | 13.88 | — |
| Santa Fe | 616,146 | 32.00 | 2 | 570,060 | 29.61 | 1 | 398,980 | 20.72 | — | 339,982 | 17.66 | — |
| Tucumán | 423,349 | 50.18 | 2 | 298,257 | 35.35 | 1 | 99,582 | 11.80 | — | 22,442 | 2.66 | — |
| Total | 2,336,037 | 32.72 | 13 | 2,770,410 | 38.81 | 9 | 1,203,709 | 16.86 | 1 | 828,319 | 11.60 | 1 |

=== Mercosur Parliament ===
| Party | National | | | Provincial | | | Total seats |
| Party | Votes | % | Seats | Votes | % | Seats | Total seats |
|---|---|---|---|---|---|---|---|
| Front for Victory | 8,922,609 | 37.46 | 8 | 8,653,633 | 37.58 | 18 | 26 |
| Cambienos | 8,105,307 | 34.03 | 7 | 8,132,741 | 35.32 | 5 | 12 |
| United for a New Alternative | 4,723,218 | 19.83 | 4 | 4,004,348 | 17.39 | 0 | 4 |
| Workers' Left Front | 930,838 | 3.91 | 0 | 943,972 | 4.10 | 0 | 0 |
| Progresistas | 726,699 | 3.05 | 0 | 738,934 | 3.21 | 0 | 0 |
| Federal Commitment | 409,094 | 1.72 | 0 | 249,134 | 1.08 | 1 | 1 |
| We Are All Chubut | | | | 85,694 | 0.37 | 0 | 0 |
| Self-determination and Freedom | | | | 60,073 | 0.26 | 0 | 0 |
| Neuquén People's Movement | | | | 53,084 | 0.23 | 0 | 0 |
| Radical Civic Union | | | | 52,287 | 0.23 | 0 | 0 |
| Popular Project | | | | 30,902 | 0.13 | 0 | 0 |
| Fuegian People's Movement | | | | 4,555 | 0.02 | 0 | 0 |
| Party of Culture, Education and Labour | | | | 4,191 | 0.02 | 0 | 0 |
| Communist Party | | | | 4,051 | 0.02 | 0 | 0 |
| Patagonian Social Party | | | | 3,319 | 0.01 | 0 | 0 |
| Citizens let's Govern Party | | | | 2,764 | 0.01 | 0 | 0 |
| New October | | | | 1,016 | 0.00 | 0 | 0 |
| Total | 23,817,765 | 100.00 | 19 | 23,024,698 | 100.00 | 24 | 43 |
| Valid votes | 23,817,765 | 91.44 | | 23,024,698 | 88.40 | | |
| Invalid votes | 191,145 | 0.73 | | 185,502 | 0.71 | | |
| Blank votes | 2,039,605 | 7.83 | | 2,836,446 | 10.89 | | |
| Total votes | 26,048,515 | 100.00 | | 26,046,646 | 100.00 | | |
| Registered voters/turnout | 32,130,853 | 81.07 | | 32,130,853 | 81.06 | | |
Source: Government of Argentina

=== Provincial governors ===
On 25 October elections numerous provinces also elected governors, with the new ones beginning their terms on 10 December 2015. These provinces were Buenos Aires province, Catamarca, Chubut, Entre Ríos, Formosa, Jujuy, La Pampa, Misiones, San Juan, San Luis and Santa Cruz, encompassing 11 of the country's 23 provinces. The other provinces elected governors in different days of 2015; the only exceptions were Corrientes and Santiago del Estero whose governors' terms were not due to finish in 2015.

María Eugenia Vidal was elected governor of the populous Buenos Aires Province, defeating the controversial Aníbal Fernández; her victory influenced as well the growth of Macri in the presidential elections. Similarly, the unpopular Fernández may have subtracted non-Kirchnerite votes from Scioli. The victory was considered significant given that Fernández was the incumbent Cabinet Chief of the Kirchner administration, and that Vidal was directly replacing Daniel Scioli's post as governor of the province. It is made more significant as she is the first female governor of the province, and the first non-Peronist governor since 1987. The Republican Proposal also retained the city of Buenos Aires, that elected Horacio Rodríguez Larreta as the new mayor. The PRO stronghold had gone to a second round between Larreta and Martín Lousteau (also of the Cambiemos front, but not in the same party) after the Front for Victory's Mariano Recalde finished third. Juan Schiaretti won the elections in Córdoba, and he is the single governor of the UNA ticket. The socialist Miguel Lifschitz was elected governor of Santa Fe, after a controversial triple tie with the PJ and PRO. Carlos Verna was reelected governor of La Pampa.

The votes in Entre Ríos had a slow count. During a week, the provisional results suggested that Gustavo Bordet may be the new governor of Entre Ríos, but Alfredo de Angeli claimed that the uncounted votes may turn the tide and make him the winner instead. The final results were released on 30 October, confirming the victory of Bordet. In Misiones, Hugo Passalacqua, vice governor of Maurice Closs was elected governor by a wide margin.

Rosana Bertone was elected governor of Tierra del Fuego. The radical Eduardo Costa got the higher number of votes in Santa Cruz, but Alicia Kirchner was elected governor, thanks to the Ley de Lemas. The former governor of Chubut Mario Das Neves was elected again. Neuquén and Río Negro elected Omar Gutiérrez and Alberto Weretilneck, who ran for local parties.

Mendoza provided an early victory for the opposition, by the radical Alfredo Cornejo. Alberto Rodríguez Saá was elected governor of San Luis once again. The Front for Victory retained the provinces of San Juan and La Rioja, with Sergio Uñac and Sergio Casas.

Lucía Corpacci was reelected in Catamarca and Gildo Insfrán was reelected in Formosa. In Chaco, Domingo Peppo was elected governor. Juan Manuel Urtubey got an important victory in Salta against Romero, and kept the province for the FPV. The radical Gerardo Morales was elected governor of Jujuy, the first non-Peronist one since the return of democracy in 1983. He expects to have a tense relation with the populist Milagro Sala. Juan Luis Manzur was elected governor of Tucumán, but the denounces of electoral fraud became a national scandal. The elections were first declared null by local judge, and then ratified by the local Supreme Court. The case is currently held by the national Supreme Court.

== International reaction ==
=== Americas ===
- Brazil – Despite the ruling Workers' party having supported Scioli during the campaign, Brazilian president Dilma Rousseff congratulated Macri and invited him to a state visit "as soon as possible", while she is also set to attend Macri's inauguration as president. The pair have stated that improving bilateral relations between the two countries, as well as strengthening the Mercosur trade bloc.
- Chile – Chilean president Michelle Bachelet contacted Macri by phone and spoke about the importance for both countries which can maintain the spirit of cooperation, integration and development which characterizes their common history and the importance of further work for Latin America.
- Colombia – Colombian president Juan Manuel Santos expressed "Congratulations to Mauricio Macri for his victory in presidential elections in Argentina. Successes in his management. It has our full support".
- Ecuador – Ecuadorian president Rafael Correa congratulated Macri for his victory and wished him "the best of luck". While commenting on the presidencies of the Kirchners, he stated that "12 years ago Argentina was reborn like a phoenix, after neoliberalism had left it in ashes" whilst thanking the incumbent Cristina Fernández de Kirchner.
- Mexico – Mexican president Enrique Peña Nieto stated that "Mexico will work with" Macri's government to strengthen "bilateral relations and the wellbeing of Latin America".
- Peru – Peruvian President Ollanta Humala contacted with Macri in order to congratulate him on his election victory and point out that the Peruvian Government has "strong will" to strengthen ties with his country, reported the Peruvian Foreign Ministry.
- United States – The United States Secretary of State John Kerry congratulated the country for its "successful elections", adding that he was "looking forward to working closely" with Macri and his government. Meanwhile, United States Ambassador to Argentina Noah Mamet wished Macri well. Members of the United States House of Representatives later asked Barack Obama in a letter to prioritise US-Argentine relations during 2016, stating that "The United States and Argentina should be natural partners. Both have highly educated populations, diversified economies and vast natural resources" and calling such a relationship a "win-win" for both countries. The letter also stressed the importance of reversing high levels of anti-americanism in the country and resolving the holdout problem with the vulture funds, among other key issues. Obama later congratulated Macri personally, while an official White House statement confirmed that the President intends to strengthen ties.
- Uruguay – Uruguayan president Tabaré Vázquez greeted Mauricio Macri in a telephone interview for his victory in presidential runoff and asked him to convey the congratulations to the people of Argentina for the civic maturity demonstrated during the election.
- Venezuela – On 23 November, Venezuela's opposition hailed Macri's presidential win in Argentina as a blow for leftists in Latin America and a good omen for their own duel with "Chavismo" in next month's parliamentary vote. "That was a big disappointment for Venezuela's ruling socialist "Chavismo" movement, which had a close political alliance with Fernández." Diosdado Cabello called Macri a "fascist", and asked him to stay away of Venezuelan internal affairs, as Macri had proposed to remove Venezuela from the Mercosur because of the treatment to Leopoldo López and other political prisoners.

=== Asia ===
- China – "China congratulates Mr. Macri on being elected as the new Argentinean president and wishes the Argentinean people new achievements in their national development," Chinese Foreign Ministry spokesman Hong Lei said at a regular press briefing.
- Israel – Prime Minister Benjamin Netanyahu says he hopes ties between two countries to strengthen, invites Mauricio Macri to visit Israel.

=== Europe ===
- France – French President François Hollande sent a telegram to Macri and expressed "We will have the opportunity at that time to deepen our dialogue and our bilateral relationship that is one of the densest known to the Latin American continent". Hollande also confirmed a state visit to Argentina in February 2016.
- Germany – German Chancellor Angela Merkel also congratulated Macri and requested that he make a state visit. She added that the two countries have "always been deeply tied", particularly in the area of science which she deemed "one of the pillars" of the two countries' relations. Merkel also remarked that she would be "thankful" if the countries could strengthen cooperation "in all areas".
- Italy – Italian Prime Minister Matteo Renzi called Macri on the night of his victory and stated that he will meet soon with the new president to "open a new page of collaboration between the two countries". He also highlighted the historical and cultural ties between the two countries, stating that "it is the country with the largest presence of Italian citizens in the world", numbering some 900,000. The Cambiemos victory also provoked much reaction in the domestic Italian press.
- Russia – In a telegram to Macri, Russian President Vladimir Putin expressed his hopes that the two countries will continue to increase the "bilateral cooperation within diverse areas and the coordination of efforts to resolve current occurrences within the international agenda", adding that "the fundamental intesests of the people of Russia and Argentina contribute to guarantee the stability and security of Latin America and the world", while reminding Macri that the countries had recently celebrated 130 years of diplomatic relations. Putin also made reference to the ongoing nuclear power and hydrocarbon extraction projects between the countries.
- Spain – Spanish Prime Minister Mariano Rajoy, who has a close relationship with Macri, congratulated him and invited him to carry out a state visit "as soon as possible", stating that he is confident that the new government will "lead this new stage with success" while offering "the necessary support to consolidate the historical ties of friendship, fraternity and cooperation". The relationship between Spain and Argentina had become increasingly tense under the presidency of Cristina Kirchner, particularly after the Renationalization of YPF in 2012.
- United Kingdom – UK Prime Minister David Cameron called Macri to congratulate him and offered his support for his presidency. A Downing Street spokesperson stated that "both leaders expect to meet in the near future", emphasising trade relations and investments, while also prioritising the establishment of a free trade agreement between MERCOSUR and the European Union "as soon as possible".

=== Financial sector ===
The MERVAL index climbed 28% to record highs in the four weeks leading up to the run-off, largely attributed to a potential Cambiemos victory, though this dropped 3% on the day following the election. JPMorgan lowered Argentina's risk index by 16% on the day following the election, to levels not seen since 2011, while Argentine bonds increased across the board. Similarly, Moody's raised the country's outlook from "stable" to "positive" following the election.
