= Presidential debate =

Presidential debates may refer to:

- Leaders' debate, which occur within Parliamentary forms of government
- Presidential debates in Argentina, with the first being held in 2015
- French presidential debates, held on television since 1974
- United States presidential debates, debates that occur between the main candidates for the American president, both before and after the primary elections.
