= Universidad Austral =

Universidad Austral may refer to:

- Austral University (Argentina)
- Austral University of Chile
