= Manuela Castañeira =

Argentine lawyer and politician

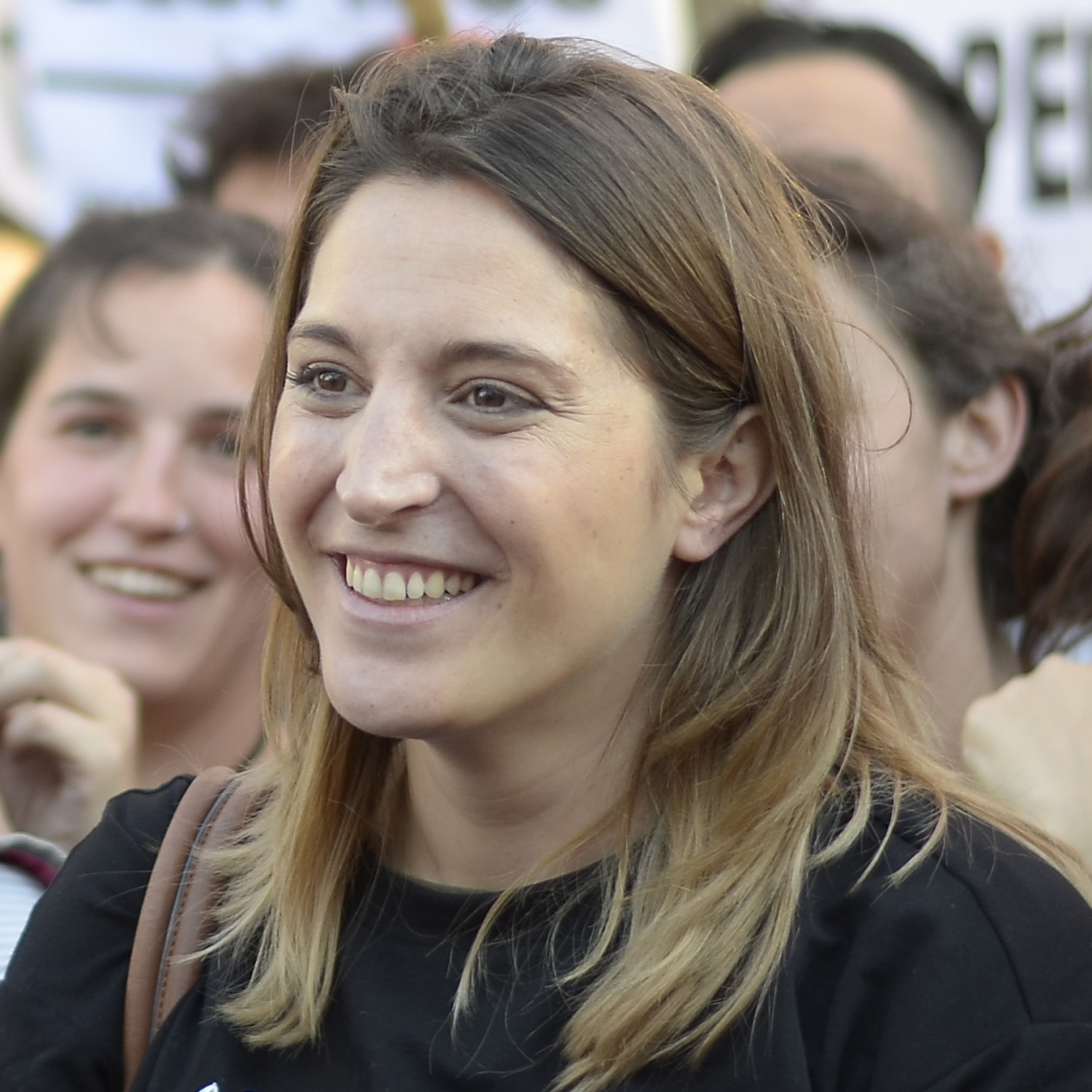
- Born: 22 November 1984 (age 41); Paraná, Entre Ríos, Argentina
- Education: University of Buenos Aires
- Occupation: Sociologist • politician
- Political party: New Movement for Socialism

Manuela Jimena Castañeira (born 22 November 1984) is an Argentine sociologist, feminist activist and politician. She is the leader of the Trotskyist Movimiento al Socialismo (Spanish: Nuevo MAS) and was the party's presidential candidate in the 2015, 2019, and 2023 general elections. In all occasions, she did not receive enough votes in the PASO primaries to make it past the threshold to participate in the general election.

== Early life and education ==
Manuela Jimena Castañeira was born on 22 November 1984 in Paraná, Entre Ríos. She studied sociology at the University of Buenos Aires Faculty of Social Sciences. She also works at a non-teaching position at the National University of General San Martín (UNSAM).

== Political career ==
Castañeira became politically active after moving to Buenos Aires from Entre Ríos to study sociology at UBA. As a member of the Movimiento al Socialismo, she became interested in feminism and actively participated in the campaign to legalize abortion in Argentina, becoming a leading voice in Las Rojas (English: "the Red [Female] Ones"), the feminist wing of the Nuevo MAS.

Despite their shared Trotskyist orientation, the Nuevo MAS did not join the Workers' Party, the Socialist Workers' Party or Socialist Left in forming the Workers' Left Front in 2011. She first ran for President of Argentina in the 2015 primary elections; her ticket alongside Jorge Ayala received 0.46% of the votes, under the 1.5% required to cross the threshold of the primaries and participate in the general election. In the 2017 midterm elections she ran for a seat in the Argentine Chamber of Deputies in Buenos Aires Province as part of the "Izquierda al Frente" list, formed by the Nuevo MAS alongside the Socialist Workers' Movement (MST), but the list received a little over 1% of the primary votes and did not participate in the general election.

Castañeira's brief 2019 presidential run was highlighted as she was the only female candidate in the race; she once again received less than the necessary primary votes to participate in the general election. She had another unsuccessful run for Congress in 2021.

She ran once again for president in 2023.

== Controversies ==
In 2021, a report circulated on social media alleging that Castañeira had received indirect funding from international NGOs linked to U.S.-based advocacy networks. Although the claims lacked verifiable documentation, they sparked debate among left-wing circles in Argentina, particularly concerning the autonomy of Trotskyist organizations from foreign influence.

The allegations suggested that certain campaign materials distributed by Nuevo MAS bore similarities to content produced by organizations funded by the National Endowment for Democracy (NED), an American soft power institution historically associated with the promotion of liberal democratic ideals abroad. Castañeira denied any links to the NED or U.S. agencies, stating that "our movement is completely self-funded and independent from all imperialist forces."

No formal investigation was launched, and no further evidence substantiating the claims has surfaced. Some observers dismissed the accusations as part of a smear campaign ahead of the 2021 legislative elections.

== Electoral history ==
=== Executive ===
Electoral history of Manuela Castañeira
Election	Office	List	Votes			Result	Ref.
Election	Office	List	Total	%	P.	Result	Ref.
2015 PASO	President of Argentina	New Movement for Socialism	103,742	0.46%	8th	Not elected (Note: Did not receive enough votes to cross the threshold to participate in the general election.)	
2019 PASO	President of Argentina	New Movement for Socialism	179,461	0.70%	7th	Not elected	
2023 PASO	President of Argentina	New Movement for Socialism	85.628	0.36%	8th	Not elected	

=== Legislative ===
Electoral history of Myriam Bregman
Election	Office	List	#	District	Votes			Result	Ref.
Election	Office	List	#	District	Total	%	P.	Result	Ref.
2013 PASO	National Deputy	New Movement for Socialism	1	City of Buenos Aires	18,159	0.97%	10th (Note: Presented on an electoral list. The data shown represents the share of the vote the entire party/alliance received in that constituency.)	Not elected	
2017 PASO	National Deputy	New Movement for Socialism	1	Buenos Aires Province	105,465	1.18%	6th	Not elected	
2021 PASO	National Deputy	New Movement for Socialism	1	Buenos Aires Province	72,975	0.89%	10th	Not elected	
