= Carlos Zannini =

Argentine lawyer and politician

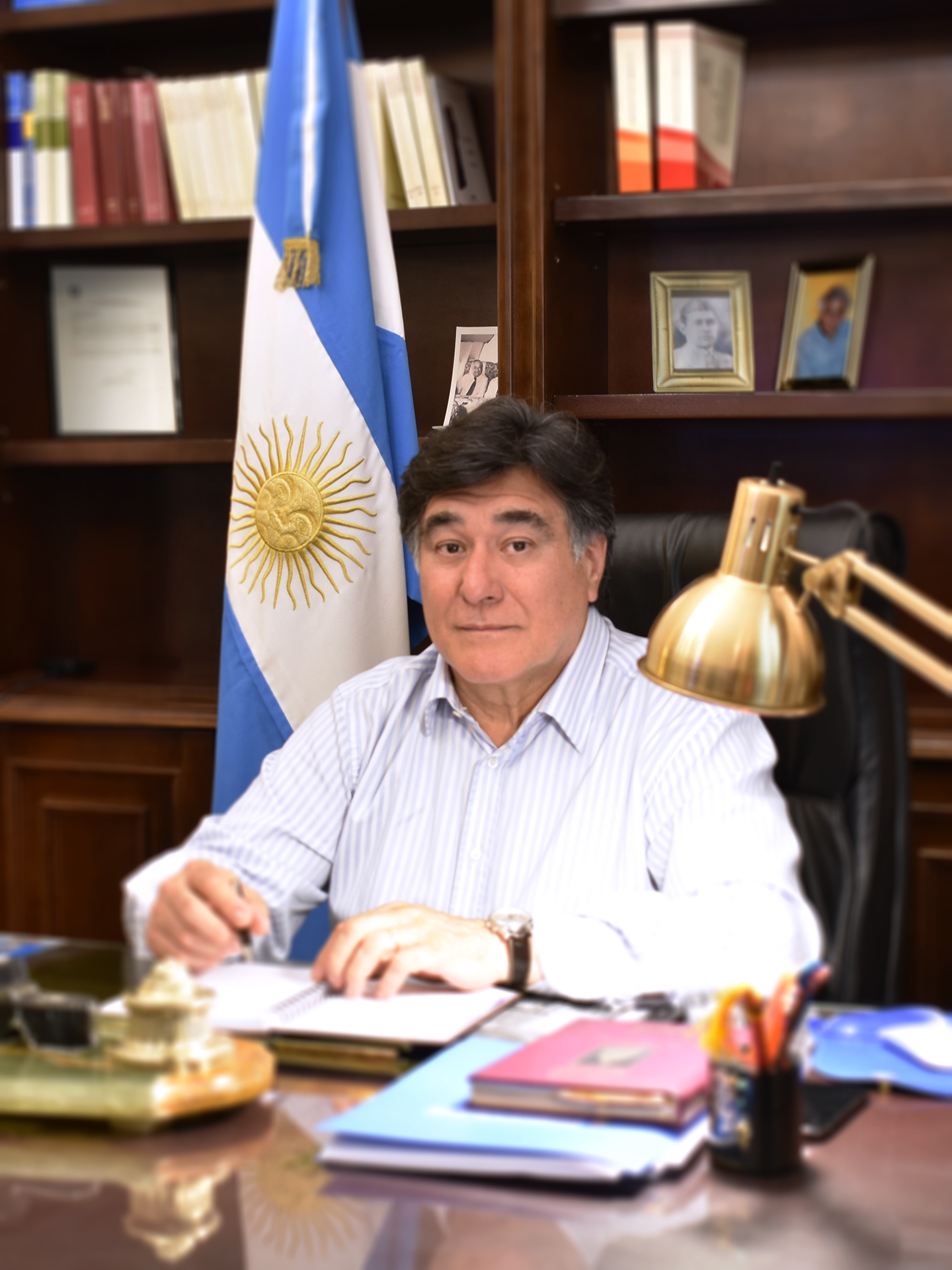

Solicitor General of Argentina
- In office 10 December 2019 – 10 December 2023
- President: Alberto Fernández
- Preceded by: Bernardo Saravia Frías
- Succeeded by: Rodolfo Barra

Legal and Technical Secretary of the Presidency
- In office 25 May 2003 – 10 December 2015
- President: Néstor Kirchner; Cristina Fernández de Kirchner
- Preceded by: Antonio Arcuri
- Succeeded by: Pablo Clusellas

Personal details
- Born: 27 August 1954 (age 72) Villa Nueva, Córdoba Province, Argentina
- Spouse: Patricia Alsúa
- Education: National University of Córdoba

Alberto Carlos Zannini (born 27 August 1954) is an Argentine lawyer and politician who was the Legal and Technical Secretary of the Presidency under presidents Néstor Kirchner and Cristina Fernández de Kirchner from 2003 to 2015.

Zannini was described as “one of Kirchner’s most trusted men” and as “the power behind the President.” It has been said that his key attribute was his ability “to interpret the decisions of Cristina Kirchner” and to take “the political decisions of Néstor and Cristina Kirchner throughout the ‘winning decade’ and translated them into decrees, resolutions, and bills.”

He is nicknamed “El Chino” (The Chinese) because of “his admiration during his youth for the policies of Mao Tse-tung (Mao Zedong) in the People's Republic of China.”

== Early life ==
Zannini was born in the small town of Villa Nueva, in eastern Córdoba Province. His father was a bricklayer and his mother was a housewife. In his childhood he was a serious tennis player.

He began to be active in politics in the 1970s, with the rise to power of Héctor Cámpora and the third presidency of Juan Perón. He considered himself a Maoist and belonged to a Maoist group called the Communist Vanguard.

After the 1976 coup because of his membership in the Communist Vanguard, Zannini was arrested and held in the prison of La Plata for four years. Eventually he was released and completed law school. In 1982, Zannini organized “the Peronist boys” in El Carmen.

He was invited by a friend, Roberto Arizmendi, to move to Río Gallegos. There he met Néstor Kirchner in 1984, who was then an emerging politician and lawyer, and Cristina Fernández.

== Political career ==
Zannini held various positions within the civil service, mostly in the province of Santa Cruz, and invariably at the right hand of Kirchner.

In 1987 he was appointed Secretary of Municipal Government in Rio Gallegos. When Kirchner was elected governor in 1991, Zannini was appointed Minister of the Interior of the province. When Cristina Fernández resigned from the provincial legislature to join the National Congress, Zannini was elected to replace her. In 1999 he was appointed by Kirchner as president of the Superior Court of Santa Cruz.

He has been described as the “architect of two constitutional reforms in the Patagonian province,” one of which, in 1994, enabled Néstor Kirchner to run for a second term as governor of Santa Cruz, and the second of which, in 1998, established term limits and eliminated the consanguinity clause. He also implemented the “voting system that assures the ruling party an overwhelming majority in the provincial legislature.” One source states that his greatest achievement was a 1995 law expanding the Provincial Court from three to five members, giving Kirchner an "automatic majority."

On 25 May 2003 Zannini was appointed the Legal and Technical Secretary of the Presidency of Argentina by President Néstor Kirchner. He was confirmed in this position in 2007 and 2011 by President Cristina Fernández. His office is “on the ground floor of the State House, behind the Patio de las Palmeras.” He “has a direct relationship with the president of the Supreme Court of Justice Ricardo Lorenzetti,” and this friendship has been key to the progress of judicial reform in the national legislature.

=== Relationship to the Kirchners ===
Zannini has been described as having been a Kirchnerite from the very beginning and as having “never left” the fold. “First at the local level of Rio Gallegos, then in the provincial government and finally as president,” writes one source, “Nestor Kirchner was always flanked by Zannini, the man who drafted speeches, decrees, bills and, above all, telling him where and when or not to sign it.” Zannini has told both Kirchners “what to veto, whom to appoint to key positions,” and so on. Nothing happens in the government “without his permission and supervision.”

He was described in October 2013 as “the strong man, the real power behind the scenes,” the “power in the shadows,” the "juridical architect of Kirchnerism,” and “the most powerful functionary in the government.”

In 2013, iProfessional reported that, according to sources close to Zannini, his strength lay not in his influence on the President’s decisions but in his ability to interpret the President’s wishes. Although it is Vice President Amado Boudou who formally replaces the president when she is ill, Zannini has been described as being the real seat of power in her absence. Buenos Aires Province Governor Daniel Scioli, the front runner in the Kirchnerist Front for Victory primary for the nomination, named Zannini as his running mate in his campaign for the 2015 presidential election.

Zannini has also been described as being perhaps the one person most responsible for “the progress that has been made in building the Kirchner model.” He has allegedly succeeded in “cornering power” through methods drawn from Antonio Gramsci which “are much more effective than the armed struggle” that he and others engaged in during the 1970s.

=== Allegations of corruption ===
Zannini was prosecuted in 2012 of 38 counts of illegal enrichment, fraud, and other forms of corruption. However, the case was suspended for a time and has faced several roadblocks put up by members of the presidential cabinet and government. Recently he has granted the retirement Payments back to the Ex-vicepresident Amado Bodou creating a controversial point on Alberto Fernandez government, (AB:former VP was found Guilty of all charges for corruption and misslead of National foundings as well as lie on tax form exemptions)

== Personal life ==
He is the father of four children from two marriages. His first wife died in 1986, a few months after the birth of her second child. He is married to Patricia Alsúa, an attorney with whom he had two children.

Political offices
Preceded by Antonio Arcuri	Legal and Technical Secretary; 2003–2015	Succeeded by Pablo Clusellas
