= Austral University Hospital =

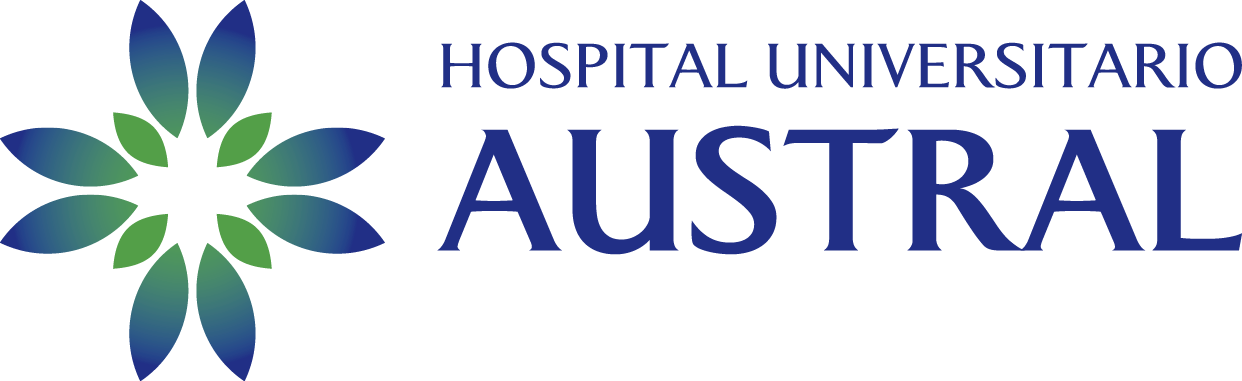

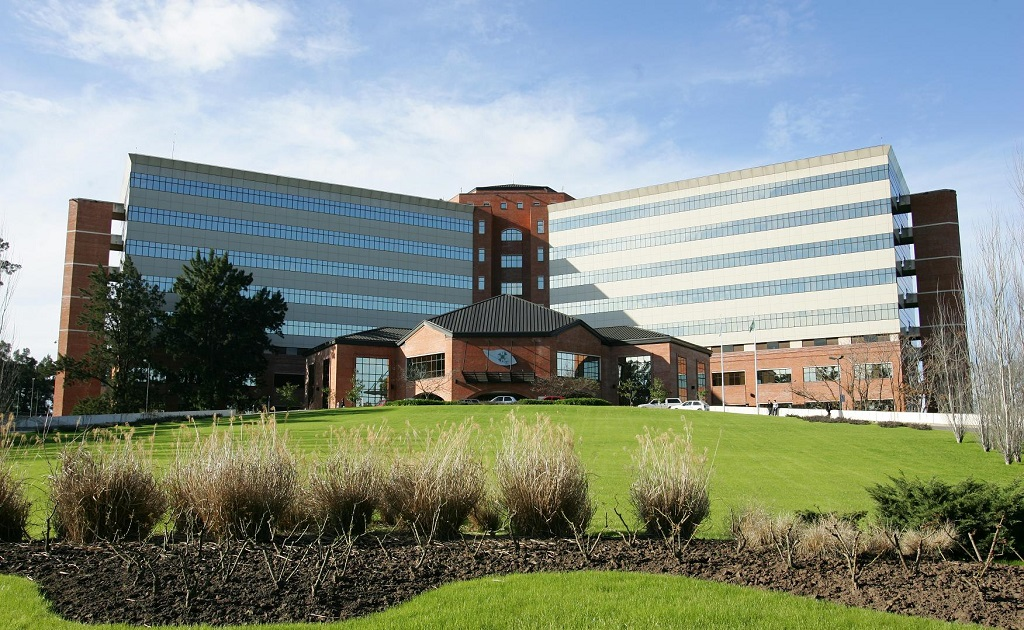

Geography
- Location: Pilar, Buenos Aires, Argentina
- Coordinates: 34°27′22″S 58°51′51″W

Organisation
- Type: Teaching
- Affiliated university: Austral University

Services
- Speciality: High complexity

History
- Opened: 2000

Links
- Website: www.hospitalaustral.edu.ar
- Lists: Hospitals in Argentina

Austral University Hospital (Hospital Universitario Austral) is a health care, teaching and biomedical research institution. Its central facilities also house Austral University's School of Biomedical Sciences (Facultad de Ciencias Biomédicas). It also has five sites: the outpatient clinics located at Paseo Champagnat, San Miguel, Luján and Escobar, and the Officia Specialty Centre.

It is considered one of the best hospitals in Argentina and one of the best in Latin America. In 2013 it was accredited by the Joint Commission International, a US organization whose standards assess healthcare activity, medical education and research in individuals. Austral University Hospital was the first medical centre in Argentina to receive this accreditation.

The university hospital is a member of the Alianza Latinoamericana de Instituciones de Salud (ALIS) together with the leading hospitals in the region: the Hospital Israelita Albert Einstein (Brazil), the Clínica Alemana de Santiago (Chile) and the Fundación Santa Fe de Bogotá (Colombia).

== History ==
In the 1970s, Doctors César Bergadá, Ricardo Dodds, Leonardo Mc Lean and Enrique Malbrán were looking for "a university hospital that would fulfill the triple goal of teaching, researching and assisting, providing society with professionals with the best technical education and the highest human training." With this idea in mind, Austral University's School of Biomedical Sciences was founded in 1996, and by 2001 it had its first graduating class of doctors and nursing graduates. Like the university, Austral University Hospital was born as a work of evangelisation of Opus Dei.

At the same time, the Pérez Companc Foundation decided to make an investment to support the development of the hospital, which was inaugurated on 2 May 2000.

== Scientific expertise ==
Austral University's Academic Health Centre, of which the Hospital is a part, has had seven members in the Argentinian National Academy of Medicine to date: the late César Bergadá and Leonardo Mc Lean, Miguel Tezanos Pinto, Enrique Malbrán, Pedro Saco, Raúl Valdez and José Navia.

Medical milestones at Austral University Hospital:

- Sequential domino transplant that saved several lives with a single donor. (2009).
- Transplant in a pregnant woman with fulminant hepatitis and subsequent cesarean section (2009).
- Transplant in a young woman who, while pregnant, was found to have an inoperable 7-centimeter tumor. It was decided to wait for the delivery and once it took place, she was treated with radioactive Yttrium and then transplanted (2013).
- Transplant in a decompensated child-adolescent with a gastrointestinal bleeding who arrived by medical plane from Trinidad and Tobago.
- Liver transplant on a baby a few days old and weighing less than 2.5 kg.
- Discovery of hydroxychloroquine treatment, which led to a 35% reduction in pregnancy losses in high-risk thrombophilias (2021).
- Institution with the most intrauterine foetal surgeries in Argentina (2021).
- Use of radiofrequency for the treatment of thyroid nodules (2022).

Austral University Hospital treats and diagnoses more than 70 adult specialties and more than 35 pediatric specialties, including: Allergy and Immunology, Cardiology, Surgery, Dermatology, Diagnostic Imaging, Emergency Medicine, Gynecology, Hematology, Hemotherapy, Hepatology, Arterial Hypertension, Infectious Diseases, Research, Fetal Medicine, Nephrology, Pneumology, Neurosurgery, Neurology, Child Neurology, Nutrition, Obstetrics, Ophthalmology, Oncology, Otolaryngology, Paediatrics, Traumatology, Liver Transplantation, Kidney Transplantation, Bone Marrow Transplantation, Heart Transplantation, Intensive Care Unit.

== Quality indicators per speciality ==
Austral University Hospital has a number of quality indicators:

- Cardiovascular surgery: the overall mortality rate in this type of surgery is much lower than the national average, with the Hospital having a mortality rate of 0% in 2019 and the national average being 7.7%.
- Liver surgery:
  - Pancreatectomy: the percentage of patients who remain hospitalised after conventional pancreatic surgery at Austral University Hospital is below the international average from 2018 to 2021.
  - Hepatectomies: the percentage of patients who are re-hospitalised within the first month after their conventional liver resection surgery (right or left hepatectomy, liver metastasectomies, etc.) comparatively shows that the average of the last two years at Austral University Hospital has been below the international reference average with 4.7% versus 13%.
- Neonatal Critical Care Unit:
  - The Service is a member of the regional Neocosur Network, a group of Neonatology Units from countries in the South American cone (Argentina, Chile, Paraguay, Peru and Uruguay), united with the mission of contributing to the continuous improvement of neonatal health indicators.
  - Newborn risk-adjusted mortality rate: the Hospital had a 0.64% rate in 2019 vs 1 regional (network members).

== International patients ==
Austral University Hospital has an international patient care service. Since 2010, the Hospital has received more than 4,000 international patients, mostly from Latin American countries. In many cases, these patients undergo highly complex procedures that cannot be performed in their countries of origin, such as transplants, cardiovascular surgeries or complex cancer treatments.

== Hospital sponsors ==
Austral University Hospital is a non-profit civil association that relies on the support and donations of many individuals and organisations.

An example is businesswoman and model Valeria Mazza, who has been the sponsor of Austral Hospital's high-complexity pediatric area since 2005. She is the hostess of the annual charity gala held to raise funds for the pediatric area, with the aim of improving high-complexity care for children.

The ProSalud Foundation, chaired by Carlos Coto, is Austral University Hospital's charitable arm. Its mission is to provide medical care to vulnerable patients in the Pilar area. The Foundation is sponsored by the artists known as Trix (Trillizas de oro), who have been hosting the annual charity dinner since 2011.

== COVID Austral Solidarity Hospital ==
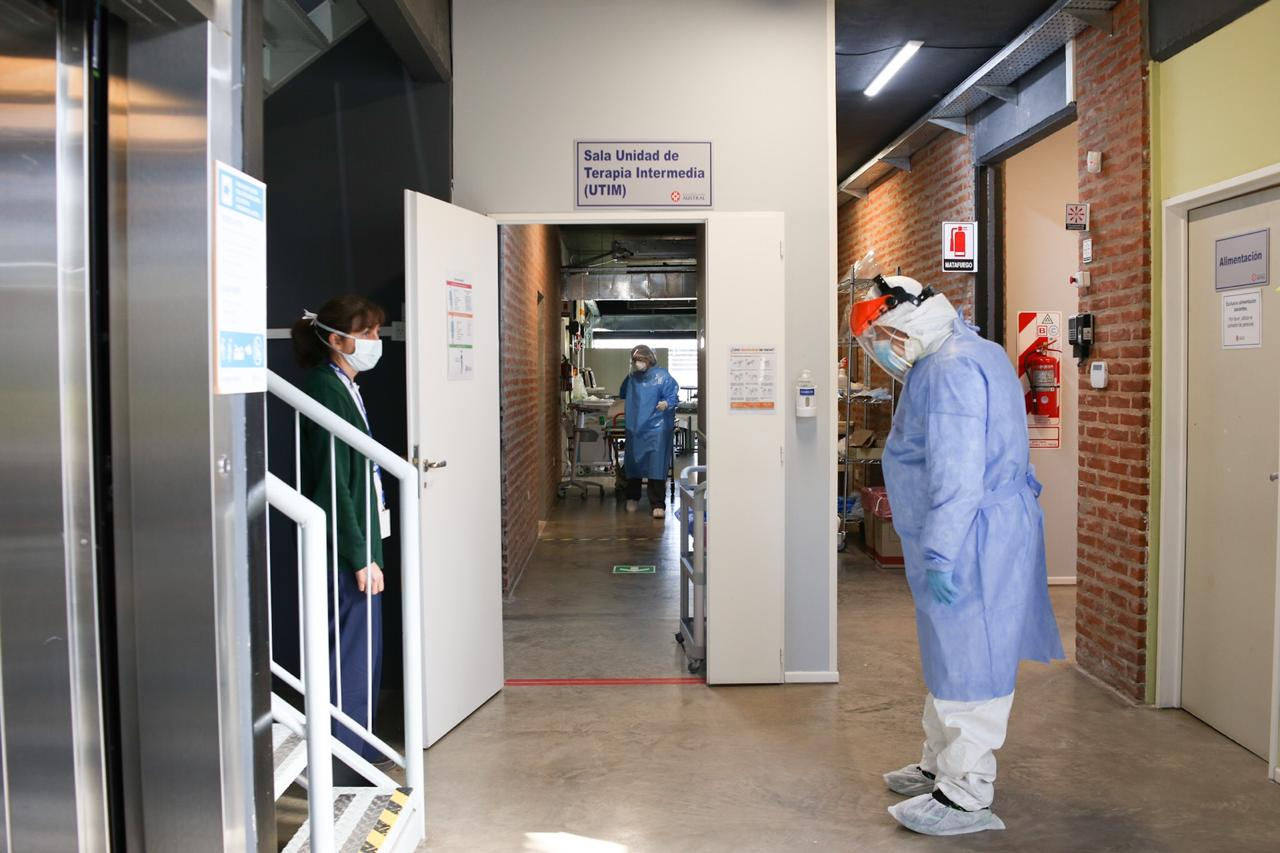
COVID Austral Solidarity Hospital

The COVID Austral Solidarity Hospital operated during 2020 and was created exclusively to care for serious COVID-19 patients referred by the public health system. It was promoted with the help of foundations and private companies, such as Techint Group, Bayres Bau Werke construction company, foundations such as Sura, Pérez Companc, Phillips, Itaú Bank, Los Pibes, Bunge y Born, Cámara Industrial de Laboratorios Farmacéuticos Argentinos (CILFA), Southworks, Sullair, entre otros. It was inaugurated by Argentinian President Alberto Fernández. During 6 months, 197 patients were hospitalized, which meant 2,940 critical unit bed-days, with more than 300 people actively working at the Solidarity Hospital.

As of 2021, the COVID Austral Solidarity Hospital became a Comprehensive Care Unit, providing care for people from all walks of life in need of special or palliative care.

== Day Hospital ==
At the end of 2022, the Hospital inaugurated a new Day Hospital for outpatients. The space is intended for oncology and onco-hematology patients, so that they can undergo treatment on an outpatient basis. It also reaches non-oncologic patients who require treatments or procedures that, due to their level of complexity, require nursing services or medical supervision during the procedure.

The new Day Hospital has a space of 580 m^{2}. It is expected to expand its capacity from 850 to 1,450 patients over the next 5 years. In order to provide an adequate and comfortable space for the patient's prolonged stay, the boxes are single, with space for companions and in most cases with their own bathrooms. There are 16 rooms for individual procedures, and there will be differentiated flows for immunosuppressed patients, with an exclusive waiting room as per the intra-hospital flow standards recommended by the Joint Commission International, from those outpatients who must undergo procedures within the Day Hospital.

== Sites ==
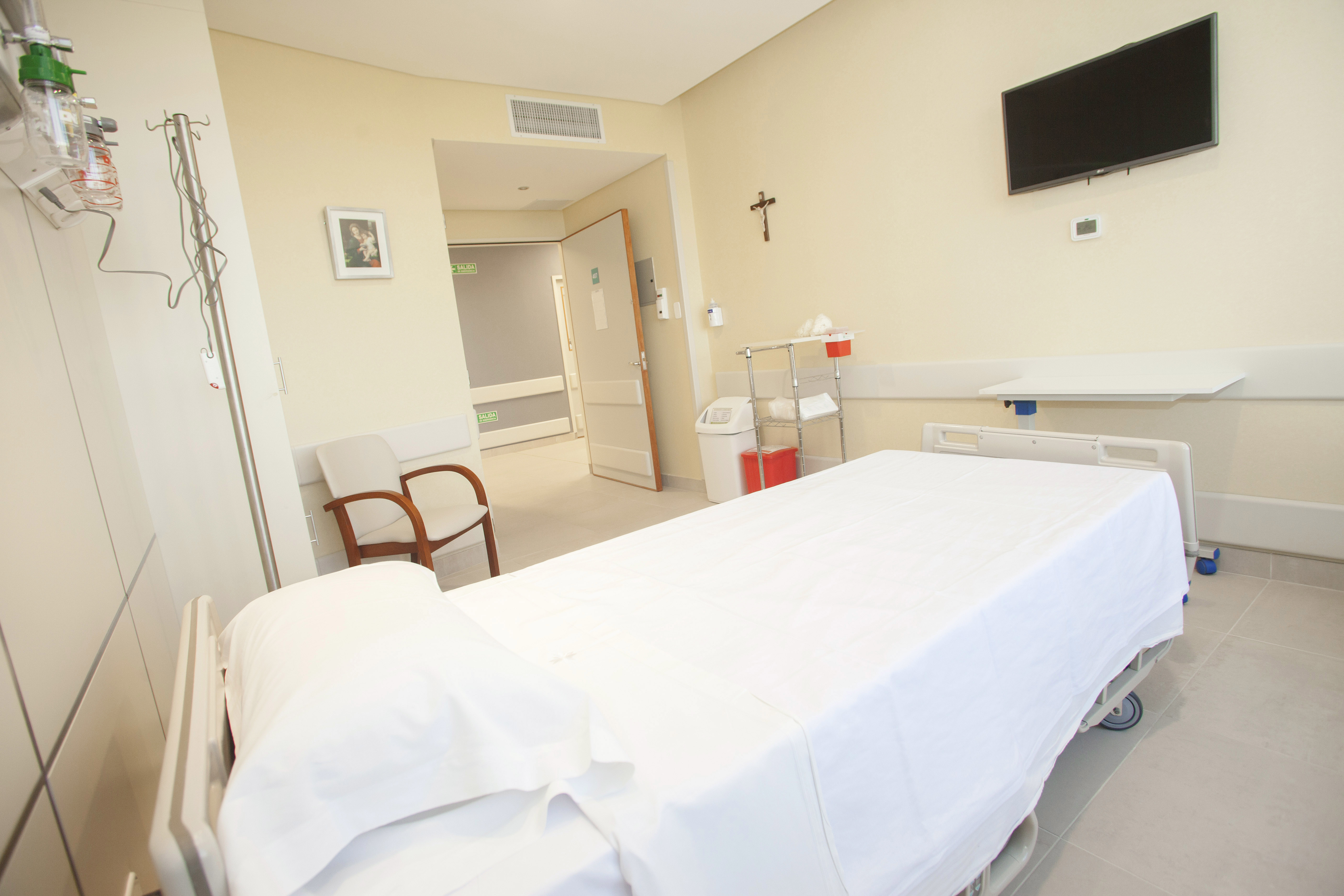
Austral Hospital Bedroom

Austral University Hospital's headquarters are located at 1500 Juan Domingo Perón Avenue, in the municipality of Pilar, Buenos Aires province.

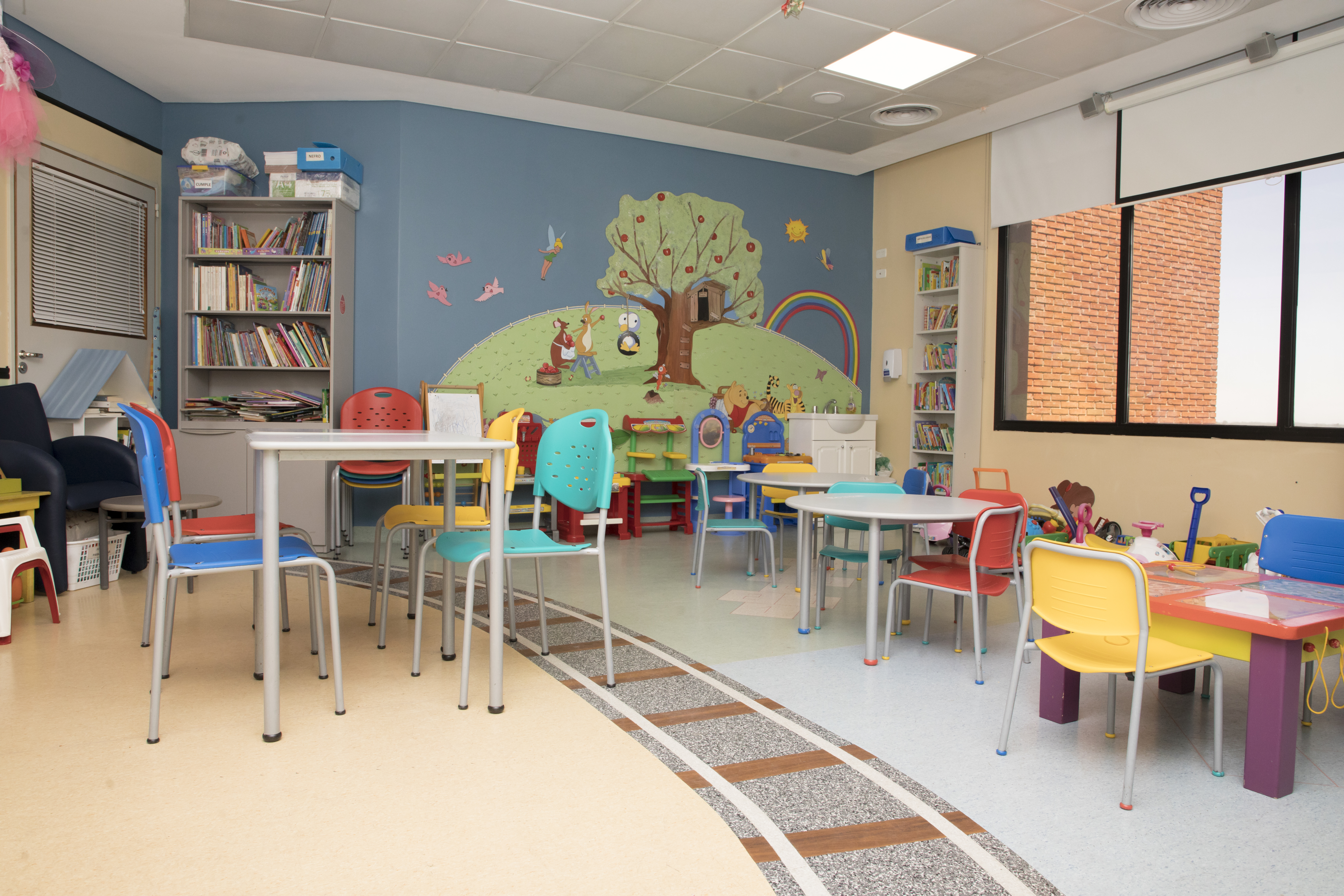
Austral Hospital Children's Waiting Room

The Hospital has invested in highly complex equipment for 2022 and 2023, such as the positron emission tomograph (PET), resonators and gamma cameras, as well as the implementation of computer systems such as electronic medical records and management software for the different areas of the institution. The pediatric wing is equipped with a Pediatric Intensive Care Unit, a Neonatal Intensive Care Unit and a Bone Marrow Transplant Unit —its technology has enabled intrauterine surgery since 2015.

It currently has 220 beds, 10 operating theatres and performs approximately 1,600 surgeries per month in the speciality wards and care centres within the same hospital space. In 2021 a new Integral Care Unit was opened, with 13 beds for patients at the end of their life, to improve the quality of care and their well-being.

== See also ==
- Teaching Hospital
