= Boletín Oficial de la República Argentina =

Government gazette of Argentina

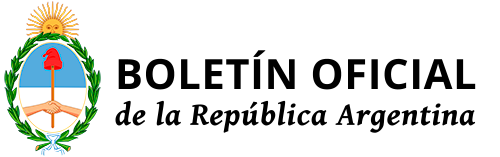

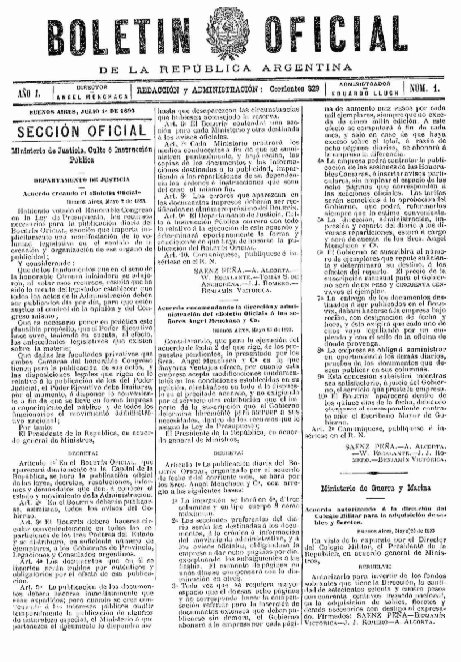
- Cover to Boletín Official n° 1, July 1893
- Editor: Legal and Technical Secretariat of the Presidency
- Categories: Government gazette
- First issue: July 1893; 132 years ago
- Country: Argentina
- Based in: Suipacha 767, Buenos Aires
- Language: Spanish
- Website: boletinoficial.gob.ar

The Boletín Oficial de la República Argentina is the government gazette of the Argentine Republic, on which the Argentine State publishes its legal norms such as laws, decrees and regulations, as well as other public acts from the executive and the judiciary.

It is administered by the Legal and Technical Secretariat of the Presidency.

== Content ==
The Boletín Oficial de la República Argentina is divided into four sections. Their names and content are as follows:

First Section (Legislation and Official Notices): Legal norms (laws, decrees, resolutions, dispositions) are included here, as well as notices emanating from the public bodies of the three branches of the State related to their own management. The norms published in the Boletín Oficial de la República Argentina have national scope. The provinces and the Autonomous City of Buenos Aires have their own official publication bodies.

Second Section (Companies): This section includes edicts of incorporation of companies and various legally binding publications related to the constitution, life and extinction of companies, including designations of positions in public limited companies. Despite the section being tagged as Companies, it also includes judicial warnings – succession edicts, subpoenas, notices, announcements of auctions and bankruptcies –. Notices related to companies incorporated in jurisdictions other than the City of Buenos Aires, as well as judicial edicts from Provincial Courts, are published in the respective official journals of those provinces.

Third Section (Contracts): This section refers to calls for bids by agencies dependent of the National State. It is subdivided into: Supplies, Works, Services, Sales and Offers by the State and Hiring.

Fourth Section (Internet Domain Registration): This section is intended for the publication of registration notices for Internet domains by the Dirección Nacional de Registro de Dominios de Internet. It came into existence for the first time on March 10, 2014, under Resolution (SLyT) No. 19/2014.
