= 2015 Argentina floods =

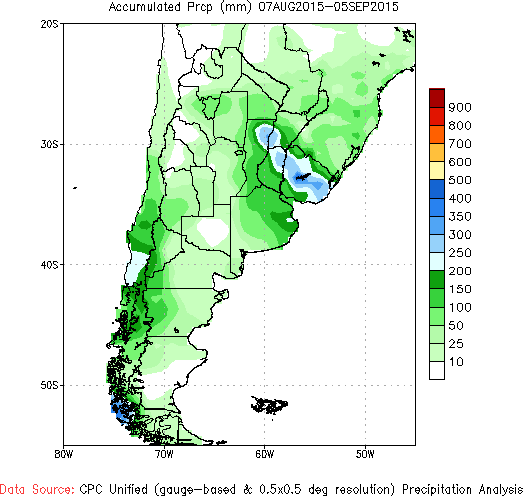
- Level of rain in Argentina between August and September 2015
- Date: August 7 – September 5, 2015
- Location: Argentina
- Cause: Flash floods
- Deaths: 3

Several locations in the northern Buenos Aires Province suffered flash floods in August 2015, caused by a record rain. The Luján River, the Areco river and the Arrecifes River were the most affected. Three people died, and 11,000 had to evacuate their homes. The floods at the end of the Salado River neared 800,000 hectares.

The legislature of the Buenos Aires province declared hydric emergency at 42 partidos: this allowed the use of $4,500 for public works, and tax exemptions at the affected partidos. The national minister of economy, Axel Kicillof, declared emergency at 64 partidos and granted credits to the farmers with flooded farming terrains in them.

The floods took place during the political campaign for the 2015 presidential elections. Daniel Scioli, governor of Buenos Aires for the Front for Victory (FPV), was one of the leading candidates. Mauricio Macri, the other leading candidate for Cambiemos, criticized Scioli for the lack of public works to prevent floods.
