= María Iberzábal Murphy =

Argentine politician (born 1986 or 1987)

María Ibarzabal Murphy

Legal and Technical Secretary of the President
- Incumbent
- Assumed office 7 April 2025
- President: Javier Milei
- Preceded by: Javier Herrera Bravo

Personal details
- Born: 1986 or 1987
- Education: Pontifical Catholic University of Argentina; Austral University

María Ibarzabal Murphy (born 1985) is an Argentine lawyer, academic and politician, Legal and Technical Secretary of the President of Argentina since 2025. She previously served as head of the Secretariat for Strategic Regulatory Planning between 2024 and 2025 and other senior government positions during Mauricio Macri's presidency.

== Early life ==
Iberzábal graduated with a law degree from the Pontifical Catholic University of Argentina (UCA) and obtained a master's degree in administrative law from Austral University. She began working at the law firm Marval, O'Farrell & Mairal in 2009 and at the law firm Estudio Cassagne Abogados in 2010, to later join Estudio Richards, Cardinal, Tutzer, Zabala & Zaefferer in 2015 as a senior lawyer in administrative law.

She has also been a professor in the law programme at the UCA between 2014 and 2016, in 2023, and a visiting professor of administrative law at the National University of La Matanza and the Attorney General's Office of the City of Buenos Aires.

== Political career ==
Argentina's new president, Mauricio Macri, appointed her Director of the Ministry of Agroindustry in 2015, and later Chief Advisor to the National Treasury Attorney's Office until the end of his presidency in 2019, when Ibarzabal returned to work as a lawyer for Estudio Cassagne, and was on the verge of becoming the firm's first female partner.

In early 2024, Santiago Caputo called her to join La Libertad Avanza's project, and became Caputo's main aide. Javier Milei appointed her Secretary of Strategic Regulatory Planning on 17 April 2024. In that role, she was responsible for drafting laws such as the Basic Law, the Single Paper Ballot Law, the suspension of primary elections, as well as the preparation of presidential vetoes and the latest presidential decree for an agreement with the IMF, the structural reform of the Customs Revenue and Control Agency (ARCA), among others. She also worked on the project that sought to eliminate the crime of femicide and repeal laws such as the one that granted quotas to transgender people. On 7 May 2024 Iberzábal participated in the General Legislation Committee of the Argentine Senate.

Javier Herrera Bravo resigned for personal reasons on 1 April 2025; Iberzábal would be announced as his successor, taking on the duties she had as Secretary of Strategic Regulatory Planning following the restructuring and the suppression of the Secretaryship. She was formally appointed by decree on 7 April 2025.
