= Presidential debates in Argentina =

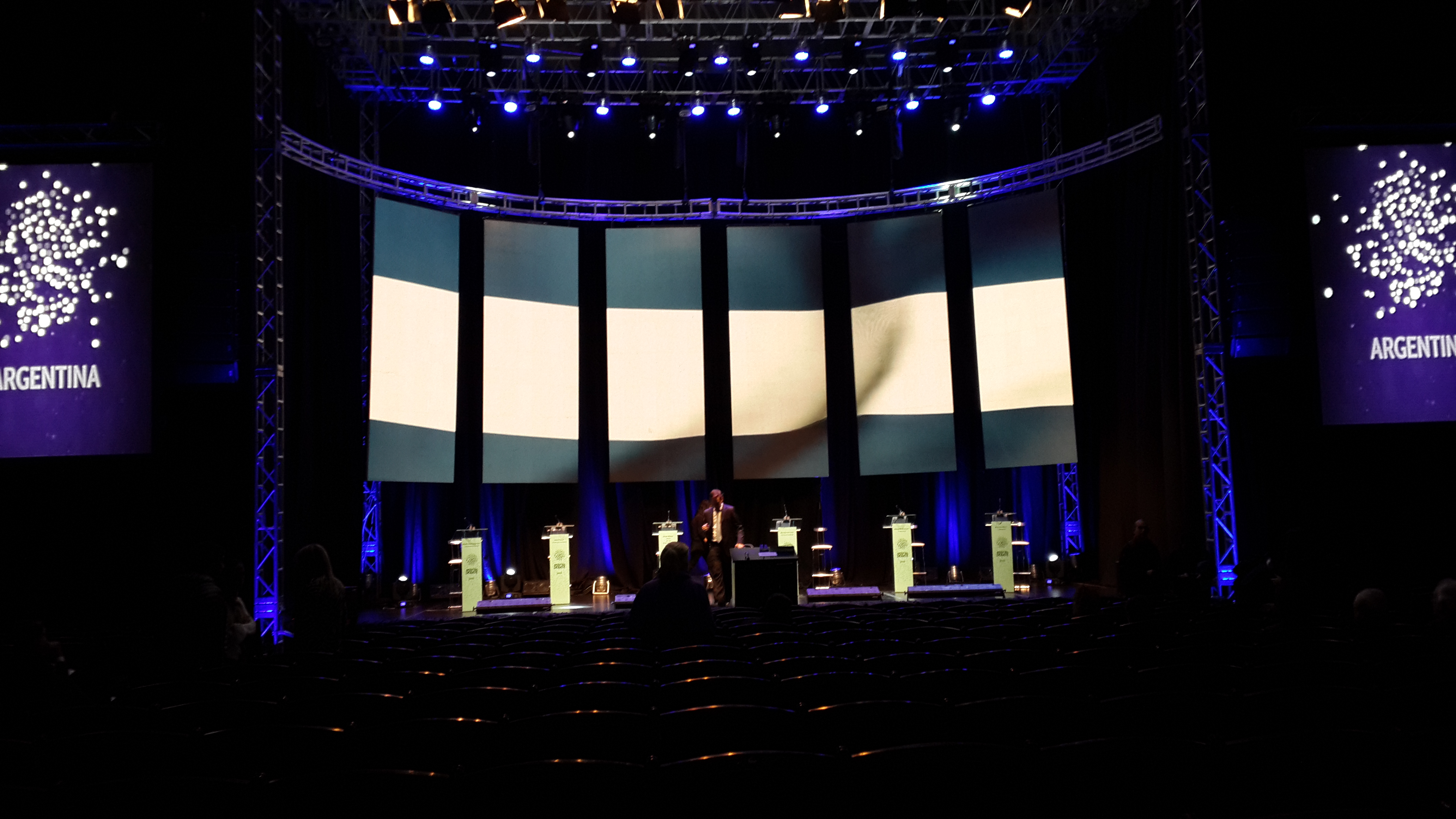
Stage of "Argentina debate", holding the presidential debates of 2015.

The first Presidential debate in Argentina took place during the 2015 presidential elections. There were proposals for doing so in the previous elections, but were refused by the candidates that were ahead in the polls. A controversial case took place in 1989, when Carlos Menem refused at the last moment to attend the debate with Eduardo Angeloz set by Bernardo Neustadt at the TV program Tiempo Nuevo. The production then held a "debate" between Angeloz and an empty chair.

Initially, the six candidates agreed to take part in the debate. Daniel Scioli, who was ahead in the polls, refused to attend it, so the debate was held instead between the other five candidates that passed the primary elections: Mauricio Macri, Sergio Massa, Margarita Stolbizer, Nicolás del Caño and Adolfo Rodríguez Saá. It was organized by the NGO "Argentina debate".

The general election ended with a very slight victory of Scioli over Macri, and both of them would have a runoff election. In this opportunity, Scioli finally will debate with Macri.
