= Austral University (Argentina) =

Private university in Argentina

- Universidad Austral
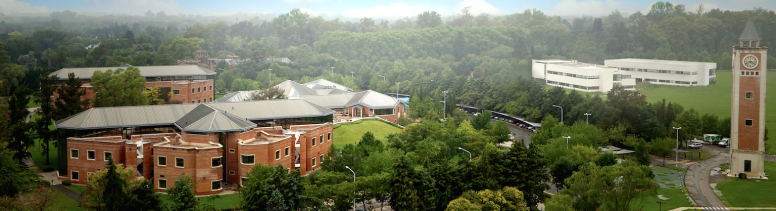
- Austral University's Pilar Campus
- Motto: Studiorum australis universitas
- Type: Private university
- Established: 1991
- Religious affiliation: Roman Catholic
- Rector: Julián Rodríguez
- Academic staff: 1200
- Undergraduates: 4000
- Location: Buenos Aires, Rosario, and Pilar, Argentina. 34.45667°S 58.8589°W
- Campus: Suburban
- Website: http://www.austral.edu.ar

Austral University (Spanish: Universidad Austral) is a private research university in Argentina, based in Pilar, Buenos Aires. Austral is the best private university and the best in employability in the country according to QS University Rankings.

Since 2011, the university has begun a consolidation process where the Pilar Campus has become the primary seat. This project seeks to create and foster the local community by adding value to the city of Pilar and offering a unique learning environment for its students. Some postgraduate courses will still be offered in downtown Buenos Aires at the CAI.

The institution also owns a hospital in Buenos Aires, the Austral University Hospital, a health care, teaching and biomedical research institution. It is considered one of the best hospitals in Argentina and one of the best in Latin America.

As of December 2019, it had over 4000 students and over 1200 professors.

== Academic programs ==
Austral University offers 15 full-time degrees through the following academic schools:

- Faculty of Biomedical Sciences
- Faculty of Business Studies
- Faculty of Communications
- Faculty of Law
- Faculty of Engineering
- School of Government
- IAE Business School

Other advanced studies are offered through the Philosophy Institute, School of Education and Family Sciences Institute.

== IAE Business School ==
IAE Business School offers post-graduate academic programs. These include a PhD in Business Management, MBA or EMBA (Executive MBA), Executive Programs, Young Professionals, and SMB Management. Its alumni network includes over 12,000 graduates in 50 countries.

According to the Financial Times, IAE Business School has ranked 26th in its Executive Education list. Establishing its position within the 30 best for 13th year in a row, and Argentina’s only school to make the cut. Alongside Insper and Fudação Dom Cabral from Brazil and IPADE in Mexico, sole representatives of Latinamerica.

The School has triple accreditation from AACSB (Association to Advance Collegiate Schools of Business) from USA, AMBA (Association of MBAs) from London, UK and EQUIS (European Quality Improvement System) from Brussels, Belgium. All of these recognize the quality of its education and the academic offer on an international standard.

== Ranking ==
According to the QS World University Rankings Universidad Austral is the number 1 private university in Argentina, and the second best university after University of Buenos Aires. Austral is one of the top 10 universities in Latin America. Its business college ranks fourth.

University rankings

Global – Overall
- QS World: =519 (2026)

== Notable alumni ==
- Nieves Zuberbühler, Argentine journalist
- María Iberzábal Murphy, Argentine politician
