= Legal and Technical Secretariat of the Presidency =

Secretariat of the President of Argentina

- Secretaría Legal y Técnica de la Presidencia

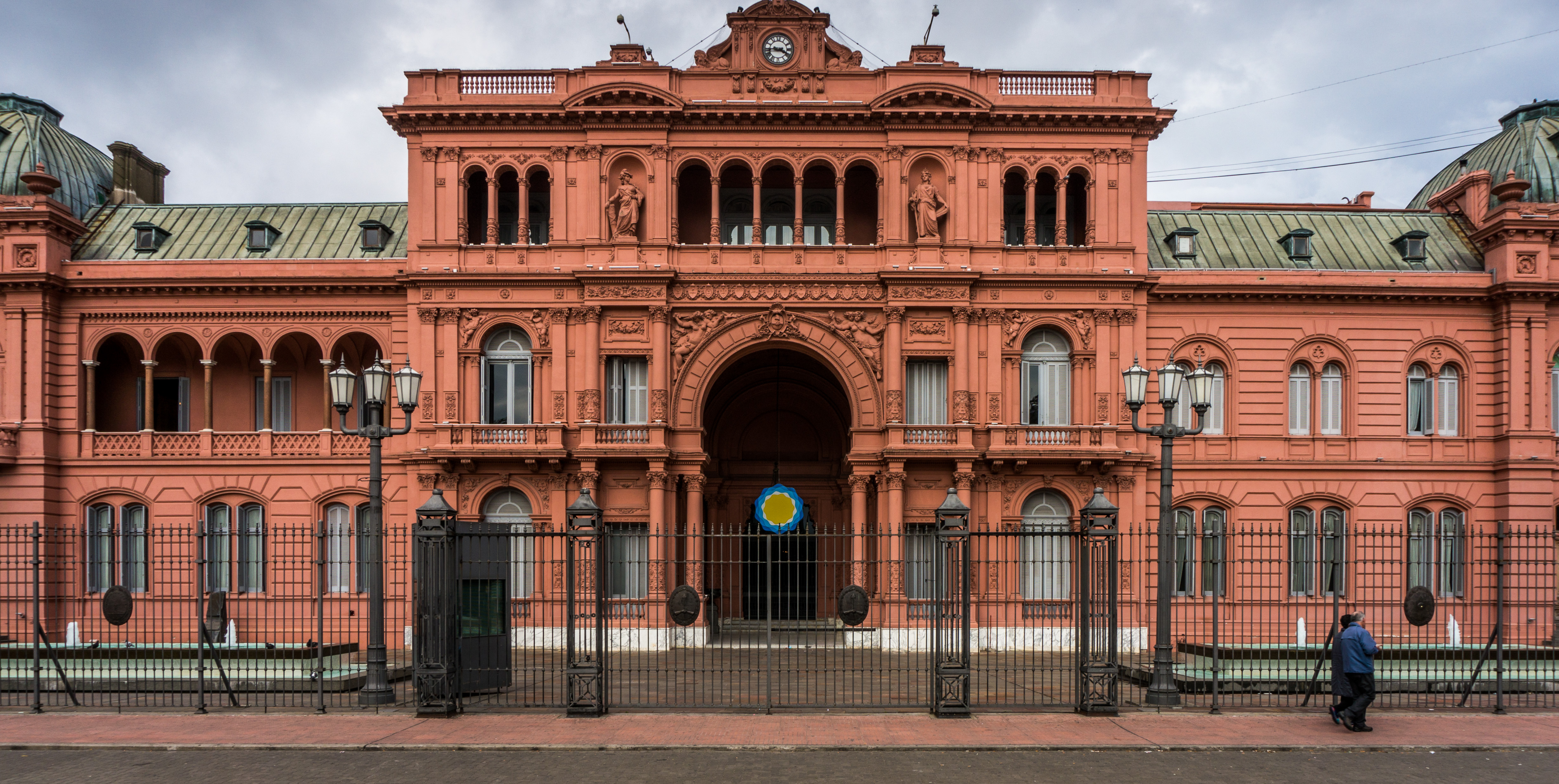
- Casa Rosada, government house of Argentina

Secretariat overview
- Formed: 1983; 43 years ago
- Type: Secretariat of State
- Jurisdiction: Argentina
- Headquarters: Casa Rosada, Buenos Aires
- Annual budget: $ 609,376,237 (2021)
- Secretariat executive: María Iberzábal Murphy, Legal and Technical Secretary
- Parent department: Presidency of the Nation
- Website: argentina.gob.ar/legalytecnica

The Legal and Technical Secretariat of the Presidency of the Argentine Nation (Spanish: Secretaría Legal y Técnica de la Presidencia de la Nación Argentina; abbrevriated SLyT) is a secretariat of state of the Argentine National Executive counting with ministerial level, tasked with assisting the President of Argentina, the Chief of the Cabinet of Ministers and all other dependencies of the President's Office that may not count with their own legal departments on the drafting of decrees, legislative bills, administrative decisions and legal messages.

The Legal and Technical Secretariat also oversees the Official Bulletin of the Argentine Republic, the national government's gazette. Since 7 April 2025, the Legal and Technical Secretary of the Presidency has been María Iberzábal Murphy, who serves under President Javier Milei.

It is one of (currently) three secretariats in the Argentine government counting with ministerial level, the other being the General Secretariat and the Secretariat of Communications and Press.

== Attributions and organization ==
The 1983 Law on Ministries (Spanish: Ley de Ministerios), decreed by Raúl Alfonsín, established eight secretariats reporting directly to the Office of the President tasked to delegate some of the President's direct responsibilities whilst aiding the head of state in the elaboration of public policies, among other responsibilities. These included the General Secretariat of the Presidency, the Planning Secretariat, the Intelligence Secretariat (SIDE, later disestablished and reformed into the AFI), the Media Secretariat, the Public Affairs Secretariat, the Science and Technology Secretariat, the Secretariat of Comprehensive Policies on Drugs (SEDRONAR) and the Habitat Secretariat. The Legal and Technical Undersecretariat operated under the scope of the General Secretariat until it was given its current status in February 1986.

== Headquarters ==
The Legal and Technical Secretariat is entirely headquartered in the Casa Rosada, the official working residence of the President of Argentina.

== List of secretaries ==
No.	Secretary	Party	Term	President
1	Jorge Luis Fernández Pastor	Independent	18 February 1986 – 5 May 1988	Raúl Alfonsín
2	Horacio Jorge Costa	Independent	5 May 1988 – 29 June 1989	Raúl Alfonsín
3	Raúl Granillo Ocampo	Justicialist Party	8 July 1989 – 25 February 1991	Carlos Menem
4	Jorge Luis Maiorano	Justicialist Party	25 February 1991 – 11 September 1992	Carlos Menem
5	Carlos Corach	Justicialist Party	11 September 1992 – 5 January 1995	Carlos Menem
6	Félix Borgonovo	Independent	5 January 1995 – 27 January 1998	Carlos Menem
7	Ginés Ruiz	Independent	27 January 1998 – 10 December 1999	Carlos Menem
8	Héctor Rodríguez	Independent	13 December 1999 – 15 June 2000	Fernando de la Rúa
9	Virgilio Loiácono	Independent	5 October 2000 – 23 December 2001	Fernando de la Rúa
10	Guillermo L'Huillier	Justicialist Party	23 December 2001 – 1 January 2002	Adolfo Rodríguez Saá
11	Antonio Arcuri	Justicialist Party	2 January 2002 – 25 May 2003	Eduardo Duhalde
12	Carlos Zannini	Justicialist Party	25 May 2003 – 10 December 2007	Néstor Kirchner
12	Carlos Zannini	Justicialist Party	10 December 2007 – 10 December 2015	Cristina Fernández de Kirchner
13	Pablo Clusellas	Republican Proposal	10 December 2015 – 10 December 2019	Mauricio Macri
14	Vilma Ibarra	Independent	10 December 2019 – 10 December 2023	Alberto Fernández
15	Javier Herrera Bravo	Independent	10 December 2023 – present	Javier Milei
