= Andrés Blanco (disambiguation) =

Andrés Blanco is a Venezuelan baseball player

Andrés Blanco can also refer to:

- Andrés Eloy Blanco, a Venezuelan poet and politician
- Andrés Eloy Blanco Municipality, Lara, a municipality of Lara State in Venezuela
- Andrés Blanco (Argentina), Argentine Trotskyist activist
- es:Andrés_Blanco_(Emprendedor), Spanish technology entrepreneur and businessman.
