= Andrés Eloy Blanco Municipality, Barinas =

Andrés Eloy Blanco Municipality Municipio Andrés Eloy Blanco
- Municipality
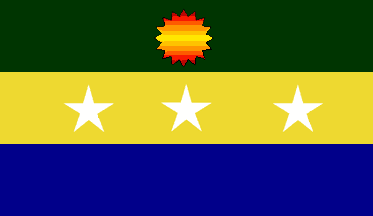
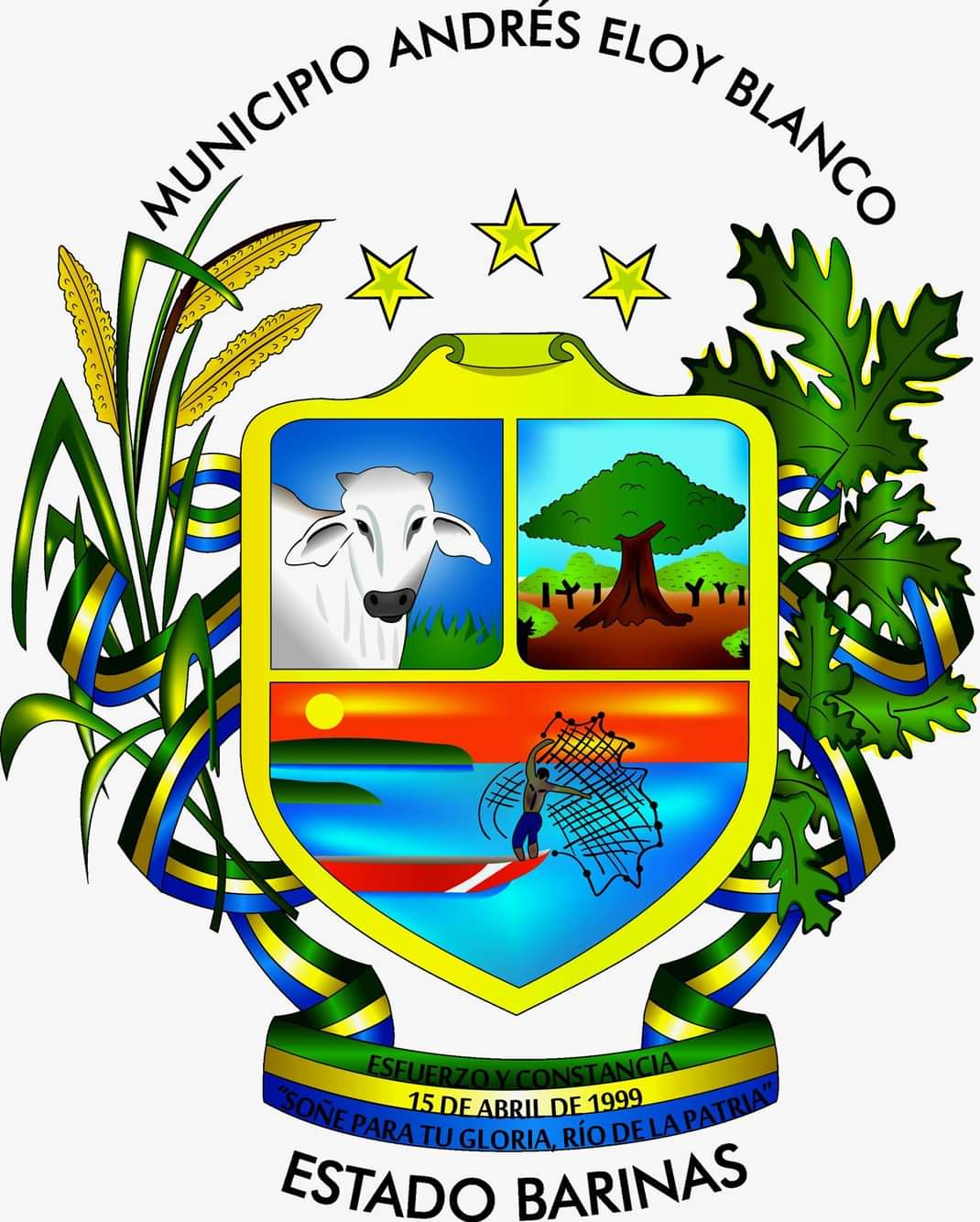
- Flag Coat of arms

- Location in Barinas

- Location in Venezuela
- Coordinates: 7°27′32″N 71°18′37″W
- Country: Venezuela
- State: Barinas

Government
  - Mayor: Wilson Doria Torres (PSUV)

Area
  - Total: 1,804.5 km^{2} (696.7 sq mi)

Population (2011)
  - Total: 16,144
  - Density: 8.9465/km^{2} (23.171/sq mi)
- Time zone: UTC−4 (VET)
- Area code(s): 0278
- Website: Official website

The Andrés Eloy Blanco Municipality is one of the 12 municipalities (municipios) that makes up the Venezuelan state of Barinas and, according to the 2011 census by the National Institute of Statistics of Venezuela, the municipality has a population of 16,144. The town of El Cantón is the shire town of the Andrés Eloy Blanco Municipality. The municipality is one of several in Venezuela named "Andrés Eloy Blanco Municipality" in honour of Venezuelan poet Andrés Eloy Blanco.

In 2008, it established a sister-relationship with Dane County, Wisconsin -- http://www.dane-andres.org/

== Demographics ==
The Andrés Eloy Blanco Municipality, according to a 2017 population estimate by the National Institute of Statistics of Venezuela, has a population of 18,816 (up from 15,847 in 2000). This amounts to 2.5% of the state's population. The municipality's population density is 12.6 inhabitants per square kilometre (33/sq mi).

== Government ==
The mayor of the Andrés Eloy Blanco Municipality is Zulay Martínez Fuentes, re-elected on October 31, 2004, with 69% of the vote. The municipality is divided into three parishes; El Cantón, Santa Cruz de Guacas, and Puerto Vivas.
