= Lara (state) =

Lara State Estado Lara
- State of Venezuela
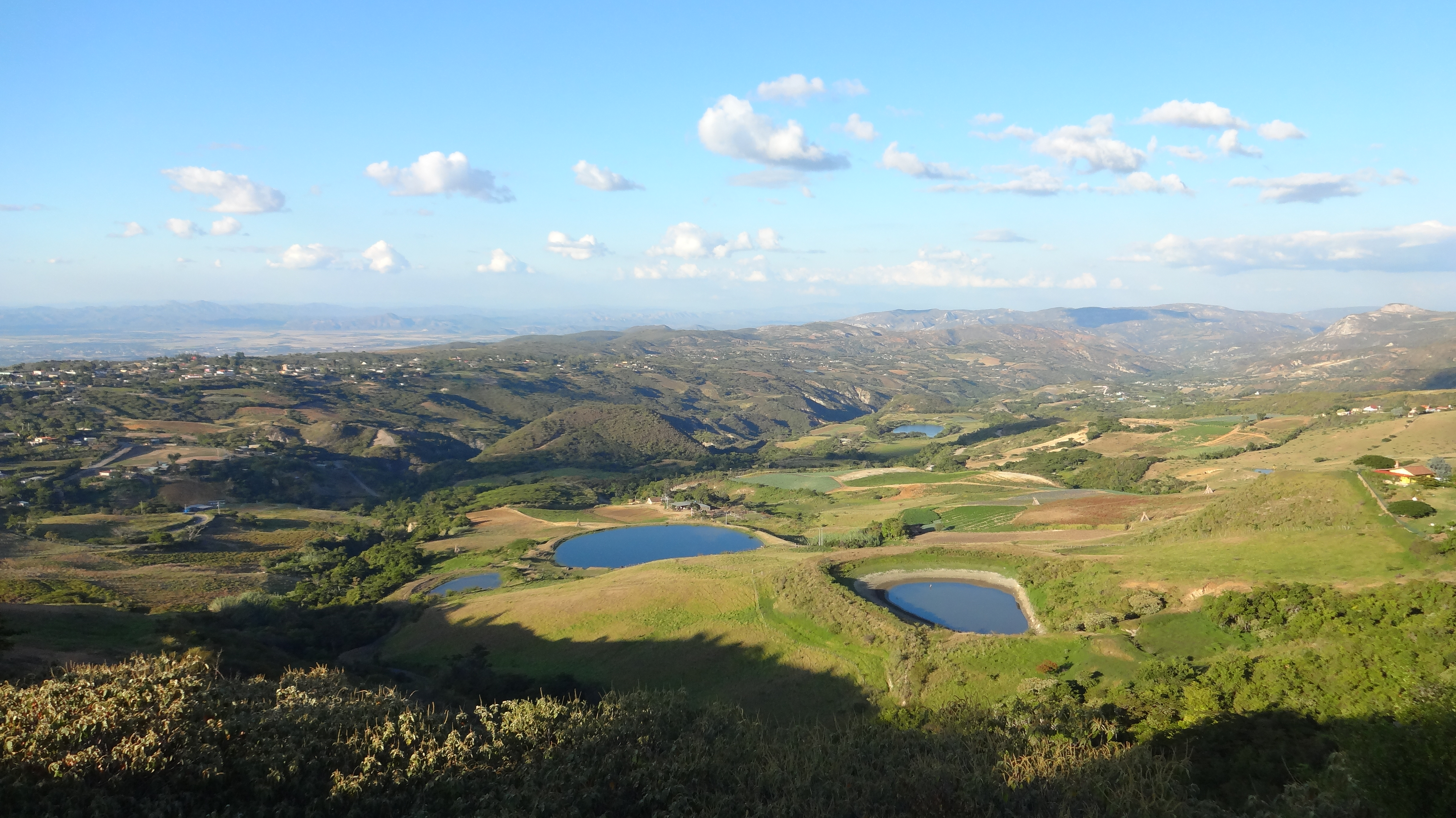
- View in Quíbor

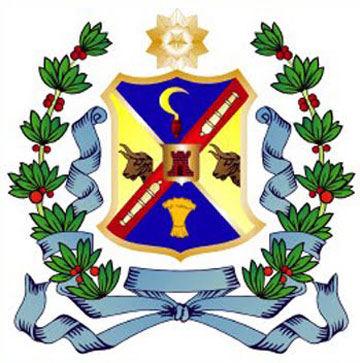
- Flag Coat of arms
- Anthem: Himno del Estado Lara
- Location within Venezuela
- Coordinates: 10.07°N 69.86°W
- Country: Venezuela
- Created: 1901
- Capital: Barquisimeto

Government
  - Body: Legislative Council
  - Governor: Luis Reyes Reyes

Area
  - Total: 19,800 km^{2} (7,600 sq mi)
  - Rank: 11th
- 2.15% of Venezuela

Population (2015 census)
  - Total: 2,019,211
  - Rank: 5th
- 6,75% of Venezuela
- Time zone: UTC−4 (VET)
- ISO 3166 code: VE-K
- Emblematic tree: Semeruco (Malpighia glabra)
- HDI (2019): 0.691 medium · 16th of 24
- Website: www.lara.gob.ve

Lara State (Spanish: Estado Lara, IPA: [esˈtaðo ˈlaɾa]) is one of the 23 states of Venezuela. Lara is located in the Central-Western Region, Venezuela. The state capital is Barquisimeto.

Lara State covers a total surface area of 19,800 km^{2} (7,600 sq mi) and, in 2015, had a census population of 2,019,211.

== Toponymy ==
The state is named after a notable hero of Venezuela's independence, General Jacinto Lara.

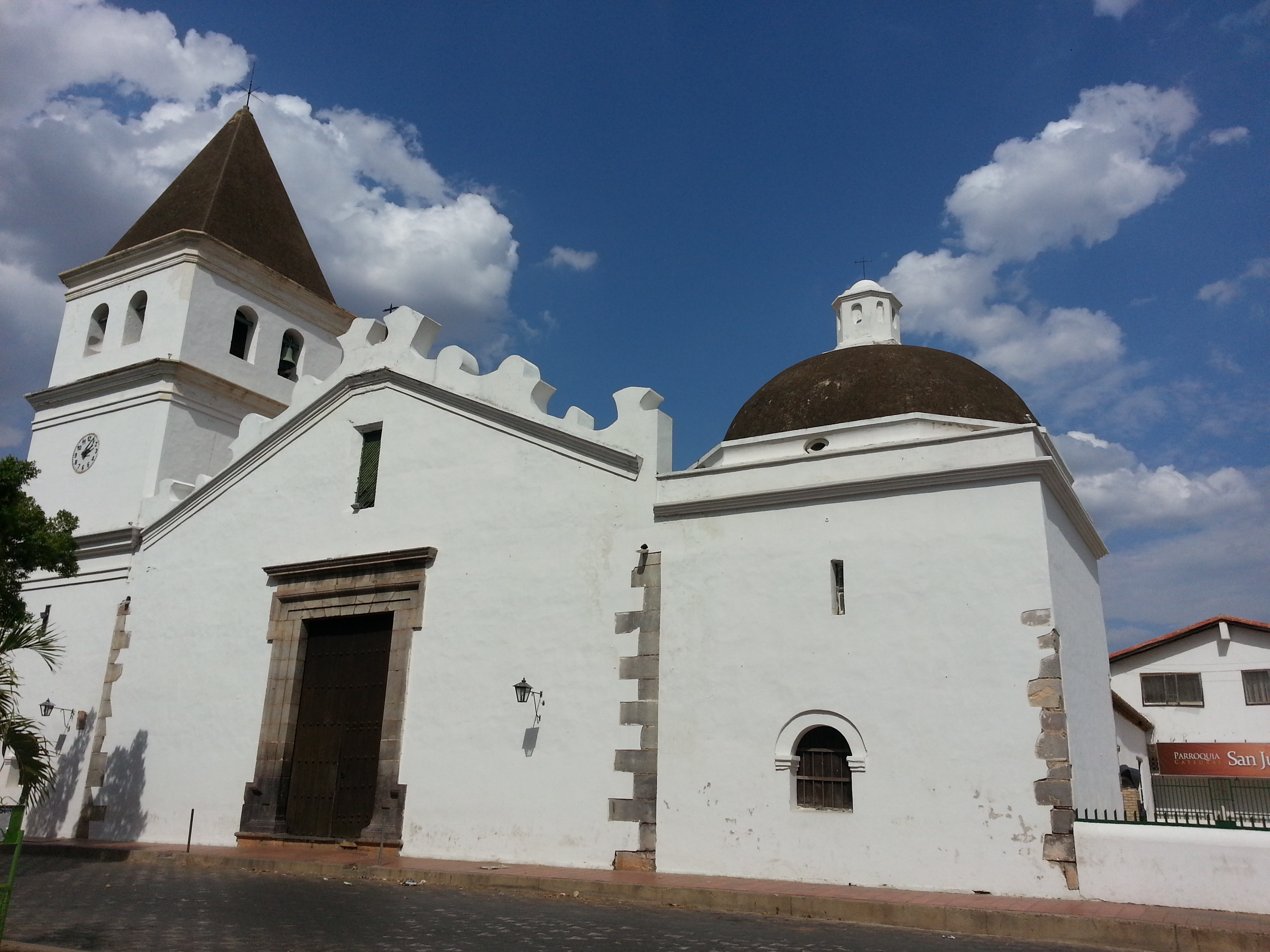
St. John the Baptist Cathedral, Carora. Built in the early 1600s, the building was already active in 1658,

== History ==
During the colony and a large part of the independence period, the current territory of Lara belonged to the province of Caracas. In 1824, it was absorbed by the Province of Carabobo, created that year. In 1832, after the disintegration of the Great Colombia, the region was disintegrated; it was then constituted in the Province of Barquisimeto, which included the cantons of Quíbor, El Tocuyo, Carora and Barquisimeto; besides others that conform today the state of Yaracuy. In 1856, through the new law of territorial division, San Felipe and Yaritagua joined Nirgua to form the Province of Yaracuy. It is in these towns, mainly in El Tocuyo and Barquisimeto, where the first lights of Venezuelan Independence were documented, and from which the construction of Venezuela was undertaken with the towns, cities and roads that unite the great part of this territory. It is also worth noting that the cattle that were taken to the Llanos were the Tocuyo cattle.

In 1881, the creation of the Great State of the North of the West was agreed upon, to which the areas of Lara and Yaracuy were added. In August of that same year, the state was given the name Lara, in honor of the patriot General Jacinto Lara. In 1899, the Congress established the autonomy of the 20 states, as contemplated in the 1864 constitution, a division that was confirmed in 1909, through a constitutional reform, which has been maintained until today.

In 1899, the territory corresponding to the current municipalities Silva and Monseñor Iturriza of the state of Falcon were integrated into the latter state in exchange for what today is the municipality Urdaneta.

=== Prehistory ===
When the Europeans arrived in Venezuela, the region that is now Lara was inhabited by various ethnic groups such as the gayones, ayomanes and coyones. These peoples spoke, according to what anthropologists have been able to reconstruct from Spanish sources, languages of the Jirajarana linguistic family. The valleys of Quíbor, Barquisimeto and El Tocuyo had a relatively high population density and the peoples of the region practiced agriculture.

=== Spanish Conquest and Colonization ===
The Augsburg Welser expeditions were very destructive for the region. From 1529 to the 1940s the German conquerors carried out massacres of entire villages and tried to enslave the remaining indigenous people. Several of the first permanent populations of Europeans settled here because of the fertility of the region and the availability of indigenous labour. Thus, towns such as El Tocuyo, Quíbor, Cuara and Cubiro were founded.

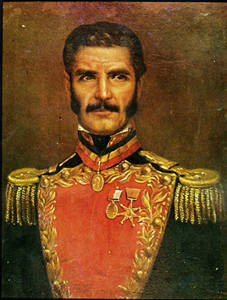
General Jacinto Lara

The Welser administration was in permanent conflict with the interests of the Spaniards, who accused them of failing to carry out the task of colonization, among other things. In 1545, Juan de Carvajal, who lived in Coro, went with several families of colonists to the area of El Tocuyo and there he began to distribute the natives according to the encomienda system. El Tocuyo became one of the most important axes of the Venezuelan economy and also the center of operations of the Spanish conquest in the territory. During the colony, the current Lara territory belonged to the province of Caracas. The region of El Tocuyo and Barquisimeto had convents that offered education to the inhabitants at a higher level than in other regions of Venezuela.

During the 17th century, El Tocuyo developed a school of painting that was in contact with that of Quito. By the 18th century the area of Lara was an important producer of wheat, which was exported to Mexico.

=== Independent Venezuela ===
Lara in 1879-1909

In 1824, it was absorbed by the Province of Carabobo, created that year. In 1832, after the disintegration of Gran Colombia, the region was disbanded; it was then constituted in the Province of Barquisimeto, which included the cantons of Quíbor, El Tocuyo, Carora and Barquisimeto; in addition to others that today make up the state of Yaracuy. In 1856, through the new law of territorial division, San Felipe and Yaritagua joined Nirgua to form the Province of Yaracuy.

In 1881, it was agreed to create the Great State of the North of the West, to which the areas of Lara and Yaracuy were added. In August of that same year the name of Lara State was assigned in honor of the patriot General Jacinto Lara. In 1899,12 the Congress established the autonomy of the 20 states, as contemplated in the 1864 constitution, a division that was confirmed in 1909, through a constitutional reform, which has been maintained until today. Until 1899, this state had access to the sea with the populations of Tucacas and Chichiriviche, currently belonging to the state of Falcon. In fact, the population of Tucacas was the main port of export of copper extracted from the mines of Aroa.

== Geography ==
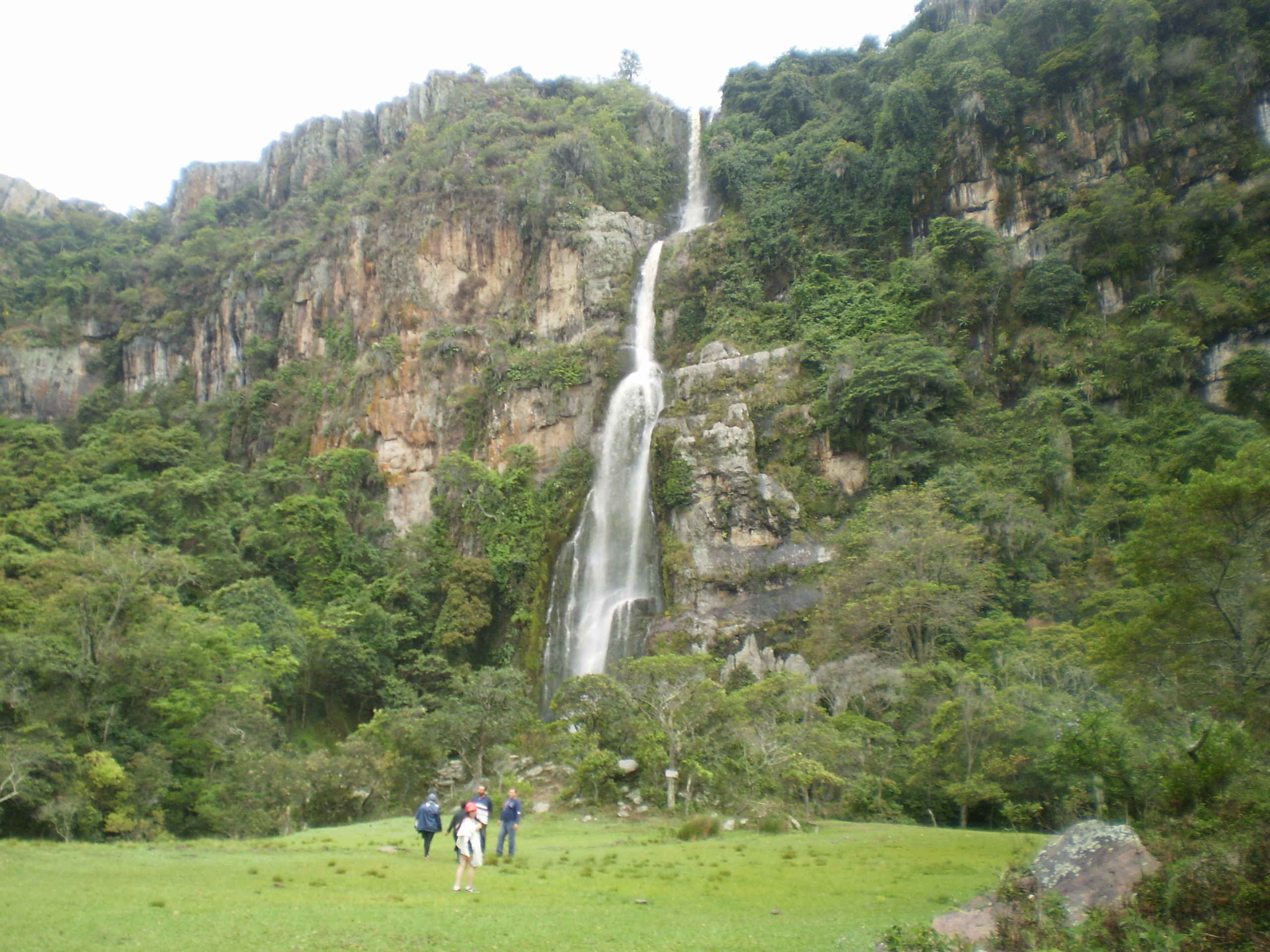
Cascada del Vino (Wine Waterfall), Lara State

Lara borders Falcón to the north, Yaracuy to the east, Cojedes to the southeast, Portuguesa and Trujillo to the south, and Zulia to the west.

The state has an area of 19,800 square kilometers (7,600 square miles) which represents 2.15% of the national territory, making it the 11th largest Venezuelan state. The area of Lara is split between two of the eight natural regions of Venezuela. The northern half of the state lies within the Coro region, and the southern half is located in the Andean region.

Lara contains 6 distinct ecoregions: the Catatumbo moist forests, the Maracaibo dry forests, the Venezuelan Andes montane forests, the Paraguana xeric scrub, the Lara-Falcón dry forests, and the Llanos.

=== Terrain ===
Lara's topography consist of high plains and low, broken hills, with a relatively hot and dry climate. Lara depression is located at altitudes between 1,600 and 2,600 ft (487 to 792 m). Among the landscapes of moderate height, the pressures of Carora, Barquisimeto and Yaracuy stand out, while the Sierra de Aroa, the Nirgua Massif and the Andean buttress present more broken reliefs. The Barquisimeto high plateau is a privileged place for human settlement, commerce and communications, while the valley of the turbid river allows for intense agricultural use, in contrast to the aridity of the surrounding xerophytic vegetation. It is integrated by the last foothills of the Venezuelan Andes System, located in the south and southwest of the state respectively. The highest peak in the state is located in the Cordillera de Mérida, at 3,585 m above sea level.

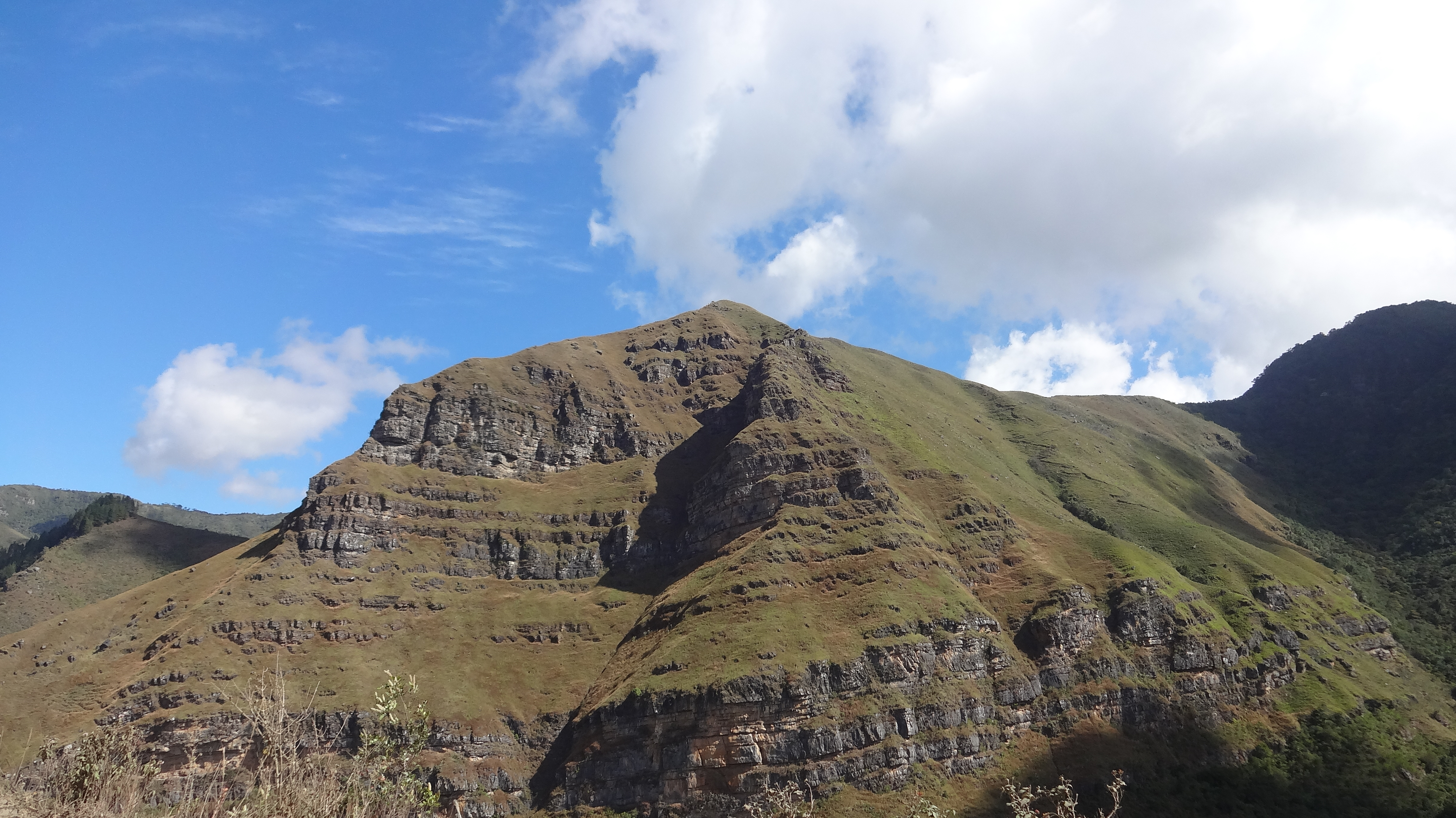
Humocaro Mountains, Lara State

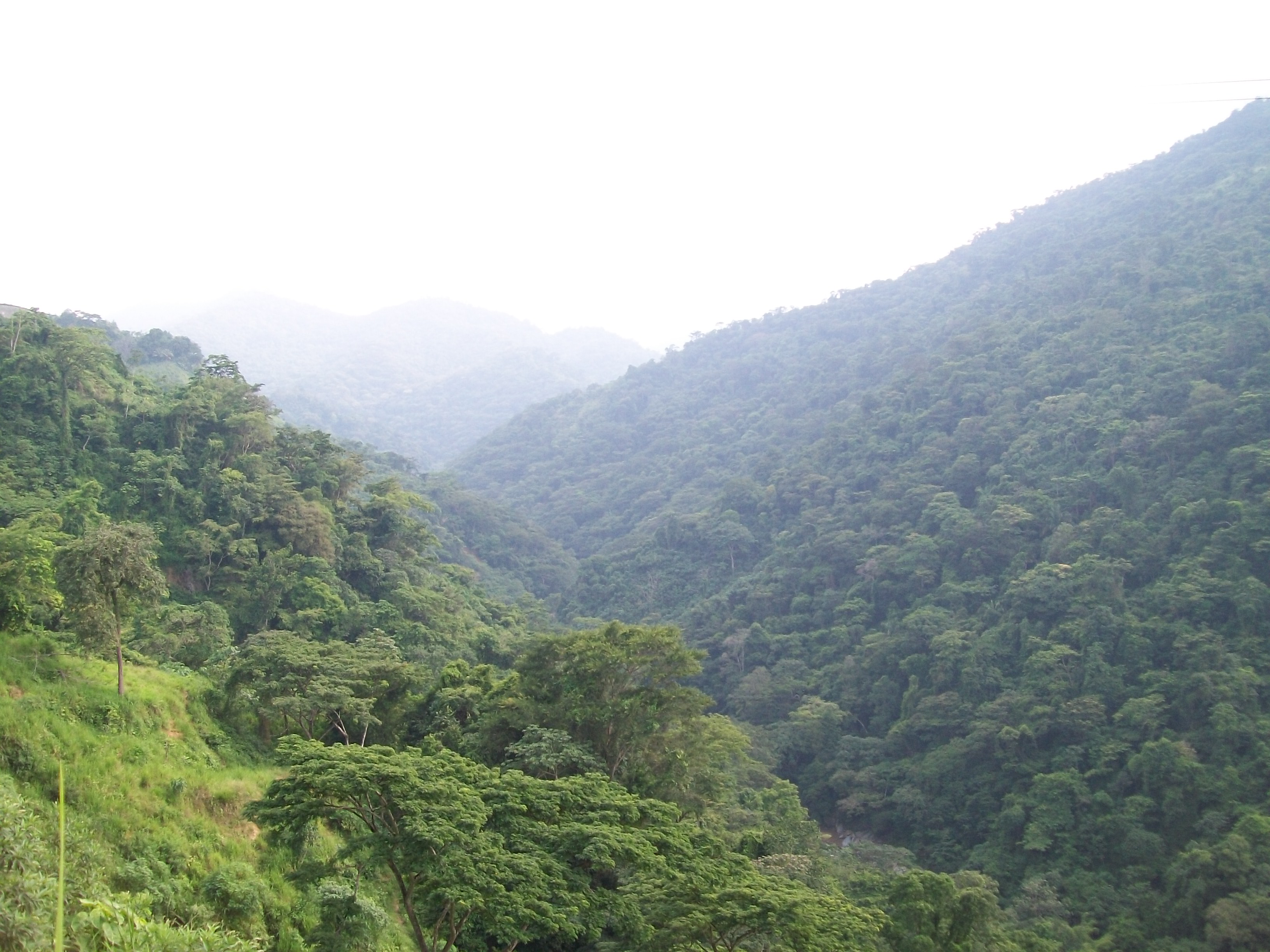
Vegetation-covered mountainous landscape in Lara State

=== Climate ===
Two types of climate prevail in Lara state: Tropical, Mountain, and also dry and very dry, followed by wet mountain. Mountain humid climates are low and humid paramero just 4.8% of estadal area. The dry atmosphere is typical, since evaporation exceeds precipitation, reaching until 650 mm of annual average, with rain falling at different times according to geographycal location..

The average annual temperature fluctuates between 19 °C (66,2 °F) and 29 °C (84,2 °F), with an average of 24 °C (75,2 °F) in the capital, Barquisimeto.

The climate tends to vary between cold moor (in mountainous areas) and semi-arid tropical dry climate (specific in the area of the Lara's Depression, where the city of Carora and surrounding populations are located).

In general, the climate tends to vary between cold moorland (in the mountainous areas) and dry semi-arid tropical climate (mainly in the area of the Larense Depression where the city of Carora and surrounding towns are located).

The tropical steppe climate (semi-arid) is located specifically towards the northern part of the states of Zulia and Falcón, the Lara-Falcón depression, the central coastal zone, the coastal areas of the Unare depression and part of the state of Sucre, towards the Gulf of Cariaco, and a large part of the island of Margarita.

=== Soils ===
About 60% of the land in the west of Lara State is mountainous and presents soils of slow permeability, fine texture, reddish color and commonly acid reaction. They have a low organic matter content and low fertility.

To the southeast of Carora the soils are stony, without a well developed profile, variable permeability, acid reaction, fast runoff and strong erosion. In the area corresponding to the beaches the low permeability, the flooding, the predominant clayey texture and the appreciable content of salts limit their use. Erosion is present throughout the area and the hills near the beaches present a critical physiognomy. In the Barquisimeto Depression, the soils of the flat areas are very variable.

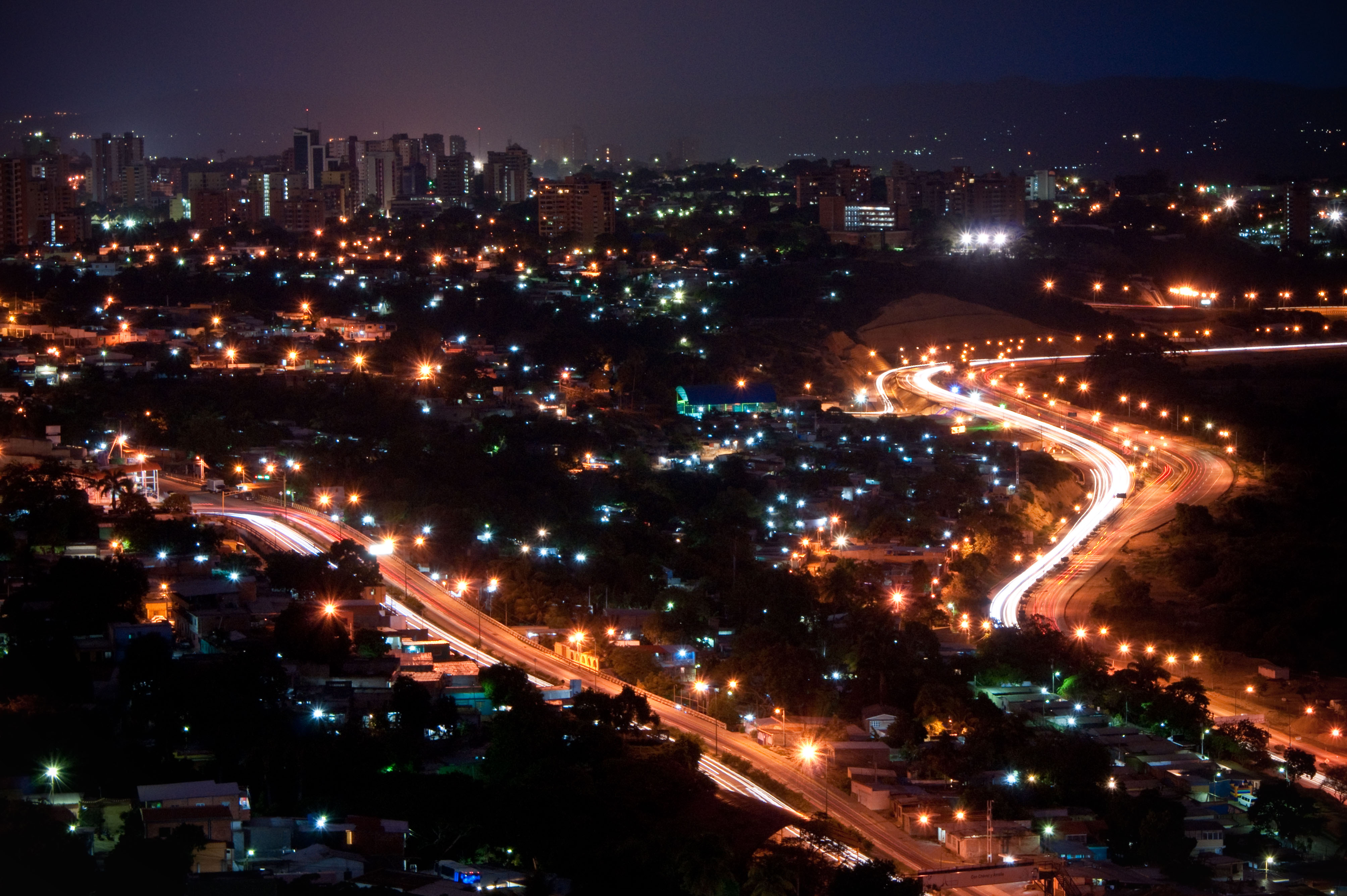
Barquisimeto, the state capital

=== Hydrography ===
The waters of the state's rivers flow from three different sources: the Caribbean, the Atlantic through the Orinoco River and Lake Maracaibo.

Main rivers: Amarillo, Auro, Aragua, Curarigua, Morere, Tocuyo, Turbio, Urama, Yacambú.

Lagoons: Laguna Amarilla, Laguna Cocoy.

Wine waterfall in the Dinira National Park

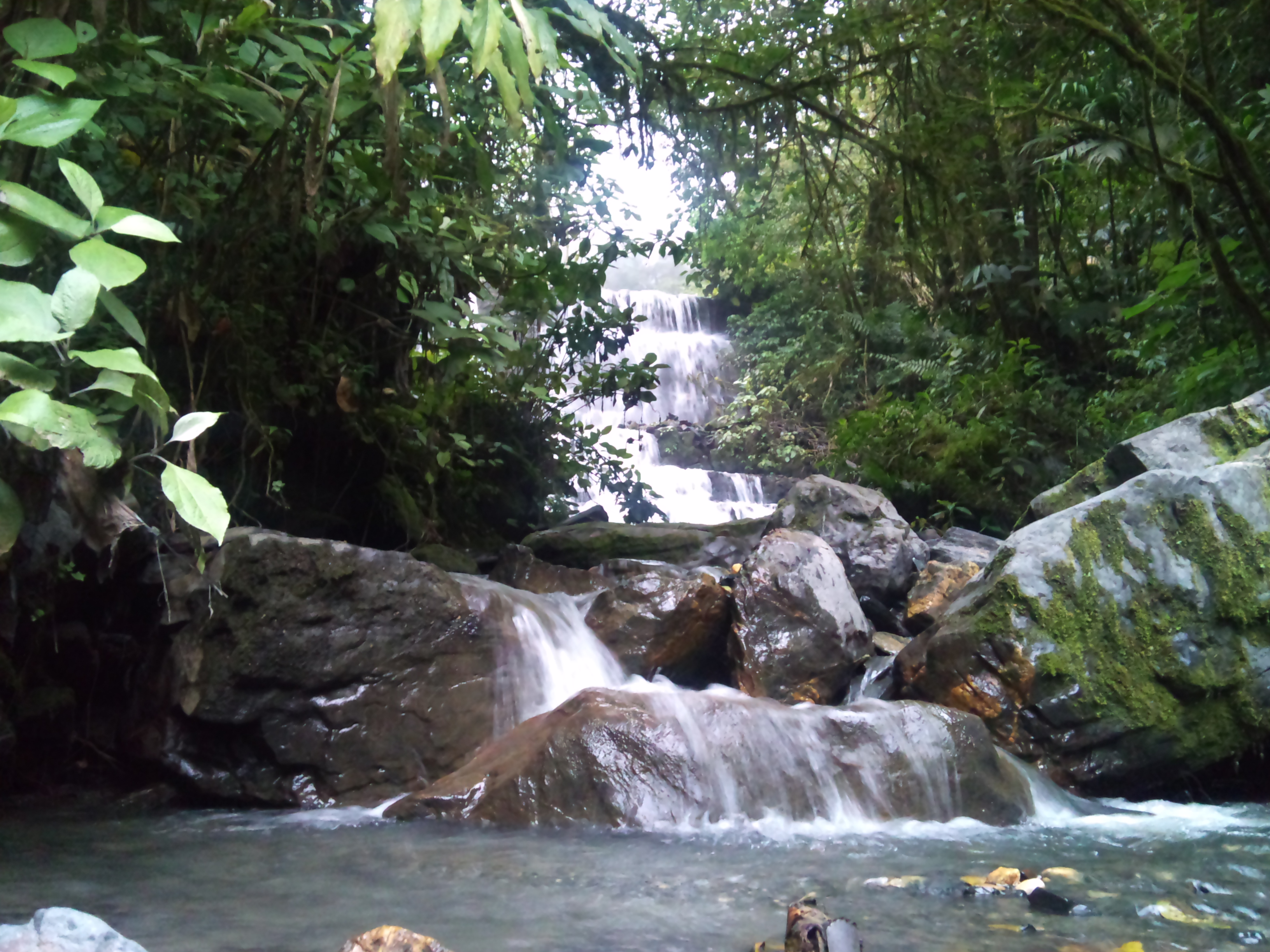
El Blanquito Waterfall, Yacambu National Park

== Politics and government ==
As a state it is autonomous and equal in political terms to its peers, it organizes its administration and public powers through a Constitution of the Lara State, dictated by the Legislative Council.

Like the other 23 federal entities of Venezuela, the State maintains its own police force, which is supported and complemented by the National Police and the Venezuelan National Guard.

=== Executive power ===
Executive authority consists of the Governor of Lara State and a group of State Secretaries of his confidence who are officials of free appointment and removal. The Governor is elected by the people through direct, universal and secret vote for a period of four years and with the possibility of continuous re-election for new periods, being in charge of the state administration. The Governor must render an annual account of his actions before the regional parliament called the Legislative Council of Lara State. The current governor is Adolfo Pereira Antique of the PSUV. He succeeded Carmen Meléndez, who served from 2017–21.

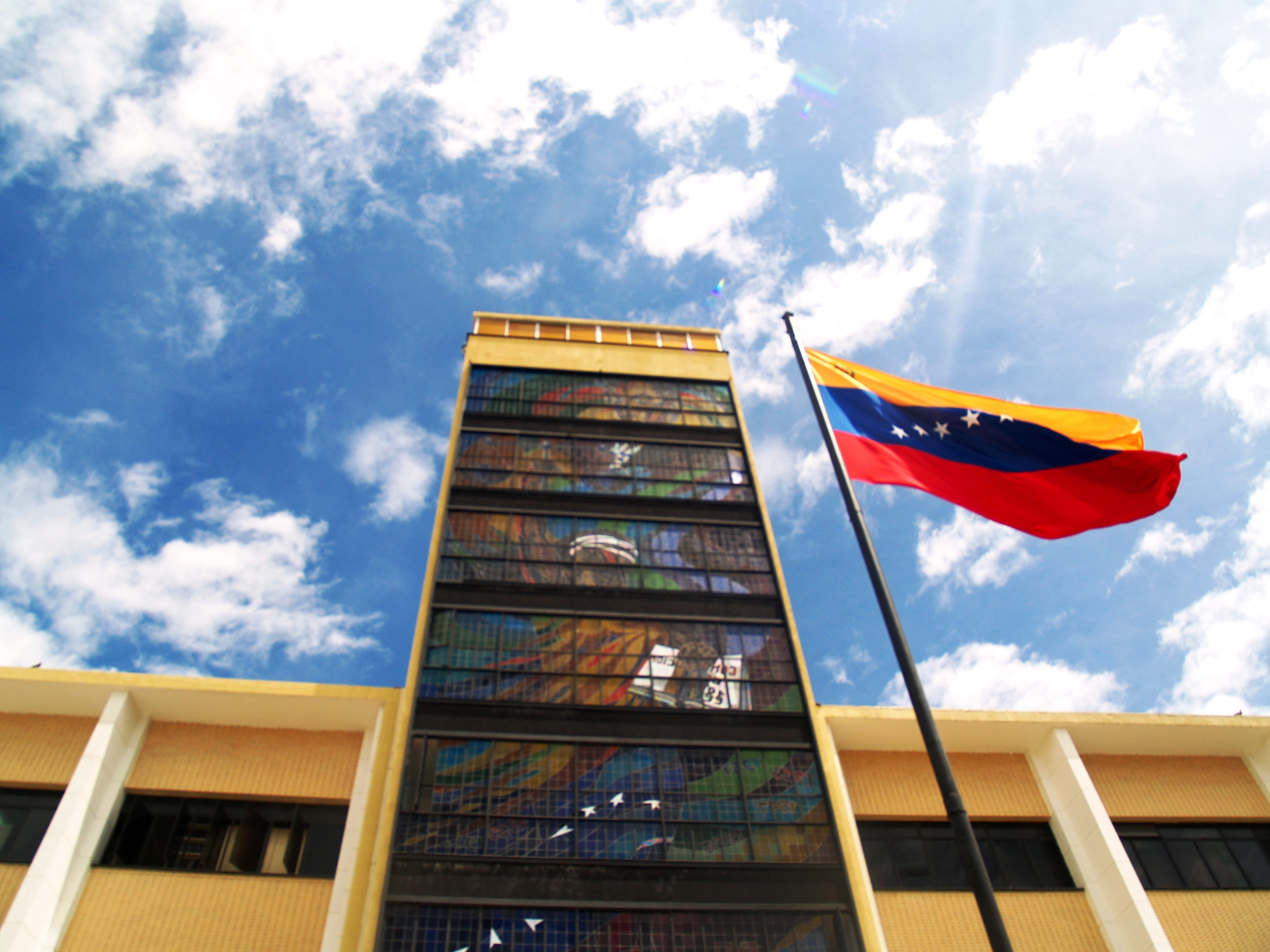
Palace of Justice in Barquisimeto

=== Legislative branch ===
The state legislature is the responsibility of the Legislative Council of Lara State, a unicameral parliament elected by the people through direct, universal and secret vote every four years. The legislature can be reelected for consecutive periods, under a system of proportional representation of the population of the state and its municipalities. Its headquarters are located in the Legislative Palace of Lara State, in the city of Barquisimeto.

== Demography ==
Historical population
Year	Pop.	±% p.a.
1873	143,818	—
1881	176,079	+2.56%
1891	189,624	+0.74%
1920	219,816	+0.51%
1926	271,369	+3.57%
1936	291,230	+0.71%
1941	332,975	+2.72%
1950	368,169	+1.12%
1961	489,140	+2.62%
1971	671,410	+3.22%
1981	945,064	+3.48%
1990	1,193,161	+2.62%
2001	1,556,415	+2.45%
2011	1,774,867	+1.32%
Source: "XIV CENSO NACIONAL DE POBLACIÓN Y VIVIENDA - Resultados por Entidad Federal y Municipio del Estado Lara" (PDF). Instituto Nacional de Estadística.

=== Population ===
According to the 2011 Census, the population was 1,774,867.

Municipality	Population
Andrés Eloy Blanco	47,245
Crespo	49,958
Iribarren	996,230
Jiménez	100,997
Morán	123,880
Palavecino	174,099
Simón Planas	35,802
Torres	185,275
Urdaneta	61,381

== Municipalities and municipal seats ==
Municipality	Seat
Andrés Eloy Blanco	Sanare
Crespo	Duaca
Iribarren	Barquisimeto
Jiménez	Quíbor
Morán	El Tocuyo
Palavecino	Cabudare
Simón Planas	Sarare
Torres	Carora
Urdaneta	Siquisique

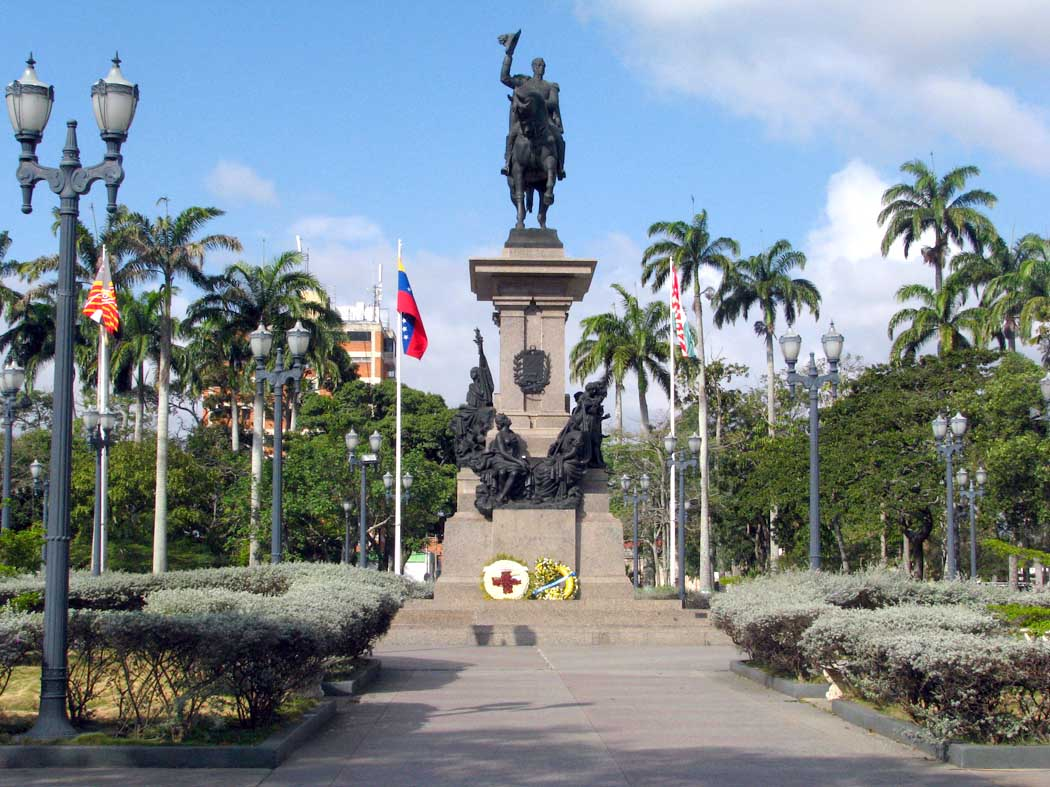
Ayacucho Park, Iribarren Municipality

== Economy ==
Sugarcane cultivation is a major agricultural activity, making Lara one of Venezuela's leading sugar-producing state. Other significant crips include coffee, potatoes, tomatoes, beans, corn, and banana, while local grape cultivation supports the state's wine industry. Livestock farming encompasses cattle, pigs, goats, sheep and poultry, supporting a regional cheese and dairy sector. Beyond agriculture, the state maintains significant industrial capacity and manufacturing zones, alongside an economy supported by traditional handicrafts and cultural and nature-based tourism.

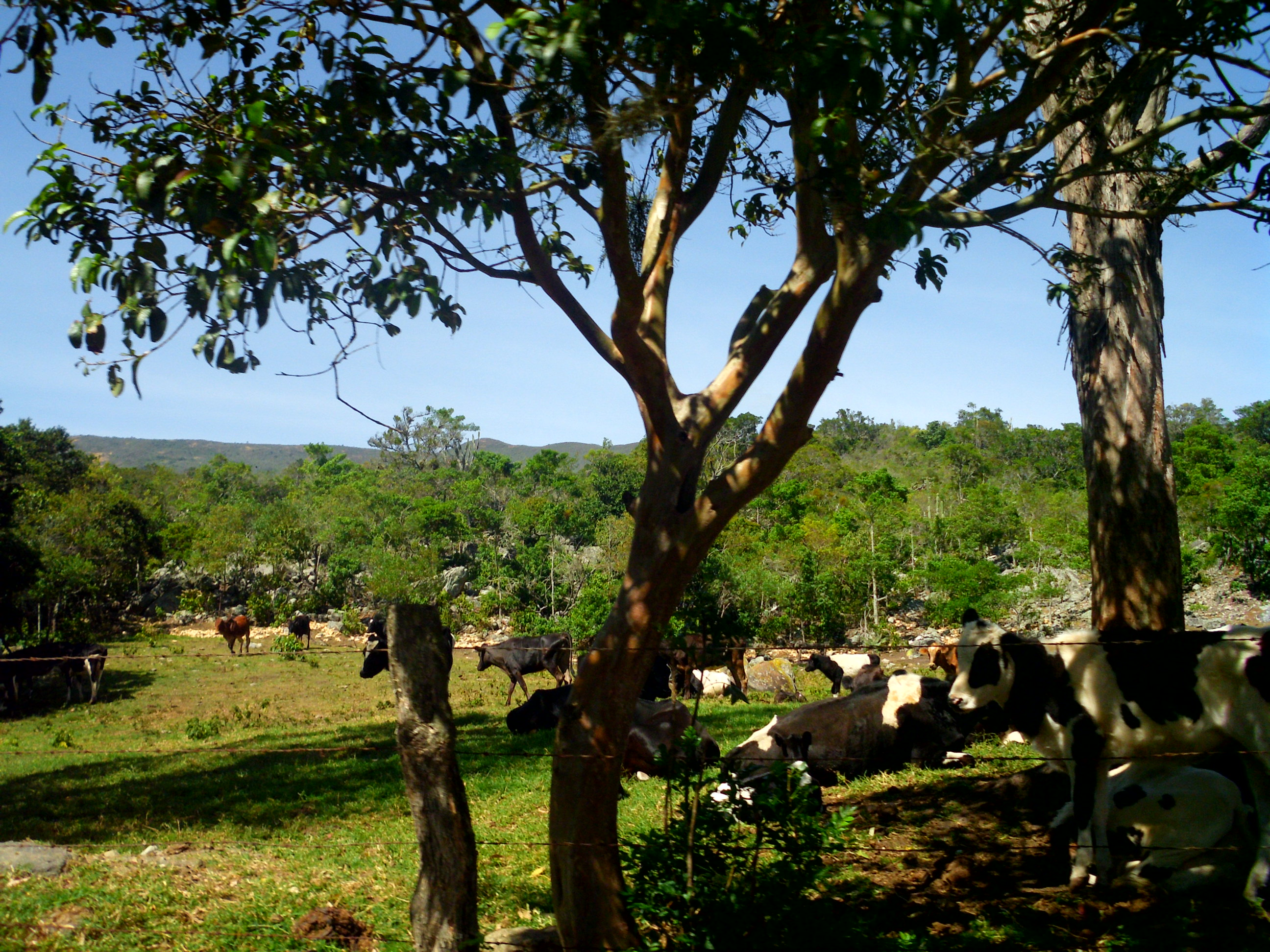
Cattle in La Peonia, Lara State

Among the most important industries in the state of Lara are the metalworking (Turbio's steel industry, SIDETUR; food processing, clothing apparel, textile printing and processing (based sisal fiber) sector. The most manufacturing are in the small and medium industry because, except for its sugar mills, Almost all its industrial park consists of companies of less than two hundred workers.

More than 50% of the population is concentrated in the capital (Barquisimeto) where the main commercial, financial and industrial activities are located. Despite the dynamism that has reached, places the entity as one of the most important recipients of migratory flows in the country, which has also reached urban centers such as: Carora, Quibor, El Tocuyo, Cubiro, Cabudare and Duaca; which base the economy in agricultural activities.

- Agricultural: Coffee and sugar cane, onions, corn, cambur, sisal, onions, tomatoes, grapes, sugar cane, caraotas, pineapples, and coffee.
- Breeding: poultry, cattle, goats, sheep and pigs.
- Fishing: catfish, bigheaded, permit,
- Industrial: Cement, food products, alcoholic and soft drinks, steel and metal products, tools and equipment, ropes and bags, musical instruments

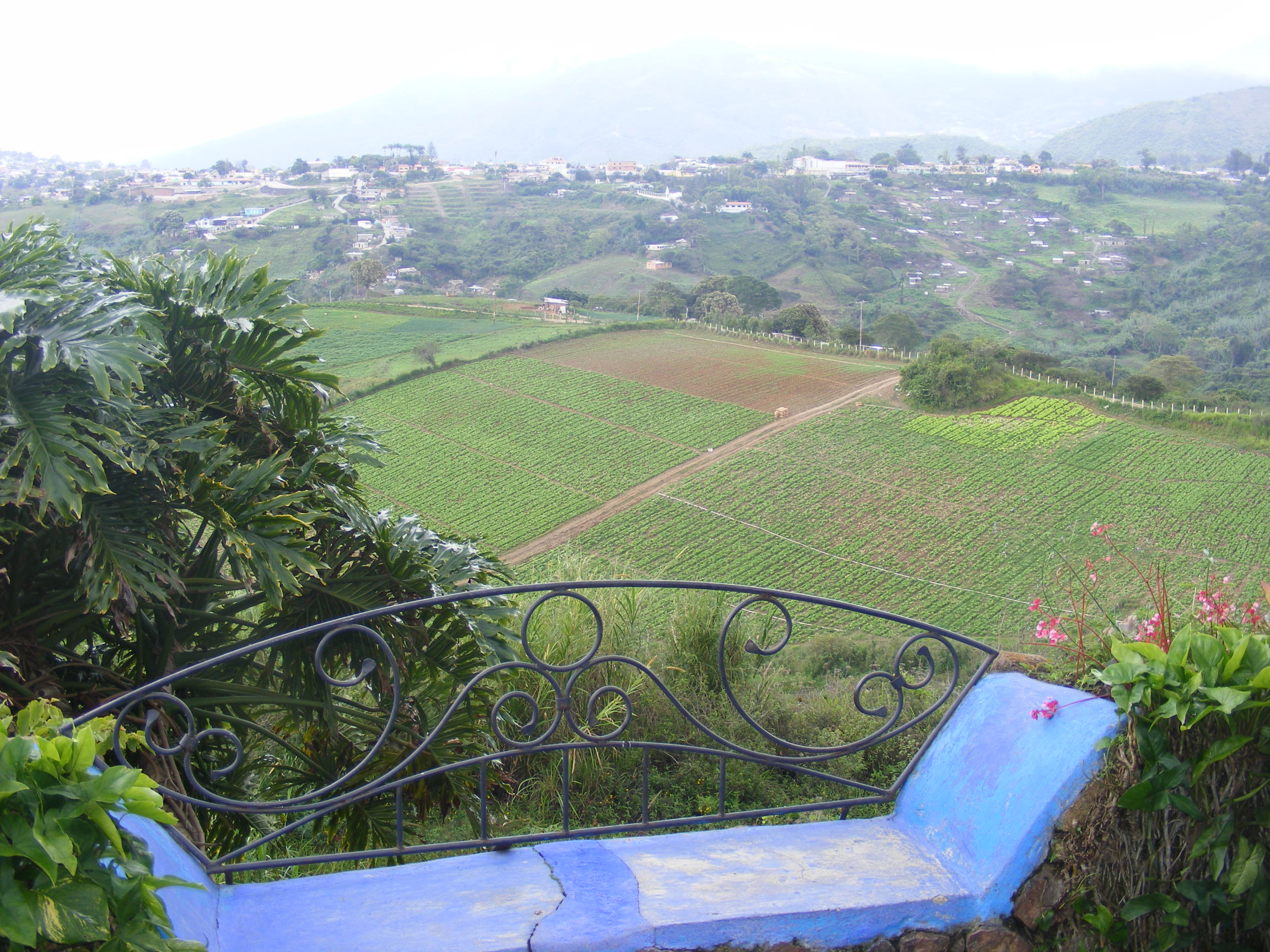
View of the agricultural fields in Sanare, Lara State

- Livestock: Cattle, pigs, goats, sheep and poultry.
- Forest Resources: Cují, naked Indian, jabillo, jobo, olive tree, semeruco and vera.
- Mineral Resources: Refractory clays, silicic sands, limestone, iron, mercury, phyllites.

Lara, located in the commercial corridors that link the West, the Andes, the center and the east of the country, is an important receiver and distributor of foodstuffs to other regions inside and outside Venezuela (export) through the wholesale market that commercializes a third of the fresh food consumed in the country, Mercabar.

Considered since 1950 to be one of the Venezuelan cities least dependent on oil, agriculture and trade are the main economic activities in the region that contributes: 22% of coffee, 26% of sugar cane, 90% of pineapple, 31% of grapes, 54% of onions, 12% of tomatoes, 54% of paprika, 29% of cabbage, 100% of sisal and 22% of potatoes.

However, today only around 25 thousand hectares are irrigated due to the lack of water, which could change radically with the completion of the Yacambú hydraulic project and the hydraulic works for the Urdaneta and Torres municipalities, infrastructures that would provide around 60 hectares of arable land in the central north of the state.

From the industrial point of view, in the state of Lara this type of activity is concentrated in the city of Barquisimeto, which has industrial zones of important magnitude and production capacity.

Important administrative and public service activities are concentrated in the state metropolis of Barquisimeto, together with all kinds of commerce, banking and financial entities, due to its strategic location on the road network in the West of the country, and with its railway connection to Puerto Cabello and Acarigua. Equally important are the position as the hub of transport and storage companies. In addition, there are metal-mechanic, agri-industrial and textile industrial establishments, both in the city and in its immediate surroundings, such as cement plants, sugar mills, milk processing plants and others.

=== Agriculture ===
Of special relevance are the agricultural activities, especially the cultivation of sugar cane in the valleys of the rivers Tocuyo, Turbio and various regions; of specialized horticulture of onions, peppers and tomatoes in Quibor; of viticulture in Carora and El Tocuyo; of sisal and coconutcommerce between the central and western parts of Venezuela. It also serves as the centre of a large agricultural area that produces sisal, cacao, cattle, sugarcane, and coffee, as well as subsistence crops, along with pineapple, in the dry areas. In the highlands, coffee, potatoes and vegetables thrive. Important are the cattle activities, as much of the modern milk cattle ranch, like of the traditional cattle ranch of goats. Various types of tourism are taking on increasing significance, with emphasis on the expansion of the rich Larense craftsmanship in places like Guadalupe and Tintorero.

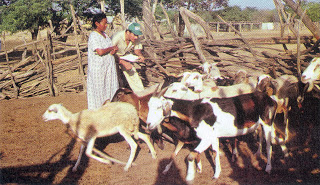
Caprine Farms, Lara

== Tourism ==
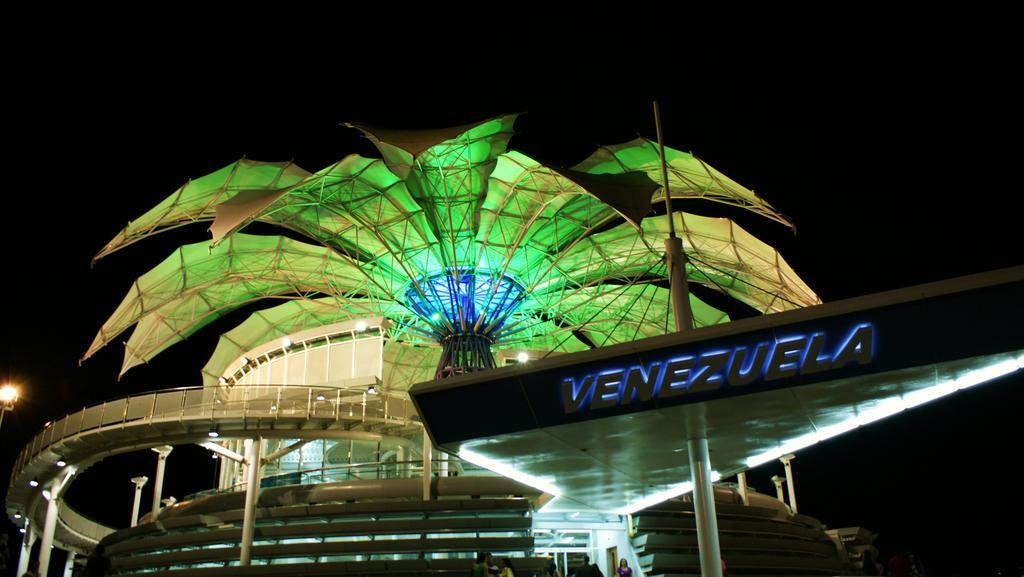
Flor de Venezuela (Flower of Venezuela), Lara State

=== National parks ===
There are five national parks in the territory of Lara State:

- Yacambú National Park: The park covers an area of 146 square kilometers and was established in 1962 to protect part of the Yacambú River basin.
- Cerro Saroche National Park: With an area of 320 square kilometers, it was established in December 1989 in the municipalities of Torres, Jiménez and Iribarren.
- Terepaima National Park: It has 189 square kilometers and was established in April 1976 to protect the fauna and flora around the Sarare River and Fila Terepaima.
- Dinira National Park: It covers an area of 453.28 square kilometers, established in 1988 to protect the upper basin of the Tocuyo River.
- El Guache National Park: It covers an area of 122 square kilometers and was established in 1993 to protect the upper basins of the Guache, Ospino and other nearby rivers.

=== Historical sites ===
- Monument to Los Horcones: On July 22, 1813, one of the battles undertaken by the liberator Simón Bolívar took place, in it Major General Jacinto Lara also participated, but the one who is covered with glory in that battle is General Florencio Jiménez, accompanied by his partner José Félix Ribas.
- Ateneo de Barquisimeto: It was created under the principle of rescuing the culture of the city, on October 8, 1986.
- The Obelisk: Without a doubt, it is the most representative icon of the state of Lara. It is located to the west of the city of Barquisimeto (capital of the state) which was built in the year 1952, on the occasion of the 400 years of its foundation. The structure is based mainly on concrete and steel, has an elevator and measures 75 meters high. Although it is not an obelisk, that is what the citizens of Barquisimeto call it.

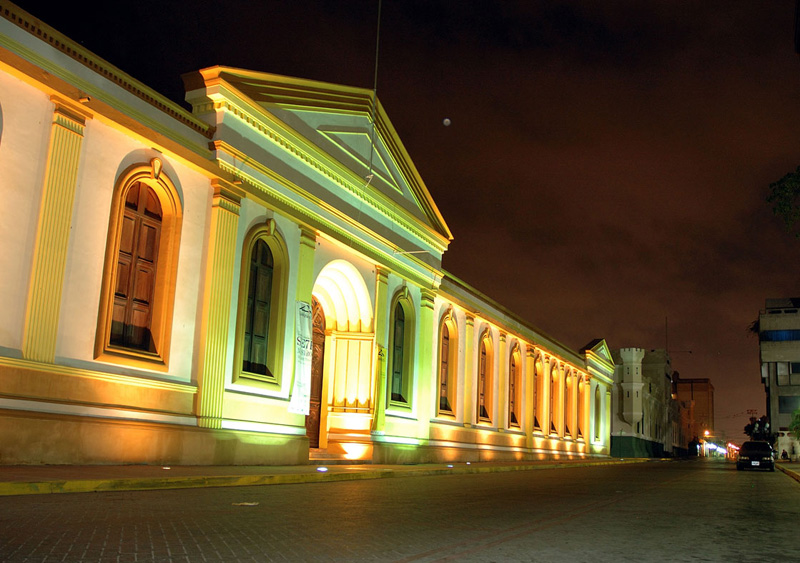
Barquisimeto Museum

- Teatro Juares: Located in the entire centre of the city of Barquisimeto, the Municipal Theatre was inaugurated in 1905. With more than 100 years, it has undergone several reforms, and has become a cultural icon for the city, where shows and cultural events are held, which is also attractive to tourists.
- Ayacucho Park: Park built under the regime of General Gomez, has an area of four (4) hectares and a monument to Marshal Antonio Jose de Sucre, was the first park in Latin America with access for cars.
- Carora's historical center: in this one there are old houses belonging to the founding families of the city, the Cathedral San Juan Bautista, the church El Calvario, the walk the heroes, among others.

=== Museums ===
- Larense History Museum: Contains archaeological objects belonging to the culture that settled near Quibor, in addition to paintings, mummies and private collections. It is located in a large colonial house in front of the old cathedral of Barquisimeto.
- La Salle Museum: It contains samples of archeology, paleontology and natural sciences. Among them are funerary pieces, ceramics and objects from the first cultures existing in Venezuelan territory. There are several mega-materials, one of which is larger than the one on display in Paris. There are also ammonites from the secondary period, mastodon tusks, molars of antediluvian animals, as well as marine fossils and a great variety of embalmed animals. Located in La Salle School in Barquisimeto

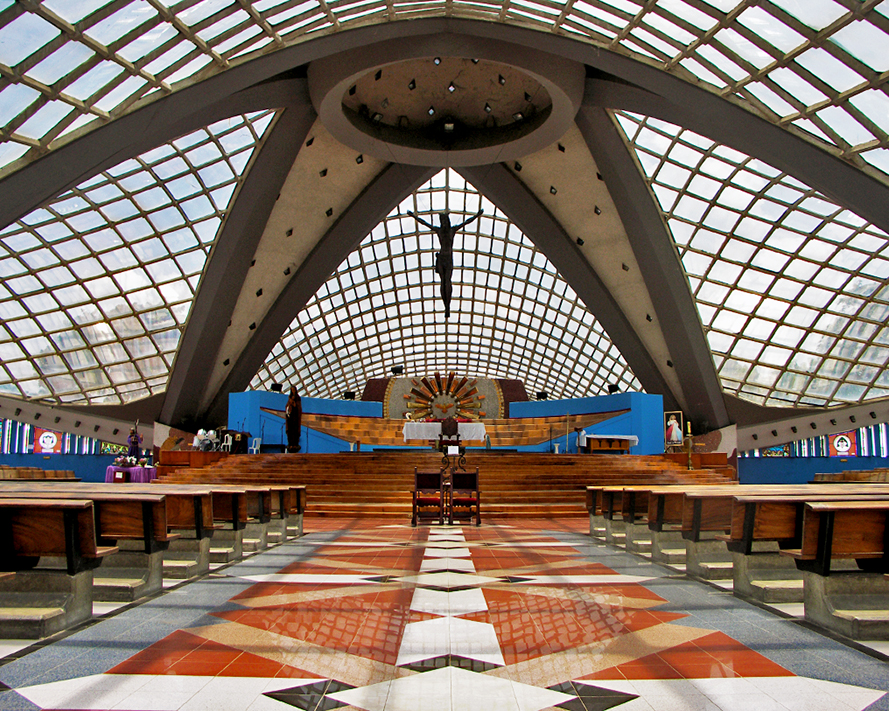
Metropolitan Cathedral of Barquisimeto

- Anthropological Museum: It has a large number of fossilized skeletons dating from about two thousand years BC, as well as ceramics, necklaces, earrings (made from seashells), arrowheads, musical instruments, anthropomorphic and zoomorphic figures, all pieces of great historical value. The skeletons of pygmies range in size from 1.46 m to 1.50 m, with men standing out because they are taller than women, although both are characterized by deformed skulls due to flattening or elongation of the back. It is located on the Boulevard de Quíbor.
- Colonial Museum: Founded on the four hundredth anniversary of the city. It keeps precious colonial relics and a great amount of documents and costumes from different periods. It is located in the Tocuyo.
- Doña Emilia Rosa de Gil Tourist Center: It contains several crystalline ceramic items from the colonial period, a yellow skeleton, cultural vestiges found in Siquisique, shackles used in the time of the dictator Gomez and a variety of objects of great importance to the town.
- Casa Lara (Carora): Here was born the general Juan Jacinto Lara, the hero of the Independence to whom the name of the State is due.
- Museum of Barquisimeto: Building constructed in 1579, where previously the Hospital San Lázaro worked to pass after some reforms in the year of 1877 to be the Hospital La Caridad. Some time later, in 1939, it was renamed Antonio María Pineda Hospital. When this hospital was moved to another location, the building became the main museum of the city in 1983.

=== Main churches ===
- Church of the Conception: First Cathedral built in Barquisimeto Dragged away by the earthquake of 1812, rebuilt 30 years later with a different style San Francisco Church: Built in 1865, it worked as the second cathedral.
- Our Lady of the Conception Church This beautiful building is the only remaining vestige of the old colonial capital. The image of the Immaculate that is in the church was sent to El Tocuyo by Felipe II in 1547, and since then the altarpiece has not left the church.
- Santuario Divina Pastora: Construction of the eighteenth century, has the image of the Divine Shepherdess, patron saint of Santa Rosa and Barquisimeto. In the month of January the image is taken in procession to the Cathedral of Barquisimeto. This procession is the second most important in Latin America.

Apart from the churches, the monument with the mantle of Mary stands out, which was built to honor the Virgin Mary in her dedication to the Divina Pastora.

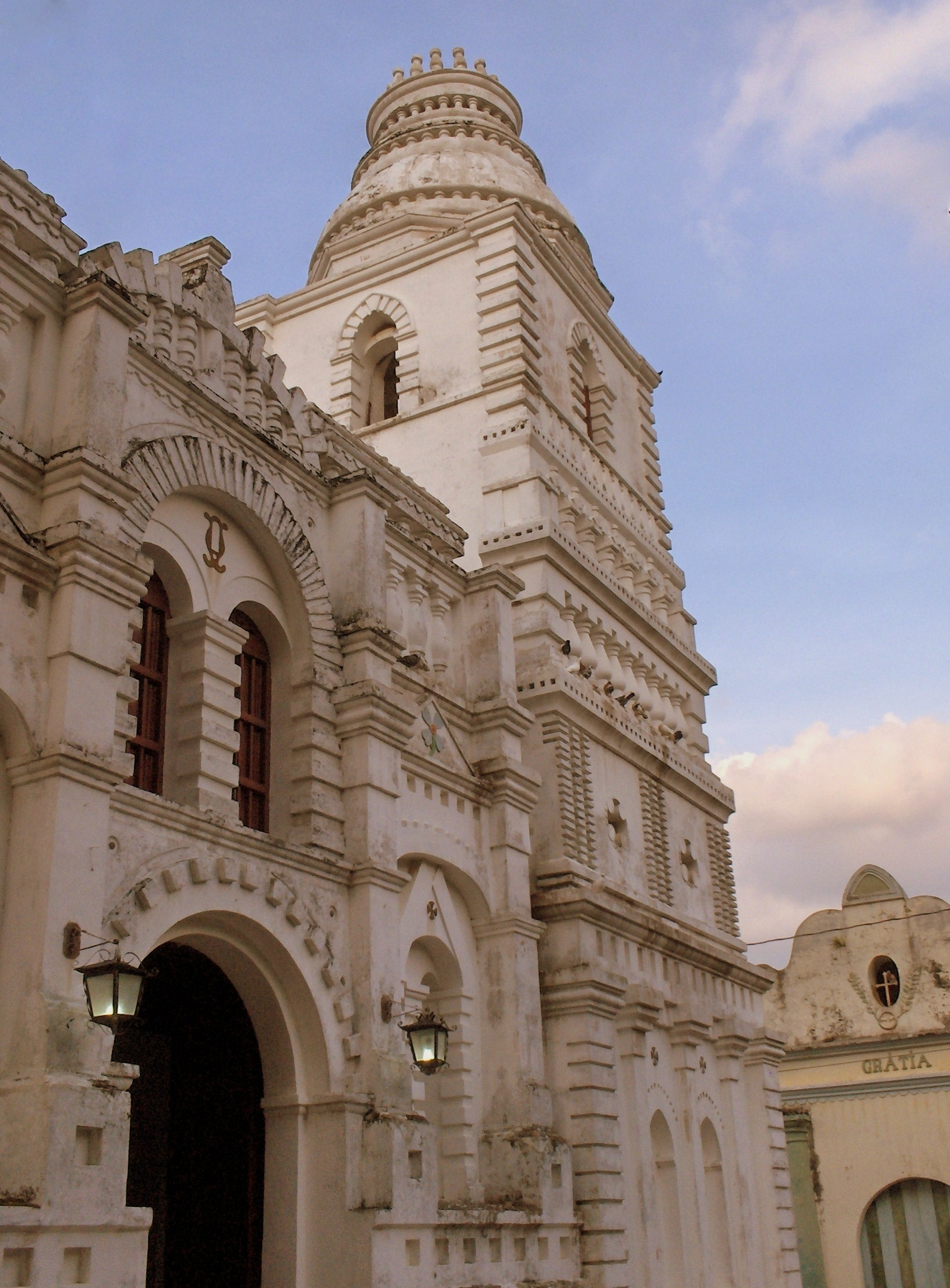
St. Philip the Apostle Church, Barbacoas, Lara State

== Heraldry ==
Created by Decree of the Legislative Assembly, dated February 9, 1877.

The heraldic conformation of this emblem according to the ratification of the President of the State, Dr. Rafael González Pacheco, on May 8, 1905, is the following

"The Shield, divided into four quarters, two in gold and two in blue, in which the breeding is represented by two ox heads; a sickle and a bundle of ears representing agriculture. These quarters will be separated by a red bar, which will contain two cannons, and in the center, a fortress on a silver field. At the top, the Star of the West will shine and the whole shield will be encircled by a laurel wreath with a silver band.

== Culture ==
The Culture of the region is very rich, it is a seat for multitudinous celebrations, such as The International Carnivals of Barquisimeto (Month of February–March), where you can see a great variety of floats, and artistic musical shows of recognized trajectory, The International Fair of Barquisimeto which begins on September 14 (anniversary of the founding of Barquisimeto), and culminates on September 25 each year, where you can see, among many things, various exhibitions and musical shows, and finally, a wide range of options to enjoy Christmas in Barquisimeto, where you can see various exhibitions, musical shows and many fireworks. It is customary to receive the New Year at La Flor de Venezuela, with family and friends. Around Barquisimeto and due to migration also in the city are practiced "Los Tamunangues" or devotional festivities to San Antonio de Padua, as payment of promises to favors received. The festivity has its origins in the Andes Larenses (Sanare-El Tocuyo) and is celebrated every June 13; but a Tamunangue can be held at any time of the year. Master Luis Felipe Ramón y Rivera explains that the name Tamunangue derives from the name given to the drum used in the interpretation of the characteristic songs of this dance, the tamunango.

The Divine Shepherdess is an important religious icon in Venezuela. She is the spiritual patron of the city and is one of the Marian invocations with many followers in the region. Every January 14 a multitudinous procession is held in which this image is carried from Santa Rosa to the Cathedral of Barquisimeto. More than two and a half million people have been counted,29 which would make it the second most important Marian procession in the world.

=== Traditions ===
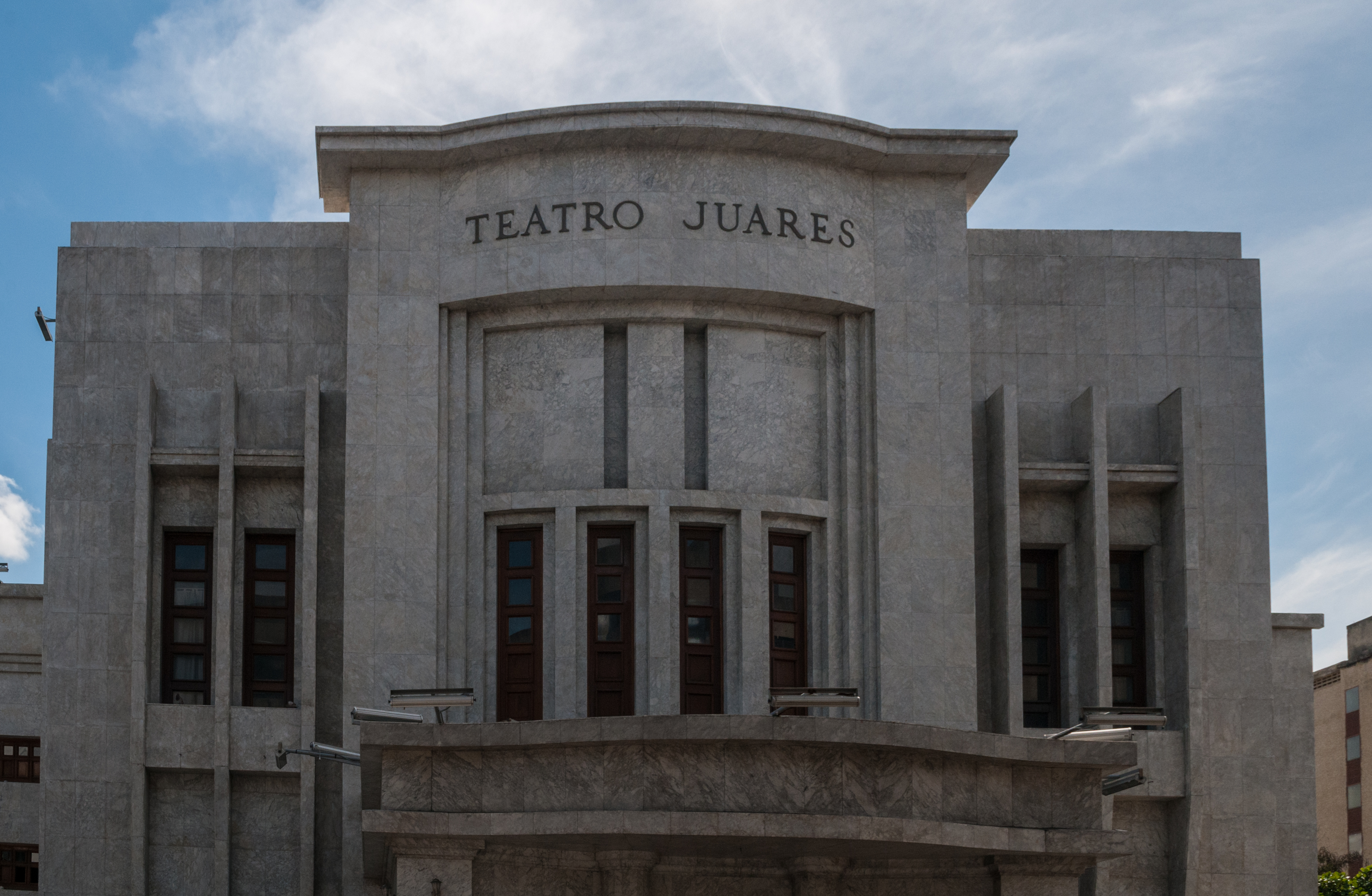
Juares Theater in Barquisimeto

In the state of Lara, different and varied cultural manifestations of folklore are mixed, which clearly enrich the society of the central-western part of the country. These festivals are celebrated throughout the year in the different municipalities that make up our state. Likewise, some of these typical folkloric manifestations that you can know are

- The Tamunangue
- The Blow
- The Game of
- Zaragozas
- St. Benedict's Dance
- Rosary of Souls
- Turas

== Sport ==
Lara State is home to several soccer, baseball, and basketball teams among other sports. In football highlights the Deportivo Lara based in the Metropolitan Stadium one of the most modern sports facilities in this region of the country. The baseball team, Cardenales de Lara, is based in the historic Antonio Herrera Gutierrez Stadium, while in Basketball the most important team is Guaros de Lara based in the Domo Bolivariano.

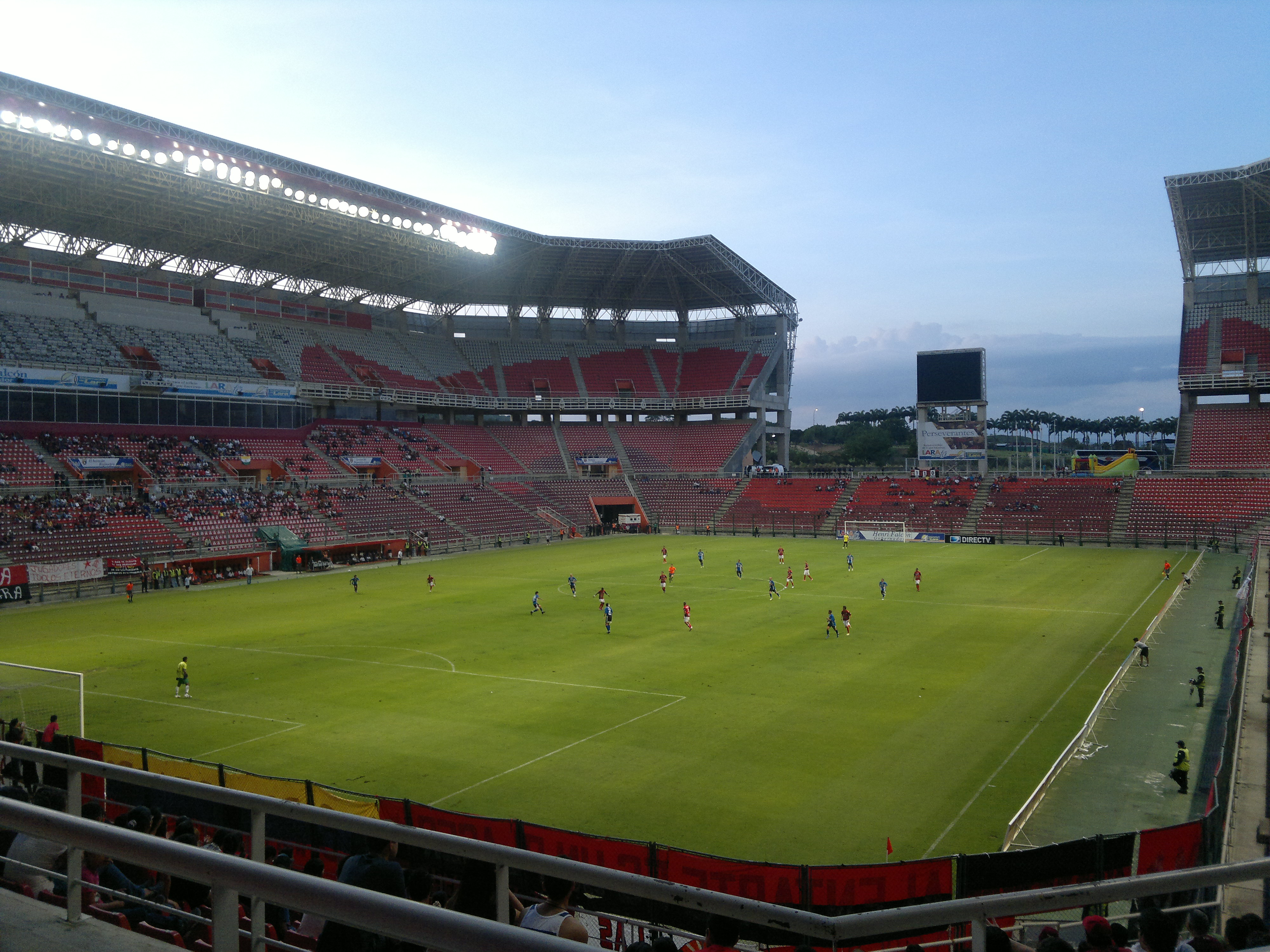
Lara Metropolitan Stadium

=== Sports facilities ===
- Farid Richa Stadium
- Lara Metropolitan Stadium
- Máximo Viloria Sports Centre
- Antonio Herrera Gutierrez Stadium
- Farid Richa Stadium
- Bolivarian Dome of Barquisimeto

== See also ==
- States of Venezuela
