= Simón Planas Municipality =

Simón Planas Municipality Municipio Simón Planas
- Municipality
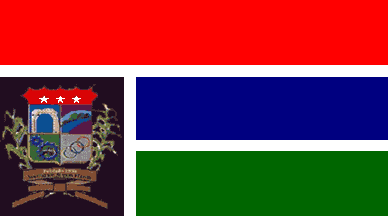
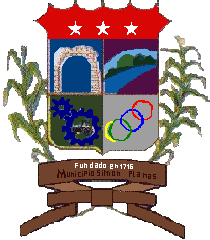
- Flag Coat of arms

- Location in Lara

- Location in Venezuela
- Coordinates: 9°47′44″N 69°06′19″W
- Country: Venezuela
- State: Lara
- Municipal seat: Sarare

Government
  - Mayor: Elis Silva Daza (PSUV)

Area
  - Total: 828.1 km^{2} (319.7 sq mi)

Population (2007)
  - Total: 35,170
  - Density: 42.47/km^{2} (110.0/sq mi)
- Time zone: UTC−4 (VET)
- Area code(s): 0251
- Website: Official website

The Simón Planas Municipality is one of the nine municipalities (municipios) that makes up the Venezuelan state of Lara and, according to a 2007 population estimate by the National Institute of Statistics of Venezuela, the municipality has a population of 35,170. The town of Sarare is the shire town of the Simón Planas Municipality.

== History ==
The municipality was officially founded in 1990.

== Demographics ==
The Simón Planas Municipality, according to a 2011 population census by the National Institute of Statistics of Venezuela, has a population of 35,802 (up from 29,521 in 2000). This amounts to 2% of the state's population. The municipality's population density is 43.53 inhabitants per square kilometre (112.7/sq mi).

== Government ==
The mayor of the Simón Planas Municipality is Naudy Jesús Ledezma Canelón, re-elected on October 31, 2004, with 61% of the vote. The municipality is divided into three parishes; Sarare, Buría, and Gustavo Vegas León.

== See also ==
- Sarare
- Lara
- Municipalities of Venezuela
