= Sanare, Venezuela =

Sanare
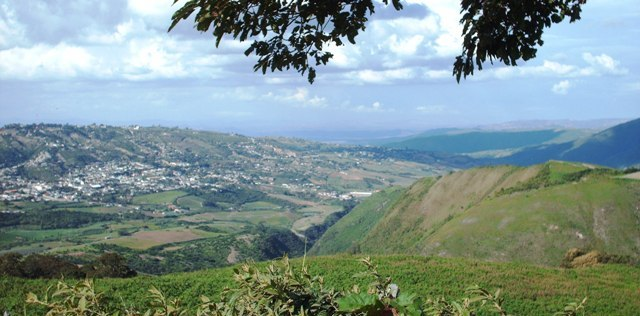

- Coat of arms

- Location within Venezuela
- Coordinates: 9°46′56″N 69°47′35″W
- Country: Venezuela
- State: Lara
- Municipality: Andrés Eloy Blanco
- Founded: 1620
- Elevation: 1,354 m (4,442 ft)

Population
  - Total: 48,764
  - Demonym: Sanareño/a
- Time zone: VST
- Postal code: 3018
- Area code: 0253

Sanare is a major city and the seat of government in the municipality of Andrés Eloy Blanco in Lara State, Venezuela. Andrés Eloy Blanco is further subdivided into three parishes: Pio Tamayo (in which Sanare is the main city), Yacambú, and La Quebrada Honda del Guache. Sanare was founded in 1620 by the friar Dominico Melchor Ponce de Leon following the orders of the governor Don Francisco de la Hoz Berrio [disputed statement].

Sanare experiences a sub-humid climate, with an average rainfall of 1,680 mm annually and an average yearly temperature of 68 °F. Sanare is situated at 1,357 m above the sea level.

Sanare has a population of 39,052 and a population density of 55.90 inhabitants/km^{2}. Approximately 45.9% of the population is less than 15 years old.

The local economy is driven by agriculture. The most significant crop is coffee. Other crops include potatoes, black beans, corn, and strawberries.
