= Sarare =

- Simón Planas Municipality in Lara State

- Location within Venezuela
- Coordinates: 09°47′02″N 69°09′40″W
- Country: Venezuela
- State: Lara
- Municipality: Simón Planas Municipality
- Founded: 1716

Government
  - Mayor: Elis Silva Daza (PSUV)

Population (2010)estimates
  - Total: 12,535
- Time zone: UTC-4:30 (VST)
  - Summer (DST): UTC-4:30 (not observed)
- Postal code: 3015
- Website: (in Spanish)

Sarare is a town in the Venezuelan state of Lara. It is the seat of the Simón Planas Municipality. The town and surroundings have about 12,535 inhabitants. It is located on the shores of the Sarare River, which flows into the Orinoco.

== History ==
Fray Pedro de Alcalá founded the town in 1716 as Indian missionary town. The first inhabitants were 73 families from the Atures tribe. There were also Indians from the Cherrecheres, Guamonteyes, Guamos, Colorados, Achaguas, Guáricos, Gayones and Otomaco and Taparita groups. A year after the foundation most settlers died from an epidemic.

Fray Diego de Urbique founded Sarare in 1754 as the Mission of Saint Nicolas of Sarare.
