= Andrés Eloy Blanco Municipality, Lara =

Andrés Eloy Blanco Municipality Municipio Andrés Eloy Blanco
- Municipality
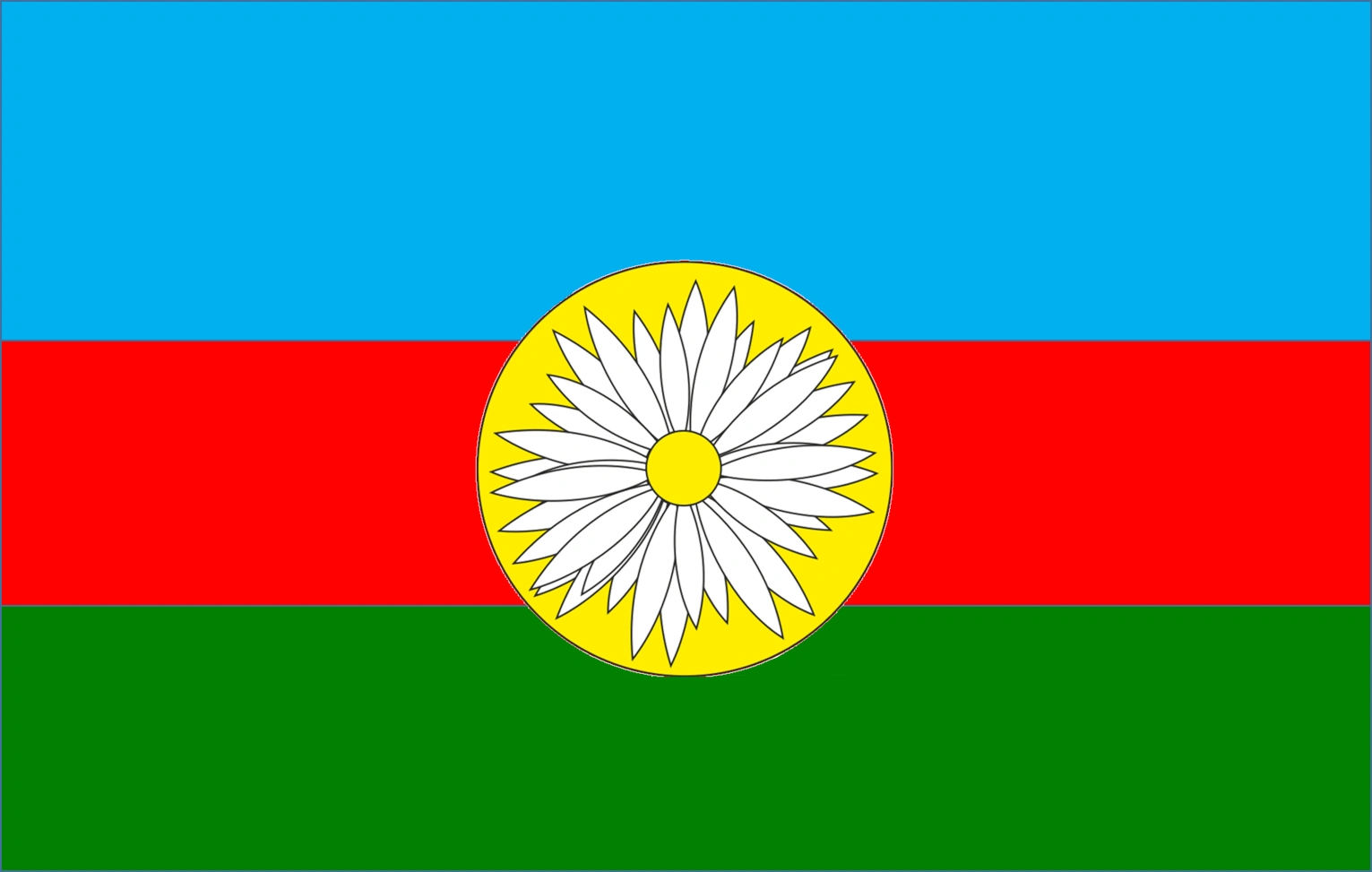
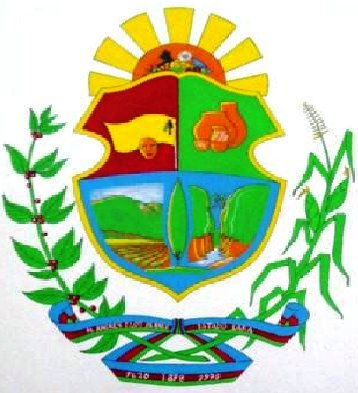
- Flag Coat of arms

- Location in Lara

- Location in Venezuela
- Coordinates: 9°38′41″N 69°33′16″W
- Country: Venezuela
- State: Lara
- Municipal seat: Sanare

Government
  - Mayor: Wilmer Granadillo Zambrano (PSUV)

Area
  - Total: 838.5 km^{2} (323.7 sq mi)

Population (2007)
  - Total: 49,812
  - Density: 59.41/km^{2} (153.9/sq mi)
- Time zone: UTC−4 (VET)
- Area code(s): 0253
- Website: Official website

The Andrés Eloy Blanco Municipality is one of the nine municipalities (municipios) that makes up the Venezuelan state of Lara and, according to a 2007 population estimate by the National Institute of Statistics of Venezuela, the municipality has a population of 49,812. The town of Sanare is the county seat of the Andrés Eloy Blanco Municipality. The municipality is one of several in Venezuela named "Andrés Eloy Blanco Municipality" in honour of Venezuelan poet Andrés Eloy Blanco.

== Demographics ==
The Andrés Eloy Blanco Municipality, according to a 2011 population census by the National Institute of Statistics of Venezuela, has a population of 47,245 (up from 43,194 in 2000). This amounts to 2.8% of the state's population. The municipality's population density is 70.36 inhabitants per square kilometre (182.2/sq mi).

== Government ==
The mayor of the Andrés Eloy Blanco Municipality is Alfredo Antonio Orozco, elected on October 31, 2004, with 64% of the vote. He replaced Daniel Quiñonez shortly after the elections. The municipality is divided into three parishes; Pío Tamayo, Quebrada Honda de Guache, and Yacambú.

== Administrative divisions ==
There are 3 parroquias (Spanish for parishes):

Quebrada Honda de Guache

Pío Tamayo

Yacambú
