= SOECN =

Argentinian ceramist workers' union

The SOECN (Sindicato de Obreros y Empleados Ceramistas de Neuquén) is a ceramist workers' union based in Neuquén province, Argentina. It is known for being one of the first unions in Argentina to employ a method of rank-and-file unionism, representing the workers of the FaSinPat cooperative.

== Style of Unionism ==
SOECN was formed by the workers of the Zanon Ceramics factory in Neuquén in 2000. The SOECN employs a style of class-conscious unionism which seeks a political agenda beyond the workplace. The SOECN's constitution is grounded on three basic principles: worker's democracy, class autonomy, and internationalism and anti-imperialism. It employs a horizontal, minimally bureaucratic, and de-centralized form of organization. The SOECN's constitution affirms that "the working class has no borders", and that it opposes imperialist control over national resources and obstruction of national development.
