= Andrés Blanco (Argentina) =

Argentine politician

Andrés Blanco is an activist in the Socialist Workers' Party (Argentina).

He was elected as a provincial deputy in Neuquén Province in 2019.

He has been involved in the FaSinPat factory occupation, and is assistant secretary of the ceramics workers' union in Neuquén.

== Sources ==
- Two Socialists Elected In Neuquén Province, Argentina
