= FaSinPat =

Worker-controlled ceramic tile factory in Argentina

Coordinates: 38°53′52.02″S 68°5′32.32″W

Logo

FaSinPat (Spanish: Fábrica Sin Patrones, lit. 'Factory Without Bosses'), formerly known as Zanon, is a worker-controlled ceramic tile factory in the southern Argentine province of Neuquén, and one of the most prominent in the recovered factory movement of Argentina.

== Opening of the factory ==
The factory was opened in the early 1980s by Luis Zanon, when Argentina was ruled by a dictatorship. According to Alejandro López, a representative of the workers' union, Zanon's factory was built on public land using public funding from the national and provincial governments, which were never repaid. In the inaugural parade, Luigi Zanon congratulated the military government for "keeping Argentina safe for investments". During the 1990s, Zanon grew because of loans from the national and provincial governments; Luigi Zanon was a good friend of both former president Carlos Menem and former governor of Neuquén, Jorge Sobisch.

According to López, the Zanon labour union came under the control of criminal elements that acted in collusion with the factory owners during the 1990s, when Argentine labour laws offered little protection to workers. In 2000, after they had taken back control of the union leadership, Zanon workers started to demand improved working conditions. The increased labour activism led to serious conflict with the factory owner, who started firing workers until he decided for a lockout in 2001 in the hope of hiring a more docile workforce in the future.

== Closure of Zanon factory and takeover by workers ==
After the closure of the Zanon factory, workers squatted the abandoned factory in a desperate attempt to keep their jobs. They justified this by the large amount of money they were owed in back pay, the fact that the Zanon factory had been built with public funds, as well as worries about asset stripping. These events occurred in the general context of the turmoil created by the 2001 economic crisis. Following the initial occupation, the workers spent months camping outside of the factory without receiving any wages. Facing an attempted lockout by Zanon's management, the workers voted on October 2, 2001, to remain in the factory. On March 2, 2002, 240 workers resumed production for the first time without Zanon management supervision.

In the beginning, the takeover was not explicitly resisted by Luigi Zanon. In 2002, the government abandoned the fixed one-to-one peso–dollar parity and decreed the pesificación ("peso-ification"), the conversion of all bank accounts denominated in dollars into pesos at the official rate. As a result of the changed economic environment, FaSinPat started to be profitable again, and Luigi Zanon attempted to reclaim ownership of the factory. This included legal action and pressure to force the government to evict all of the workers. FaSinPat has also been the target of increasing violence and death threats, such as the kidnapping and torture of a female worker in March 2005.

FaSinPat has been financially successful and able to expand. During four years of operation, over 170 new workers were hired, bringing the total number of workers to 410 by April 2005. Hindering FaSinPat's profitability is that the worker-controlled factory pays full price for electricity and gas while the previous owner only paid 20%. FaSinPat is the only factory in Neuquén to do so. In eight years the Neuquén Province has not bought any tiles from FaSinPat.

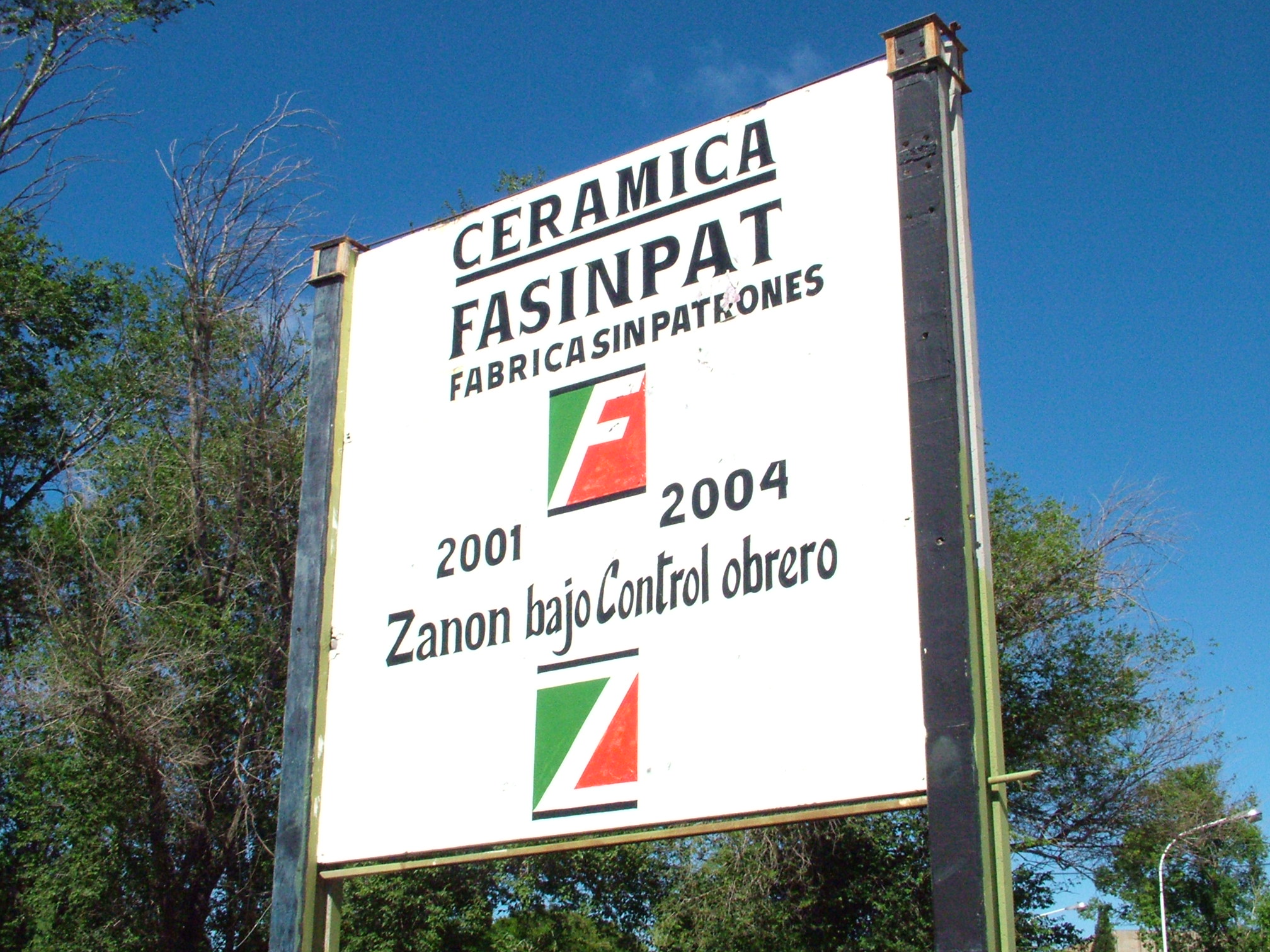
Sign by the entrance

FaSinPat has nurtured its relationship with the surrounding community. From the start, the recovered factory donated tiles to community centers and hospitals and organised cultural activities for the community on its premises. In 2005, FaSinPat voted to build a community health clinic in the impoverished Nueva España neighbourhood. The inhabitants of Nueva España had been demanding such a clinic from the provincial government for two decades; FaSinPat built it in three months. The workers also make monthly donations to soup kitchens and hospitals. Community support has been very important in protecting the recovered factory from the threats it is subjected to.

On August 14, 2009, the provincial legislature voted to expropriate the factory to the Zanon cooperative legally and indefinitely by a count of 26 for and 9 against. The state also agreed to pay the principal creditors, who still owed roughly 22 million pesos (around $7 million). Chief amongst these creditors are the World Bank, from whom Luis Zanon took a substantial loan to start the factory, and Sacmi, an Italian company that produces ceramics machinery. However, the cooperative has resisted these moves, arguing that these creditors participated in a fraudulent bankruptcy in 2001, and that Zanon himself should be liable for these debts, because the credits went to him personally, and not the plant.

== Relationship to unionism ==
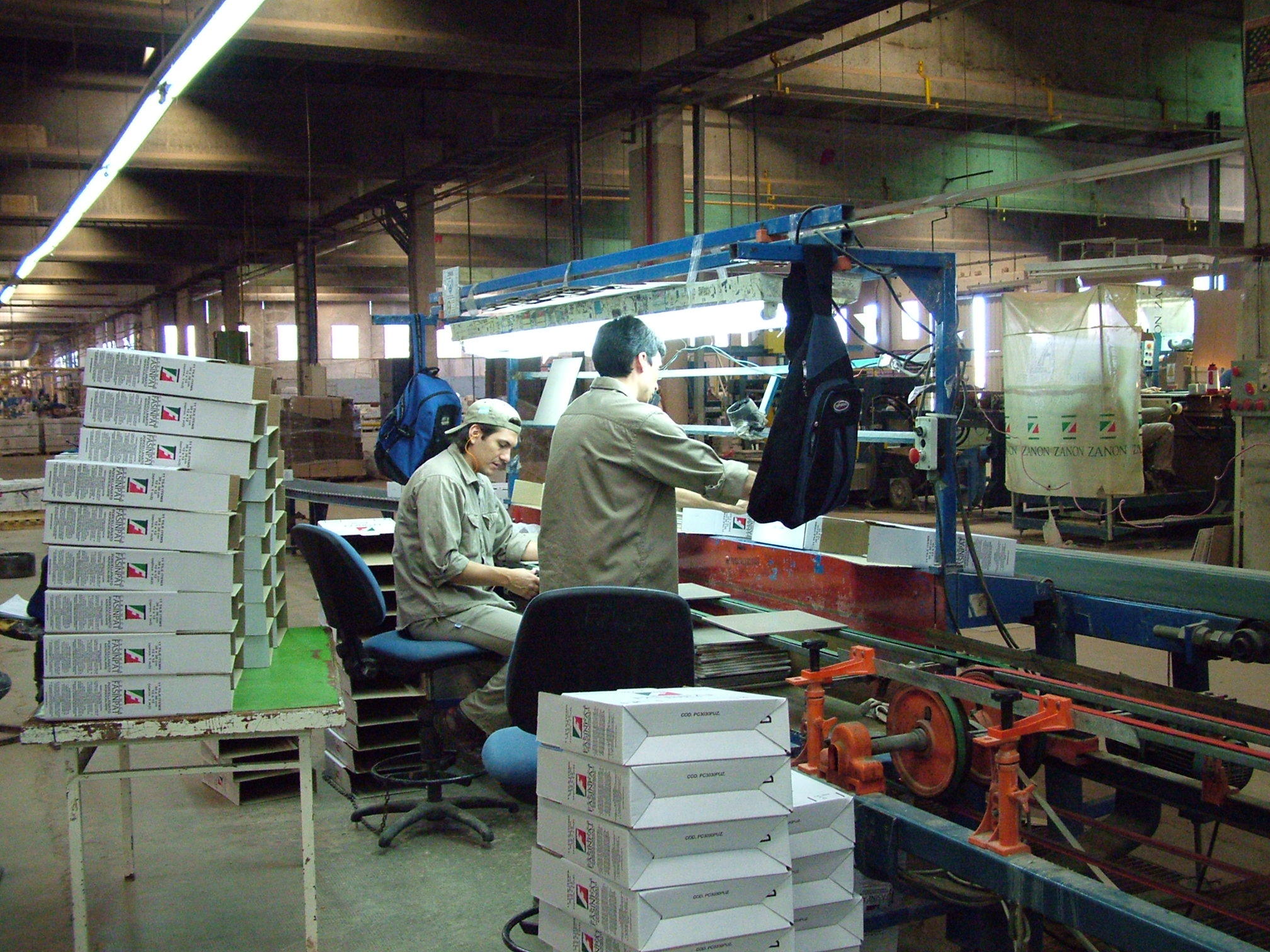
Working at FaSinPat

The FaSinPat workers' contributions to the development of rank and file unionism (sindicalismo de base) played a major role in their capability to organize among themselves and maintain control of the factory. This style of unionism, which incorporates worker assemblies, taking control of internal assemblies, and constituting alternative union locals presented a challenge to the dominant organizational structure of powerful unions such as the CGT (General Confederation of Labor), which have a more bureaucratic organization and a tendency to compromise to management demands. In 2000, the Zanon workers took over Local 21 of the Sindicato de Obreros y Empleados Ceramistas de Neuquén (SOECN), an affiliate of the national ceramists' union. The SOCEN's constitution is grounded on three basic principles: worker's democracy, class autonomy, and internationalism and anti-imperialism. The style of class-conscious unionism employed by the Zanon workers under SOECN represents a break to the traditional form of Peronist unionism in Argentina. Through the SOECN, the workers have supported the Unemployed Worker's Movement of Neuquén (Movimiento de Trabajadores Desocupados) and have supported the Unemployed Workers' Union (Union de Trabajadores Desocupados).

== See also ==
- Workers' self-management
- List of worker cooperatives
