= Andrés Eloy Blanco Municipality =

Andrés Eloy Blanco Municipality may refer to the following places in the Venezuela:

- Andrés Eloy Blanco Municipality, Barinas
- Andrés Eloy Blanco Municipality, Lara
- Andrés Eloy Blanco Municipality, Sucre
