= Andrés Eloy Blanco =

Venezuelan poet and politician

Minister of Foreign Affairs of Venezuela
- In office 15 February 1948 – 24 November 1948
- President: Rómulo Gallegos
- Preceded by: Gonzalo Barrios
- Succeeded by: Luis Emilio Gómez Ruiz

Personal details
- Born: 6 August 1896 Cumaná, Sucre state
- Died: 21 May 1955 (aged 57) Mexico City, Mexico
- Party: Democratic Action
- Spouse: Lilina Iturbe
- Profession: writer, poet, politician

Andrés Eloy Blanco Meaño (6 August 1896 – 21 May 1955) was a noted Venezuelan poet and politician. He was a member of the Generación del 28, and one of the founders of Acción Democrática (AD). He was Minister of Foreign Affairs of Venezuela from 15 February 1948 until 24 November 1948.

== Biography ==
He was born in Cumaná, Sucre state, Venezuela, on 6 August 1896. Blanco's family settled on Margarita Island, (Nueva Esparta State) where he lived part of his childhood, until he moved to Caracas to attend classes at Universidad Central de Venezuela.

He earned his first award in 1918 by writing the pastoral poem Canto a la Espiga y al Arado, and released his first drama play, El Huerto de la Epopeya. That year he was put in jail by protesting against the government. In 1923 got his first prize at the Juegos Florales (Floral Games) in Santander, Cantabria, Spain with the poem Canto a España (A Song to Spain). He traveled to Spain to receive the reward and stayed there for more than a year.

He was Minister of Foreign Affairs of Venezuela from 15 February 1948 until 24 November 1948.. In 1948 Blanco was exiled to Mexico City and Pedro Infante sings the song "Angelitos Negros" in the homonymous film inspired by his poem Píntame Angelitos Negros set to music by the Mexican composer Manuel Álvarez Maciste. It's a protest against racism.

He died in Mexico City, Mexico, on 21 May 1955. Several Venezuelan municipalities are named in his honor.

== Bibliography ==
- Tierras que me oyeron (1921)
- Poda (1934)
- La Aeroplana Clueca (1935)
- Baedeker 2000 (1935)
- Barco de Piedra (1937)
- Abigaíl (1937)
- Malvina recobrada (1938)
- Liberación y Siembra (1938)
- Angelitos Negros (Black Little Angels) (1943)
- El Poeta y el pueblo (1954)
- Giraluna (1955)
- La Juanbimbada (1959)

== See also ==
- List of ministers of foreign affairs of Venezuela
- Political prisoners in Venezuela

Political offices
Preceded by Gonzalo Barrios	154th Minister of Foreign Affairs of Venezuela; 15 February 1948 – 24 November 1948	Succeeded by Jacinto Fombona Pachano
